= Fyter Fest (2022) =

All Elite Wrestling four-part television special

- Promotional poster for the Week 2 Dynamite broadcast featuring various AEW wrestlers
- Promotion: All Elite Wrestling
- Date: Week 1: July 13, 2022 (aired July 13 and 15, 2022); Week 2: July 20, 2022 (aired July 20 and 22, 2022)
- City: Savannah, Georgia (July 13); Duluth, Georgia (July 20)
- Venue: Enmarket Arena (July 13); Gas South Arena (July 20)
- Attendance: Week 1: 3,900; Week 2: 5,096

Fyter Fest chronology
| ← Previous; 2021 | Next → 2023 |

AEW Dynamite special episodes chronology
| ← Previous; Blood & Guts | Next → Fight for the Fallen |

AEW Rampage special episodes chronology
| ← Previous; Royal Rampage | Next → Fight for the Fallen |

The 2022 Fyter Fest was a four-part professional wrestling television special produced by All Elite Wrestling (AEW). It was the fourth annual Fyter Fest and encompassed the two-week broadcasts of AEW's weekly programs, Wednesday Night Dynamite on TBS and Friday Night Rampage on TNT, beginning July 13 and concluding on July 22. The 2022 event expanded upon the previous two years, which were held as a two-part special of Dynamite.

Week 1's episodes were held on July 13, 2022, at the Enmarket Arena in Savannah, Georgia, while Week 2's episodes were held on July 20, 2022, at the Gas South Arena in Duluth, Georgia. For both weeks, Dynamite aired live, while Rampage aired on tape delay, with the first week's Rampage airing on July 15 and the second week's on July 22.

== Production ==
=== Background ===
Fyter Fest is a professional wrestling event held annually during the summer by All Elite Wrestling (AEW) since 2019. The fourth Fyter Fest was scheduled to be held as a four-part television special. While the previous two years were only held as a two-part special of Wednesday Night Dynamite, the 2022 event was expanded to also include each week's broadcasts of Friday Night Rampage. Dynamite aired on TBS with Rampage on TNT. The first week was held on July 13, 2022, at the Enmarket Arena in Savannah, Georgia, while the second week was held on July 20, 2022, at the Gas South Arena in Duluth, Georgia. For both weeks, Dynamite aired live while Rampage aired on tape delay, with the first week's Rampage airing on July 15 and the second week's on July 22.

=== Storylines ===
Fyter Fest featured professional wrestling matches that involved different wrestlers from pre-existing scripted feuds and storylines. Storylines were produced on AEW's weekly television programs, Dynamite and Rampage, the supplementary online streaming shows, Dark and Elevation, and The Young Bucks' YouTube series Being The Elite.

== Results ==
=== Week 1 ===
Dynamite (aired live July 13)
| No. | Results | Stipulations | Times |
|---|---|---|---|
| 1 | Wardlow (c) defeated Orange Cassidy (with Best Friends (Chuck Taylor and Trent Beretta)) by pinfall | Singles match for the AEW TNT Championship | 11:35 |
| 2 | Jon Moxley (with William Regal) defeated Konosuke Takeshita by submission | AEW Interim World Championship Eliminator Match; Had Takeshita won, he would have received a future title shot at Moxley's interim AEW World Championship. | 13:10 |
| 3 | Luchasaurus (with Christian Cage) defeated Griff Garrison (with Brian Pillman Jr.) by submission | Singles match | 1:30 |
| 4 | Claudio Castagnoli (with William Regal) defeated Jake Hager by pinfall | Singles match | 11:35 |
| 5 | Serena Deeb defeated Anna Jay by submission | Singles match | 7:00 |
| 6 | Swerve In Our Glory (Keith Lee and Swerve Strickland) defeated The Young Bucks (Matt Jackson and Nick Jackson) (c) (with Brandon Cutler) and Team Taz (Powerhouse Hobbs and Ricky Starks) by pinfall | Three-way tag team match for the AEW World Tag Team Championship | 18:10 |
(c) / – the champion(s) heading into the match

Rampage (taped July 13, aired July 15)
| No. | Results | Stipulations | Times |
|---|---|---|---|
| 1 | The Kings of the Black Throne (Malakai Black and Brody King) (with Julia Hart) defeated The Dark Order (Alex Reynolds and John Silver) by pinfall | Tag team match | 8:18 |
| 2 | Jonathan Gresham (c) (with Tully Blanchard Enterprises (Tully Blanchard, Brian Cage, and Gates of Agony (Kaun and Toa Liona)) defeated Lee Moriarty (with Matt Sydal) by submission | Singles match for the ROH World Championship | 10:08 |
| 3 | Kris Statlander and Athena defeated The Renegade Twins (Charlette and Robyn Renegade) by pinfall | Tag team match | 0:26 |
| 4 | The Lucha Brothers (Penta Oscuro and Rey Fénix) (with Alex Abrahantes) defeated Private Party (Isiah Kassidy and Marq Quen) (with Andrade El Ídolo and Jose the Assistant) by pinfall | Tag team match | 11:17 |
(c) / – the champion(s) heading into the match

=== Week 2 ===
Dynamite (aired live July 20)
| No. | Results | Stipulations | Times |
|---|---|---|---|
| 1 | Brody King defeated Darby Allin by pinfall | Singles match | 12:35 |
| 2 | Blackpool Combat Club (Jon Moxley and Wheeler Yuta) (with William Regal) defeated Best Friends (Chuck Taylor and Trent Beretta) (with Orange Cassidy) by pinfall | Tag team match | 11:50 |
| 3 | Christian Cage and Luchasaurus defeated The Varsity Blonds (Brian Pillman Jr. and Griff Garrison) by pinfall | Tag team match | 2:00 |
| 4 | Ricky Starks (c) defeated Cole Karter by pinfall | Singles match for the FTW Championship | 6:05 |
| 5 | Jade Cargill and Kiera Hogan (with Stokely Hathaway and Jermaine Dupri) defeated Athena and Willow Nightingale by pinfall | Tag team match | 9:25 |
| 6 | "The Painmaker" Chris Jericho defeated Eddie Kingston by pinfall | Barbed Wire Everywhere Deathmatch; The rest of the Jericho Appreciation Society was suspended above the ring in a shark cage. | 13:10 |
(c) / – the champion(s) heading into the match

Rampage (taped July 20, aired July 22)
| No. | Results | Stipulations | Times |
|---|---|---|---|
| 1 | "Hangman" Adam Page and John Silver defeated The Butcher and The Blade by pinfall | Tag team match | 9:55 |
| 2 | Lee Moriarty (with Matt Sydal) defeated Dante Martin by pinfall | Singles match | 9:00 |
| 3 | Dr. Britt Baker, D.M.D. and Jamie Hayter (with Rebel) defeated Skye Blue and Ashley D'Amboise by pinfall | Tag team match | 5:00 |
| 4 | Jay Lethal (with Sonjay Dutt and Satnam Singh) defeated Christopher Daniels by pinfall | Singles match | 11:00 |

== See also ==
- 2022 in professional wrestling
