= AEW Fyter Fest =

All Elite Wrestling special event series

- AEW Fyter Fest logo
- Promotions: All Elite Wrestling
- Nicknames: "The Most Luxurious Gaming & Wrestling Festival of All Time!"
- First event: 2019

AEW Fyter Fest is a professional wrestling event produced by All Elite Wrestling (AEW). The event was established by the promotion in 2019 and is held during the summer between June and August. Since 2020, Fyter Fest has been held as a multi-part television special of AEW's weekly television programs. The name, slogan, and logo of the event are a parody of the fraudulent Fyre Festival.

The inaugural 2019 event was livestreamed for free as a special event on B/R Live in the United States and on pay-per-view (PPV) internationally, while the 2020 and 2021 events were held as a two-part special of AEW's weekly television program, Wednesday Night Dynamite. In 2022, the event was expanded to being broadcast as a four-part special, encompassing the two-week broadcasts of Dynamite and Friday Night Rampage. It was then reduced to a three-part event in 2023, spanning AEW's three weekly shows of the week, including Saturday Night Collision. An event was not held in 2024, which also saw the cancellation of Rampage at the end of that year. Fyter Fest returned in 2025 as a four-hour marathon of back-to-back special episodes of Dynamite and Collision, the latter preempted from its usual Saturday night timeslot and channel to accommodate for the 2025 Stanley Cup playoffs.

The inaugural event was held in co-sponsorship with Community Effort Orlando (CEO) at the Ocean Center in Daytona Beach, Florida. The second event was planned to air on PPV from the United Kingdom, but due to the COVID-19 pandemic, it took place at Daily's Place in Jacksonville, Florida, which began the event's broadcast as special episodes of the company's weekly television programs.

== History ==
The inaugural Fyter Fest event took place on June 29, 2019, at the Ocean Center in Daytona Beach, Florida in co-sponsorship between All Elite Wrestling (AEW) and Community Effort Orlando (CEO). It was AEW's second-ever event and was held as part of CEO's fighting game event that year. This inaugural event aired for free on B/R Live in North America and on pay-per-view (PPV) internationally. The name, slogan, and logo were a parody of the fraudulent Fyre Festival. It was also the second wrestling event to be co-sponsored by CEO, after the previous year's New Japan Pro-Wrestling (NJPW) event, CEOxNJPW: When Worlds Collide. Both the NJPW and AEW events with CEO came as a result of Kenny Omega, a former prominent wrestler of NJPW who became a wrestler and Executive Vice President of AEW following the founding of the latter in January 2019.

A second event was held in 2020, though was produced by AEW alone. AEW had originally planned to host this second event at Wembley Arena in London, England, United Kingdom in June that year; it would have been the promotion's United Kingdom debut. However, the event was moved to Daily's Place in Jacksonville, Florida due to the COVID-19 pandemic, which began in March that year. This second event was also originally to air on PPV but was changed to being a two-part special of AEW's weekly television program, Wednesday Night Dynamite; the first part aired live on July 1 while the second part was pre-recorded on July 2 and aired on tape delay on July 8.

The 2021 event was announced to also be held as a two-part special of Dynamite. With AEW's return to live touring during the pandemic, the two nights took place in two different Texas markets as the second event of AEW's "Welcome Back" tour. The first night was held on July 14, 2021, at the H-E-B Center at Cedar Park in Cedar Park, Texas (Austin market) with the second night airing on July 21, 2021, from the Curtis Culwell Center in Garland, Texas (Dallas–Fort Worth market).

The 2022 event was expanded to be held as a four-part television special, encompassing the two-week broadcasts of Dynamite and Friday Night Rampage—AEW's secondary television program that began airing in August 2021. The July 13 episode of Dynamite was notable for a match between Jake Hager of the Jericho Appreciation Society and Claudio Castagnoli of the Blackpool Combat Club; both men previously wrestled for WWE as Jack Swagger and Cesaro, respectively, as a tag team named The Real Americans.

On August 11, 2023, AEW president Tony Khan announced that the fifth Fyter Fest would be held during the go-home week for that year's All In, moving the event to August. The 2023 event was reduced to a three-part event and encompassed the August 23 episode of Dynamite, the August 25 episode of Rampage, and the August 26 episode of Collision, the latter a third program that launched in June and airs on Saturdays.

An event was not held in 2024, which also saw the cancellation of Rampage at the end of that year, but during the April 5, 2025, episode of Collision, it was announced that Fyter Fest would return on June 4, 2025, emanating from the Mission Ballroom in Denver, Colorado. The sixth Fyter Fest was scheduled to air live as a four-hour marathon of back-to-back special episodes of Dynamite and Collision, both simulcast on TBS and Max, with Collision preempted from its usual Saturday night timeslot and channel to accommodate for TNT's coverage of the 2025 Stanley Cup playoffs.

== Events ==
#	Event	Date	City	Venue	Main event	Ref.
1	Fyter Fest (2019)	June 29, 2019	Daytona Beach, Florida	Ocean Center	Jon Moxley vs. Joey Janela in a non-sanctioned match	
2	Fyter Fest (2020)	Night 1: Dynamite; July 1, 2020	Jacksonville, Florida (Note: Originally scheduled to take place at Wembley Arena in London, England, United Kingdom, but the event was moved due to the COVID-19 pandemic. It was also originally to air on pay-per-view, but was changed to a two-part Dynamite special episode.)	Daily's Place	Kenny Omega and "Hangman" Adam Page (c) vs. Best Friends (Trent and Chuck Taylor) for the AEW World Tag Team Championship	
2	Fyter Fest (2020)	Night 2: Dynamite; July 2, 2020 (aired July 8)	Jacksonville, Florida	Daily's Place	Chris Jericho vs. Orange Cassidy (Note: Originally scheduled to be Jon Moxley (c) vs. Brian Cage for the AEW World Championship, the match was rescheduled to Fight for the Fallen due to possible exposure to COVID-19 from Moxley's wife, Renee Young.)	
3	Fyter Fest (2021)	Night 1: Dynamite; July 14, 2021	Cedar Park, Texas	H-E-B Center at Cedar Park	Darby Allin vs. Ethan Page in a Coffin match	
3	Fyter Fest (2021)	Night 2: Dynamite; July 21, 2021	Garland, Texas	Curtis Culwell Center	Jon Moxley (c) vs. Lance Archer in a Texas Death match for the IWGP United States Heavyweight Championship	
4	Fyter Fest (2022)	Night 1: Dynamite; July 13, 2022	Savannah, Georgia	Enmarket Arena	The Young Bucks (Matt Jackson and Nick Jackson) (c) vs. Team Taz (Ricky Starks and Powerhouse Hobbs) vs. Swerve in Our Glory (Keith Lee and Swerve Strickland) in a Three-way tag team match for the AEW World Tag Team Championship	
4	Fyter Fest (2022)	Night 2: Rampage; July 13, 2022 (aired July 15)	Savannah, Georgia	Enmarket Arena	The Lucha Brothers (Penta Oscuro and Rey Fénix) vs. Private Party (Isiah Kassidy and Marq Quen)	
4	Fyter Fest (2022)	Night 3: Dynamite; July 20, 2022	Duluth, Georgia	Gas South Arena	Eddie Kingston vs. Chris Jericho in a Discovery Channel Shark Week Barbed Wire Everywhere Deathmatch; The rest of the Jericho Appreciation Society were suspended outside the ring in a shark cage.	
4	Fyter Fest (2022)	Night 4: Rampage; July 20, 2022 (aired July 22)	Duluth, Georgia	Gas South Arena	Jay Lethal vs. Christopher Daniels	
5	Fyter Fest (2023)	Night 1: Dynamite; August 23, 2023	Duluth, Georgia	Gas South Arena	Aussie Open (Kyle Fletcher and Mark Davis) (c) vs. The Hardys (Jeff Hardy and Matt Hardy) for the ROH World Tag Team Championship	
5	Fyter Fest (2023)	Night 2: Rampage; August 19, 2023 (aired August 25)	Lexington, Kentucky	Rupp Arena	The Outcasts (Saraya and Toni Storm) vs. Hikaru Shida and Dr. Britt Baker, D.M.D.	
5	Fyter Fest (2023)	Night 3: Collision; August 23, 2023 (aired August 26)	Duluth, Georgia	Gas South Arena	Darby Allin, Sting, Hook, and CM Punk vs. Mogul Embassy (Brian Cage and Swerve Strickland), Jay White, and Luchasaurus	
6	Fyter Fest (2025) (Note: Dynamite and Collision aired back-to-back in a four-hour block, simulcast on TBS and Max. Collision was preempted from its usual Saturday night timeslot and channel to accommodate for TNT's coverage of the 2025 Stanley Cup Playoffs.)	Dynamite; June 4, 2025	Denver, Colorado	Mission Ballroom	Kenny Omega (c) vs. Brody King vs. Claudio Castagnoli vs. Máscara Dorada in a Four-way match for the AEW International Championship	
6	Fyter Fest (2025)	Collision; June 4, 2025	Denver, Colorado	Mission Ballroom	The Paragon (Adam Cole, Kyle O'Reilly, and Roderick Strong) and Daniel Garcia vs. The Don Callis Family (Josh Alexander, Lance Archer, Trent Beretta, and Rocky Romero)	
(c) – refers to the champion(s) heading into the match

== See also ==
- List of AEW pay-per-view events
- List of All Elite Wrestling special events
- List of AEW Dynamite special episodes
- List of AEW Collision special episodes
- List of AEW Rampage special episodes
