= Fyter Fest (2023) =

All Elite Wrestling three-part television special

- Promotional poster for the Dynamite and Collision shows
- Promotion: All Elite Wrestling
- Date: August 19 and 23, 2023 (aired August 23, 25, and 26, 2023)
- City: Lexington, Kentucky (Aug. 19); Duluth, Georgia (Aug. 23)
- Venue: Rupp Arena (Lexington); Gas South Arena (Duluth)
- Attendance: Night 1: 5,343; Night 2: 3,228; Night 3: 5,343

Fyter Fest chronology
← Previous; 2022	Next → 2025

AEW Dynamite special episodes chronology
← Previous; Fight for the Fallen	Next → Grand Slam

AEW Rampage special episodes chronology
← Previous; Fight for the Fallen	Next → Grand Slam

AEW Collision special episodes chronology
← Previous; Fight for the Fallen	Next → Winter Is Coming

The 2023 Fyter Fest was a three-part professional wrestling television special produced by All Elite Wrestling (AEW). It was the fifth annual Fyter Fest and was held on August 19 and 23, 2023, at the Rupp Arena in Lexington, Kentucky and the Gas South Arena in Duluth, Georgia, respectively, encompassing the broadcasts of AEW's weekly television programs, Wednesday Night Dynamite, Friday Night Rampage, and Saturday Night Collision, which aired on August 23, 25, and 26, 2023, respectively. Rampage was held on August 19 and aired on tape delay on August 25 on TNT, while Dynamite and Collision were held on August 23 with Dynamite airing live on TBS while Collision aired on tape delay on August 26 on TNT. A Fyter Fest was not held in 2024 but returned in 2025.

A total of 15 matches were held across the three shows. Five matches were held live on Dynamite, with three matches taped for Rampage in addition to one dark match, and six matches taped for Collision. In the main event of the Dynamite broadcast, Aussie Open (Mark Davis and Kyle Fletcher) defeated The Hardys (Jeff Hardy and Matt Hardy) to retain the ROH World Tag Team Championship, in the main event of the Rampage broadcast, The Outcasts (Saraya and Toni Storm) defeated Hikaru Shida and Dr. Britt Baker, D.M.D., while in the main event of the Collision broadcast, Darby Allin, Sting, Hook, and CM Punk defeated Mogul Embassy (Brian Cage and Swerve Strickland), Jay White, and Luchasaurus in an All In All Star eight-man tag team match.

== Production ==
Other on-screen personnel
Role	Name
Commentators	Excalibur (both shows)
Commentators	Tony Schiavone (both shows)
Commentators	Taz (Dynamite)
Commentators	Johnny TV (Rampage, AAA Latin American Championship)
Commentators	Kevin Kelly (Collision)
Commentators	Caprice Coleman (Collision)
Commentators	Jim Ross (Collision, main event only)
Ring announcers	Justin Roberts (Dynamite)
Ring announcers	Dasha Gonzalez (both shows)
Referees	Bryce Remsburg
Referees	Paul Turner
Referees	Aubrey Edwards
Referees	Rick Knox
Referees	Stephon Smith
Interviewers	Renee Paquette
Interviewers	Lexy Nair

=== Background ===
Fyter Fest is a professional wrestling event held annually during the summer by All Elite Wrestling (AEW) since 2019. After a rescheduling of the 2023 Fight for the Fallen, another annual television special that previously took place the week after Fyter Fest, AEW president Tony Khan announced that the fifth Fyter Fest would be held the week after that year's Fight for the Fallen during the go-home week for the All In pay-per-view, subsequently also moving Fyter Fest to August, which was previously held in July.

While the previous year's event was held as a four-part special, the 2023 event was reduced to a three-part special due to the rescheduling of the 2023 Fight for the Fallen. The 2023 Fyter Fest in turn encompassed the August 23 episode of Wednesday Night Dynamite on TBS, the August 25 episode of Friday Night Rampage on TNT, and the August 26 episode of Saturday Night Collision also on TNT—Collision launched as a third program for AEW in June. Rampage was taped on August 19 at the Rupp Arena in Lexington, Kentucky and aired on tape delay on August 25, while Dynamite and Collision were both held on August 23 at the Gas South Arena in Duluth, Georgia with Dynamite airing live that night and Collision airing on tape delay on August 26.

=== Storylines ===
Fyter Fest featured professional wrestling matches that involved different wrestlers from pre-existing scripted feuds and storylines. Storylines were produced on AEW's weekly television programs, Dynamite, Rampage, and Collision.

== Results ==
=== Night 1 ===
Dynamite (aired live August 23)
No.	Results	Stipulations	Times
1	Jon Moxley defeated Rey Fénix (with Alex Abrahantes) by technical submission	Singles match	13:40
2	Darby Allin and Nick Wayne defeated Mogul Embassy (AR Fox and Swerve Strickland) (with Prince Nana) by pinfall	Tornado tag team match	10:00
3	Ruby Soho defeated Skye Blue by pinfall	Singles match	7:00
4	Aussie Open (Mark Davis and Kyle Fletcher) (c) defeated The Hardys (Jeff Hardy and Matt Hardy) by pinfall	Tag team match for the ROH World Tag Team Championship	8:05
(c) / – the champion(s) heading into the match

=== Night 2 ===
Rampage (taped August 19, aired August 25)
No.	Results	Stipulations	Times
1^{D}	Serpentico defeated Truth Magnum (with Turbo Floyd) by pinfall	Singles match	—
2	Orange Cassidy (c) defeated Aaron Solo (with Harley Cameron) by pinfall	Singles match for the AEW International Championship	9:15
3	QT Marshall (c) (with Johnny TV) defeated Gravity by pinfall	Singles match for the AAA Latin American Championship	8:49
4	Luchasaurus defeated Ren Jones by pinfall	Singles match	1:09
5	The Outcasts (Toni Storm and Saraya) (with Ruby Soho) defeated Dr. Britt Baker, D.M.D. and Hikaru Shida by pinfall	Tag team match	11:55
(c) / – the champion(s) heading into the match; D / – this was a dark match

=== Night 3 ===
Collision (taped August 23, aired August 26)
No.	Results	Stipulations	Times
1	Orange Cassidy, Penta El Zero Miedo, and Eddie Kingston (with Alex Abrahantes) defeated Kip Sabian, The Blade, and The Butcher (with Penelope Ford) by pinfall	Six-man tag team match	9:38
2	The Dark Order (Alex Reynolds and John Silver) defeated Action Andretti and Darius Martin by pinfall	Tag team match	8:36
3	Big Bill (with Ricky Starks) defeated Vary Morales by pinfall	Singles match	1:39
4	Willow Nightingale defeated Robyn Renegade (with Charlette Renegade) by pinfall	Singles match	8:35
5	Keith Lee defeated Zicky Dice by pinfall	Singles match	1:35
6	Darby Allin, Sting, Hook, and CM Punk defeated Mogul Embassy (Brian Cage and Swerve Strickland), Jay White, and Luchasaurus (with Christian Cage and Prince Nana) by submission	All In All Star eight-man tag team match	21:07

== See also ==
- 2023 in professional wrestling
