= All In (2023) =

All Elite Wrestling pay-per-view event

All In: London
- Promotional poster featuring Better Than You Bay Bay (MJF and Adam Cole)
- Promotion: All Elite Wrestling
- Date: August 27, 2023
- City: London, England
- Venue: Wembley Stadium
- Attendance: 72,265 (Note: Turnstile attendance, which reflects the amount of tickets used for admission, was recorded at 72,265 by Brent Council. Tickets distributed, which reflects complimentary and sold tickets, was announced at 81,035.)
- Buy rate: 200,000
- Tagline: The Biggest Event in Wrestling History

Pay-per-view chronology
← Previous; Forbidden Door	Next → All Out

All In chronology
← Previous; 2018	Next → 2024

AEW in the United Kingdom chronology
← Previous; First	Next → All In

The 2023 All In, also promoted as All In: London at Wembley Stadium or simply All In: London, was a professional wrestling pay-per-view (PPV) event produced by the American promotion All Elite Wrestling (AEW). It was the first edition of All In produced by AEW and second overall after the independently-held inaugural All In event in September 2018. The event took place on August 27, 2023, at Wembley Stadium in London, England, coinciding with the United Kingdom's August Bank Holiday weekend.

The event marked AEW's debut in the United Kingdom, their first PPV event held outside of North America, and their first event held in an association football stadium. All In was the first professional wrestling event held at the current Wembley Stadium and first held at the venue in over 30 years, after WWE's SummerSlam in 1992, which was held at the original stadium. First day ticket sales alone broke AEW's live attendance record and ticket revenue. Although the promotion stated a total attendance of 81,035, the total turnstile count reported by local government data logged an actual attendance of 72,265.

Eleven matches were contested at the event, including two on the Zero Hour pre-show. In the main event, MJF defeated Adam Cole to retain the AEW World Championship. In other prominent matches, Will Ospreay defeated Chris Jericho, Eddie Kingston, Penta El Zero Miedo, Best Friends (Chuck Taylor and Trent Beretta), and Orange Cassidy defeated Blackpool Combat Club (Jon Moxley, Claudio Castagnoli, and Wheeler Yuta), Mike Santana, and Ortiz in a Stadium Stampede match, and CM Punk defeated Samoa Joe to retain the "Real World Championship". This would be Punk's final match in AEW as he was fired following a legitimate backstage altercation at the event.

== Production ==
=== Background ===
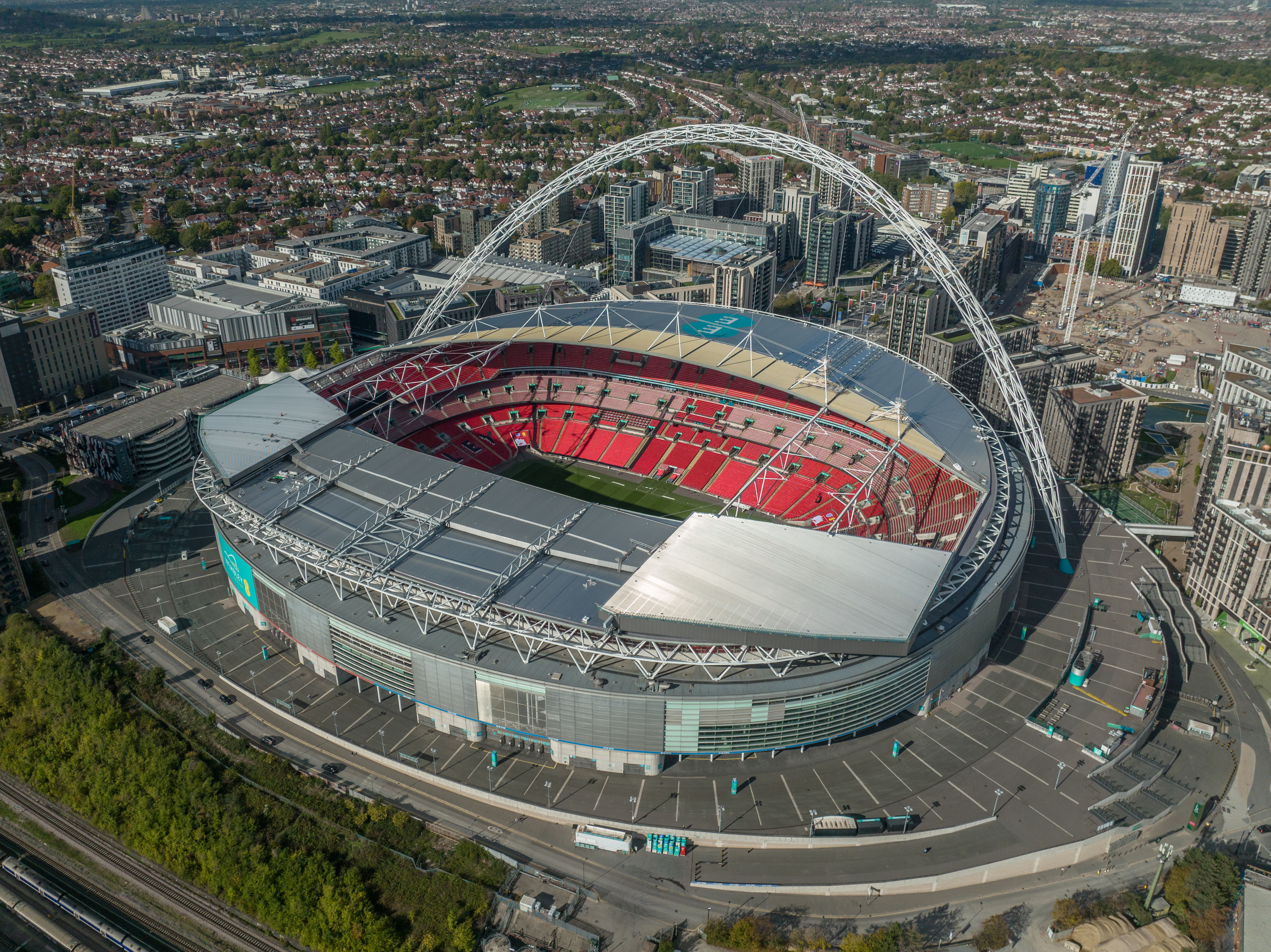
The event was held at Wembley Stadium in London, England, marking All Elite Wrestling's first pay-per-view event held outside of North America.

The inaugural All In was a professional wrestling pay-per-view (PPV) event that was independently produced by members of The Elite in association with Ring of Honor (ROH) and held in September 2018 at the former Sears Centre Arena (renamed to Now Arena in September 2020) in Hoffman Estates, Illinois. The event was notable for being the first professional wrestling event in the United States not promoted by WWE or World Championship Wrestling (WCW) to sell 10,000 tickets since 1993. The success of the show would lead to the formation of the American promotion All Elite Wrestling (AEW) in January 2019, with The Elite becoming executive vice presidents of the company. On the first anniversary of All In, AEW established a spiritual successor titled All Out. In March 2022, AEW president Tony Khan announced his purchase of ROH, in turn obtaining the rights to All In, which were owned by ROH.

On the April 5, 2023, episode of AEW Dynamite, AEW announced that they would revive the All In name for a major event to be held at Wembley Stadium in London, England during the United Kingdom's August Bank Holiday weekend on August 27, titled "All In London at Wembley Stadium". The event marked AEW's debut in the United Kingdom and was the promotion's first PPV event to be held outside of North America. AEW had originally planned to host the 2020 Fyter Fest as a PPV in London at nearby Wembley Arena, which would have been the promotion's UK debut, but the COVID-19 pandemic canceled those plans. This also marked the first professional wrestling event to be held at present day Wembley Stadium, with AEW promoting the event as the first in over 30 years at the venue, after WWE's SummerSlam in 1992, which was held at the original Wembley Stadium. The stadium itself promoted it as part of the 100th anniversary of Wembley. This was also AEW's first event to be held in an association football stadium. The event aired live at 1 p.m. Eastern Time (ET) through traditional PPV outlets, as well as Bleacher Report, FITE, and YouTube, and it was preceded by a Zero Hour pre-show at 11 a.m. ET. AEW wrestler Chris Jericho's band Fozzy performed their song "Judas" live at the event for Jericho's ring entrance.

Tickets went on sale on May 5, 2023. During the pre-sale on May 2, the show sold over 36,000 tickets, garnering $4.7 million in revenue, setting AEW's records for attendance and live gate. Those numbers reached over 43,000 and $5.7 million, respectively, the next day. After sales opened on May 5, ticket sales hit 60,000 with $7.7 million in revenue. By July 28, prior to any matches being announced, the event had sold 70,400 tickets with a gate of $9 million. AEW initially stated that the event set a new record for the highest number of paying fans at a professional wrestling event, with 80,846 people in attendance. However, this statement was later revised to clarify that 80,846 tickets had been distributed as of August 18.

=== Storylines ===
All In London at Wembley Stadium featured 11 matches that involved different wrestlers from pre-existing feuds and storylines. Storylines were produced on AEW's weekly television programs, Dynamite, Rampage, and Collision.

In June, AEW World Champion MJF started a rivalry with Adam Cole, who he faced on the June 14 episode of Dynamite in a World Championship Eliminator match, which ended in a 30-minute time-limit draw, thus ruling Cole out of a future championship match. The two were then paired together in the Blind Eliminator Tournament to receive an AEW World Tag Team Championship match on the July 29, 2023, episode of Collision. They won the tournament, but failed to win the tag team titles. During this time, MJF and Cole would become friends, much to the dismay of Cole's old friend Roderick Strong, and MJF promised Cole that regardless of the outcome of the tournament, he would give Cole a match for the AEW World Championship. On the August 2 episode of Dynamite, MJF followed through with his promise, giving Cole a contract which scheduled the championship match as the main event of All In. The following week, in addition to their AEW World Championship match, Cole—who still felt he and MJF could be a championship caliber tag team—challenged Aussie Open (Kyle Fletcher and Mark Davis) for the ROH World Tag Team Championship to take place on All In's Zero Hour pre-show. Aussie Open accepted the challenge on that week's Rampage.

Following FTR's (Cash Wheeler and Dax Harwood) defense of the AEW World Tag Team Championship on the August 5 episode of Collision, they stated they had unfinished business with The Young Bucks (Matt Jackson and Nick Jackson). They subsequently made a challenge for All In with the AEW World Tag Team Championship on the line. The Young Bucks accepted the challenge on Dynamite on August 9, marking the rubber match between the two teams, being tied at 1–1, where The Young Bucks won their first matchup at Full Gear in November 2020, while FTR defeated them on the April 6, 2022, episode of Dynamite.

At Dynamite: 200 on August 2, Hikaru Shida defeated Toni Storm to win the AEW Women's World Championship. The following week, it was announced that at All In, there would be a four-way match for the championship with the participants determined by a single-elimination tournament. Shida was already scheduled to defend the title against Anna Jay that night and defeated her to retain her spot as defending champion at All In, while Storm exercised her rematch clause to receive a bye and automatically be entered into the four-way. Saraya then qualified by defeating Skye Blue during the August 11 episode of Rampage. Dr. Britt Baker, D.M.D. secured the final spot by defeating The Bunny on August 16 at Dynamite: Fight for the Fallen.

Darby Allin and Swerve Strickland have had a years long on-and-off rivalry predating AEW, going back to their days wrestling on the independent circuit in Seattle, Washington, of which Allin is a native, while Strickland hails from nearby Tacoma. The feud intensified on the August 2 episode of Dynamite when Strickland and Mogul Embassy teammate AR Fox (who himself had a history with Allin that also predated AEW) attacked rookie wrestler Nick Wayne—who Allin had taken under his wing as Nick's late father Buddy Wayne trained Allin—at Nick's home gym in Seattle. On the August 9 episode, Allin confronted Strickland and Fox (along with the rest of Mogul Embassy), and Allin's longtime friend/mentor Sting helped Allin fend off the group, setting up a tag team Coffin match at All In, pitting Allin and Sting against Strickland and Fox. On August 23 at Dynamite: Fyter Fest, after Fox and Swerve lost a tornado tag team match to Allin and Wayne with Fox taking the pin, he was kicked out of the Mogul Embassy. After that, Strickland introduced Christian Cage, who Allin had been feuding since late July after he won a shot at Cage's ally Luchasaurus' TNT Championship at All Out, as his new partner for the match.

During the 2023 Owen Hart Cup tournament on the July 8 episode of Collision, CM Punk defeated Samoa Joe for the first time in his career. On the August 5 episode, Joe recapped their rivalry, going back to their time in ROH, and he challenged Punk to a rematch at All In so that he could prove that he was better than Punk and gave him one week to answer. Punk did not answer Joe, who escalated the matter by attacking Punk during Punk's match the following week. During Collision: Fight for the Fallen on August 19, a disguised Punk attacked Joe and accepted the challenge, which was made official with Punk's "Real World Championship" on the line.

== Event ==
Other on-screen personnel
Role	Name
Commentators	Excalibur (Pre-show and PPV)
Commentators	Tony Schiavone (Pre-show and PPV)
Commentators	Taz (Pre-show and PPV)
Commentators	Nigel McGuinness (PPV)
Commentators	Jim Ross (Pre-show and PPV)
Commentators	Don Callis (The Golden Elite vs. Bullet Club Gold & Takeshita)
Ring announcers	Justin Roberts
Ring announcers	Dasha Gonzalez
Referees	Aubrey Edwards
Referees	Bryce Remsburg
Referees	Paul Turner
Referees	Rick Knox
Referees	Stephon Smith
Interviewer	Lexy Nair
Pre-show panel	Renee Paquette
Pre-show panel	Anthony Ogogo
Pre-show panel	Kip Sabian
Pre-show panel	Paul Wight

=== Zero Hour ===
During the All In Zero Hour pre-show, Jeff Jarrett, Karen Jarrett, Sonjay Dutt, and Satnam Singh came out to insult the crowd. Paul Wight, Anthony Ogogo, and Grado then came out to attack Jarrett, Satnam, and Sonjay, with Grado hitting Jarrett with a guitar. Wight then delivered the WMD to Satnam and chokeslammed Jay Lethal.

There were also two matches that took place during Zero Hour. In the first match, Aussie Open (Kyle Fletcher and Mark Davis) defended the ROH World Tag Team Championship against Adam Cole and MJF. Before the match started, Aussie Open attacked Cole and MJF. Cole then delivered a superkick to Fletcher, but Davis then performed a lung blower to Cole for a two-count. As Cole attempted the Panama Sunrise, Davis escaped, but Cole then delivered a superkick. Aussie Open then delivered the Aussie Arrow to MJF for a two-count. MJF then performed a double Kangaroo Kick. MJF and Cole then delivered a double clothesline to Fletcher and pinned him to become the new ROH World Tag Team Champions. With this win, Cole became an ROH Triple Crown winner.

In the second and final match on Zero Hour, Jack Perry defended the FTW Championship against Hook in an FTW Rules match. In the closing stages, Perry delivered a suplex, a Rolling Thunder, and a draping DDT to Hook on top of a car. Hook then delivered a T-bone suplex to Perry on the top of the car. Hook then performed a German suplex for a two-count. Perry then executed three German suplexes and a Tiger Driver for a two-count. As Perry attempted a moonsault, Hook moved out of the way and locked in the Red Rum, forcing Perry to tap out and win the FTW Championship for a record-tying second time.

=== Preliminary matches ===
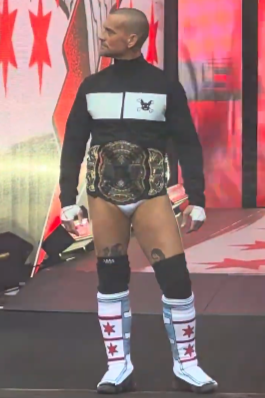
CM Punk making his entrance at All In with the "Real World Championship".

The actual pay-per-view opened with CM Punk defending the "Real World Championship" against Samoa Joe. In the opening stages, as Punk attempted a hurricarana on the outside, Joe countered and swung Punk across the announce table. Joe then delivered a running corner elbow and a Pele kick for a two-count. As Joe attempted the Muscle Buster, Punk escaped and delivered a roundhouse kick and a leg drop for a one-count. Joe then performed a snap powerslam for a two-count. Joe then executed a powerbomb/crossface submission combination, but Punk escaped. As Joe attempted a superplex, Punk bit Joe's face and performed the Pepsi Plunge, then pinned Joe to retain. This was Punk's final match in AEW, as on September 2, 2023, his contract was terminated for cause.

In the second match, Bullet Club Gold (Jay White, Juice Robinson, and Konosuke Takeshita) (accompanied by Austin Gunn, Colten Gunn, and Don Callis) faced The Golden Elite (Kenny Omega, Kota Ibushi, and "Hangman" Adam Page). In the closing stages, Ibushi delivered a lariat and a standing moonsault to White, but Takeshita broke up the pin. Omega then performed dragon suplexes to White and Robinson each, but Takeshita hit a Blue Thunder Driver to Omega for a two-count. Omega then delivered a reverse Frankensteiner to Takeshita for a two-count. Hangman then performed a Buckshot Lariat to Takeshita, allowing Omega to hit V-Triggers to Robinson and White each. Takeshita then pinned Omega with the schoolboy to score the victory for his team.

Next, FTR (Cash Wheeler and Dax Harwood) defended the AEW World Tag Team Championship against The Young Bucks (Matt Jackson and Nick Jackson). In the opening stages, Nick delivered a corkscrew moonsault on the outside to FTR. Nick then performed a senton to Wheeler for a two-count. Harwood then executed three German suplexes to Matt, but Nick then performed Northern Lights suplexes to Harwood for a two-count. FTR then delivered an assisted piledriver to Nick for a near fall. As The Young Bucks attempted the BTE Trigger, Wheeler pushed Nick to the outside, allowing FTR to hit the Shatter Machine to Matt for a two-count. The Young Bucks then delivered two BTE Triggers to Wheeler for a two-count. As the Bucks attempted the Meltzer Driver, FTR countered into the Shatter Machine to Nick, with Wheeler pinning him to retain.

After that was the Stadium Stampede match, which pitted the team of Eddie Kingston, Penta El Zero Miedo, Best Friends (Chuck Taylor and Trent Beretta), and Orange Cassidy (accompanied by Alex Abrahantes) against the team of Blackpool Combat Club (Jon Moxley, Claudio Castagnoli, and Wheeler Yuta), Mike Santana, and Ortiz. In the opening stages, Penta delivered double slingblades to both Santana and Ortiz. Penta then hit a diving DDT to Ortiz. Penta then performed a chair backstabber to Santana. Penta then delivered the Made in Japan to Moxley for a one-count. Santana then performed a powerbomb and a piledriver to Penta onto a pile of chairs. Yuta then hit a vertical suplex to Kingston onto the guard rail. Moxley then delivered an X-Plex to Beretta onto a barbed wire board, allowing Ortiz to hit a diving splash for a two-count. Penta then delivered a sunset flip powerbomb to Santana through a table. Beretta then performed a superplex to Ortiz through a table on the outside. As Castagnoli attempted the Ricola Bomb on Cassidy, he escaped and hit Castagnoli with the Orange Punch for a two-count. Cassidy then delivered a DDT to Moxley on broken glass, but Castagnoli performed a Very European Uppercut to Cassidy. Kingston then hit spinning backfists to Moxley and Castagnoli, allowing Cassidy to hit Castagnoli with the Orange Punch with broken glass duct-taped to his hand for the three-count to win.

In the next match, Hikaru Shida defended the AEW Women's World Championship against Saraya, Toni Storm, and Dr. Britt Baker, D.M.D. in a four-way match. In the closing stages, Baker delivered a powerbomb/neckbreaker combination to Storm for a two-count. Baker then performed a slingblade to Storm, but Saraya hit a running hip attack on Shida. Baker delivered a superkick to Storm, who landed on Saraya and the referee began counting the pin but Saraya kicked out. Saraya then locked in a Scorpion Deathlock on Storm, and Baker performed a curb stomp on Storm and Saraya for a nearfall. Shida then hit a Falcon Arrow to Baker and the Katana to Saraya for a near fall. Baker then locked in the Lockjaw on Shida, but as Storm attempted to break up the submission, Saraya sprayed Storm with a spray can and delivered the Nightcap and pinned Storm to win the AEW Women's World Championship. After the match, Saraya celebrated with her family.

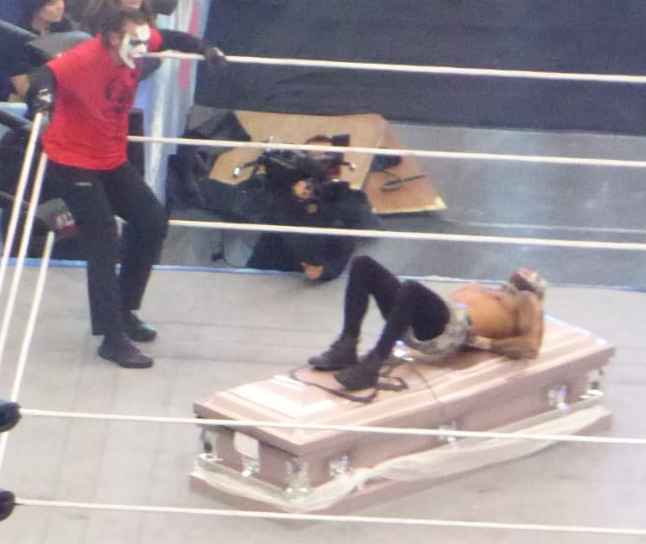
Sting (left) and Darby Allin (right) in a coffin match at the event.

After that, Darby Allin and Sting (who revived his "Joker Sting" facepaint for the event) battled Christian Cage and Swerve Strickland (accompanied by Prince Nana) in a coffin match. In the opening moments, Strickland and Christian delivered simultaneous spears to Allin and Sting. Allin then performed a Stundog Millionaire and a cannonball dive to Strickland. After Luchasaurus interfered on behalf of Cage and Strickland, Nick Wayne attacked him with a skateboard, but was beaten down and carried from ringside by Luchasaurus. Sting then locked in the Scorpion Deathlock on Christian, but Strickland hit Sting with a chair, allowing Christian to hit a low blow on Sting with a baseball bat. Strickland then delivered the Swerve Stomp and put Sting into the coffin, but Sting used the baseball bat to prevent the lid of the coffin from closing. As Strickland attempted a 450° splash to Sting on top of the coffin, Sting moved out of the way and delivered the Scorpion Deathdrop on top of the coffin. Allin then performed the Coffin Drop to Strickland on top of the coffin and shut the lid to win the match.

Next, Chris Jericho (accompanied by Sammy Guevara) faced Will Ospreay (accompanied by Don Callis). In the opening stages, Ospreay delivered a Sky Twister Press and a diving elbow drop for a two-count. Jericho then performed a vertical suplex and a German suplex on the apron for a two-count. Ospreay then hit a handspring enzuigiri and a standing shooting star press for a near fall. As Jericho attempted the Lionsault, Ospreay got his knees up and delivered another Shooting Star Press for a near fall. Jericho then performed a Frankensteiner and the Judas Effect for a two-count. Ospreay then delivered the OsCutter for a near fall. As Ospreay attempted the Storm Breaker, Jericho countered it into the Walls of Jericho, but Ospreay escaped. Ospreay then delivered a Spanish fly, but as he attempted another Storm Breaker, Jericho hit a low blow (unbeknownst to the referee) and the Judas Effect for another near fall. Ospreay then performed the Hidden Blade and the Storm Breaker for another near fall. Ospreay then executed another Hidden Blade and the Storm Breaker to win.

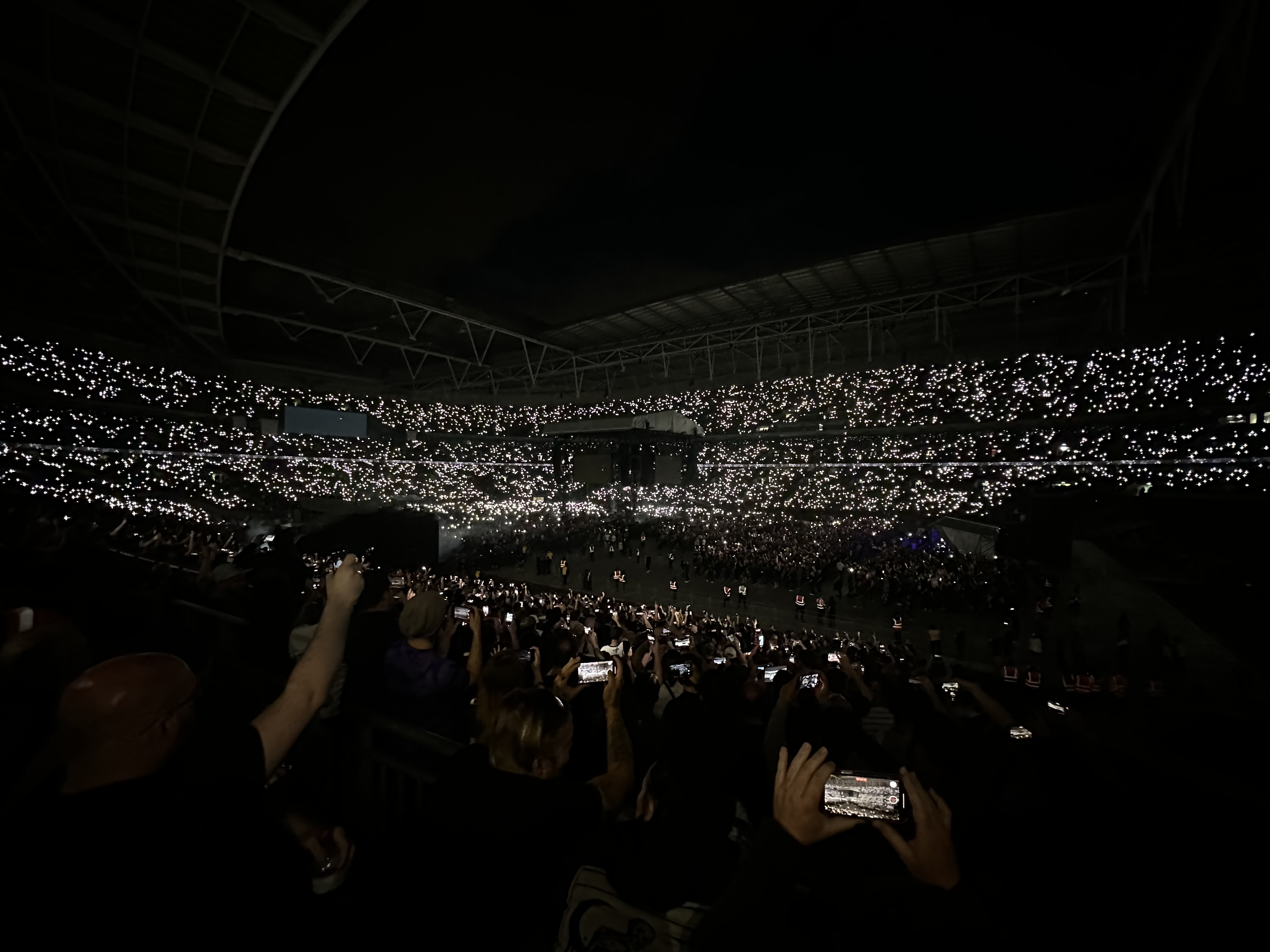
Fans pay tribute to WWE wrestler Bray Wyatt, who died three days before the event, by lighting their mobile phone flashlights during The House of Black's entrance.

In the penultimate match, The House of Black (Malakai Black, Brody King, and Buddy Matthews) (accompanied by Julia Hart) defended the AEW World Trios Championship in a House Rules No Holds Barred match against Billy Gunn and The Acclaimed (Anthony Bowens and Max Caster). In the closing stages, Bowens performed The Arrival, but King delivered a lariat to Gunn. Malakai then delivered a diving Meteora to Caster. As King attempted a forearm punch to Bowens, he dodged, causing King to unintentionally hit Malakai. Gunn then delivered a Fameasser to Matthews, but as he attempted a pin, Hart pulled referee Aubrey Edwards out of the ring. Malakai then delivered the Black Mass to Gunn for a two-count. Bowens and Caster then performed The Arrival/Mic Drop combination to King for a one-count. Gunn then delivered the Fameasser to King, allowing Caster and Bowens to again hit The Arrival/Mic Drop combination to score the pin and win the AEW World Trios Championship.

=== Main event ===
In the main event, MJF defended the AEW World Championship against Adam Cole. In the opening stages, Cole shook MJF's hand, but MJF poked his eye. Cole then delivered a roundhouse kick to MJF for a two-count. MJF then performed a powerbomb unto his knee to Cole. Cole then hit a superkick and a Heat Seeker for a two-count. Cole then delivered a brainbuster on the steps to MJF, followed by a tombstone piledriver through the announce table. MJF and Cole then delivered a double clothesline to each other and then pinned each other simultaneously, thus the match ended in a draw. Cole and MJF then agreed to restart the match. MJF then used a schoolboy pin on Cole for a two-count. Cole then delivered an apron brainbuster and a Panama Sunrise to MJF for a near fall. As Cole attempted the deliver another Panama Sunrise, Cole unintentionally delivered the move to the referee. Roderick Strong then came out and delivered a low blow to MJF, allowing Cole to perform another Panama Sunrise and The Boom for another near fall. As Cole attempted to hit MJF with the AEW World Championship belt, Cole dropped it, allowing MJF to use a schoolboy pin on Cole to retain the title. After the match, MJF consoled Cole, but Cole threw the ROH World Tag Team Championship belt away. MJF then gave Cole the AEW World Championship belt and asked Cole to hit him, but Cole refused to do it and instead hugged MJF. The event ended with fireworks being shot from the roofs of Wembley Stadium and confetti showering down onto the ring over the two wrestlers, as they posed with their title belts.

== Box office ==
During All In, AEW claimed the event set the paid attendance record of 81,035; however, this was disputed, with the city government reporting that it had a turnstile attendance of 72,265. It was then clarified that the number of tickets sold was 81,035 and that the total of both paid and complimentary tickets were in the 84,000–85,000 range. This is not including the two-day Collision in Korea event in April 1995, which holds the record for largest attended professional wrestling event, as although tickets were sold, most of the spectators attended for free. Despite the disputed attendance numbers, the event's live gate of over US$9 million marks the largest professional wrestling live gate for a show not promoted by WWE, New Japan Pro-Wrestling (NJPW), or WCW; WWE's WrestleMania 32 holds the record of the largest live gate in professional wrestling history overall at US$17.3 million equivalent to $23,208,000 in 2025), while Collision in Korea day two grossed US$8.5 million (equivalent to $15,847,000 in 2025).

== Pre-show backstage altercation ==
Sometime during AEW's tour of Canada in late June and early July, Jack Perry had an upcoming vacation planned and wanted to use real glass in a segment on Collision to write himself off television. CM Punk, who was also working for AEW as a consultant and had booking power on Collision, disagreed with this, citing the legitimate risk of using real glass, with the production team, doctors, and Tony Schiavone also against Perry using real glass. During All In's Zero Hour pre-show, right before Perry was suplexed through the windshield of a vehicle, he looked into the camera and said that it was "real glass, go cry me a river", a reference to Punk's disapproval and subsequent condemnation by a section of fans when the original glass story was leaked. When Perry went backstage after his match, and just before Punk was about to go out for his, a confrontation occurred which led to Punk shoving Perry, leading into Punk attempting to put him in a guillotine choke. He also stepped toward AEW president Tony Khan, but was held back by Chris Hero and a producer, who helped break up the fight along with Samoa Joe and a referee, who were holding Perry back. The backstage footage shows Tony Khan trying to fix the monitors before Punk steps towards him in what is speculated to be the lunge that made Khan feel endangered, before being pulled away and approached by Malakai Black. Punk then proceeded to have a match with Joe in the first bout of the PPV for the "Real" World Championship. On September 2, following the conclusion of the investigation, AEW terminated Punk's contract with just cause under the unanimous recommendation of the AEW disciplinary committee, as well as outside legal counsel. This came one year after Punk's involvement in a backstage altercation following his participation in the 2022 post-event media scrum for All Out. Also upon the conclusion of the investigation, it was decided that Perry would remain suspended indefinitely.

In a statement made by Khan during the opening of the September 2 episode of Collision, he said, "The incident was regrettable and it endangered people backstage. That includes the production staff who put the show on every week, innocent people who had nothing to do with it." Regarding Punk allegedly lunging at Khan, he further stated, "I've been going to wrestling shows for over 30 years. I've been producing them on [TNT] for four years. Never in all that time have I ever felt until last Sunday that my security, my safety, my life was in danger at a wrestling show. I don't feel anyone should feel that way at work. I don't think the people I work with should feel that way and I had to make a very difficult choice today."

Three months later on November 25, after nearly 10 years, Punk returned to WWE at Survivor Series: WarGames in his hometown of Chicago, Illinois. The All In incident would be referred to on the December 8 episode of Friday Night SmackDown where Punk sarcastically commented, "I don't know who would feel comfortable working with someone who just punches people in the face backstage. It's 2023, you can't be doing stuff like that. It's insane." In kayfabe, the promo itself was about Kevin Owens punching Austin Theory and Grayson Waller in the face during a scripted backstage segment. Jack Perry would then make his first appearance since the incident at New Japan Pro-Wrestling's (NJPW) Battle in the Valley event on January 13, 2024, where he attacked Shota Umino. He subsequently tore up his AEW contract and put on an arm band that said "scapegoat". He then took on the moniker of Scapegoat and continued to appear in NJPW until mid-April 2024.

Punk directly addressed the altercation on the April 1, 2024, episode of Ariel Helwani's The MMA Hour, saying that there was no non-disclosure agreement regarding the brawl. Punk stated that he had walked up to Perry and asked "why [he] insist[ed] on doing this dumb internet shit on TV", and after a heated argument he put Perry in a chokehold until Samoa Joe broke the fight up; Punk then told Khan that he was resigning on the spot, but was quickly convinced to work the match by Joe and producer Jerry Lynn. In response to the Helwani interview, AEW aired the surveillance footage of the altercation during the April 10 episode of Dynamite, which showed Punk in conversation with Perry before initiating physical contact by shoving Perry and then choking him until the scuffle was broken up seconds later. In kayfabe, it was presented by The Young Bucks to further their feud with FTR—who are real-life friends with Punk—prior to their match at Dynasty on April 21, stating the altercation was the reason they lost their match to FTR at All In and conspired that FTR were the masterminds behind the incident while also siding with Perry. The segment was widely panned by critics and fans alike, to the extent that it received WrestleCrap's "Gooker Award" for that year. At Dynasty, Perry made his return to AEW and helped The Young Bucks to defeat FTR and win the AEW World Tag Team Championship.

== Results ==
No.	Results	Stipulations	Times
1^{P}	Better Than You Bay Bay (Adam Cole and MJF) defeated Aussie Open (Kyle Fletcher and Mark Davis) (c) by pinfall	Tag team match for the ROH World Tag Team Championship	7:45
2^{P}	Hook defeated Jack Perry (c) by submission	FTW Rules match for the FTW Championship	8:20
3	CM Punk (c) defeated Samoa Joe by pinfall	Singles match for the "Real World Championship"	14:00
4	Bullet Club Gold (Jay White and Juice Robinson) and Konosuke Takeshita (with Austin Gunn, Colten Gunn, and Don Callis) defeated The Golden Elite ("Hangman" Adam Page, Kenny Omega, and Kota Ibushi) by pinfall	Trios match	20:30
5	FTR (Cash Wheeler and Dax Harwood) (c) defeated The Young Bucks (Matt Jackson and Nick Jackson) by pinfall	Tag team match for the AEW World Tag Team Championship	21:45
6	Eddie Kingston, Penta El Zero Miedo, Best Friends (Chuck Taylor and Trent Beretta), and Orange Cassidy defeated Blackpool Combat Club (Claudio Castagnoli, Jon Moxley, and Wheeler Yuta), Mike Santana, and Ortiz by pinfall	Stadium Stampede match	21:30
7	Saraya defeated Hikaru Shida (c), Dr. Britt Baker, D.M.D., and Toni Storm by pinfall	Four-way match for the AEW Women's World Championship	8:50
8	Darby Allin and Sting defeated Christian Cage and Swerve Strickland (with Prince Nana)	Coffin match	16:00
9	Will Ospreay (with Don Callis) defeated Chris Jericho (with Sammy Guevara) by pinfall	Singles match	14:55
10	The Acclaimed (Anthony Bowens and Max Caster) and Billy Gunn defeated House of Black (Brody King, Buddy Matthews, and Malakai Black) (c) (with Julia Hart) by pinfall	"House Rules" trios match for the AEW World Trios Championship; The Acclaimed's stipulation was No Holds Barred.	10:50
11	MJF (c) defeated Adam Cole by pinfall (Note: The match initially ended in a draw due to a double pinfall but was immediately restarted.)	Singles match for the AEW World Championship	29:00
(c) / – the champion(s) heading into the match; P / – the match was broadcast on the pre-show

=== AEW Women's World Championship qualifier tournament bracket ===
Qualifiers; Dynamite (August 9); Rampage (August 11); Dynamite: Fight for the Fallen (August 16)
Toni Storm	Bye (Note: Toni Storm lost the AEW Women's World Championship to Hikaru Shida on the August 2, 2023, episode of Dynamite and exercised her championship rematch clause to receive a bye in the tournament.)
–	–
Hikaru Shida (c) (Note: Hikaru Shida was already scheduled to defend the AEW Women's World Championship against Anna Jay on the August 9, 2023, episode of Dynamite prior to the announcement of the tournament. This match decided who would be the defending champion at All In.)	Pin
Anna Jay	8:45
Saraya	Pin
Skye Blue	9:30
Dr. Britt Baker, D.M.D.	Pin
The Bunny	7:25

Final; All In (August 27)
Toni Storm	8:50
Hikaru Shida (c)	—
Saraya	Pin
Dr. Britt Baker, D.M.D.	—
