= Fyter Fest (2021) =

All Elite Wrestling two-part television special

- Promotional poster featuring various AEW wrestlers
- Promotion: All Elite Wrestling
- Date: July 14 and 21, 2021
- City: Cedar Park, Texas (July 14); Garland, Texas (July 21)
- Venue: H-E-B Center at Cedar Park (July 14); Curtis Culwell Center (July 21)
- Attendance: Night 1: 4,680; Night 2: 5,688

Fyter Fest chronology
← Previous; 2020	Next → 2022

AEW Dynamite special episodes chronology
← Previous; Road Rager	Next → Fight for the Fallen

The 2021 Fyter Fest was a two-part professional wrestling television special produced by All Elite Wrestling (AEW). It was the third annual Fyter Fest and took place on July 14 and 21, 2021, at the H-E-B Center at Cedar Park in Cedar Park, Texas and the Curtis Culwell Center in Garland, Texas, respectively. The event aired live on TNT as a two-part series of special episodes of AEW's weekly television program, Wednesday Night Dynamite. The two-week event was also the second event in AEW's "Welcome Back" tour, which celebrated AEW's resumption of live touring during the COVID-19 pandemic.

== Production ==
=== Background ===
Fyter Fest is a professional wrestling event held annually during the summer by All Elite Wrestling (AEW) since 2019; it was originally held in June before moving to July in 2020. Due to the COVID-19 pandemic that began effecting the industry in mid-March 2020, AEW held the majority of their programs from Daily's Place in Jacksonville, Florida; these events were originally held without fans, but the company began running shows at 10–15% capacity in August, before eventually running full capacity shows in May 2021. Also in May, AEW announced that they would be returning to live touring, beginning with a special episode of Dynamite titled Road Rager on July 7. The third Fyter Fest was announced to be held as the second event of AEW's "Welcome Back" tour and like the 2020 event, it was scheduled as a live two-part special of Dynamite on TNT. The first night was held on July 14 at the H-E-B Center at Cedar Park in Cedar Park, Texas (Austin market) while the second night was held on July 21 at the Curtis Culwell Center in Garland, Texas (Dallas–Fort Worth market).

=== Storylines ===
Fyter Fest featured professional wrestling matches that involved different wrestlers from pre-existing scripted feuds and storylines. Storylines were produced on AEW's weekly television program, Dynamite, the supplementary online streaming shows, Dark and Elevation, and The Young Bucks' YouTube series Being The Elite.

== Reception ==
=== Television ratings ===
The first night of Fyter Fest averaged 1,025,000 television viewers on TNT, with a 0.40 rating in AEW's key demographic. The second night of Fyter Fest drew 1,148,000 viewers, and a 0.44 rating in the key demographic.

== Results ==
Night 1 (July 14)
No.	Results	Stipulations	Times
1	Jon Moxley (c) defeated Karl Anderson	Singles match for the IWGP United States Heavyweight Championship	11:12
2	Ricky Starks (with Hook and Powerhouse Hobbs) defeated Brian Cage (c)	Singles match for the FTW Championship	9:52
3	Christian Cage defeated Matt Hardy	Singles match	13:07
4	Sammy Guevara defeated Wheeler Yuta (with Chuck Taylor and Orange Cassidy)	Singles match	4:33
5	Yuka Sakazaki defeated Penelope Ford	Singles match	6:45
6	Darby Allin defeated Ethan Page	Coffin match	15:22
(c) / – the champion(s) heading into the match

Night 2 (July 21)
No.	Results	Stipulations	Times
1	Chris Jericho defeated Shawn Spears (with Tully Blanchard)	Chairs match The stipulation only applied to Spears; Jericho had to wrestle under normal singles match rules.	10:47
2	Doc Gallows (with Karl Anderson) defeated Frankie Kazarian	Singles match	6:53
3	Darby Allin (with Sting) defeated Wheeler Yuta (with Orange Cassidy)	Singles match	4:00
4	Dr. Britt Baker, D.M.D. (c) (with Rebel) defeated Nyla Rose (with Vickie Guerrero) by submission	Singles match for the AEW Women's World Championship	12:11
5	Orange Cassidy (with Kris Statlander) defeated The Blade (with The Bunny)	Singles match	8:37
6	Lance Archer (with Jake Roberts) defeated Jon Moxley (c) by knockout	Texas Death match for the IWGP United States Heavyweight Championship; Match could be won by knockout or submission.	13:09
(c) / – the champion(s) heading into the match

== See also ==
- 2021 in professional wrestling
