= Fyter Fest (2025) =

All Elite Wrestling two-part television special

- Promotional poster featuring Swerve Strickland, "Timeless" Toni Storm, Kenny Omega, Mercedes Moné, and MJF
- Promotion: All Elite Wrestling
- Date: June 4, 2025
- City: Denver, Colorado
- Venue: Mission Ballroom
- Attendance: 2,500

Fyter Fest chronology
← Previous; 2023	Next → —

AEW Dynamite special episodes chronology
← Previous; Beach Break	Next → Summer Blockbuster

AEW Collision special episodes chronology
← Previous; Beach Break	Next → Summer Blockbuster

The 2025 Fyter Fest was a two-part professional wrestling television special produced by All Elite Wrestling (AEW). It was the sixth Fyter Fest and took place on Wednesday, June 4, 2025, at the Mission Ballroom in Denver, Colorado. The event was broadcast live as a four-hour marathon of back-to-back special episodes of AEW's weekly television programs, Dynamite and Collision. Both programs aired on TBS and were simulcast on Max in the United States.

Dynamite aired in its regular 8:00 p.m. Eastern Time (ET) slot while Collision, which normally airs on Saturdays on TNT, aired immediately after Dynamite at 10:00 p.m. ET. Collision was preempted from its regular Saturday night timeslot to accommodate TNT's coverage of the 2025 Stanley Cup playoffs. This was also the first Fyter Fest since 2023.

There were 11 matches held across the four-hour broadcast, with five on Dynamite and then six on Collision. In the main event of Fyter Fest, which was Collision's main event, The Paragon (Adam Cole, Kyle O'Reilly, and Roderick Strong) and Daniel Garcia defeated The Don Callis Family (Josh Alexander, Lance Archer, Trent Beretta, and Rocky Romero) in an eight-man tag team match. This broadcast also saw the AEW in-ring debut of Thekla, who defeated Lady Frost, as well as the return of Tay Melo, who had been on maternity leave from AEW since January 2023. In the main event of Dynamite, Kenny Omega defeated Brody King, Claudio Castagnoli, and Máscara Dorada in a four-way match to retain the AEW International Championship.

== Production ==
=== Background ===
Fyter Fest is a professional wrestling event held during the summer by All Elite Wrestling (AEW) that was previously held annually from 2019 until 2023. An event was not held in 2024, but during the April 5, 2025, episode of Saturday Night Collision, it was announced that Fyter Fest would return on June 4, 2025, emanating from the Mission Ballroom in Denver, Colorado. The sixth Fyter Fest was scheduled to air live as a four-hour marathon of back-to-back special episodes of Wednesday Night Dynamite and Collision, the latter preempted from its usual Saturday night timeslot and network, TNT, to accommodate for the 2025 Stanley Cup playoffs. Dynamite aired in its normal timeslot of 8:00 p.m. Eastern Time (ET) on TBS, while Collision immediately followed at 10:00 p.m. ET on the same channel, with the entire four-hour television special simulcast on Max.

=== Storylines ===
Fyter Fest featured professional wrestling matches that involved different wrestlers from pre-existing scripted feuds and storylines. Storylines were produced on AEW's weekly television programs, Dynamite and Collision.

== Results ==
Dynamite (aired live June 4)
No.	Results	Stipulations	Times
1	Jon Moxley (with Marina Shafir and Wheeler Yuta) defeated Mark Briscoe by technical submission	Singles match	13:28
2	"Timeless" Toni Storm and Mina Shirakawa defeated Skye Blue and Julia Hart by submission	Tag team match	9:43
3	Komander, Kevin Knight, and "Speedball" Mike Bailey (with Alex Abrahantes) defeated La Facción Ingobernable (Rush, The Beast Mortos, and Dralístico) by pinfall	Six-man tag team match	13:48
4	Powerhouse Hobbs defeated Max Caster by pinfall	Singles match	0:47
5	Kenny Omega (c) defeated Brody King, Claudio Castagnoli, and Máscara Dorada by pinfall	Four-way match for the AEW International Championship	17:37
(c) / – the champion(s) heading into the match

Collision (aired live June 4 immediately after Dynamite)
No.	Results	Stipulations	Times
1	Will Ospreay defeated Lio Rush (with Action Andretti) by pinfall	Singles match	9:00
2	FTR (Dax Harwood and Cash Wheeler) (with Stokely) defeated Templario and Atlantis Jr. by pinfall	Tag team match	13:45
3	The Don Callis Family (Kyle Fletcher and Konosuke Takeshita) and Hechicero (with Don Callis) defeated Bandido and The Outrunners (Truth Magnum and Turbo Floyd) by pinfall	Six-man tag team match	14:20
4	Nick Wayne (c) (with Christian Cage and Mother Wayne) defeated Sammy Guevara, AR Fox, and Lee Johnson (with Blake Christian) by pinfall	Four-way match for the ROH World Television Championship	11:10
5	Thekla defeated Lady Frost by submission	Singles match	2:30
6	The Paragon (Adam Cole, Kyle O'Reilly, and Roderick Strong) and Daniel Garcia (with "Daddy Magic" Matt Menard) defeated The Don Callis Family (Josh Alexander, Lance Archer, Trent Beretta, and Rocky Romero) (with Don Callis) by pinfall	Eight-man tag team match	11:20
(c) / – the champion(s) heading into the match

=== International Championship Tournament ===
Qualifiers; Dynamite (May 28); Collision (May 31)
(Canada) Kenny Omega (c)
Bye
(Mexico) Hechicero	15:00
(Mexico) Máscara Dorada	Pin
(Canada) Josh Alexander	14:15
(United States) Brody King	Pin
(Switzerland) Claudio Castagnoli	Pin
(Mexico) Komander	7:30

Final; Fyter Fest (June 4)
(Canada) Kenny Omega (c)	Pin
(Mexico) Máscara Dorada	17:37
(United States) Brody King
(Switzerland) Claudio Castagnoli
