= Fyter Fest (2019) =

All Elite Wrestling special event

- Promotional poster featuring various AEW wrestlers
- Promotion: All Elite Wrestling
- Date: June 29, 2019
- City: Daytona Beach, Florida
- Venue: Ocean Center
- Attendance: ~5,000
- Tagline: The Most Luxurious Gaming & Wrestling Festival of All Time!

Event chronology
← Previous; Double or Nothing	Next → Fight for the Fallen

Fyter Fest chronology
← Previous; First	Next → 2020

Community Effort Orlando Wrestling Event chronology
← Previous; CEOxNJPW: When Worlds Collide	Next → Sukeban Miami

The 2019 Fyter Fest was a professional wrestling livestreaming event produced by All Elite Wrestling (AEW) in co-sponsorship with Community Effort Orlando (CEO). It was the inaugural Fyter Fest and took place on June 29, 2019, at the Ocean Center in Daytona Beach, Florida, alongside that year's CEO fighting game event. The name, slogan, and logo of the event parodied the fraudulent Fyre Festival. The event was livestreamed for free on B/R Live in North America and was available through pay-per-view internationally. It was CEO's second professional wrestling event at the Ocean Center, following the previous year's CEOxNJPW: When Worlds Collide, which was in co-sponsorship with New Japan Pro-Wrestling (NJPW).

The card comprised nine matches, including three on the Buy In pre-show. In the main event, Jon Moxley defeated Joey Janela in an unsanctioned match. In other prominent matches, The Elite (Kenny Omega, Matt Jackson, and Nick Jackson) defeated the Lucha Brothers (Pentagón Jr. and Rey Fénix) and Laredo Kid in a six-man tag team match, and Cody vs. Darby Allin ended in a time limit draw.

== Production ==
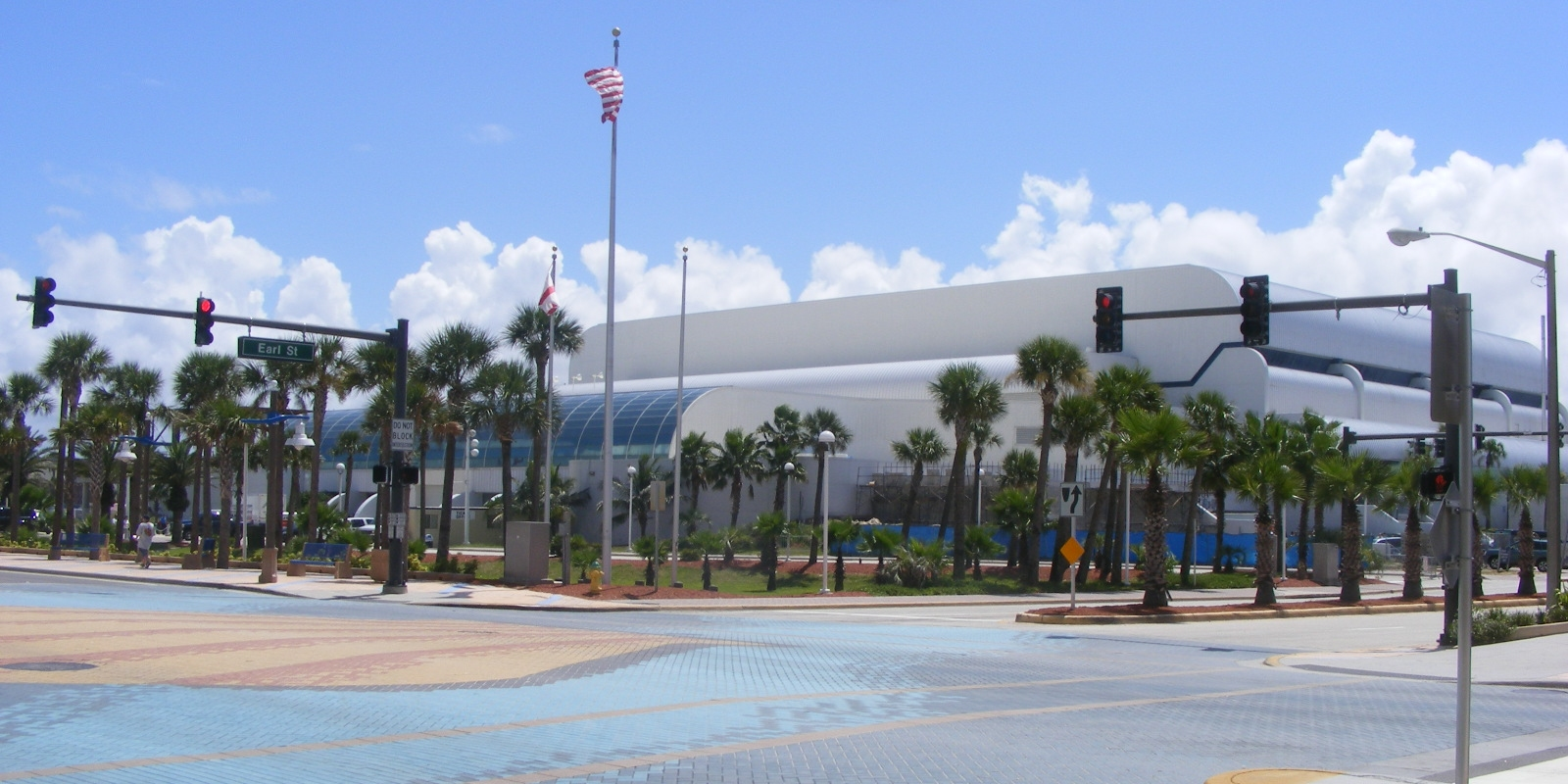
The inaugural Fyter Fest was held at the Ocean Center in Daytona Beach, Florida.

=== Background ===
In June 2018, Community Effort Orlando (CEO) partnered with New Japan Pro-Wrestling (NJPW) to produce CEO's first professional wrestling event called CEOxNJPW: When Worlds Collide. The show took place as part of the CEO fighting game event. For 2019's gaming event, CEO partnered with the American promotion All Elite Wrestling (AEW), which was founded earlier that year in January. This partnership came by way of AEW Executive Vice President and wrestler Kenny Omega, a former prominent wrestler of NJPW who was responsible for organizing the 2018 event. Through this partnership, AEW produced a second wrestling show for CEO called Fyter Fest. The name, logo, and slogan of the event parodied the fraudulent Fyre Festival.

Following AEW's inaugural event Double or Nothing in May, Fyter Fest was scheduled as the company's second-ever event, which took place on Saturday, June 29, 2019, at Ocean Center in Daytona Beach, Florida, the same venue as the previous year's CEOxNJPW event. On June 10, it was announced that Fyter Fest would air for free in the United States on the B/R Live streaming service and would be available on pay-per-view internationally.

=== Storylines ===
Fyter Fest comprised nine professional wrestling matches, including three on the pre-show, that involved different wrestlers from pre-existing scripted feuds and storylines. Storylines were produced on The Young Bucks' YouTube series Being The Elite and Cody's Nightmare Family YouTube series The Road to Fyter Fest.

On Being The Elite, it was shown that Joey Janela had confronted Jon Moxley right after the latter's debut at Double or Nothing. During the segment, Janela laughed at Moxley and lit a cigarette. Moxley took the cigarette, smoked a quick bit of it, and blew smoke in Janela’s face before exiting. A couple of days later, a match between the two was scheduled for Fyter Fest. Just prior to the event, their match was made a non-sanctioned match.

At Double or Nothing, the AEW World Championship belt was unveiled by wrestling legend Bret Hart. Hart brought out Adam Page, who won the pre-show's Casino Battle Royale to challenge for the title (later confirmed for All Out). They were interrupted by MJF, who taunted both Hart and Page. Page went to attack MJF, who backed off. As MJF tried exiting the arena, he was confronted by Jungle Boy and Jimmy Havoc. Page, Jungle Boy, and Havoc then proceeded to attack MJF. In humorous segments on Being The Elite, Page wanted a match against MJF at Fyter Fest, but was misunderstood and matches against Jungle Boy and Havoc, respectively, were promoted until it was finally announced that Page, Jungle Boy, Havoc, and MJF would face each other in a four-way match at the event.

During the pre-show of CEOxNJPW in June 2018, CEO organizer Alex Jebailey defeated Michael Nakazawa. On Being The Elite a year later, a rematch between the two was scheduled for the Fyter Fest pre-show and as a hardcore match.

Prior to the event, it was announced that Best Friends (Chuck Taylor and Trent Beretta), SoCal Uncensored (represented by Frankie Kazarian and Scorpio Sky), and Private Party (Isiah Kassidy and Marq Quen) would face each other in a three-way tag team match on the Fyter Fest pre-show with the winning team advancing to All Out on August 31 for an opportunity at a first round bye in the AEW World Tag Team Championship tournament.

== Event ==
Other on-screen personnel
Role	Name
Commentators	Jim Ross (PPV)
Commentators	Excalibur (Pre-show + PPV)
Commentators	Goldenboy (Pre-show + PPV)
Commentators	Logan Sama (Pre-show)
Commentators	Kip Sabian (Four-way match)
Ring announcer	Justin Roberts
Referees	Aubrey Edwards
Referees	Bryce Remsburg
Referees	Rick Knox

=== The Buy In ===
Three matches occurred during The Buy In. In the first, Best Friends (Chuck Taylor and Trent Beretta), SoCal Uncensored (Frankie Kazarian and Scorpio Sky), and Private Party (Isiah Kassidy and Marq Quen) competed to advance to All Out for an opportunity at a first round bye in the AEW World Tag Team Championship tournament. Taylor and Beretta performed Strong Zero on Kassidy to win.

Next, Allie faced Leva Bates. Allie performed a Superkick on Bates to win.

Finally, Michael Nakazawa faced Alex Jebailey in a Hardcore match. Nakazawa pinned Jebailey with a roll up to win.

=== Preliminary matches ===
The event opened with Christopher Daniels facing Cima. Cima performed a Meteora on Daniels to win.

Next, Riho, Yuka Sakazaki, and Nyla Rose competed in a three-way match. Riho pinned Rose with a roll up to win.

After that, Adam Page, MJF, Jungle Boy, and Jimmy Havoc fought in a four-way match. Page performed a Dead Eye on Havoc to win.

Later, Cody faced Darby Allin. In the end, Cody performed a Cross Rhodes on Allin, but during the pin, as referee Aubrey Edwards had counted two, the bell sounded to signify the end of the 20-minute time limit. As a result, the match was ruled a draw. After the match, Shawn Spears appeared and struck Cody with an unprotected chair shot to Cody's head, causing Cody to bleed.

In the penultimate match, The Elite (Kenny Omega, Matt Jackson, and Nick Jackson) faced the Lucha Brothers (Pentagon Jr and Rey Fenix) and Laredo Kid. Omega performed a One-Winged Angel on Kid to win.

=== Main event ===
In the event's final contest, Jon Moxley faced Joey Janela in an unsanctioned match, a match not officially recognized by AEW. Janela performed a Russian Legsweep off the ring apron through a table on Moxley. Moxley tackled Janela through a table. Janela performed a Death Valley Driver through a barbed wire board on Moxley for a near-fall. Janela performed an Elbow Drop off a ladder through a table on the floor on Moxley. Moxley performed a Snap Double Underhook DDT and a Death Valley Driver through a barbed wire board on Janela. Moxley performed a Rolling Release Suplex onto thumbtacks on Janela and threw Janela onto the thumbtacks. Moxley performed a Paradigm Shift on the thumbtacks on Janela to win. After the match, Kenny Omega appeared. Omega performed a V-Trigger and a Piledriver on a broken table on the floor on Moxley. Omega performed a Springboard Double Foot Stomp on the broken table on Moxley. On the stage, Omega struck Moxley with a guitar and a trash can. Omega performed a Snap Double Underhook DDT on the trash can on Moxley. Officials escorted Moxley out as the event ended.

== Reception ==
Around 4,200 tickets were sold for the show, with around 5,000 attendees. According to Dave Meltzer of the Wrestling Observer Newsletter, this number was "great for a company with no television [show], and above what house shows in markets that size are doing even by WWE." On America's BR Live, Fyter Fest recorded 350,000 unique viewers in total for the initial viewing, although the average number of BR Live viewers during the show itself was 140,000. Meltzer wrote that this was "considered a success" for BR Live. In non-American markets, there were around 14,000 internet pay-per-view buys via FITE TV, "very good" according to Meltzer.

Meltzer also wrote that Fyter Fest "got a generally favorable reaction". The Elite versus Laredo Kid and the Lucha Bros was the best rated match at 4.50 stars. Moxley-Janela, rated 4.25 stars, was "great for what it was": a match featuring "extreme shocking spots". The next highest rated matches were the pre-show tag team match and Cody-Darby Allin at 3.75 stars. The pre-show matches of Allie-Leva and Nakazawa-Jebailey received "most of the negativity", but Shawn Spears' chair shot to Cody also received fans' "outrage".

Much of the discussion after the event was due to the unprotected chair shot that Cody Rhodes took to his head from Shawn Spears following his match with Darby Allin, which necessitated the insertion of 12 surgical staples, with Jim Ross mentioning on-air about long-term health concerns for Rhodes. The Young Bucks claimed in an interview after the event that the chair was "gimmicked" in order to make the chair shot look unprotected (while remaining safe), but something went wrong, causing the head laceration. AEW received criticism by those in the industry for allowing the spot due to concerns of head trauma and CTE; by contrast, WWE legitimately banned chair shots to the head following the Chris Benoit double-murder and suicide.

== Aftermath ==
A few days after Fyter Fest, a rematch between The Elite (Kenny Omega, Matt Jackson, and Nick Jackson) and the Lucha Brothers (Pentagón Jr. and Rey Fénix) and Laredo Kid was confirmed for AAA's event, Triplemanía XXVII, on August 3, 2019.

Shawn Spears challenged Cody to a match at All Out that was made official.

Fyter Fest would continue as an annual summer event for AEW, but held as special episodes of AEW's television programs Dynamite (2020–present), Rampage (2022–present), and Collision (2023–present).

== Results ==
No.	Results	Stipulations	Times
1^{P}	Best Friends (Chuck Taylor and Trent Beretta) defeated SoCal Uncensored (Frankie Kazarian and Scorpio Sky) and Private Party (Isiah Kassidy and Marq Quen)	Three-way tag team match To advance to All Out for an opportunity at a first round bye in the AEW World Tag Team Championship tournament	16:00
2^{P}	Allie defeated Leva Bates (with Peter Avalon)	Singles match	8:50
3^{P}	Michael Nakazawa defeated Alex Jebailey	Hardcore match	9:30
4	Cima defeated Christopher Daniels	Singles match	9:40
5	Riho defeated Yuka Sakazaki and Nyla Rose	Three-way match	12:30
6	Adam Page defeated Jimmy Havoc, Jungle Boy (with Luchasaurus), and MJF	Four-way match	10:50
7	Cody (with Brandi Rhodes) vs. Darby Allin ended in a time limit draw	Singles match	20:00
8	The Elite (Kenny Omega, Matt Jackson and Nick Jackson) defeated Lucha Brothers (Pentagón Jr. and Rey Fénix) and Laredo Kid	Six-man tag team match	20:50
9	Jon Moxley defeated Joey Janela	Unsanctioned match	20:00
P / – the match was broadcast on the pre-show

== See also ==
- 2019 in professional wrestling
- List of All Elite Wrestling pay-per-view events
