= Fyter Fest (2020) =

All Elite Wrestling two-part television special

- Promotional poster featuring Jon Moxley and Brian Cage
- Promotion: All Elite Wrestling
- Date: July 1 and 2, 2020 (aired July 1 and 8, 2020)
- City: Jacksonville, Florida
- Venue: Daily's Place
- Attendance: 60 (behind closed doors) (Note: The event was held without a paying audience due to the ongoing pandemic. AEW invited Daily's Place and Jacksonville Jaguars sponsors to attend the event as an initial test of allowing spectators back. About sixty invited guests were admitted.)

Fyter Fest chronology
← Previous; 2019	Next → 2021

AEW Dynamite special episodes chronology
← Previous; Bash at the Beach	Next → Fight for the Fallen

The 2020 Fyter Fest was a two-part professional wrestling television special produced by All Elite Wrestling (AEW). It was the second annual Fyter Fest and took place on July 1 and 2, 2020, at Daily's Place in Jacksonville, Florida. The event aired on TNT as a two-part series of special episodes of AEW's weekly television program, Wednesday Night Dynamite. The first part aired live, while the second part was taped on July 2 and aired on tape delay on July 8.

The event was originally scheduled to air on pay-per-view from Wembley Arena in London, England in June and be AEW's United Kingdom debut, but had to change locations due to the COVID-19 pandemic. As with many of AEW's other programs since the pandemic began, the show was moved to Daily's Place in Jacksonville, Florida and split into a two-night event. AEW invited 60 sponsors from other corporate brands (Jacksonville Jaguars and Daily's Place) to attend the event in the upper deck as a test of allowing spectators that led to live spectators returning in August. This event subsequently began Fyter Fest's broadcast format as a multi-part television special of AEW's weekly programs as the inaugural 2019 event was a standalone special event.

The main event of night 1 saw Kenny Omega and Adam Page successfully defend the AEW World Tag Team Championship against Best Friends (Chuck Taylor and Trent). The main event of the second night was originally scheduled to be Jon Moxley defending the AEW World Championship against Brian Cage, but this match was postponed to the Fight for the Fallen event due to Moxley being exposed to COVID-19. Instead, the main event of night 2 saw Chris Jericho defeat Orange Cassidy.

== Production ==
Other on-screen personnel
Role	Name
Commentators	Jim Ross
Commentators	Excalibur
Commentators	Tony Schiavone
Commentators	Chris Jericho (Night 1)
Ring announcer	Justin Roberts
Referees	Aubrey Edwards
Referees	Mike Posey
Referees	Paul Turner
Referees	Rick Knox
Interviewers	Alex Marvez
Interviewers	Dasha Gonzalez

=== Background ===
On June 29, 2019, All Elite Wrestling (AEW) held a professional wrestling special event titled Fyter Fest. The show was a follow-up to the Community Effort Orlando (CEO) and New Japan Pro-Wrestling (NJPW) co-promoted CEO⨯NJPW: When Worlds Collide event, which was organized by then-NJPW wrestler Kenny Omega, who became an Executive Vice President and wrestler for AEW and was also key in organizing the first Fyter Fest. While AEW President and Chief Executive Officer Tony Khan had stated that there would be a second Fyter Fest event, it was not officially announced until May 2020's Double or Nothing, thus establishing Fyter Fest as an annual event for AEW, though this second event was produced by AEW alone and not in partnership with CEO like the previous year.

==== Impact of the COVID-19 pandemic ====
During the media scrum following Double or Nothing's broadcast, Tony Khan revealed that the 2020 Fyter Fest was initially scheduled to take place at Wembley Arena in London, England in June and be AEW's United Kingdom debut, but had to change locations due to the COVID-19 pandemic. On June 3, it was announced that instead of airing on pay-per-view like originally planned, the event would be broadcast as a two-part special of AEW's weekly television program Wednesday Night Dynamite on July 1 and 8. The first night aired live on July 1 while the second night was pre-recorded on July 2 and aired on tape delay on July 8. Both episodes were held behind closed doors at AEW's home venue of Daily's Place in Jacksonville, Florida, where AEW held the majority of their shows since the pandemic began in mid-March.

=== Storylines ===
Fyter Fest featured professional wrestling matches that involved different wrestlers from pre-existing scripted feuds and storylines. Storylines were produced on AEW's weekly television program, Dynamite, the supplementary online streaming show, Dark, and The Young Bucks' YouTube series Being The Elite.

At Double or Nothing on May 23, Cody defeated Lance Archer in the tournament final to be crowned the inaugural TNT Champion. On the following episode of Dynamite, Cody announced an open challenge in which he would defend the title every week. After defending the title against Marq Quen on the June 10 episode, Jake Hager attacked Cody, signaling that he wanted a shot at the title, which Cody granted him to occur at Fyter Fest.

During The Buy In pre-show of Double or Nothing, Best Friends (Chuck Taylor and Trent) defeated Private Party (Isiah Kassidy and Marq Quen) to earn a match for the AEW World Tag Team Championship. On the May 27 episode of Dynamite, it was announced that Best Friends would receive their title match against champions Kenny Omega and Adam Page at Fyter Fest.

After Best Friends (Chuck Taylor and Trent) and Orange Cassidy defeated The Inner Circle (Jake Hager, Santana and Ortiz) on the June 10 episode of Dynamite, Chris Jericho and his stable beat down Best Friends and bloodied Cassidy with blood oranges. Best Friends put their number one contendership for the AEW World Tag Team Championship on the line to get a match with Le Sex Gods (Chris Jericho and Sammy Guevara). On the June 17 episode, Best Friends defeated Le Sex Gods to retain their title opportunity after Cassidy, disguised as a ringside cameraman, tripped Guevara and allowed Trent to score the pinfall. After the conclusion of the match, Cassidy attacked Jericho, and a match between the two was also scheduled for Fyter Fest.

At Double or Nothing, Hikaru Shida defeated Nyla Rose in a No Disqualification and No Countout match to become the new AEW Women's World Champion. On the June 10 episode of Dynamite, Shida teamed with Kris Statlander against Rose and Penelope Ford. After Ford pinned Shida to win the tag team match, a title match between the two was scheduled for Fyter Fest.

==== Cancelled match ====
At Double or Nothing, the debuting Brian Cage won the nine-man Casino Ladder Match to earn a future AEW World Championship opportunity. During the media scrum following Double or Nothing's broadcast, Tony Khan announced that Cage's championship match against Jon Moxley, who successfully defended the title against Mr. Brodie Lee that night, would occur at Fyter Fest. However, during night one of Fyter Fest, it was announced that the match had been rescheduled to take place at Fight for The Fallen, due to Moxley being subject to secondary exposure to COVID-19 after his wife, Renee Young, tested positive for the virus.

== Reception ==
=== Television ratings ===
The first night of Fyter Fest averaged 782,000 television viewers on TNT and a 0.29 rating in AEW's key demographic. The second night of Fyter Fest drew 715,000 viewers, and drew a 0.28 rating in the key demographic.

== Results ==
Night 1 (July 1)
No.	Results	Stipulations	Times
1	Jurassic Express (Jungle Boy and Luchasaurus) (with Marko Stunt) defeated MJF and Wardlow	Tag team match	11:15
2	Hikaru Shida (c) defeated Penelope Ford (with Kip Sabian)	Singles match for the AEW Women's World Championship	11:28
3	Cody (c) (with Arn Anderson) defeated Jake Hager (with Catalina Hager)	Singles match for the AEW TNT Championship	14:59
4	Private Party (Isiah Kassidy and Marq Quen) (with Matt Hardy) defeated The Inner Circle (Santana and Ortiz)	Tag team match	11:23
5	Kenny Omega and Adam Page (c) defeated Best Friends (Chuck Taylor and Trent)	Tag team match for the AEW World Tag Team Championship	15:39
(c) / – the champion(s) heading into the match

Night 2 (July 8)
No.	Results	Stipulations	Times
1	Kenny Omega and Adam Page (c) defeated Private Party (Isiah Kassidy and Marq Quen) (with Matt Hardy)	Tag team match for the AEW World Tag Team Championship	11:32
2	Lance Archer (with Jake Roberts) defeated Joey Janela (with Sonny Kiss)	Singles match	11:17
3	The Butcher and The Blade and Lucha Brothers (Pentagón Jr. and Rey Fénix) defeated FTR (Cash Wheeler and Dax Harwood) and The Young Bucks (Matt Jackson and Nick Jackson)	Eight-man tag team match	16:27
4	Nyla Rose defeated Kenzie Paige and KiLynn King	Handicap match	2:11
5	Colt Cabana and The Dark Order (Brodie Lee and Stu Grayson) defeated SoCal Uncensored (Christopher Daniels, Frankie Kazarian, and Scorpio Sky)	Six-man tag team match	11:27
6	Chris Jericho (with Santana and Ortiz) defeated Orange Cassidy (with Best Friends)	Singles match	18:00
(c) / – the champion(s) heading into the match

== See also ==
- 2020 in professional wrestling
