= CEO×NJPW: When Worlds Collide =

2018 New Japan Pro-Wrestling event

- Promotional poster featuring Alex Jebailey and Kenny Omega
- Promotion: New Japan Pro-Wrestling
- Date: June 29, 2018
- City: Daytona Beach, Florida
- Venue: Ocean Center
- Tagline: When Worlds Collide!

Event chronology
← Previous; Kizuna Road 2018; Lion's Gate Project 13	Next → Strong Style Evolved UK

Community Effort Orlando Wrestling Event chronology
← Previous; First	Next → AEW Fyter Fest

CEO×NJPW: When Worlds Collide was a professional wrestling event promoted by New Japan Pro-Wrestling (NJPW) in co-sponsorship with Community Effort Orlando (CEO). The event took place on June 29, 2018, at the Ocean Center in Daytona Beach, Florida alongside the CEO fighting game event. The event aired for free on CEO Gaming's official Twitch channel.

The card comprised eight matches, including three on the pre-show. In the main event, the Golden☆Lovers (Kenny Omega and Kota Ibushi) defeated Los Ingobernables de Japón (Tetsuya Naito and Hiromu Takahashi) in a tag team match.

== Production ==
=== Background ===
On May 14, 2018, New Japan Pro-Wrestling (NJPW) announced a partnership with Community Effort Orlando (CEO) to produce a crossover professional wrestling show called CEO×NJPW: When Worlds Collide. The event was scheduled to be held on June 29, 2018, at the Ocean Center in Daytona Beach, Florida as part of CEO's fighting game event that year. This partnership came by way of NJPW wrestler Kenny Omega. The event card was officially announced on June 26.

=== Storylines ===
CEO×NJPW: When Worlds Collide comprised eight professional wrestling matches, including three on the pre-show, that involved different wrestlers from pre-existing scripted feuds and storylines. Wrestlers portrayed heroes, villains, or less distinguishable characters in scripted events that built tension and culminated in a wrestling match or series of matches.

== Aftermath ==
For CEO's 2019 fighting game event, the company partnered with All Elite Wrestling (AEW), which was founded earlier that year in January. Just like the 2018 event, this partnership came by way of Kenny Omega, who left NJPW in January 2019 and signed with AEW as an executive vice president and wrestler in February. This CEO event with AEW was called Fyter Fest, in which the name, logo, and slogan of the event parodied the fraudulent Fyre Festival. Fyter Fest has since continued as an annual event for AEW but without CEO.

== Controversy ==
The first pre-show match featured Florida wrestler and trainer Chasyn Rance, who is a registered sex offender after having been convicted of sexual activity with a minor. In response to fan questions as to why Rance was booked on the show, Kenny Omega released a statement stating that Rance was featured because the ring crew for the event were given "carte blanche" to put on a dark match featuring two of their members; Rance was one of the two chosen. In a second statement, he further apologised and offered refunds to anyone who could not enjoy the show because of Rance's presence.

== Results ==
No.	Results	Stipulations	Times
1^{P}	Chasyn Rance defeated Aaron Epic	Singles match	7:50
2^{P}	Michael Nakazawa defeated Skinny Boy	Singles match	1:12
3^{P}	Alex Jebailey defeated Michael Nakazawa	Singles match	4:02
4	Jyushin Thunder Liger defeated Rocky Romero	Singles match	10:41
5	Guerrillas of Destiny (Tama Tonga and Tanga Loa) defeated Juice Robinson and David Finlay	Tag team match	14:20
6	Jeff Cobb defeated Chase Owens	Singles match	12:51
7	Taguchi Japan (Ryusuke Taguchi and Dragon Lee) defeated Roppongi 3K (Sho and Yoh)	Tag team match	14:06
8	Golden☆Lovers (Kenny Omega and Kota Ibushi) defeated Los Ingobernables de Japón (Tetsuya Naito and Hiromu Takahashi)	Tag team match	21:54
P / – the match was broadcast on the pre-show

== See also ==
- 2018 in professional wrestling
