= Best Friends (professional wrestling) =

Professional wrestling tag team

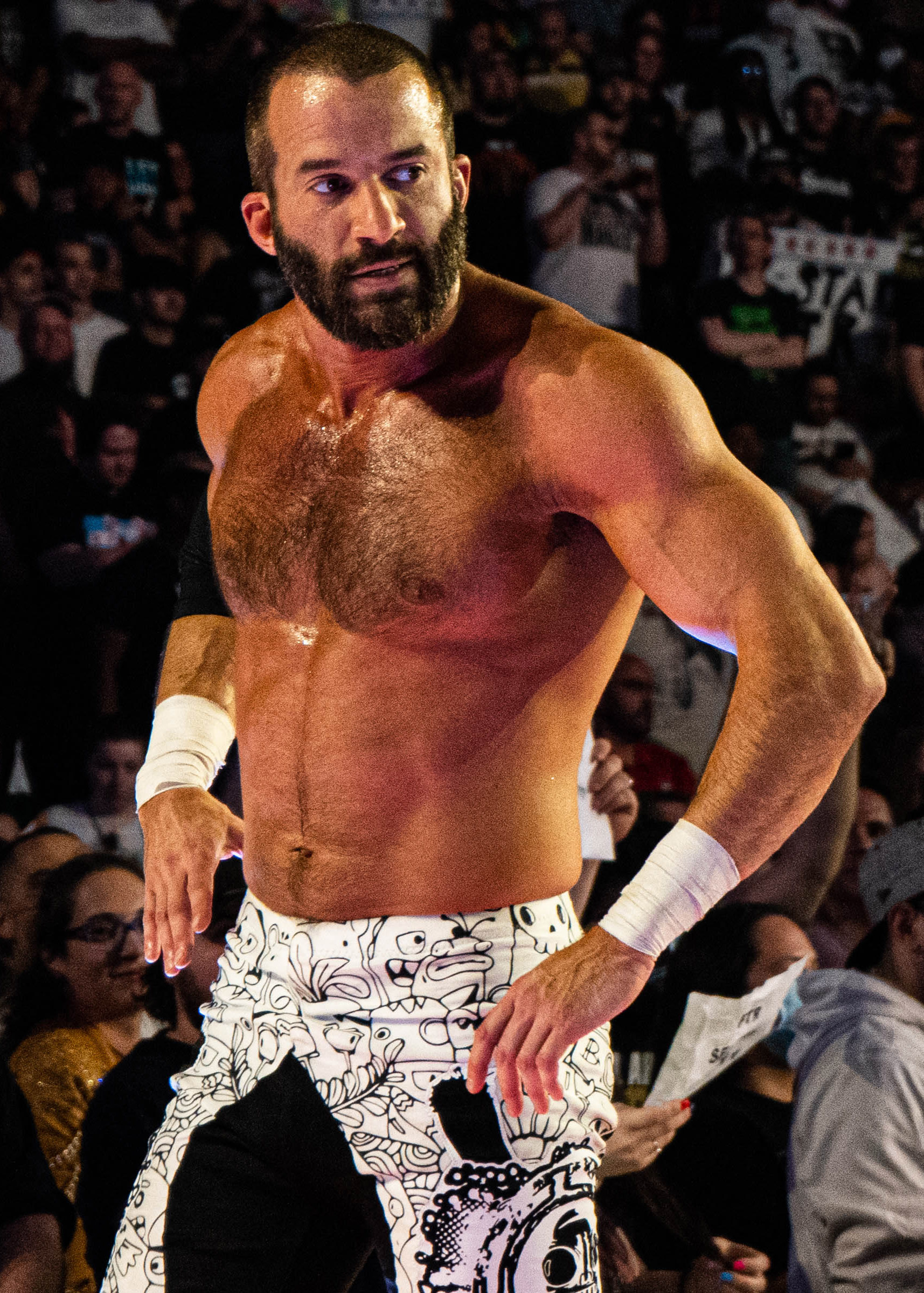
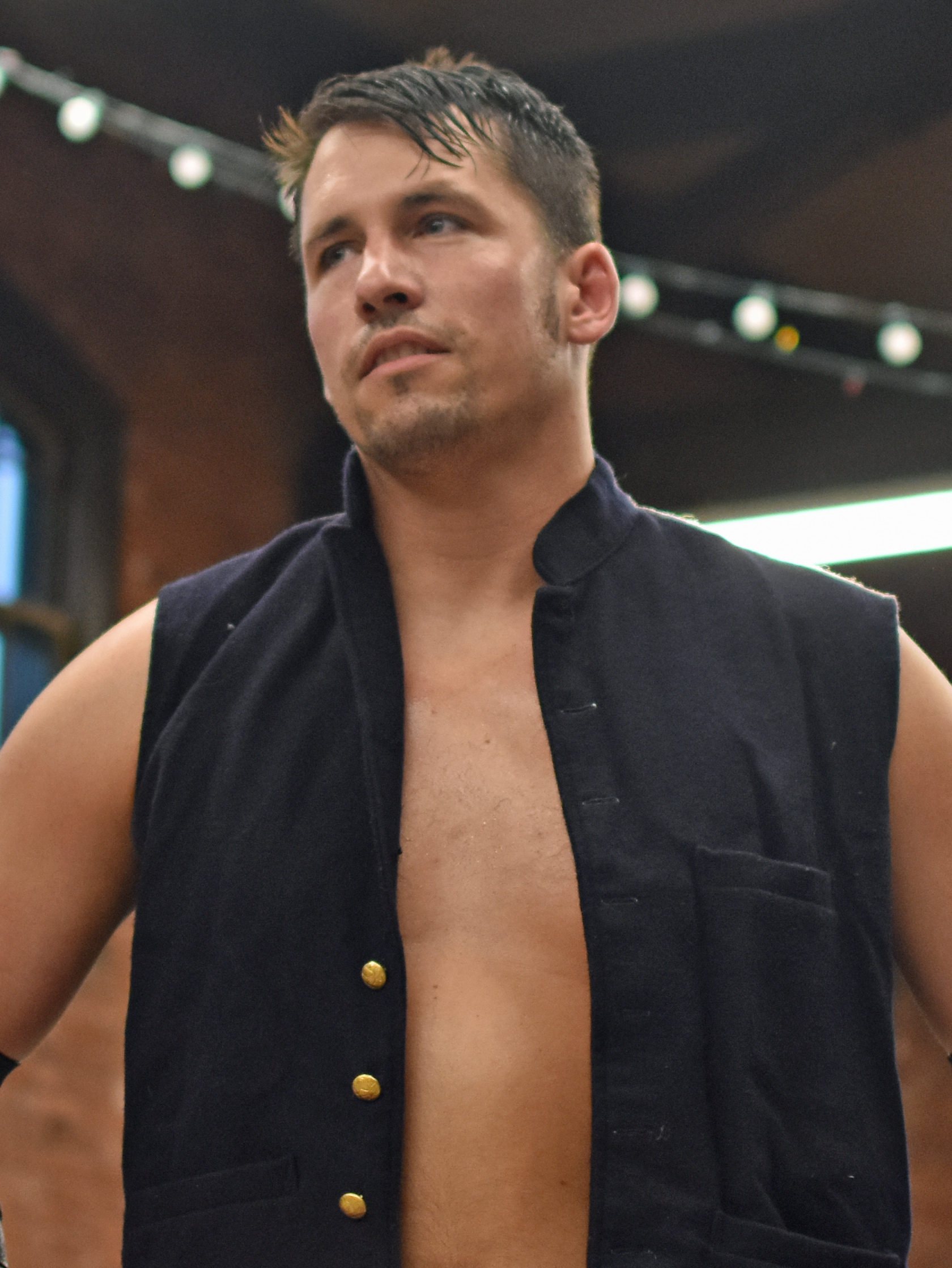
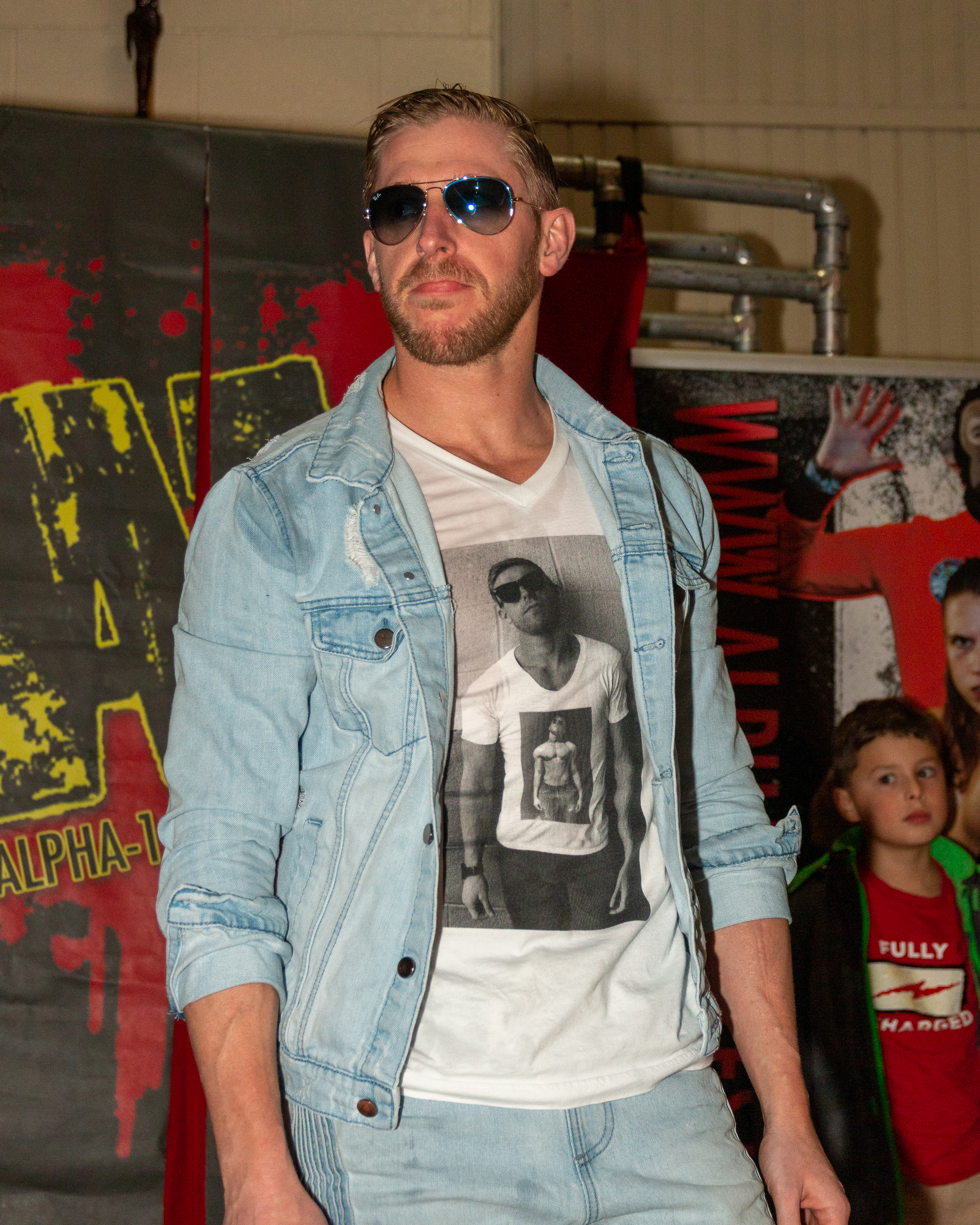
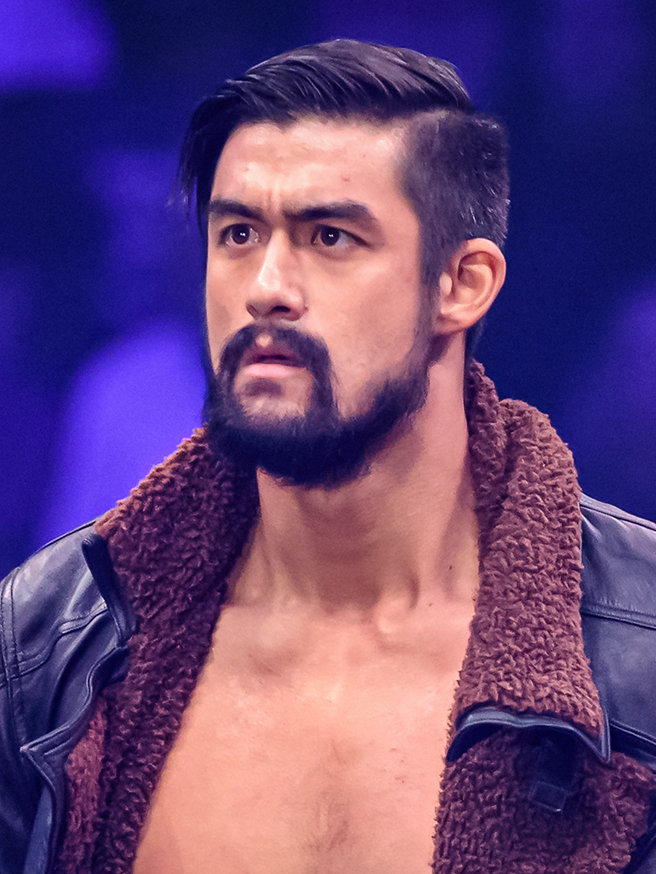
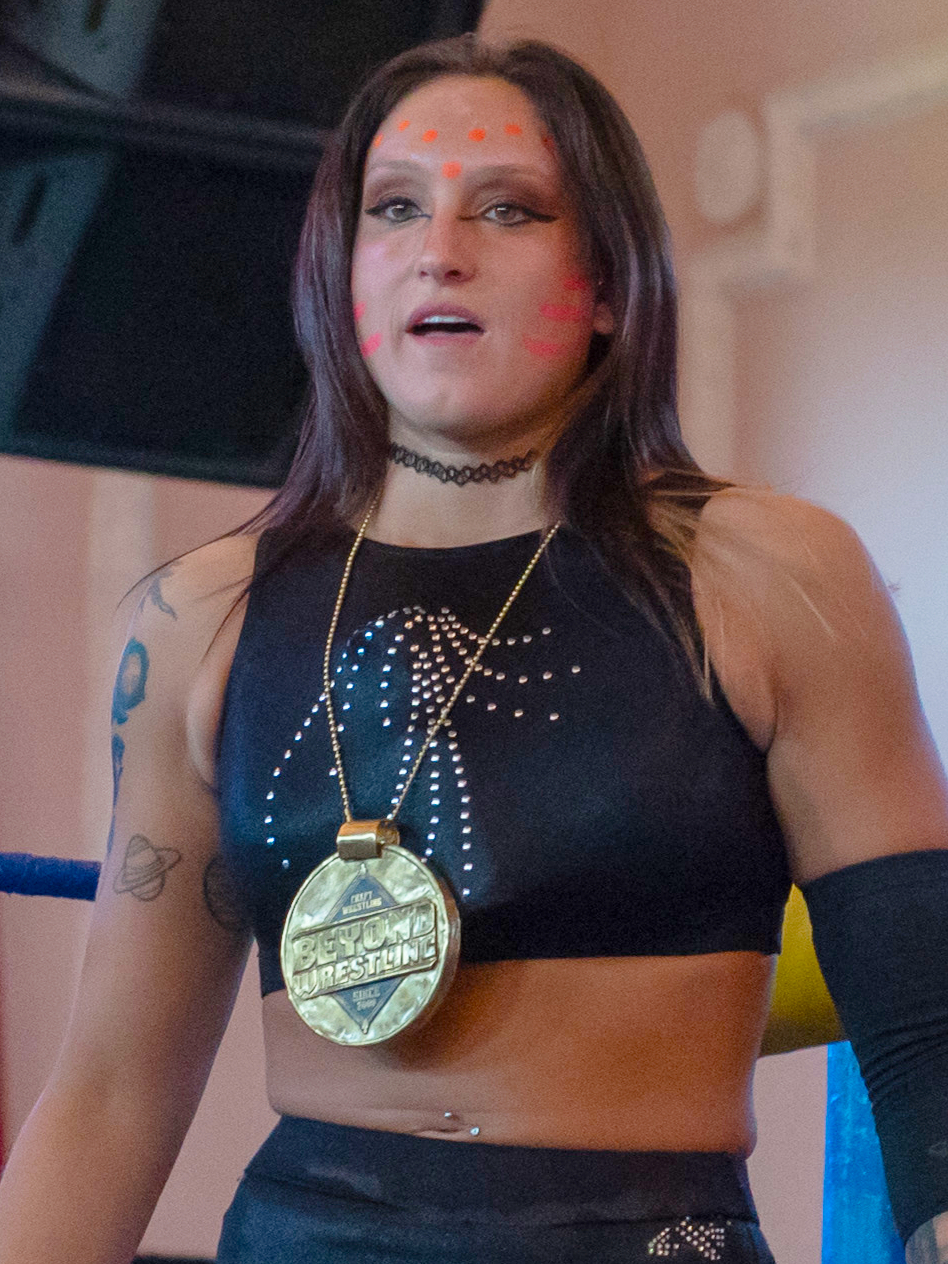
- Clockwise from top-left: Beretta, Taylor, Cassidy, Statlander, and Yuta

Stable
- Members: See below
- Name: Best Friends
- Debut: August 30, 2013
- Disbanded: May 29, 2024
- Years active: 2013–2024

Best Friends were an American professional wrestling stable in All Elite Wrestling (AEW). Originally a tag team consisting of Chuck Taylor and Trent Beretta, they first formed in Pro Wrestling Guerilla (PWG), where they were the winners of the 2014 Dynamite Duumvirate Tag Team Title Tournament.

Since the inception of AEW in 2019, the duo regularly appeared alongside Orange Cassidy. Starting in 2021, they would be joined by Kris Statlander and Wheeler Yuta, the latter of whom left the team in 2022. The group was the AEW branch of the NJPW faction Chaos, as the two organizations have a working relationship.

The original team of Taylor and Trent were often seen as a comedy tag team, with Trent often acting as the straight man to the more eccentric Taylor.

== History ==
=== Pro Wrestling Guerilla (2013–2019) ===
Chuck Taylor and Trent Beretta first teamed on August 31, 2013, at the Pro Wrestling Guerilla (PWG) 2013 Battle of Los Angeles, alongside Joey Ryan, where they defeated the team of B-Boy, Tommaso Ciampa, and Willie Mack. A string of victories followed, culminating in Taylor and Trent defeating The Inner City Machine Guns to win the 2014 Dynamite Duumvirate Tag Team Title Tournament on January 31. They subsequently lost a match against The Young Bucks for the PWG World Tag Team Championship at Mystery Vortex II on March 28, 2014.

=== Ring of Honor (2017–2019) ===
Best Friends first appeared in Ring of Honor (ROH) on May 14, 2017, joined by Beretta's Roppongi Vice partner Rocky Romero, in a victory over Bullet Club's The Young Bucks and Adam Page. On October 10, Chuckie T and Beretta won a match against The Addiction to become number one contenders to the ROH World Tag Team Championship, but lost to defending champions The Motor City Machine Guns at Final Battle on December 15.

=== New Japan Pro-Wrestling (2017–2019) ===
Best Friends made their debut for New Japan Pro-Wrestling (NJPW) on the second day of the 2017 World Tag League on November 19, representing the CHAOS stable. They went on to score four wins and three losses in the tournament, failing to advance to the finals. They competed in the 2018 World Tag League as well, scoring 14 points and thus failing to advance to the finals. During the tournament, Chuckie displayed a much more aggressive attitude, attacking his opponents with steel chairs which often caused a disqualification loss for the team and caused tension to build between him and Beretta.

Ultimately, this storyline never developed further, as they both left NJPW and signed with upstart All Elite Wrestling in the beginning of 2019. On February 7, 2019, their profiles were removed from NJPW website.

=== All Elite Wrestling (2019–2024) ===
==== Various feuds (2019–2024) ====
On February 7, 2019, Best Friends appeared at an All Elite Wrestling rally in Las Vegas and announced that they were joining AEW. At the inaugural All Out event, the duo competed against The Dark Order in a match to qualify for the AEW World Tag Team Title Tournament to crown the inaugural champions, but were defeated. After a post-match attack from The Dark Order, the duo were saved by Orange Cassidy, who aligned himself with Chuck and Trent. On the October 30, 2019, episode of Dynamite, Best Friends and Orange Cassidy made their trios debut in a winning effort against Alex Reynolds, John Silver, and Q. T. Marshall. At Bash at the Beach on January 15, 2020, Best Friends competed in a four-way tag team match to determine the number one contenders for the AEW World Tag Team Championship, which was won by "Hangman" Adam Page and Kenny Omega. At the 2020 Double or Nothing Buy-In, Best Friends defeated Private Party (Isiah Kassidy & Marq Quen) in a number one contender's match for the AEW World Tag Team Championship after delivering the Strong Zero on Quen.

On the June 10th edition of Dynamite, Best Friends and Orange Cassidy defeated The Inner Circle's Jake Hager and Santana and Ortiz in a 6-man tag team match, after which they suffered a beatdown from the rest of The Inner Circle, with Cassidy suffering the worst after Chris Jericho hit him with a bag of blood oranges. Best Friends would seek revenge against Jericho and Sammy Guevara (Le Sex Gods) while putting their tag team title #1 contendership on the line on the June 17th edition of Dynamite. They emerged victorious after Guevara tripped over the cameraman's hand which enabled Trent to pick up the victory for the team. The cameraman who was at ringside turned out to be Orange Cassidy who then proceeded to beat down Jericho. Best Friends would receive their tag team title shot against Kenny Omega and "Hangman" Adam Page at Fyter Fest night 1, which they lost. In late August, Cassidy resumed his feud with Chris Jericho, while Trent and Chuck began feuding with Santana and Ortiz, after Trent's mother Sue's van was destroyed by Santana and Ortiz. Cassidy defeated Jericho in a Mimosa Mayhem match at All Out on September 5, 2020. Chuck and Trent's feud with Santana and Ortiz culminated on the following episode of Dynamite where they emerged victorious in a Parking Lot Brawl with assistance from Cassidy. Across September and October, Cassidy challenged for the AEW TNT Championship on three occasions, but was unsuccessful. The first was on the September 23 episode of Dynamite where he lost to Mr. Brodie Lee, then on the October 14 episode he wrestled to a time-limit draw with Cody. On the same episode, Chuck and Trent unsuccessfully challenged FTR for the tag team titles. Cassidy would lose his rematch with Cody, due to interference from Cody's personal advisor Arn Anderson.

Heading into 2021, Best Friends entered a feud with Kip Sabian, Penelope Ford, and Miro, after Trent accidentally destroyed Sabian and Ford's arcade machine during a match. During the feud, Trent legitimately tore his pectoral muscle, sidelining him for months. On the January 13 episode of Dynamite, Chuck and Miro had a match with the stipulation that if Chuck lost, he had to serve as Miro's servant for a month. Chuck lost and was forced to wear a tuxedo and have his ring name changed to Charles Taylor. At Beach Break, Cassidy crashed Sabian and Ford's wedding, marking the end of Chuck's servant contract with Miro and reverting back to Chuck Taylor. On the March 31 episode of Dynamite, Chuck and Orange fought Miro and Sabian in an Arcade Anarchy match where if Chuck lost again, he would become Miro's servant permanently. Chuck and Orange were victorious with assistance from a returning Trent, and a new friend in the form of Kris Statlander, who took out Ford.

In April 2021, Trent would take time off to receive spinal fusion surgery. In May, Cassidy challenged for the AEW World Championship in a three-way match against the champion Kenny Omega and PAC at Double or Nothing, but was unsuccessful. On the May 24 episode of Dark: Elevation, the group saved Rocky Romero from a post match beatdown, effectively reuniting the team of Roppongi Vice, and incorporating Romero into Best Friends. In Trent's absence, the group recruited Wheeler Yuta, taking him under their wing as a young lion, seemingly without telling him. In July, Cassidy and Best Friends would get involved in a feud with Matt Hardy and his stable, the Hardy Family Office. Cassidy, Chuck, and Yuta defeated Private Party and Jora Johl in on an episode of Dark: Elevation, which was Yuta's first time teaming with the group. At All Out that year, Best Friends teamed up with Jurassic Express to defeat the Hardy Family Office in a 10-man tag team match. At the same event, Statlander, accompanied by Cassidy, unsuccessfully challenged Britt Baker for the AEW Women's World Championship. Best Friends prevailed in the majority of matches in the feud, however Cassidy lost to Hardy in a lumberjack match at the very end. Following that, Rocky Romero, on the behalf of Kazuchika Okada, offered the entire group a place in the NJPW stable CHAOS, to which they accepted. Best Friends would later immediately get into a feud with The Elite, who were strengthened by the arrivals of Adam Cole and Bobby Fish. After a number of defeats to The Elite, Trent would return from injury on the December 8 episode on Dynamite and saved Best Friends from a post-match beatdown. On the December 17 episode of Rampage, CHAOS (Chuck, Trent, Orange, and Rocky) defeated Bobby Fish and the Superkliq (Adam Cole and the Young Bucks) in an 8-man tag match. After months of the factions trading wins and losses, Cassidy faced Adam Cole in a lights out match at Beach Break. During the match, Danhausen would make his AEW debut and assist Cassidy, who would go on to win the match. In the weeks that followed, Danhausen would assist the Best Friends in their matches and eventually appear with the group regularly.

Friction began to form between Trent and Yuta throughout early 2022, with Trent antagonizing Yuta in backstage segments and supplementary material, feeling that his friends had replaced him with Wheeler during his absence. At the same time, Bryan Danielson, while floating the idea of a stable with Jon Moxley, made overtures towards Yuta by naming him as a potential understudy. On March 16, 2022, Yuta and Chuck lost a tag team match to Danielson and Moxley, now led and managed by William Regal, but after the match, a spurned Yuta would return to the ring and offer a handshake to Regal. Regal would instead slap him, causing Yuta to confront him immediately afterwards, impressing Regal. On the March 30 and April 8 episodes of Dynamite and Rampage respectively, Yuta would lose to the newly christened Blackpool Combat Club in increasingly competitive matches, with the latter match with Moxley finally resulting in Regal offering a bloodied Yuta a handshake, which he accepted, before painting "BCC" on his chest with his blood, signifying his departure from Best Friends and CHAOS and initiation into the Blackpool Combat Club.

In August 2022, Statlander suffered a completely torn ACL and lateral meniscus in her right leg during a match on Dark and stated she would need to take time off to recover amount of time to recover. On the August 17 episode of Dynamite, Best Friends and Orange Cassidy defeated The Trustbusters (Ari Daivari, Parker Boudreaux, and Slim J) in the first round of the AEW World Trios Title Tournament to crown the inaugural AEW World Trios Champions. They went out in the semi-finals to "Hangman" Adam Page and the Dark Order on the September 2 episode of Rampage. Shortly afterwards at the All Out event, Cassidy confronted longtime rival PAC, challenging him for the AEW All-Atlantic Championship. On the Dynamite after All Out, Best Friends would face Death Triangle for the World Trios Championship after the titles had been vacated, but were unsuccessful. Cassidy and PAC faced each other for the All-Atlantic Championship at Grand Slam, but Cassidy lost after PAC cheated and hit him with a hammer. Trent would then challenge PAC for his title at Battle of the Belts IV, but PAC cheated once again and used a hammer to get the win over Trent and retain his title. After the match Cassidy arrived and saved Trent from a post-match beatdown. Cassidy would then receive a rematch against PAC on the October 12 episode of Dynamite. With help from Danhausen who stopped PAC from using the hammer again, Cassidy defeated his longtime rival and won his first championship in AEW, celebrating with Best Friends after the match. The following week, Best Friends challenged Death Triangle again for the trios titles, but were unsuccessful.

In 2023, Best Friends entered a short-lived feud with the House of Black. On the April 5 episode of Dynamite, HOB defeated Best Friends in a championship match for the trios titles. On the following week's Dynamite, Cassidy defeated Buddy Matthews to retain the International Championship (renamed from the All-Atlantic Championship). On May 10, Best Friends once again unsuccessfully challenged House of Black for the trios titles, this time teaming with Bandido instead of Cassidy. The following week, Best Friends with Bandido, lost a trios match to the Blackpool Combat Club. This would mark the start of a rivalry between Best Friends and the BCC. On the June 6 edition of Dynamite, the BCC defeated CHAOS (Chuck, Trent, and Rocky). In the middle of this, Chuck and Trent participated in a four-way match for the ROH World Tag Team Championship at Death Before Dishonor, but were unsuccessful. They resumed their program with the BCC on July 26, as both teams lost a three-way match to the Lucha Brothers. On the August 3 episode of Rampage, Jon Moxley and Claudio Castagnoli defeated Chuck and Trent in a Parking Lot Fight, brutalizing Orange Cassidy with the help of former Best Friends member Wheeler Yuta, and destroyed Sue's van in the process. On the August 16 episode of Dynamite, Orange defeated Yuta in another title defense for the International Championship. After the match, Moxley, Claudio, and Yuta attacked Cassidy, who was saved by Chuck, Trent, the Lucha Brothers, and Eddie Kingston. Kingston then challenged the BCC to a Stadium Stampede match at All In London. At the event, Best Friends (Chuck, Trent, and Orange) emerged victorious alongside Kingston and Penta El Zero Miedo.

==== Disbandment (2024) ====
On the April 3, 2024 edition of Dynamite, Trent left the group by attacking Orange Cassidy after losing a tag match. This led to two matches between Cassidy and Trent, one on the May 8 episode Dynamite and on May 26 at Double or Nothing, both were won by Cassidy. Also at Double or Nothing, Statlander left the group after turning on Willow Nightingale and siding with Stokely Hathaway, this left Cassidy as the sole member and effectively disbanding the group on the following episode of Dynamite.

== Members ==
*	Founding member(s)

Member		Joined	Left
Chuck Taylor	*	August 31, 2013	April 24, 2024
Trent Beretta	*	August 31, 2013	April 3, 2024
Orange Cassidy		August 31, 2019	May 29, 2024
Kris Statlander		March 25, 2021	May 26, 2024
Wheeler Yuta		July 7, 2021	April 6, 2022

== Sub-groups ==
=== Former ===
Affiliate	Members	Tenure	Type	Promotion(s)
Chaos	Chuck Taylor; Trent Beretta; Orange Cassidy; Rocky Romero	2017–2019 (Note: Taylor and Beretta were originally members of CHAOS until they left NJPW in 2019. They re-joined the stable in 2021, with Cassidy, Statlander, and Yuta joining them.); 2021–2024	Stable	AEW; NJPW

== Championships and accomplishments ==
- All Elite Wrestling
  - AEW International Championship (2 times) – Cassidy (Note: During Cassidy's first reign, he won the title as the AEW All-Atlantic Championship. The title was renamed on March 15, 2023.)
  - AEW TBS Championship (1 time) – Statlander
  - 2023 Casino Tag Team Royale – Cassidy and Danhausen
  - Dynamite Award (1 time)
    - Hardest Moment to Clean Up After (2021) – (Best Friends vs Santana and Ortiz) – Dynamite (September 16)
- Pro Wrestling Guerrilla
  - Dynamite Duumvirate Tag Team Title Tournament (2014) – Trent and Taylor
- Pro Wrestling Illustrated
  - Most Popular Wrestler of the Year (2020) – Cassidy
- DDT Pro-Wrestling
  - Ironman Heavymetalweight Championship (1 time) – Cassidy
- Revolution Eastern Wrestling
  - REW 24/7 Championship (1 time) – Cassidy
- Wrestling Observer Newsletter
  - Best Gimmick (2020) – Cassidy
- Ring of Honor
  - ROH Pure Championship (1 time) – Yuta

== See also ==
- Roppongi Vice
