= Alex Abrahantes =

American professional wrestler signed to All Elite Wrestling

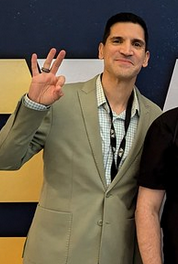
- Abrahantes in 2024

Personal information
- Born: November 9, 1977 (age 48) Secaucus, New Jersey, U.S.

Professional wrestling career
- Ring name(s): Alex Abrahantes; Yutzak Arafat
- Billed height: 5 ft 10 in (178 cm)
- Billed weight: 180 lb (82 kg)
- Trained by: Bruce Hart and Keith Hart
- Debut: December 6, 1996

Alex Abrahantes (born November 9, 1977) is an American professional wrestler and manager. He is best known for his time in All Elite Wrestling (AEW). For over 20 years, Abrahantes has worked in the professional wrestling industry.

== Early life ==
Abrahantes was born in Secaucus, New Jersey. He grew up in North Plainfield, New Jersey and participated in the performing arts program at Somerset County Vocational and Technical High School. He attended Pennsylvania State University, where he earned a Bachelor of Arts in communication. He is an alumnus of Skills USA, where he held a national officer positions.

== Entertainment career ==
Abrahantes has worked on several television and film projects throughout his career. He is best known for appearing in One Life to Live as a bartender. He is currently a guest host for QVC.

== Professional wrestling career ==
=== Early career ===
Abrahantes was trained in at the Hart Dungeon Wrestling School in Calgary, Alberta. He made his in-ring debut on December 6, 1996, in University Park, Pennsylvania. After wrestling on the independent circuit for several years, Abrahantes landed a job as the youngest member of the creative team at the WWE. From there, he went on to become a producer and web content developer for TNA. Abrahantes also produced the Spanish Announce team as well as ran TNA University, which later became known as TNAtion. He was also the head writer for Masked Warriors on MTV2. He was also the Vice President of Lucha Libre USA.

=== All Elite Wrestling (2019–2026) ===
In 2019, Abrahantes was hired by the new All Elite Wrestling promotion as an on-air host and a member of the Spanish language broadcast team. In 2021, Abrahantes' role was expanded as he became the manager for the Lucha Brothers tag team of Penta Oscuro and Rey Fenix. Abrahantes was ringside at the 2021 AEW All Out pay-per-view event where the Lucha Brothers defeated the Young Bucks for their first reign as the AEW World Tag Team Champions. Abrahantes also managed Komander in AEW. In January 2026, it was reported that Abrahantes' AEW contract had expired and was not renewed, ending his seven-year tenure with the promotion.
