= Britt Baker =

American professional wrestler (born 1991)

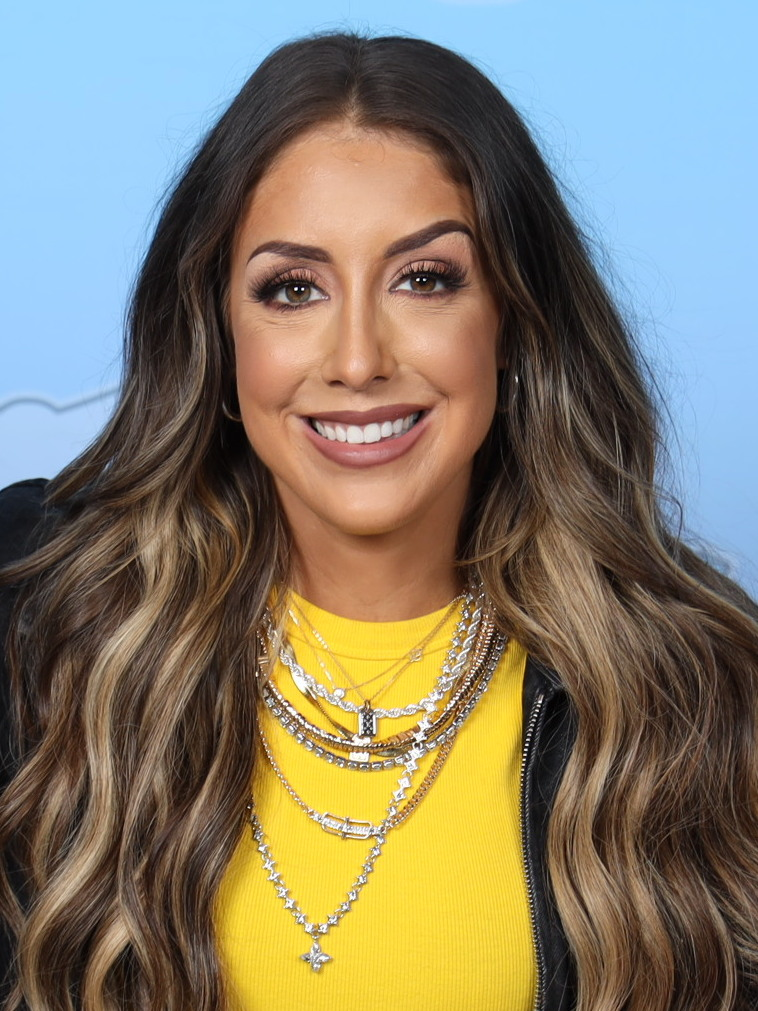
- Baker in 2023

Personal information
- Born: Brittany Ann Baker; April 23, 1991 (age 35) Punxsutawney, Pennsylvania, U.S.
- Education: Pennsylvania State University; University of Pittsburgh School of Dental Medicine

Professional wrestling career
- Ring name(s): Dr. Britt Baker, D.M.D. Britt Baker
- Billed height: 5 ft 7 in (170 cm)
- Billed from: Pittsburgh, Pennsylvania
- Trained by: Marshall Gambino; Super Hentai; Candice LeRae; Johnny Gargano
- Debut: August 2015

Brittany Ann Baker (born April 23, 1991) is an American professional wrestler and dentist. She is signed to All Elite Wrestling, where she performs under the ring name Dr. Britt Baker, D.M.D. and serves as the on-screen manager of Persephone while also being an active in-ring wrestler. She is also the first female wrestler signed to AEW.

== Early life ==
Brittany Ann Baker was born in Punxsutawney, Pennsylvania on April 23, 1991 to elementary school teacher Mary Ann and healthcare executive Sam Baker. She has a younger brother named Dane. She had an athletic childhood, participating in basketball and track and field. She studied behavioral medicine with a minor in human development and family studies at Pennsylvania State University, graduating in 2013. In 2014, the same year she began training as a professional wrestler, she enrolled in the University of Pittsburgh School of Dental Medicine and graduated in May 2018.

== Professional wrestling career ==
=== Early career (2015–2019) ===
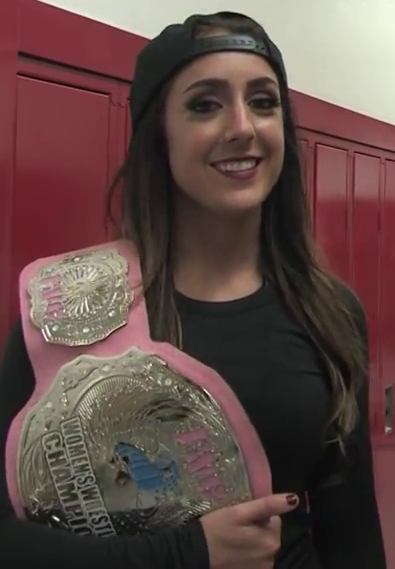
Baker in 2017

Baker began training as a professional wrestler in June 2014 when she enrolled at the International Wrestling Cartel (IWC) training academy in South Hills, Pennsylvania, training under the tutelage of Super Hentai and Marshall Gambino. She also trained under Johnny Gargano and Candice LeRae at Absolute Intense Wrestling in Cleveland, Ohio. She made her debut at an IWC event in August 2015. She appeared on WWE Raw as a jobber in 2016, losing to Nia Jax in a squash match. On December 10, 2016, she became the inaugural IWC Women's Champion when she defeated April Sera, Marti Belle, and Sonya Strong in a four-way elimination match. She was defeated by LuFisto for the title in July 2017.

On September 1, 2018, Baker competed in a four corner survival match against Madison Rayne, Chelsea Green, and Tessa Blanchard at the All In pay-per-view event, which was won by Blanchard. She regained the IWC Women's Championship by defeating LuFisto and Ray Lyn in a three-way match in October, only to drop it again in November to Katie Arquette., Baker would also make appearances in Ring of Honor, between 2016 to 2019.

=== All Elite Wrestling (2019–present) ===
==== Early feuds and AEW Women's World Champion (2019–2022) ====
On January 2, 2019, it was reported that Baker would sign with newfound promotion All Elite Wrestling (AEW), officially signing the following January 8 as the company's first contracted female wrestler. She made her debut for AEW on May 25 at its inaugural pay-per-view, Double or Nothing, where she defeated Nyla Rose, Kylie Rae, and Awesome Kong in a four-way match. On July 13, she competed in a tag team match alongside Riho at Fight for the Fallen, where the two were defeated by Bea Priestley and Shoko Nakajima. Baker suffered a legitimate concussion due to a kick by Priestley during the match, which incited a storyline rivalry between the two. On August 31, Baker competed in the Women's Casino Battle Royale for an opportunity at the AEW Women's World Championship at the All Out pre-show, during which she eliminated Shazza McKenzie, ODB, Brandi Rhodes, Mercedes Martinez, and Priestley before she herself was eliminated by Nyla Rose. Baker went on to defeat Priestley in a singles competition at the Full Gear pre-show on November 9.

At Chris Jericho's Rock 'N' Wrestling Rager at Sea Part Deux: Second Wave, which aired on Dynamite on January 22, 2020, Baker turned heel after she berated commentator Tony Schiavone following her victory over Priscilla Kelly. In May, Baker injured her leg during a tag team match, in which she and Rose went on to defeat Hikaru Shida and Kris Statlander, later stating that she would return in a wrestling role in September at All Out. Baker then began a rivalry with Big Swole, which involved Swole abducting her and tossing her into a dumpster during an episode of Dynamite. In July, she underwent surgery on her nose to repair a deviated septum. At All Out, Baker lost to Big Swole in a Tooth and Nail match, which was taped at her dental office. In November 2020, Baker began a feud with Thunder Rosa. The two competed against each other at Beach Break in February 2021, where Baker was victorious. That same month, she participated in the AEW Women's World Championship Eliminator Tournament as part of the U.S. bracket, defeating Madi Wrenkowski in the first round but losing to Nyla Rose in the semifinals. The feud concluded on the March 17 episode of Dynamite in the program's first main event to feature women, during which Rosa defeated Baker in an unsanctioned Lights Out match. The match received praise from critics.

At Double or Nothing on May 30, Baker defeated Shida to win the AEW Women's World Championship for the first time. On the premiere episode of Rampage on August 13, Baker held on to the title by defeating Red Velvet, after which she introduced Jamie Hayter as her ally. Baker successfully defended her title for the fifth time when she defeated Tay Conti at Full Gear. At Revolution in March 2022, Baker debuted a new AEW Women's World Championship belt and retained the title over Thunder Rosa. On Dynamite later that month, Baker lost the AEW Women's World Championship to Rosa in a steel cage match.

==== Various feuds and hiatuses (2022–present) ====
Baker participated in the 2022 Owen Hart Foundation Tournament, winning over Maki Itoh in the first round and advancing to the finals by defeating Toni Storm in the semifinal round. At Double or Nothing in May, she defeated Ruby Soho to become the tournament's inaugural female winner. At Revolution in March 2023, she began a feud with Soho, Saraya, and Toni Storm when the trio attacked her and Jamie Hayter after Hayter successfully retained the AEW Women's Championship, turning face for the first time since 2020. On the July 5 episode of Dynamite, she competed in the Owen Hart Foundation Women's Tournament, losing to Soho in the quarterfinals. She later competed for the AEW Women's title in four way matches at All In London and on the September 13 episode of Dynamite. Following an unsuccessful challenge for the TBS Championship on the September 16 episode of Collision, she took a step back from performing due to a back injury, but later gave extra reasons for her absence: "I listen [to the fans]. A lot of them said, 'We want less Britt Baker.' So, if that's what they want, that's what they'll get. Let me take a step back, here are the rest of the women."

At Forbidden Door on June 30, 2024, Baker made her return after more than nine months by interrupting the TBS and newly crowned Strong Women's Champion Mercedes Moné. On the following episode of Dynamite, she stated that she had initially been sidelined by two herniated disks and a torn hip labrum, before suffering a mini-stroke in November that further sidelined her for the first half of 2024. She would then be interrupted by Moné, whom she would challenge to a match on August 25 at All In, On July 24 at Blood & Guts, she defeated Hikaru Shida in her first match since October 2023. After the match, she would be interrupted once again by Moné and attacked by a debuting Kamille. Following a brawl during AEW's panel at Comic-Con the next day, AEW president Tony Khan announced that Baker would challenge Moné for the TBS Championship at All In. On August 2, it was reported that she had been suspended after a legitimate backstage altercation with MJF and his girlfriend Alicia Atout. On August 25 at All In, she was defeated by Moné.

Baker returned after nearly a two-year hiatus on August 30, 2026 at All In, where she turned heel and assisted Persephone in defeating Maya World for the TBS Championship. Following All In, Baker remained aligned with Persephone. On September 9 at the Rebel Heart special episode of Dynamite, Baker wrestled her first match in nearly two years, teaming with Persephone and Hikaru Shida to defeat World, Hyan, and Thunder Rosa after assistance from Rebel who was battling ALS.

== Professional wrestling style and persona ==
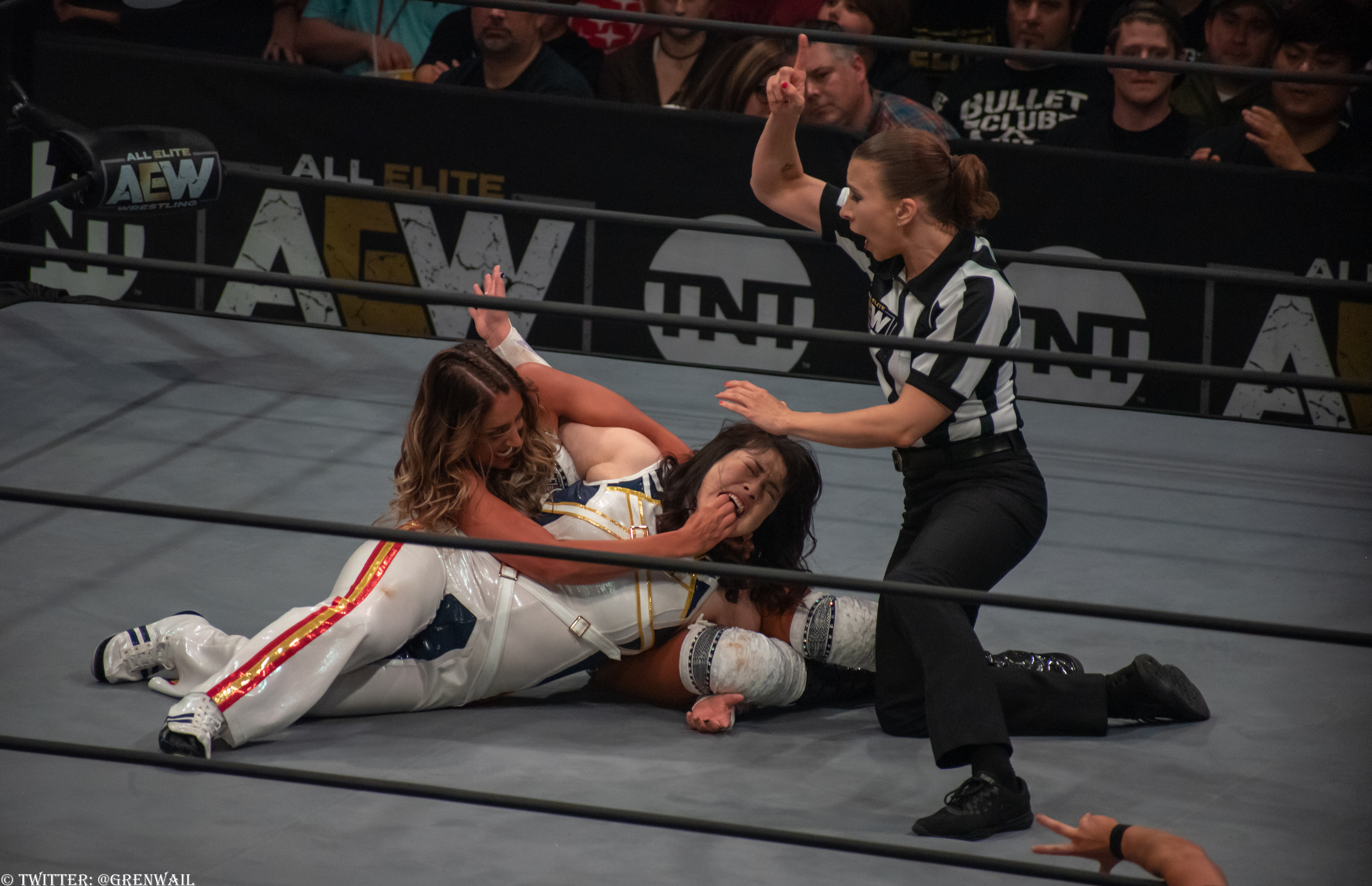
Baker performing her finishing maneuver, Lockjaw

Baker's legitimate profession as a dentist is often referenced as part of her character in AEW, so much so that Pro Wrestling Torch observed that "it became a parody". The character was originally described as "happy", but following her heel turn, has been described as "too proud" and "delusional", referring to herself as a "role model". Using the name "Dr. Britt Baker, D.M.D." in AEW, Baker says she intentionally incorporated "Dr." and "D.M.D." despite the tautology of employing both to enhance "her character's obnoxiousness". Her finisher is a scissored armbar mandible claw called Lockjaw. She associates with commentator Tony Schiavone, whom she calls one of her best friends, and fellow wrestler Rebel, who accompanies her in matches. She named Bayley and Mercedes Moné as among her inspirations in wrestling.

== Other media ==
Baker appeared as a main cast member for AEW All Access. She made her video game debut as a playable character in AEW Fight Forever.

Baker, alongside Adam Cole, appeared on the May 8, 2022 episode "Working to Death" of the American reality series Bar Rescue. She also had a guest role in the sixth season of Cobra Kai. Baker appeared as Debbie Nichols in the 2024 Mildred Burke biopic Queen of the Ring.

== Personal life ==
Baker dated fellow professional wrestler Adam Cole from 2017 to 2024, having met through the dating app Bumble. They remain friends.

Baker is a member of the American Dental Association and is employed as a dentist at a private practice in Winter Park, Florida, with whom she has an agreement for it to remain closed on Wednesdays to allow her to travel for AEW Dynamite. She said in 2018 that dentistry was her "forever dream job" and that she intended to continue practicing it during and after her wrestling career. In February 2026, Baker stated that she was no longer a full-time dentist due to receiving death threats from wrestling fans.

== Championships and accomplishments ==
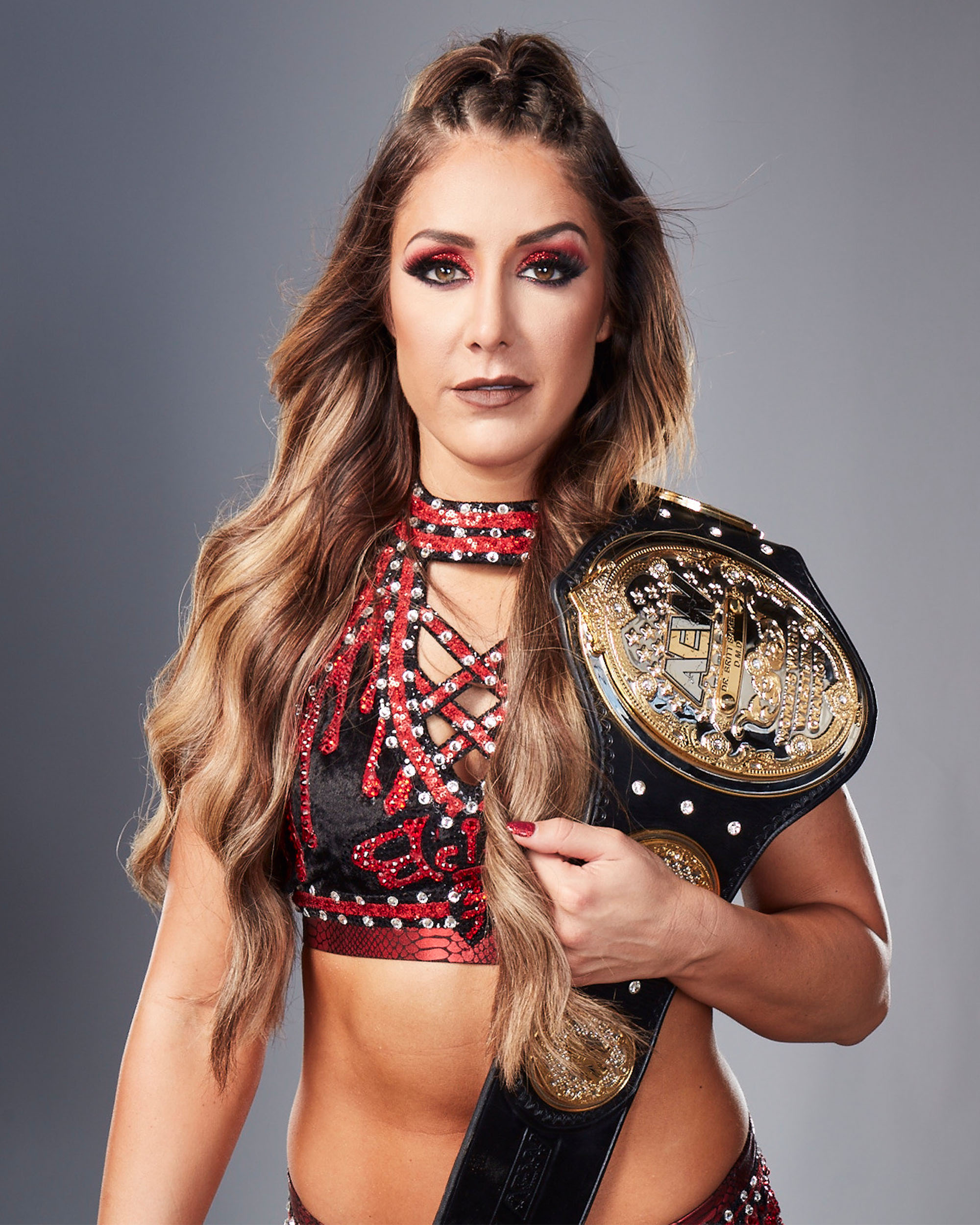
Baker is a former AEW Women's World Champion.

- All Elite Wrestling
  - AEW Women's World Championship (1 time)
  - Women's Owen Hart Cup (2022)
  - Dynamite Award (1 time)
    - Best AEW Fashion Moment (2022) – D.M.D.'s Brittsburgh Jacket
- DDT Pro-Wrestling
  - Ironman Heavymetalweight Championship (1 time)
- International Wrestling Cartel
  - IWC Women's Championship (2 times)
- Monster Factory
  - MFPW Girls Championship (1 time)
- Pro Wrestling Illustrated
  - Woman of the Year (2021)
  - Match of the Year (2021) – vs. Thunder Rosa (March 17)
  - Most Improved Wrestler of the Year (2021)
  - Ranked No. 4 of the top 150 female wrestlers in the PWI Women's 150 in 2021
- Remix Pro Wrestling
  - Remix Pro Fury Championship (1 time)
- REW - Revolution Eastern Wrestling
  - REW Pakistan Championship (1 time)
- Sports Illustrated
  - Ranked No. 7 of the top 10 wrestlers in 2021
- WrestleCircus
  - WC Big Top Tag Team Championship (1 time) – with Adam Cole
- Wrestling Observer Newsletter
  - Most Improved (2020)
- Zelo Pro Wrestling
  - Zelo Pro Women's Championship (1 time)
