= Fight for the Fallen (2021) =

All Elite Wrestling television special

- Promotional poster featuring various AEW wrestlers
- Promotion: All Elite Wrestling
- Date: July 28, 2021
- City: Charlotte, North Carolina
- Venue: Bojangles Coliseum
- Attendance: 7,000

Fight for the Fallen chronology
← Previous; 2020	Next → 2022

AEW Dynamite special episodes chronology
← Previous; Fyter Fest	Next → Homecoming

The 2021 Fight for the Fallen was a professional wrestling television special produced by All Elite Wrestling (AEW). It was the third annual Fight for the Fallen charity event and took place on July 28, 2021, at the Bojangles Coliseum in Charlotte, North Carolina as a special episode of Wednesday Night Dynamite on TNT in the United States. For the event's charitable cause, it helped support victims of domestic violence and sexual assault survivors. It was also the third and last event in AEW's "Welcome Back" tour, which celebrated AEW's resumption of live touring during the COVID-19 pandemic.

Six matches were contested at the event. In the main event, Chris Jericho defeated Nick Gage in a No Rules match. In other prominent matches, Lance Archer retained the IWGP United States Heavyweight Championship against Hikuleo, and The Elite (Kenny Omega, Matt Jackson, and Nick Jackson), and The Good Brothers (Doc Gallows and Karl Anderson) defeated Adam Page and The Dark Order (Evil Uno, Stu Grayson, John Silver, and Alex Reynolds) in a 10-man tag team elimination match, preventing Page and The Dark Order from challenging for the AEW World Championship and AEW World Tag Team Championship, respectively.

== Production ==
=== Background ===
Fight for the Fallen is a professional wrestling charity event held annually in July by All Elite Wrestling (AEW) since 2019. For the 2021 event's charitable cause, which was the third Fight for the Fallen event, AEW partnered with Safe Alliance, a non-profit organization dedicated to providing hope and healing for domestic violence and sexual assault survivors. In addition to AEW donating US$100,000 to Safe Alliance, a percentage of proceeds from the limited-edition Fight for the Fallen T-shirts were also donated.

Due to the COVID-19 pandemic that began effecting the industry in mid-March 2020, AEW held the majority of their programs from Daily's Place in Jacksonville, Florida; these events were originally held without fans, but the company began running shows at 10–15% capacity in August, before eventually running full capacity shows in May 2021. Also in May, AEW announced that they would be returning to live touring, beginning with a special episode of Dynamite titled Road Rager on July 7, which kicked off the "Welcome Back" tour. Fight for the Fallen was scheduled as the third and last event of the "Welcome Back" tour and like the 2020 event, it was held as a special episode of Dynamite. It took place on July 28, 2021, in Charlotte, North Carolina at the Bojangles Coliseum.

=== Storylines ===
Fight for the Fallen featured professional wrestling matches that involved different wrestlers from pre-existing scripted feuds and storylines, written by AEW's writers. Storylines were produced on AEW's weekly television program, Dynamite, the supplementary online streaming shows, Dark and Elevation, and The Young Bucks' YouTube series Being The Elite.

== Event ==
Other on-screen personnel
Role	Name
Commentators	Jim Ross
Commentators	Excalibur
Commentators	Tony Schiavone
Commentators	Don Callis (10-man elimination match)
Commentators	MJF (Chris Jericho vs. Nick Gage)
Ring announcer	Justin Roberts
Referees	Aubrey Edwards
Referees	Bryce Remsburg
Referees	Paul Turner
Referees	Rick Knox
Interviewer	Alex Marvez

=== Preliminary matches and segments ===
The event opened with The Elite (Kenny Omega, Matt Jackson, Nick Jackson, Doc Gallows and Karl Anderson) taking on Adam Page, Evil Uno, Stu Grayson, John Silver and Alex Reynolds in a 10-man tag team elimination match. Kenny Omega and The Elite entered in basketball jerseys, as the "Elite Squad", to "Get Ready for This" in reference to Space Jam to promote Space Jam: A New Legacy starring LeBron James, Jeff Bergman, Eric Bauza and Zendaya Coleman. Since The Elite won, Adam Page could not challenge for the AEW World Championship. According to Being The Elite, the special entrance was a gift to Nick Jackson, who celebrated his birthday the day of the show.

After the opening match, Taz held a championship celebration for Ricky Starks, with a band playing live music. The celebration was interrupted by Brian Cage.

Next, FTR faced Santana and Ortiz. The match had to finish early after Cash Wheeler suffered an injury.

After that, Tony Schiavone announced AEW Rampage: The First Dance, to be held at the United Center in Chicago, Illinois on Friday, August 20; sparking rumors of an appearance by CM Punk.

Later, Hikuleo (accompanied by King Haku) faced Lance Archer for the IWGP United States Heavyweight Championship. Archer retained, after which Hiroshi Tanahashi challenged him to a championship match at NJPW Resurgence.

Cody Rhodes was interviewed before being attacked by Malakai Black. The fight went on from the backstage area into the stage in front of the crowd, until Black knocked Rhodes out on the entrance ramp and several wrestlers and officials ran out to Rhodes' aid.

In the fourth match, Christian Cage and Jurassic Express (Jungle Boy and Luchasaurus) beat the Hardy Family Office (Angelico and Private Party), accompanied by Matt Hardy. After the match, Christian was attacked by The Blade.

In the penultimate match, Thunder Rosa beat Julia Hart, in her first match after officially signing with AEW.

=== Main event ===
In the main event, Chris Jericho faced Nick Gage in a No Rules match as part of "Labours of Jericho" set up by MJF, who joined commentary for this match. Match included many dangerous spots involving light tubes and glass but in the end, Jericho won. MJF then announced that next week, Jericho will face Juventud Guerrera.

After show

After the main event (after the show went off-air), Tony Khan made an appearance in front of the crowd. The 100th episode of AEW Dark was filmed that night as well.

== Reception ==
=== Attendance and television ratings ===
Two days before the event, PWInsider reported that the show was nearly sold-out. According to WrestleTix on Twitter, the show in Charlotte was attended by nearly 7,000, making it (at the time), third biggest TV taping in AEW history, behind the debut episode in Washington, D.C. and October 16, 2019 taping in Philadelphia, Pennsylvania.

Fight for the Fallen averaged 1,108,000 television viewers on TNT, with a 0.45 rating in AEW's key demographic. The show's audience peaked at 1,240,000 million, highest since the debut episode of Dynamite, which aired in October 2019.

=== Domino's Pizza commercial controversy ===
During the main event match, Nick Gage attacked Chris Jericho with a pizza cutter, before the show coincidentally went into a commercial for Domino's Pizza. A spokesperson for Domino's indicated that the brand may pull their advertising from Dynamite, stating they "are assessing our advertising presence on it going forward".

While speaking on the Sean Waltman podcast, Gage stated that "I didn't even know about Domino's until it was over and someone told me... I started laughing. What a coincidence." Nick Gage would also take to Twitter to write: "sorry dominos didnt mean to offend you guess im too ultraviolent for tv oh well [sic]". Fellow AEW wrestler Jon Moxley would also label the occurrence as "a coincidence", and suggested that Domino's "needs to chill out".

One of the most subscribed YouTubers, PewDiePie, included this incident at the end of his "Bad Commercial Timing..." video.

== Results ==
No.	Results	Stipulations	Times
1	The Elite (Kenny Omega, Matt Jackson, Nick Jackson, Doc Gallows and Karl Anderson) (with Brandon Cutler and Michael Nakazawa) defeated "Hangman" Adam Page and The Dark Order (Evil Uno, Stu Grayson, John Silver, and Alex Reynolds)^{1}	10-man tag team elimination match Had Page and The Dark Order won, they would have received a future match for Omega's AEW World Championship and The Young Bucks' AEW World Tag Team Championship, respectively.	25:35
2	FTR (Cash Wheeler and Dax Harwood) (with Tully Blanchard) defeated Santana and Ortiz (with Konnan)	Tag team match	8:00
3	Lance Archer (c) defeated Hikuleo (with King Haku)	Singles match for the IWGP United States Heavyweight Championship	8:00
4	Christian Cage and Jurassic Express (Jungle Boy and Luchasaurus) (with Marko Stunt) defeated Hardy Family Office (Angelico and Private Party (Isiah Kassidy and Marq Quen)) (with Matt Hardy)	Six-man tag team match	4:30
5	Thunder Rosa defeated Julia Hart (with Brian Pillman Jr. and Griff Garrison)	Singles match	4:00
6	"The Painmaker" Chris Jericho defeated Nick Gage	No Rules match	13:00
(c) / – the champion(s) heading into the match

=== Tag team elimination match ===
^1

Eliminated	Wrestler	Eliminated by	Method	Time
1	Alex Reynolds	Karl Anderson	Pinfall	4:10
2	Karl Anderson	Evil Uno	Pinfall	4:50
3	Stu Grayson	N/A	Countout	11:15
3	Doc Gallows	N/A	Countout	11:15
5	Evil Uno	Kenny Omega	Pinfall	12:30
6	John Silver	Matt Jackson	Pinfall	19:05
7	Matt Jackson	"Hangman" Adam Page	Pinfall	24:00
8	"Hangman" Adam Page	Kenny Omega	Pinfall	25:35
Winner(s):	The Elite (Nick Jackson and Kenny Omega)			

== See also ==
- 2021 in professional wrestling
