= Fight for the Fallen (2019) =

All Elite Wrestling special event

- Promotional poster featuring various AEW wrestlers
- Promotion: All Elite Wrestling
- Date: July 13, 2019
- City: Jacksonville, Florida
- Venue: Daily's Place
- Attendance: ~ 5,000

Event chronology
← Previous; Fyter Fest	Next → All Out

Fight for the Fallen chronology
← Previous; First	Next → 2020

The 2019 Fight for the Fallen was a professional wrestling livestreaming charity event produced by All Elite Wrestling (AEW). It was the inaugural Fight for the Fallen and took place on July 13, 2019, from Daily's Place in Jacksonville, Florida. The charity event supported victims of gun violence, a reference to the event's title. The special event was livestreamed for free on B/R Live in North America and was available through pay-per-view internationally. So far, this is the only Fight for the Fallen event to be broadcast on pay-per-view, as beginning in 2020, Fight for the Fallen became a television special of AEW's weekly programs.

The card comprised nine matches, including two on the Buy In pre-show. In the main event, The Young Bucks (Matt Jackson and Nick Jackson) defeated The Brotherhood (Cody and Dustin Rhodes). Other prominent matches saw Kenny Omega defeat Cima and Adam Page defeat Kip Sabian.

== Production ==
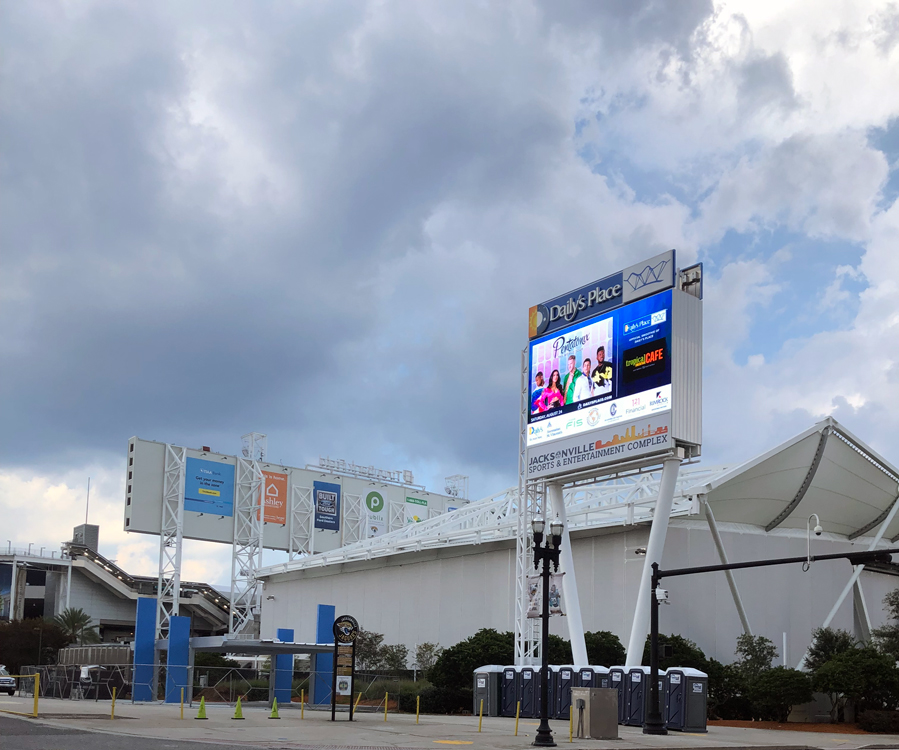
The inaugural Fight for the Fallen was held at Daily's Place in Jacksonville, Florida, which would later become All Elite Wrestling's home base.

=== Background ===
The American professional wrestling promotion All Elite Wrestling (AEW) was founded in January 2019. The company then held its inaugural event, Double or Nothing, in May, followed by Fyter Fest in June. Fight for the Fallen was scheduled as AEW's third-ever event to be held on Saturday, July 13, 2019, at Daily's Place in Jacksonville, Florida; Daily's Place would later become AEW's home base. It was scheduled to be held as a charity event in which all of the gate proceeds would be donated to victims of gun violence, a reference to the event's title. A portion of proceeds from the special event were directed to people affected by gun violence.

On July 9, AEW wrestler Chris Jericho was announced as appearing in a non-wrestling role at the event. Fight for the Fallen was livestreamed for free on the B/R Live streaming service in North America and was available through pay-per-view internationally.

=== Storylines ===
Fight for the Fallen comprised nine professional wrestling matches, including two on the pre-show, that involved different wrestlers from pre-existing scripted feuds and storylines, written by AEW's writers. Storylines were produced on The Young Bucks' YouTube series Being The Elite and Cody's Nightmare Family YouTube series The Road to Fight for the Fallen.

At Double or Nothing after Cody had defeated his brother Dustin Rhodes, he said that as an Executive Vice President of AEW, he had scheduled himself to have a tag team match against The Young Bucks (Matt Jackson and Nick Jackson) at Fight for the Fallen. He said that he did not need just any partner, he needed his brother, to which Cody and Dustin embraced, confirming that The Young Bucks would face The Brotherhood (Cody and Dustin) at the event.

Just prior to the event, it was announced that The Dark Order (Evil Uno and Stu Grayson), Angélico and Jack Evans, and Jungle Boy and Luchasaurus would face off in a three-way tag team match at Fight for the Fallen with the winning team advancing to All Out on August 31 for an opportunity at a first round bye in the AEW World Tag Team Championship tournament.

== Event ==
Other on-screen personnel
Role	Name
Commentators	Jim Ross (PPV)
Commentators	Excalibur (Pre-show + PPV)
Commentators	Alex Marvez (Pre-show + PPV)
Ring announcer	Justin Roberts
Referees	Aubrey Edwards
Referees	Bryce Remsburg
Referees	Rick Knox
Interviewer	Jenn Decker

=== The Buy In ===
Two matches occurred during the Buy In. In the first, Sonny Kiss faced Peter Avalon. Kiss performed a Split-Legged Leg Drop on Avalon to win.

In the second, Bea Priestley and Shoko Nakajima faced Dr. Britt Baker, D.M.D. and Riho. Nakajima pinned Riho with a roll up to win.

=== Preliminary matches ===
The event opened with MJF, Sammy Guevara, and Shawn Spears facing Darby Allin, Jimmy Havoc, and Joey Janela. Spears performed a Death Valley Driver on Allin to win.

Next, Brandi Rhodes (accompanied by Awesome Kong) faced Allie. Brandi performed a Spear on Allie to win. After the match, Awesome Kong was confronted by Aja Kong.

After that, The Dark Order (Evil Uno and Stu Grayson), Angélico and Jack Evans, and A Boy and His Dinosaur (Jungle Boy and Luchasaurus) competed to advance to All Out for an opportunity at a first round bye in the AEW World Tag Team Championship tournament. Grayson and Uno performed Fatality on Jungle Boy to win.

Later, Adam Page faced Kip Sabian. Page performed a Dead Eye on Sabian to win. After the match, a disguised Chris Jericho appeared and performed a Codebreaker and a Judas Effect on Page.

In the fifth match, AAA World Tag Team Champions Lucha Brothers (Pentagon Jr and Rey Fenix) faced SoCal Uncensored (Kazarian and Scorpio Sky) in a non-title match. Pentagon and Fenix performed a Fear Factor/Diving Double Foot Stomp combination on Sky to win. After the match, Pentagon and Fenix struck Christopher Daniels, Kazarian, and Sky with a ladder. Pentagon and Fenix then challenged The Young Bucks (Matt Jackson and Nick Jackson) to a ladder match with their AAA World Tag Team Championship on the line at All Out.

In the penultimate match, Kenny Omega faced Cima. Omega performed a One-Winged Angel on Cima to win.

Chris Jericho cut a promo, proclaiming he would defeat Adam Page for the inaugural AEW World Championship at All Out. Page appeared and attacked Jericho. Officials separated Jericho and Page.

=== Main event ===
In the main event, The Young Bucks (Matt and Nick Jackson) faced The Brotherhood (Cody and Dustin Rhodes). Cody and Dustin simultaneously performed Shatter Dreams and Final Cuts on Matt and Nick for a near-fall. Nick performed Cross Rhodes on Cody and Matt scored a near-fall. Matt and Nick performed a Meltzer Driver on Cody to win.

== Reception ==
Jason Powell of Pro Wrestling Dot Net described Fight for the Fallen as overall "a good show", although he thought that many matches suffered a bit for going long, and he felt that fatigue set in with a crowd that had been in the heat for over four hours.

== Aftermath ==
Fight for the Fallen would continue as an annual summer event for AEW, but held as special episodes of AEW's television programs Dynamite (2020–present), Rampage (2022–present), and Collision (2023–present).

== Results ==
No.	Results	Stipulations	Times
1^{P}	Sonny Kiss defeated Peter Avalon (with Leva Bates)	Singles match	5:10
2^{P}	Bea Priestley and Shoko Nakajima defeated Dr. Britt Baker, D.M.D. and Riho	Tag team match	15:15
3	MJF, Sammy Guevara, and Shawn Spears defeated Darby Allin, Jimmy Havoc, and Joey Janela	Six-man tag team match	13:15
4	Brandi Rhodes (with Awesome Kong) defeated Allie	Singles match	11:00
5	The Dark Order (Evil Uno and Stu Grayson) defeated Angélico and Jack Evans and Jurassic Express (Jungle Boy and Luchasaurus) (with Marko Stunt)	Three-way tag team match To advance to All Out for an opportunity at a first round bye in the AEW World Tag Team Championship tournament	15:15
6	Adam Page defeated Kip Sabian	Singles match	19:05
7	Lucha Brothers (Pentagón Jr. and Rey Fénix) defeated SoCal Uncensored (Frankie Kazarian and Scorpio Sky) (with Christopher Daniels)	Tag team match	15:10
8	Kenny Omega defeated Cima	Singles match	22:30
9	The Young Bucks (Matt Jackson and Nick Jackson) defeated The Brotherhood (Cody and Dustin Rhodes)	Tag team match	31:25
P / – the match was broadcast on the pre-show

== See also ==
- 2019 in professional wrestling
- List of All Elite Wrestling pay-per-view events
