= Fight for the Fallen (2022) =

All Elite Wrestling two-part television special

- Promotional poster for the Dynamite broadcast featuring various AEW wrestlers
- Promotion: All Elite Wrestling
- Date: July 27, 2022 (aired July 27, 2022 and July 29, 2022)
- City: Worcester, Massachusetts
- Venue: DCU Center
- Attendance: 6,200

Event chronology
← Previous; 2021	Next → 2023

AEW Dynamite special episodes chronology
← Previous; Fyter Fest	Next → Quake by the Lake

AEW Rampage special episodes chronology
← Previous; Fyter Fest	Next → Quake by the Lake

The 2022 Fight for the Fallen was a two-part professional wrestling television special produced by All Elite Wrestling (AEW). It was the fourth annual Fight for the Fallen charity event and was held on July 27, 2022, at the DCU Center in Worcester, Massachusetts, encompassing the broadcasts of AEW's weekly television programs, Wednesday Night Dynamite and Friday Night Rampage. Dynamite aired live on TBS while Rampage aired on tape delay on July 29 on TNT. The event expanded upon the previous two years, which were only held as a special episode of Dynamite. For the event's charitable cause, it helped support the non-profit marine wildlife organization, Oceana, as the event took place during Shark Week, a major cross-promotional event with AEW broadcast partner Warner Bros. Discovery.

== Production ==
=== Background ===
Fight for the Fallen is a professional wrestling charity event held annually in July by All Elite Wrestling (AEW) since 2019. The fourth Fight for the Fallen event was held on July 27, 2022, at the DCU Center in Worcester, Massachusetts and aired as a two-part television special, encompassing the broadcasts of AEW's weekly television programs, Wednesday Night Dynamite and Friday Night Rampage. Dynamite aired live on TBS while Rampage aired on tape delay on July 29 on TNT. This year's event expanded upon the previous two years, which were only held as a special episode of Dynamite. For its charitable cause, AEW partnered with Oceana, a non-profit organization dedicated to defending marine life and oceans around the world.

=== Storylines ===
Fight for the Fallen featured professional wrestling matches that involved different wrestlers from pre-existing scripted feuds and storylines, written by AEW's writers. Storylines were produced on AEW's weekly television programs, Dynamite and Rampage, the supplementary online streaming shows, Dark and Elevation, and The Young Bucks' YouTube series Being The Elite.

== Results ==
Dynamite (aired live July 27)
No.	Results	Stipulations	Times
1	Jon Moxley (c) defeated Rush (with José the Assistant) by technical submission	Singles match for the interim AEW World Championship	13:27
2	Ricky Starks (c) defeated Danhausen by pinfall	Singles match for the FTW Championship	0:42
3	Hook defeated Ricky Starks (c) by submission	Singles match for the FTW Championship	2:02
4	Sammy Guevara (with Tay Conti) defeated Dante Martin (with Skye Blue) by pinfall	Singles match	9:01
5	Swerve Strickland defeated Tony Nese and Mark Sterling by pinfall	2-on-1 Handicap match Keith Lee was barred from ringside.	6:27
6	Thunder Rosa (c) defeated Miyu Yamashita by pinfall	Singles match for the AEW Women's World Championship	10:11
7	Daniel Garcia defeated Bryan Danielson by technical submission	Singles match	17:15
(c) / – the champion(s) heading into the match

Rampage (taped July 27, aired July 29)
No.	Results	Stipulations	Times
1	Orange Cassidy and Best Friends (Chuck Taylor and Trent Beretta) defeated Jay Lethal, Sonjay Dutt, and Satnam Singh by pinfall	Six-man tag team match	7:28
2	Ethan Page defeated Leon Ruffin by pinfall	Singles match	1:30
3	Lee Moriarty defeated Matt Sydal by submission	Singles match	7:54
4	Anna Jay defeated Ruby Soho by technical submission	Singles match	9:46

== See also ==
- 2022 in professional wrestling
