= Fight for the Fallen (2025) =

All Elite Wrestling television special

- Promotional poster featuring various wrestlers
- Promotion: All Elite Wrestling
- Date: January 1, 2025
- City: Asheville, North Carolina
- Venue: Harrah's Cherokee Center
- Attendance: 3,402
- Tagline: The Mother of All Simulcasts

Event chronology
← Previous; 2023	Next → —

AEW Dynamite special episodes chronology
← Previous; Dynamite on 34th Street	Next → Maximum Carnage

The 2025 Fight for the Fallen was a professional wrestling television special produced by All Elite Wrestling (AEW). It was the sixth Fight for the Fallen charity event and was held on New Year's Day on January 1, 2025, at Harrah's Cherokee Center in Asheville, North Carolina and aired live as a special episode of Wednesday Night Dynamite on TBS as well as the streaming service Max in the United States. This was the company's first event to be simulcast on television and Max, with all future AEW television programs to be simulcast on Max. This was the first Fight for the Fallen since August 2023 and the first one-night iteration since 2021. The event helped support victims of Hurricane Helene, which greatly affected the Asheville area in September 2024.

== Production ==
=== Background ===
Fight for the Fallen is a professional wrestling charity event held by All Elite Wrestling (AEW) since 2019—it was originally held in July but moved to August in 2023. An event was not held in 2024, but on November 19 that year, AEW announced that the sixth Fight for the Fallen would be held on New Year's Day on January 1, 2025, and broadcast live as a special episode of Wednesday Night Dynamite on TBS in the United States. Additionally, the television special aired on the streaming service Max, marking AEW's first program to simulcast on television and Max, with all of AEW's television programs to be simulcast on Max going forward. The event was held at Harrah's Cherokee Center in Asheville, North Carolina and benefited victims of Hurricane Helene, which greatly affected the Asheville area in September 2024.

=== Storylines ===
Fight for the Fallen featured professional wrestling matches that involved different wrestlers from pre-existing scripted feuds and storylines, written by AEW's writers. Storylines were produced on AEW's weekly television programs, Dynamite, Rampage, and Collision.

== Results ==
No.	Results	Stipulations	Times
1	"Hangman" Adam Page defeated Orange Cassidy by pinfall	Singles match	15:16
2	The Hurt Syndicate (Bobby Lashley and Shelton Benjamin) (with MVP) defeated The Acclaimed (Anthony Bowens and Max Caster) by submission	Tag team match	4:01
3	Julia Hart defeated Jamie Hayter by pinfall	Singles match	10:06
4	Jay White defeated Swerve Strickland (with Prince Nana) and Roderick Strong by pinfall	Three-way match for the #1 spot in the Casino Gauntlet match	10:43
5	Powerhouse Hobbs defeated Jon Cruz and Rob Killjoy by pinfall	Handicap match	0:58
6	Rated FTR (Cope, Cash Wheeler, and Dax Harwood) defeated Death Riders (Jon Moxley, Claudio Castagnoli, and Wheeler Yuta) (with Marina Shafir) by pinfall	Trios match	18:26
