= Fight for the Fallen (2023) =

All Elite Wrestling three-part television special

- Promotional poster for the Dynamite show
- Promotion: All Elite Wrestling
- Date: August 16 and 19, 2023 (aired August 16, 18, and 19, 2023)
- City: Nashville, Tennessee (Aug. 16); Lexington, Kentucky (Aug. 19)
- Venue: Bridgestone Arena (Nashville); Rupp Arena (Lexington)
- Attendance: Night 1: 4,700; Night 2: 4,700; Night 3: 3,228

Event chronology
← Previous; 2022	Next → 2025

AEW Dynamite special episodes chronology
← Previous; Blood & Guts	Next → Fyter Fest

AEW Rampage special episodes chronology
← Previous; Royal Rampage	Next → Fyter Fest

AEW Collision special episodes chronology
← Previous; Debut episode	Next → Fyter Fest

The 2023 Fight for the Fallen was a three-part professional wrestling television special produced by All Elite Wrestling (AEW). It was the fifth annual Fight for the Fallen charity event and was held on August 16 and 19, 2023, encompassing the broadcasts of AEW's weekly television programs, Wednesday Night Dynamite, Friday Night Rampage, and Saturday Night Collision. Dynamite and Rampage were held on August 16 at the Bridgestone Arena in Nashville, Tennessee, with Dynamite airing live on TBS and Rampage airing on tape delay on August 18 on sister network TNT, while Collision was held at the Rupp Arena in Lexington, Kentucky and aired live on August 19 on TNT. It expanded upon the previous year's event, which aired as Dynamite and Rampage. The event was held in support of the Maui Food Bank following the 2023 Hawaii wildfires. An event was not held in 2024 but returned on New Year's Day in 2025.

A total of 15 matches were held across the three shows. Nine were held on August 16, with five broadcast live on Dynamite and four taped for Rampage that aired on August 18, and six were broadcast live for Collision on August 19. In the main event of the Dynamite broadcast, The Young Bucks (Matt Jackson and Nick Jackson) defeated The Gunns (Austin Gunn and Colten Gunn). The show also had a promotional tie-in for the 2023 video game, The Texas Chain Saw Massacre, which was a "Texas Chain Saw Massacre Deathmatch" between Jeff Jarrett and Jeff Hardy that Jarrett won; the match also had an appearance from Leatherface. In the main event of the Rampage broadcast, Hikaru Shida and Skye Blue defeated The Outcasts (Ruby Soho and Toni Storm), while in the main event of the Collision broadcast, Darby Allin defeated Christian Cage.

== Production ==
Other on-screen personnel
Role	Name
Commentators	Excalibur (both shows)
Commentators	Tony Schiavone (both shows)
Commentators	Taz (Dynamite)
Commentators	Kevin Kelly (Collision)
Commentators	Nigel McGuinness (Collision)
Commentators	Jim Ross (Collision, main event only)
Ring announcers	Justin Roberts (both shows)
Ring announcers	Dasha Gonzalez (Collision)
Referees	Bryce Remsburg
Referees	Paul Turner
Referees	Aubrey Edwards
Referees	Rick Knox
Referees	Stephon Smith
Interviewers	Renee Paquette
Interviewers	Lexy Nair
Interviewers	Tony Schiavone

=== Background ===
Fight for the Fallen is a professional wrestling charity event held annually in the summer by All Elite Wrestling (AEW) since 2019. The fifth Fight for the Fallen was announced on August 11, 2023. It expanded upon the two-night format established by the previous year's event and aired as a three-part television special, encompassing the broadcasts of AEW's weekly television programs, Wednesday Night Dynamite, Friday Night Rampage, and Saturday Night Collision, the latter a third program that launched in June. Unlike the previous four events, which were held in July, the 2023 event was pushed back to August.

Dynamite and Rampage were held on August 16 at the Bridgestone Arena in Nashville, Tennessee, with Dynamite airing live on TBS and Rampage airing on tape delay on August 18 on TNT, while Collision was held on August 19 at the Rupp Arena in Lexington, Kentucky and aired live on TNT. In response to the Hawaii wildfires that occurred in early August, the Maui Food Bank was supported as the event's charitable cause.

=== Storylines ===
Fight for the Fallen featured professional wrestling matches that involved different wrestlers from pre-existing scripted feuds and storylines, written by AEW's writers. Storylines were produced on AEW's weekly television programs, Dynamite, Rampage, and Collision.

== Results ==
=== Night 1 ===
Dynamite (aired live August 16)
No.	Results	Stipulations	Times
1	Orange Cassidy (c) defeated Wheeler Yuta by pinfall	Singles match for the AEW International Championship	11:49
2	Darby Allin and Nick Wayne defeated Gates of Agony (Bishop Kaun and Toa Liona) by pinfall	Tag team match	6:27
3	Jeff Jarrett (with Karen Jarrett, Jay Lethal, Sonjay Dutt, and Satnam Singh) defeated Jeff Hardy (with Ethan Page, Brother Zay, and Matt Hardy) by pinfall	The Texas Chain Saw Massacre Deathmatch	10:04
4	Dr. Britt Baker, D.M.D. defeated The Bunny (with Penelope Ford) by pinfall	Qualifier match for the AEW Women's World Championship match at All In	7:31
5	The Young Bucks (Matt Jackson and Nick Jackson) defeated The Gunns (Austin Gunn and Colten Gunn) by pinfall	Tag team match	9:40
(c) / – the champion(s) heading into the match

=== Night 2 ===
Rampage (taped August 16, aired August 18)
No.	Results	Stipulations	Times
1	Rey Fénix defeated Komander by pinfall	Singles match	12:57
2	Aussie Open (Kyle Fletcher and Mark Davis) (c) defeated Ethan Page and Brother Zay by pinfall	Tag team match for the ROH World Tag Team Championship	9:18
3	Sammy Guevara defeated Jon Cruz by pinfall	Singles match	1:35
4	Hikaru Shida and Skye Blue defeated The Outcasts (Ruby Soho and Toni Storm) (with Saraya) by pinfall	Tag team match	10:08
(c) / – the champion(s) heading into the match

=== Night 3 ===
Collision (aired live August 19)
No.	Results	Stipulations	Times
1	Jay White (with Austin Gunn, Colten Gunn, and Juice Robinson) defeated Dalton Castle (with Brent Tate and Brandon Tate) by pinfall	Singles match	12:06
2	Bullet Club Gold (Austin Gunn, Colten Gunn, and Juice Robinson) (with Jay White) defeated Iron Savages (Jacked Jameson, Bronson, and Boulder) by pinfall	Six-man tag team match	9:31
3	Big Bill (with Ricky Starks) defeated Derek Neal by pinfall	Singles match	1:07
4	Willow Nightingale defeated Diamanté by pinfall	Singles match	11:02
5	Powerhouse Hobbs defeated Kevin Ku by pinfall	Singles match	1:58
6	Darby Allin defeated Christian Cage (with Luchasaurus) by pinfall	Singles match	20:34

== See also ==
- 2023 in professional wrestling
