= Fight for the Fallen (2020) =

All Elite Wrestling television special

- Promotional poster
- Promotion: All Elite Wrestling
- Date: July 15, 2020
- City: Jacksonville, Florida
- Venue: Daily's Place
- Attendance: 0 (behind closed doors) (Note: The event was held without a paying audience due to the COVID-19 pandemic in the United States, though it featured a live crowd of AEW wrestlers and personnel.)

Fight for the Fallen chronology
| ← Previous; 2019 | Next → 2021 |

AEW Dynamite special episodes chronology
| ← Previous; Fyter Fest | Next → Winter Is Coming |

The 2020 Fight for the Fallen was a professional wrestling television special produced by All Elite Wrestling (AEW). It was the second annual Fight for the Fallen charity event and took place on July 15, 2020, at Daily's Place in Jacksonville, Florida as a special episode of Wednesday Night Dynamite on TNT in the United States. For the event's charitable cause, it helped raise money for COVID-19 relief. This event changed the broadcasting format of Fight for the Fallen, as beginning with this event, it became a television special of AEW's weekly programs.

== Production ==
Other on-screen personnel
| Role | Name |
|---|---|
| Commentators | Jim Ross |
| Commentators | Excalibur |
| Commentators | Taz (1st hour) |
| Commentators | Chris Jericho (2nd hour) |
| Ring announcer | Justin Roberts |
| Referees | Aubrey Edwards |
| Referees | Mike Posey |
| Referees | Paul Turner |
| Referees | Rick Knox |
| Interviewers | Alex Marvez |
| Interviewers | Dasha Gonzalez |

=== Background ===
In June 2019, All Elite Wrestling (AEW) held a professional wrestling charity event titled Fight for the Fallen. All gate proceeds from the event were donated to victims of gun violence, which was a reference to the event's title. AEW and event sponsor Farah & Farah, a personal injury law firm located in Jacksonville, Florida, raised more than US$150,000 and the proceeds from the gate were donated to the Jacksonville Victim Assistance Advisory Council.

During Night 1 of Fyter Fest on July 1, 2020, it was announced that instead of airing on pay-per-view (PPV), the second Fight for the Fallen charity event would be broadcast as a special episode of AEW's weekly television program, Dynamite, on July 15. Due to the COVID-19 pandemic that began affecting the industry in mid-March, the event was held behind closed doors at Daily's Place in Jacksonville. Also due to the pandemic, it was announced that this second Fight for the Fallen event would raise money for COVID-19 relief, which would be added to the $1 million already donated by AEW President and Chief Executive Officer Tony Khan and his father Shahid Khan. As fans were unable to attend the event, AEW launched an online donation drive and released a limited-edition Fight for the Fallen t-shirt on ShopAEW.com with 100% of the proceeds benefiting Florida's First Coast Relief Fund and Feeding Northeast Florida.

=== Storylines ===
Fight for the Fallen featured professional wrestling matches that involved different wrestlers from pre-existing scripted feuds and storylines, written by AEW's writers. Storylines were produced on AEW's weekly television program, Dynamite, the supplementary online streaming show, Dark, and The Young Bucks' YouTube series Being The Elite.

At Double or Nothing, the debuting Brian Cage won the nine-man Casino Ladder Match to earn a future AEW World Championship opportunity. During the media scrum following Double or Nothing's broadcast, Tony Khan announced that Cage's championship match against Jon Moxley, who successfully defended the title against Mr. Brodie Lee that night, would main event Night 2 of Fyter Fest. After Moxley's wife, WWE employee Renee Young, had tested positive for COVID-19, the match was rescheduled for Fight for the Fallen due to possible secondhand exposure; Moxley later tested negative twice.

On July 13, Chris Jericho was announced as appearing in a non-wrestling role at the event.

== Reception ==
=== Television ratings ===
Fight for the Fallen averaged 788,000 television viewers on TNT and a 0.29 rating in AEW's key demographic.

== Results ==
| No. | Results | Stipulations | Times |
|---|---|---|---|
| 1 | Cody (c) (with Arn Anderson) defeated Sonny Kiss | Singles match for the AEW TNT Championship | 10:45 |
| 2 | FTR (Cash Wheeler and Dax Harwood) defeated Lucha Brothers (Pentagón Jr. and Rey Fénix) | Tag team match | 13:25 |
| 3 | The Elite (Kenny Omega, Matt Jackson and Nick Jackson) defeated Jurassic Express (Jungle Boy, Luchasaurus, and Marko Stunt) | Six-man tag team match | 15:05 |
| 4 | The Nightmare Sisters (Allie and Brandi Rhodes) (with Dustin Rhodes) defeated Kenzie Paige and MJ Jenkins | Tag team match | 2:00 |
| 5 | Jon Moxley (c) defeated Brian Cage (with Taz) by technical submission (Note: Cage's cornerman, Taz, threw in the towel while Cage was in a submission hold, allowing Moxley to win by submission.) | Singles match for the AEW World Championship | 15:00 |
(c) / – the champion(s) heading into the match

== See also ==
- 2020 in professional wrestling
