= Mark Sterling =

American professional wrestler

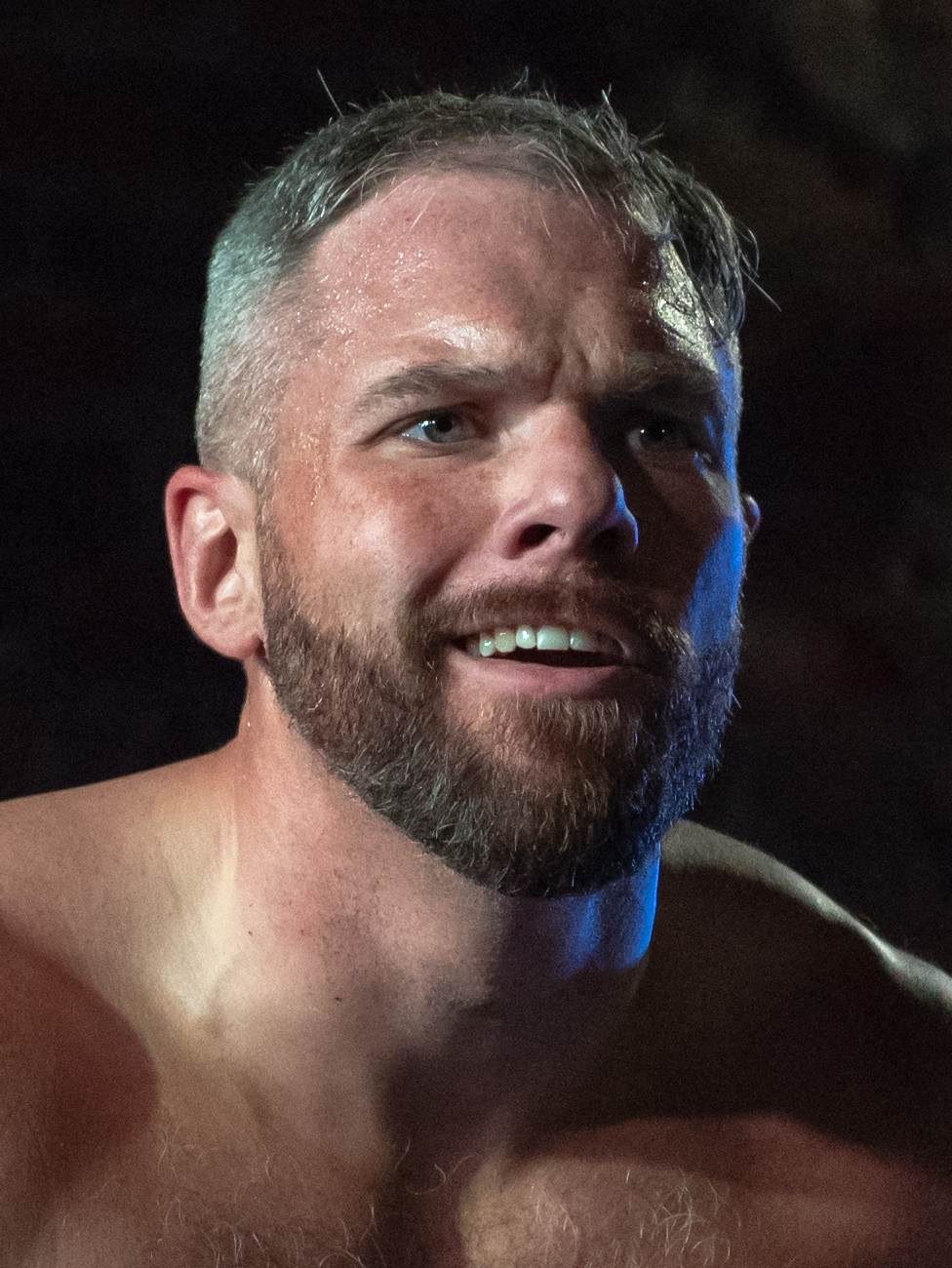
- Sterling in 2019

Personal information
- Born: Mark Rattelle; March 1, 1983 (age 43) Boston, Massachusetts, U.S.

Professional wrestling career
- Ring name(s): Mark Sterling "Smart" Mark Sterling
- Billed height: 5 ft 11 in (180 cm)
- Billed weight: 200 lb (91 kg)
- Trained by: Brian Myers; Pat Buck; Kevin Landry
- Debut: 2001

Mark Rattelle (born March 1, 1983) is an American professional wrestler and manager. He is signed to All Elite Wrestling (AEW) and its sister promotion Ring of Honor (ROH), where he performs under the ring name "Smart" Mark Sterling as the manager of The Premier Athletes (Tony Nese, Ariya Daivari and Stori Denali).

== Professional wrestling career ==
Rattelle was trained by Kevin Landry, Brian Myers, and Pat Buck at the Create-A-Pro Academy. He made his debut for All Elite Wrestling during the August 22, 2020 episode of Dynamite, where he portrayed a lawyer supporting MJF. He was defeated in a match against Jon Moxley on September 2, 2020.

On May 28, 2021, he offered his services to Jade Cargill and her stable 'The Baddies' with him- regularly accompanying Cargill to the ring, until being replaced by Stokely Hathaway in May 2022. He became aligned with Tony Nese upon his debut for the company in December 2021. At the Buy in for Double or Nothing (2022), he teamed with Nese in a losing effort against Danhausen and Hook. On July 27, 2022 at Fight for the Fallen, he again teamed with Nese, losing to Swerve Strickland.

== Personal life ==
Rattelle is close friends with Matt Cardona and Brian Myers, and produces the Major Wrestling Figure Podcast alongside them.

== Championships and accomplishments ==
- Blitzkrieg! Pro
  - B!P Bedlam Championship (1 time)
- Create A Pro Wrestling
  - CAP Championship (1 time)
  - CAP Tag Team Championship (2 times) – with Swoggle (1) and Brian Myers (1)
- Pioneer Valley Promotions
  - PVP World Championship (1 time)
