= AEW Quake by the Lake =

2022 All Elite Wrestling two-part television special

Quake by the Lake
- Promotional poster featuring various AEW wrestlers
- Promotion: All Elite Wrestling
- Date: August 10, 2022 (aired August 10 and 12, 2022)
- City: Minneapolis, Minnesota
- Venue: Target Center
- Attendance: 5,600

AEW Dynamite special episodes chronology
← Previous; Fight for the Fallen	Next → Grand Slam

AEW Rampage special episodes chronology
← Previous; Fight for the Fallen	Next → Grand Slam

AEW Quake by the Lake was a professional wrestling two-part television special produced by All Elite Wrestling (AEW). It was held on August 10, 2022, at the Target Center in Minneapolis, Minnesota, encompassing the broadcasts of AEW's weekly television programs, Wednesday Night Dynamite and Friday Night Rampage. Dynamite aired live on TBS while Rampage aired on tape delay on August 12 on TNT. The event's name is in reference to it taking place in Minneapolis, which is known for its many lakes.

The card comprised a total of 10 matches, with six on the Dynamite broadcast and four on the Rampage broadcast. In the main event of the Dynamite broadcast, Jon Moxley defeated Chris Jericho to retain the interim AEW World Championship, while in the main event of the Rampage broadcast, Orange Cassidy defeated Ari Daivari. The Dynamite broadcast was also notable for the return of lineal AEW World Champion CM Punk, who had been out with an injury since the June 3, 2022, episode of Rampage.

== Production ==
=== Background ===
On June 20, 2022, All Elite Wrestling (AEW) announced that they would be holding an event on August 10 at the Target Center in Minneapolis, Minnesota titled Quake by the Lake, a reference to Minneapolis' many lakes. The event aired as a two-part television special, encompassing the broadcasts of AEW's weekly television programs, Wednesday Night Dynamite and Friday Night Rampage. Dynamite aired live on TBS while Rampage aired on tape delay on August 12 on TNT. This marked the Minneapolis debut of Dynamite and the first time back in the city since the November 12, 2021, episode of Rampage and Full Gear pay-per-view event on November 13.

=== Storylines ===
Quake by the Lake featured professional wrestling matches that involved different wrestlers from pre-existing scripted feuds and storylines. Wrestlers portrayed heroes, villains, or less distinguishable characters in scripted events that built tension and culminated in a wrestling match or series of matches. Storylines were produced on AEW's weekly television programs, Dynamite and Rampage, the supplementary online streaming shows, Dark and Elevation, and The Young Bucks' YouTube series Being The Elite.

At Revolution in February 2020, Jon Moxley defeated Chris Jericho to win the AEW World Championship. Two years later at Dynamite: Fight for the Fallen, with Moxley now serving as the interim AEW World Champion after winning the title at AEW x NJPW: Forbidden Door in June 2022, Jericho challenged Moxley to a match for the interim AEW World Championship at Dynamite: Quake by the Lake, which was made official. At Rampage: Fight for the Fallen, Jericho agreed to put his number one contendership on the line in a match against ROH Pure Champion Wheeler Yuta on the August 3 episode of Dynamite, in which he won.

On August 3, AEW announced that Madison Rayne would join the company as a coach in the women's division. However, the next day on Dark, Rayne stated that she will also wrestle for AEW. After defeating Leila Grey on the August 5 episode of Rampage, Rayne was invited by TBS Champion Jade Cargill to her open challenge for the title. The title match was then subsequently scheduled for Dynamite: Quake by the Lake.

At Royal Rampage, Brody King and Darby Allin were the last two competitors in the inaugural Royal Rampage Battle Royal match to earn a future interim AEW World Championship match, in which King won by dropping Allin to the floor after making him pass out in a sleeper hold. After King lost his championship match on the July 6 episode of Dynamite, Allin came out and offered King a handshake, but the latter denied. On July 9, King attacked Allin during an autograph signing. This led to a match on the second week of Dynamite: Fyter Fest that King won. Unsatisfied with his win, King attacked Allin once again on July 23 at San Diego Comic-Con. At Dynamite: Fight for the Fallen, King challenged Allin to a rematch at Dynamite: Quake by the Lake, this time in a coffin match, which Allin accepted.

On the June 24 episode of Rampage, Rush made his televised debut in AEW and assisted fellow La Facción Ingobernable member Andrade El Idolo in defeating Rey Fénix. After the match, Penta Oscuro ran to the aid of Fénix after Rush unmasked the latter. This resulted in a match between Oscuro and Rush on the July 6 episode of Dynamite, where Rush won after delivering a low blow and unmasking Oscuro. A tornado tag team match between the Lucha Brothers and La Facción Ingobernable was then announced for Dynamite: Quake by the Lake.

After the betrayal of Ricky Starks' former tag team partner, Q. T. Marshall made an offer to Starks to join the Factory on the August 3 episode of Dynamite, which Starks would immediately decline. A match between Starks and Factory member Aaron Solo was then announced for Dynamite: Quake by the Lake.

== Reception ==
=== Critical reception ===
Quake by the Lake received positive reviews from critics. Sports journalist Dave Meltzer of the Wrestling Observer Newsletter awarded the tornado tag team match 4 stars, and the main event match 4 3/4 stars.

=== Television ratings ===
Quake by the Lake averaged 972,000 television viewers on TBS, with a 0.33 rating in AEW's key demographic.

== Results ==
Dynamite (aired live August 10)
No.	Results	Stipulations	Times
1	Darby Allin defeated Brody King	Coffin match	14:00
2	La Facción Ingobernable (Andrade El Idolo and Rush) (with José the Assistant) defeated The Lucha Brothers (Penta Oscuro and Rey Fenix) (with Alex Abrahantes) by pinfall	Tornado tag team match	14:00
3	Luchasaurus defeated Anthony Henry (with JD Drake) by pinfall	Singles match	0:40
4	Ricky Starks defeated Aaron Solo by pinfall	Singles match	2:20
5	Jade Cargill (c) (with Stokely Hathaway and Kiera Hogan) defeated Madison Rayne by pinfall	Singles match for the AEW TBS Championship	7:50
6	Jon Moxley (c) (with William Regal) defeated Chris Jericho by submission	Singles match for the interim AEW World Championship	22:35
(c) / – the champion(s) heading into the match

Rampage (aired on tape delay August 12)
No.	Results	Stipulations	Times
1	Sammy Guevara and Tay Melo (c) defeated Dante Martin and Skye Blue by pinfall	Mixed tag team match for the AAA World Mixed Tag Team Championship	7:15
2	Parker Boudreaux (with Slim J) defeated Sonny Kiss by pinfall	Singles match	0:58
3	Gunn Club (Austin Gunn and Colten Gunn) (with Billy Gunn) defeated Beardhausen (Erick Redbeard and Danhausen) by pinfall	Tag team match	7:00
4	Orange Cassidy (with Best Friends (Chuck Taylor and Trent Beretta)) defeated Ari Daivari (with The Trustbusters (Slim J and Parker Boudreaux)) by pinfall	Singles match	12:04
(c) / – the champion(s) heading into the match

== See also ==
- 2022 in professional wrestling
- List of All Elite Wrestling special events
- List of AEW Dynamite special episodes
- List of AEW Rampage special episodes
