= Jurassic Express =

American professional wrestling tag team

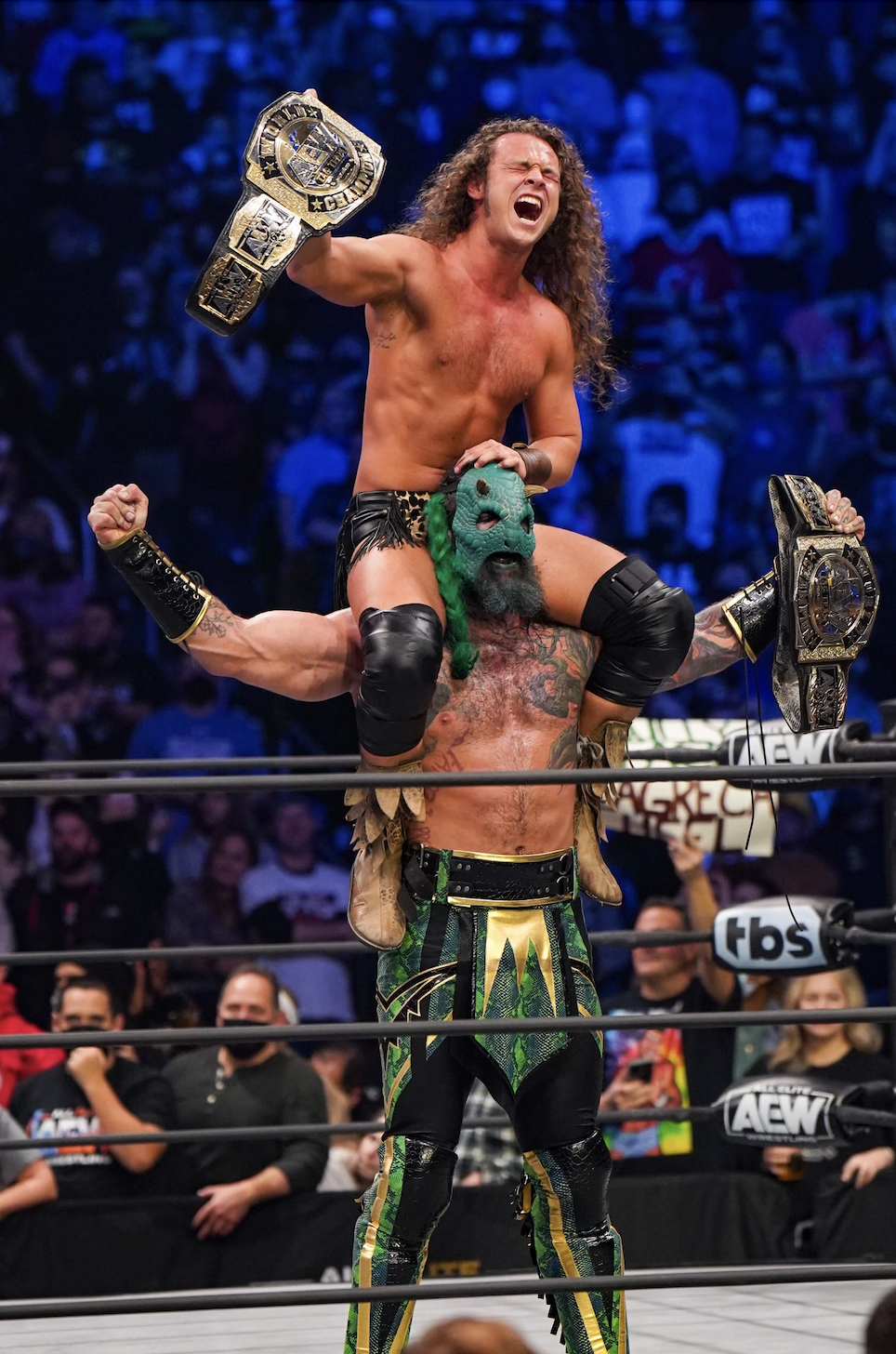
- Jurassic Express, Jungle Boy (top) and Luchasaurus (bottom) in 2022

Tag team
- Members: Jungle Boy / Jack Perry; Luchasaurus
- Name(s): Jurassic Express; A Boy and His Dinosaur; A Man and His Monster
- Billed heights: Perry: 5 ft 10 in (1.78 m); Luchasaurus: 6 ft 5 in (1.96 m)
- Combined billed weight: Jack Perry and Luchasaurus: 465 lb (211 kg); Perry: 190 lb (86 kg); Luchasaurus: 275 lb (125 kg)
- Former members: Marko Stunt
- Debut: July 13, 2019
- Years active: 2019–2022; 2025–present

Jurassic Express is a professional wrestling tag team that consists of Jack Perry and Luchasaurus. The team performs in All Elite Wrestling (AEW), where they are former one-time AEW World Tag Team Champions. They occasionally make appearances for Game Changer Wrestling (GCW).

== History ==
=== Independent circuit (2019) ===
Prior to signing with AEW, Jungle Boy and Luchasaurus teamed on the independent circuit, as A Boy and His Dinosaur.

=== All Elite Wrestling (2019–2022; 2025–present) ===
==== First run (2019–2022) ====
In July 2019, Marko Stunt was added to the team, and the three made their first appearance together at AEW's Fight for the Fallen event, under the name Jurassic Express. At All Out on August 31, the Jurassic Express was defeated by SoCal Uncensored (Christopher Daniels, Frankie Kazarian and Scorpio Sky) in a six-man tag team match. In October, Jungle Boy and Stunt competed in a tournament to determine the inaugural AEW World Tag Team Champions, but they were eliminated by the Lucha Brothers (Pentagón Jr. and Rey Fénix) in the first round. On the January 15, 2020 episode of Dark, the team obtained its first victory in AEW, after they defeated Strong Hearts (Cima, El Lindaman and T-Hawk). On the February 19 episode of Dynamite, Jungle Boy and Luchasaurus competed in a tag team battle royal to determine the number one contenders for the AEW World Tag Team Championship, but the match was won by The Young Bucks (Matt Jackson and Nick Jackson). On September 5 at All Out, Jungle Boy and Luchasaurus were defeated by The Young Bucks.

At the Revolution event on March 7, 2021, Jungle Boy and Luchasaurus competed in the Casino Tag Team Royale, but were unsuccessful in winning the match. In August 2021, Jungle Boy and Luchasaurus competed in a tag team eliminator tournament to determine the next contender for the tag team championship, but they were defeated by the Lucha Brothers in the finals.

On the TBS debut episode of Dynamite on January 5, 2022, Jungle Boy and Luchasaurus would defeat The Lucha Brothers to win their first AEW Tag Team Championship. On the June 15 edition of Dynamite, Jurassic Express lost the titles to The Young Bucks. Immediately after the match, Christian Cage turned heel and attacked Jungle Boy. At Blood and Guts two weeks later, Luchasaurus aligned himself with Cage, turning heel and seemingly ending Jurassic Express. However, at Fyter Fest: Week 2 on July 20, after Cage and Luchasaurus' match against The Varsity Blonds (Griff Garrison and Brian Pillman Jr., Luchasaurus stepped out of the way and allowed the returning Jungle Boy to chase Cage with a steel chair, apparently reuniting Jurassic Express. At All Out on September 4, Luchasaurus attacked Jungle Boy during his entrance for his match with Cage, turning heel once again and officially ending the team.

==== Reunion (2025–present) ====
At All Out on September 20, 2025, Luchasaurus came to the aid of Jungle Boy (now known as Jack Perry) from The Young Bucks. The duo then embraced, officially reuniting Jurassic Express. On October 7 at Dynamite: Title Tuesday, Jurassic Express wrestled their first match as a team in three years, defeating enhancement talents in a squash match. On October 18 at WrestleDream, Jurassic Express defeated The Young Bucks. At Full Gear on November 22, Jurassic Express teamed with Kenny Omega, losing to the Young Bucks and Josh Alexander; post-match, Alexander and the Don Callis Family (Rocky Romero, Mark Davis, El Clon and Hechicero) attacked Omega and Jurassic Express until the Young Bucks returned to aid them. After fending off the Don Callis Family, Jurassic Express and The Young Bucks shook hands, signaling the end of their feud. On December 31 at Dynamite: New Year's Smash, Luchasaurus was attacked by The Demand (Ricochet, Bishop Kaun, and Toa Liona) This was done to write him off television as he had suffered a legitmate shoulder injury and would miss some time, putting the team on hiatus.

During Luchsaurus' hiatus, Perry would win the AEW National Championship on March 15, 2026 at Revolution in a 21-man Blackjack Battle Royal. On April 18, Marko Stunt rejoined Jurassic Express for one-night only at Joey Janela’s Spring Break 10, teaming with Perry to defeat KJ Orso and Sam Stackhouse. On May 9 at Fairway to Hell, Perry lost his title to Mark Davis due to interference from Ricochet, ending his reign at 55 days.

== Championships and accomplishments ==
- All Elite Wrestling
  - AEW National Championship (1 time) – Jack Perry
  - AEW World Tag Team Championship (1 time) – Jungle Boy and Luchasaurus
  - Men's Casino Battle Royale (2021) – Jungle Boy
- DDT Pro-Wrestling
  - Ironman Heavymetalweight Championship (2 times) – Jungle Boy (1) and Marko Stunt (1)
- Pro Wrestling Illustrated
  - Ranked Jungle Boy No. 69 of the top 500 singles wrestlers in the PWI 500 in 2021
  - Ranked Luchasaurus No. 105 of the top 500 singles wrestlers in the PWI 500 in 2020
  - Ranked Marko Stunt No. 182 of the top 500 singles wrestlers in the PWI 500 in 2020
- Wrestling Observer Newsletter
  - Rookie of the Year (2019) – Jungle Boy
