= Sammy Guevara =

American professional wrestler

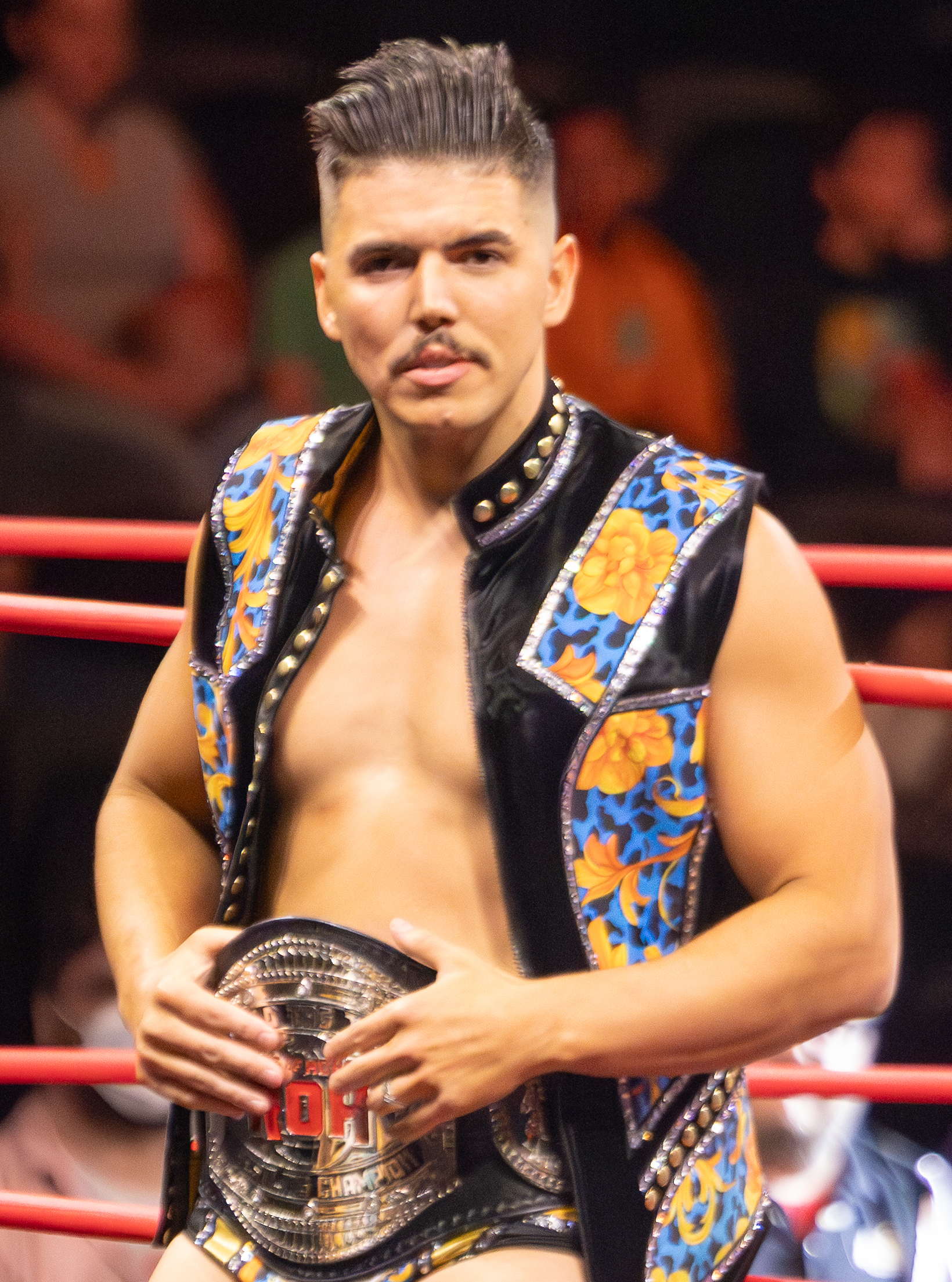
- Guevara in 2026

Personal information
- Born: Samuel Guevara; July 28, 1993 (age 33) Houston, Texas, U.S.
- Spouse: Tay Melo (m. 2022)
- Children: 1

Professional wrestling career
- Ring name: Sammy Guevara
- Billed height: 5 ft 10 in (178 cm)
- Billed weight: 195 lb (88 kg)
- Billed from: Houston, Texas
- Trained by: Booker T Reality of Wrestling
- Debut: December 11, 2010

Samuel Guevara (born July 28, 1993) is an American professional wrestler. He is signed to All Elite Wrestling (AEW), where he is a member of La Facción Ingobernable (LFI) and is a record tying three-time former AEW TNT Champion. He also appears in AEW's sister promotion Ring of Honor (ROH), where he is a former three-time ROH World Tag Team Champion.

Guevara made his professional wrestling debut in 2010 - after being trained by Booker T - beginning his career in Booker's Reality of Wrestling promotion. Throughout the 2010s, he worked for numerous U.S. companies, most notably Impact Wrestling. He has also wrestled in Japan with DDT Pro Wrestling. Guevara has been with AEW since the promotion's founding in 2019, featured early on as a member of Chris Jericho's first stable, The Inner Circle. He has previously worked for Lucha Libre AAA Worldwide (AAA), where he is a former AAA Mixed Tag Team Champion with real life wife Tay Melo, and a former AAA Cruiserweight Champion.

== Early life ==
Sammy Guevara was born on July 28, 1993, in Houston, Texas, to a Cuban father and an American mother. He grew up in the nearby suburb of Katy, Texas, and his parents divorced when Sammy was young. Guevara became a fan of wrestling in 2004 when he went to a WWE Smackdown show in Houston where he saw Booker T and Rey Mysterio wrestle. He later decided he wanted to become a professional wrestler, so he went to Booker T's Reality of Wrestling wrestling school in Houston in 2010.

== Professional wrestling career ==
=== Early career (2010–2019) ===
Guevara in 2017

After graduating from Booker T's professional wrestling school, Guevara made his major promotion debut on January 5, 2013, for the National Wrestling Alliance (NWA). On April 7, 2016, Guevara wrestled a AAA tag team dark match with Tony Guevara (The Laredo Kid) against Los Matadores (Primo and Epico Colón).

Guevara first worked for Impact Wrestling in 2017 on its weekly TV show, Impact Xplosion, in a tag team match (with Davey Richards) against Drago and Taiji Ishimori. Guevara was later in Impact's Super X Cup tournament, losing to Drago in its opening round.

Guevara debuted for Pro Wrestling Guerrilla (PWG) in its 2017 Battle of Los Angeles tournament, advancing to the quarterfinals. Also in 2017, Guevera attended a tryout for WWE at their Performance Center and did a handful of dark matches for the promotion, but was not signed. At PWG's May 2018 Bask In His Glory event, Guevara wrestled PWG World Champion WALTER in the main event for the title.

On December 7, 2017, Guevara debuted in Major League Wrestling (MLW), and appeared many times on its TV show (MLW Fusion) in 2018. Guevara won the PWFP Ultimate Championship from Raja Naveed at the "Rumble in Pakistan" event on April 28, 2019, but was later stripped of the title for going 340+ days without making any title defenses.

=== Lucha Libre AAA Worldwide (2018–2019) ===
Guevara was a cast member for season four of Lucha Underground, the scripted TV show AAA co-produced with the El Rey network. Guevara made his Lucha Libre AAA World Wide debut at Verano de Escándalo 2018. He won the AAA World Cruiserweight Championship at the Triplemanía XXVI annual event on August before losing it to Laredo Kid on February 16, 2019. At Triplemanía XXVII, Guevara teamed up with Scarlett Bordeaux in a match for the AAA World Mixed Tag Team Championship where they were unsuccessful.

=== All Elite Wrestling / Ring of Honor (2019–present) ===
==== The Inner Circle (2019–2021) ====
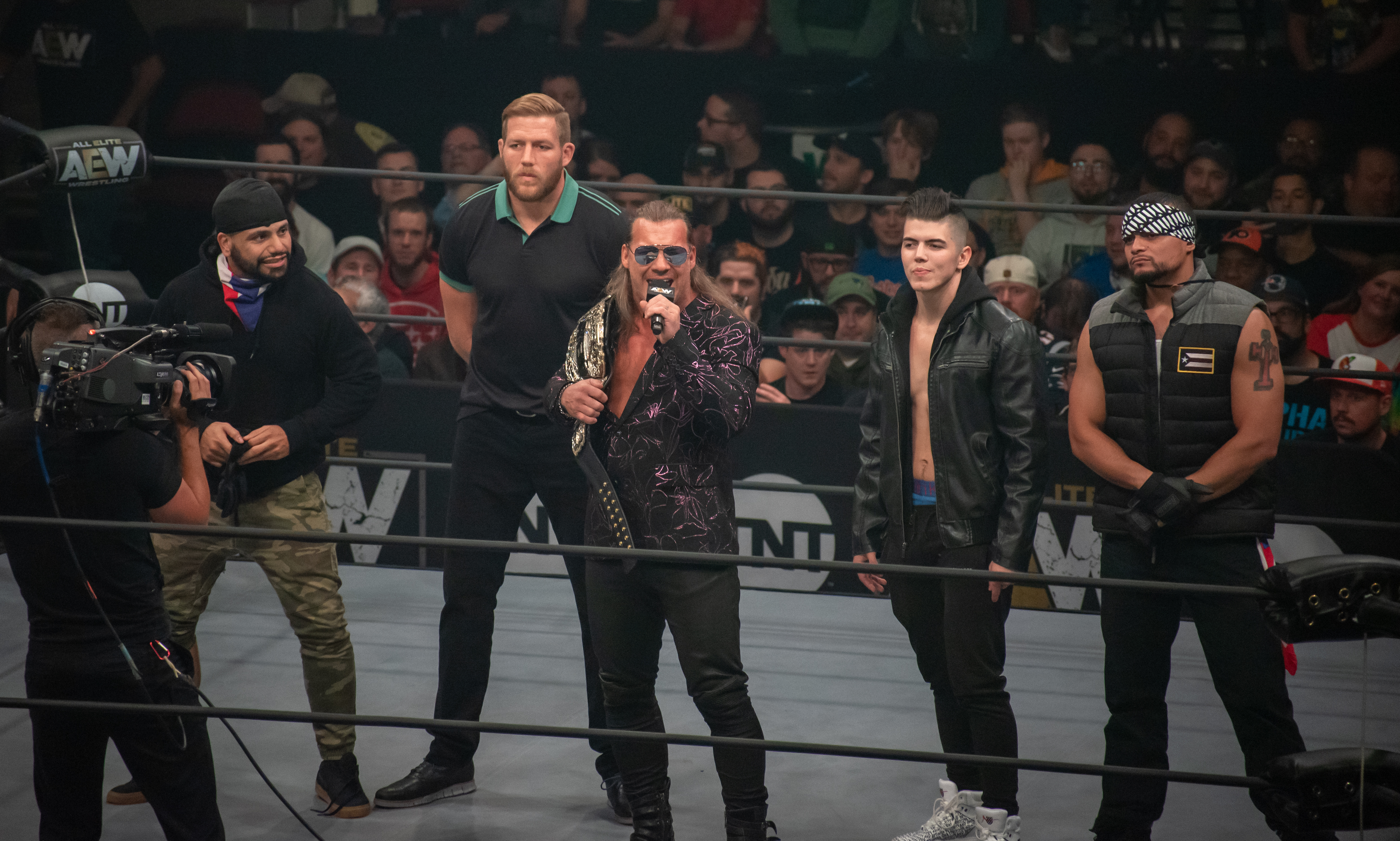
Guevara as part of the Inner Circle in 2019

On February 7, 2019, Guevara was announced to have signed with the newly formed All Elite Wrestling (AEW). At the promotion's inaugural event, Double or Nothing, on May 25, Guevara was defeated by Kip Sabian. At Fight for the Fallen on July 13, Guevara teamed with MJF and Shawn Spears to defeat Darby Allin, Jimmy Havoc and Joey Janela in a six-man tag team match. On the premiere episode of AEW Dynamite on October 2, Guevara lost to Cody. After the match, Guevara shook hands with Cody, before AEW World Champion Chris Jericho viciously attacked Cody from behind in front of him. Later on that night, Guevara established himself as a heel when he assisted AEW World Champion Chris Jericho, Jake Hager (who made his AEW debut), Santana and Ortiz attacking Cody, The Young Bucks and Cody's half-brother Dustin Rhodes. They created a group that would become known as "The Inner Circle". Guevara would then begin a feud with Darby Allin leading into 2020, all the while assisting Jericho in his rivalries and championship defenses. At Revolution on February 29, 2020, Guevara was defeated by Allin. On the March 25 episode of AEW, The Inner Circle and The Elite were set to compete in a Blood and Guts match, but the COVID-19 outbreak would cause AEW to postpone the match. Guevara would then compete in a tournament to crown the inaugural AEW TNT Champion. He was again beaten by Allin in the first round of the tournament. A match between Matt Hardy and The Elite (Adam Page, Kenny Omega and The Young Bucks) and The Inner Circle would be announced for Double or Nothing, called a Stadium Stampede match. At the event, The Inner Circle faced The Elite and Matt Hardy, but were unsuccessful in winning.

On June 22, 2020, Guevara was suspended by AEW after it was revealed that he made an inappropriate joke about wanting to "go rape" WWE wrestler Sasha Banks during a podcast in January 2016. He later made a YouTube video apologizing for the remarks and taking accountability for what he said. Later that day, Banks announced that she and Guevara were in contact with each other, that he had apologized to her, and that they had engaged in an "open discussion" to help him understand the severity of his comments. The conditions of his suspension are that he was required to attend sensitivity training, while his weekly pay was donated to the Women's Center of Jacksonville during the course of his suspension. Guevara returned on the July 22 episode of Dynamite, disguised as Serpentico, as he interfered to help Jericho and Hager defeat Jungle Boy and Luchasaurus in a tag team match.

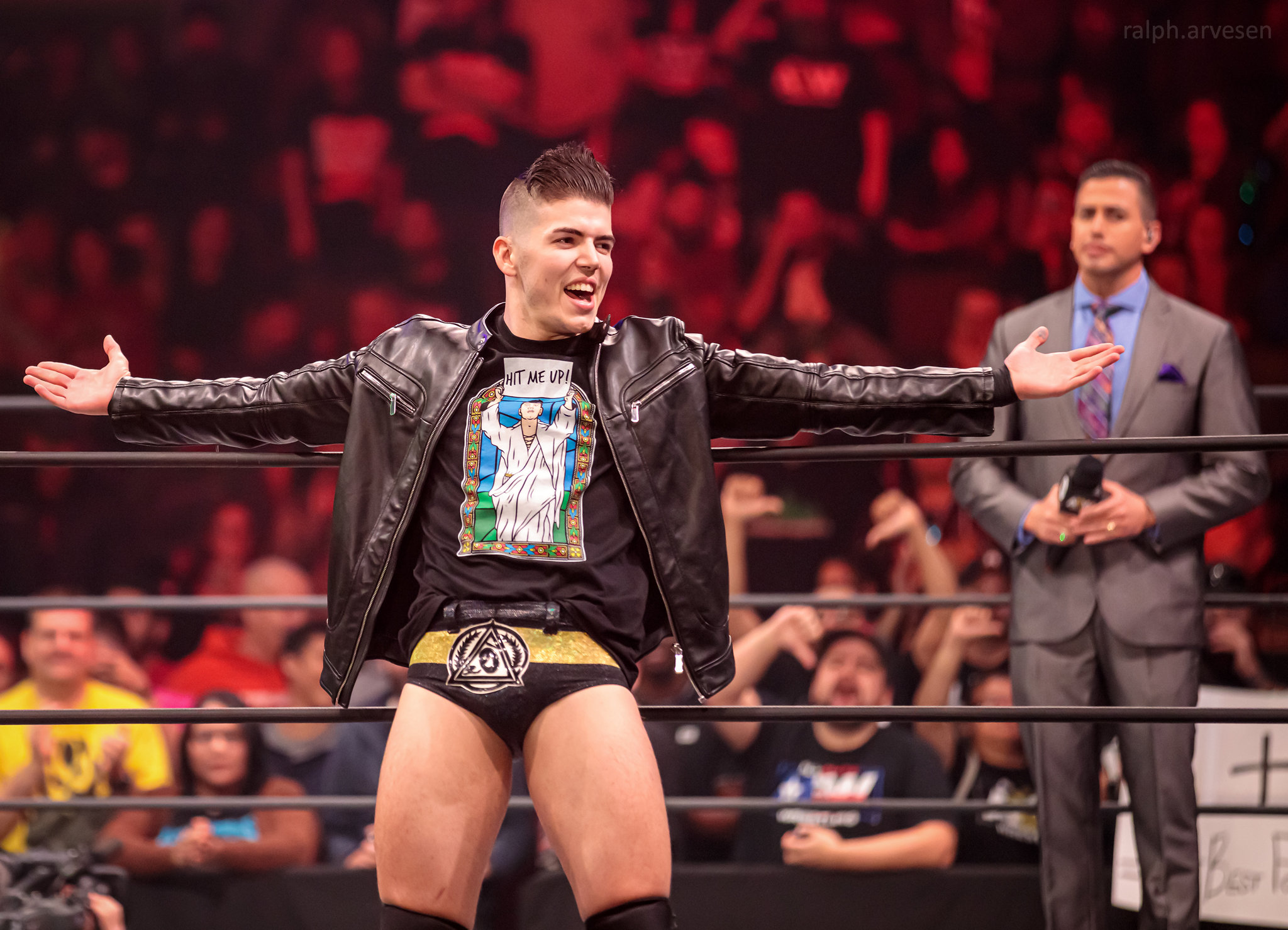
Guevara in 2022

After Guevara's return, he would resume his feud with Matt Hardy, however it was later paused due to Hardy sustaining an injury during a Broken Rules match at All Out. Their feud ended with a "The Elite Deletion" match at Full Gear, where Hardy won. At Full Gear, MJF and Wardlow became Guevara's new teammates in The Inner Circle after MJF defeated Jericho. On the December 9th Dynamite, Chris Jericho held an ultimatum for the Inner Circle, with many members showing frustrations with MJF. Sammy Guevara would declare that if one more thing happened with MJF, then he would quit the Inner Circle. The two would then shake hands.

On the February 10, 2021, edition of AEW Dynamite, following weeks of growing tension between the two, Guevara attacked MJF following a backstage confrontation which gave MJF a kayfabe rib injury. Later on that night, Guevara announced his departure from The Inner Circle. This was set to leave him appearing on Impact Wrestling, but both parties couldn't come to an agreement about Guevara's storylines. A month later on the March 10 episode of Dynamite, Guevara would make a return to AEW. He would reveal that he had set up a camera in The Inner Circle's locker room, which recorded MJF convincing Jake Hager, Santana, and Ortiz to turn on Chris Jericho. When it looked as though the three were about to attack Guevara and Jericho, they instead turned to MJF. Jericho would then fire MJF on the spot. However, MJF would state that he had already begun creating his own group, which led to Shawn Spears, Wardlow, FTR, and Tully Blanchard coming out and attacking The Inner Circle. On the March 31 episode of Dynamite, Guevara, along with all of the other Inner Circle members, would return yet again and attack the group now known as The Pinnacle. They would kick The Pinnacle out of their locker room, as they had taken over it during the Inner Circle's absence.

Two weeks later on April 7, Chris Jericho (along with the rest of the members of the Inner Circle) would challenge The Pinnacle to a Blood and Guts match. At AEW Blood and Guts, The Pinnacle would defeat The Inner Circle, after Guevara forfeited the match to save Chris Jericho from being pushed off the top of the cage by MJF. However, MJF would still push Jericho off the cage onto the ramp. On the next episode of Dynamite, The Inner Circle would interrupt The Pinnacle's celebration by coming out in a "Bubbly Truck" (reminiscent of when Kurt Angle sprayed The Alliance with milk in a truck.) The Inner Circle would do the same thing to The Pinnacle, spraying them with bubbly and ruining their celebration. However, MJF would challenge The Inner Circle to a Stadium Stampede match at Double or Nothing, with the stipulation being that if The Inner Circle lost, they had to disband. Chris Jericho would accept the match, with Guevara primarily wrestling Shawn Spears. At Double or Nothing, The Inner Circle would win after Guevara hit a 630 senton on Spears in the ring after an extensive backstage brawl between the two, keeping the group alive. On the episode following the pay-per-view, The Inner Circle would declare a "summer of violence" for the Pinnacle. On the June 30th edition of AEW Dynamite, Sammy Guevara would lose to MJF after Spears hit him with a chair to the head.

==== TNT Champion (2021–2022) ====
On September 29, Guevara won the AEW TNT Championship at Dynamite by defeating Miro. The next week, Guevara made his first successful defense against a debuting Bobby Fish. On December 25, at the special Holiday Bash episode of Rampage, Guevara lost the title to Cody Rhodes, ending his reign at 87 days. A TNT Championship rematch between Rhodes and Guevara was scheduled to take place at Battle of the Belts I on January 8, 2022. However, Rhodes was forced to withdraw after being exposed to COVID-19. An interim TNT title was created as a result, with a match between Guevara and Cody's brother, Dustin, being scheduled at Battle of the Belts instead. Guevara would go on to win the match and become the interim TNT champion. On January 26 at AEW Beach Break, Guevara defeated Cody Rhodes in a ladder match to unify the belts, becoming the undisputed (and two-time) TNT Champion. The match was awarded 5 stars by professional wrestling journalist Dave Meltzer, giving Guevara his first 5-star match. On the February 9, 2022, episode of AEW Dynamite, the Inner Circle had a team meeting that ended with Sammy Guevara throwing his vest and walking out. At Revolution 2022, Guevara would win a Tornado tag team match with Allin and Sting over Andrade El Idolo, Matt Hardy, and Isiah Kassidy.

On the March 9, 2022, episode Dynamite, Guevara would lose the TNT Championship to Scorpio Sky. Sammy would continue his feud with Scorpio Sky but with the inclusion of his girlfriend Tay Conti due to the official signing of Paige VanZant in AEW. At Battle of the Belts II, Sammy Guevara successfully ended Scorpio Sky's undefeated streak with a low blow, winning his record-tying 3rd TNT Championship. Sammy dropped the title back to Scorpio Sky on the April 27 episode of Dynamite in a ladder match, thus ending his reign at 12 days, which is the shortest reign in the title's history. Guevara also suffered injuries from the ladder match to his shoulder, as a result of a Twisting Splash from the top of a ladder. At Double or Nothing on May 29, 2022, Sky, VanZant and Ethan Page defeated Guevara, Frankie Kazarian and Tay Conti in a six-person tag team match, with Guevara and Kazarian losing the right to further challenge Sky for the TNT Championship as a result.

==== Jericho Appreciation Society (2022–2023) ====
On the June 15, 2022 Dynamite special episode Road Rager, Guevara (dressed as Fuego Del Sol) interfered in the hair vs hair match between Ortiz and Chris Jericho, costing Ortiz the match and reuniting with Jericho and Hager, officially turning heel and joining the Jericho Appreciation Society. On June 26 at Forbidden Door, Guevara and Jericho, under the sub-unit of "Le Sex Gods" teamed with Minoru Suzuki defeating Eddie Kingston, Shota Umino and Wheeler Yuta. At Blood and Guts on June 29, Guevara and The JAS were defeated by the Blackpool Combat Club, Santana and Ortiz, and Kingston in a Blood and Guts match. On August 12 on AEW Rampage Quake by the Lake Guevara teamed up with his wife Tay Melo to defend their AAA Mixed Tag Team Championship against Dante Martin and Skye Blue which they successfully retained.

After this, Guevara began a feud with Kingston. The two were scheduled to face in a match at the All Out, but the match was cancelled after Kingston was suspended by AEW for getting into a legitimate backstage dispute with Guevara. Instead, Guevara and Melo successfully defended the AAA Mixed Tag Team Championship against Ortiz and Ruby Soho. On November 19 at Full Gear, Guevara was unsuccessful at winning the ROH World Championship in a four-way match, which included Bryan Danielson, Claudio Castagnoli and Chris Jericho, who won the match.

In March 2023, Guevara competed in the Face of the Revolution ladder match, which was won by Powerhouse Hobbs. On the April 19, episode of Dynamite, Guevara defeated "Jungle Boy" Jack Perry by countout with assistance from MJF in the semi-final of the Four Pillars Tournament. The following week in the final, Guevara would again win with assistance from MJF, this time defeating Darby Allin via disqualification, however, Tony Khan stated that the singles match between MJF and Guevara at Double or Nothing would only go ahead if they could beat Perry and Darby in a tag team match; if Perry and Allin won, the World Championship match at Double or Nothing would be a four-way match between MJF, Guevara, Perry, and Allin. On the May 3 episode, Perry and Allin won. On May 28 at the event, Guevara was unsuccessful at winning the AEW World Championship, which was won by MJF. On June 25 at Forbidden Door, Guevara, Jericho and Minoru Suzuki, under the sub-unit of "Le Suzuki Gods", facing Darby Allin, Sting and Tetsuya Naito in a losing effort.

On the August 9, episode of Dynamite, Guevara along with the rest of the Jericho Appreciation Society held a mandatory meeting after Jericho began interacting with Don Callis, it led to each member walk out on Jericho with Guevara being open to returning if Jericho fixes the situation.

==== The Don Callis Family and Le Sex Gods (2023–2024) ====
On August 27 at All In, Guevara accompanied Chris Jericho to the ring in his match with Will Ospreay, Jericho ended up losing the match and walking away from Guevara after the match. At Grand Slam, Guevara was defeated by Jericho. Guevara, however turned heel and attacked Jericho with a low blow after the match, similarly, to what Jericho did after his WrestleMania XIX match against Shawn Michaels. Guevara would then leave with Don Callis, joining his family. On October 1 at WrestleDream, Guevara along with Ospreay and Konosuke Takeshita defeated Jericho and The Golden Elite (Kenny Omega and Kota Ibushi) in a six-man tag team match, with Guevara pinning Jericho with the help of Callis.

On the December 27 episode of Dynamite New Years Smash, Guevara returned to AEW as a face by confronting The Don Callis Family, before getting attacked by them. He would be saved by Jericho along with Sting and Darby Allin then came out to help Guevara and Jericho clear the ring. Later, an eight-man tag team match pitting the team of Jericho, Guevara, Sting, and Allin against the team of Ricky Starks, Big Bill, Powerhouse Hobbs, and Konosuke Takeshita was scheduled for Worlds End. At the event, Guevara, Jericho, Sting, and Allin defeated Starks, Bill, Hobbs and Takeshita. On the February 14th episode of Rampage, Guevara faced Jeff Hardy in a No Disqualification match, during the bout Hardy sustained a broken nose but managed to finish the contest. Guevara was suspended days later for not following concussion protocol during the match.

==== The Sons of Texas (2024–2025) ====
Guevara made his debut for AEW's sister promotion Ring of Honor (ROH) on the August 1 episode of Ring of Honor Wrestling, where he came to the aid of Dustin Rhodes, fending off an attack from The Dark Order. On the August 17 episode of AEW Collision, Guevara teamed with Rhodes to defeat The Undisputed Kingdom to win the ROH World Tag Team Championship for the first time. Guevara and Rhodes then formed a stable known as "The Sons of Texas" with Marshall and Ross Von Erich, who hold the ROH World Six-Man Tag Team Champions with Rhodes, explaining that they are all Texas natives and have connections to Texas wrestling legends (Rhodes and the Von Erichs through their respective families, and Guevara was trained by Rhodes' former WWE partner and Texas native Booker T). On December 20 at Final Battle, Guevera and Rhodes successfully defended their titles against The Righteous (Vincent and Dutch) in a Texas Bullrope match.

On January 5, 2025 at Wrestle Dynasty, Guevara and Rhodes successfully defended their titles against House of Torture's Sho and Yoshinobu Kanemaru. On May 25 at Double or Nothing, Guevara and Rhodes unsuccessfully challenged The Hurt Syndicate (Bobby Lashley and Shelton Benjamin) for the AEW World Tag Team Championship. On July 11 at Supercard of Honor, Guevara and Rhodes successfully defended their titles against The Infantry (Carlie Bravo and Shawn Dean). The next day at All In, Guevara competed in a four-way match for the vacant AEW TNT Championship, which was won by his tag team partner Dustin Rhodes.

==== La Facción Ingobernable (2025–present) ====
On August 29, Guevara and Rhodes were forced to vacate the ROH World Tag Team Championships due to Rhodes suffering an injury, ending their reign at 378 days. On the same day at Death Before Dishonor, Guevara teamed with Marshall and Ross Von Erich in a losing effort against Shane Taylor Promotions (Shane Taylor, Carlie Bravo, and Capt. Shawn Dean) for the vacant ROH World Six-Man Tag Team Championships. Later in the night, Guevara teamed with Rush to defeat The Outrunners (Turbo Floyd and Truth Magnum) to win the vacant ROH World Tag Team Championships. After the match, Guevara attacked Marshall and Ross Von Erich, turning heel and joining La Facción Ingobernable. On November 28, Guevara and Rush were forced to vacate their titles due to Rush suffering a knee injury, ending their reign at 91 days. On December 5 at Final Battle, Guevara and The Beast Mortos defeated Adam Priest and Tommy Billington to win the vacant titles, giving Guevara his third ROH World Tag Team Championship reign.

On May 16, 2026 episode of Collision, Guevera unsuccessfully challenged Darby Allin for the AEW World Championship in No Count-Out match. On June 26 at partner promotion CMLL's Viernes Espectaular event, Guvera and Mortos lost their titles to Místico and Máscara Dorada, ending their reign at 203 days.

=== Return to AAA (2022) ===
On April 30, 2022, Guevara returned to AAA teaming with Tay Conti to defeat Los Vipers, Maravilla and Látigo, and Sexy Star II and Komander to win the AAA World Mixed Tag Team Championship at Triplemanía XXX. For most of the match, La Parka Negra would wrestle in Guevara's place.

=== Consejo Mundial de Lucha Libre (2026–present) ===
Guever made his debut for Consejo Mundial de Lucha Libre (CMLL) on the June 5, 2026 episode of Viernes Espectaular, teaming with The Beast Mortos and Black Tiger in a losing effort against Barbaro Cavernario and Los Villanos (El Hijo del Villano III and Villano III Jr.). On the June 26 episode of Viernes Espectaular event, Guevara and Mortos lost their ROH World Tag Team Championship to Místico and Máscara Dorada.

== Personal life ==
On the August 18th, 2021 edition of AEW Dynamite, Guevara proposed to his longtime girlfriend from high school, Pam Nizio. In December, Guevara announced that they had amicably broken up in October.

Since November 2021, Guevara has been in a relationship with fellow professional wrestler Taynara Melo, better known by her ring name Tay Melo. In June 2022, Guevara announced his engagement to Melo. On August 6, 2022, Guevara and Melo held their wedding ceremony in Orlando.

On May 28, 2023, right before Guevara's match at AEW's Double or Nothing 2023, he and Melo announced they were expecting their first child.

On November 28, 2023, Guevara's wife Melo gave birth to their daughter Luna Guevara.

== Other media ==
Sammy Guevara

YouTube information
- Channel: sammy guevara
- Years active: 2009–present
- Genre: Vlogging
- Subscribers: 215 thousand
- Views: 37.7 million
- Last updated: 27 June 2026

Guevara has his own YouTube channel, which has over 215,000 subscribers as of 2026. He regularly uploads vlogs (video blogs) on the channel. Guevara featured in the AEW mobile game, "AEW Elite GM" in 2021. Notable vlogs of Guevara's include his trips to do shows for promotions outside North America, his initial adventures as a wrestler working for independent promotions around the United States, as well as his adventures traveling around the United States with his AEW co-workers. Guevara's friends and fellow AEW co-workers, such as Fuego Del Sol, Griff Garrison, Alan "5" Angels, Isiah Kassidy, Dustin Rhodes, Aaron Solow and wife Tay Melo make frequent appearances, and the vlogs, instead of sticking strictly to a visual diary format, now include specific fictional storylines between the aforementioned wrestling personalities.

== Filmography ==
=== Television ===
| Year | Title | Role | Notes |
|---|---|---|---|
| 2021 | Rhodes to the Top | Self | |
| Present | AEW All Access | | |

== Championships and accomplishments ==
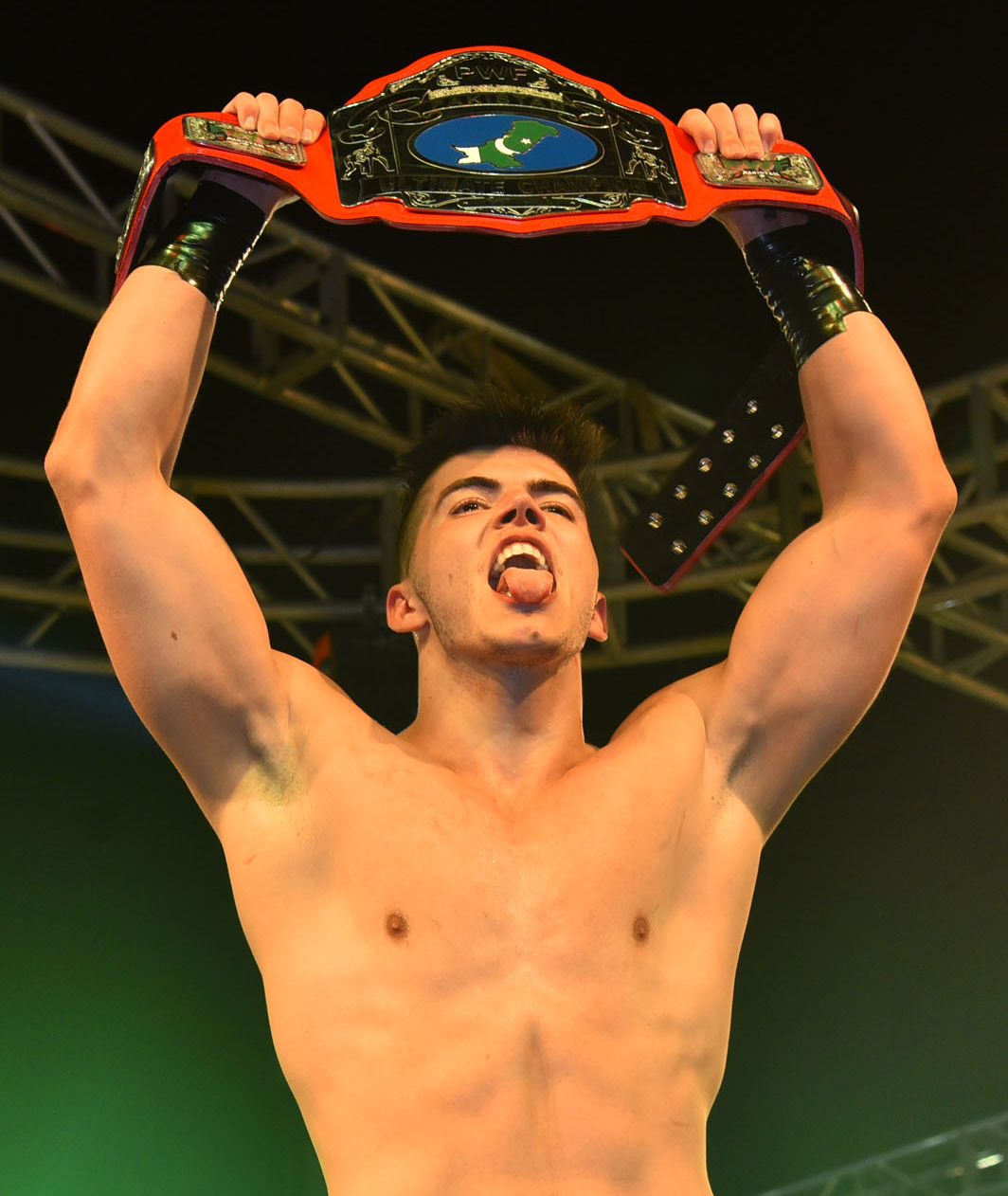
Guevara in April 2019 as the PWFP Ultimate Champion.

- All Elite Wrestling
  - AEW TNT Championship (3 times)
  - Interim AEW TNT Championship (1 time)
  - Dynamite Award (3 times)
    - "Bleacher Report PPV Moment of the Year" (2021) – Stadium Stampede match (The Elite vs. The Inner Circle) – Double or Nothing (May 23)
    - "Biggest Beatdown" (2021) - The Inner Circle jumping Orange Cassidy on Dynamite (June 10)
    - Breakout Star – Male (2022)
- Adrenaline Pro Wrestling
  - APW Gladiator Championship (1 time)
- CBS Sports
  - Worst Moment of the Year (2020) vs. Matt Hardy at All Out
- Inspire Pro Wrestling
  - Inspire Pro Junior Crown Championship (2 times)
  - Inspire Pro Pure Prestige Championship (1 time)
- Lucha Libre AAA Worldwide
  - AAA World Cruiserweight Championship (1 time)
  - AAA Mixed Tag Team Championship (1 time) - with Tay Conti/Tay Melo
- Pro Wrestling Federation of Pakistan
  - PWFP Ultimate Championship (1 time, final)
- Pro Wrestling Illustrated
  - Faction of the Year (2021) – with The Inner Circle
  - Ranked No. 28 of the top 500 singles wrestlers in the PWI 500 in 2022
- Ring of Honor
  - ROH World Tag Team Championship (3 times) – with Dustin Rhodes (1), Rush (1) and The Beast Mortos (1)
- River City Wrestling
  - RCW International Championship (2 times)
  - RCW Phoenix Championship (2 times)
- Total Championship Wrestling
  - TCW Cruiserweight Championship (1 time)
- WrestleCircus
  - WC Ringmaster Championship (1 time)
  - WC Sideshow Championship (1 time)
  - WC Ringmaster Championship Tournament (2019)
- Wrestling Association of Reynosa City
  - WAR City Heavyweight Championship (1 time)
- Xtreme Wrestling Alliance
  - XWA Heavyweight Championship (1 time)
  - Xtreme Rumble (2019)
- Other championships
  - Bull of the Woods Championship (1 time)
