= Jack Perry =

American professional wrestler (born 1997)

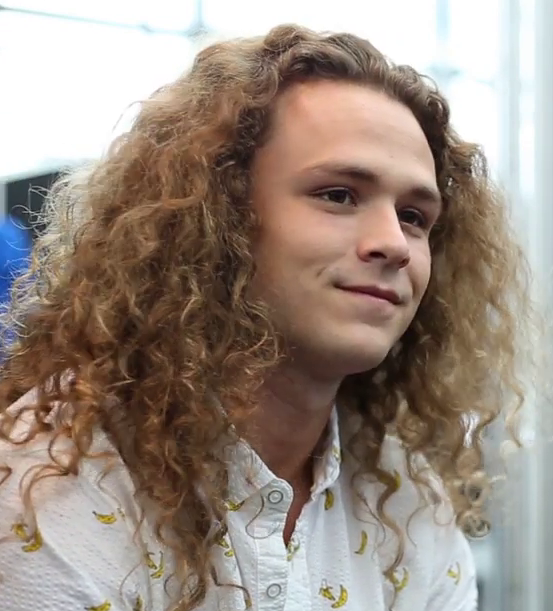
- Perry in 2019

Personal information
- Born: June 16, 1997 (age 29) Los Angeles, California, U.S.
- Life partners: Anna Jay (2020–present)
- Parent: Luke Perry (father)
- Relative: Alan Sharp (grandfather)

Professional wrestling career
- Ring name(s): Jack Perry; Johnny Drake; Jungle Boy; Nate Coy
- Billed height: 5 ft 10 in (178 cm)
- Billed weight: 167 lb (76 kg)
- Billed from: Valley Village
- Trained by: Santino Marella; Joey Janela
- Debut: November 20, 2015

Jack Perry (born June 16, 1997) is an American professional wrestler. He is signed to All Elite Wrestling (AEW), where he is a member of The Elite and one-half of Jurassic Express with Luchasaurus. He is also a former FTW Champion, AEW National Champion, AEW TNT Champion, and AEW World Tag Team Champion. He was previously known by his ring name Jungle Boy.

== Early life ==
Jack Perry was born on June 16, 1997, in Los Angeles, California. He is the son of actor Luke Perry (1966-2019) and Rachel Sharp. Perry's maternal grandfather was the Scottish novelist and screenwriter Alan Sharp.

Perry grew up as a fan of professional wrestling and attended WWE's 2009 SummerSlam pay-per-view event in Los Angeles with his father at the age of twelve.

== Professional wrestling career ==
=== Early career (2015–2019) ===
Perry started his career on the independent circuit in 2015 making his professional wrestling debut at Underground Empire Wrestling's, 2015 West Coast Cruiser Cup under the ring name Nate Coy. This is where he was given the name Jungle Boy when the crowd chanted it at him because of his similarities to Tarzan. On November 20, 2016, Coy won the 2016 West Coast Cruiser Cup. On August 17, 2018, Coy won the All Pro Wrestling Junior Heavyweight Championship, his first professional wrestling championship. He later lost it to Jake Atlas at the Bay Area Bash event on June 15, 2019. In February 2019, Jungle Boy formed a tag team with fellow independent wrestler Luchasaurus, dubbed "A Boy and His Dinosaur". In May 2019, Perry wrestled in a tribute match for his late father, defeating his father's friend, actor and former WCW World Heavyweight Champion David Arquette.

=== All Elite Wrestling (2019–present) ===
==== Jurassic Express (2019–2023) ====
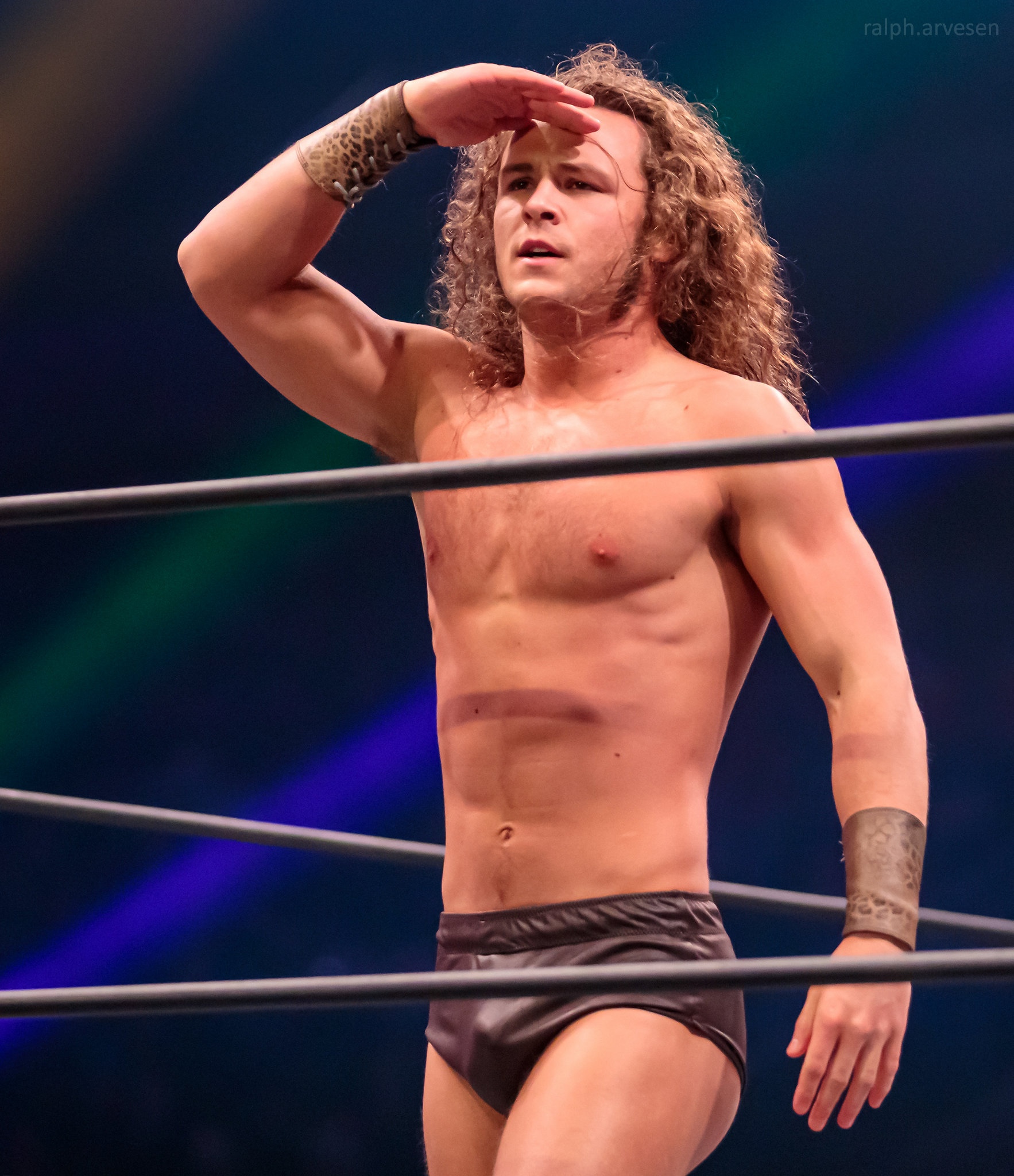
Jungle Boy in 2020

In January 2019, Perry signed with the upstart promotion All Elite Wrestling (AEW), under the Jungle Boy name. He made his AEW debut at the company's inaugural event Double or Nothing on May 25, competing in the pre-show Casino Battle Royale, but he was eliminated by Jimmy Havoc. The following month at Fyter Fest on June 29, Jungle Boy wrestled Havoc, Adam Page and MJF in a four-way match, which Page won. At Fight for the Fallen on July 13, Jungle Boy teamed with Luchasaurus against Angélico and Jack Evans and The Dark Order (Evil Uno and Stu Grayson) in a three-way tag team match, but The Dark Order won. Soon after, Jungle Boy and Luchasaurus allied themselves with Marko Stunt, creating a new faction dubbed the "Jurassic Express". At All Out on August 31, the Jurassic Express was defeated by SoCal Uncensored (Christopher Daniels, Frankie Kazarian and Scorpio Sky) in a six-man tag team match. In October, Jungle Boy and Stunt competed in a tournament to determine the inaugural AEW World Tag Team Champions, but they were eliminated by the Lucha Brothers (Pentagón Jr. and Rey Fénix).

On the November 20 episode of Dynamite, Jungle Boy competed in the Dynamite Dozen Battle Royale, but failed to win. On the December 4 episode of Dynamite, Jungle Boy was challenged by AEW World Champion Chris Jericho to last 10 minutes in the ring with him, which he successfully did on the December 18 episode of Dynamite. On the January 15, 2020 episode of Dark, Jungle Boy obtained his first victory in AEW, after the Jurassic Express defeated Strong Hearts (Cima, El Lindaman and T-Hawk). On the February 19 episode of Dynamite, Jungle Boy and Luchasaurus competed in a tag team battle royal to determine the number one contenders for the AEW World Tag Team Championship, but the match was won by The Young Bucks (Matt Jackson and Nick Jackson). At Double or Nothing on May 23, Jungle Boy was defeated by MJF. On September 5 at All Out, Jungle Boy and Luchasaurus were defeated by The Young Bucks. At Winter Is Coming on December 2, Jungle Boy entered the Dynamite Dozen Battle Royale for the second year in a row, but was eliminated by MJF.

At the Revolution event on March 7, 2021, Jungle Boy and Luchasaurus competed in the Casino Tag Team Royale, but were unsuccessful in winning the match. At Double or Nothing on May 30, Jungle Boy won the Casino Battle Royale by lastly eliminating Christian Cage, entitling him to a match for the AEW World Championship, which he received against Kenny Omega on the June 26 episode of Dynamite, but lost. On the All Out pre-show on September 5, Jungle Boy and Luchasaurus teamed with Best Friends (Orange Cassidy, Chuck Taylor, and Wheeler Yuta) to defeat the Hardy Family Office (Matt Hardy, Private Party (Isiah Kassidy and Marq Quen), and The Hybrid 2 (Angélico and Jack Evans)) in a 10-man tag team match. Later in the show, Jungle Boy, Luchasaurus and Stunt came to assist Cage after his main event match with Omega, but they were beaten down by Omega and his allies The Young Bucks, as well as the newly debuted Adam Cole. At Full Gear on November 13, Jungle Boy, Luchasaurus and Cage defeated The Young Bucks and Cole in a falls count anywhere match.

On the January 5, 2022 episode of Dynamite, Jungle Boy and Luchasaurus defeated the Lucha Brothers to win the AEW World Tag Team Championship. At the Revolution event on March 6, Jurassic Express successfully defended the championship against The Young Bucks and reDRagon (Bobby Fish and Kyle O'Reilly) in a three-way tag team match. At Double or Nothing on May 29, they retained the championship in a three-way tag match against Team Taz (Ricky Starks and Powerhouse Hobbs) and Swerve In Our Glory (Keith Lee and Swerve Strickland). However, at the Road Rager special event on June 15, Jurassic Express lost the tag team championship to The Young Bucks in a ladder match, ending their reign at 161 days. After the match, Jungle Boy was betrayed by his mentor Cage, who attacked him following the loss.

Jungle Boy initiated a rivalry with Cage, and the two faced each other in a match at All Out on September 4. At the event, Jungle Boy was defeated in 20 seconds, after Luchasaurus attacked him and allied himself with Cage. At the Full Gear event on November 19, Jungle Boy, now wrestling under his name as "Jungle Boy" Jack Perry, defeated Luchasaurus in a steel cage match. Perry began a short feud with The Firm, where he teamed with Hook, to defeat Lee Moriarty, Ethan Page and Big Bill in various tag team matches. On the February 15, 2023 episode of Dynamite, Cage, who had been out with an arm injury since All Out, returned attacking Jungle Boy, renewing their rivalry. At Revolution on March 5, Jungle Boy defeated Cage in a Final Burial match ending their feud.

==== FTW Champion and suspension (2023–2024) ====
After feuding with Cage, Perry entered the AEW World Championship picture and unsuccessfully challenged for the belt in a fatal four way at Double or Nothing on May 28 that included then-Champion MJF, Sammy Guevara and Darby Allin.

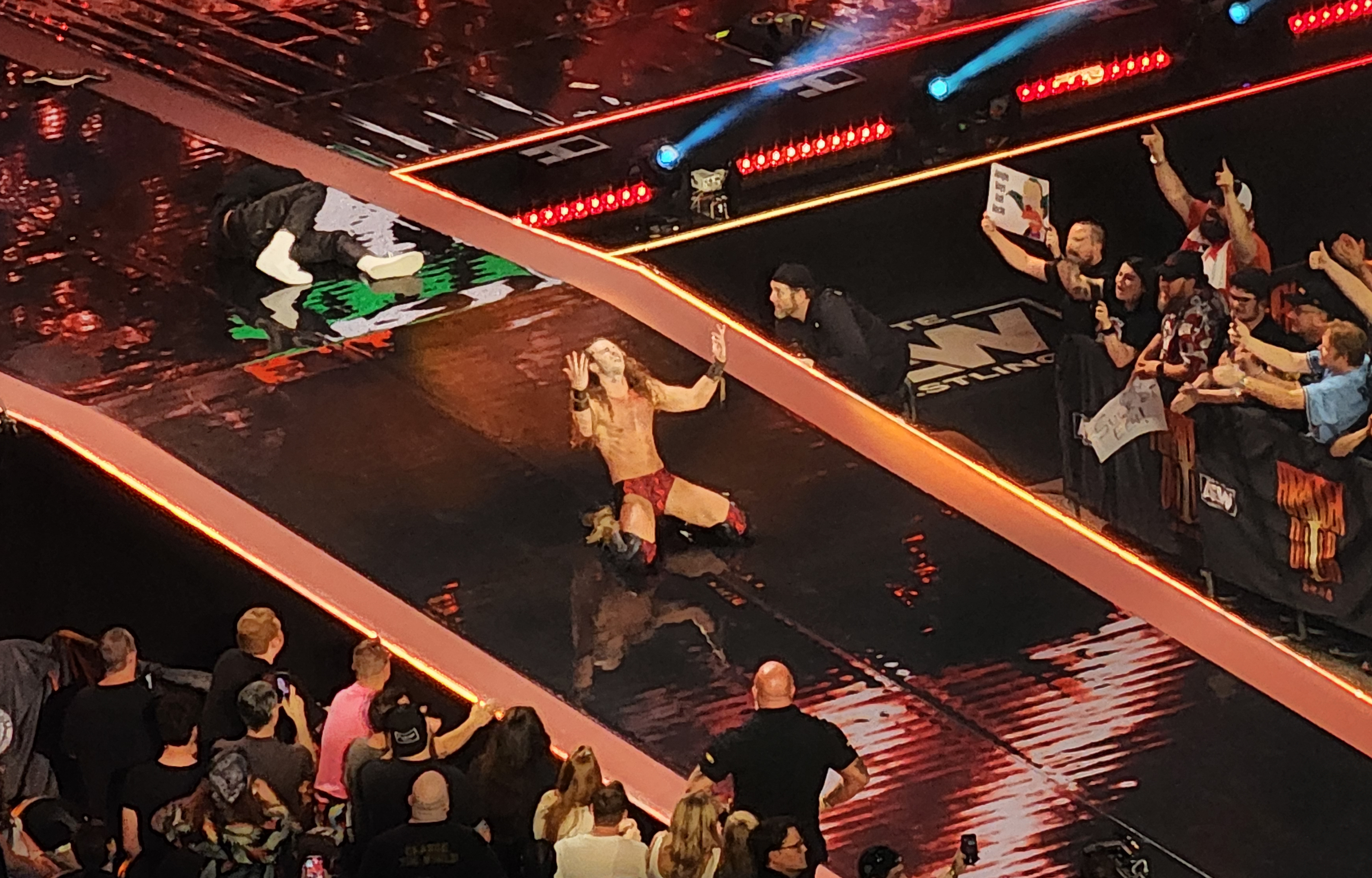
Perry after turning on Hook at Forbidden Door in June 2023

On June 25, at Forbidden Door, Perry faced Sanada for the IWGP World Heavyweight Championship in which he lost. After the match, Perry attacked Hook, turning heel as well as dropping the Jungle Boy persona and only going by his real name. On July 19 at Dynamite: Blood & Guts, Perry defeated Hook for the FTW Championship, claiming both his first singles title and Hook's undefeated streak, becoming the first man to defeat Hook since he began his career in 2021. At All In Zero Hour on August 27, Perry was defeated by Hook, losing the FTW Championship and ending his reign at 39 days. During the match, Perry knocked on the windshield of a car and said "You know what this is right here? Real glass! Go cry me a river." into the camera. This was allegedly a response to CM Punk leaking a story about Punk refusing to allow Perry to use real glass for a spot in a planned segment for Perry for an episode of Collision. After the match, Perry and Punk got into a legitimate altercation right before Punk's match which had to be broken up by Punk's opponent, Samoa Joe. A week later, AEW owner Tony Khan terminated Punk's contract and suspended Perry indefinitely. Footage of the altercation was shown on the April 10, 2024 episode of Dynamite. Later, footage of the incident was presented by The Young Bucks to further their feud with FTR (Cash Wheeler and Dax Harwood)—who are real-life friends with Punk—prior to their match at Dynasty on April 21. The Young Bucks stated the altercation was the reason they lost their match to FTR at All In and that FTR were the masterminds behind the incident, verbalizing their support for Perry.

==== The Elite (2024–2025) ====
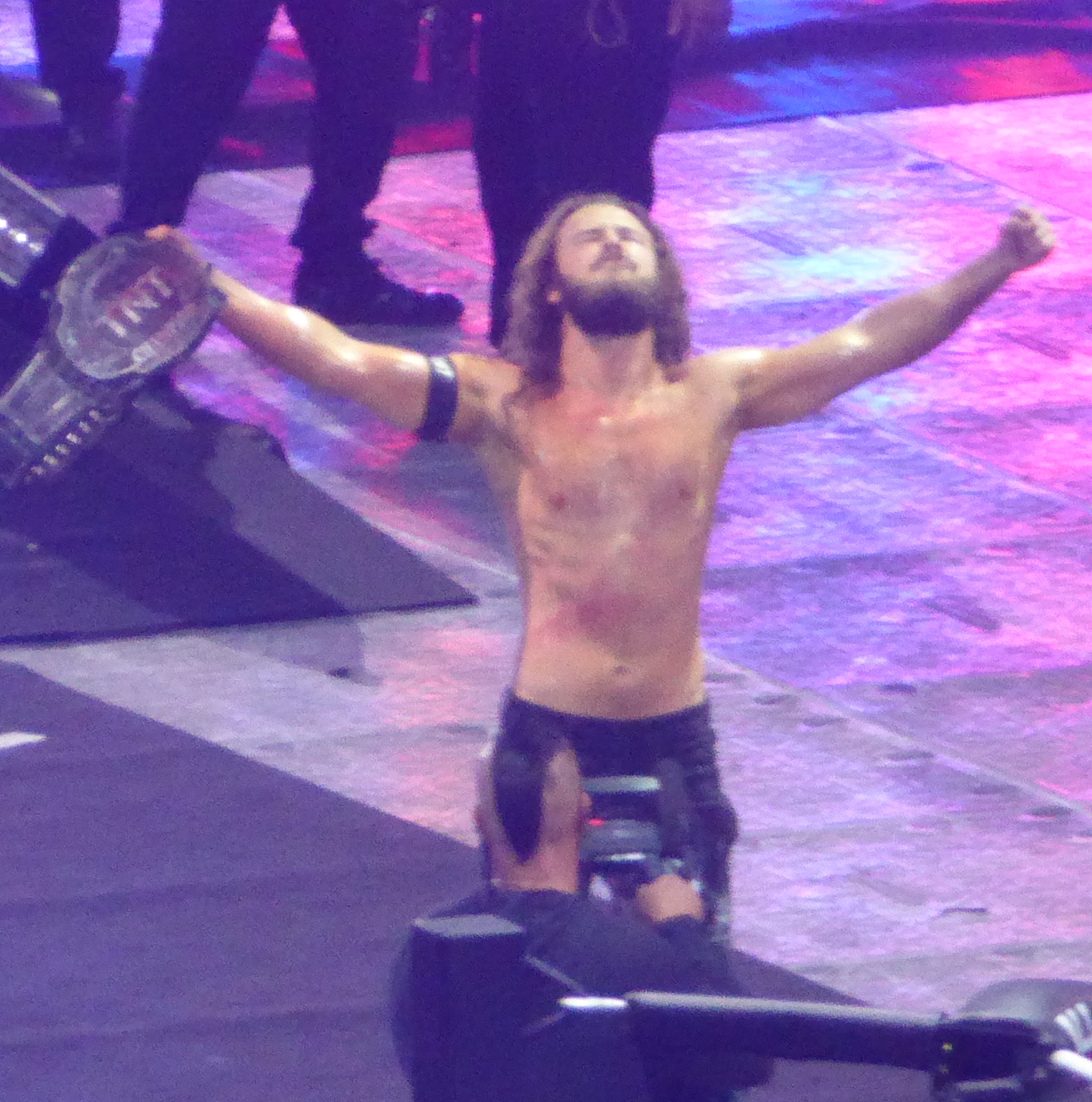
Perry celebrating after successfully defending his AEW TNT Championship at All In in August 2024

On April 21, 2024, Perry, with his new "Scapegoat" persona, returned to AEW at Dynasty and helped the Young Bucks defeat FTR to win the AEW World Tag Team Championship. On the April 24 episode of Dynamite, Perry was revealed as a member of The Elite alongside the Young Bucks and Kazuchika Okada. At the end of the episode, Perry and the rest of The Elite attacked AEW President and CEO Tony Khan. At Double or Nothing on May 26, The Elite defeated Team AEW (Bryan Danielson, Darby Allin and FTR) in an Anarchy in the Arena match, where Perry scored the winning pin on Danielson.

On the June 12 episode of Dynamite, Perry defeated Dustin Rhodes to qualify for a ladder match for the vacant AEW TNT Championship at Forbidden Door on June 30. At Forbidden Door, Perry was able to win the ladder match and capture the TNT Championship for the first time. As TNT Champion, Perry would defend his title on Dynamite and Collision in a series of open challenges, successfully defending it against Marko Stunt, Lio Rush, Christopher Daniels, Minoru Suzuki, and Action Andretti. At Blood & Guts, The Elite were defeated by Team AEW (Allin, Swerve Strickland, Mark Briscoe and The Acclaimed (Max Caster and Anthony Bowens)) after Matthew Jackson surrendered to save Perry from being set on fire by Allin. On the August 17 episode of Collision, Perry unveiled his custom TNT Championship belt, featuring the default design but completely spray painted black with red paint splattered on the main plate (mimicking blood) and a warped and tattered leather strap. At All In, Perry successfully defended his TNT Championship against Allin in a coffin match. On the following episode of Dynamite, Perry attacked Danielson, then-AEW World Champion, and challenged him to a match for the championship at All Out, which Perry lost. On October 12 at WrestleDream, Perry successfully defended his title against Katsuyori Shibata. On November 23 at Full Gear, Perry lost the TNT Championship to Daniel Garcia, ending his reign at 146 days. After Full Gear, Perry remained off of AEW television for the remainder of 2024 and the majority of 2025.

==== Jurassic Express reunion (2025–present) ====
After a ten-month absence, Perry returned at All Out on September 20, 2025, where he attacked The Young Bucks and reformed Jurassic Express with Luchasaurus, turning face for the first time since 2023 and leaving The Elite. After returning, he began wrestling with the epithet "Jungle" Jack Perry. On October 18 at WrestleDream, Jurassic Express defeated The Young Bucks. At Full Gear on November 22, Jurassic Express teamed with Kenny Omega, losing to the Young Bucks and Josh Alexander; post-match, Alexander and the Don Callis Family (Rocky Romero, Mark Davis, El Clon and Hechicero) attacked Omega and Jurassic Express until the Young Bucks returned to aid them. After fending off the Don Callis Family, Jurassic Express and The Young Bucks shook hands, signaling the end of their feud. On the December 6 episode of Collision, Perry was announced as an alternate in the Gold League of the 2025 Continental Classic, replacing the injured Darby Allin. Perry finished the tournament with 6 points, but failed advanced to the semi-finals. On December 31 at Dynamite: New Year's Smash, Perry unsuccessfully challenged Ricochet for the AEW National Championship. After the match, Luchasaurus was attacked by The Demand (Ricochet, Bishop Kaun, and Toa Liona) This was done to write him off television as he had suffered a legitmate shoulder injury and would miss some time, leaving Perry as a singles wrestler.

On March 15, 2026 at Revolution, Perry won a 21-man Blackjack Battle Royal to win the National Championship. On April 12 on the Zero Hour pre-show of Dynasty, Perry successfully defended his title against Mark Davis. On May 9 at Fairway to Hell, Perry lost the title to Davis due to interference from Ricochet, ending his reign at 55 days. In the same month, Perry quietly rejoined The Elite and was on Jericho's team in Stadium Stampede to defeat Ricochet's team at Double or Nothing on May 24. In September 2026, Perry announced his intentions to become AEW World Champion and began calling out former two-time champion Samoa Joe. Perry would go on to defeat Joe's stablemate in the Opps, Katsuyori Shibata on September 26 at the Saturday Tailgate Brawl edition of All Out before being attacked by a returning Joe afterwards. On October 6 at Grand Slam France, Perry was defeated by Joe in a Clockwork Carnage qualifying match.

=== New Japan Pro-Wrestling (2024–2025) ===
On January 13, 2024, at Battle in the Valley, Perry made his New Japan Pro-Wrestling (NJPW) debut, where he attacked Shota Umino; after laying Umino out, he tore up his AEW contract in the ring and donned an armband reading "scapegoat". On February 26, Perry was announced as a participant in the 2024 New Japan Cup. On March 6, Perry made his NJPW in-ring debut, defeating Umino in the first round of the New Japan Cup with the help of House of Torture. After the match, Perry would accept House of Torture's offer to join the group. Perry would be eliminated in the quarter-final of the New Japan Cup by Sanada, in a rematch from Forbidden Door. On April 12 at Windy City Riot, Perry was defeated by Umino in a rematch. After the match, the two shook hands and hugged, showing their mutual respect. On May 11 at Resurgence, Perry teamed with fellow House of Torture members Evil and Ren Narita, in a winning effort against Tomohiro Ishii, Rocky Romero and The DKC. Later in the show, Perry along with The Young Bucks attacked Eddie Kingston, whom The Elite was feuding with in AEW.

On November 8 at Fighting Spirit Unleashed, Perry returned to NJPW, where he attacked Yota Tsuji and challenged him to a match on January 5, 2025 at Wrestle Dynasty. At the event, Perry unsuccessfully challenged Tsuji for the IWGP Global Heavyweight Championship.

== Professional wrestling style and persona ==
Perry's Jungle Boy character was described as a "Tarzan-esque character, complete with his mane of long curls, loin cloth-like shorts and a heavy dose of leopard print." Perry originally thought the gimmick was "really dumb", but changed his mind after seeing "how people liked it". He used the 1985 song "Tarzan Boy" by Baltimora as his entrance music.

After turning heel and dropping the "Jungle Boy" gimmick, Perry debuted new entrance music on July 19, 2023: the first movement of Ludwig van Beethoven's Symphony No. 5. He reverted back to using "Tarzan Boy" when he turned face in September 2025.

From February 2024 to January 2025, Perry wrestled with an epithet the "Scapegoat" in reference of the punishment he received from getting into legitimate backstage altercation with CM Punk, and would occasionally wear a black goat mask during his entrance.

As a finisher, Perry uses a cross-legged STF named the Snare Trap and a variation of the running single leg high knee named the Glass Jaw.

== Personal life ==
As of June 2021, Perry is in a relationship with fellow wrestler Anna Jay.

== Championships and accomplishments ==
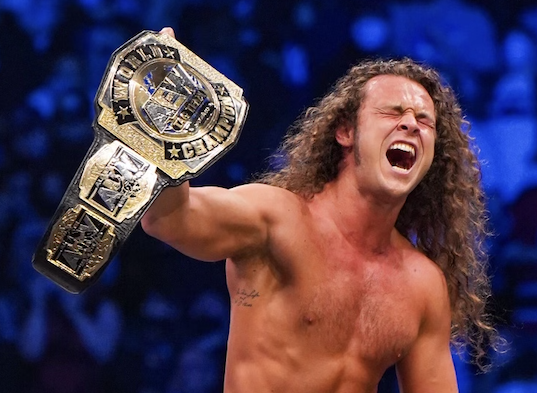
Perry is a one-time AEW World Tag Team Champion...

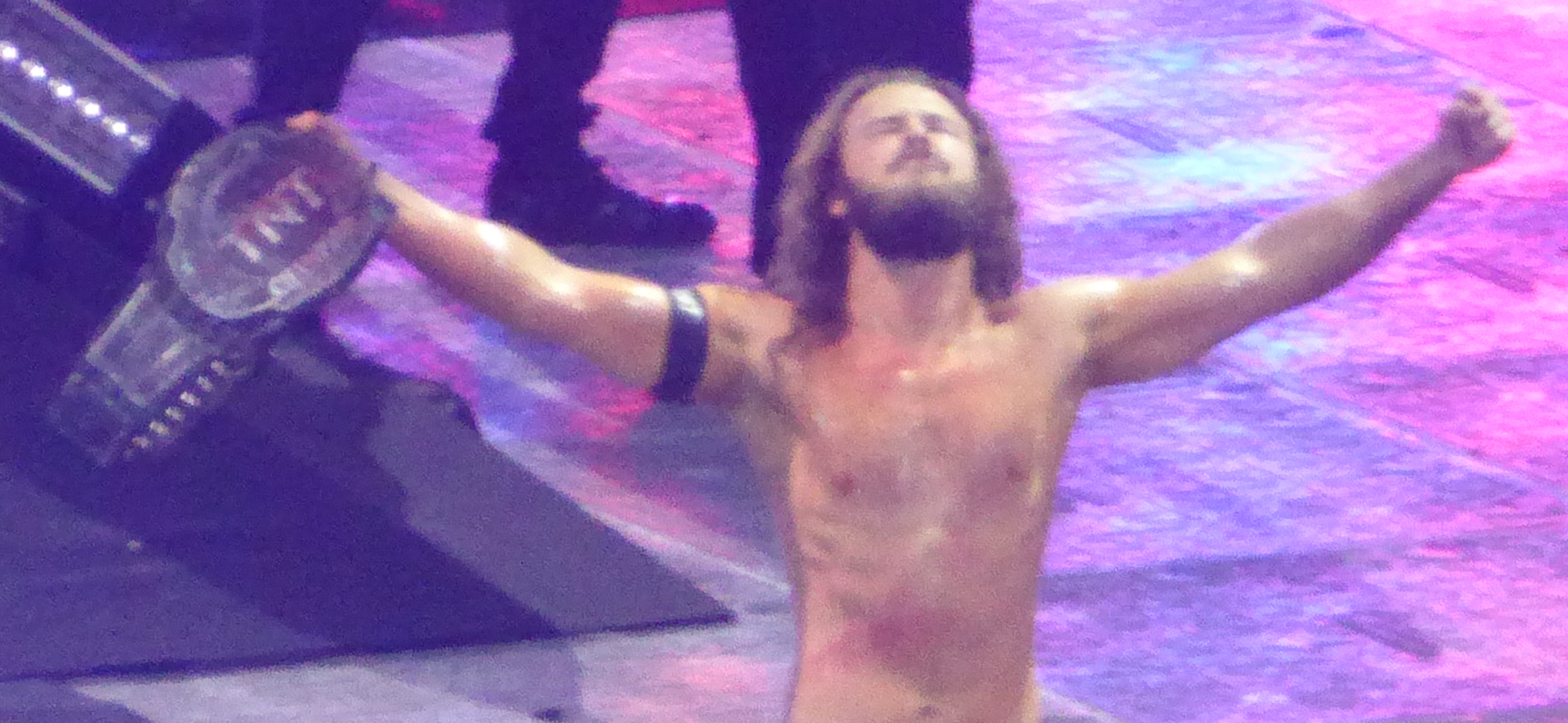
... and is a one-time AEW TNT Champion

- All Elite Wrestling
  - AEW TNT Championship (1 time)
  - AEW National Championship (1 time)
  - AEW World Tag Team Championship (1 time) – with Luchasaurus
  - FTW Championship (1 time)
  - Men's Casino Battle Royale (2021)
- All Pro Wrestling
  - APW Junior Heavyweight Championship (1 time)
- Revolution Eastern Wrestling
  - REW Pakistan 24/7 Championship (1 time)
- DDT Pro-Wrestling
  - Ironman Heavymetalweight Championship (1 time)
- ESPN
  - Ranked No. 13 of the 30 best Pro Wrestlers Under 30 in 2023
- Pro Wrestling Illustrated
  - Ranked No. 59 of the top 500 singles wrestlers in the PWI 500 in 2024
- Pro Wrestling Revolution
  - PWR Tag Team Championships (1 time) – with El Prostipirugolfo
- Underground Empire Wrestling
  - West Coast Cruiser Cup (2016)
- Wrestling Observer Newsletter
  - Rookie of the Year (2019)
