= AEW World Tag Team Championship =

Men's professional wrestling championship

- The AEW World Tag Team Championship belts

Details
- Promotion: All Elite Wrestling
- Date established: October 30, 2019
- Current champions: The Young Bucks (Matt Jackson and Nick Jackson)
- Date won: September 26, 2026
Statistics
- First champions: SoCal Uncensored (Frankie Kazarian and Scorpio Sky)
- Most reigns: As tag team (4 reigns): The Young Bucks (Matt/Matthew Jackson and Nick/Nicholas Jackson); As individual (4 reigns): Matt/Matthew Jackson; Nick/Nicholas Jackson
- Longest reign: The Young Bucks (Matt/Matthew Jackson and Nick/Nicholas Jackson) (1st reign, 302 days)
- Shortest reign: Sting and Darby Allin (25 days)
- Oldest champion: Sting (64 years, 324 days)
- Youngest champion: Jungle Boy (24 years, 203 days)
- Heaviest champion: Swerve In Our Glory (Keith Lee and Swerve Strickland) (541 lbs combined)
- Lightest champion: The Young Bucks (Matt/Matthew Jackson and Nick/Nicholas Jackson) (350 lbs combined)

The AEW World Tag Team Championship is a men's professional wrestling world tag team championship created and promoted by the American promotion All Elite Wrestling (AEW). It is a standard tag team championship, being contested by teams of two wrestlers. Established on October 30, 2019, the inaugural champions were SoCal Uncensored (Frankie Kazarian and Scorpio Sky). The reigning champions are The Young Bucks (Matt Jackson and Nick Jackson), who are in their record-setting fourth reign, both as a team and individually. They won the title by defeating previous champions Cage and Cope (Christian Cage and Adam Copeland) and FTR (Dax Harwood and Cash Wheeler) in a Three-way ladder match at All Out on September 26, 2026.

== History ==
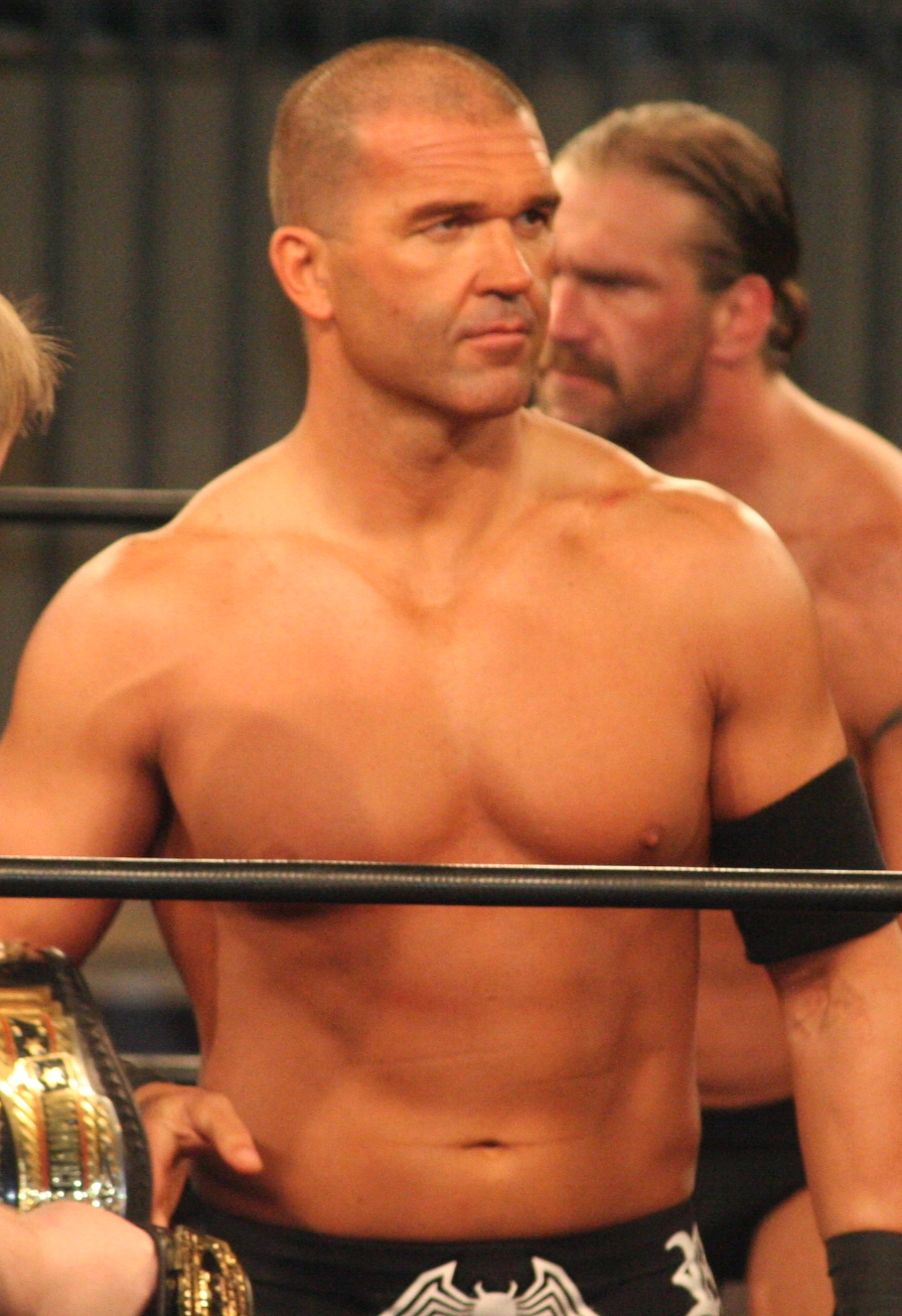
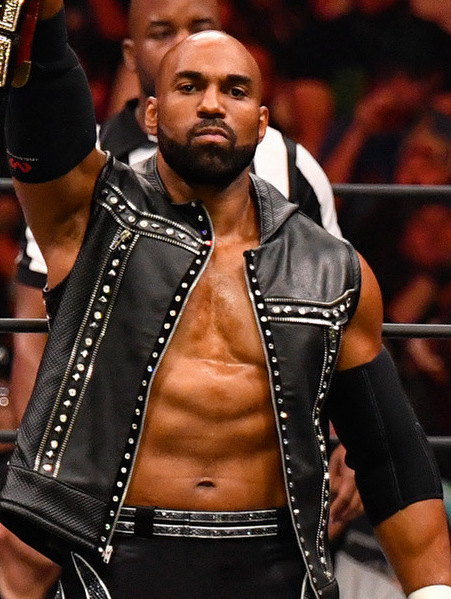
Inaugural champions SoCal Uncensored (Frankie Kazarian and Scorpio Sky)

On June 18, 2019, six months after the American professional wrestling promotion All Elite Wrestling (AEW) was founded, a tournament was announced to crown the promotion's inaugural men's tag team champions. That same day, a three-way tag team match for AEW's event Fyter Fest on June 29 was scheduled, featuring Best Friends (Trent? and Chuck Taylor), SoCal Uncensored (Frankie Kazarian and Scorpio Sky), and Private Party (Marq Quen and Isiah Kassidy) with the winning team advancing to All Out for an opportunity at a first round bye in the AEW World Tag Team Championship tournament. Later, AEW's president and chief executive officer Tony Khan announced that the tournament would occur on episodes of their TNT show, later revealed as Dynamite. During the Buy In pre-show of Fyter Fest, Best Friends defeated Private Party and SoCal Uncensored to earn their spot at All Out.

On July 11, AEW's Executive Vice President and wrestler Matt Jackson announced a second three-way tag team match to take place at Fight for the Fallen on July 13 with the winners facing Best Friends at All Out. At Fight for the Fallen, The Dark Order (Evil Uno and Stu Grayson) defeated Jurassic Express (Jungle Boy and Luchasaurus) and Angélico and Jack Evans to advance to All Out. At the event on August 31, The Dark Order defeated Best Friends to receive the first round bye in the tournament. In the tournament final on the October 30 episode of Dynamite, SoCal Uncensored defeated The Lucha Brothers (Pentagón Jr. and Rey Fénix) to become the inaugural champions.

=== Inaugural tournament ===
The first official match of the AEW World Tag Team Championship Tournament was announced on August 9, 2019, with The Young Bucks (Matt Jackson and Nick Jackson) facing Private Party (Marq Quen and Isiah Kassidy) on October 9 during the second episode of Dynamite in Boston, Massachusetts. It was later announced that the semifinals for the tournament would take place on the October 23 episode in Pittsburgh, Pennsylvania, with the final on the October 30 episode in Charleston, West Virginia.

1st Round; Dynamite; October 9–16, 2019
The Young Bucks (Matt Jackson and Nick Jackson)	13:39
Private Party (Marq Quen and Isiah Kassidy)	Pinfall
The Lucha Brothers (Pentagón Jr. and Rey Fénix)	Pinfall
Jurassic Express (Note: Stunt replaced Luchasaurus due to a hamstring injury.) (Jungle Boy and Marko Stunt)	11:31
Best Friends (Trent? and Chuck Taylor)	9:57
SoCal Uncensored (Note: Sky replaced Christopher Daniels after he was injured in an attack by The Lucha Brothers prior to the match.) (Frankie Kazarian and Scorpio Sky)	Pinfall

Semifinals; Dynamite; October 23, 2019
Private Party	12:24
The Lucha Brothers	Pinfall
SoCal Uncensored	Pinfall
The Dark Order (Note: The Dark Order defeated Best Friends (Trent? and Chuck Taylor) at All Out to receive a first round bye.) (Evil Uno and Stu Grayson)	13:59

Final; Dynamite; October 30, 2019
The Lucha Brothers	12:36
SoCal Uncensored	Pinfall

== Belt design ==
The AEW World Tag Team Championship belts were designed by Ron Edwardsen of Red Leather Belts. They have five gold plates on a black leather strap. The center plate has a blue globe at its center. At the center of the globe is AEW's logo, below the logo is a black banner that says "TAG TEAM" in gold, and below that is a nameplate for the reigning champions. Above the globe is a black banner that says "WORLD" in gold and below the globe is another black banner that says "CHAMPION" in gold. On either side of the center plate are two side plates each that each prominently display AEW's logo. The inner side plates additionally have a wrestler performing a piledriver while the outer side plates show a wrestler performing a standing choke hold. After FTR (Dax Harwood and Cash Wheeler) first won the title in September 2020, the belts received a minor update with a relief AEW logo on the center plate. In 2026, the belts received another update. The side plates were changed. The sideplates now feature smaller AEW logos, with focus on graphics depicting The Young Bucks performing the "Meltzer Driver", and FTR hitting the "Big Rig".

== Reigns ==
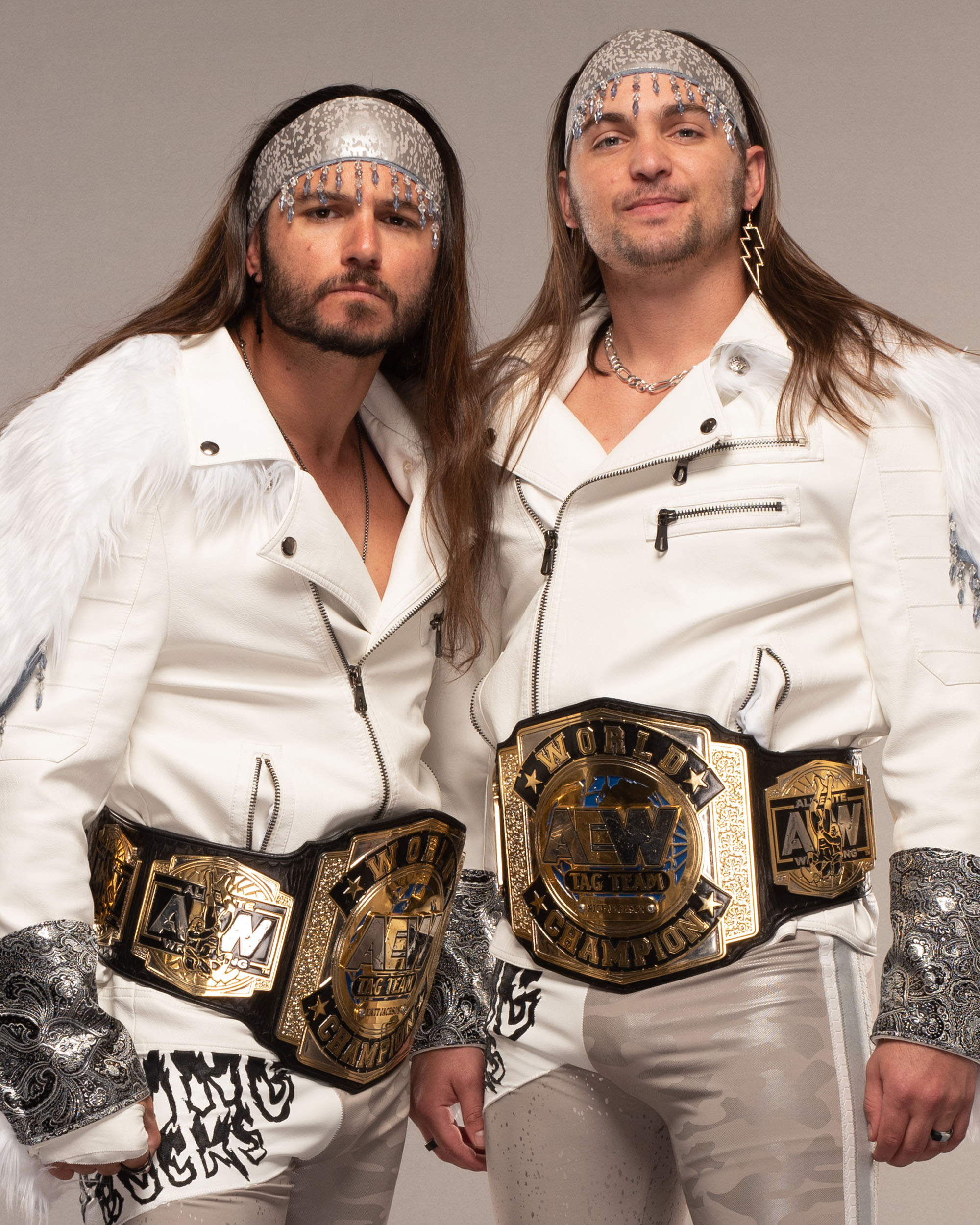
Current and record four-time champions The Young Bucks (Nick Jackson and Matt Jackson)

As of October 29, 2026, there have been 20 reigns between 15 teams composed of 30 individual champions and one vacancy. The Young Bucks (Matt/Matthew Jackson and Nick/Nicholas Jackson) have the most reigns at four, both as a team and individually. The Young Bucks are also the longest reigning champions for their first reign, which lasted 302 days, and they have the longest combined reign at 522 days. Sting and Darby Allin have the shortest reign at 25 days as they vacated the title due to Sting's retirement. Sting is also the oldest champion at 64 while Jungle Boy is the youngest at 24.

The Young Bucks (Matt Jackson and Nick Jackson) are the current champions in their record-setting fourth reign, both as a team and individually. They won the title by defeating Cage and Cope (Christian Cage and Adam Copeland) and FTR (Dax Harwood and Cash Wheeler) in a Three-way ladder match at All Out on September 26, 2026, in Hoffman Estates, Illinois.
