= AEW Fight for the Fallen =

All Elite Wrestling special event series

- The original AEW Fight for the Fallen logo (2019–2023)
- Promotions: All Elite Wrestling
- First event: 2019
- Event gimmick: Charity event

AEW Fight for the Fallen is a professional wrestling event produced by All Elite Wrestling (AEW). Established in 2019, it is held as a charity event for different causes, which is a reference to the event's title. These events have helped raise money to support victims of different types of violence, people affected by the COVID-19 pandemic, and various other non-profit organizations and natural disaster relief. Since 2020, Fight for the Fallen has been held as a television special of AEW's weekly television programs. The event was originally held during the summer in July but was pushed back to August in 2023. An event was not held in 2024 but returned on New Year's Day in 2025.

The inaugural event was streamed for free on B/R Live in North America and aired on pay-per-view internationally. The second iteration of the event aired as a special episode of Wednesday Night Dynamite, which started its broadcasting format as a television special. In 2022, the event expanded to a two-part special, also encompassing Friday Night Rampage, and then expanded to a three-part event in 2023 to also include Saturday Night Collision. It was reduced back to a one-night special of Dynamite in 2025. The 2025 event was also notable as it was the start of AEW's programs being simulcast on their respective television channels and on the streaming service Max.

== History ==
The inaugural Fight for the Fallen took place on July 13, 2019, at Daily's Place in Jacksonville, Florida and was All Elite Wrestling's (AEW) third-ever professional wrestling event. The company held the charity event to support victims of gun violence, with all gate receipts from the event being donated to these victims. The event was titled as a reference to this cause. In North America, the event was livestreamed for free on B/R Live, while internationally, it aired on pay-per-view.

The following year, AEW held a second Fight for the Fallen event, this time as a special episode of their flagship television program, Dynamite, which aired on TNT on July 15, 2020. It was also broadcast from Daily's Place, but this time, it was due to the COVID-19 pandemic that began in March that year, which forced the majority of AEW's programs to be held at Daily's Place. This second iteration in turn raised money for COVID-19 relief.

The 2021 event was announced to also broadcast as a television special of Dynamite, thus becoming the broadcasting format for Fight for the Fallen. It was also the first Fight for the Fallen to be held outside of Daily's Place. Following AEW's return to live touring during the COVID-19 pandemic, the 2021 event was held on July 28 at the Bojangles Coliseum in Charlotte, North Carolina and was the final event in AEW's "Welcome Back" tour. The 2021 event's charitable cause raised money to support victims of domestic violence and sexual assault survivors.

In August 2021, AEW launched a secondary television program titled Rampage, which aired on Friday nights on TNT. In turn, the 2022 Fight for the Fallen was expanded to a two-part event, encompassing the broadcasts of Dynamite, which moved to TBS in January that year, and Rampage. Dynamite aired live on July 27 while Rampage was taped the same night but aired on tape delay on July 29. This year's event supported Oceana, a non-profit marine wildlife organization.

In response to the Hawaii wildfires that occurred in early August 2023, AEW president Tony Khan announced that the 2023 Fight for the Fallen would be held as a three-part event, encompassing the August 16 episode of Dynamite, the August 18 episode of Rampage, and the August 19 episode of Collision, a third television program that launched in June that year, airing on Saturday nights on TNT. Proceeds from the event went to the Maui Food Bank.

An event was not held in 2024, but it returned in 2025 as a one-night special of Dynamite, which was pushed up to be held on New Year's Day in Asheville, North Carolina. The event benefited victims of Hurricane Helene, which severely impacted the Asheville area in September 2024. Following the cancellation of Rampage, the 2025 event served as the launch of Dynamite and Collision being simulcast on the streaming service Max and their respective TV channels (TBS and TNT).

== Events ==
#	Event	Date	City	Venue	Main event	Charity	Ref.
1	Fight for the Fallen (2019)	July 13, 2019	Jacksonville, Florida	Daily's Place	The Brotherhood (Cody and Dustin Rhodes) vs. The Young Bucks (Matt Jackson and Nick Jackson)	Victims of gun violence	
2	Fight for the Fallen (2020)	Dynamite: July 15, 2020	Jacksonville, Florida	Daily's Place	Jon Moxley (c) vs. Brian Cage for the AEW World Championship	COVID-19 relief	
3	Fight for the Fallen (2021)	Dynamite: July 28, 2021	Charlotte, North Carolina	Bojangles Coliseum	"The Painmaker" Chris Jericho vs. Nick Gage in a No Rules match	Victims of domestic violence and sexual assault survivors	
4	Fight for the Fallen (2022)	Night 1: Dynamite – July 27, 2022	Worcester, Massachusetts	DCU Center	Bryan Danielson vs. Daniel Garcia	Oceana to help support marine life and oceans around the world	
4	Fight for the Fallen (2022)	Night 2: Rampage – July 27, 2022 (aired July 29)	Worcester, Massachusetts	DCU Center	Anna Jay vs. Ruby Soho	Oceana to help support marine life and oceans around the world	
5	Fight for the Fallen (2023)	Night 1: Dynamite – August 16, 2023	Nashville, Tennessee	Bridgestone Arena	The Young Bucks (Matt Jackson and Nick Jackson) vs. The Gunns (Austin Gunn and Colten Gunn)	Maui Food Bank due to the 2023 Hawaii wildfires	
5	Fight for the Fallen (2023)	Night 2: Rampage – August 16, 2023 (aired August 18)	Nashville, Tennessee	Bridgestone Arena	Hikaru Shida and Skye Blue vs. The Outcasts (Ruby Soho and Toni Storm)	Maui Food Bank due to the 2023 Hawaii wildfires	
5	Fight for the Fallen (2023)	Night 3: Collison – August 19, 2023	Lexington, Kentucky	Rupp Arena	Darby Allin vs. Christian Cage	Maui Food Bank due to the 2023 Hawaii wildfires	
6	Fight for the Fallen (2025)	Dynamite: January 1, 2025	Asheville, North Carolina	Harrah's Cherokee Center	Rated FTR (Cope, Cash Wheeler, and Dax Harwood) vs. Death Riders (Jon Moxley, Claudio Castagnoli, and Wheeler Yuta)	Victims of Hurricane Helene	
(c) – refers to the champion(s) heading into the match
