= Blood & Guts (2021) =

All Elite Wrestling television special

- Promotional poster featuring The Pinnacle and The Inner Circle
- Promotion: All Elite Wrestling
- Date: May 5, 2021
- City: Jacksonville, Florida
- Venue: Daily's Place
- Attendance: 1,600 (Note: The capacity at the venue was capped at 40–50% due to the COVID-19 pandemic in the United States. Attendees were seated in pods with physical distancing in place.)

Blood & Guts chronology
← Previous; First	Next → 2022

AEW Dynamite special episodes chronology
← Previous; St. Patrick's Day Slam	Next → Road Rager

The 2021 Blood & Guts was the inaugural Blood & Guts professional wrestling television special produced by All Elite Wrestling (AEW). The event aired on May 5, 2021, and took place at Daily's Place in Jacksonville, Florida. It was broadcast on TNT as a special episode of AEW's weekly television program, Dynamite. The event was previously scheduled to be held in March 2020 at the Prudential Center in Newark, New Jersey, but it was postponed for over a year due to the COVID-19 pandemic.

In the main event, The Pinnacle (MJF, Wardlow, Shawn Spears, Cash Wheeler, and Dax Harwood) defeated The Inner Circle (Chris Jericho, Jake Hager, Sammy Guevara, Santana, and Ortiz) in a Blood and Guts match. While the main event aired live, the first hour of the episode was pre-taped.

== Production ==
Other on-screen personnel
Role	Name
Commentators	Jim Ross
Commentators	Excalibur
Commentators	Tony Schiavone
Spanish commentators	Alex Abrahantes
Spanish commentators	Dasha Gonzalez
Spanish commentators	Willie Urbina
Spanish commentators	Thunder Rosa
Ring announcer	Justin Roberts
Referees	Aubrey Edwards
Referees	Bryce Remsburg
Referees	Paul Turner
Referees	Rick Knox
Interviewer	Alex Marvez

=== Background ===
On July 25, 2019, World Wrestling Entertainment, Inc. (WWE), as a publicly traded company, conducted a conference call to announce its second-quarter fiscal year 2019 results. During the call, Eric Katz of Wolfe Research, LLC, asked WWE Chairman and Chief Executive Officer (CEO) Vince McMahon questions regarding naming Eric Bischoff and Paul Heyman as Executive Directors to WWE and its relationship to the future of WWE content, especially with stricter Broadcast Standards and Practices at the Fox network for SmackDown's upcoming move to broadcast television. McMahon responded to Katz's question:

We're going to be a bit edgier, but still remain in the PG environment. We just haven't come anywhere close actually to going into another level. So that will be something we'll do in terms of direction of content, more controversy, better storylines, et cetera. But at the same time, we're not going to go back to the Attitude Era, and we're not going to do blood and guts and things of that nature such as being done on perhaps a new potential competitor. We're just not going to go back to that gory crap that we graduated from. And again, a more sophisticated product, again, attracting much better writers and attracting better management, and things of that nature. So again, as I said, I feel really good about it.

The term "blood and guts" used by McMahon was perceived as a reference to rival wrestling promotion All Elite Wrestling (AEW). On November 13, 2019, AEW filed a trademark for "Blood and Guts," a play on McMahon's term. During Revolution on February 29, 2020, AEW announced that the March 25 episode of Dynamite would be subtitled Blood & Guts, and feature the promotion's first WarGames match, billed as a "Blood and Guts match" since the WarGames trademark is owned by WWE. The WarGames match features two rings enclosed by a steel cage and was developed by wrestler Virgil Runnels, better known as "The American Dream" Dusty Rhodes, the father of former AEW executive vice president and in-ring talent Cody Rhodes.

The rules for the Blood and Guts match are based on the classic WarGames format from Jim Crockett Promotions, and not the modern WWE format. The notable format differences between the classic Crockett rules and the modern WWE rules are an enclosed cage with a roof (which was removed in modern versions) and the match can only be won with a submission or surrender. Like the classic Crockett format, a pin situation is not a win condition.

The event was originally scheduled to take place on March 25, 2020, at the Prudential Center in Newark, New Jersey, but was moved to an undisclosed location due to concerns stemming from the COVID-19 pandemic. On March 20, however, AEW President and CEO Tony Khan announced that the event had been postponed, stating that Blood & Guts would "happen when the time is right" and that a regular episode of Dynamite would instead air on March 25. Over a year later, Blood & Guts was officially rescheduled to air as the May 5, 2021, episode of Dynamite on TNT and be held at Daily's Place in Jacksonville, Florida due to the ongoing pandemic. AEW opened the venue up to 50 percent capacity, and expected 2,500 people to be in attendance, but roughly 1,600 fans attended the show (about 30 percent of the capacity of Daily's Place). The first hour of the event was pre-taped and shown on the jumbotron to the live audience, while the second hour, which featured the Blood and Guts match, occurred live. "Ruthless" by Nonpoint was the official theme song for the event.

=== Storylines ===
Blood & Guts featured professional wrestling matches that involved different wrestlers from pre-existing scripted feuds and storylines. Wrestlers portrayed heroes, villains, or less distinguishable characters in scripted events that built tension and culminated in a wrestling match or series of matches. Storylines were produced on AEW's weekly television program, Dynamite, the supplementary online streaming shows, Dark and Elevation, and The Young Bucks' YouTube series Being The Elite.

Following the announcement of Blood & Guts and the namesake match, on March 8, 2020, AEW announced that The Elite, composed of Adam Page, Cody, Kenny Omega, and The Young Bucks (Matt Jackson and Nick Jackson) would face The Inner Circle (Chris Jericho, Jake Hager, Sammy Guevara, Santana and Ortiz) in the match. With the postponement of the Blood & Guts event, the teams originally announced for the Blood and Guts match (although with Cody, then competing in the finals of the AEW TNT Championship tournament, being replaced by Matt Hardy, who was to substitute for a returning Nick Jackson, who had gotten injured) instead faced off in a Stadium Stampede match at Double or Nothing on May 23, 2020, which ended their feud.

While The Elite mostly went their separate ways, The Inner Circle remained a team and gained two new members in MJF and Wardlow, which ultimately resulted in Sammy Guevara quitting the team after a fallout with MJF. On the March 10, 2021 episode of Dynamite, a "War Council" was called of The Inner Circle, after Chris Jericho and MJF failed to capture the AEW World Tag Team Championship at Revolution. During the War Council, Guevara returned, revealing that MJF tried to betray Jericho. However, The Inner Circle was attacked by MJF's new stable that he had secretly formed, consisting of Wardlow, FTR (Cash Wheeler and Dax Harwood), Shawn Spears, and manager Tully Blanchard; the stable would subsequently be named The Pinnacle. This betrayal and attack resulted in the entirety of The Inner Circle turning face. During the April 7 episode of Dynamite, following attacks by members of both teams on each other over the past few weeks, it was announced that The Inner Circle would face The Pinnacle in the first-ever Blood and Guts match at the Blood & Guts television special, scheduled for May 5. On the final Dynamite before Blood & Guts, the two stables had a parlay to determine who would have the entry advantage, which the Pinnacle won.

Kenny Omega, Miro, Ethan Page and Scorpio Sky were also announced for speaking appearances.

== Reception ==
The Blood and Guts match was praised, with many people calling it a "brutal" match. However, the post-match aftermath was heavily criticized as home viewers could see that Chris Jericho landed on a crash pad (disguised as a steel platform on the entrance stage) when MJF threw him off the top of the cage, making the stunt look obviously fake. The amount of commercial breaks taken during the match were also criticized of disrupting the flow of said match and leaving the viewer out on key moments of action, which were inaudible and too small to see in the picture-in-picture.

According to PWInsider, a member of WWE management reportedly stated the match "just set the business back 30 years,"; however, some wrestlers reportedly loved the match stating they "would love to do something like that themselves." Although the event had been advertised as a "one-match show" (with only the Blood and Guts match being live), before the broadcast began, Tony Khan addressed the live crowd and offered refunds to any unhappy fans who were by chance unaware that the first half of the event had been pre-taped; only five refunds were issued.

=== Television ratings ===
Blood & Guts averaged 1,090,000 television viewers on TNT and a 0.42 rating in AEW's key demographic.

== Aftermath ==
On the May 12 episode of Dynamite, MJF challenged Jericho to a Stadium Stampede match between The Pinnacle and The Inner Circle at the Double or Nothing pay-per-view, with the stipulation that if The Inner Circle were to lose, they would disband. Jericho accepted the challenge on the following week's episode.

== Results ==
No.	Results	Stipulations	Times
1	Eddie Kingston and Jon Moxley defeated Kenny Omega and MT Nakazawa (with Don Callis)	Tag team match	8:02
2	Cody Rhodes (with Arn Anderson) defeated Q. T. Marshall (with The Factory (Aaron Solo, Anthony Ogogo, and Nick Comoroto)) by submission	Singles match	12:19
3	Dr. Britt Baker, D.M.D. (with Rebel) defeated Julia Hart by submission	Singles match	1:29
4	SoCal Uncensored (Christopher Daniels and Frankie Kazarian) defeated Jurassic Express (Jungle Boy and Luchasaurus) (with Marko Stunt), Varsity Blonds (Brian Pillman Jr. and Griff Garrison), and The Acclaimed (Anthony Bowens and Max Caster)	Four-way tag team match for an AEW World Tag Team Championship match on the May 12 episode of Dynamite	9:12
5	The Pinnacle (MJF, Wardlow, Shawn Spears, Cash Wheeler and Dax Harwood) (with Tully Blanchard) defeated The Inner Circle (Chris Jericho, Jake Hager, Sammy Guevara, Santana and Ortiz) by surrender (Note: Guevara surrendered on Jericho's behalf, resulting in The Pinnacle winning the match.)	Blood and Guts match Match could be won by submission or surrender.	33:58

== See also ==
- 2021 in professional wrestling
