= Blood & Guts (2026) =

2026 All Elite Wrestling television special

- Promotional poster featuring the competitors for the men's Blood and Guts match, with the match structure in the background
- Promotion: All Elite Wrestling
- Date: November 4, 2026
- City: Jacksonville, Florida
- Venue: VyStar Veterans Memorial Arena
- Attendance: 5,254
- Tagline: One cage. Two rings. Three words…

Blood & Guts chronology
← Previous; 2025	Next → —

AEW Dynamite special episodes chronology
← Previous; Fright Night	Next → Thanksgiving Eve

The 2026 Blood & Guts was a professional wrestling television special produced by All Elite Wrestling (AEW). It was the sixth annual Blood & Guts event and took place on November 4, 2026, at the VyStar Veterans Memorial Arena in Jacksonville, Florida. The event broadcast live as a special episode of AEW's flagship weekly television program, Wednesday Night Dynamite, simulcast on TBS and HBO Max.

The event is based around the Blood and Guts match, AEW's version of the WarGames match, a type of steel cage match in which two teams fight inside a roofed cell structure that surrounds two rings placed side-by-side. This was also the second consecutive year of the event being held during autumn, as all Blood & Guts events prior to 2025 took place in the summer.

== Production ==
=== Background ===
Other on-screen personnel
Role	Name
Commentators	Excalibur
Commentators	Tony Schiavone
Commentators	Taz
Commentators	Don Callis (Men's Blood and Guts match)
Ring announcer	Justin Roberts
Referees	Aubrey Edwards
Referees	Bryce Remsburg
Referees	Mike Posey
Referees	Paul Turner
Referees	Rick Knox
Interviewers	Renee Paquette
Interviewers	Mick Foley

Blood & Guts is an annual professional wrestling television special produced by the American promotion All Elite Wrestling (AEW) since 2021. The event typically airs as a mid-year special episode of the company's flagship weekly program, Wednesday Night Dynamite. The concept of the event comes from the Blood and Guts match, which is AEW's version of the classic WarGames match in which two teams fight inside a roofed cell structure that surrounds two rings placed side-by-side and is contested as the main event match of the card.

The inaugural event was originally scheduled to take place on March 25, 2020, at the Prudential Center in Newark, New Jersey, but was postponed due to the COVID-19 pandemic. Over a year later, Blood & Guts was officially rescheduled to air as the May 5, 2021, episode of Dynamite on TNT and be held at Daily's Place in Jacksonville, Florida due to the ongoing pandemic. The event returned in June 2022 and was held at the Little Caesars Arena in Detroit, Michigan following AEW's resumption of live touring in July 2021. Instead of airing on TNT, the 2022 event aired on TBS as Dynamite moved to TBS in January 2022. The 2023 event then moved Blood & Guts to July.

The 2025 edition which took place on November 12, 2025 at the First Horizon Coliseum in Greensboro, North Carolina was the first to take place in the latter part of the year. This was also the first WarGames-type match to take place at the First Horizon Coliseum since World Championship Wrestling's Great American Bash house show tour on August 10, 1991. The event also featured the first-ever women's Blood and Guts match in AEW.

On September 12, 2026, AEW announced that the 2026 edition of Blood & Guts would take place on November 4, 2026 at the Vystar Veterans Memorial Arena in Jacksonville, Florida. The event will also mark the return of Blood & Guts to Jacksonville since the 2021 edition which was held at nearby Daily's Place.

=== Storylines ===
Blood & Guts featured professional wrestling matches that involved different wrestlers from pre-existing scripted feuds and storylines. Storylines were produced on AEW's weekly television programs, Dynamite and Collision.

== Results ==
No.	Results	Stipulations	Times
1^{D}	Satnam Singh defeated Stunt Marshall	Singles match	—
2^{D}	Preston Vance defeated Kiran Grey	Singles match	—
3	The Brawling Birds (Jamie Hayter and Alex Windsor), Wrathlander (Harley Cameron and Kris Statlander), Willow Nightingale, and Queen Aminata defeated Triangle of Madness (Thekla, Julia Hart, and Skye Blue), Divine Dominion (Lena Kross and Megan Bayne), and Persephone by submission	Women's Blood and Guts match	45:25
4	The Don Callis Family (Kazuchika Okada, Kyle Fletcher, Wardlow, Kevin Knight, Mark Davis, and Jake Doyle) (with Don Callis) defeated Will Ospreay, Adam Copeland, Darby Allin, Steven Borden, and The Young Bucks (Matt Jackson and Nick Jackson) by surrender (Note: Copeland surrendered on his team's behalf.)	Men's Blood and Guts match	50:00
D / – this was a dark match
