= All Out (2026) =

All Elite Wrestling pay-per-view event

- Promotional poster featuring various AEW wrestlers
- Promotion: All Elite Wrestling
- Date: September 26, 2026
- City: Hoffman Estates, Illinois
- Venue: Now Arena
- Attendance: 9,456

Pay-per-view chronology
← Previous; All In	Next → WrestleDream

All Out chronology
← Previous; 2025	Next → —

The 2026 All Out was a professional wrestling pay-per-view (PPV) event produced by the American promotion All Elite Wrestling (AEW). It was the eighth annual All Out and took place on September 26, 2026, at the Now Arena in Hoffman Estates, Illinois. This was the fifth All Out to take place at the venue.

Twelve matches were contested at the event, including three on the Tailgate Brawl pre-show. In the main event, Will Ospreay defeated Jon Moxley to retain the AEW World Championship. In other prominent matches, The Young Bucks (Matt Jackson and Nick Jackson) defeated defending champion Cage and Cope (Christian Cage and Adam Copeland) and FTR (Cash Wheeler and Dax Harwood) in a three-way ladder match to win the AEW World Tag Team Championship, The Brawling Birds (Jamie Hayter and Alex Windsor) defeated Divine Dominion (Lena Kross and Megan Bayne) in a Chicago Street Fight to retain the AEW Women's World Tag Team Championship, and Kazuchika Okada defeated Tommaso Ciampa to retain the AEW International Championship. The event was also notable for the return of Samoa Joe, who had been on hiatus since May earlier that year, the debut of Dani Luna, and Pac's final match before his death the following day.

== Production ==
=== Background ===
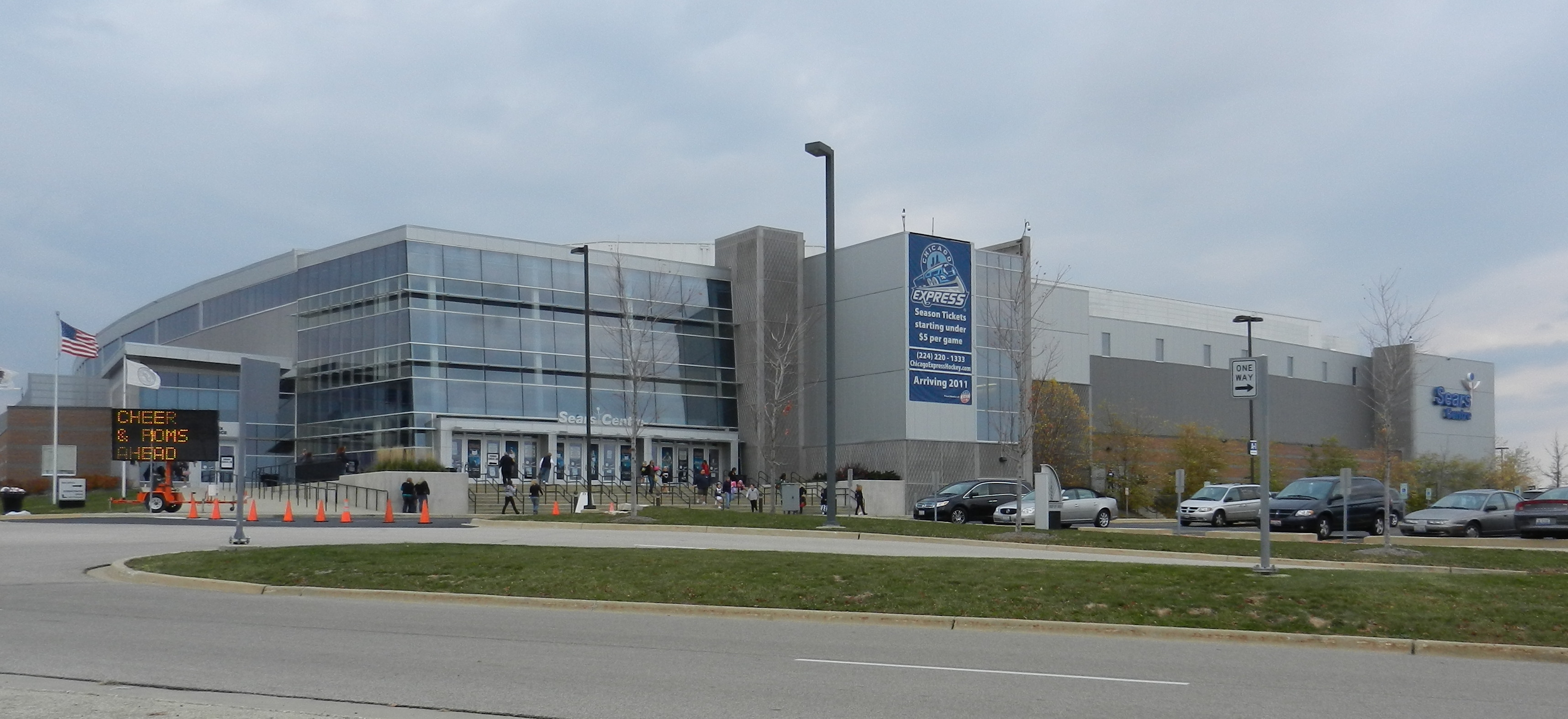
The event was held at the Now Arena in Hoffman Estates, Illinois, marking the fifth time that All Out was held at the venue.

All Out is an annual professional wrestling pay-per-view (PPV) event held in September by All Elite Wrestling (AEW) since 2019. It is one of AEW's "Big Five" PPVs, which also includes All In, Double or Nothing, Full Gear, and Revolution, their five biggest annual shows produced throughout the year.

On July 6, 2026, AEW announced that the 2026 All Out would take place at the Now Arena in Hoffman Estates, Illinois. This marked the fifth All Out and sixth AEW PPV to be held at the venue. Tickets for the event went on sale July 13.

All Out took place on the same day as WWE's Worlds Collide event, which was held at the nearby Allstate Arena in Rosemont, marking direct WWE-AEW competition in the Chicago area.

=== Broadcast outlets ===
Other on-screen personnel
Role	Name
Commentators	Excalibur (Pre-show and PPV)
Commentators	Tony Schiavone (Pre-show and PPV)
Commentators	Taz (Pre-show and PPV)
Commentators	Nigel McGuinness (PPV)
Commentators	Don Callis (International Championship, #1 contenders tag team)
Spanish Commentators	Carlos Cabrera
Spanish Commentators	Alvaro Riojas
Spanish Commentators	Ariel Levy
Ring announcers	Justin Roberts (PPV)
Ring announcers	Arkady Aura (Pre-show and PPV)
Referees	Aubrey Edwards
Referees	Brandon Martinez
Referees	Bryce Remsburg
Referees	Mike Posey
Referees	Paul Turner
Referees	Rick Knox
Referees	Stephon Smith
Pre-show hosts	Renee Paquette
Pre-show hosts	RJ City
Pre-show hosts	Mick Foley
Pre-show hosts	Jeff Jarrett

All Out aired via PPV through traditional cable and satellite providers. In the United States, AEW PPV events are available on HBO Max at an exclusive rate for subscribers. The event was also available to livestream in the United States and internationally on Prime Video, PPV.com, and YouTube. Additionally in the United States, the show was broadcast at Dave & Buster's and Tom's Watch Bar locations. Outside of the United States and Canada, the event was available to stream on MyAEW.

=== Storylines ===
All Out featured 12 professional wrestling matches that involved different wrestlers from pre-existing feuds and storylines. Storylines were produced on AEW's weekly television programs, Dynamite and Collision.

On the September 2 episode of Dynamite, following the main event, Jon Moxley came to the aid of AEW World Champion Will Ospreay, saving him from an attack. It was subsequently announced that Moxley would challenge Ospreay for the AEW World Championship at All Out. Earlier that night, Mercedes Moné celebrated her AEW Women's World Championship title win over Willow Nightingale at All In before being interrupted by Thekla, who challenged her to a title match. Nightingale then came out and demanded her contractual rematch. It was later announced that Moné was not medically cleared to compete at All Out, leading to a No. 1 contenders match at the event between Thekla and Nightingale to determine Moné's challenger for the title at WrestleDream.

== Results ==
No.	Results	Stipulations	Times
1^{P}	Jack Perry defeated Katsuyori Shibata by pinfall	Singles match	9:15
2^{P}	Sisters of Sin (Julia Hart and Skye Blue) defeated Mina Shirakawa and Queen Aminata by pinfall	Tag team match	9:55
3^{P}	Bang Bang Gang (Jay White, Ace Austin, Austin Gunn, and Colten Gunn) (with Juice Robinson) defeated Death Riders (Daniel Garcia and Wheeler Yuta) and The Dogs (David Finlay and Clark Connors) (with Marina Shafir) by pinfall	Eight-man Tornado Tailgate Brawl	12:10
4	Andrade El Ídolo (c) defeated Pac (with Marina Shafir) by pinfall	Singles match for the AEW National Championship	18:40
5	The Don Callis Family (Kevin Knight and Kyle Fletcher) (with Don Callis) defeated Darby Allin and Steven Borden by referee stoppage	Tag team match to determine the #1 contenders to the AEW World Tag Team Championship	12:25
6	Persephone (c) (with Dr. Britt Baker, D.M.D.) defeated Dani Luna by pinfall	Singles match for the AEW TBS Championship; This was an open challenge (excluding Hyan, Maya World, and Thunder Rosa).	14:05
7	Kazuchika Okada (c) (with Don Callis) defeated Tommaso Ciampa by pinfall	Singles match for the AEW International Championship	21:05
8	The Brawling Birds (Jamie Hayter and Alex Windsor) (c) defeated Divine Dominion (Lena Kross and Megan Bayne) by pinfall	Chicago Street Fight for the AEW Women's World Tag Team Championship	17:35
9	Swerve Strickland and The New Level (Austin Creed and Kofi) (c) (with Prince Nana) defeated "Hangman" Adam Page and Brodido (Brody King and Bandido) by pinfall	Trios match for the AEW World Trios Championship	24:05
10	Thekla defeated Willow Nightingale by pinfall	Singles match to determine the #1 contender to the AEW Women's World Championship at WrestleDream	13:35
11	The Young Bucks (Matt Jackson and Nick Jackson) defeated Cage and Cope (Christian Cage and Adam Copeland) (c) and FTR (Cash Wheeler and Dax Harwood) (with Stokely)	Three-way ladder match for the AEW World Tag Team Championship	23:25
12	Will Ospreay (c) (with Francesco Akira and "Speedball" Mike Bailey) defeated Jon Moxley (with Daniel Garcia, Marina Shafir, and Wheeler Yuta) by pinfall	Singles match for the AEW World Championship	33:00
(c) / – the champion(s) heading into the match; P / – the match was broadcast on the pre-show

== Aftermath ==
On September 27, 2026, AEW announced that Pac, who had competed for the AEW National Championship at All Out less than 24 hours earlier, had died at the age of 40. His cause of death was later officially determined to be bronchial asthma. He was subsequently commemorated on the following episode of Dynamite.
