= Blood & Guts (2024) =

All Elite Wrestling television special

- Promotional poster featuring Team Elite (left) and Team AEW (right)
- Promotion: All Elite Wrestling
- Date: July 24, 2024
- City: Nashville, Tennessee
- Venue: Bridgestone Arena
- Attendance: 5,009

Blood & Guts chronology
← Previous; 2023	Next → 2025

AEW Dynamite special episodes chronology
← Previous; Dynamite 250	Next → Grand Slam

AEW Rampage special episodes chronology
← Previous; Beach Break	Next → Winter Is Coming

The 2024 Blood & Guts was a professional wrestling television special produced by All Elite Wrestling (AEW). It was the fourth annual Blood & Guts event and took place on July 24, 2024, at Bridgestone Arena in Nashville, Tennessee. The event was broadcast live as a special episode of AEW's flagship weekly television program, Wednesday Night Dynamite on TBS. The July 26 episode of Friday Night Rampage on TNT, which was a special episode titled Royal Rampage and the third annual and final Royal Rampage, was also taped the same night immediately after the live broadcast of Blood & Guts. The event was based around the Blood and Guts match, AEW's version of the WarGames match, a type of steel cage match in which two teams fight inside a roofed cell structure that surrounds two rings placed side-by-side.the roofed cage surrounds two rings placed side by side.

Five matches were contested during the live broadcast of Blood & Guts, with an additional three matches taped for Royal Rampage. In the main event, which was a Blood and Guts match, Team AEW (Swerve Strickland, Mark Briscoe, Darby Allin, Max Caster, and Anthony Bowens) defeated Team Elite (Matthew Jackson, Nicholas Jackson, Kazuchika Okada, Jack Perry, and "Hangman" Adam Page) by surrender. In other prominent matches, Dr. Britt Baker, D.M.D. defeated Hikaru Shida, and in the opening bout, Chris Jericho defeated Minoru Suzuki in an FTW Rules match to retain the FTW Championship. Former National Wrestling Alliance (NWA) wrestler Kamille also appeared at the event, and it was confirmed that she had signed with AEW; she previously appeared in AEW in 2021 through an agreement with the NWA.

== Production ==
=== Background ===
Blood & Guts is an annual television special produced by the American professional wrestling promotion All Elite Wrestling (AEW) since 2021. The event airs mid-year as a special episode of the company's flagship weekly program, Wednesday Night Dynamite. The concept of the event comes from the Blood and Guts match, which is AEW's version of the classic WarGames match in which two teams fight inside a roofed cell structure that surrounds two rings placed side-by-side and is contested as the main event match of the card. Since 2022, a special episode of Friday Night Rampage called Royal Rampage has been taped in conjunction with Blood & Guts.

On June 12, 2024, AEW announced that the fourth annual Blood & Guts would air live as the July 24 episode of Dynamite on TBS and would be held at the Bridgestone Arena in Nashville, Tennessee. Additionally, it was announced that the July 26 episode of Rampage would be taped immediately after the live broadcast of Blood & Guts and would air on tape delay on TNT as the third annual Royal Rampage special.

=== Storylines ===
Other on-screen personnel
Role	Name
Commentators	Excalibur (both shows)
Commentators	Tony Schiavone (both shows)
Commentators	Taz (Dynamite)
Commentators	Matt Menard (Rampage)
Ring announcer	Justin Roberts
Referees	Aubrey Edwards
Referees	Bryce Remsburg
Referees	Paul Turner
Referees	Rick Knox
Referees	Stephon Smith
Interviewers	Renee Paquette
Interviewers	Alex Marvez

Blood & Guts featured professional wrestling matches that involved different wrestlers from pre-existing scripted feuds and storylines. Storylines were produced on AEW's weekly television programs, Dynamite, Rampage, and Collision, and The Dark Order's YouTube series Being The Dark Order.

At Forbidden Door, Jack Perry won the AEW TNT Championship in a match with five other participants, including Mark Briscoe. At Dynamite: Beach Break, Briscoe said that Perry got lucky only for Perry to appear and attack Briscoe with the championship belt. Kyle O'Reilly came out and defended Briscoe and attacked Perry but Perry's Elite stablemates, The Young Bucks (Matthew Jackson and Nicholas Jackson) and Kazuchika Okada, ran out and laid out O'Reilly and Briscoe until The Acclaimed (Max Caster and Anthony Bowens) confronted them and The Elite retreated. Soon after it was announced that Mark Briscoe and four others would face The Elite in a Blood and Guts match at Blood & Guts with The Elite needing to find a fifth member for their team. The Elite originally asked "Hangman" Adam Page, who was formerly a part of The Elite, but he refused. They then attempted to recruit AEW World Champion Swerve Strickland, who denied and joined Team AEW. On the July 10 episode of Dynamite, Page, who had a heated history with Strickland, lost in the Owen Hart Cup final, preventing him from having another match against Strickland. Afterwards, Page confronted The Elite and reluctantly agreed to be their fifth member as it would allow him to fight Strickland. The Acclaimed were then soon added as members to Team AEW, but they still needed a fifth member. At Dynamite 250, both teams confronted each other from the ramp until Darby Allin descended from the rafters, making him the fifth member of Team AEW as both teams proceeded to brawl on the ramp.

On the June 26 episode of Dynamite, Minoru Suzuki appeared on the TitanTron as Chris Jericho wanted Suzuki to be his and Big Bill's trio partner at Forbidden Door. However, Suzuki instead challenged Jericho to a match at Forbidden Door for the FTW Championship but Jericho refused. At Dynamite 250 on July 17, Suzuki again confronted Jericho, this time face-to-face and challenged Jericho to a match the following week at Blood & Guts, which Jericho this time accepted.

On the July 20 episode of Collision, Hikaru Shida faced Skye Blue in a match that ended due to referee stoppage after Blue became injured and could not continue. Shida then challenged Dr. Britt Baker, D.M.D. to a match at Blood & Guts, which was subsequently made official.

After winning the women's Owen Hart Cup and turning on AEW Women's World Champion "Timeless" Toni Storm, AEW announced that Mariah May would debut under a new gimmick called "The Glamour" at Blood & Guts, and revealed her new theme song, "Dream Over" by Mikey Rukus.

== Event ==
=== Blood & Guts ===
Before the televised broadcast, a non-televised dark match took place where Elijah Drago defeated QT Marshall.

At the start of the show Alex Marvez attempted to interview Will Ospreay in a hotel garage only for Ospreay to decline. Ospreay went to his car but found a knife in the tire. Ospreay then demanded Marvez's car which Marvez agreed to give him. Ospreay entered Marvez's vehicle and told Marvez to get in before driving off.

MJF then came out, with The Nashville Arena Football cheerleaders dancing as he entered, and began bragging about his victory against Ospreay the previous week at Dynamite 250 with MJF calling Ospreay a "gutless coward" for not hitting the Tiger Driver '91 during the match. He then ridiculed Ospreay's recently deceased grandmother and called him and the AEW International Championship, which he also won the previous week from Ospreay, worthless. MJF then threw the International Championship in a garbage can at ringside before unveiling a new version of the International Championship and began calling himself the "American Champion". Suddenly, Ospreay came out to the ring and MJF retreated from the ring and said he would return for the International Championship at All In.

Referee Bryce Remsburg was shown backstage entering a room with The Elite, without "Hangman" Adam Page, in with Christopher Daniels lying on the floor. Remsburg asked for a coin to decided which team gets the advantage in the Blood & Guts match. Matthew Jackson instead flipped a coin, insisting it was not rigged, and Team Elite got the advantage for the Blood & Guts match. Remsburg then asked where Hangman was only to be reassured by Matthew that he was coming. As they were leaving, Matthew held up the coin the camera and showed that it was actually rigged.

Next was the opening match of the Blood & Guts broadcast with Chris Jericho taking on Minoru Suzuki for the FTW Championship in a FTW Rules match with Big Bill and Bryan Keith banned from ringside. In the end, Suzuki attempted a Gotch style piledrive on Jericho but Jericho hit Suzuki with a lowblow and then Jericho hit the Judas Effect on Suzuki and pinned him for the win with him retaining the FTW Championship in the process. After the match, Suzuki got up and hit Jericho with the Gotch style piledriver only for Jericho's Learning Tree members Big Bill and Bryan Keith to attack Suzuki. Katsuyori Shibata then came out and defended Suzuki from Bill and Keith.

Backstage, Renee Paquette was interviewing Willow Nightingale only for Stokely Hathaway to approach her and distract her before Kris Statlander attacked her from behind. Hathaway then suggested that on next week's Dynamite Statlander have an Eliminator match for Nightingale's CMLL World Women's Championship as Statlander held it in her hands. Statlander then dropped the title on Nightingale as both her and Hathaway walked away.

Then an interview showing Bryan Danielson interviewed by Renee Paquette was shown only for Jeff Jarrett to interrupt Danielson and said it was an honor to raise his hand in Calgary, when Danielson won the 2024 Men's Owen Hart Cup, and said that he a lot of people believe in him and he was on top of that list.

Next, Dr. Britt Baker, D.M.D took on Hikaru Shida. In the end, Baker countered the katana and rolled up Shida into the Lock Jaw and Shida then tapped out. After the match, Mercedes Moné confronted Baker and taunted her at ringside, only for a debuting Kamille to attack Baker in the ring.

After that The Patriarchy was shown backstage, with Christian Cage telling Nick Wayne he has the right to speak for himself. After the other members of The Patriarchy left, Kip Sabian confronted Wayne and Wayne asked him what his deal was only for Sabian to deny there was one. Wayne then asked Sabian if he was in the upcoming Royal Rampage match and said he was going to throw him out.

Up next, Pac faced off against Boulder, accompanied by Bronson and Jacked Jameson. In the end, Pac delivered a shotgun dropkick to Boulder and hit him with a brainbuster for the quick victory.

In the penultimate match Mariah May, debuting her Glamour gimmick, took on Kaitland Alexis. In the end, May hit Alexis with a hip attack in the corner and a Storm Zero for the quick win. After the match, "Timeless" Toni Storm's music began playing but she did not appear as Mariah laughed. Suddenly Storm appeared behind May and security and referees separated the two. Storm then grabbed a microphone and asked May if she was prepared to die, because she was.

In the main event of the Blood & Guts broadcast, Team AEW (Swerve Strickland, Mark Briscoe, Darby Allin, Max Caster, and Anthony Bowens), accompanied by (with Prince Nana, Jeff Jarrett, and Billy Gunn) faced off against Team Elite Matthew Jackson, Nicholas Jackson, Kazuchika Okada, Jack Perry, and "Hangman" Adam Page) in a Blood and Guts match. In the end, Nicholas Jackson climbed up the side of the cage only for Bowens to follow him. Jackson then kicked Bowens and Bowens fell off the side of the cage through four tables below. Briscoe, inside the cage, hit the Jay Driller on Okada. Briscoe then delivered a Jay Driller on Nicholas and hit a Froggy Bowem through a table on Nicholas before Allin climbed to the roof of the cage and, while hanging on the ceiling of the cage, delivered a coffin drop to Perry through a table. With the rest of Team Elite incapacitated, Caster then got some handcuffs and handcuffed Perry to the cage, while also handcuffing Matthew to the bottom rope, Briscoe then started hitting Perry with a kendo stick and then with a steel chair to the head while asking him to quit but Perry relented. Allin then threatened to set Perry on fire unless he got a AEW TNT Championship match at All In but Perry spat at Allin. Matthew then yelled it had gone too far and said Allin had gotten his championship match at All In. However Allin wanted them to say he quit also. Matthew then relented and surrendered, giving Team AEW the victory.

=== Royal Rampage ===
In the opening match of the Royal Rampage broadcast, was the namesake match. In the end, Darby Allin had Claudio Castagnoli draped over the top rope, Allin then hit the coffin drop on Castagnoli from the top rope and Castagnoli fell out the ring and was eliminated, thus Allin won and received an AEW World Championship match at Grand Slam.

Up next, Kris Statlander, with Stokely Hathaway, took on Leila Grey. In the end, Statlander hit Grey with the Staturday Night Fever for the quick victory.

After that, Lance Archer took on Alejandro. In the end, Archer hit the Blackout on Alejandro for the quick victory.

In the main event of the Royal Rampage broadcast, The Don Callis Family (Kyle Fletcher and Rush) took on The Outrunners (Turbo Floyd and Truth Magnum), The Righteous (Vincent and Dutch), and Private Party ("Brother Zay" Isiah Kassidy and Marq Quen). In the end, Fletcher won the match with a belly to back tombstone to Magnum for the victory. After the match Rush and Fletcher attacked some of the participants and Rush whipped Floyd with the camera cable.

== Aftermath ==
This would be the final Blood & Guts to have a Royal Rampage special taped in conjunction with the show as Rampage was cancelled at the end of 2024, thus ending the Royal Rampage special.

== Results ==
Dynamite (aired live July 24)
No.	Results	Stipulations	Times
1^{D}	Elijah Drago defeated QT Marshall	Singles match	—
2	Chris Jericho (c) defeated Minoru Suzuki by pinfall	FTW Rules match for the FTW Championship; The Learning Tree (Big Bill and Bryan Keith) were barred from ringside.	13:55
3	Dr. Britt Baker, D.M.D. defeated Hikaru Shida by submission	Singles match	10:15
4	Pac defeated Boulder (with Bronson and Jacked Jameson) by pinfall	Singles match	1:45
5	Mariah May defeated Kaitland Alexis by pinfall	Singles match	1:25
6	Team AEW (Swerve Strickland, Mark Briscoe, Darby Allin, Max Caster, and Anthony Bowens) (with Prince Nana, Jeff Jarrett, and Billy Gunn) defeated Team Elite (Matthew Jackson, Nicholas Jackson, Kazuchika Okada, Jack Perry, and "Hangman" Adam Page) by surrender (Note: Matthew Jackson surrendered on Perry's behalf, resulting in Team AEW winning the match.)	Blood and Guts match Match could be won by submission or surrender.	48:40
(c) / – the champion(s) heading into the match; D / – this was a dark match

Rampage (aired on tape delay July 26)
No.	Results	Stipulations	Times
1	Darby Allin won by last eliminating Claudio Castagnoli	20-man Royal Rampage Battle Royal for an AEW World Championship match at Grand Slam	38:00
2	Kris Statlander (with Stokely Hathaway) defeated Leila Grey by pinfall	Singles match	0:55
3	Lance Archer defeated Alejandro by pinfall	Singles match	1:00
4	The Don Callis Family (Kyle Fletcher and Rush) defeated The Outrunners (Turbo Floyd and Truth Magnum), The Righteous (Vincent and Dutch), and Private Party ("Brother Zay" Isiah Kassidy and Marq Quen) by pinfall	Four-way tag team match	10:00

=== Royal Rampage match entrances and eliminations ===
The Royal Rampage match is a two ring 20-man rumble rules battle royal. Two wrestlers start in each ring, then another wrestler enters every 60 seconds, and goes to his assigned ring (red or blue) until all 20 have entered (10 per ring). Eliminations occur by going over the top rope. The final two wrestlers in each ring then consolidate into a single ring, and the last wrestler remaining is declared the winner.

– Blue Ring
– Red Ring
– Winner

Draw	Entrant	Order	Eliminated by	Elimination(s)
1	Orange Cassidy	10	Matt Taven	1
2	Claudio Castagnoli	19	Darby Allin	3
3	Brody King	16	Darby Allin	1
4	Komander	4	Nick Wayne	0
5	Tomohiro Ishii	8	Mike Bennett	1
6	Brian Cage	18	Claudio Castagnoli	1
7	The Butcher	3	Brody King	0
8	Matt Menard	2	Brian Cage	0
9	Roderick Strong	15	Brody King	1
10	Kip Sabian	6	Jay Lethal and Jeff Jarrett	1
11	Brandon Cutler	1	Tomohiro Ishii	0
12	Nick Wayne	5	Kip Sabian	1
13	Kyle O'Reilly	12	Roderick Strong	1
14	Jeff Jarrett	17	Brian Cage	1
15	Matt Taven	11	Kyle O'Reilly	1
16	Jay Lethal	14	Claudio Castagnoli	1
17	Mike Bennett	9	Orange Cassidy	1
18	The Beast Mortos	7	Lio Rush	1
19	Darby Allin	–	Winner	2
20	Lio Rush	13	Claudio Castagnoli	1
