= AEW Blood & Guts =

All Elite Wrestling television special series

- Original AEW Blood & Guts logo (2021–2024)
- Promotions: All Elite Wrestling
- First event: 2021
- Signature matches: Blood & Guts match

AEW Blood & Guts (also stylized as Blood and Guts) is an annual professional wrestling television special produced by the American promotion All Elite Wrestling (AEW) since 2021. The event typically airs mid-year as a special episode of the promotion's flagship weekly television program, Wednesday Night Dynamite; it originally aired on TNT in 2021, but has aired on TBS since 2022 and simulcast on HBO Max beginning in 2025. The concept of the event comes from the Blood and Guts match, which is AEW's version of the classic WarGames match in which two teams fight inside a roofed cell structure that surrounds two rings placed side-by-side. Each main event match of the card is contested under the Blood and Guts stipulation.

The inaugural event was originally scheduled to occur in March 2020, but due to the COVID-19 pandemic, it was delayed and instead took place in May 2021. The 2022 event moved it to June before moving to July beginning with the 2023 event. The 2025 event was the latest scheduled as it was held in November and also featured the first-ever women's Blood and Guts match in AEW.

From 2022 to 2024, a special episode of Friday Night Rampage titled Royal Rampage was also taped in conjunction with the Blood & Guts special, making use of the double ring. Rampage was cancelled at the end of 2024, thus ending the Royal Rampage special.

== History ==
=== Blood & Guts (2021–present) ===
On July 25, 2019, World Wrestling Entertainment, Inc. (WWE), as a publicly traded company, conducted a conference call to announce its second-quarter fiscal year 2019 results. During the call, Eric Katz of Wolfe Research, LLC, asked WWE Chairman and Chief Executive Officer (CEO) Vince McMahon questions regarding naming Eric Bischoff and Paul Heyman as Executive Directors to WWE and its relationship to the future of WWE content, especially with stricter Broadcast Standards and Practices at the Fox network for SmackDown's upcoming move to broadcast television. McMahon responded to Katz's question:

We're going to be a bit edgier, but still remain in the PG environment. We just haven't come anywhere close actually to going into another level. So that will be something we'll do in terms of direction of content, more controversy, better storylines, et cetera. But at the same time, we're not going to go back to the Attitude Era, and we're not going to do “blood and guts” and things of that nature such as being done on perhaps a new potential competitor. We're just not going to go back to that gory crap that we graduated from. And again, a more sophisticated product, again, attracting much better writers and attracting better management, and things of that nature. So again, as I said, I feel really good about it.

The term "blood and guts" used by McMahon was perceived as a reference to rival wrestling promotion All Elite Wrestling (AEW). On November 13, 2019, AEW filed a trademark for "Blood & Guts," a play on McMahon's term. During Revolution on February 29, 2020, AEW announced that the March 25 episode of Wednesday Night Dynamite would be subtitled Blood & Guts, and feature the promotion's first WarGames match, billed as a "Blood and Guts match" due to WWE owning the WarGames trademark.

The inaugural event was originally scheduled to take place on March 25, 2020, at the Prudential Center in Newark, New Jersey, but was postponed due to the COVID-19 pandemic. Over a year later, Blood & Guts was officially rescheduled to air as the May 5, 2021, episode of Dynamite on TNT and be held at Daily's Place in Jacksonville, Florida due to the ongoing pandemic. The event returned in June 2022 and was held at the Little Caesars Arena in Detroit, Michigan following AEW's resumption of live touring in July 2021. Instead of airing on TNT, the 2022 event aired on TBS as Dynamite moved to TBS in January 2022. The 2023 event then moved Blood & Guts to July.

On September 30, 2025, AEW announced that the fifth annual Blood & Guts would air live as the November 12, 2025, episode of Dynamite, simulcast on TBS and HBO Max, and it would be held at the First Horizon Coliseum in Greensboro, North Carolina. While prior events were held mid-year, the 2025 edition was the first to take place in the latter part of the year. This was also the first WarGames-type match to take place at the First Horizon Coliseum since World Championship Wrestling's Great American Bash house show tour on August 10, 1991. The event also featured the first-ever women's Blood and Guts match in AEW.

=== Royal Rampage (2022–2024) ===
From 2022 to 2024, Friday Night Rampage — which was usually taped at the same venue on Wednesday nights following the Dynamite broadcast — featured the "Royal Rampage", a modified Rumble rules battle royal specifically adapted to accommodate the two-ring setup used for Blood & Guts. The winner of the Royal Rampage received a future championship match. Rampage was cancelled at the end of 2024, thus ending the Royal Rampage special.

== Concept ==
The concept of the event comes from the Blood and Guts match, and each main event match of the card is contested under this stipulation. It uses the classic WarGames format from Jim Crockett Promotions, which differs from the modified WWE format. The match features two rings enclosed by a steel cage, which was developed by wrestler Virgil Runnels, better known as "The American Dream" Dusty Rhodes.

The notable format differences between the classic Crockett rules and the modified WWE rules include the cage itself—the Crockett version used an enclosed cage, while WWE uses an open top cage—and under Crockett rules, the match can only be won with a submission or surrender, where in WWE, the match can also end by pinfall. Additionally, going outside the cage is allowed in AEW's version, but in WWE's version, if a member of the team exits the cage, it results in a forfeit for that team.

== Events ==
The main event of the first 4 cards was contested as the Blood and Guts match but now there are 2 B&G matches as women also have their own.

Event #		Date	City	Venue	Blood & Guts match	Ref.
1	Blood & Guts (2021)	May 5, 2021	Jacksonville, Florida	Daily's Place	The Pinnacle (MJF, Wardlow, Shawn Spears, Cash Wheeler, and Dax Harwood) vs. The Inner Circle (Chris Jericho, Jake Hager, Sammy Guevara, Santana, and Ortiz)	
2	Blood & Guts (2022)	June 29, 2022	Detroit, Michigan	Little Caesars Arena	Blackpool Combat Club (Jon Moxley, Claudio Castagnoli, and Wheeler Yuta), Eddie Kingston, Santana, and Ortiz vs. The Jericho Appreciation Society (Chris Jericho, Jake Hager, Sammy Guevara, Daniel Garcia, Matt Menard, and Angelo Parker)	
3	Blood & Guts (2023)	July 19, 2023	Boston, Massachusetts	TD Garden	The Golden Elite (Kenny Omega, Matt Jackson, Nick Jackson, "Hangman" Adam Page, and Kota Ibushi) vs. Blackpool Combat Club (Jon Moxley, Claudio Castagnoli, and Wheeler Yuta), Konosuke Takeshita, and Pac	
4	Blood & Guts (2024)	July 24, 2024	Nashville, Tennessee	Bridgestone Arena	Team AEW (Swerve Strickland, Mark Briscoe, Darby Allin, Max Caster, and Anthony Bowens) vs. The Elite (Matthew Jackson, Nicholas Jackson, Kazuchika Okada, Jack Perry, and "Hangman" Adam Page)	
5	Blood & Guts (2025)	November 12, 2025	Greensboro, North Carolina	First Horizon Coliseum	Marina Shafir, Megan Bayne, Mercedes Moné, and Triangle of Madness (Julia Hart, Skye Blue, and Thekla) vs. Harley Cameron, Jamie Hayter, Kris Statlander, Mina Shirakawa, Toni Storm, and Willow Nightingale	
5	Blood & Guts (2025)	November 12, 2025	Greensboro, North Carolina	First Horizon Coliseum	Darby Allin, Roderick Strong, and The Conglomeration (Mark Briscoe, Orange Cassidy, and Kyle O'Reilly) vs. Death Riders (Jon Moxley, Claudio Castagnoli, Wheeler Yuta, Daniel Garcia, and Pac)	
6	Blood & Guts (2026)	November 4, 2026	Jacksonville, Florida	VyStar Veterans Memorial Arena	Triangle of Madness (Julia Hart, Skye Blue, and Thekla) and Divine Dominion (Megan Bayne and Lena Kross) and Persephone vs. Willow Nightingale, Wrathlander (Harley Cameron and Kris Statlander) and The Brawling Birds (Alex Windsor and Jamie Hayter) and Queen Aminata	
6	Blood & Guts (2026)	November 4, 2026	Jacksonville, Florida	VyStar Veterans Memorial Arena	Will Ospreay, Adam Copeland, Darby Allin, Steven Borden, and The Young Bucks (Matt Jackson and Nick Jackson) vs. The Don Callis Family (Kazuchika Okada, Kyle Fletcher, Wardlow, Kevin Knight, Mark Davis and Jake Doyle)	

== Royal Rampage results ==
Year	Winner	Championship opportunity	Championship match result
2022	Brody King	AEW Interim World Championship	Lost to Jon Moxley on the following week's Dynamite.
2023	Darby Allin	AEW TNT Championship	Lost to Luchasaurus at All Out.
2024	Darby Allin	AEW World Championship	Lost title shot to Jon Moxley at Grand Slam.

== See also ==
- List of All Elite Wrestling special events
- List of AEW Dynamite special episodes
- List of AEW Rampage special episodes
