= Blood & Guts (2023) =

All Elite Wrestling television special

- Promotional poster featuring various AEW wrestlers
- Promotion: All Elite Wrestling
- Date: July 19, 2023
- City: Boston, Massachusetts
- Venue: TD Garden
- Attendance: 8,956

Blood & Guts chronology
← Previous; 2022	Next → 2024

AEW Dynamite special episodes chronology
← Previous; New Year's Smash	Next → Fight for the Fallen

AEW Rampage special episodes chronology
← Previous; Rampage 100	Next → Fight for the Fallen

The 2023 Blood & Guts was the third annual Blood & Guts professional wrestling television special produced by All Elite Wrestling (AEW). It was held on July 19, 2023, at the TD Garden in Boston, Massachusetts. The event aired as a special episode of AEW's primary weekly television program, Wednesday Night Dynamite, which aired live on TBS. The July 21 episode of Friday Night Rampage on TNT, which was a special episode titled Royal Rampage and the second annual Royal Rampage, was also taped the same night immediately after the live broadcast of Blood & Guts.

Four matches were held for the live broadcast of Blood & Guts, with an additional three matches taped for Royal Rampage. Per the theme of the show, the main event was the Blood and Guts match, in which The Golden Elite (Kenny Omega, "Hangman" Adam Page, Matt Jackson, Nick Jackson, and Kota Ibushi) defeated Blackpool Combat Club (Jon Moxley, Claudio Castagnoli, and Wheeler Yuta), Konosuke Takeshita, and Pac. In another prominent match, Adam Cole and MJF defeated The Jericho Appreciation Society (Daniel Garcia and Sammy Guevara) in the finals of the Blind Eliminator Tag Team Tournament and in the opening contest, Jack Perry defeated Hook to win the FTW Championship.

== Production ==
Other on-screen personnel
Role	Name
Commentators	Excalibur (both shows)
Commentators	Tony Schiavone (both shows)
Commentators	Taz (Dynamite)
Commentators	Chris Jericho (Blind Eliminator Tag Team Tournament Finals and Rampage)
Commentators	Don Callis (Blood and Guts match)
Ring announcer	Justin Roberts
Referees	Bryce Remsburg
Referees	Paul Turner
Referees	Aubrey Edwards
Referees	Rick Knox
Referees	Stephon Smith
Interviewers	Renee Paquette
Interviewers	Alex Marvez

=== Background ===
Blood & Guts is an annual television special produced by the American professional wrestling promotion All Elite Wrestling (AEW) since 2021. The event airs mid-year as a special episode of the company's primary weekly program, Wednesday Night Dynamite. The concept of the event comes from the Blood and Guts match, which is AEW's version of the classic WarGames match in which two teams fight inside a roofed cell structure that surrounds two rings placed side-by-side and is contested as the main event match of the card.

On June 28, 2023, AEW announced that the third annual Blood & Guts would air live as the July 19 episode of Dynamite on TBS and would be held at the TD Garden in Boston, Massachusetts. Additionally, it was announced that the July 21 episode of Friday Night Rampage would be taped immediately after the live broadcast of Blood & Guts and would air on tape delay on TNT as the second annual Royal Rampage special episode.

=== Storylines ===
Blood & Guts featured professional wrestling matches that involved different wrestlers from pre-existing scripted feuds and storylines. Wrestlers portrayed heroes, villains, or less distinguishable characters in scripted events that built tension and culminated in a wrestling match or series of matches. Storylines were produced on AEW's weekly television programs, Dynamite, Collision, and Rampage.

In June 2023, AEW announced a men's tag team tournament consisting of eight teams that would begin that summer. The rules of the tournament were that all men would be paired at random via a draw, which was conducted on and off screen by Renee Paquette and RJ City. The tournament began on July 5, airing live on Dynamite and on tape delay on July 7 on Rampage. This concept is similar to World Championship Wrestling's BattleBowl tournament where the teams were drawn at random in a "Lethal Lottery".

== Reception ==
=== Television ratings ===
Blood & Guts averaged 953,000 viewers, which is the largest number since February 22, with 0.34 rating in AEW's key demographic.

== Results ==
Dynamite (aired live July 19)
No.	Results	Stipulations	Times
1	Jack Perry defeated Hook (c) by pinfall	Singles match for the FTW Championship	11:40
2	Dr. Britt Baker, D.M.D. defeated Kayla Sparks by submission	Singles match	1:05
3	Adam Cole and MJF defeated The Jericho Appreciation Society (Daniel Garcia and Sammy Guevara) by pinfall	Blind Eliminator tag team tournament final for a future AEW World Tag Team Championship match	10:45
4	The Golden Elite (Kenny Omega, "Hangman" Adam Page, Matt Jackson, Nick Jackson, and Kota Ibushi) defeated Blackpool Combat Club (Jon Moxley, Claudio Castagnoli, and Wheeler Yuta), Konosuke Takeshita, and Pac by submission	Blood and Guts match	51:15
(c) / – the champion(s) heading into the match

Rampage (aired on tape delay July 21)
No.	Results	Stipulations	Times
1	Darby Allin won by last eliminating Swerve Strickland	20-man Royal Rampage Battle Royal for an AEW TNT Championship match at All Out	28:33
2	The Acclaimed (Anthony Bowens and Max Caster) and Billy Gunn defeated QTV (QT Marshall, Johnny TV, and Aaron Solo) (with Harley Cameron) by pinfall	Six-man tag team match	8:48
3	Kris Statlander (c) defeated Marina Shafir by pinfall	Singles match for the AEW TBS Championship	5:02
(c) / – the champion(s) heading into the match

=== Royal Rampage match entrances and eliminations ===
The Royal Rampage match is a two ring 20-man rumble rules battle royal. Two wrestlers start in each ring, then another wrestler enters every 60 seconds, and goes to his assigned ring (red or blue) until all 20 have entered (10 per ring). Eliminations occur by being going over the top rope. The final two wrestlers in each ring then consolidate into a single ring, and the last wrestler remaining is declared the winner.

– Blue Ring
– Red Ring
– Winner

Draw	Entrant	Order	Eliminated by	Elimination(s)
1	Darby Allin	—	Winner	3
2	Swerve Strickland	19	Darby Allin	2
3	Jay Lethal	1	Ethan Page	0
4	Nick Wayne	17	Swerve Strickland	2
5	Minoru Suzuki	3	The Butcher	1
6	Brian Cage	16	Nick Wayne	2
7	Ethan Page	2	Minoru Suzuki	1
8	Komander	9	Big Bill	1
9	The Butcher	5	Bishop Kaun	1
10	Big Bill	14	Swerve Strickland	2
11	The Blade	6	Toa Liona	0
12	Isiah Kassidy	4	Brian Cage	0
13	Toa Liona	18	Darby Allin	2
14	Matt Sydal	7	Brian Cage	0
15	Bishop Kaun	15	Darby Allin and Nick Wayne	2
16	Matt Hardy	13	Big Bill	1
17	Matt Menard	10	Toa Liona	0
18	Jeff Jarrett	12	Matt Hardy	0
19	Angelo Parker	11	Bishop Kaun	0
20	Jake Hager	8	Komander	0

=== Blind Eliminator Tag Team Tournament ===
In June 2023, AEW announced a men's tag team tournament consisting of eight teams that would begin that summer to determine the #1 contenders to the AEW World Tag Team Championship. The rules of the tournament were that the teams would be paired at random via a blind draw, which was conducted on and off screen by Renee Paquette and RJ City. The winners received an AEW World Tag Team Championship match on the July 29, 2023 episode of Collision. The tournament began on July 5, airing live on AEW Dynamite, with the finals taking place on the July 19 episode of Dynamite.

Quarterfinals; Dynamite (July 5, 2023); Rampage 100 (July 7, 2023)
Adam Cole and MJF	Pin
Matt Menard and The Butcher	8:50
Matt Sydal and Trent Beretta	12:24
Big Bill and Brian Cage	Pin
Darby Allin and Orange Cassidy	Pin
Keith Lee and Swerve Strickland	11:16
Matt Hardy and Jeff Jarrett	7:38
Daniel Garcia and Sammy Guevara	Pin

Semifinals; Dynamite (July 12, 2023)
Adam Cole and MJF	Pin
Big Bill and Brian Cage	10:14
Darby Allin and Orange Cassidy	12:55
Daniel Garcia and Sammy Guevara	Pin

Final; Dynamite: Blood & Guts (July 19, 2023)
Adam Cole and MJF	Pin
Daniel Garcia and Sammy Guevara	10:45
