= Blood & Guts (2025) =

All Elite Wrestling television special

- Promotional poster featuring The Death Riders, The Conglomeration, Darby Allin, and Roderick Strong, with the Blood and Guts structure in the background
- Promotion: All Elite Wrestling
- Date: November 12, 2025
- City: Greensboro, North Carolina
- Venue: First Horizon Coliseum
- Attendance: 5,017
- Tagline: One cage. Two rings. Three words…

Blood & Guts chronology
← Previous; 2024	Next → 2026

AEW Dynamite special episodes chronology
← Previous; Fright Night Dynamite	Next → Thanksgiving Eve Dynamite

The 2025 Blood & Guts was a professional wrestling television special produced by All Elite Wrestling (AEW). It was the fifth annual Blood & Guts event and took place on November 12, 2025, at the First Horizon Coliseum in Greensboro, North Carolina. The event was broadcast live as a special episode of AEW's flagship weekly television program, Wednesday Night Dynamite, simulcast on TBS and HBO Max, with an expanded runtime of 2.5 hours.

The event was based around the Blood and Guts match, AEW's version of the WarGames match, a type of steel cage match in which two teams fight inside a roofed cell structure that surrounds two rings placed side-by-side. The 2025 edition featured the first-ever women's Blood and Guts match in AEW. This was also the first edition of the event to be held during autumn as it is typically held during summer.

== Production ==
=== Background ===
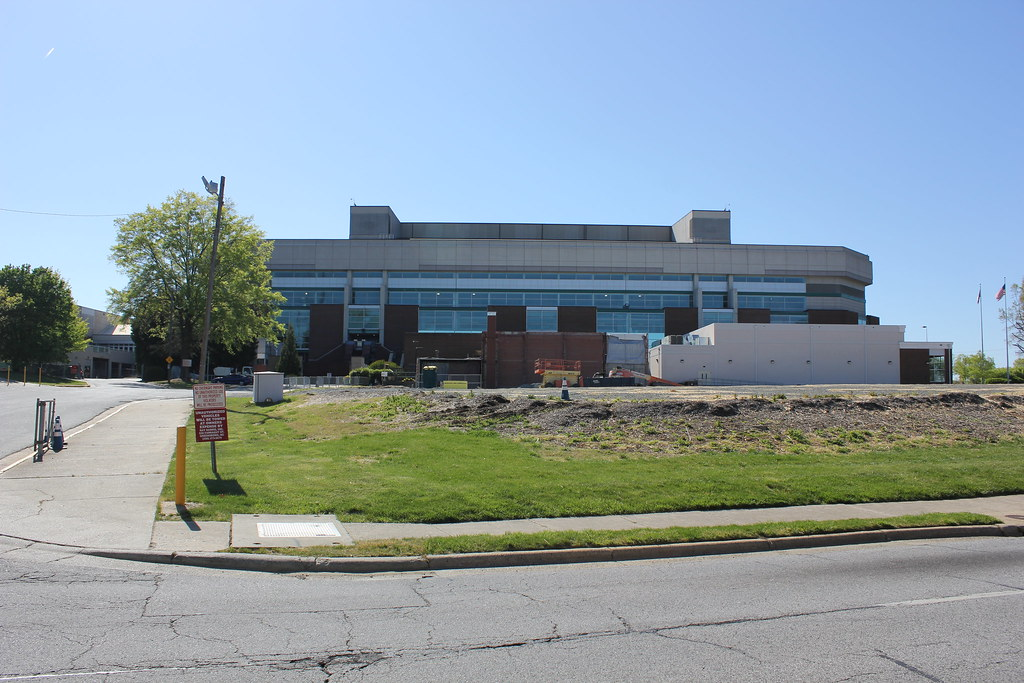
The 2025 Blood & Guts was held at the First Horizon Coliseum in Greensboro, North Carolina.

Other on-screen personnel
Role	Name
Commentators	Excalibur
Commentators	Tony Schiavone
Commentators	Bryan Danielson
Ring announcer	Justin Roberts
Referees	Aubrey Edwards
Referees	Bryce Remsburg
Referees	Mike Posey
Referees	Paul Turner
Referees	Rick Knox
Interviewer	Renee Paquette

Blood & Guts is an annual professional wrestling television special produced by the American promotion All Elite Wrestling (AEW) since 2021. The event typically airs as a mid-year special episode of the company's flagship weekly program, Wednesday Night Dynamite. The concept of the event comes from the Blood and Guts match, which is AEW's version of the classic WarGames match in which two teams fight inside a roofed cell structure that surrounds two rings placed side-by-side and is contested as the main event match of the card.

On September 30, 2025, AEW announced that the fifth annual Blood & Guts would air live as the November 12, 2025, episode of Dynamite, simulcast on TBS and HBO Max, and it would be held at the First Horizon Coliseum in Greensboro, North Carolina. While prior events were held mid-year, the 2025 edition was the first to take place in the latter part of the year. Additionally, this event was the first in AEW to feature a women's Blood & Guts match, and it was also the first event to feature a WarGames-style match at the First Horizon Coliseum (formerly the Greensboro Coliseum) since World Championship Wrestling's Great American Bash house show tour on August 10, 1991. Tickets for the event went on sale October 3.

This was AEW's third event at the venue, following the 2021 Holiday Bash and 2024 Revolution. Wrestling legend Ricky Steamboat appeared at the event. Ric Flair was also in attendance for the event, but did not make his planned televised appearance due to experiencing pain from a recent rotator cuff injury.

=== Storylines ===
Blood & Guts featured professional wrestling matches that involved different wrestlers from pre-existing scripted feuds and storylines. Storylines were produced on AEW's weekly television programs, Dynamite and Collision.

For several weeks, both Jamie Hayter and Queen Aminata had been fighting members of Triangle of Madness (Julia Hart, Skye Blue, and Thekla). Following the main event of the September 27 episode of Collision, a brawl occurred and Hayter and Aminata subsequently challenged Triangle of Madness to the first-ever women's Blood and Guts match in AEW. The match was then made official on September 30, with the remainder of the teammates later revealed on November 1. On November 5, it was revealed that Mina Shirakawa would be replacing Queen Aminata in the match, due to an injury the latter had been nursing for some time.

== Results ==
No.	Results	Stipulations	Times
1	Triangle of Madness (Julia Hart, Skye Blue, and Thekla), Megan Bayne, Marina Shafir, and Mercedes Moné defeated Jamie Hayter, Kris Statlander, Babes of Wrath (Willow Nightingale and Harley Cameron), and Timeless Love Bombs ("Timeless" Toni Storm and Mina Shirakawa) by surrender (Note: Storm surrendered on Shirakawa's behalf.)	Women's Blood and Guts match	46:10
2	"Hangman" Adam Page defeated Powerhouse Hobbs by pinfall	Falls count anywhere match	14:15
3	Darby Allin, Roderick Strong, and The Conglomeration (Mark Briscoe, Orange Cassidy, and Kyle O'Reilly) defeated Death Riders (Jon Moxley, Claudio Castagnoli, Wheeler Yuta, Daniel Garcia, and Pac) by submission	Men’s Blood and Guts match	54:10
