= Blood & Guts (2022) =

All Elite Wrestling television special

- Promotional poster featuring various AEW wrestlers
- Promotion: All Elite Wrestling
- Date: June 29, 2022
- City: Detroit, Michigan
- Venue: Little Caesars Arena
- Attendance: 13,000

Blood & Guts chronology
← Previous; 2021	Next → 2023

AEW Dynamite special episodes chronology
← Previous; Road Rager	Next → Fyter Fest

AEW Rampage special episodes chronology
← Previous; Road Rager	Next → Fyter Fest

The 2022 Blood & Guts was the second annual Blood & Guts professional wrestling television special produced by All Elite Wrestling (AEW). It was held on June 29, 2022, at Little Caesars Arena in Detroit, Michigan. The event aired as a special episode of AEW's primary weekly television program, Wednesday Night Dynamite, which aired live on TBS. The July 1 episode of Friday Night Rampage on TNT, which was a special episode titled Royal Rampage and was the inaugural Royal Rampage, was also taped the same night immediately after the live broadcast of Blood & Guts.

== Production ==
Other on-screen personnel
Role	Name
Commentators	Excalibur (both shows)
Commentators	Tony Schiavone (first 4 matches & Rampage)
Commentators	Taz (Dynamite)
Commentators	Jim Ross (Blood and Guts match & Rampage)
Commentators	William Regal (Blood and Guts match)
Ring announcer	Justin Roberts
Referees	Bryce Remsburg
Referees	Paul Turner
Referees	Aubrey Edwards
Referees	Rick Knox
Referees	Stephon Smith
Interviewers	Tony Schiavone
Interviewers	Alex Marvez
Interviewers	Mark Henry

=== Background ===
In May 2021, the American professional wrestling promotion All Elite Wrestling (AEW) aired a special episode of their weekly program, Wednesday Night Dynamite, titled Blood & Guts; it was originally scheduled for March 2020 but was postponed due to the COVID-19 pandemic. The event took its name from the Blood and Guts match, which debuted at the event and is AEW's version of the WarGames match, but using the classic format from Jim Crockett Promotions and not the modern format used by rival company, WWE, which also owns the trademark to the "WarGames" name. The name "Blood and Guts" itself was a reference to a 2019 quote made by WWE executive chairman Vince McMahon in an earnings call, who had said that although their product was going to become edgier, "we're not going to go back to the Attitude Era, and we're not going to do blood and guts and things of that nature such as being done on perhaps a new potential competitor". The term "blood and guts" used by McMahon was perceived as a reference to rival promotion AEW.

On June 1, 2022, AEW announced that Blood & Guts would return as the June 29 episode of Dynamite at the Little Caesars Arena in Detroit, Michigan, which would air live on TBS, thus establishing Blood & Guts as an annual television special for the company—the prior year's special aired on TNT, but Dynamite moved to TNT's sister channel TBS in January 2022. Additionally, it was announced that the July 1 episode of Friday Night Rampage would be taped immediately after the live broadcast of Blood & Guts and would air on tape delay on TNT as a special episode titled Royal Rampage.

=== Storylines ===
Blood & Guts featured professional wrestling matches that involved different wrestlers from pre-existing scripted feuds and storylines. Wrestlers portrayed heroes, villains, or less distinguishable characters in scripted events that built tension and culminated in a wrestling match or series of matches. Storylines were produced on AEW's weekly television programs, Dynamite and Rampage, the supplementary online streaming shows, Dark and Elevation, and The Young Bucks' YouTube series Being The Elite.

== Reception ==
=== Television ratings ===
Blood & Guts averaged 1.023 million television viewers on TBS and a 0.36 rating in AEW's key demographic.

== Results ==
Dynamite (aired June 29)
No.	Results	Stipulations	Times
1	Orange Cassidy defeated Ethan Page (with Dan Lambert) by pinfall	Singles match	11:00
2	Luchasaurus (with Christian Cage) defeated Serpentico by pinfall	Singles match	0:55
3	Danhausen and FTR (Cash Wheeler and Dax Harwood) defeated Max Caster and Gunn Club (Austin Gunn and Colten Gunn) (with Anthony Bowens and Billy Gunn) by pinfall	Six-man tag team match	9:35
4	Jade Cargill (c) (with Stokely Hathaway and Kiera Hogan) defeated Leila Grey by pinfall	Singles match for the AEW TBS Championship	1:55
5	Eddie Kingston, Santana, Ortiz, and Blackpool Combat Club (Jon Moxley, Claudio Castagnoli, and Wheeler Yuta) (with William Regal) defeated Jericho Appreciation Society (Chris Jericho, Jake Hager, Sammy Guevara, Daniel Garcia, Matt Menard and Angelo Parker) (with Tay Conti) by submission	Blood and Guts match	46:45
(c) / – the champion(s) heading into the match

Rampage (aired July 1)
No.	Results	Stipulations	Times
1	Brody King won by last eliminating Darby Allin	20-man Royal Rampage Battle Royal for a future Interim AEW World Championship match	22:46
2	The Young Bucks (Matt Jackson and Nick Jackson) (with Brandon Cutler) defeated Bishamon (Hirooki Goto and Yoshi-Hashi) by pinfall	Tag team match	10:37
3	Toni Storm defeated Nyla Rose (with Marina Shafir) by pinfall	Singles match	9:48

=== Royal Rampage match entrances and eliminations ===
The Royal Rampage match is a two ring 20 man rumble rules battle royale. 10 wrestlers in each ring separately, in which it starts with two wrestlers on each ring, then another wrestler enters in alternating red or blue ring at time intervals every minute. Eliminations by over the top rope. The final two standing wrestlers on each ring will face off on any of the 2 rings under battle royal rules to declare a winner.

– Blue Ring
– Red Ring
– Winner

Draw	Entrant	Order	Eliminated by	Elimination(s)
1	Tony Nese	1	Darby Allin	0
2	Powerhouse Hobbs	12	Keith Lee	1
3	"Hangman" Adam Page	16	Brody King	1
4	Darby Allin	19	Brody King	3
5	Ricky Starks	15	"Hangman" Adam Page	3
6	The Butcher	18	Darby Allin	3
7	John Silver	2	Ricky Starks	0
8	Max Caster	3	Swerve Strickland	0
9	Rush	5	Penta Oscuro	1
10	The Blade	17	Darby Allin	4
11	Penta Oscuro	4	Rush	1
12	Swerve Strickland	14	The Butcher and the Blade	2
13	Keith Lee	13	Ricky Starks	1
14	Matt Hardy	6	The Butcher and the Blade	0
15	Dustin Rhodes	9	Powerhouse Hobbs and Ricky Starks	0
16	Frankie Kazarian	7	The Blade	0
17	Dante Martin	8	Brody King	0
18	Konosuke Takeshita	10	The Butcher and the Blade	0
19	Brody King	—	Winner	3
20	Orange Cassidy	11	Swerve Strickland	0
