= Jamie Hayter =

English professional wrestler (born 1995)

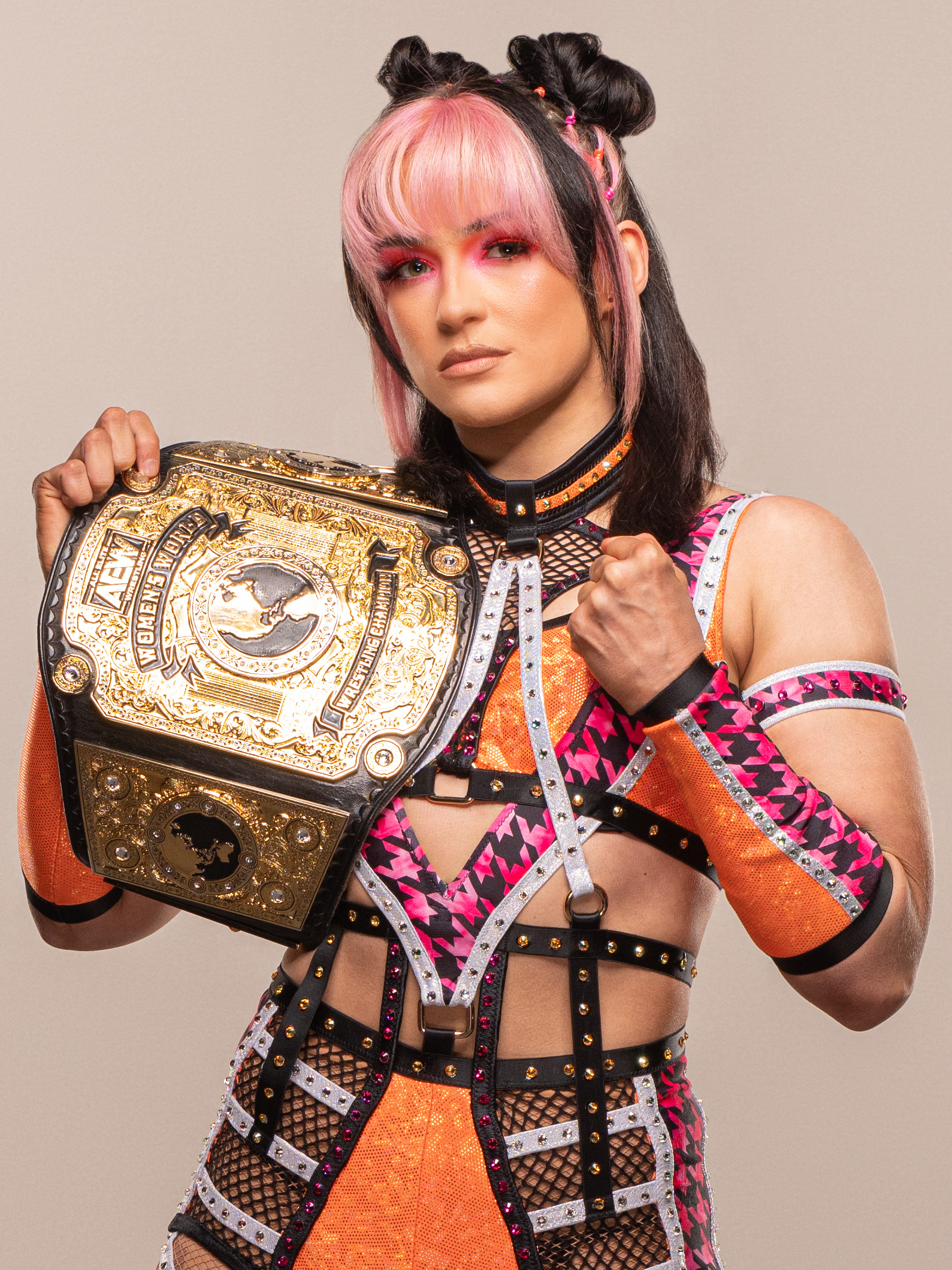
- Hayter as the AEW Women's World Champion in March 2023

Personal information
- Born: Paige Wooding; 23 April 1995 (age 31) Eastleigh, Hampshire, England

Professional wrestling career
- Ring name: Jamie Hayter
- Billed height: 5 ft 8 in (173 cm)
- Billed weight: 143 lb (65 kg)
- Billed from: Southampton, England
- Debut: 2 May 2015

Paige Wooding (born 23 April 1995), better known by her ring name Jamie Hayter, is an English professional wrestler. She is signed to All Elite Wrestling (AEW), where she is a member of United Empire and is one-half of the tag team Brawling Birds with Alex Windsor. She is a former AEW Women's World Champion and AEW Women's World Tag Team Champion.

Hayter has also wrestled internationally with stints in England's RevPro, where she became a two-time RevPro British Women's Champion, and Japan's Stardom, where she became a one-time SWA World Champion and a one-time Goddesses of Stardom Champion (alongside Bea Priestley).

== Early life ==
Paige Wooding was born in Eastleigh on 23 April 1995. She grew up in nearby Southampton.

== Professional wrestling career ==
=== Early career (2015–2019) ===
Wooding made her debut on 2 May 2015, adopting the ring name Jamie Hayter and losing to Jinny Couture. In 2017, she wrestled for Pro Wrestling Chaos in the tournament to crown the first Maiden of Chaos Champion; after defeating Dahlia Black in the quarterfinals, she was eliminated by Martina in the final. On 4 October 2018, Hayter defeated Ayesha Raymond to win the WWW Women's Championship.

In November 2018, Hayter competed in Pro Wrestling Eve's annual tournament event named "She-1", a round robin block tournament which is styled after New Japan Pro Wrestling's G1 tournament. Hayter became the "Ace of Eve" after defeating Toni Storm and Kris Wolf in the finals.

On the 15 May 2019 episode of NXT UK, Hayter made her first appearance for WWE as an enhancement talent, losing to Piper Niven in a squash match.

=== Revolution Pro Wrestling (2015–2021) ===
In June 2015, Hayter debuted at Revolution Pro Wrestling in the RevPro Contenders 11 event defeating Zoe Lucas. In mid-2018, Hayter defeated Jinny to win the RevPro British Women's Championship for the first time in her career. On 28 July, Hayter made her first successful defence of the British Women's Championship against Zoe Lucas. On 5 August, Hayter made her second successful defence of title against Bobbi Tyler. On 18 November, Hayter made her third successful defence of title against Kimber Lee. She lost the title to Zoe Lucas in her fourth defence on 2 December. She would regain the title on 7 February 2021, defeating Gisele Shaw. Revpro would vacated the title on 27 June 2021 when Hayter accepted an offer from WWE for a try-out the same date RevPro hosted a show.

=== World Wonder Ring Stardom (2018–2020) ===
In August 2018, Hayter made her Stardom debut by entering the 2018 5 Star Grand Prix. Hayter scored a total of five points, which was not enough to advance to the finals. In early 2019, Hayter joined the stable Oedo Tai run by Kagetsu. In January 2020, Hayter and Bea Priestley became the first foreign team to win the Goddesses of Stardom Championship, and Hayter would seven days later capture her first world title, defeating Utami Hayashishita for the SWA World Championship. However, she vacated the title in September 2020 since she was unable to work in Japan due to COVID-19 restrictions.

=== All Elite Wrestling (2019, 2021–present) ===
==== Sporadic appearances (2019) ====
On 23 October episode of AEW Dynamite, Hayter made her debut for All Elite Wrestling (AEW), losing to Britt Baker. During an interview backstage, Hayter was attacked by Brandi Rhodes. On 6 November, Hayter picked up her first win teaming with Emi Sakura taking on Riho and Shanna. Hayter was set to work more with AEW whilst wrestling in Japan; however, because of the COVID-19 pandemic that situation halted plans.

==== Signing and AEW Women's World Champion (2021–2023) ====
Hayter returned to AEW as signed talent on 13 August 2021, during the debut episode of AEW Rampage, assisting Britt Baker in a post-match brawl against Red Velvet and Kris Statlander. Shortly after, it was announced that she had signed with AEW. She then aligned with Baker and her associate Rebel. On 3 November episode of Dynamite, Hayter competed in the TBS Championship Tournament where Hayter defeated Anna Jay in the first round. On Thanksgiving Eve special episode of Dynamite, Hayter lost to Thunder Rosa in the quarterfinals of the tournament. In 2022, Hayter competed in the Owen Hart Foundation Women's Tournament facing Skye Blue in a qualifying match on Rampage which Hayter won. On 11 May episode of Dynamite, Hayter was defeated by Toni Storm in the quarterfinals of the tournament. At Battle of the Belts III, Hayter challenged AEW Women's World Champion Thunder Rosa for the title in a losing effort, and she suffered a broken nose during the match. At All Out, Hayter, Baker, Hikaru Shida and Storm competed against each other to become the interim AEW Women's World Champion, which Hayter lost.

At Full Gear, Hayter defeated Storm to become interim AEW Women's World Champion. On the following episode of Dynamite, Rosa relinquished the lineal title due to injury making Hayter the official and undisputed AEW Women's World Champion. Hayter's first successful title defence was against Shida in the main event of Dynamite special episode Holiday Bash. The match received positive reception from AEW backstage.

In 2023, At Revolution, Hayter defeated Ruby Soho and Saraya in a three-way match to retain her title. After the match, Soho attacked Hayter and joined forces with Saraya and Toni Storm. During this time, Hayter and Baker began feuding with Storm, Soho, and Saraya who were known as the Outcasts. On 3 May episode of Dynamite, Hikaru Shida helped Baker and Hayter to even the odds against the Outcasts. At Double or Nothing, Hayter lost the title to Storm, ending her reign at 190 days. Prior to that match, Hayter suffered an undisclosed injury and would be out indefinitely. In a September 2024 interview with Renee Paquette, Hayter revealed that she had suffered two herniated discs in her back and nearly retired from professional wrestling.

==== Championship pursuits (2024–2025) ====
Following a hiatus that lasted over a year, Hayter made her return to AEW in August 2024 at All In, where she confronted Saraya. On the following episode of Dynamite, Hayter made her in-ring return, defeating Harley Cameron. In September 2024 at Grand Slam, Hayter defeated Saraya, finally ending her feud with the Outcasts. On 13 November episode of Dynamite, Hayter's promo was interrupted by a vignette of Julia Hart, teasing a feud between the two. On 14 December at the Collision edition of Winter is Coming, Hayter was defeated by Willow Nightingale in the International Women's Cup Qualifier. After the match, she was attacked by Hart. On 1 January 2025 at Fight for the Fallen, Hayter was defeated by Hart. On 22 January episode of Dynamite, Hayter defeated Hart in a rematch.

On 29 March episode of Collision, Hayter announced her entry into the women's bracket of the Owen Hart Cup, a tournament where the winner will receive an AEW Women's World Championship match at All In. In the quarterfinal round, Hayter defeated Billie Starkz on 12 April episode of Collision. On 23 April edition of Dynamite, Hayter defeated Kris Statlander to advance to the final round of the tournament on 25 May at Double or Nothing, where she faced Mercedes Moné and lost. On 28 May episode of Dynamite, Hayter was attacked by a debuting Thekla. At All Out on 20 September, Hayter competed in a four-way match for the AEW Women's World Championship, but failed to win. On 18 October at WrestleDream, Hayter defeated Thekla. On 12 November at Blood & Guts, Hayter competed in the first ever women's Blood and Guts match, but her team was defeated. At Worlds End on 27 December, Hayter unsuccessfully challenged Kris Statlander for the AEW Women's World Championship.

==== The Brawling Birds (2026–present) ====
In early 2026, AEW began airing vignettes that showed Hayter and Alex Windsor forming a tag team known as "The Brawling Birds". On April 12 at Dynasty, Hayter failed to win the women's world title from Thekla. At Double or Nothing on May 24, Hayter once again failed to win the women's world title from Thekla in a four-way match also involving Kris Statlander and Hikaru Shida. At All In on 30 August, the Brawling Birds defeated Divine Dominion (Lena Kross and Megan Bayne) to win the AEW Women's World Tag Team Championship. On 26 September at All Out, the Brawling Birds successfully defended their titles against Divine Dominion in a Chicago Street Fight. That same night, the Brawling Birds joined the United Empire after assisting Windsor's real-life husband Will Ospreay fend off the Death Riders during his AEW World Championship defense. On 4 November, the Brawling Birds competed in a six-on-six Blood and Guts match at the namesake event, where their team was victorious. On November 14 at Full Gear, the Brawling Birds lost their titles to Wrathlander (Harley Cameron and Kris Statlander), ending their reign at 76 days.

== Personal life ==
Wooding has been diagnosed with ADHD and has discussed how professional wrestling helped her deal with it. She has cited Saraya as one of her inspirations.

== Championships and accomplishments ==
- All Elite Wrestling
  - AEW Women's World Championship (1 time)
  - AEW Women's World Tag Team Championship (1 time) – with Alex Windsor
- Big League Wrestling
  - BLW Women's Championship (1 time)
- ESPN
  - Ranked No. 19 of the 30 best Pro Wrestlers Under 30 in 2023
- Pro-Wrestling: EVE
  - Pro Wrestling: EVE International Championship (1 time)
- Pro Wrestling Illustrated
  - Ranked No. 4 of the top 250 female singles wrestlers in the PWI Women's 250 in 2023
  - Ranked No. 29 of the top 50 tag teams in the PWI Tag Team 50 in 2020 with Bea Priestley
- Revolution Pro Wrestling
  - RevPro British Women's Championship (2 times)
- Sports Illustrated
  - Ranked No. 6 in the top 10 wrestlers of 2022
- World War Wrestling
  - WWW Women's Championship (1 time)
- World Wonder Ring Stardom
  - Goddesses of Stardom Championship (1 time) – with Bea Priestley
  - SWA World Championship (1 time)
  - 5★Star GP Award (1 time)
    - 5★Star GP Fighting Spirit Award (2019)

| Preceded by Toni Storm | 7th AEW Women's World Champion; 19 November 2022 – 28 May 2023 | Succeeded by Toni Storm |
