= Julia Hart (wrestler) =

American professional wrestler (born 2001)

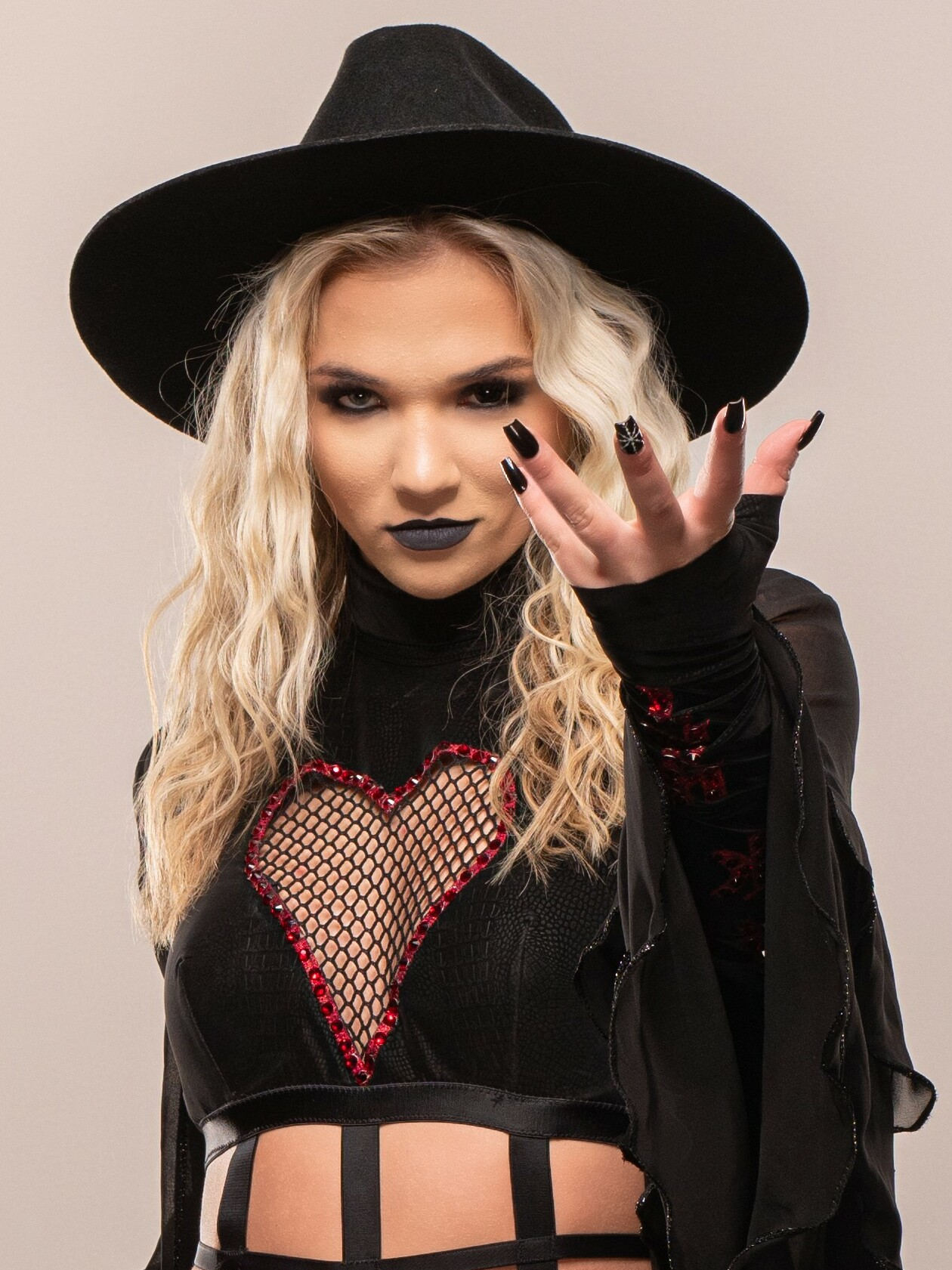
- Hart in December 2022

Personal information
- Born: Julia Hart; November 8, 2001 (age 24) Cambridge, Minnesota, U.S.
- Spouse: Lee Johnson (m. 2023)

Professional wrestling career
- Ring names: Julia; Julia Hart
- Billed height: 5 ft 7 in (1.70 m)
- Billed weight: 149 lb (68 kg)
- Billed from: Bloomington, Minnesota
- Trained by: The Academy SOPW; Ken Anderson; Nightmare Factory; Cody Rhodes; Q. T. Marshall
- Debut: November 22, 2019

Julia Hart (born November 8, 2001) is an American professional wrestler and former cheerleader. She is signed to All Elite Wrestling (AEW), where she is a member of the Triangle of Madness stable and one-half of the tag team Sisters of Sin with Skye Blue. She also appears on partner promotion World Wonder Ring Stardom, where she, along with Thekla and Blue, are the reigning Artist of Stardom Champions in their first reign as a team. She is also a former AEW TBS Champion.

== Background ==
Growing up in Minnesota, Hart was a competitive cheerleader for a period of six years. However, by the time she had graduated from High School, she had become bored and frustrated with it. Feeling that she had already accomplished everything she could within the world of cheerleading, Hart sought to transition to professional wrestling, believing that it could offer her a long-term career.

== Professional wrestling career ==
=== Training (2019–2021) ===
Hart first began training at the Academy SOPW with Ken Anderson in Minnesota. On November 22, 2019, Hart had her debut match against Alyna Kyle, which Hart won. Hart sought additional training at the Nightmare Factory in Georgia, and on March 28, 2021, at their second showcase, Hart took part in a tag match teaming with Spencer Kitz to take on Hyena Hera and Karma Dean; the two lost the match.

=== All Elite Wrestling (2021–present) ===
==== Varsity Blondes (2021–2022) ====
Starting in May 2021, Hart began to work with All Elite Wrestling (AEW), appearing on AEW Dark and AEW Dynamite. Recruited exceptionally early into her professional wrestling career, Hart's first ever match for AEW was only the ninth ever in her career.

Hart aligned with the team of the Varsity Blondes (Brian Pillman Jr. and Griff Garrison) as a cheerleader for several months and was at ringside with them for each of their matches during that time. On the May 25 episode of Dark, Hart earned her first AEW win by pinning Tesha Price. On the September 4 episode of Dark, Hart injured her leg, making her unable to compete in the Casino Battle Royale at All Out. Hart returned to the ring on the September 28 edition of Dark (originally taped on September 11), where she faced Reka Tehaka and beat her by pinfall.

==== House of Black / Hounds of Hell (2022–2025) ====
On the December 8, 2021, episode of Dynamite, Malakai Black spat black mist into Hart's eyes, causing her to wear an eye patch and show signs of opposition to the Varsity Blondes. On the Beach Break special edition of Rampage, Hart faced Jade Cargill in a match for the AEW TBS Championship, but lost. On the April 6, 2022, episode of Dynamite, Hart participated in the Owen Hart Cup where she lost to Hikaru Shida in the qualifying round. At Double or Nothing, Hart officially joined the House of Black by helping them win against Death Triangle in a six-man tag team match, turning heel in the process.

At WrestleDream on October 1, 2023, Hart challenged Kris Statlander for the AEW TBS Championship, which Hart lost, ending her 25-match winning streak. Hart then earned another title shot at Full Gear, defeating Statlander and Skye Blue in a three-way match by pinning Blue, marking the first title win in her career and becoming the youngest champion in AEW history at the age of 22. On the December 16, 2023, edition of Collision, Hart aligned herself with Blue as the duo attacked Abadon, who Hart was feuding with. At Worlds End, Hart retained her title against Abadon with help from Blue.

In January 2024, Hart defended her title against Anna Jay at Battle of the Belts IX. At Dynasty, she lost the title to Willow Nightingale, ending her reign at 155 days. In May, it was reported Hart would go on a hiatus due to a shoulder injury that required surgery. In November 2024, vignettes began airing teasing Hart's return. On December 14 on the Collision edition of Winter Is Coming, Hart made her on-screen return and attacked Jamie Hayter.

On January 1, 2025, at Fight for the Fallen, Hart made her in-ring return and defeated Hayter. On the January 22 episode of Dynamite, a vignette aired of Brody King, Buddy Matthews and Hart stating the break up of the House of Black. On the January 25 episode of Collision, the group was renamed to the Hounds of Hell. On April 6 at Dynasty, Hart was defeated by Mercedes Moné in the quarterfinal of the women's bracket of the 2025 Owen Hart Cup. On the May 21 episode of Dynamite, Hart and Skye Blue reunited and reformed their alliance. On July 12 at All In, Hart participated in the women's Casino Gauntlet match, but failed to win.

==== Triangle of Madness (2025–present) ====
On the July 15 episode of Dynamite, Hart and Blue added Thekla to their alliance after the duo helped her win a $100K four-way match. The trio would go by the name of "Triangle of Madness". Hart and Blue would later adopt the tag team name "Sisters of Sin". In 2025 and 2026, Triangle of Madness would compete in back-to-back Blood and Guts matches, where their team was victorious in 2025 but lost to 2026.

=== World Wonder Ring Stardom (2026–present) ===
On July 15, 2026, Hart was announced as a participant in the World Wonder Ring Stardom's 2026 5Star Grand Prix Tournament as part of Blue Stars A Block. On July 18, Hart, alongside Triangle of Madness stablemates Skye Blue and Thekla, defeated Dream Trine (Hina, Ami Sohrei, and Lady C) to win the Artist of Stardom Championship.

== Persona ==
When Hart began her career in All Elite Wrestling, her character was a straightforward play on her legitimate background in cheerleading. She was initially paired with Brian Pillman Jr and Griff Garrison as the "Varsity Blondes", a group of Varsity athlete characters. After joining the House of Black, Hart took on a gothic witch-like character, which has been described as "Stevie Nicks meets The Undertaker". Hart has also cited Uma Thurman's performance in Kill Bill, as well as the film's soundtrack, as influences on her work.

== Personal life ==
Hart married fellow professional wrestler Lee Johnson on October 13, 2023. She has cited AJ Lee and Alexa Bliss among her favorite wrestlers growing up. In July 2026, Hart shared that she was diagnosed with avoidant/restrictive food intake disorder (ARFID).

== Championships and accomplishments ==
=== Cheerleading ===
- National Cheerleading Championship (2 times)

=== Professional wrestling ===
- All Elite Wrestling
  - AEW TBS Championship (1 time)
- New York Post
  - Female Breakout Wrestler of the year (2023)
- Pro Wrestling Illustrated
  - Ranked No. 105 of the top 250 women's wrestlers in the PWI Women's 250 in 2023
- World Wonder Ring Stardom
  - Artist of Stardom Championship (1 time, current) – with Skye Blue and Thekla
- Wrestling Observer Newsletter
  - Most Improved (2023)
