= Alex Marvez =

American sports journalist

- Born: April 3, 1971 (age 55); The Bronx, New York City, U.S.
- Education: Florida International University (BS)
- Occupations: Sports broadcaster journalist
- Years active: 1989–present
- Employer(s): All Elite Wrestling; Sirius XM NFL Radio

Alex Marvez (born April 3, 1971) is an American sportscaster, journalist and author. He is signed to All Elite Wrestling (AEW), where he works as a backstage interviewer. He also works for Sirius XM NFL Radio, where he hosts a daily primetime radio show.

A former Pro Football Writers of America president, Marvez has covered the NFL since 1995 and worked for the Sporting News, FOX Sports, South Florida Sun-Sentinel, Rocky Mountain News and Dayton Daily News and has a Hall of Fame vote. He worked previously for the Miami Herald, covering the Miami Heat, Florida International University sports and high school sports, along with writing a pro wrestling column starting in 1989. That later continued for Scripps-Howard News Service until he shifted his work focus full-time to the NFL in 2012.

In 2019, Marvez joined the professional wrestling promotion All Elite Wrestling as a play-by-play commentator and became a part of the inaugural broadcast team, alongside Jim Ross and Excalibur. As of October 2019, Marvez began doing backstage interviews for AEW and helps work with the production team in a variety of different roles.

He appears in the 2011 sports documentary series A Football Life and played himself in the 2014 movie Draft Day.
