= Anthony Bowens =

American professional wrestler

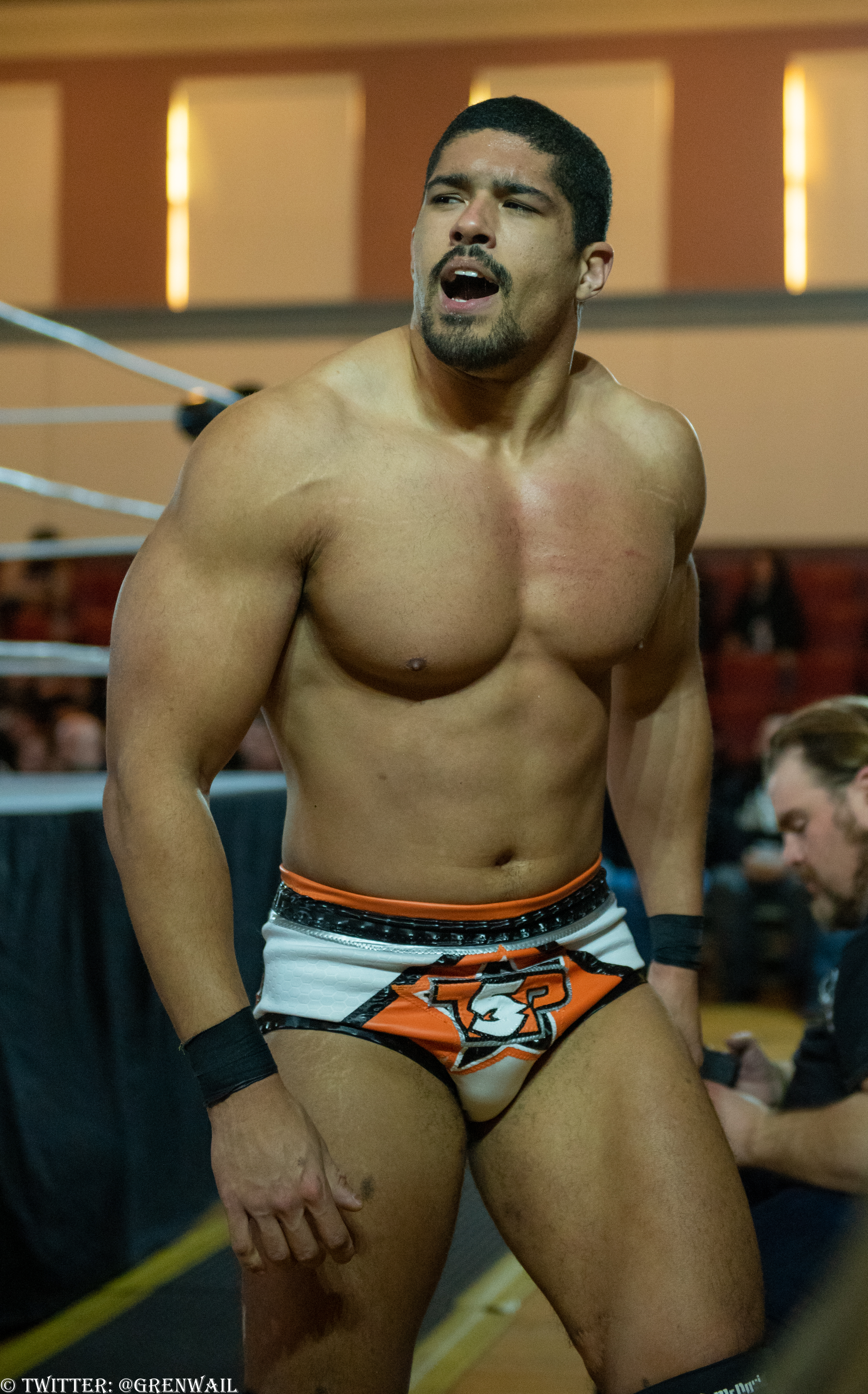
- Bowens in 2020

Personal information
- Born: December 18, 1990 (age 35) Nutley, New Jersey, U.S.
- Education: New York University

Professional wrestling career
- Ring name: Anthony Bowens
- Billed height: 5 ft 10 in (178 cm)
- Billed weight: 205 lb (93 kg)
- Billed from: Nutley, New Jersey; Los Angeles, California
- Trained by: Christopher Daniels; Dan Maff; Pat Buck
- Debut: 2016

Anthony Bowens is an American professional wrestler. He is currently signed to All Elite Wrestling (AEW), where he is a former one-time AEW World Tag Team Champion and one-time AEW World Trios Champion as a former member of The Acclaimed. He is also a former member of The Opps.

== Early life ==
Bowens was born in Nutley, New Jersey. He attended Nutley High School and Montclair State University. He played baseball for eleven years, including at Montclair State and Seton Hall University, playing two seasons each for the Pirates and Red Hawks. He was discovered by professional wrestler Santino Marella, who asked him whether he had ever thought about professional wrestling. He went on to train under Pat Buck.

== Professional wrestling career ==
=== Early career (2016–2020) ===
Bowens made his professional wrestling debut in 2016. On the December 21, 2016 episode of WWE NXT, Bowens and John Ortagun faced The Authors of Pain (Akam and Rezar) in a tag team match. Bowens suffered a concussion during the match when Ortagun was dropped onto Bowens' head.

After a five-month hiatus due to injury, Bowens resumed working for New Japan Pro-Wrestling and on the New England independent scene for promotions like Beyond Wrestling and Combat Zone Wrestling, while also making appearances for Total Nonstop Action Wrestling and Florida Championship Wrestling. He captured the WrestlePro Gold Championship twice between 2016 and 2017. On January 21, 2017, Bowens challenged Drew Galloway for the WCPW World Heavyweight Championship at Battle Club Pro's Fight Forever event, which marked the first time the title had been defended outside of the UK.

=== All Elite Wrestling (2020–present) ===
In November 2020, All Elite Wrestling (AEW) President Tony Khan announced that Bowens, alongside Max Caster, had been signed to a five-year contract with the promotion. The announcement also stated that Bowens and Caster would compete as a tag team named The Acclaimed, and went on to establish themselves as heels. In May 2022, Bowens underwent knee surgery, sidelining him for several months. During this time Bowens, still attended AEW shows and performed his regular promos, although did not wrestle and was using a wheelchair; Caster would subsequently team increasingly with the Gunns, with whom they had forged an alliance. Bowens returned from injury at the Dynamite: Blood and Guts. Their alliance with the Gunns broke down and turned into a rivalry in mid-2022, leading to a "Dumpster Match" in August 2022, which the Acclaimed won. While Billy Gunn was initially caught between the two groups, his sons turned on him, having joined the Firm, leading to him becoming the Acclaimed's manager. In the latter half of 2022, the Acclaimed entered a feud with tag team champions Swerve in our Glory (Swerve Strickland and Keith Lee). At All Out of that year the Acclaimed challenged for tag team championships, although Strickland and Lee retained. After All Out, The Acclaimed turned face due to the favorable crowd reactions they would receive.

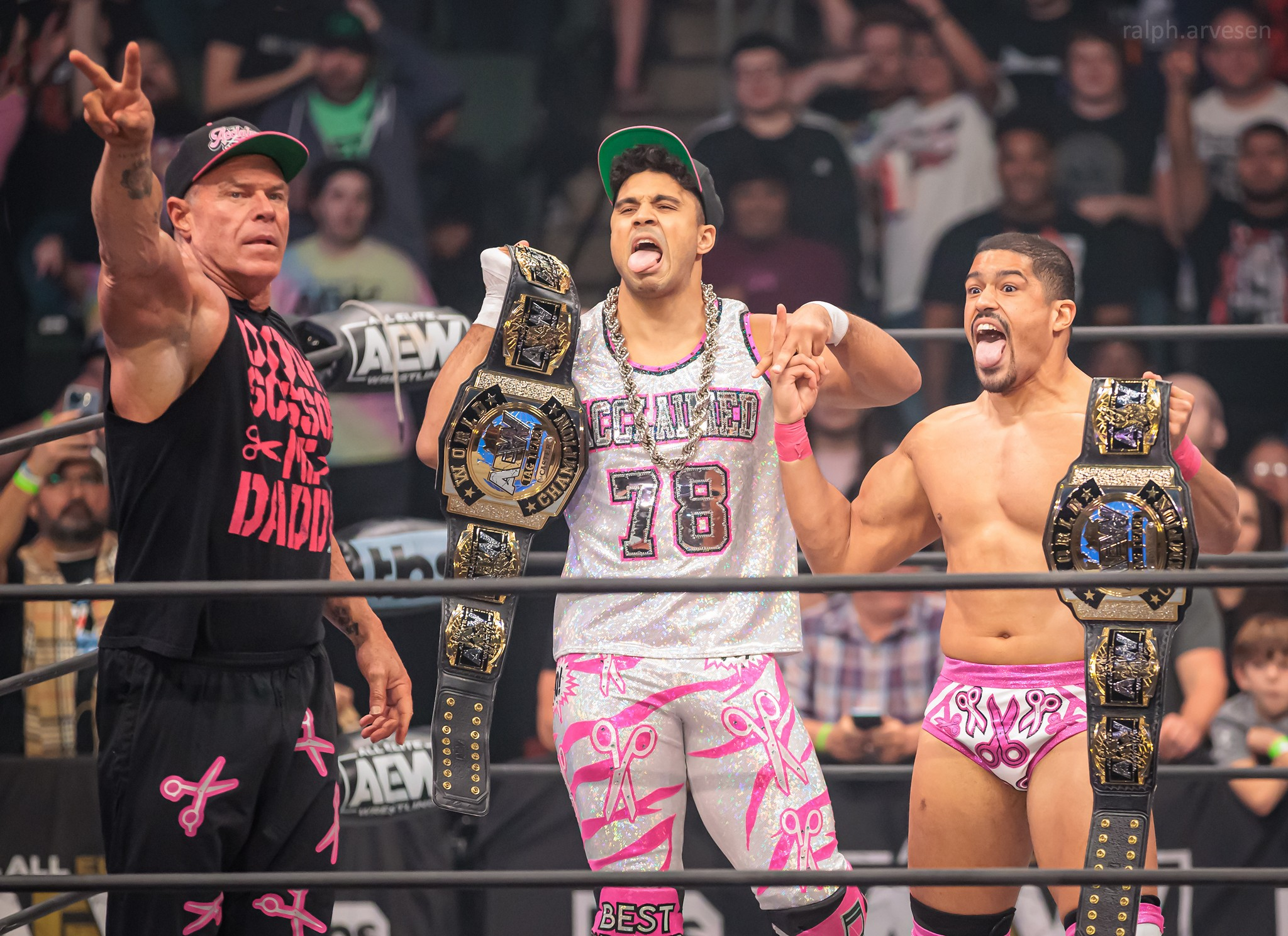
Billy Gunn, Max Caster and Bowens in 2022 during the Acclaimed's AEW World tag team title reign

At the 2022 AEW Grand Slam, The Acclaimed won the AEW World Tag Team Championship. This made Bowens the first openly gay wrestler to win a championship in AEW. During this run, they would feud with, and eventually lose the titles to The Gunn Club. They would also end up forming an alliance with Billy Gunn, Austin and Colten Gunn's biological father, where he was affectionately referred to as "Daddy Ass". Bowens, Castor, and Billy would go on to defeat The House of Black to become AEW World Trios Champions. At Dynasty: Zero Hour on April 21, 2024, ROH World Six-Man Tag Team Champions Bullet Club Gold (Jay White, Austin Gunn and Colten Gunn) defeated Bowens, Castor, and Billy for the AEW World Trios Championship in a winner takes all championship unification match to unify the titles as the Unified World Trios Championship, ending their reign at a record 238 days. The Acclaimed then began a feud with The Young Bucks, defeating them on the June 19 episode of Dynamite, in an eliminator match to earn a future shot at the AEW World Tag Team Championship. The Acclaimed were also a part of Team AEW that defeated The Elite in a Blood and Guts match on July 24 at the namesake event. On the August 14 episode of Dynamite, The Acclaimed's title match against The Young Bucks ended in a disqualification loss due to interference from FTR. On August 25 at All In, The Acclaimed once again failed to win the titles from The Young Bucks in a three-way tag team match, also involving FTR. In November 2024, tension between The Acclaimed began to rise as Caster began to act more arrogant and put himself over the group. In January 2025 on the Maximum Carnage special episode of Collision, Bowens chose to side with Billy over Caster, which resulted in Caster disbanding The Acclaimed.

On April 6 at Dynasty Zero Hour, Bowens defeated Caster in a squash match. On July 12 at All In, Bowens competed in the men's Casino Gauntlet match. which was won by MJF. On the July 26 episode of Collision, Bowens began teasing a heel turn after assaulting Caster following their match, and had to be held back by Billy Gunn. On the September 27 episode of Collision, Bowens and Caster temporarily reunited to defeat The Swirl (Blake Christian and Lee Johnson). Bowens later quietly ended his partnership with Gunn as Gunn took time off to heal from a back injury. For the rest of the year, Bowens and Caster would begin teasing a potential reunion and teamed up against various opponents. In early 2026, Bowens began associating himself with The Opps (Samoa Joe, Hook, and Katsuyori Shibata) as a potential new member of the stable and would officially join on April 25, 2026 at the Collision: Playoff Palooza, turning heel in the process.

== Personal life ==
Bowens is openly gay. He is a supporter of the San Francisco Giants, and previously worked in the production department of the MLB Network studio.

== Championships and accomplishments ==
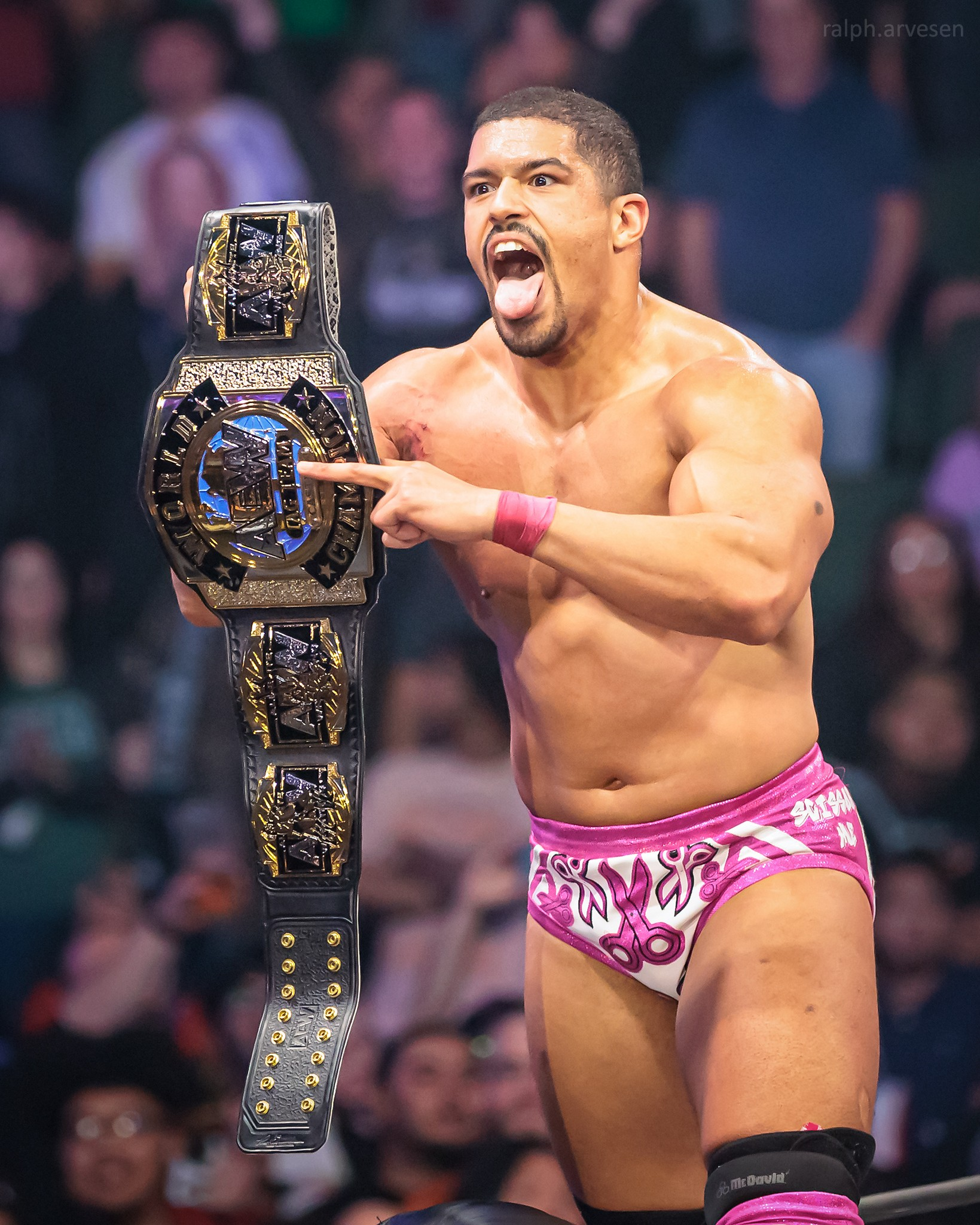
Bowens is a one-time AEW World Tag Team Champion

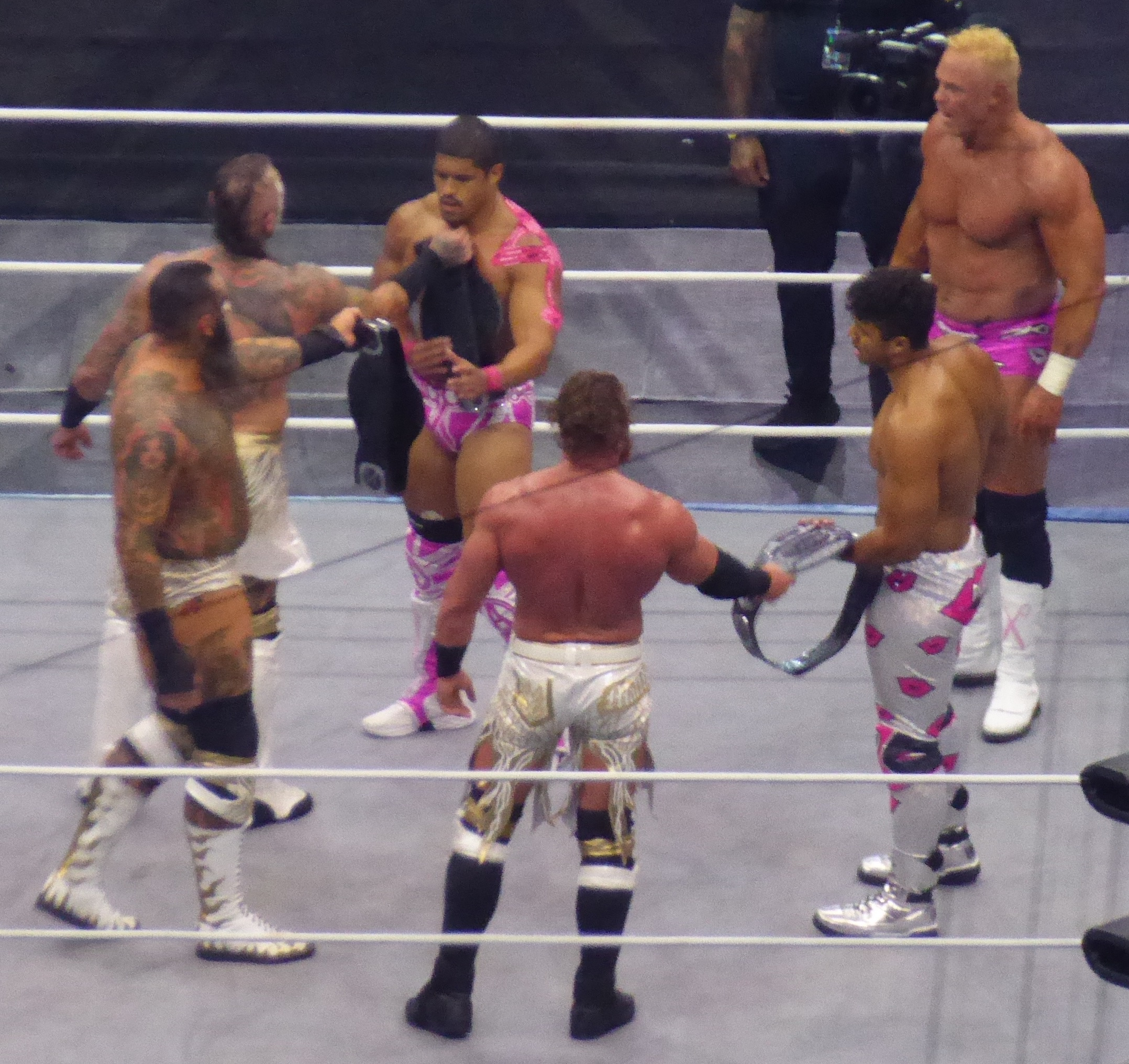
Bowens (center, back) as AEW World Trios Champion in August 2023.

- All Elite Wrestling
  - AEW World Tag Team Championship (1 time) – with Max Caster
  - AEW World Trios Championship (1 time) – with Max Caster and Billy Gunn
- Battle Club Pro
  - BCP Franchise Championship (1 time)
- Independent Wrestling Federation
  - IWF Junior Heavyweight Championship (1 time)
- New York Post
  - Male Breakout Wrestler of the Year (2022) shared with Max Caster
- Pro Wrestling Illustrated
  - Ranked No. 304 of the top 500 singles wrestlers in the PWI 500 in 2021
- WrestlePro
  - WrestlePro Gold Championship (3 times)
  - Dream 16 Tournament (2019)
- Wrestling Observer Newsletter
  - Most Improved (2022) with Max Caster as The Acclaimed
  - Worst Feud of the Year (2025) vs. Max Caster

Preceded by Swerve Strickland and Keith Lee	9th AEW World Tag Team Champion; September 21, 2022 – present With: Max Caster	Succeeded by The Gunn Club (Austin Gunn and Colten Gunn)
