= Skye Blue =

American professional wrestler (born 1999)

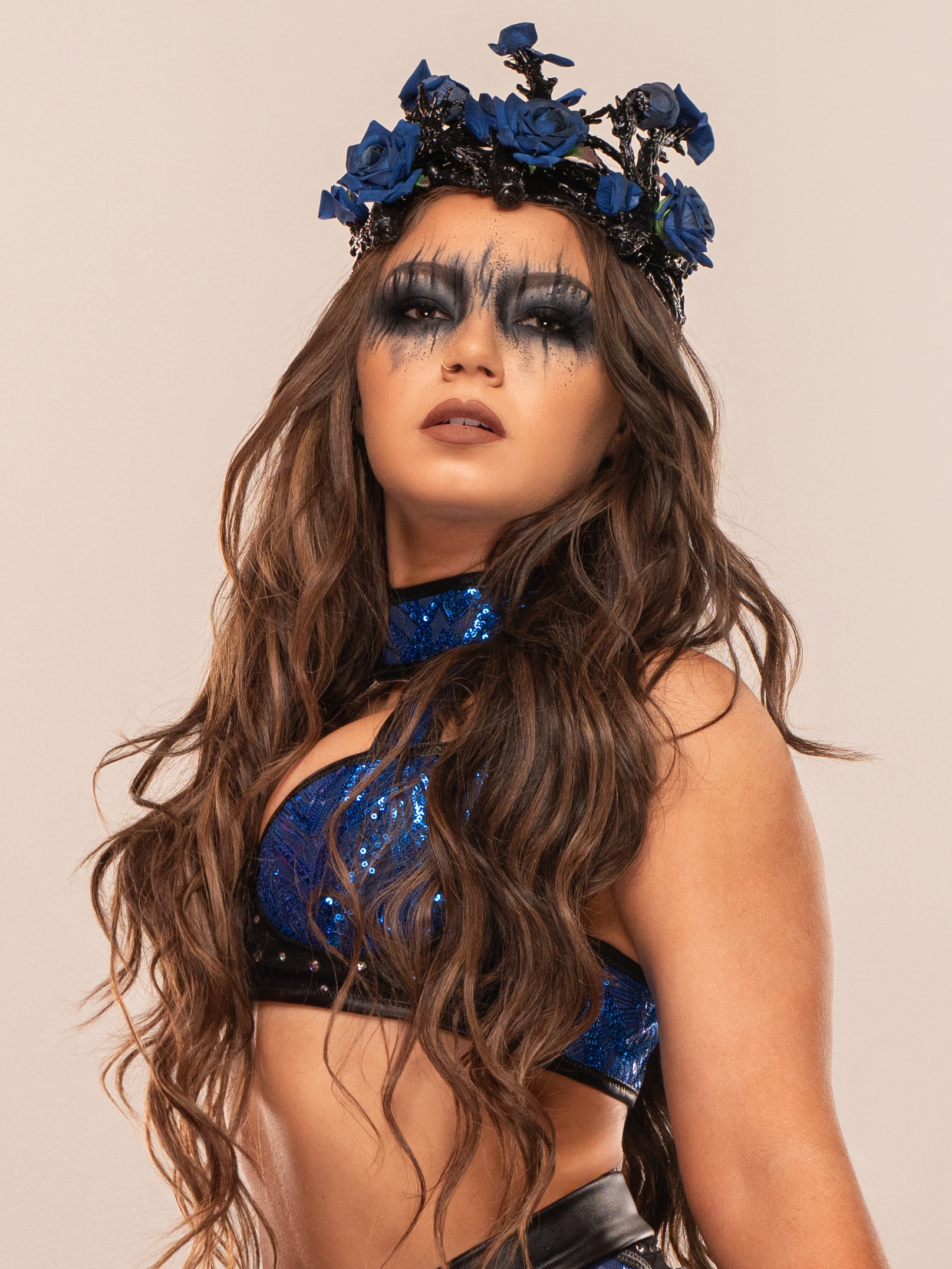
- Blue in November 2023

Personal information
- Born: Skylar Dolecki; October 2, 1999 (age 27) Chicago, Illinois, U.S.
- Life partner: Kyle Fletcher

Professional wrestling career
- Ring name: Skye Blue
- Billed height: 5 ft 2 in (1.57 m)
- Billed weight: 110 lb (50 kg)
- Billed from: Chicago, Illinois
- Trained by: Premier Academy; Randy Ricci
- Debut: 2017

Skylar Dolecki (born October 2, 1999) is an American professional wrestler. She is signed to All Elite Wrestling (AEW), where she performs under the ring name Skye Blue. She is a member of Triangle of Madness and one-half of the Sisters of Sin. She also wrestles for Ring of Honor (ROH), World Wonder Ring Stardom, and Pro-Wrestling: EVE where she is the current Spirit of EVE Champion in her first reign. In Stardom she, along with Thekla and Julia Hart, are the reigning Artist of Stardom Champions in their first reign as a team.

Blue has also appeared on National Wrestling Alliance (NWA) as well as various independent shows such as AAW: Professional Wrestling Redefined, where she once held the AAW Women's Championship, and she is a former Warrior Wrestling Women's Champion.

== Professional wrestling career ==
=== Early career (2017–2021) ===
Blue debuted in 2017, wrestling on the independent circuit in Illinois, having her first match in Premier Pro Wrestling (PPW) against Sierra.

=== All Elite Wrestling / Ring of Honor (2021–present) ===
==== Championship pursuits (2021–2023) ====
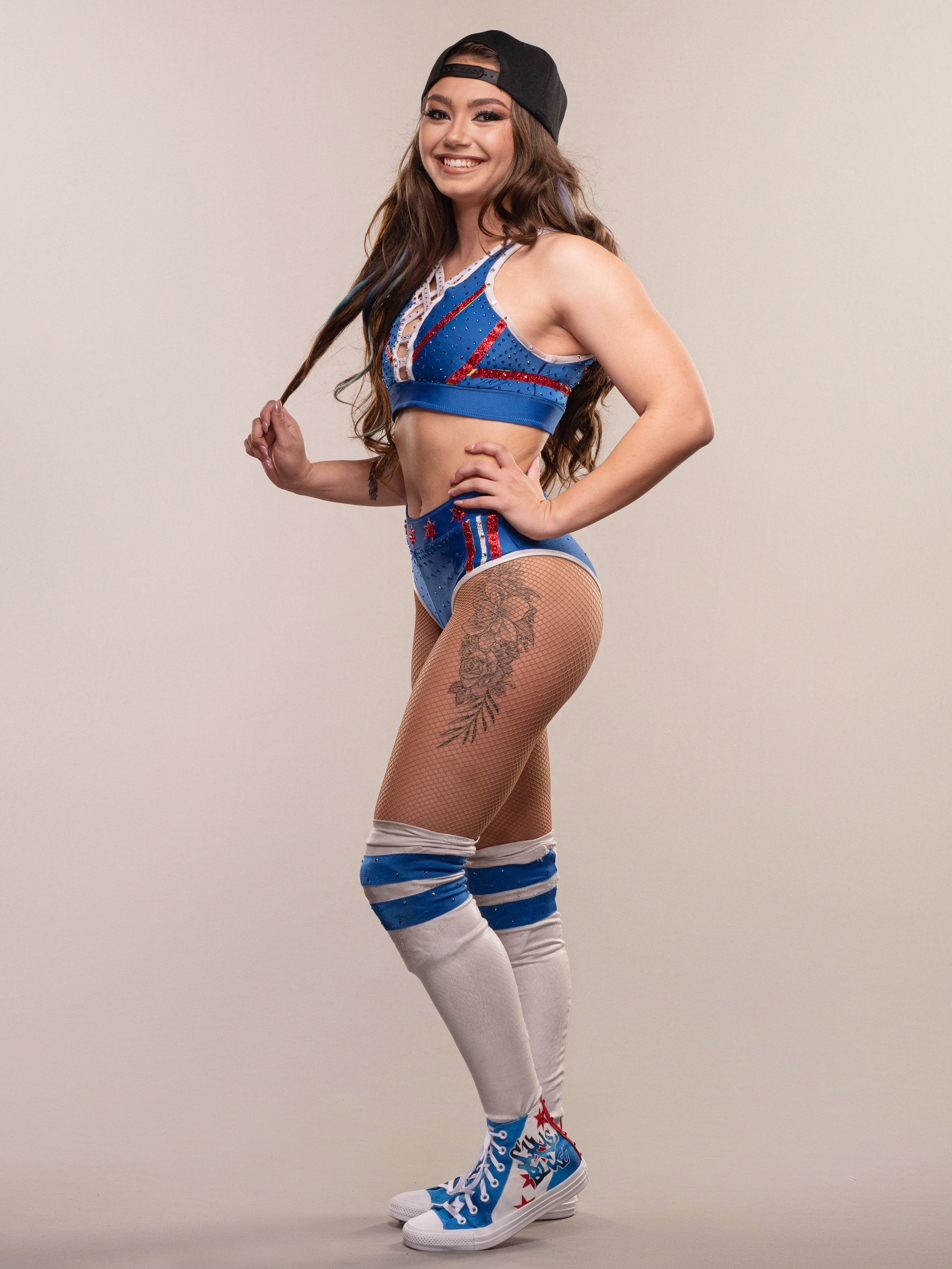
Blue in her original persona in August 2022

Blue made her All Elite Wrestling (AEW) debut on the April 7, 2021, episode of AEW Dark: Elevation, where she lost to Britt Baker. On September 3, she made her AEW Dark debut losing to Red Velvet. On September 5, she made her pay-per-view debut, competing in the Casino Battle Royale at All Out. On October 6, she debuted on AEW Rampage, losing to Jade Cargill. On January 19, 2022, Blue debuted on AEW Dynamite, losing to Serena Deeb. On the April 2 episode of AEW Rampage, Blue competed in the Owen Hart Foundation Women's Tournament, losing to Jamie Hayter in a qualifying match. On the August 12 episode of Rampage, Blue and Dante Martin challenged Sammy Guevara and Tay Melo for the AAA World Mixed Tag Team Championship, but were unsuccessful.

On January 6, 2023, at Battle of the Belts V, Blue challenged Jade Cargill for the AEW TBS Championship, but was unsuccessful.

Blue made her Ring of Honor (ROH) debut on the March 2, 2023, episode of ROH on Honor Club, where she and Madison Rayne defeated The Renegades (Charlette Renegade and Robyn Renegade).

On April 7, it was announced that Blue has signed full time with AEW. On the June 9 episode of Rampage, Blue defeated Dr. Britt Baker, D.M.D., Mercedes Martinez and Nyla Rose in a four-way match to become the number one contender for the AEW Women's World Championship. On the May 11 episode of the televised ROH episode, during the main event, Blue challenged Athena for the ROH Women's World Championship, but was unsuccessful. On the June 14 episode of Dynamite Blue challenged the Women's World Champion Toni Storm for the title. During the match, which saw Storm spraying Blue's mom in the face with a green spray, Blue had Storm pinned, but the referee was distracted by Storm's ally Ruby Soho. Storm would later submit Blue to retain the title. On June 17, at the premiere episode of Collision, Blue teamed up with the NJPW Strong Women's Champion Willow Nightingale to defeat Soho and Storm. On the June 23 episode of Rampage, Blue competed in the Owen Hart Foundation Women's Tournament, defeating Anna Jay A.S. in the quarterfinals of the tournament.

==== Sisters of Sin (2023–present) ====
On the September 23, 2023, edition of AEW Collision, Julia Hart of the House of Black would spray a black mist from her mouth into Blue's eyes. Over the course of the following weeks, Blue's appearance and demeanor would begin to gradually change; she began wrestling a much more aggressive style in the ring while donning heavy black makeup around her eyes. The storyline would escalate on the November 1 edition of Dynamite with Julia Hart seeming willing to align with Skye Blue, but Skye answered by spraying blue mist into the eyes of Hart. Nonetheless, Blue's demeanor remained altered. On the December 16, 2023, edition of Collision, Blue turned heel and aligned with Hart by joining her in attacking Abadon until a returning Thunder Rosa made the save.

On the May 29, 2024, episode of Dynamite, Blue unsuccessfully challenged Mercedes Moné for the AEW TBS Championship. On the July 20 episode of Collision, Blue suffered an ankle injury during her match against Hikaru Shida, later revealed to be a broken ankle, sidelining her indefinitely. On September 6 at All Out Zero Hour, Blue, on crutches, made a surprise appearance, where she would be attacked by Women's World Champion Mariah May, who would be chased off by Queen Aminata.

Blue returned from injury on May 14, 2025, at Dynamite: Beach Break, competing in a four-way match that was won by Mina Shirakawa. The following week on Dynamite, Blue reunited with Julia Hart and reformed their alliance. On the July 16 episode of Dynamite, Blue and Hart added Thekla to their alliance after the duo helped her win a $100K four-way match. The trio would later form a stable called "Triangle of Madness". Blue and Hart would later adopt the tag team name "Sisters of Sin". In 2025 and 2026, Triangle of Madness would compete in back-to-back Blood and Guts matches, where their team was victorious in 2025 but lost to 2026.

=== World Wonder Ring Stardom (2026–present) ===
On July 18, 2026, Blue made her World Wonder Ring Stardom debut, alongside Triangle of Madness stablemates Julia Hart and Thekla, defeated Dream Trine (Hina, Ami Sohrei, and Lady C) to win the Artist of Stardom Championship.

== Wrestling persona ==
During her time on the Independent circuit and initially in All Elite Wrestling, the character of Skye Blue was that of a bubbly, energetic, good-natured girl-next-door. This led to comparisons to Roxanne Perez and to Bayley during their time in NXT. However, following a storyline involving Julia Hart that began in September 2023, Skye Blue became a darker, brooding, more aggressive character.

== Personal life ==
Blue graduated from Fenton High School in Bensenville, Illinois. She is in a relationship with fellow wrestler Kyle Fletcher.

== Championships and accomplishments ==
Blue is a one-time Artist of Stardom Champion.

- AAW Wrestling
  - AAW Women's Championship (1 time)
- Chicago Style Wrestling
  - CSW Women's Championship (1 time)
- Global Professional Wrestling
  - GPW Battle Royal Champion (1 time)
- Pro Wrestling Illustrated
  - Ranked No. 74 of the top 150 female singles wrestlers in the PWI Women's 150 in 2021
- Pro Wrestling ZERO1 USA
  - ZERO1 USA Women's Championship (1 time)
- Pro Wrestling: EVE
  - Spirit of EVE Championship (1 time, current)
- Warrior Wrestling
  - Warrior Wrestling Women's Championship (1 time)
- World Wonder Ring Stardom
  - Artist of Stardom Championship (1 time, current) – with Julia Hart and Thekla
