= Aubrey Edwards =

American professional wrestling referee

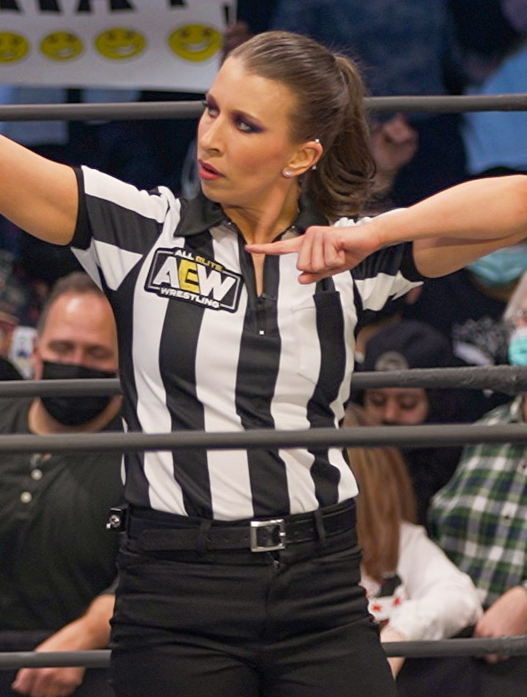
- Edwards on AEW Dynamite in 2022

Personal information
- Born: Brittany Aubert; March 9, 1987 (age 39) Bethesda, Maryland, U.S.
- Education: DigiPen Institute of Technology (BSCS)

Professional wrestling career
- Ring name(s): Aubrey Edwards; Gearl Hebner
- Trained by: Chris Samuels; Steve West
- Debut: 2017

Brittany Aubert (born March 9, 1987), better known by the ring name Aubrey Edwards, is an American video game developer and professional wrestling referee signed to All Elite Wrestling (AEW). She is also the promotion's project coordinator and the co-host of AEW Unrestricted with Will Washington and previously with Tony Schiavone.

== Career ==
=== Video game industry ===
Aubert has a background in software engineering and computer science, having previously worked in the video game industry as a producer. Aubert was previously employed by 5th Cell, where she worked on the Scribblenauts video game series for more than six years. She started out as a tool programmer for the series' inaugural title and eventually became lead producer of the Wii U launch title Scribblenauts Unlimited. Aubert was involved with the development of AEW Games, which led to AEW Fight Forever in 2023.

=== Professional wrestling ===
Aubert joined independent promotion 3–2–1 BATTLE! as a referee, initially going under the ring name Gearl Hebner. She began working with other Washington-based promotions such as DEFY and Without a Cause, using the ring name Aubrey Edwards. In 2018, Edwards made appearances in WWE, working as a referee, first for the Mae Young Classic, and then at WWE Evolution. In August 2019, Edwards made history at AEW's All Out by becoming the first woman to referee a professional wrestling world championship match on pay-per-view. She signed with AEW on September 1, 2019, becoming the promotion's first full-time female referee.

== Other media ==
Aubert made her video game debut as a playable character in AEW Fight Forever.

== Personal life ==
Aubert is bisexual. Before becoming a professional wrestling referee, Aubert practiced classical ballet for 21 years.

== Championships and accomplishments ==
- Attack! Pro Wrestling
  - Attack! 24:7 Championship (1 time)
