= Bryce Remsburg =

American professional wrestling referee

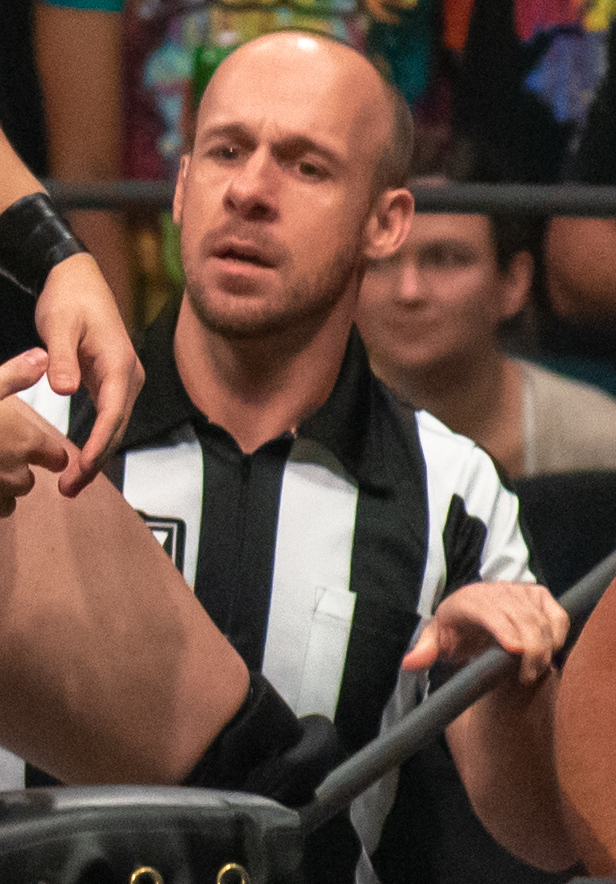
- Remsburg in 2019

Personal information
- Born: January 4, 1982 (age 44) Palmyra, Pennsylvania, U.S.

Professional wrestling career
- Ring name: Bryce Remsburg
- Trained by: Mike Quackenbush; Reckless Youth
- Debut: 2002

Bryce Remsburg (born 4 January 1982) is an American professional wrestling referee signed to All Elite Wrestling (AEW), and has previously worked for Chikara and CMLL.

== Career ==
Remsburg began his career on the independent circuit in Pennsylvania, making his first appearance for Chikara in 2003. He remained at Chikara until the company folded in 2020.

Remsburg made his first pay-per-view appearance for All Elite Wrestling on May 25, 2019, at Double or Nothing. He has consistently appeared on the weekly televised Dynamite, Rampage and Collision shows, as well as the former Dark and Dark: Elevation on YouTube.

Remsburg was notably the referee during the All In main event at Wembley Stadium on August 27, 2023.

On January 4, 2025, at a Tokyo Joshi Pro-Wrestling event in Korakuen Hall, Remsburg pinned AEW Senior Vice President Chris Harrington to become the 1,706th Ironman Heavymetalweight Champion. However, he lost the title seconds later to Poison Sawada Julie.

In 2026, Remsburg was involved in a moment which gained some media attention, intentionally delaying a match to allow chants of "Fuck Ice" from the crowd to continue without interruption on the February 5th episode of Dynamite.

== Championships and accomplishments ==
- DDT Pro-Wrestling

- Ironman Heavymetalweight Championship (1 time)
