= Excalibur (wrestler) =

American professional wrestler and commentator

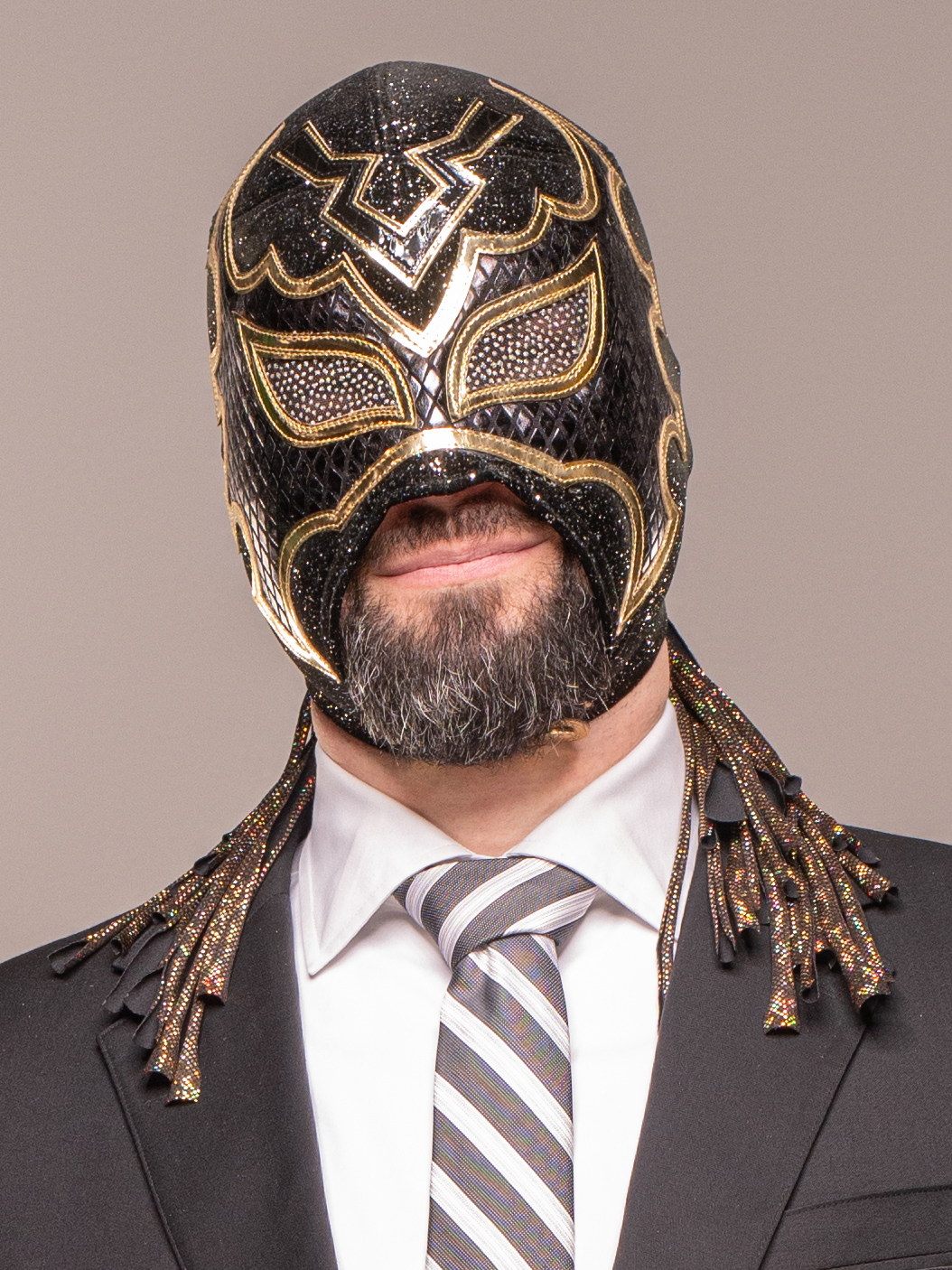
- Excalibur in 2023

Personal information
- Born: Marc Letzmann; July 16, 1980 (age 46) Detroit, Michigan, U.S.

Professional wrestling career
- Ring name: Excalibur
- Billed height: 6 ft 2 in (188 cm)
- Billed weight: 183 lb (83 kg)
- Trained by: Super Dragon
- Debut: January 2000
- Retired: 2007

Marc Letzmann (born July 16, 1980), better known by his ring name Excalibur, is an American professional wrestling commentator and retired professional wrestler. He is signed to All Elite Wrestling (AEW) where he serves as play-by-play commentator on Dynamite, color commentator on Collision and, previously, Rampage. He is also one of the six founders of Pro Wrestling Guerrilla, where he continues to work as the company's "Liaison to the Board of Directors". After retiring from in-ring competition in 2007, he became the company's lead play-by-play commentator.

== Professional wrestling career ==
=== Early career ===
While writing for a wrestling video game website, Excalibur met Super Dragon online. Through chatting online, the two became friends and it helped spark the beginning of Excalibur's career. After spending a year in college, Excalibur chose to move to California to begin his wrestling career and also get work in his full-time profession, graphic design. He cited having an "in" to Revolution Pro Wrestling as the reason he decided to leave his hometown of Detroit. After moving to California in late 1999, Excalibur spent six months living in Super Dragon's garage, until finally renting a place of his own.

=== Pro Wrestling Guerrilla (2003–2008) ===
Excalibur is one of the six owners of Southern California–based Pro Wrestling Guerrilla (PWG), and is collectively known as one of the "PWG Six", in reference to his partial founding of the company. On PWG's debut show, he defeated Chris Bosh. Soon after, Excalibur became a member of the stable SBS with Super Dragon and Disco Machine. While with SBS, Excalibur and Super Dragon won the company's Tag Team Championship from Quicksilver and Chris Bosh. They became the first team in PWG's history to successfully defend the title, but they eventually lost them to Joey Ryan and Scott Lost.

At All Nude Revue, someone dressed as Super Dragon attacked the real Super Dragon after a match. On May 13 at Jason Takes PWG!, it was revealed that Excalibur was the mastermind of the attacks on Super Dragon and that Kevin Steen was the attacker, resulting in Excalibur becoming a heel. After subsequently turning on Super Dragon, Excalibur defeated him in a Guerrilla Warfare Match. After the match, Disco Machine made his way to the ring to aid Super Dragon. On June 11 at Guitarmegeddon, Disco Machine teamed with Super Dragon in a losing effort to Excalibur and Kevin Steen. After the match, Disco turned on Dragon and united with Excalibur and Steen, with the three now calling themselves the "new" SBS. On July 9 at Bicentennial Birthday Extravaganza, the new SBS defeated Dragon, El Generico and Human Tornado in a six-man tag team elimination match. At part two of the event the following night, Excalibur and Disco were unable to win a number one contender's four-team elimination match after Generico pinned Disco. At Zombies Shouldn't Run on August 10, Excalibur and Disco gained an "apprentice" in Ronin, and stated that he would face a test to see if he would be allowed to join the group. After the SBS's scheduled opponents, Los Luchas, did not appear, the SBS and Ronin instead competed against and defeated the team of Top Gun Talwar, Hook Bomberry and Mr. Excitement. At the first-ever Battle of Los Angeles event, the SBS and Chris Sabin lost to Talwar, Bomberry and Human Tornado. However, the SBS won at part two of the event the following night, as they and Ronin defeated Sabin, Bomberry and T. J. Perkins. At part two of All Star Weekend 2: Electric Boogaloo on November 20, 2005, the SBS faced Super Dragon and Davey Richards for the World Tag Team Championship, but lost the match. On the first night of Battle of Los Angeles on September 2, 2006, Excalibur took part in a four-way elimination match for the World Championship that included Petey Williams, Human Tornado and then-champion Joey Ryan. After eliminating Williams, Excalibur was eliminated from the match by Ryan after Williams hit Excalibur with a piledriver. In May 2008, at the end of the DDT4 Night One event, Steen's then-six-month-old son appeared in a segment with Excalibur, in which Excalibur called him "ugly" and it prompted Steen to perform three consecutive package piledrivers on Excalibur before placing his son on top of Excalibur for the pin.

=== Independent circuit, retirement, and return to PWG (2005–present) ===
In addition to PWG, Excalibur began competing for various other promotions. In Combat Zone Wrestling (CZW), he began wrestling mostly tag team matches with Super Dragon as his partner before splitting. Excalibur soon joined Beef Wellington and the duo became a comedic, yet popular, tag team dubbed Team Masturbation. While still in CZW, Excalibur had a short feud with Larry Sweeney, which culminated at Cage of Death 7, where they had an "interpromotional match", in which they performed promos back and forth between each other before competing in the actual match. In addition to his work in CZW, Excalibur performed at Ring of Honor, where he wrestled Super Dragon at the Do or Die show in 2004, and also Chikara, where he competed until his final match in 2006. After his final professional match in 2007, he returned to PWG and became the "Commissioner of Food & Beverage", which was later renamed to the "Liaison to the Board of Directors", as well as the company's lead play-by-play commentator. In 2011 on an episode of Colt Cabana's Art of Wrestling podcast, Excalibur stated that his reason for retiring was due to fearing that the concussions he suffered through his career would cause him to lose years off his life or that his brain would start to deteriorate at an early age.

On July 13, 2018, it was announced Excalibur would commentate the All In broadcast with Don Callis, Sean Mooney, Ian Riccaboni, Alicia Atout, Justin Roberts, and Bobby Cruise. In December he also was on color commentary for New Japan Pro-Wrestling.

=== All Elite Wrestling (2019–present) ===
Excalibur was announced as part of the All Elite Wrestling (AEW) announce team during Episode 10 of "The Road to Double or Nothing," which premiered on April 10, 2019. AEW Executive Vice President Cody Rhodes said the first time he saw Excalibur and the mask, "I don't think I really got it, but if you watch All In back, he truly was the anchor of that show. I definitely get it now." Excalibur was part of the live stream of the Double or Nothing Ticket Announcement Party from Las Vegas, then was part of Double or Nothing starting with the Buy In pre-show, where he did play-by-play. Excalibur, along with Jim Ross and Tony Schiavone, provide play-by-play and color commentary for matches on Dynamite. Excalibur also provided play-by-play for matches on Rampage and Dark.

During his tenure as an AEW commentator Excalibur was named best television announcer by Wrestling Observer Newsletter in 2020, 2021, and 2023.

== Controversies ==
In July 2020, Excalibur became embroiled in controversy following the resurfacing of past videos where he used racial slurs, notably the N-word during pro wrestling promos. These incidents were from earlier in his career when he was associated with independent wrestling promotions.

== Championships and accomplishments ==
- DDT Pro-Wrestling
  - Ironman Heavymetalweight Championship (1 time)
- Indie Wrestling Hall of Fame
  - Class of 2023
- Pro Wrestling Guerrilla
  - PWG Tag Team Championship (1 time) – with Super Dragon
- Pro Wrestling Illustrated
  - Ranked No. 334 of the top 500 wrestlers in the PWI 500 in 2006
- Wrestling Observer Newsletter
  - Best Television Announcer (2020, 2021, 2023)

=== Lucha de Apuestas record ===
Winner (wager)	Loser (wager)	Location	Event	Date	Notes
Excalibur (mask)	Chris Bosh (hair)	Los Angeles, California	Live event	December 13, 2003	
