= St. Patrick's Day Slam (2021) =

All Elite Wrestling television special

- Promotional poster featuring Britt Baker (with Rebel) and Thunder Rosa
- Promotion: All Elite Wrestling
- Date: March 10, 2021 (aired March 17, 2021)
- City: Jacksonville, Florida
- Venue: Daily's Place
- Attendance: N/A

St. Patrick's Day Slam chronology
← Previous; First	Next → 2022

AEW Dynamite special episodes chronology
← Previous; The Crossroads	Next → Blood & Guts

The 2021 St. Patrick's Day Slam was the inaugural St. Patrick's Day Slam professional wrestling television special produced by All Elite Wrestling (AEW). The event took place on March 10, 2021, but aired on tape delay on March 17 at Daily's Place in Jacksonville, Florida. It was broadcast on TNT as a special episode of AEW's weekly television program, Dynamite.

== Production ==
Other on-screen personnel
Role	Name
Commentators	Jim Ross
Commentators	Excalibur
Commentators	Tony Schiavone
Ring announcer	Justin Roberts
Referees	Aubrey Edwards
Referees	Bryce Remsburg
Referees	Paul Turner
Referees	Rick Knox
Interviewer	Alex Marvez

=== Storylines ===
St. Patrick's Day Slam featured professional wrestling matches that involved different wrestlers from pre-existing scripted feuds and storylines. Wrestlers portrayed heroes, villains, or less distinguishable characters in scripted events that built tension and culminated in a wrestling match or series of matches. Storylines were produced on AEW's weekly television program, Dynamite, the supplementary online streaming shows, Dark and Elevation, and The Young Bucks' YouTube series Being The Elite.

=== Background ===
At the event, Christian Cage addressed the reason behind his arrival in AEW.

Through a working relationship with Impact Wrestling this event featured the Impact World Tag Team Champions The Good Brothers as they took on All Elite Wrestling's Jon Moxley and Eddie Kingston.

In the main event, Thunder Rosa faced off against Britt Baker in an unsanctioned Lights Out match, making it the first time an AEW event was headlined by female wrestlers.

== Results ==
No.	Results	Stipulations	Times
1	Cody Rhodes (with Arn Anderson) defeated Penta El Zero Miedo (with Alex Abrahantes)	Singles match	10:08
2	Jade Cargill defeated Dani Jordyn	Singles match	1:12
3	Matt Hardy, The Butcher, The Blade and Private Party (Isiah Kassidy and Marq Quen)) defeated Jurassic Express (Jungle Boy, Luchasaurus and Marko Stunt) and Bear Country (Bear Bronson and Bear Boulder)	Ten-man tag team match	8:47
4	Jon Moxley and Eddie Kingston defeated The Good Brothers (Doc Gallows and Karl Anderson)	Tag team match	9:52
5	Rey Fénix (with Pac) defeated Angélico	Singles match	7:31
6	Thunder Rosa defeated Dr. Britt Baker, D.M.D. (with Rebel)	Unsanctioned Lights Out match	16:37

== See also ==
- 2021 in professional wrestling
