= List of AEW Women's World Champions =

Women's professional wrestling champions

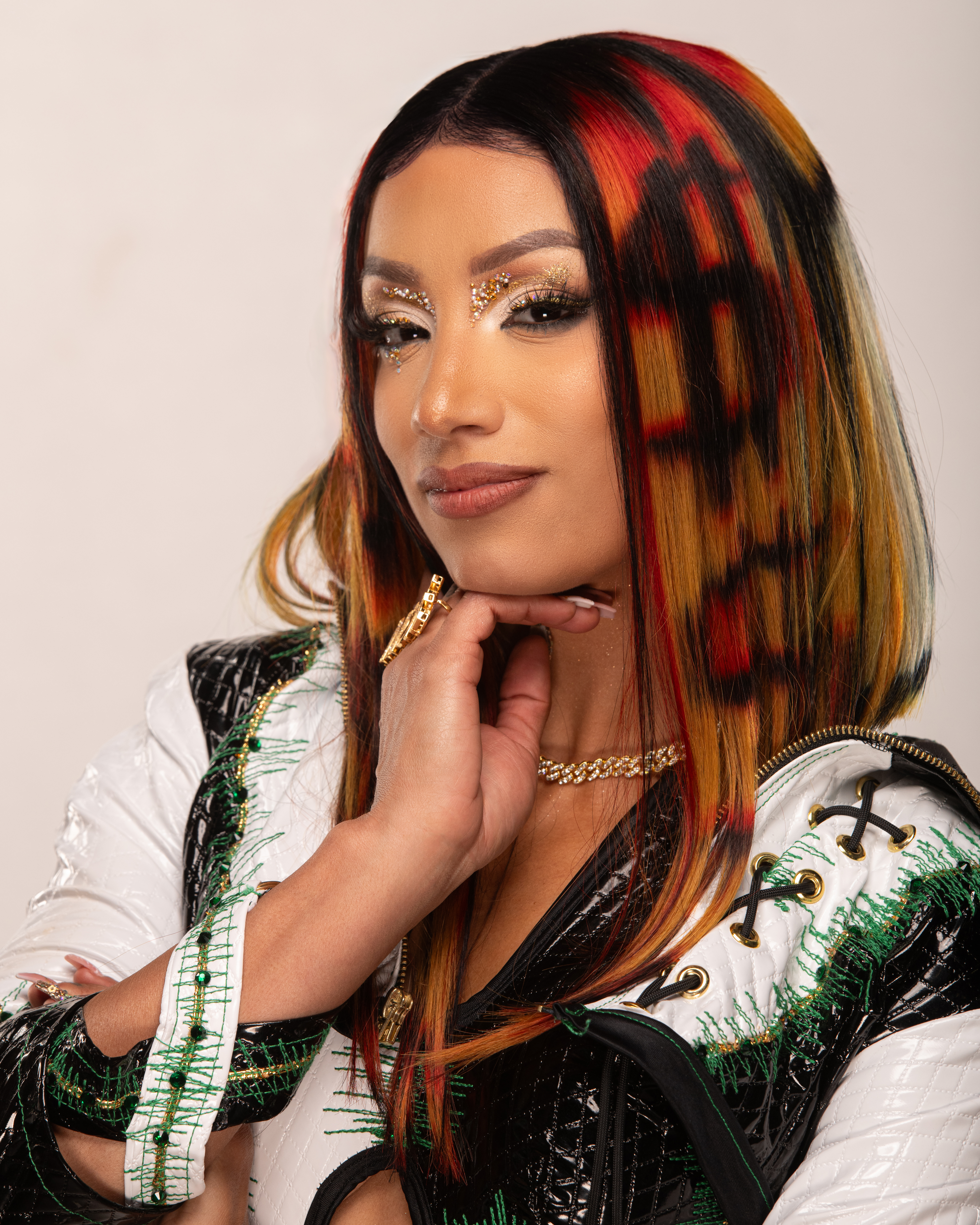
Current champion Mercedes Moné

The AEW Women's World Championship is a women's professional wrestling world championship created and promoted by the American promotion All Elite Wrestling (AEW). Established on October 2, 2019, the inaugural champion was Riho.

As of November 21, 2026, there have been 18 reigns between 13 champions and one vacancy. Riho was the inaugural champion. "Timeless" Toni Storm has the most reigns at four, and she has the longest combined reign at 512 days. Hikaru Shida also has the longest and shortest reigns, with her first reign lasting 372 days and her second reign lasting 25 days. Riho was the youngest champion at 22 years old while Nyla Rose is the oldest champion at 37.

The current champion is Mercedes Moné, who is in her first reign. She won the title by defeating Willow Nightingale at All In on August 30, 2026, in London, England.

== Reigns ==
Key
| No. | Overall reign number |
| Reign | Reign number for the specific champion |
| Days | Number of days held |
| Days recog. | Number of days held recognized by the promotion |
| + | Current reign is changing daily |

| No. | Champion | Championship change | | | Reign statistics | | | Notes | Ref. |
| No. | Champion | Date | Event | Location | Reign | Days | Days recog. | Notes | Ref. |
|---|---|---|---|---|---|---|---|---|---|
| 1 | Riho | October 2, 2019 | Dynamite | Washington, D.C. | 1 | 133 | 133 | Defeated Nyla Rose to become the inaugural champion. | |
| 2 | Nyla Rose | February 12, 2020 | Dynamite | Cedar Park, TX | 1 | 101 | 101 | | |
| 3 | Hikaru Shida | May 23, 2020 | Double or Nothing | Jacksonville, FL | 1 | 372 | 372 | This was a no disqualification, no countout match. | |
| 4 | Dr. Britt Baker, D.M.D. | May 30, 2021 | Double or Nothing | Jacksonville, FL | 1 | 290 | 290 | | |
| 5 | Thunder Rosa | March 16, 2022 | Dynamite: St. Patrick's Day Slam | San Antonio, TX | 1 | 172 | 172 | This was a steel cage match. | |
| — | Vacated | September 4, 2022 | All Out | Hoffman Estates, IL | — | — | — | Lineal champion Thunder Rosa suffered a back injury in late August and an interim champion was crowned at this event. On the November 23, 2022, episode of Dynamite, Rosa relinquished the lineal championship and the subsequent interim reigns were retroactively made official. | |
| 6 | Toni Storm | September 4, 2022 | All Out | Hoffman Estates, IL | 1 | 76 | 76 | Lineal champion Thunder Rosa was originally scheduled to defend the title against Storm at this event but was pulled due to suffering an injury. Storm instead faced and defeated Dr. Britt Baker, D.M.D., Hikaru Shida, and Jamie Hayter in a four-way match to become the interim champion. Due to Rosa forfeiting the lineal title on the November 23, 2022, episode of Dynamite, Storm's interim reign was retroactively made an official reign. | |
| 7 | Jamie Hayter | November 19, 2022 | Full Gear | Newark, NJ | 1 | 190 | 191 | Hayter defeated Toni Storm to win the interim championship. On the November 23, 2022, episode of Dynamite, it was announced that Thunder Rosa had forfeited the lineal championship, making Hayter the undisputed champion. AEW's official title history incorrectly lists her reign as lasting 191 days. | |
| 8 | Toni Storm | May 28, 2023 | Double or Nothing | Paradise, NV | 2 | 66 | 66 | | |
| 9 | Hikaru Shida | August 2, 2023 | Dynamite: 200 | Tampa, FL | 2 | 25 | 25 | | |
| 10 | Saraya | August 27, 2023 | All In | London, England | 1 | 44 | 44 | This was a four-way match, also involving Dr. Britt Baker, D.M.D. and Toni Storm, who Saraya pinned to win the title. | |
| 11 | Hikaru Shida | October 10, 2023 | Dynamite: Title Tuesday | Independence, MO | 3 | 39 | 39 | | |
| 12 | "Timeless" Toni Storm | November 18, 2023 | Full Gear | Inglewood, CA | 3 | 281 | 281 | | |
| 13 | Mariah May | August 25, 2024 | All In | London, England | 1 | 174 | 174 | | |
| 14 | "Timeless" Toni Storm | February 15, 2025 | Grand Slam Australia | Brisbane, Australia | 4 | 217 | 217 | | |
| 15 | Kris Statlander | September 20, 2025 | All Out | Toronto, ON, Canada | 1 | 144 | 144 | This was a four-way match also involving Jamie Hayter and Thekla. | |
| 16 | Thekla | February 11, 2026 | Dynamite | Ontario, CA | 1 | 165 | 165 | This was a Strap match. | |
| 17 | Willow Nightingale | July 26, 2026 | Redemption | Montreal, QC, Canada | 1 | 35 | 35 | | |
| 18 | Mercedes Moné | August 30, 2026 | All In | London, England | 1 | 83+ | 83+ | | |

== Combined reigns ==
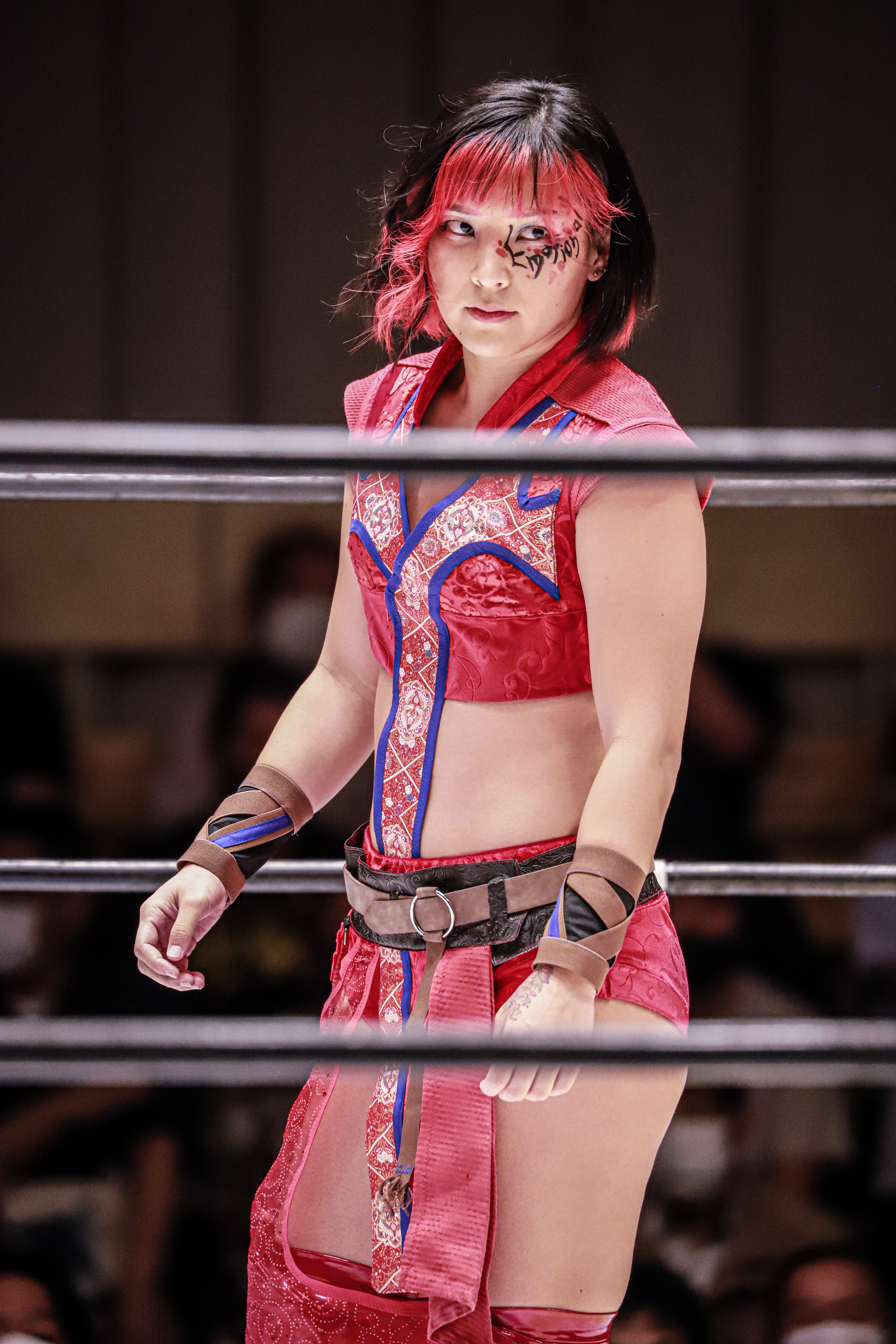
Three-time champion Hikaru Shida, who holds the record of longest reign at 372 days during her first reign.

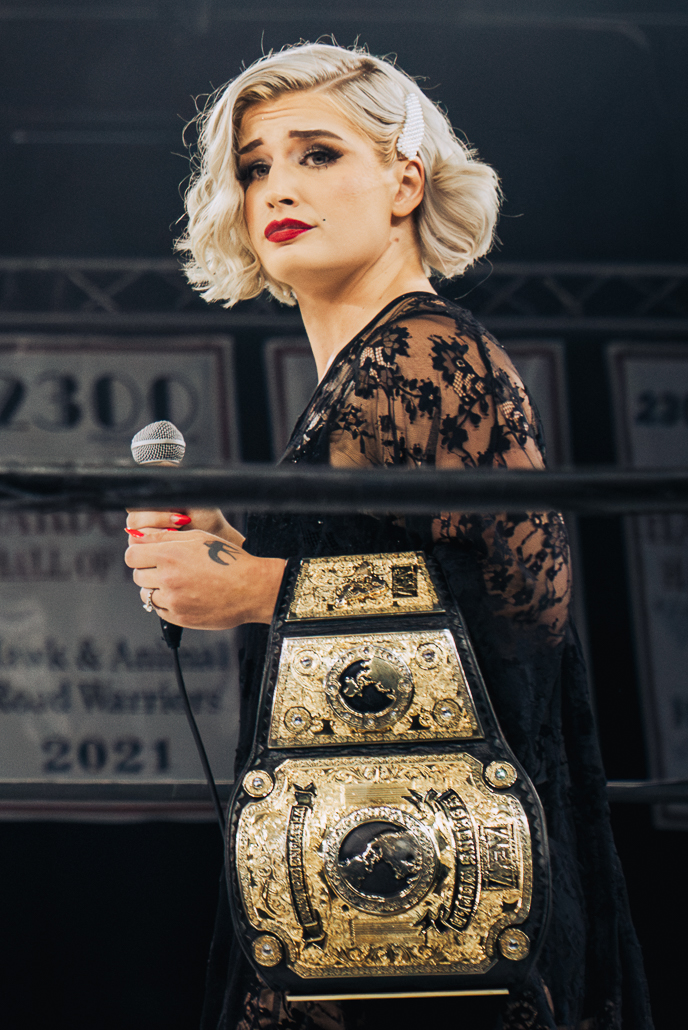
Record-setting four-time and most combined days "Timeless" Toni Storm (she became "Timeless" prior to her third reign).

As of November 21, 2026.

| † | Indicates the current champion |

| Rank | Wrestler | No. of reigns | Combined days | Combined days rec. by AEW |
|---|---|---|---|---|
| 1 | ("Timeless") Toni Storm | 4 | 640 | |
| 2 | Hikaru Shida | 3 | 436 | |
| 3 | Dr. Britt Baker, D.M.D. | 1 | 290 | |
| 4 | Jamie Hayter | 1 | 190 | 191 |
| 5 | Mariah May | 1 | 174 | |
| 6 | Thunder Rosa | 1 | 172 | |
| 7 | Thekla | 1 | 165 | |
| 8 | Kris Statlander | 1 | 144 | |
| 9 | Riho | 1 | 133 | |
| 10 | Nyla Rose | 1 | 101 | |
| 11 | Mercedes Moné † | 1 | 83+ | |
| 12 | Saraya | 1 | 44 | |
| 13 | Willow Nightingale | 1 | 35 | |
