= AEW St. Patrick's Day Slam =

All Elite Wrestling television special series

- AEW St. Patrick's Day Slam logo
- Promotions: All Elite Wrestling
- First event: 2021

AEW St. Patrick's Day Slam is a professional wrestling television special produced by the American promotion All Elite Wrestling (AEW). Established in 2021, the event airs in March as AEW's St. Patrick's Day television special. The first two events aired as special episodes of the promotion's flagship weekly television program, Wednesday Night Dynamite, while the third event was held as a special episode of Friday Night Rampage.

== History ==
On March 10, 2021, All Elite Wrestling (AEW) announced that the March 17 episode of their flagship television program, Dynamite, would be a special episode titled St. Patrick's Day Slam. The St. Patrick's Day television special was taped on March 11 at Daily's Place in Jacksonville, Florida due to the ongoing COVID-19 pandemic.

On March 13, 2022, it was confirmed that St. Patrick's Day Slam would return. The event took place on March 16, for the second year in a row the show was main evented by Britt Baker and Thunder Rosa for the AEW Women's World Championship.

In January 2023, it was confirmed that St. Patrick's Day Slam would return as a special episode of AEW Rampage on March 17, 2023.

== Events ==
#	Event	Date	City	Venue	Main event	Ref.
1	St. Patrick's Day Slam (2021)	Dynamite; March 11, 2021 (aired March 17)	Jacksonville, Florida	Daily's Place	Dr. Britt Baker, D.M.D. vs. Thunder Rosa in an Unsanctioned Lights Out match	
2	St. Patrick's Day Slam (2022)	Dynamite; March 16, 2022	San Antonio, Texas	Freeman Coliseum	Dr. Britt Baker, D.M.D. (c) vs. Thunder Rosa in a Steel Cage match for the AEW Women's World Championship	
3	St. Patrick's Day Slam (2023)	Rampage; March 15, 2023 (aired March 17)	Winnipeg, Manitoba, Canada	Canada Life Centre	Daniel Garcia vs. Brody King	
(c) – refers to the champion(s) heading into the match

=== 2023 ===
St. Patrick's Day Slam (2023)
- Promotional poster featuring several AEW wrestlers
- Promotion: All Elite Wrestling
- Date: March 15, 2023 (aired March 17, 2023)
- City: Winnipeg, Manitoba
- Venue: Canada Life Centre
- Attendance: 7,600

Event chronology
← Previous; 2022	Next → —

List of AEW Rampage special episodes chronology
← Previous; Slam Dunk	Next → Rampage 100

The 2023 St. Patrick's Day Slam was the 3rd annual St. Patrick's Day Slam professional wrestling event produced by All Elite Wrestling (AEW). It took place on March 15, 2023 at the Canada Life Centre in Winnipeg, Manitoba . It was broadcast on TNT as a special episode of AEW's weekly television program Rampage.

==== Results ====
No.	Results	Stipulations	Times
1	Powerhouse Hobbs (with QT Marshall) (c) defeated Rey Fenix (with Alex Abrahantes) by pinfall	Singles match for the AEW TNT Championship	14:00
2	Taya Valkyrie defeated Ava Lawless by pinfall	Singles match	1:17
3	The Jericho Appreciation Society (Matt Menard and Angelo Parker) defeated The Bollywood Boyz (Gurv Sihra and Harv Sihra) by pinfall	Tag team match	5:41
4	Daniel Garcia (with Chris Jericho) defeated Brody King (with Julia Hart) by pinfall	Singles match	12:22
(c) / – the champion(s) heading into the match

== See also ==
- List of All Elite Wrestling special events
- List of AEW Dynamite special episodes
- List of AEW Rampage episodes
