= Winter Is Coming (2026) =

All Elite Wrestling two-part television special

- Promotional poster featuring Persephone, Andrade El Ídolo, Kofi, Bandido, Austin Creed, and Thunder Rosa
- Promotion: All Elite Wrestling
- Date: December 9, 2026
- City: Monterrey, Nuevo Leon, Mexico
- Venue: Arena Monterrey

Winter Is Coming chronology
← Previous; 2025	Next → —

AEW Dynamite special episodes chronology
← Previous; Thanksgiving Eve	Next → Holiday Bash

AEW Collision special episodes chronology
← Previous; Thanksgiving	Next → Holiday Bash

The 2026 Winter Is Coming is an upcoming two-part professional wrestling television special produced by All Elite Wrestling (AEW). It is scheduled to be the seventh annual Winter Is Coming and is scheduled to take place on December 9, 2026, at Arena Monterrey in Monterrey, Nuevo Leon, Mexico and air as special episodes of Wednesday Night Dynamite on TBS and Saturday Night Collision on TNT with both parts being simulcasted on HBO Max, marking the first time that AEW has held the event in Mexico.

== Production ==
=== Background ===
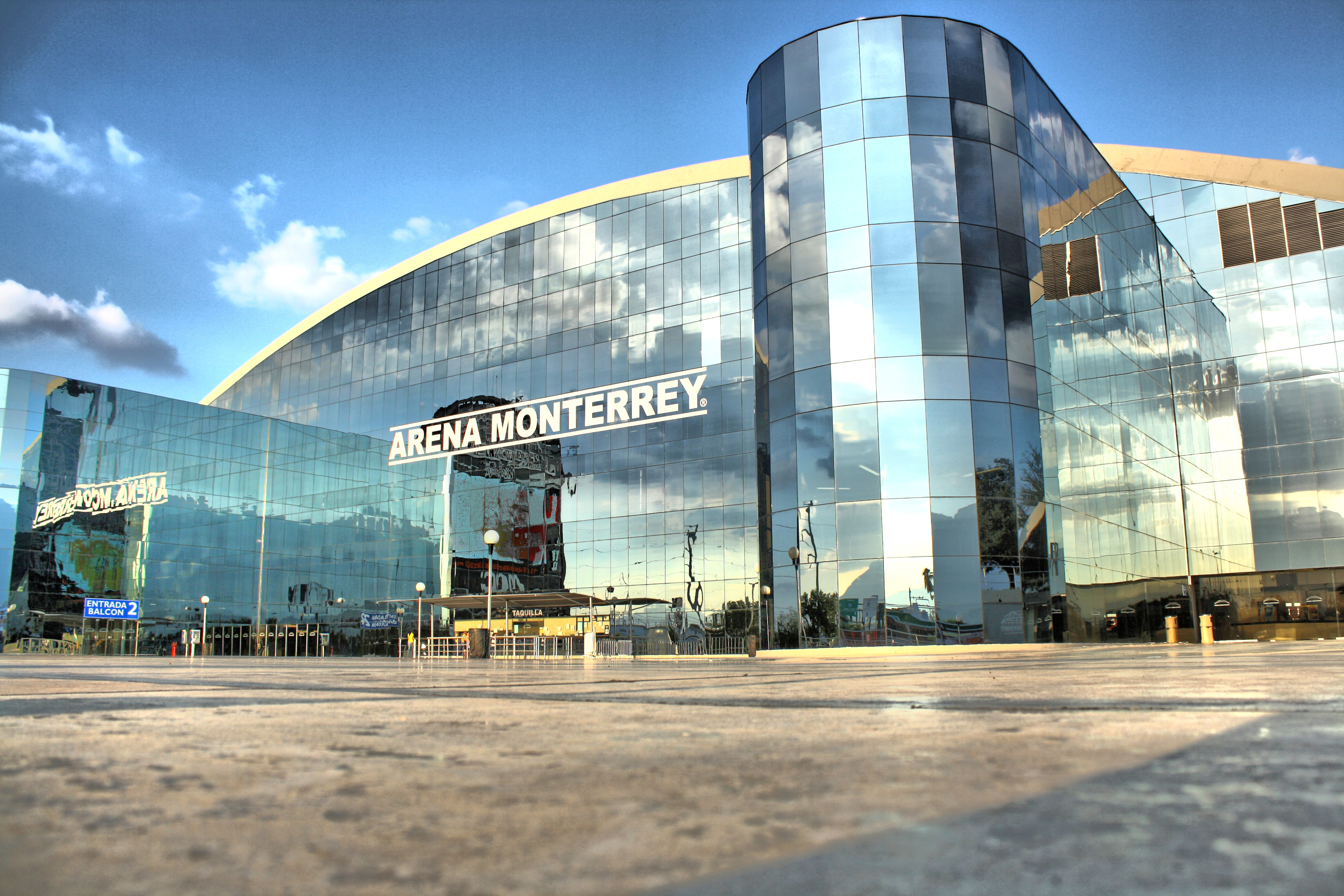
Winter Is Coming is scheduled to take place at Arena Monterrey in Monterrey, Nuevo León, Mexico.

Winter Is Coming is an annual professional wrestling television special held in December by the American company All Elite Wrestling (AEW) since 2020. The title "Winter Is Coming" is derived from Game of Thrones, a television series from HBO, which is part of Warner Bros. Discovery (WBD), which also includes AEW broadcast partners TBS and TNT.

On June 17 and June 18, 2025, AEW held its first events in Mexico when they teamed up with Consejo Mundial de Lucha Libre (CMLL) to present CMLL vs. AEW & ROH and Grand Slam Mexico at Arena Mexico in Mexico City. On December 13, 2025, AEW held the first Winter is Coming event outside the United States when the promotion taped an episode of Collision at Utilita Arena Cardiff in Cardiff, Wales.

On October 9, 2026, AEW announced that the 2026 edition of Winter Is Coming would take place on December 9, 2026 at Arena Monterrey in Monterrey, Nuevo Leon, Mexico, marking the first time the event has taken place in Mexico.

=== Storylines ===
Winter Is Coming featured professional wrestling matches that involved different wrestlers from pre-existing scripted feuds and storylines. Storylines were produced on AEW's weekly television programs, Dynamite and Collision.

== Matches ==
No.	Matches*	Stipulations
1	FTR (Cash Wheeler and Dax Harwood) and The Kasper Brothers (Drew Kasper and Jacob Kasper) vs. The Young Bucks (Matt Jackson and Nick Jackson) and Motor City Machine Guns (Alex Shelley and Chris Sabin)	Eight-man tag team match
*Card subject to change
