= List of AEW Dynamite special episodes =

This is a list of AEW Dynamite special episodes, detailing all professional wrestling television special cards promoted on AEW Dynamite by All Elite Wrestling (AEW).

On May 8, 2019, AEW reached a new media rights deal with British media company ITV to broadcast their shows on ITV4 with repeats on ITV1. On May 15, 2019, AEW and Warner Bros. Discovery announced a deal for a weekly prime-time show airing live on TNT and would also stream live events and pay-per-views on Bleacher Report in the United States and Canada. On September 25, 2019, AEW announced an international streaming deal with FITE TV primarily for regions outside of the United States and Canada via the "AEW Plus" package, which includes live streaming and replay access of Dynamite in simulcast with its U.S. airing. In Canada, Bell Media's TSN acquired broadcast rights to Dynamite, marking the return of professional wrestling to the network after WWE Raw moved to rival network The Score (now Sportsnet 360) in 2006. The show is broadcast in simulcast with TNT in the U.S. (but is subject to scheduling) and is streamed on TSN Direct as well as TSN's website. In the U.S., Dynamite moved to TNT's sister channel TBS on January 5, 2022. It then began simulcasting on the streaming service Max on January 1, 2025.

== Special episodes ==
=== 2019 ===
Episode	Date	Venue	Location	Rating (18–49)	U.S. viewers (million)	Notes
Debut episode	October 2, 2019	Capital One Arena	Washington, D.C.	0.68	1.409	First professional wrestling program to air on TNT since the final episode of WCW Monday Nitro on March 26, 2001.: Special appearances by Kevin Smith and Jason Mewes; Debut of Jake Hager; Riho vs. Nyla Rose for the inaugural AEW Women's World Championship
Halloween episode	October 30, 2019	Charleston Coliseum	Charleston, West Virginia	0.33	0.759	Halloween and Rick and Morty themed episode.: Special appearance by The Rock 'n' Roll Express; SoCal Uncensored (Frankie Kazarian and Scorpio Sky) vs. Lucha Brothers (Pentagón Jr. and Rey Fénix) in the tournament final for the inaugural AEW World Tag Team Championship
Thanksgiving Eve Dynamite	November 27, 2019	Sears Centre Arena	Hoffman Estates, Illinois	0.26	0.663	Special Thanksgiving themed episode.: Featured Chris Jericho's "Thanksgiving Thank You Celebration For Le Champion".; Dynamite Diamond Final between Adam Page and MJF for the inaugural AEW Dynamite Diamond Ring; Special appearances by Soul Train Jones, Ted Irvine, and Diamond Dallas Page; Chris Jericho (c) vs. Scorpio Sky for the AEW World Championship

=== 2020 ===
Episode	Date	Venue	Location	Rating (18–49)	U.S. viewers (million)	Notes
Homecoming	January 1, 2020	Daily's Place	Jacksonville, Florida	0.36	0.967	New Year's Day special episode and inaugural Homecoming event.: Color commentary by Taz; Riho (c) vs. Britt Baker vs. Hikaru Shida vs. Nyla Rose for the AEW Women's World Championship
Anniversary Edition	January 8, 2020	Landers Center	Southaven, Mississippi	0.36	0.947	Celebrated the company's first anniversary of their inaugural press conference.: Paid tribute to the legends of Memphis wrestling: Jimmy Valiant, Brian Christopher, Dave Brown, Lance Russell, Austin Idol, Doug Gilbert, Tommy Gilbert, Eddie Gilbert, The Rock 'n' Roll Express, Lanny Poffo, Angelo Poffo, and Randy Savage.; Special appearances by Diamond Dallas Page and Zach Myers; Riho (c) vs. Kris Statlander for the AEW Women's World Championship
Bash at the Beach	January 15, 2020	Watsco Center	Coral Gables, Florida	0.38	0.940	The first part of a two-week special episode.: Aired in memory of Rocky Johnson.; Diamond Dallas Page's in-ring return
Bash at the Beach	January 22, 2020	Norwegian Pearl	Nassau, Bahamas	0.35	0.871	Taped on January 21, 2020, aboard the Norwegian Pearl as part of Chris Jericho's Rock 'N' Wrestling Rager at Sea.: SoCal Uncensored (Frankie Kazarian and Scorpio Sky) (c) vs. Kenny Omega and Adam Page for the AEW World Tag Team Championship
Fyter Fest	July 1, 2020	Daily's Place	Jacksonville, Florida	0.29	0.742	Second annual Fyter Fest event and the first part of a two-week special episode.: Hikaru Shida (c) vs. Penelope Ford for the AEW Women's World Championship; Cody (c) vs. Jake Hager for the AEW TNT Championship; Kenny Omega and Adam Page (c) vs. Best Friends (Chuck Taylor and Trent) for the AEW World Tag Team Championship; AEW began an experiment with sponsor executives and friends attending the event in order to test the possibility of ticketed spectators, as Daily's Place is an outdoor amphitheater. During the month, the International Motor Sports Association allowed 5,000 spectators to attend two WeatherTech SportsCar Championship events in Florida.
Fyter Fest	July 8, 2020	Daily's Place	Jacksonville, Florida	0.28	0.715	Taped on July 2, 2020.: Taz reintroduced the FTW Championship and awarded it to Brian Cage; Kenny Omega and Adam Page (c) vs. Private Party (Isiah Kassidy and Marq Quen) for the AEW World Tag Team Championship
Fight for the Fallen	July 15, 2020	Daily's Place	Jacksonville, Florida	0.29	0.788	Second annual Fight for the Fallen event.: Cody (c) vs. Sonny Kiss for the AEW TNT Championship; Jon Moxley (c) vs. Brian Cage for the AEW World Championship
Tag Team Appreciation Night	August 12, 2020	Daily's Place	Jacksonville, Florida	0.32	0.792	Tag team themed special episode hosted by FTR.: Special appearances by Arn Anderson and Tully Blanchard and The Rock 'n' Roll Express; Debut of Mike Chioda; Cody (c) vs. Scorpio Sky for the AEW TNT Championship; Kenny Omega and Adam Page (c) vs. Jurassic Express (Jungle Boy and Luchasaurus) for the AEW World Tag Team Championship
Saturday Night Dynamite	August 22, 2020	Daily's Place	Jacksonville, Florida	0.31	0.755	Taped on August 13, 2020. Saturday airing of Dynamite (due to 2020 NBA playoffs). First Saturday night professional wrestling show on a Turner network since the end of WCW Saturday Night on August 19, 2000.: Diamante and Ivelisse vs. The Nightmare Sisters (Allie and Brandi Rhodes) in the AEW Women's Tag Team Cup Tournament: The Deadly Draw tournament final; Cody (c) vs. Brodie Lee for the AEW TNT Championship
Thursday Night Dynamite	August 27, 2020	Daily's Place	Jacksonville, Florida	0.29	0.813	Thursday airing of Dynamite (due to 2020 NBA playoffs). First AEW live event with ticketed fans since March 11, 2020.: Color commentary by Chris Jericho
Late Night Dynamite	September 22, 2020	Daily's Place	Jacksonville, Florida	0.26	0.585	Taped on September 10, 2020. Tuesday airing of Dynamite. One-hour special episode.: Color commentary by Chris Jericho
Chris Jericho's 30th Anniversary Celebration	October 7, 2020	Daily's Place	Jacksonville, Florida	0.31	0.753	Celebrated the 30th anniversary of Chris Jericho's professional wrestling debut.: Special appearances by Slash, Dennis Miller, Hiroshi Tanahashi, Ted Irvine, Bully Ray, Shaquille O'Neal, Gene Simmons, Don Callis, Lars Ulrich, Diamond Dallas Page, Lance Storm, Kevin Smith, Eli Roth, Gabriel Iglesias, Chavo Guerrero Jr., Steel Panther, Ultimo Dragon, Paul Stanley, and Greg Valentine.; Brian Cage (c) vs. Will Hobbs for the FTW Championship; FTR (Cash Wheeler and Dax Harwood) (c) vs. The Hybrid 2 (Angélico and Jack Evans) for the AEW World Tag Team Championship; Brodie Lee (c) vs. Cody in a Dog Collar match for the AEW TNT Championship (This was Lee's final match; he died on December 26, 2020.)
Anniversary Show	October 14, 2020	Daily's Place	Jacksonville, Florida	0.30	0.826	Celebrated the first anniversary of Dynamite.: FTR (Cash Wheeler and Dax Harwood) (c) vs. Best Friends (Chuck Taylor and Trent) for the AEW World Tag Team Championship; Cody (c) vs. Orange Cassidy for the AEW TNT Championship; Hikaru Shida (c) vs. Big Swole for the AEW Women's World Championship; Jon Moxley (c) vs. Lance Archer in a No Disqualification match for the AEW World Championship
Thaksgiving Eve	November 25, 2020	Daily's Place	Jacksonville, Florida	0.26	0.712	Thanksgiving themed episode.: "Hangman" Adam Page vs. John Silver; Lee Johnson vs. Powerhouse Hobbs; The Hybrid2 (Jack Evans and Angélico) vs. Top Flight (Darius Martin and Dante Martin); SCU (Christopher Daniels and Frankie Kazarian) vs. Inner Circle (Chris Jericho and Jake Hager); Hikaru Shida (c) vs. Anna Jay for the AEW Women's World Championship; The Butcher and The Blade vs. Death Triangle (Pac and Rey Fénix)
Winter Is Coming	December 2, 2020	Daily's Place	Jacksonville, Florida	0.42	0.913	Inaugural Winter Is Coming event. Working relationship with Impact Wrestling established.: Debut of Sting; Dynamite Diamond Battle Royale to advance to the Dynamite Diamond Final for the AEW Dynamite Diamond Ring; Jon Moxley (c) vs. Kenny Omega for the AEW World Championship
Holiday Bash	December 23, 2020	Daily's Place	Jacksonville, Florida	0.32	0.775	Taped on December 17, 2020. Christmas special episode. Inaugural Holiday Bash event.: The Young Bucks (c) (Matt Jackson and Nick Jackson) vs. The Acclaimed (Anthony Bowens and Max Caster) for the AEW World Tag Team Championship
Brodie Lee Celebration of Life	December 30, 2020	Daily's Place	Jacksonville, Florida	0.40	0.977	In memory of Brodie Lee, who died on December 26, 2020. Featured segments with fellow performers paying tribute to Lee, and matches honoring Lee and his faction The Dark Order.: Color commentary by Chris Jericho; Special appearance by Erick Redbeard

=== 2021 ===
Episode	Date	Venue	Location	Rating (18–49)	U.S. viewers (million)	Notes
New Year's Smash	January 6, 2021 (Note: Night 1 was originally scheduled to air on December 30, 2020 with Night 2 on January 6, 2021, but the event was delayed for the Brodie Lee Celebration of Life.)	Daily's Place	Jacksonville, Florida	0.25	0.662	The first part of a two-week New Year's special episode. Inaugural New Year's Smash event.: Special appearance by Snoop Dogg; Debut of Impact Wrestling's The Good Brothers (Doc Gallows and Karl Anderson); Color commentary by Chris Jericho; Hikaru Shida (c) vs. Abadon for the AEW Women's World Championship; Kenny Omega (c) vs. Rey Fenix for the AEW World Championship
New Year's Smash	January 13, 2021	Daily's Place	Jacksonville, Florida	0.30	0.762	Taped on January 7, 2021.: Serena Deeb (c) vs. Tay Conti for the NWA World Women's Championship; Darby Allin (c) vs. Brian Cage for the AEW TNT Championship
Beach Break	February 3, 2021	Daily's Place	Jacksonville, Florida	0.32	0.844	Inaugural Beach Break event. Featured the wedding of Kip Sabian and Penelope Ford.: Debut of New Japan Pro-Wrestling's Kenta; Kenny Omega and The Good Brothers (Doc Gallows and Karl Anderson) vs. Jon Moxley and Death Triangle (Pac and Rey Fenix)
The Crossroads	March 3, 2021	Daily's Place	Jacksonville, Florida	0.33	0.934	Special appearances by Conrad Thompson, Eric Bischoff, Atsushi Onita, and J. J. Dillon.: Debut of Paul Wight; Shaquille O'Neal and Jade Cargill vs. Cody Rhodes and Red Velvet; Tully Blanchard in-ring return and return of Shawn Spears; Ryo Mizunami vs. Nyla Rose in the AEW Women's World Championship Eliminator Tournament Final
St. Patrick's Day Slam	March 17, 2021	Daily's Place	Jacksonville, Florida	0.28	0.768	Taped on March 11, 2021. Saint Patrick's Day special episode. Featured the first Dynamite women's main event match. Inaugural St. Patrick's Day Slam event.: Tully Blanchard and MJF introduced The Pinnacle; Dr. Britt Baker, D.M.D. vs. Thunder Rosa in an Unsanctioned Lights Out match
Blood & Guts	May 5, 2021	Daily's Place	Jacksonville, Florida	0.42	1.090	Featured the first-ever Blood and Guts match. It was the first time Dynamite ranked #1 on cable in the 18–49 key demographic. Inaugural Blood & Guts event.: The Pinnacle vs. The Inner Circle in a Blood and Guts match
Friday Night Dynamite	May 28, 2021	Daily's Place	Jacksonville, Florida	0.20	0.526	Friday airing of Dynamite (due to 2021 NBA playoffs). Go-home show for Double or Nothing.: Special appearance by Eric Bischoff; New AEW Women's World Championship belt awarded to Hikaru Shida; Miro (c) vs. Dante Martin for the AEW TNT Championship
Friday Night Dynamite	June 4, 2021	Daily's Place	Jacksonville, Florida	0.19	0.462	Friday airing of Dynamite (due to 2021 NBA playoffs).: Debut of Andrade El Idolo
Friday Night Dynamite	June 11, 2021	Daily's Place	Jacksonville, Florida	0.19	0.487	Taped on June 5, 2021. Friday airing of Dynamite (due to 2021 NBA playoffs).: Miro (c) vs. Evil Uno for the AEW TNT Championship
Friday Night Dynamite	June 18, 2021	Daily's Place	Jacksonville, Florida	0.20	0.552	Taped on June 6, 2021. Friday airing of Dynamite (due to TNT coverage of the 2021 NBA playoffs).: Debut of Brock Anderson; Jake Hager vs. Wardlow in a Mixed Martial Arts Rules Cage Fight
Saturday Night Dynamite	June 26, 2021	Daily's Place	Jacksonville, Florida	0.21	0.649	Saturday airing of Dynamite (due to 2021 NBA playoffs).: Special appearance by Konnan; Kenny Omega (c) vs. Jungle Boy for the AEW World Championship
Fan Appreciation Night	June 30, 2021	Daily's Place	Jacksonville, Florida	0.35	0.883	Dynamite's return to Wednesday nights; event was referred to as "Fan Appreciation Night" to in-venue attendees and "Wednesday Night Dynamite" to television viewers. Was the final event emanating from Jacksonville, Florida, during AEW's 14 month COVID-19 residency.: Color commentary by Chris Jericho; Vickie Guerrero's in-ring return; Miro (c) vs. Brian Pillman Jr. for the AEW TNT Championship; Special video package featuring "Celebrate" by Dirty Heads highlighting AEW's time throughout Daily's Place
Road Rager	July 7, 2021	James L. Knight Center	Miami, Florida	0.33	0.871	AEW's first live touring event since the onset of the COVID-19 pandemic, and the inaugural Road Rager event.: Special appearances by American Top Team's Dan Lambert, Jorge Masvidal and Amanda Nunes; Debut of Malakai Black; The Young Bucks vs. Penta El Zero Miedo and Eddie Kingston in a Street Fight for the AEW World Tag Team Championship
Fyter Fest	July 14, 2021	H-E-B Center at Cedar Park	Cedar Park, Texas	0.40	1.025	Third annual Fyter Fest event and the first part of a two-week special episode. Featured AEW's first-ever Coffin match.: Jon Moxley (c) vs. Karl Anderson for the IWGP United States Heavyweight Championship; Brian Cage (c) vs. Ricky Starks for the FTW Championship; Darby Allin vs. Ethan Page in a Coffin match
Fyter Fest	July 21, 2021	Curtis Culwell Center	Garland, Texas	0.44	1.148	Second part of the third annual Fyter Fest event. Special appearance by New Japan Pro-Wrestling's Hikuleo: Debut of Nick Gage and Chavo Guerrero Jr.; Britt Baker (c) vs. Nyla Rose for the AEW Women's World Championship; Jon Moxley (c) vs. Lance Archer in a Texas Death match for the IWGP United States Heavyweight Championship
Fight for the Fallen	July 28, 2021	Bojangles Coliseum	Charlotte, North Carolina	0.45	1.108	Third annual Fight for the Fallen event.: Special appearance by King Haku; Lance Archer (c) vs. Hikuleo for the IWGP United States Heavyweight Championship; "The Painmaker" Chris Jericho vs. Nick Gage in a No Rules match
Homecoming	August 4, 2021	Daily's Place	Jacksonville, Florida	0.46	1.102	Second annual Homecoming event.: Debut of Juventud Guerrera; Miro (c) vs. Lee Johnson for the AEW TNT Championship
Grand Slam	September 22, 2021	Arthur Ashe Stadium	Queens, New York	0.48	1.273	Took place at Arthur Ashe Stadium. It was Dynamite's first stadium show, AEW's New York City debut, and Part 1 of the inaugural Grand Slam event.: In-ring debut of Bryan Danielson; Dr. Britt Baker, D.M.D. (c) vs. Ruby Soho for the AEW Women's World Championship
Anniversary Show	October 6, 2021	Liacouras Center	Philadelphia, Pennsylvania	0.37	1.053	Celebrated the second anniversary of Dynamite.: Sammy Guevara (c) vs. Bobby Fish for the AEW TNT Championship; 2nd annual Casino Ladder match
Saturday Night Dynamite	October 16, 2021	James L. Knight Center	Miami, Florida	0.28	0.727	Saturday airing of Dynamite (due to TNT coverage of the 2021–22 NHL season).: Bryan Danielson vs. Bobby Fish
Saturday Night Dynamite	October 23, 2021	Addition Financial Arena	Orlando, Florida	0.22	0.575	Saturday airing of Dynamite (due to TNT coverage of the 2021–22 NHL season).: Cody Rhodes vs. Malakai Black
Thanksgiving Eve Dynamite	November 24, 2021	Wintrust Arena	Chicago, Illinois	0.31	0.898	Thanksgiving themed episode of Dynamite.: CM Punk vs. Q. T. Marshall; Bryan Danielson vs. Colt Cabana
MJF's Long Island Homecoming	December 8, 2021	UBS Arena	Elmont, New York	0.33	0.872	Toom place at the UBS Arena and was AEW's Long Island debut.: Featured MJF's "Long Island Homecoming".; Dynamite Diamond Battle Royale to advance to the Dynamite Diamond Final for the AEW Dynamite Diamond Ring; Bryan Danielson vs. John Silver
Winter Is Coming	December 15, 2021	Curtis Culwell Center	Garland, Texas	0.31	0.948	Second annual Winter Is Coming event.: "Hangman" Adam Page (c) vs. Bryan Danielson for the AEW World Championship
Holiday Bash	December 22, 2021	Greensboro Coliseum	Greensboro, North Carolina	0.37	1.020	Part 1 of the second annual Holiday Bash event. It was heavily advertised as Sting's return to Greensboro; the location of his first ever World Title match at 1988's Clash of the Champions Show featured Sting's and CM Punk's first main event match in AEW history.: Debut of Kyle O'Reilly; Ruby Soho vs. Nyla Rose (with Vickie Guerrero) in a AEW TBS Championship tournament semifinal.; Sting, CM Punk and Darby Allin vs. MJF and FTR
New Year's Smash	December 29, 2021	Daily's Place	Jacksonville, Florida	0.37	0.975	Part 1 of the second New Year's Smash event held as part of AEW's annual year-end party for talent and staff in Jacksonville. Final Dynamite on TNT before the move to TBS.

=== 2022 ===
Episode	Date	Venue	Location	Rating (18–49)	U.S. viewers (million)	Notes
Dynamite's TBS Premiere	January 5, 2022	Prudential Center	Newark, New Jersey	0.43	1.010	Debut episode of Dynamite on its new home network of TBS, and the first professional wrestling program to air on TBS since the final episode of WCW Thunder on March 21, 2001.: "Hangman" Adam Page (c) vs. Bryan Danielson for the AEW World Championship; Jade Cargill vs. Ruby Soho for the inaugural AEW TBS Championship; Jurassic Express (Jungle Boy and Luchasaurus) vs. The Lucha Brothers (Penta El Zero Miedo and Rey Fénix) for the AEW World Tag Team Championship
Beach Break	January 26, 2022	Wolstein Center	Cleveland, Ohio	0.41	1.100	Part 1 of the second annual Beach Break. Featured the debut of Danhausen in AEW, as well as the final AEW appearance for co-founder Cody Rhodes.: Cody Rhodes (c) vs. Sammy Guevara (c) in a Ladder Match to determine the undisputed TNT Champion; Adam Cole vs. Orange Cassidy in a Lights Out match
St. Patrick's Day Slam	March 16, 2022	Freeman Coliseum	San Antonio, Texas	0.38	0.993	Second annual St. Patrick's Day Slam. Featured the Hardy Boyz in their first ever AEW tag team match: Thunder Rosa vs Dr. Britt Baker D.M.D. (c) in a Steel Cage match for the AEW Women's World Championship; Scorpio Sky (c) vs Wardlow for the TNT Championship; Dr. Britt Baker D.M.D.'s women's championship reign ended at 290 days at this event.
Wild Card Wednesday	May 18, 2022	Fertitta Center	Houston, Texas	0.33	0.922	Featured the Quarterfinals and Semifinals of the Men's and Women's of the Owen Hart Cup Tournament.: Kyle O'Reilly vs. Rey Fenix in a Quarterfinals match in the Men's Owen Hart Cup; Samoa Joe vs. Johnny Elite in a Quarterfinals match in the Men's Owen Hart Cup; Dr. Britt Baker, D.M.D. vs. Maki Itoh in a Quarterfinals match in the Women's Owen Hart Cup; Adam Cole vs. Jeff Hardy in a Semifinals match in the Men's Owen Hart Cup
AEW's 3 Year Anniversary	May 25, 2022	Michelob Ultra Arena	Paradise, Nevada	0.35	0.929	Celebrated AEW's third anniversary: Wardlow vs. Shawn Spears in a Steel cage match with MJF as special guess referee; Dr. Britt Baker, D.M.D. vs. Toni Storm in a Semifinals match in the Women's Owen Hart Cup; Samoa Joe vs. Kyle O'Reilly in a Semifinals match in the Men's Owen Hart Cup; FTR vs. Roppongi Vice for the ROH World Tag Team Championship
Road Rager	June 15, 2022	Chaifetz Arena	St. Louis, Missouri	0.28	0.761	Part 1 of the second annual Road Rager event featuring: Chris Jericho vs. Ortiz in a Hair vs. Hair match; Wardlow vs. Plaintiffs in a 20-on-1 handicap elimination match; Ethan Page vs. Miro in a Quarterfinals match to determine the inaugural AEW All-Atlantic Champion at Forbidden Door; Dax Harwood vs. Will Ospreay; Dr. Britt Baker D.M.D vs. Toni Storm; Jurassic Express vs. The Young Bucks in a Ladder match for the AEW World Tag Team Championship
Blood & Guts	June 29, 2022	Little Caesars Arena	Detroit, Michigan	0.36	1.023	Second annual Blood & Guts featuring: Orange Cassidy vs. Ethan Page (with Dan Lambert); Luchasaurus (with Christian Cage) vs. Serpentico by pinfall; Max Caster and The Gunn Club (Austin Gunn and Colten Gunn) (with Anthony Bowens and Billy Gunn) vs. Danhausen and FTR (Dax Harwood and Cash Wheeler); Jade Cargill (c) (with Stokely Hathaway and Kiera Hogan) vs. Leila Grey; The Jericho Appreciation Society vs. Eddie Kingston, Santana and Ortiz and Blackpool Combat Club (Jon Moxley, Wheeler Yuta and Claudio Castagnoli) in a Blood and Guts match
Fyter Fest	July 13, 2022	Enmarket Arena	Savannah, Georgia	0.32	0.942	Fourth annual Fyter Fest event and the first part of a two-week special episode.: Wardlow vs. Orange Cassidy for the AEW TNT Championship; Jon Moxley vs. Konosuke Takeshita in a AEW Interim World Championship Eliminator Match; Luchasaurus vs. Griff Garrison; Claudio Castagnoli vs. Jake Hager; Serena Deeb vs. Anna Jay; Swerve In Our Glory (Keith Lee and Swerve Strickland) vs. The Young Bucks (Matt Jackson and Nick Jackson) vs. Team Taz (Powerhouse Hobbs and Ricky Starks) in a Three-way tag team match for the AEW World Tag Team Championship
Fyter Fest	July 20, 2022	Gas South Arena	Duluth, Georgia	0.32	0.910	Fourth annual Fyter Fest event and the second part of a two-week special episode.: Brody King vs. Darby Allin; Blackpool Combat Club (Jon Moxley and Wheeler Yuta) vs. Best Friends (Chuck Taylor and Trent Beretta); Christian Cage and Luchasaurus vs. The Varsity Blonds (Brian Pillman Jr. and Griff Garrison); Ricky Starks vs. Cole Karter for the FTW Championship; Jade Cargill and Kiera Hogan vs. Athena and Willow Nightingale; "The Painmaker" Chris Jericho vs. Eddie Kingston in a Barbed Wire Everywhere Deathmatch
Fight for the Fallen	July 27, 2022	DCU Center	Worcester, Massachusetts	0.33	0.976	Part 1 of the fourth annual Fight for the Fallen event.: Ricky Starks (c) vs. Danhausen for the FTW Championship; Jon Moxley (c) vs. Rush for the interim AEW World Championship; Thunder Rosa (c) vs. Miyu Yamashita for the AEW Women's World Championship; Bryan Danielson vs. Daniel Garcia; Swerve Strickland vs. Tony Nese & Mark Sterling in a 2-on-1 Handicap match; Sammy Guevara (with Tay Conti) vs. Dante Martin
Quake by the Lake	August 10, 2022	Target Center	Minneapolis Minnesota	0.33	0.972	Featuring: Jon Moxley vs. Chris Jericho for the interim AEW World Championship; Darby Allin vs. Brody King in a Coffin match; Jade Cargill (with Stokely Hathaway) vs. Madison Rayne for the AEW TBS Championship; Lucha Brothers (Penta Oscuro and Rey Fénix) (with Alex Abrahantes) vs. Andrade El Idolo and Rush (with Jose the Assistant) in a Tornado tag team match
House of the Dragon	August 17, 2022	Charleston Coliseum & Convention Center	Charleston, West Virginia	0.30	0.957	Special House of the Dragon themed episode: Bryan Danielson vs. Daniel Garcia in a Best Two Out Of Three Falls Match; Gunn Club (Austin Gunn and Colten Gunn) vs. The Varsity Blondes (Brian Pillman Jr. and Griff Garrison); Toni Storm vs. KiLynn King; The Elite (Kenny Omega, Matt Jackson, and Nick Jackson) vs. La Facción Ingobernable (Andrade El Idolo, Rush, and Dragon Lee) in a AEW World Trios Championship Tournament First Round Match
Grand Slam	September 21, 2022	Arthur Ashe Stadium	Queens, New York	0.35	1.039	Part 1 of the second annual Grand Slam event.: Jon Moxley vs. Bryan Danielson for the vacated AEW World Championship; Swerve In Our Glory (Swerve Strickland & Keith Lee) (c) vs. The Acclaimed (Max Caster & Anthony Bowens) for the AEW World Tag Team Championship; Pac (c) vs. Orange Cassidy for the AEW All-Atlantic Championship; Toni Storm (c) vs. Serena Deeb vs. Athena vs. Dr. Britt Baker, D.M.D. in a Four way match for the interim AEW Women's World Championship
Dynamite's 3 Year Anniversary	October 5, 2022	Entertainment and Sports Arena	Washington, D.C.	0.33	1.038	Celebrated Dynamite's third anniversary with a 15-minute overrun: MJF vs. Wheeler Yuta; Darby Allin vs. Jay Lethal; Daniel Garcia & Bryan Danielson vs. The Jericho Appreciation Society (Chris Jericho & Sammy Guevara); The Acclaimed's National Scissoring Day; Luchasaurus in action; Toni Storm, Athena, & Willow Nightingale vs. Jamie Hayter, Serena Deeb & Penelope Ford; Rush vs. "Hangman" Adam Page; Wardlow vs. Brian Cage for the AEW TNT Championship
Title Tuesday	October 18, 2022	Heritage Bank Center	Cincinnati, Ohio	0.26	0.752	Tuesday airing of Dynamite (due to TBS's coverage of the ALCS): Jon Moxley vs. "Hangman" Adam Page for the AEW World Championship; Toni Storm vs. Hikaru Shida for the interim AEW Women's World Championship; Chris Jericho vs. Dalton Castle for the ROH World Championship; Best Friends (Chuck Taylor, Trent Beretta, and Orange Cassidy) vs. Death Triangle ((Pac and The Lucha Brothers (Penta El Zero M and Rey Fénix)) for the AEW World Trios Championship; This episode went head-to-head with WWE NXT.
Thanksgiving Eve Dynamite	November 23, 2022	Wintrust Arena	Chicago, Illinois	0.32	0.880	Thanksgiving themed episode of Dynamite.: Orange Cassidy (c) vs. Jake Hager for the AEW All-Atlantic Championship; Ricky Starks vs. Ethan Page in the AEW World Championship Eliminator Tournament Finals; Death Triangle (Pac, Penta El Zero Miedo, and Rey Fénix) vs. The Elite (Kenny Omega and The Young Bucks (Matt Jackson and Nick Jackson)) in a match two of a Best of Seven Series for the AEW World Trios Championship; Dr. Britt Baker, D.M.D. and Jamie Hayter vs. Willow Nightingale and Skye Blue vs. TayJay A.S. (Tay Melo and Anna Jay A.S.) in a three-way tag team match; Chris Jericho (c) vs. Tomohiro Ishii for the ROH World Championship
Winter Is Coming	December 14, 2022	Curtis Culwell Center	Garland, Texas	0.33	0.950	Third annual Winter Is Coming event.: Death Triangle (Pac, Penta El Zero Miedo, and Rey Fénix) vs. The Elite (Kenny Omega and The Young Bucks (Matt Jackson and Nick Jackson)) in a match four of a Best of Seven Series for the AEW World Trios Championship; "Jungle Boy" Jack Perry vs. Brian Cage; House of Black (Malakai Black, Brody King, and Buddy Matthews) vs. The Factory (QT Marshall, Aaron Solo, and Cole Karter); Action Andretti vs. Chris Jericho; Ruby Soho vs. Tay Melo; MJF vs. Ricky Starks in a Winner Takes All match for both the AEW World Championship and AEW Dynamite Diamond Ring
Holiday Bash	December 21, 2022	Freeman Coliseum	San Antonio, Texas	0.30	0.957	Third annual Holiday Bash event.: Death Triangle (Pac, Penta El Zero Miedo, and Rey Fénix) vs. The Elite (Kenny Omega and The Young Bucks (Matt Jackson and Nick Jackson)) in a No Disqualification match five of a Best of Seven Series for the AEW World Trios Championship; Hook vs Exodus Prime; Jon Moxley vs. Darius Martin; The Gunns (Austin Gunn and Colten Gunn) vs. FTR (Cash Wheeler and Dax Harwood); Jamie Hayter vs. Hikaru Shida for the AEW Women's World Championship
New Year's Smash	December 28, 2022	1stBank Center	Broomfield, Colorado	0.28	0.876	Third annual New Year's Smash event.: Bryan Danielson vs. Ethan Page; Blackpool Combat Club (Jon Moxley and Claudio Castagnoli) vs. Top Flight (Dante Martin and Darius Martin); Hook vs. Baylum Lynx; Death Triangle (Pac, Penta El Zero Miedo, and Rey Fénix) vs. The Elite (Kenny Omega and The Young Bucks (Matt Jackson and Nick Jackson)) in a Falls Count Anywhere match six of a Best of Seven Series for the AEW World Trios Championship; TayJay A.S. (Tay Melo and Anna Jay A.S.) vs. Willow Nightingale and Ruby Soho; Samoa Joe vs. Wardlow for the AEW TNT Championship

=== 2023 ===
Episode	Date	Venue	Location	Rating (18–49)	U.S. viewers (million)	Notes
Championship Fight Night	February 8, 2023	El Paso County Coliseum	El Paso, Texas	0.30	0.899	Featured two championships matches and two Championship Eliminator matches.: MJF vs. Konosuke Takeshita in a Championship Eliminator match; Jamie Hayter vs. The Bunny in a Championship Eliminator match; Ricky Starks vs. Angelo Parker, Matt Menard, and Daniel Garcia in a Gauntlet match for a chance to Starks to have a match against Chris Jericho; Bryan Danielson vs. Rush; The Elite (Kenny Omega, Matt Jackson, and Nick Jackson) (c) vs. Top Flight (Dante Martin and Darius Martin) and A.R. Fox for the AEW World Trios Championship; The Acclaimed (Anthony Bowens and Max Caster) (c) vs. The Gunns (Austin Gunn and Colten Gunn) for the AEW World Tag Team Championship
Blood & Guts	July 19, 2023	TD Garden	Boston, Massachusetts	0.34	0.953	Third annual Blood & Guts, featuring a championship match, the finals of the Blind Eliminator Tag Team Tournament, and the Blood and Guts match: Hook (c) vs. Jack Perry for the FTW Championship; Dr. Britt Baker, D.M.D. vs. Kayla Sparks; Adam Cole and MJF vs. The Jericho Appreciation Society (Sammy Guevara and Daniel Garcia) in the finals of the Blind Eliminator Tag Team Tournament; The Golden Elite (Kenny Omega, "Hangman" Adam Page, Matt Jackson, Nick Jackson, and Kota Ibushi) vs. Blackpool Combat Club (Jon Moxley, Claudio Castagnoli, and Wheeler Yuta), Konosuke Takeshita, and Pac in a Blood and Guts match
Dynamite 200	August 2, 2023	Yuengling Center	Tampa, Florida	0.31	0.894	Celebrated the 200th episode of Dynamite: Chris Jericho and Konosuke Takeshita vs. The Jericho Appreciation Society (Sammy Guevara and Daniel Garcia); Trent Beretta vs. Jon Moxley vs. Penta El Zero Miedo in a three-way Anything Goes match; The Elite (Kenny Omega, Matt Jackson, and Nick Jackson) vs. Jay Lethal, Jeff Jarrett, and Satnam Singh; Aussie Open (Kyle Fletcher and Mark Davis) (c) vs. El Hijo del Vikingo and Komander for the ROH World Tag Team Championship; Toni Storm (c) vs. Hikaru Shida for the AEW Women's World Championship
Fight for the Fallen	August 16, 2023	Bridgestone Arena	Nashville, Tennessee	0.32	0.874	Part 1 of the fifth annual Fight for the Fallen event.: Orange Cassidy (c) vs. Wheeler Yuta for the AEW International Championship; Darby Allin and Nick Wayne vs. Gates of Agony (Kaun and Toa Liona); Jeff Jarrett vs. Jeff Hardy in The Texas Chain Saw Massacre Deathmatch; Dr. Britt Baker, D.M.D. vs. The Bunny in a qualifier match for the AEW Women's World Championship match at All In; The Young Bucks (Matt Jackson and Nick Jackson) vs. The Gunns (Austin Gunn and Colten Gunn)
Fyter Fest	August 23, 2023	Gas South Arena	Duluth, Georgia	0.32	0.870	Part 1 of the fifth annual Fyter Fest event.: Jon Moxley vs. Rey Fénix; Darby Allin and Nick Wayne vs. Mogul Embassy (AR Fox and Swerve Strickland) in a tornado tag team match; Ruby Soho vs. Skye Blue; Aussie Open (Mark Davis and Kyle Fletcher (c) vs. The Hardys (Jeff Hardy and Matt Hardy) for the ROH World Tag Team Championship
Grand Slam	September 20, 2023	Arthur Ashe Stadium	Queens, New York	0.36	0.984	Part 1 of the third annual Grand Slam event.: Claudio Castagnoli (ROH) vs. Eddie Kingston (Strong) in a Winner Takes All match for the ROH World Championship and Strong Openweight Championship; Chris Jericho vs. Sammy Guevara; Jon Moxley (c) vs. Rey Fénix for the AEW International Championship; Saraya (c) vs. Toni Storm for the AEW Women's World Championship; MJF (c) vs. Samoa Joe for the AEW World Championship
Dynamite's 4 Year Anniversary	October 4, 2023	Stockton Arena	Stockton, California	0.28	0.800	Celebrated Dynamite's fourth anniversary.: Rey Fénix (c) vs. Nick Jackson for the AEW International Championship; Griff Garrison vs. Wardlow; Billy Gunn and The Acclaimed (Anthony Bowens and Max Caster) (c) vs. The Butcher, The Blade, and Kip Sabian for the AEW World Trios Championship; Chris Jericho and Kenny Omega vs. Konosuke Takeshita and Kyle Fletcher; Toni Storm vs. Skye Blue
Title Tuesday	October 10, 2023	Cable Dahmer Arena	Independence, Missouri	0.26	0.609	Tuesday airing of Dynamite due to TBS's coverage of the NLDS, which featured the AEW in-ring debut of Adam Copeland (formerly known as Edge in WWE).: Eddie Kingston (c) vs. Minoru Suzuki for the NJPW Strong Openweight Championship and ROH World Championship (Buy-in); Bryan Danielson vs. Swerve Strickland for a future AEW TNT Championship match; Chris Jericho vs. Powerhouse Hobbs; Rey Fenix (c) vs. Orange Cassidy for the AEW International Championship; Wardlow vs. Matt Sydal; "Hangman" Adam Page vs. Jay White; Saraya (c) vs. Hikaru Shida for the AEW Women's World Championship; Adam Copeland vs. Luchasaurus; This episode went head-to-head with WWE NXT.
Thanksgiving Eve Dynamite	November 22, 2023	Wintrust Arena	Chicago, Illinois	0.26	0.845	Thanksgiving themed episode of Dynamite.: Jay Lethal vs. Swerve Strickland in a Gold League match of the Continental Classic tournament; Hook, Orange Cassidy, and Katsuyori Shibata vs. Jake Hager, Angelo Parker, and Matt Menard; Jay White vs. Rush in a Gold League match of the Continental Classic tournament; Anna Jay vs. Ruby Soho vs. Skye Blue; Jon Moxley vs. Mark Briscoe in a Gold League match of the Continental Classic tournament
Winter Is Coming	December 13, 2023	College Park Center	Arlington, Texas	0.30	0.845	Part 1 of the fourth annual Winter Is Coming event.: Jon Moxley vs. Swerve Strickland in a Gold League match of the Continental Classic tournament; Jay White vs. Mark Briscoe in a Gold League match of the Continental Classic tournament; Rush vs. Jay Lethal in a Gold League match of the Continental Classic tournament; "Hangman" Adam Page vs. Roderick Strong
Holiday Bash	December 20, 2023	Paycom Center	Oklahoma City, Oklahoma	0.26	0.782	Part 1 of the fourth annual Holiday Bash event.: Swerve Strickland vs. Rush in an AEW Continental Classic Gold League match; Mark Briscoe vs. Jay Lethal in an AEW Continental Classic Gold League match; Riho vs. Saraya to determine the #1 contender to the AEW Women's World Championship; Roderick Strong vs. Komander; Jay White vs. Jon Moxley in an AEW Continental Classic Gold League match
New Year's Smash	December 27, 2023	Addition Financial Arena	Orlando, Florida	0.31	0.843	Part 1 of the fourth New Year's Smash event.: Featured the League Finals of the Continental Classic tournament; MJF (c) vs. The Devil's Masked Men (Note: At the time of this match, the identities of both team members were unknown, but they were revealed as Matt Taven and Mike Bennett at Worlds End on December 30.) in a 2-on-1 Handicap match (Note: Samoa Joe was originally scheduled to team with MJF to defend the title in place of an injured Adam Cole, but Joe appeared to have been attacked by The Devil's Masked Men before the match, which was later revealed to have been a ruse as Joe attacked MJF after the match.) for the ROH World Tag Team Championship; Skye Blue vs. Kris Statlander; Eddie Kingston vs. Bryan Danielson in the Continental Classic Blue League Final; Jon Moxley vs. Swerve Strickland vs. Jay White in the Continental Classic Gold League Final

=== 2024 ===
Episode	Date	Venue	Location	Rating (18–49)	U.S. viewers (million)	Notes
Homecoming	January 10, 2024	Daily's Place	Jacksonville, Florida	0.29	0.797	Part 1 of the third Homecoming event.: "Hangman" Adam Page vs. Claudio Castagnoli; Adam Copeland, Dustin Rhodes, Orange Cassidy and Preston Vance vs. Lance Archer and The Mogul Embassy (Brian Cage, Bishop Kaun and Toa Liona); Kris Statlander, Willow Nightingale, Thunder Rosa and Anna Jay vs. Skye Blue, Julia Hart and The Outcasts (Saraya and Ruby Soho); Roderick Strong vs. Bryan Keith; Darby Allin and Sting vs. The Don Callis Family (Powerhouse Hobbs and Konosuke Takeshita) in a Texas Tornado tag team match
Big Business	March 13, 2024	TD Garden	Boston, Massachusetts	0.27	0.798	Featured the AEW debut of Mercedes Moné.: Samoa Joe (c) vs. Wardlow for the AEW World Championship; The Elite (The Young Bucks (Matthew Jackson and Nicholas Jackson) and Kazuchika Okada) vs. Eddie Kingston and Death Triangle (Pac and Penta El Zero Miedo); Darby Allin vs. Jay White; Chris Jericho and Hook vs. Gates of Agony (Bishop Kaun and Toa Liona); Willow Nightingale vs. Riho
Beach Break	July 3, 2024	Wintrust Arena	Chicago, Illinois	0.23	0.691	Part 1 of the third Beach Break event.: Bryan Danielson vs. Pac in a Men's Owen Hart Cup semifinal match; Willow Nightingale vs. Kris Statlander in a Women's Owen Hart Cup semifinal match; Hook, Katsuyori Shibata and Samoa Joe vs. Cage of Agony (Bishop Kaun, Brian Cage and Toa Liona); "Hangman" Adam Page vs. Jeff Jarrett in a Men's Owen Hart Cup quarterfinal match; Will Ospreay (c) vs. Daniel Garcia for the AEW International Championship
Dynamite 250	July 17, 2024	Simmons Bank Arena	North Little Rock, Arkansas	0.27	0.795	Celebrated the 250th episode of Dynamite: Will Ospreay (c) vs. MJF for the AEW International Championship; Mercedes Moné (c) vs. Nyla Rose for the AEW TBS Championship; Kazuchika Okada vs. Swerve Strickland
Blood & Guts	July 24, 2024	Bridgestone Arena	Nashville, Tennessee	0.26	0.786	Fourth annual Blood & Guts event.: Chris Jericho (c) vs. Minoru Suzuki for the FTW Championship; Dr. Britt Baker, D.M.D. vs. Hikaru Shida; Pac vs. Boulder; Mariah May vs. Kaitland Alexis; The Elite (Kazuchika Okada, Jack Perry, "Hangman" Adam Page and The Young Bucks (Matthew Jackson and Nicholas Jackson)) vs. Team AEW (Swerve Strickland, Mark Briscoe, Darby Allin and The Acclaimed (Max Caster and Anthony Bowens)) in a Blood and Guts match
Grand Slam	September 25, 2024	Arthur Ashe Stadium	Queens, New York	0.23	0.702	Part 1 of the fourth annual Grand Slam event.: Bryan Danielson vs. Nigel McGuiness; Hook vs. Roderick Strong for the FTW Championship; The Young Bucks (Matthew Jackson and Nicholas Jackson (c) vs. Kyle Fletcher and Will Ospreay for the AEW World Tag Team Championship; Mariah May vs. Yuka Sakazaki for the AEW Women's World Championship; Jon Moxley vs. Darby Allin for Allin's AEW World Championship opportunity
Dynamite's 5 Year Anniversary	October 2, 2024	Petersen Events Center	Pittsburgh, Pennsylvania	0.20	0.680	Two-and-a-half hour episode to commemorate Dynamite's fifth anniversary.: Will Ospreay (c) vs. Ricochet for the AEW International Championship; Dr. Britt Baker, D.M.D. vs. Serena Deeb; "Hangman" Adam Page vs. Juice Robinson; Private Party ("Brother Zay" Isiah Kassidy and Marq Quen) vs. Iron Savages (Boulder and Bronson); Bryan Danielson (c) vs. Kazuchika Okada for the AEW World Championship, with Okada's AEW Continental Championship also on the line for the first 20 minutes
Title Tuesday	October 8, 2024	Spokane Arena	Spokane, Washington	0.10	0.329	Tuesday airing of Dynamite due to TBS's coverage of the ALDS. This episode went head-to-head with WWE NXT.: Willow Nightingale vs. Saraya vs. Nyla Rose vs. Jamie Hayter to determine who will challenge for the AEW Women's World Championship at WrestleDream; Mercedes Moné (c) vs. Emi Sakura for the AEW TBS Championship and NJPW Strong Women's Championship; Bryan Danielson and Wheeler Yuta vs. Claudio Castagnoli and Pac
Fright Night Dynamite	October 30, 2024	Wolstein Center	Cleveland, Ohio	0.19	0.628	Halloween themed episode.: Kamille vs. Kris Statlander; Shelton Benjamin vs. Swerve Strickland; Adam Cole vs. Buddy Matthews; The Young Bucks (Matthew Jackson and Nicholas Jackson (c) vs. Private Party ("Brother Zay" Isiah Kassidy and Marq Quen) for the AEW World Tag Team Championship
Thanksgiving Eve Dynamite	November 27, 2024	Wintrust Arena	Chicago, Illinois	0.15	0.536	Thanksgiving themed episode.: Shelton Benjamin vs. Mark Briscoe in an AEW Continental Classic Blue League match; Chris Jericho (c) vs. Tomohiro Ishii for the ROH World Championship; Claudio Castagnoli vs. Ricochet in an AEW Continental Classic Gold League match; Jamie Hayter vs. Queen Aminata in an International Women's Cup Qualifier; Brody King vs. Darby Allin in an AEW Continental Classic Gold League match
Winter Is Coming	December 11, 2024	T-Mobile Center	Kansas City, Missouri	0.17	0.594	Part 1 of the fifth annual Winter Is Coming event.: Jay White and Orange Cassidy vs. Death Riders (Jon Moxley and Pac); Claudio Castagnoli vs. Will Ospreay in an AEW Continental Classic Gold League match; Kyle O'Reilly vs. Adam Cole in a Dynamite Diamond Semifinal to advance to the Final for the AEW Dynamite Diamond Ring; Brody King vs. Ricochet in an AEW Continental Classic Gold League match; Mariah May (c) vs. Mina Shirakawa for the AEW Women's World Championship
Holiday Bash	December 18, 2024	Entertainment & Sports Arena	Washington, D.C.	0.19	0.625	Part 1 of the fifth annual Holiday Bash event.: Mercedes Moné (c) vs. Anna Jay for the AEW TBS Championship; The Patriarchy (Christian Cage and Nick Wayne) vs. Hook and Katsuyori Shibata; Shelton Benjamin vs. The Beast Mortos in an AEW Continental Classic Blue League match; Darby Allin vs. Will Ospreay in an AEW Continental Classic Gold League match; Death Riders (Jon Moxley, Pac, and Wheeler Yuta) vs. "Hangman" Adam Page, Jay White, and Orange Cassidy
Dynamite on 34th Street	December 25, 2024	Hammerstein Ballroom	New York City, New York	0.18	0.574	Special episode of Dynamite, which was taped on December 22 as part of a three-day event at the Hammerstein Ballroom that included Final Battle on Friday, Collision on Saturday, and Dynamite/Rampage on Sunday.: Brody King vs. Will Ospreay in an AEW Continental Classic Gold League match; Darby Allin vs. Ricochet in an AEW Continental Classic Gold League match; Claudio Castagnoli vs. Komander in an AEW Continental Classic Gold League match; Shelton Benjamin vs. Kazuchika Okada in an AEW Continental Classic Blue League match; Toni Storm vs. Taya Valkyrie; Kyle Fletcher vs. Daniel Garcia in an AEW Continental Classic Blue League match

=== 2025 ===
Since the start of Dynamite simulcasting on HBO Max from the January 1, 2025, episode onward, official TV ratings for the show's simulcast on Max have been unavailable.

Episode	Date	Venue	Location	Rating (18–49)	U.S. viewers (million)	Notes
Fight for the Fallen	January 1, 2025	Harrah's Cherokee Center	Asheville, North Carolina	0.16	0.588	Sixth Fight for the Fallen event, which helped support victims of Hurricane Helene that greatly affected the Asheville area in September 2024.: "Hangman" Adam Page vs. Orange Cassidy; The Hurt Syndicate (Bobby Lashley and Shelton Benjamin) vs. The Acclaimed (Anthony Bowens and Max Caster); Julia Hart vs. Jamie Hayter; Jay White vs. Swerve Strickland vs. Roderick Strong for the #1 spot in the Casino Gauntlet match; Powerhouse Hobbs vs. Jon Cruz and Rob Killjoy; Death Riders (Jon Moxley, Claudio Castagnoli, and Wheeler Yuta) vs. Rated FTR (Cope, Cash Wheeler, and Dax Harwood)
Maximum Carnage	January 15, 2025	Andrew J. Brady Music Center	Cincinnati, Ohio	0.18	0.679	Part 1 of the Maximum Carnage event.: Kenny Omega vs. Brian Cage; Mark Briscoe and Private Party (Isiah Kassidy and Marq Quen) vs. The Hurt Syndicate (Bobby Lashley, Shelton Benjamin, and MVP); Christian Cage vs. Hook; Casino Gauntlet match for a AEW Women's World Championship match at Grand Slam Australia; Jon Moxley (c) vs. Powerhouse Hobbs for the AEW World Championship
Spring BreakThru	April 16, 2025	MGM Music Hall at Fenway	Boston, Massachusetts	0.17	0.624	Part 1 of the Spring BreakThru event. This episode marks Dynamite as becoming the longest running prime time weekly pro wrestling program in Turner Sports history.: Mercedes Moné vs. Athena in a Women's Owen Hart Cup Tournament Semifinal match; "Hangman" Adam Page vs. Josh Alexander in a Men's Owen Hart Cup Tournament Quarterfinal match; The Hurt Syndicate (Bobby Lashley and Shelton Benjamin) (c) vs. Gates of Agony (Toa Liona and Bishop Kaun) for the AEW World Tag Team Championship; Konosuke Takeshita vs. Will Ospreay in a Men's Owen Hart Cup Tournament Semifinal match; Death Riders (Claudio Castagnoli, Jon Moxley, and Wheeler Yuta) (c) vs. The Opps (Hook, Katsuyori Shibata, and Samoa Joe) for the AEW World Trios Championship
Beach Break	May 14, 2025	Now Arena	Hoffman Estates, Illinois	0.17	0.682	Part 1 of the fourth Beach Break event.: "Hangman" Adam Page and Will Ospreay vs. The Don Callis Family (Konosuke Takeshita and Josh Alexander); Ricochet vs. Zach Gowen; The Hurt Syndicate (Bobby Lashley and Shelton Benjamin) (c) vs. Top Flight (Dante Martin and Darius Martin) in an AEW World Tag Team Championship Eliminator match; "Timeless" Toni Storm (c) vs. Mina Shirakawa vs. Skye Blue vs. AZM in an AEW Women's World Championship Four-way Eliminator match; Jon Moxley (c) vs. Samoa Joe in a Steel Cage match for the AEW World Championship
Fyter Fest	June 4, 2025	Mission Ballroom	Denver, Colorado	0.18	0.655	Part 1 of the sixth Fyter Fest event.: Jon Moxley vs. Mark Briscoe; "Timeless" Toni Storm and Mina Shirakawa vs. Skye Blue and Julia Hart; Komander, Kevin Knight, and "Speedball" Mike Bailey vs. La Facción Ingobernable (Rush, The Beast Mortos, and Dralístico); Powerhouse Hobbs vs. Max Caster; Kenny Omega (c) vs. Brody King vs. Claudio Castagnoli vs. Máscara Dorada for the AEW International Championship
Summer Blockbuster	June 11, 2025	Theater of the Clouds at Moda Center	Portland, Oregon	0.17	0.597	Part 1 of the Summer Blockbuster event.: Will Ospreay vs. Swerve Strickland; Místico vs. Blake Christian; The Hurt Syndicate (Bobby Lashley, Shelton Benjamin, and MJF) vs. JetSpeed ("Speedball" Mike Bailey and Kevin Knight) and Máscara Dorada; TayJay (Tay Melo and Anna Jay) vs. Megan Bayne and Penelope Ford
Grand Slam Mexico	June 18, 2025	Arena México	Mexico City, Mexico	0.21	0.736	AEW's first event in Mexico.: MJF vs. Místico; Zeuxis (c) vs. Mercedes Moné for the CMLL World Women's Championship; Death Riders (Jon Moxley, Claudio Castagnoli, and Wheeler Yuta) and The Young Bucks (Matthew Jackson and Nicholas Jackson) vs. The Opps (Samoa Joe, Powerhouse Hobbs, and Katsuyori Shibata), Swerve Strickland, and Will Ospreay; Adam Cole, Atlantis Jr., Bandido, Brody King, Daniel Garcia, and Templario vs. Don Callis Family (Hechicero, Josh Alexander, Konosuke Takeshita, and Kyle Fletcher) and FTR (Cash Wheeler and Dax Harwood); Máscara Dorada vs. Ricochet vs. Hologram vs. Lio Rush; Kazuchika Okada vs. Mark Briscoe
Dynamite 300	July 2, 2025	Toyota Arena	Ontario, California	0.16	0.584	Celebrated the 300th episode of Dynamite. Superman themed episode.: Mercedes Moné (c) vs. Mina Shirakawa for the AEW TBS Championship; Anthony Bowens vs. AR Fox vs. Brody King vs. MJF for the #2 spot in the men's Casino Gauntlet match at All In; Bandido and Paragon (Kyle O'Reilly and Roderick Strong) vs. Konosuke Takeshita and The Young Bucks (Matthew Jackson and Nicholas Jackson); Swerve Strickland and Will Ospreay vs. La Faccion Ingobernable (Dralístico and The Beast Mortos); Kazuchika Okada vs. Kota Ibushi
September to Remember	September 17, 2025	Canada Life Place	London, Ontario, Canada	0.14	0.667	Part 1 of the September to Remember event.: Jon Moxley vs. Roderick Strong; Bobby Lashley vs. Toa Liona; The Young Bucks (Nick Jackson and Matt Jackson) vs. The Bang Bang Gang (Juice Robinson and Austin Gunn) in a Qualifying match for the AEW World Tag Team Championship ladder match at All Out; Máscara Dorada vs. The Beast Mortos in an AEW Unified Championship Eliminator match; Queen Aminata vs. Thekla in a No Holds Barred match
Dynamite's 6 Year Anniversary	October 1, 2025	Hard Rock Live	Hollywood, Florida	0.09	0.465	Episode to commemorate Dynamite's sixth anniversary.: Kenny Omega and Brodido (Brody King and Bandido) vs. Josh Alexander and The Young Bucks (Nick Jackson and Matt Jackson); Kyle Fletcher (c) vs. Orange Cassidy for the AEW TNT Championship; Death Riders (Jon Moxley, Claudio Castagnoli, and Daniel Garcia) vs. "Hangman" Adam Page and The Opps (Samoa Joe and Katsuyori Shibata); "Timeless" Toni Storm vs. Tay Melo; GOA (Bishop Kaun and Toa Liona) vs. Swirl (Blake Christian and Lee Johnson); Darby Allin and Kris Statlander vs. Death Riders (Wheeler Yuta and Marina Shafir) in a mixed tornado tag team match
Title Tuesday	October 7, 2025	Daily's Place	Jacksonville, Florida	0.07	0.321	Tuesday airing of Dynamite due to TBS's coverage of the NLDS. This episode was aired in competition with WWE's NXT vs. TNA Showdown.: Mercedes Moné (c) vs. Lacey Lane for the AEW TBS Championship; The Hurt Syndicate (Bobby Lashley, Shelton Benjamin, and MVP) vs. The Demand (Ricochet, Bishop Kaun, and Toa Liona) in a Street Fight
Fright Night Dynamite	October 28, 2025	Bert Ogden Arena	Edinburg, Texas	0.08	0.459	Second annual Fright Night Dynamite: Samoa Joe vs. Bobby Lashley vs. Ricochet vs. Hook in a four-way match to determine the #1 contender to the AEW World Championship
Blood & Guts	November 12, 2025	First Horizon Coliseum	Greensboro, North Carolina	0.15	0.600	Fifth annual Blood & Guts event.: Jamie Hayter, Willow Nightingale, Harley Cameron, "Timeless" Toni Storm, Mina Shirakawa, and Kris Statlander vs. Triangle of Madness (Julia Hart, Skye Blue, and Thekla), Megan Bayne, Marina Shafir, and Mercedes Moné in the Women's Blood and Guts match; "Hangman" Adam Page vs. Powerhouse Hobbs in a Falls Count Anywhere match; Darby Allin, Roderick Strong, and The Conglomeration (Mark Briscoe, Orange Cassidy, and Kyle O'Reilly) vs. Death Riders (Jon Moxley, Claudio Castagnoli, Wheeler Yuta, Daniel Garcia, and Pac) in the Men's Blood and Guts match
Thanksgiving Eve Dynamite	November 26, 2025	The Pinnacle	Nashville, Tennessee	0.10	0.512	Thanksgiving themed episode.: Kyle Fletcher vs. Kazuchika Okada in a Continental Classic Gold League match; Babes of Wrath (Harley Cameron and Willow Nightingale) vs. Sisters of Sin (Julia Hart and Skye Blue in an AEW Women's World Tag Team Championship semifinals match; Jon Moxley vs. Máscara Dorada in a Continental Classic Blue League match; Kevin Knight vs. Darby Allin in a Continental Classic Gold League match; Claudio Castagnoli vs. Orange Cassidy in a Continental Classic Blue League match
Winter Is Coming	December 10, 2025	Gateway Center Arena	College Park, Georgia	0.09	0.516	Part 1 of the fifth annual Winter Is Coming event.: Timeless Love Bombs ("Timeless" Toni Storm and Mina Shirakawa) vs. Babes of Wrath (Harley Cameron and Willow Nightingale) to crown the inaugural AEW Women's World Tag Team Champions; Kazuchika Okada vs. "Jungle" Jack Perry in a Continental Classic Gold League match; Swerve Strickland and "Hangman" Adam Page vs. The Opps (Katsuyori Shibata and Powerhouse Hobbs) in a tornado tag team match; "Speedball" Mike Bailey vs. Kyle Fletcher in a Continental Classic Gold League match; Samoa Joe (c) vs. Eddie Kingston for the AEW World Championship
Holiday Bash	December 17, 2025	Co-op Live	Manchester, England	0.08	0.511	Part 1 of the sixth annual Holiday Bash event.: Jon Moxley vs. Roderick Strong in a Continental Classic Blue League match; The Elite (Kenny Omega, Nick Jackson and Matt Jackson) vs. The Don Callis Family (Kazuchika Okada, Konosuke Takeshita, and Hechicero) in a $1,000,000 trios match; Mercedes Moné, Athena and The MegaProblems (Megan Bayne and Marina Shafir) vs. Babes of Wrath (Harley Cameron and Willow Nightingale) and Timeless Love Bombs ("Timeless" Toni Storm and Mina Shirakawa); Pac vs. Kyle Fletcher in a Continental Classic Gold League match; Dynamite Diamond Battle Royale to advance to the Dynamite Diamond Final for the AEW Dynamite Diamond Ring
Dynamite on 34th Street	December 24, 2025	Hammerstein Ballroom	New York City, New York			Second annual Dynamite on 34th Street event, which was taped on December 20.: Konosuke Takeshita vs. Orange Cassidy in a Continental Classic Blue League match; Roderick Strong vs. Máscara Dorada in a Continental Classic Blue League match; MJF vs. Dustin Waller; Bandido vs. Ricochet in the Dynamite Diamond Final for the AEW Dynamite Diamond Ring; Marina Shafir vs. Mina Shirakawa; Pac vs. "Jungle" Jack Perry in a Continental Classic Gold League match
New Year's Smash	December 31, 2025	Liberty First Credit Union Arena	Omaha, Nebraska	0.07	0.398	Sixth annual New Year's Smash: Mercedes Moné (c) vs. Willow Nightingale for the AEW TBS Championship

=== 2026 ===
Episode	Date	Venue	Location	Rating (18–49)	U.S. viewers (million)	Notes
Maximum Carnage	January 14, 2026	Arizona Financial Theatre	Phoenix, Arizona	0.08	0.526	Part 1 of the second annual Maximum Carnage event.: Darby Allin vs. Pac; "Hangman" Adam Page vs. Bryan Keith; Jon Cruz vs. Brody King; The Young Bucks (Matt Jackson and Nick Jackson) vs. GOA (Bishop Kaun and Toa Liona) vs. JetSpeed (Kevin Knight and "Speedball" Mike Bailey) vs. Davis and Doyle (Mark Davis and Jake Doyle) to determine the #1 contenders to the AEW World Tag Team Championship; Kris Statlander and Babes of Wrath (Willow Nightingale and Harley Cameron) vs. Triangle of Madness (Julia Hart, Skye Blue, and Thekla); MJF (c) vs. Bandido for the AEW World Championship
Spring BreakThru	April 15, 2026	Angel of the Winds Arena	Everett, Washington	0.12	0.710	Part 1 of the second annual Spring BreakThru event: Tommaso Ciampa vs. Dezmond Xavier; Kevin Knight (c) vs. Claudio Castagnoli for the AEW TNT Championship; Will Ospreay vs. Hechicero; Willow Nightingale (c) vs. Kamille for the AEW TBS Championship; MJF (c) vs. Darby Allin for the AEW World Championship
Summer Blockbuster	June 10, 2026	Andrew J. Brady Music Center	Cincinnati, Ohio	0.08	0.542	Part 1 of the second annual Summer Blockbuster event.: Jon Moxley (c) vs. Shane Taylor for the AEW Continental Championship; Mark Briscoe vs. Pac; Orange Cassidy vs. Andrade El Ídolo; Skye Blue vs. Maya World in a Women's Owen Hart Cup semifinal match; Swerve Strickland vs. Brody King in a Men's Owen Hart Cup semifinal match
Beach Break	July 8, 2026	The BayCare Sound at Coachman Park	Clearwater Beach, Florida	0.12	0.773	Fifth annual Beach Break event.: Jericho vs. Tommaso Ciampa; Konosuke Takeshita (c) vs. Kyle Fletcher for the AEW International Championship; Death Riders (Jon Moxley and Will Ospreay) vs. The WorkHorsemen (Anthony Henry and JD Drake); Women's Casino Gauntlet match for an AEW Women's World Championship match at Redemption; MJF (c) vs. Kenny Omega in a Last Chance match for the AEW World Championship
Grand Slam Mexico	August 5, 2026	Arena México	Mexico City, Mexico	0.14	0.694	Eighth Grand Slam event.: Death Riders (Jon Moxley, Wheeler Yuta, Pac, and Daniel Garcia) vs. Cage and Cope (Christian Cage and Adam Copeland) and The Young Bucks) (Matt Jackson and Nick Jackson); Andrade El Ídolo vs. Tommaso Ciampa vs. Komander to determine the #1 spot in the Casino Gauntlet match at All In; Willow Nightingale and The Brawling Birds (Jamie Hayter and Alex Windsor) vs. Mercedes Moné and Divine Dominion (Megan Bayne and Lena Kross); Kyle Fletcher (c) vs. "Speedball" Mike Bailey for the AEW International Championship; Místico, Jericho, and Darby Allin vs. The Don Callis Family (Kazuchika Okada, Kevin Knight, and Hechicero); Kris Statlander vs. Persephone; The Demand (Ricochet, Bishop Kaun and Toa Liona) (c) vs. "Hangman" Adam Page and Brodido (Brody King and Bandido) for the AEW World Trios Championship; Will Ospreay vs. Mark Davis in a Mexico City Street Fight
Rebel Heart	September 9, 2026	Akins Ford Arena	Athens, Georgia	0.10	0.571	Special episode dedicated dedicated to Rebel, following her having been diagnosed with ALS.: Swerve Strickland and The New Level (Kofi and Austin Creed) (c) (with Prince Nana) vs. The Conglomeration (Orange Cassidy, Roderick Strong, and Kyle O'Reilly) for the AEW World Trios Championship; Dr. Britt Baker, D.M.D., Persephone, and Hikaru Shida defeated Maya World, Thunder Rosa, Hyan; Andrade El Ídolo (c) vs. The Beast Mortos for the AEW National Championship; Will Ospreay (c) vs. David Finlay in an AEW World Championship eliminator match; Darby Allin and Steven Borden vs. The Don Callis Family (Mark Davis and Josh Alexander); The Don Callis Family (Kyle Fletcher and Kevin Knight) vs. The Young Bucks (Matt Jackson and Nick Jackson) in a tag team tables match
A Tribute to Pac	September 30, 2026	Petersen Events Center	Pittsburgh, Pennsylvania	0.22	0.899	Special memorial event dedicated to Pac, who died three days prior.
Grand Slam France	October 6, 2026	Adidas Arena	Paris, France	0.10	0.495	First AEW event in France. Part 1 of the ninth Grand Slam event.: Bandido (c) vs. Kofi for the ROH World Championship; "Jungle" Jack Perry vs. Samoa Joe with the winner qualifying for the Clockwork Carnage match at WrestleDream.; Death Riders (Jon Moxley and Gabe Kidd) vs. Davis and Doyle (Mark Davis and Jake Doyle; Darby Allin (c) vs. Kyle Fletcher for the AEW TNT Championship; Mercedes Moné (c) vs. Queen Aminata for the AEW Women's World Championship; Will Ospreay (c) vs. Kazuchika Okada for the AEW World Championship
Fright Night Dynamite	October 28, 2026	Chaifetz Arena	St. Louis, Missouri			Third annual Fright Night Dynamite.: The Cut (Jay White and David Finlay) vs. Death Riders (Jon Moxley and Daniel Garcia); Kyle Fletcher (with Don Callis) vs. "Jungle" Jack Perry; Motor City Machine Guns (Chris Sabin and Alex Shelley) vs. FTR (Dax Harwood and Cash Wheeler) in Match 3 of a best-of-five series; Marina Shafir vs. Rachel Armstrong; Darby Allin (c) vs. Josh Alexander for the AEW TNT Championship; Persephone (c) vs. Queen Aminata for the AEW TBS Championship
Blood & Guts	November 4, 2026	VyStar Veterans Memorial Arena	Jacksonville, Florida			Sixth annual Blood & Guts event.: Will Ospreay, Adam Copeland, Darby Allin, Steven Borden, and The Young Bucks (Matt Jackson and Nick Jackson) vs. The Don Callis Family (Kazuchika Okada, Kyle Fletcher, Wardlow, Kevin Knight, Mark Davis and Jake Doyle) in the Men's Blood and Guts match
Thanksgiving Eve	November 25, 2026	Liberty First Credit Union Arena	Omaha, Nebraska			
Winter Is Coming	December 9, 2026	Arena Monterrey	Monterrey, Nuevo Leon, Mexico			
Holiday Bash	December 23, 2026	Wintrust Arena	Chicago, Illinois			

=== 2027 ===
Episode	Date	Venue	Location	Rating (18–49)	U.S. viewers (million)	Notes
New Year's Smash	January 1, 2027	Gateway Center Arena	Atlanta, Georgia			Part 1 of the seventh annual New Year's Smash event.
Maximum Carnage	January 20, 2027	UNO Lakefront Arena	New Orleans, Louisiana			Third annual Maximum Carnage event

== See also ==
- List of All Elite Wrestling special events
- List of All Elite Wrestling pay-per-view events
- Wednesday Night Wars
