= Maya World =

American professional wrestler (born 2002)

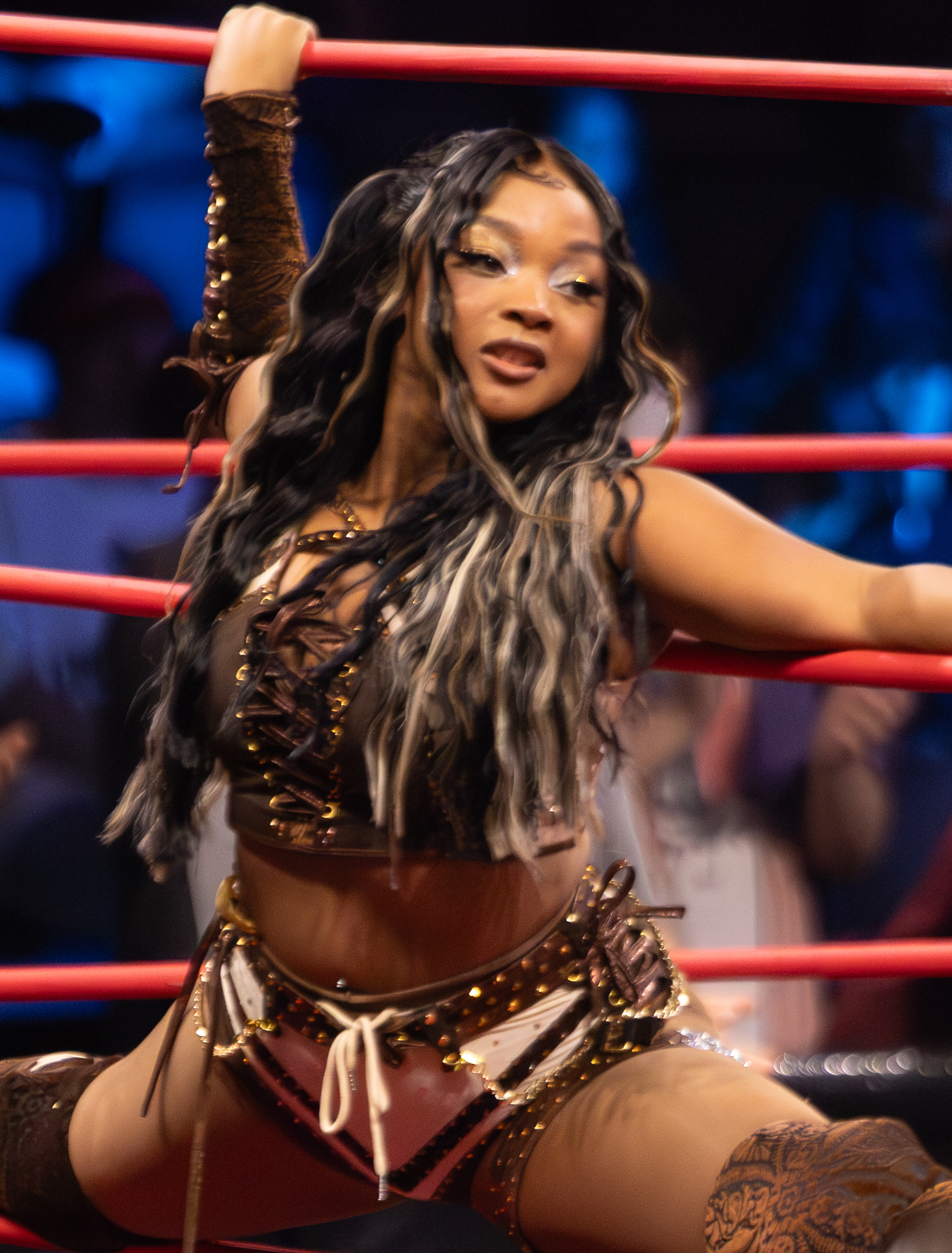
- World in 2026

Personal information
- Born: Ashanti Wilson-Stevenson; July 26, 2002 (age 24) Greenville, Texas, U.S.

Professional wrestling career
- Ring name: Maya World
- Billed from: Dallas, Texas
- Trained by: Athena; DFW All-Pro Wrestling Academy; Lou Gotti
- Debut: August 12, 2022

Ashanti Wilson-Stevenson (born July 26, 2002), better known by her ring name Maya World, is an American professional wrestler. As of December 2025, she is signed to All Elite Wrestling (AEW), where she is a former one-time AEW TBS Champion. She also performs in AEW's sister promotion Ring of Honor (ROH) and on the independent circuit, where she is the current VIP Women's Champion in her second reign.

== Professional wrestling career ==
=== Independent circuit (2022–present) ===
In October 2021, Stevenson started training at DFW All-Pro Wrestling Academy, where she was trained by Lou Gotti and Athena. She made her debut on August 12, 2022 under the name Maya World.

On March 31, 2023, World won her first championship at the promotion against Holidead. On September 30, World beat Killa Kate to win the Tomahawk Pro Women's Title

On January 7, 2024, World won the Inspire Pro Pure Prestige Championship in a 6-way match. The next month she won the MPW Tag Team Championships alongside Kiah Dream. At this point, she was holding 4 championships simultaneously. On April 20, World and Dream lost the tag team championships in a title for title match for the NWA World Women's Tag Team Championship. On July 7, World lost the Lawless Darkness Championship. The next month, World teamed with Jada Stone naming themselves 'Spark the World' where they won the Reality of Wrestling (ROW) Women's Tag Team Championship. The month after that World defeated Danny Orion to win the Inspire Pro Pure Prestige Championship. 2 weeks later World won the HOT Women's Championship defeating Sheeva.

On May 2, 2025, World beat Mercedes Martinez to win the VIP Women's Championship. On September 7 World lost the Inspire Pro Pure Prestige Championship to Oli Summers. The following month she the lost VIP Women's Championship to Vert Vixen, a title that she reclaimed 2 weeks later defeating Vixen and Nyla Rose.

=== All Elite Wrestling / Ring of Honor (2023–present) ===
On December 16, 2023, World made her Ring of Honor (ROH) debut, facing her mentor Athena in a ROH Women's World Title Proving Ground match World made her debut for ROH's sister promotion All Elite Wrestling (AEW) on the July 27 episode of Collision where she lost to Thunder Rosa. She would coninue to make sporadic appearances in AEW and ROH.

On the November 8, 2025 episode of Collision, World teamed with Hyan in a losing effort against TayJay (Anna Jay and Tay Melo). It was later reported that World and Hyan replaced Nixon Newell and Miranda Alize after the latter pair declined to face TayJay due to dissatisfaction with the booking and left the venue before the show began. The duo's performance was praised by AEW talent and management for their professionalism and willingness to step in on short notice. After a few more AEW appearances, World and Hyan officially signed contracts with AEW on December 27, 2025.

On April 12, 2026 on the Zero Hour pre-show of Dynasty, World and Hyan unsuccessfully challenged Divine Dominion (Lena Kross and Megan Bayne) for the AEW Women's World Tag Team Championship. In June, World replaced an injured Sareee in the Owen Hart Cup tournament, defeating Skye Blue in the quarterfinal on June 10 at Dynamite: Summer Blockbuster and Athena in the semifinal on the June 20 episode of Collision, before losing to Mercedes Moné in the grand final at Forbidden Door on June 28. On July 26 at Redemption, World defeated Hikaru Shida to win the AEW TBS Championship, marking her first championship in a major promotion. She lost the title to Persephone a month later on August 30 at the All In: London Buy-In after interference from Britt Baker, ending her reign at 35 days.

== Personal life ==
Stevenson's brother, Jatwane, was killed on June 7, 2026, after being struck by a passing vehicle in Kaufman County, Texas. She has cited her brother as her main inspiration to get into professional wrestling, along with her mentor Athena, and Mercedes Moné.

== Championships and accomplishments ==
In All Elite Wrestling, World is a former AEW TBS Champion.

- All Elite Wrestling
  - AEW TBS Championship (1 time)
- DFW All Pro Wrestling
  - DFW All-Pro Tag Team Championship (1 time) – with Alejandra Quitanilla
  - DFW All-Pro Women's Championship (1 time)
- HOT Pro Wrestling
  - HOT Women's Championship (1 time)
- Inspire Pro Wrestling
  - Inspire Pro Pure Prestige Championship (1 time)
  - Lawless Darkness Championship (1 time)
- Mission Pro Wrestling
  - MPW Tag Team Championship (1 time) – with Kiah Dream
- Reality of Wrestling
  - ROW Women's Tag Team Championship (1 time) – with Jada Stone
- Tomahawk Professional Wrestling
  - Tomahawk Pro Women's Championship (1 time)
- VIP Wrestling
  - VIP Women's Championship (2 times, current)
