= St. Patrick's Day Slam (2022) =

All Elite Wrestling television special

- Promotional poster
- Promotion: All Elite Wrestling
- Date: March 16, 2022
- City: San Antonio, Texas
- Venue: Freeman Coliseum
- Attendance: 6,775

St. Patrick's Day Slam chronology
← Previous; 2021	Next → 2023

AEW Dynamite special episodes chronology
← Previous; Beach Break	Next → Dynamite 3 Year Anniversary

The 2022 St. Patrick's Day Slam was the second annual St. Patrick's Day Slam professional wrestling television special produced by All Elite Wrestling (AEW). The event took place on March 16, 2022, at the Freeman Coliseum in San Antonio, Texas. It was broadcast on TBS as a special episode of AEW's weekly television program, Wednesday Night Dynamite.

== Production ==
Other on-screen personnel
Role	Name
Commentators	Excalibur
Commentators	Tony Schiavone
Commentators	Jim Ross
Ring announcer	Justin Roberts
Referees	Bryce Remsburg
Referees	Paul Turner
Referees	Aubrey Edwards
Referees	Rick Knox
Referees	Stephon Smith
Interviewers	Tony Schiavone
Interviewers	Alex Marvez

=== Storylines ===
St. Patrick's Day Slam featured professional wrestling matches that involved different wrestlers from pre-existing scripted feuds and storylines. Wrestlers portrayed heroes, villains, or less distinguishable characters in scripted events that built tension and culminated in a wrestling match or series of matches. Storylines were produced on AEW's weekly television program, Dynamite, the supplementary online streaming shows, Dark and Elevation, and The Young Bucks' YouTube series Being The Elite.

=== Background ===
For the second year in a row Thunder Rosa and Dr. Britt Baker, D.M.D. main evented St. Patrick's Day Slam, they faced off in a Steel Cage match where Rosa defeated Baker to become the new AEW Women's World Champion.

Adam Cole and reDRagon teamed up against the team of 'Hangman' Adam Page and Jurassic Express (Jungle Boy and Luchasaurus) in a trios match.

Scorpio Sky defended his TNT Championship against Wardlow and The Hardys (Matt and Jeff) made their AEW debut as a tag team facing off against Private Party (Isiah Kassidy and Marq Quen).

== Results ==
No.	Results	Stipulations	Times
1	Adam Cole and reDRagon (Bobby Fish and Kyle O'Reilly) defeated "Hangman" Adam Page and Jurassic Express (Jungle Boy and Luchasaurus)	Six-man tag team match	13:58
2	Bryan Danielson and Jon Moxley (with William Regal) defeated Best Friends (Chuck Taylor and Wheeler Yuta) (with Best Friends (Danhausen, Orange Cassidy and Trent Beretta))	Tag team match	11:45
3	Scorpio Sky (c) (with American Top Team (Austin Vanderford, Dan Lambert and Paige VanZant)) defeated Wardlow	Singles match for the AEW TNT Championship	9:20
4	The Hardys (Matt Hardy and Jeff Hardy) defeated Private Party (Isiah Kassidy and Marq Quen)	Tag team match	12:22
5	Thunder Rosa defeated Dr. Britt Baker, D.M.D (c)	Steel Cage match for the AEW Women's World Championship	17:33
(c) / – the champion(s) heading into the match

== See also ==
- 2022 in professional wrestling
