= Iron Savages =

Professional wrestling tag team

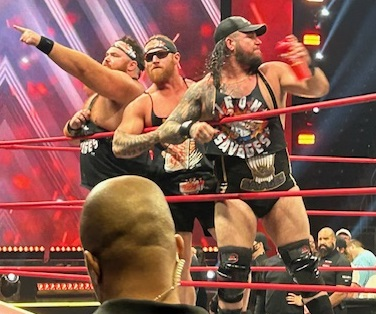
- The Iron Savages in November 2023, Boulder (left), Jameson (middle) and Bronson (right)

Tag team
- Name(s): Bear Country; Iron Savages
- Billed heights: Bronson: 6 ft 2 in (1.88 m)
- Combined billed weight: 599 lb (272 kg)
- Billed from: Upstate New York
- Former members: Beefcake Boulder; Bulk Bronson; Jacked Jameson; JT Davidson (manager)
- Debut: November 18, 2017
- Disbanded: December 21, 2024
- Years active: 2017–2024

The Iron Savages were a professional wrestling stable in All Elite Wrestling (AEW) and Ring of Honor (ROH). The stable initially consisted of Bear Bronson and Bear Boulder, with the later additions of managers JT Davidson and Jacked Jameson, with the latter serving as their manager and whom wrestled as their partner for trios matches on occasion.

== History ==
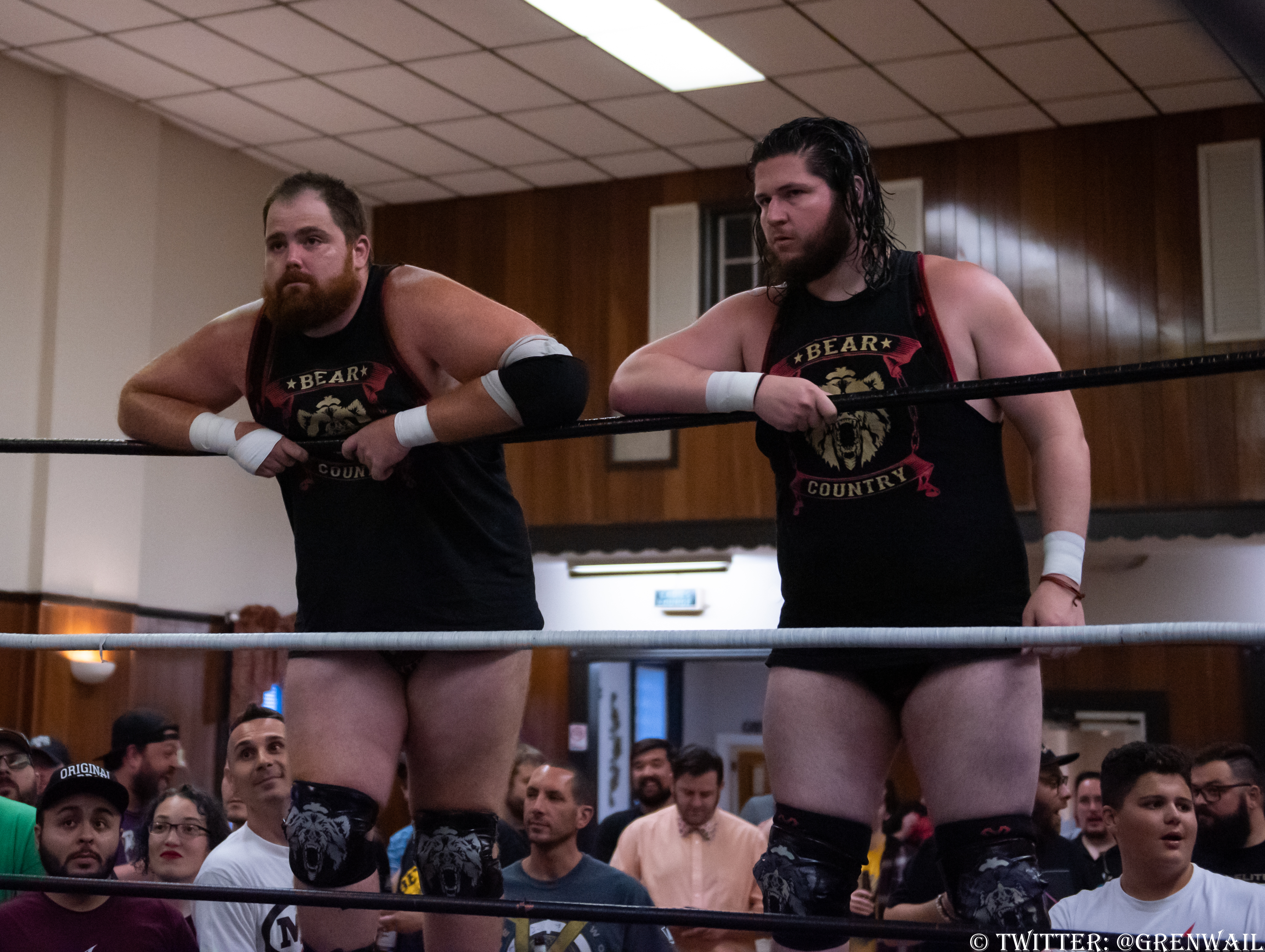
Bear Country in July 2019

=== Early careers (2017–2019) ===
Bear Bronson hails from Upstate New York while Boulder is from New Jersey. The team's identity and original name, Bear Country, have been closely linked to the wilderness surrounding Bronson's place of origin. The two wrestlers first teamed in 2017, making one-off appearances in both Combat Zone Wrestling and Limitless Wrestling. The team then became regular members of Chaotic Wrestling in 2018 and won the Chaotic Wrestling Tag Team Championship later that year. The team joined Beyond Wrestling in 2019 and began to garner greater attention from fans. Notable matches included victories over Santana and Ortiz, the Butcher and the Blade, and the Beaver Boys. In 2019 Bear Country began to travel the United States to appear in various indie promotions. After a stop in Black Label Pro, the team became tag team champions in Xtreme Wrestling Alliance. Finally, the duo returned to CZW for a full-time stint.

=== All Elite Wrestling / Ring of Honor (2020–2025) ===
Bear Country debuted in All Elite Wrestling on an episode of AEW Dark in December 2020 losing to The Dark Order. The following week Bronson and Boulder appeared on Dark again, this time facing the Jurassic Express in a losing effort. In May 2021 the team was officially signed to the AEW roster. On August 22, 2022 AEW filed a trademark for a new name. The team returned the following day, again on AEW Dark, and defeated them team of Vary Morales and Levis Valenzuela. They also introduced their new manager, JT Davidson. Davidson would depart the group in April 2023, which Boulder said in an interview in 2024, was due to ongoing health issues. In May 2023 the Iron Savages debuted in AEW's partner promotion Ring of Honor against Peter Avalon and Ryan Nemeth of The Wingmen, the Iron Savages were escorted to the ring by new member Jacked Jameson in a winning effort. The following month the trio challenged the Mogul Embassy for the ROH World Six-Man Tag Team Championship but was unsuccessful. The Iron Savages made their debut on Collision on August 12, 2023 losing to The Acclaimed. The team appeared on Collision again the week after, in a trios match against Juice Robinson and The Gunns in a losing effort.

On February 7, 2025, it was reported that Boulder's contract had been terminated due to him being arrested and charged with a felony for domestic battery by strangulation.

Following Boulder's release, Jameson and Bronson would go their separate ways as Bronson would also leave AEW a few months after Boulder, while Jameson would form The Frat House alongside Cole Karter, Griff Garrison, and Preston Vance.

== Championships and accomplishments ==
- Chaotic Wrestling
  - Tag Team Championship (1 time)
- Extreme Wrestling Alliance
  - Tag Team Championship (1 time)
- Pro Wrestling Illustrated
  - Tag Team of the Year Ranked No. 76 (2022)
- WrestlePro
  - WrestlePro Tag Team Championship (1 time)
