= Thunder Rosa =

Mexican professional wrestler (born 1986)

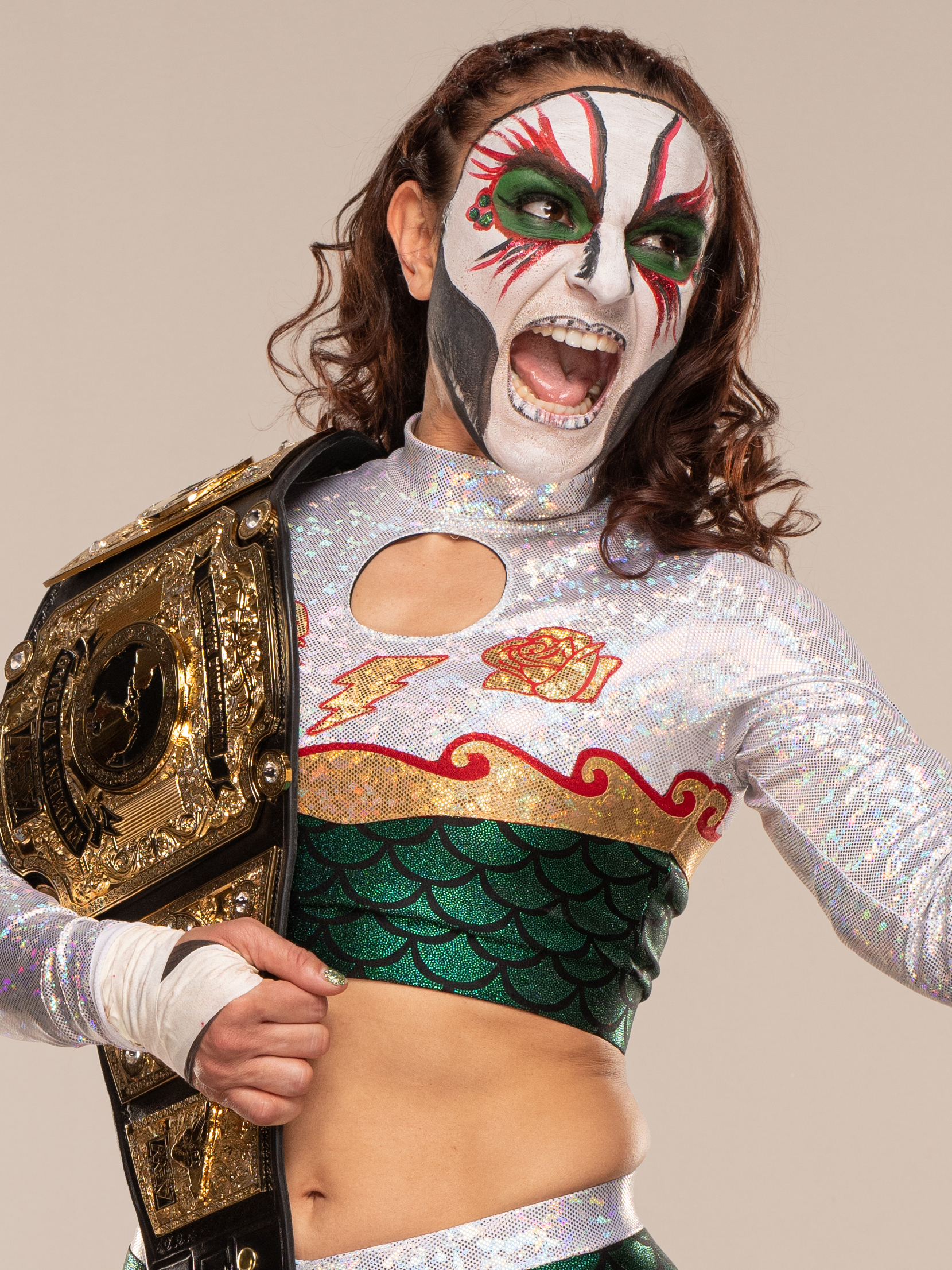
- Thunder Rosa as AEW Women's World Champion in April 2022

Personal information
- Born: July 22, 1986 (age 40) Tijuana, Baja California, Mexico
- Education: University of California, Berkeley (BA)
- Spouse: Brian Cervantes (m. 2006; sep. 2025)
- Children: 1
- Website: www.thunderrosa.net

Professional wrestling career
- Ring name(s): Kobra Moon; Serpiente; Serpiente del Mar; Thunder Rosa
- Billed height: 5 ft 3 in (1.60 m)
- Billed weight: 119 lb (54 kg)
- Billed from: The Graveyards of Tijuana, Mexico
- Trained by: Dylan Drake; Matt Carlos
- Debut: 2014

Melissa Cervantes (born July 22, 1986), known by her ring name Thunder Rosa, is a Mexican professional wrestler and former mixed martial artist. She is signed to both All Elite Wrestling (AEW) and Consejo Mundial de Lucha Libre (CMLL), where she is the Mexican National Women's Champion in her first reign. She also performs for Riot Cabaret Pro Wrestling, where she is the current Riot Cabaret Women's Champion in her first reign. In AEW, she is a former AEW Women's World Champion, being the first Mexican (male or female) to win a world title in the promotion. She debuted in 2014 and has also appeared in World Wonder Ring Stardom (Stardom), Impact Wrestling, and the National Wrestling Alliance (NWA).

Cervantes appeared in seasons 2 through 4 of the wrestling-based TV series Lucha Underground as Kobra Moon, leader of the Reptile Tribe; she won the Lucha Underground Trios Championship (with Daga and Jeremiah Snake). After the show ended, she resumed performing on the independent circuit, working in Women of Wrestling (WOW) in 2018 as Serpiente, and won the NWA World Women's Championship in 2019. Cervantes also founded and owns Mission Pro Wrestling (MPW), a Texas-based independent promotion devoted to women's wrestling.

Cervantes made her mixed martial arts debut in 2019 at Combate Americas (today Combate Global).

== Professional wrestling career ==
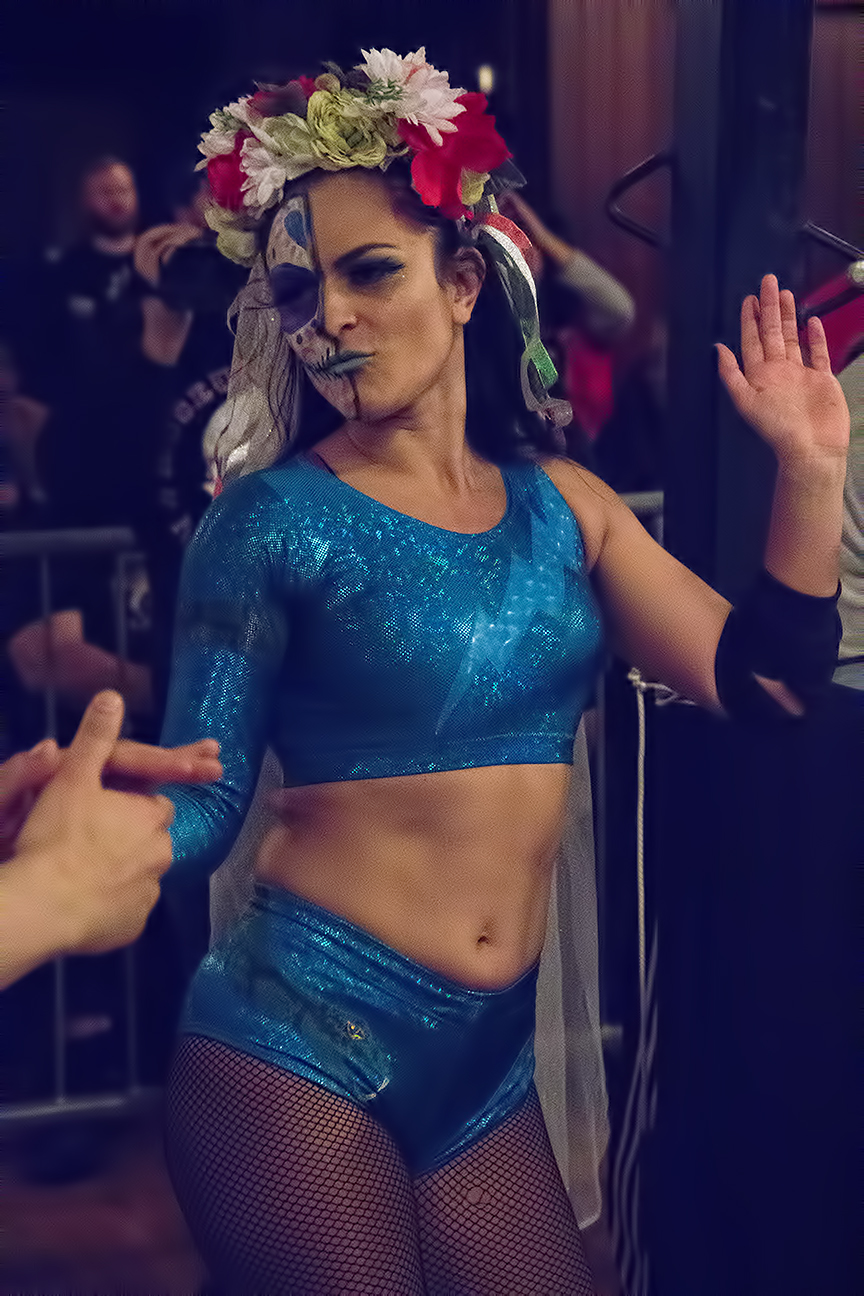
Thunder Rosa in 2017

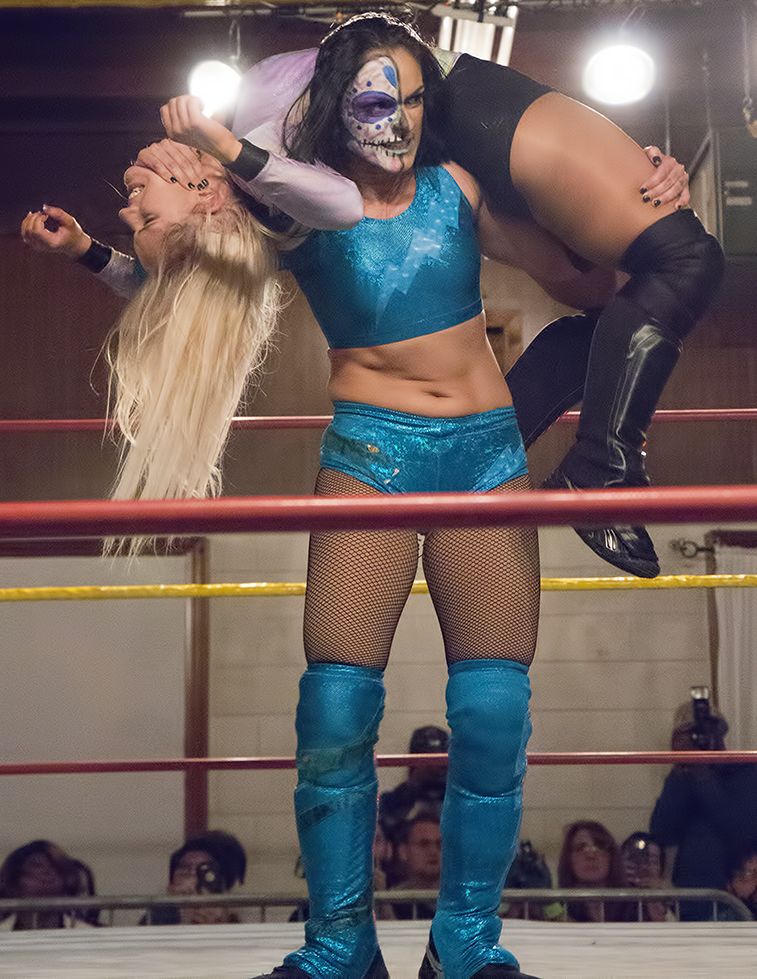
Thunder Rosa placing Shazza McKenzie in a Torture Rack

=== Early career (2014) ===
Cervantes made her wrestling debut in late 2014, in a Supreme Pro Wrestling battle royal in Sacramento, California. In 2015, she performed regularly throughout California, and on April 12, she made her Japanese debut for World Wonder Ring Stardom (aka "Stardom").

=== Lucha Underground (2015–2019) ===
Cervantes joined the cast of Lucha Underground in season 2 as Kobra Moon, leader of the Reptile Tribe; she would remain on the show for the remainder of its run. She was nominated for the 2015 Southern California Rookie of the Year Award and finished second to Douglas James.

In 2016 Cervantes returned to Stardom to take part in the 2016 Goddesses of Stardom Tag League, teaming with Holidead. She won the 2016 Southern California Women's Wrestler of the Year Award. She was released on March 26, 2019.

=== Ring of Honor (2018–2019) ===
On June 15, 2018, Thunder Rosa made her Ring of Honor debut on its ROH State Of The Art show, teaming with Kelly Klein against Sumie Sakai and Tenille Dashwood. On November 3 (which aired on tape delay on December 15) episode of ROH's eponymous weekly TV show, Rosa teamed with Holidead as "The Twisted Sisterz," defeating Britt Baker and Madison Rayne.

=== Women of Wrestling (2018–2019) ===
Cervantes worked through the October 2018 tapings on Women of Wrestling under her Kobra Moon ring name. Her first televised matched aired on March 1, 2019, where she was managed by Sophia Lopez as she defeated Azteca. With WOW renewed for a second season, Moon's name changed to Serpentine. On the September 14 episode of WOW, Serpentine unsuccessfully challenged Tessa Blanchard for the WOW World Championship.

=== Tokyo Joshi Pro (2019–2020) ===
On April 29, 2019, Thunder Rosa made her Tokyo Joshi Pro Wrestling debut, teaming with Yuki Aino against Mizuki and Yuka Sakazaki. In winning the International Princess Championship on January 5, 2020, from Maki Itoh, Rosa became the first gaijin titleholder in Tokyo Joshi Pro history. On October 7, Thunder Rosa announced she had relinquished the championship as COVID-19 restrictions precluded her from traveling to Japan.

=== National Wrestling Alliance (2019–2021) ===
Thunder Rosa made her National Wrestling Alliance (NWA) TV debut on the October 29, 2019, episode of NWA Power. After Marti Belle lost to Ashley Vox, Thunder Rosa entered the ring and extended her hand to Belle, which Belle declined as she left the ring. On the following episode, Rosa had her in-ring debut, defeating Ashley Vox and attacking her post-match. Rosa later attacked NWA World Women's Champion Allysin Kay, with Belle also attacking Kay and aligning with Rosa. On the November 19 episode of NWA Power, Belle and Thunder Rosa defeated Kay and Vox, after Melina distracted Kay, and aligning herself with Belle and Rosa. At NWA Hard Times on January 24, 2020, Thunder Rosa defeated Allysin Kay to capture the NWA World Women's Championship, becoming the first Mexican female wrestler to win the championship and also the first woman from her country to win a world title in a foreign country. She would lose the title against Serena Deeb on October 27, 2020, at UWN Primetime Live. Fightful Select reported on July 22, 2021, that her contract in NWA was bought out by All Elite Wrestling, allowing her to sign with AEW full time. NWA wished her well via their Twitter account.

=== Impact Wrestling (2021) ===
Thunder Rosa made her Impact debut on July 17, 2021, at its annual Slammiversary PPV as the mystery opponent for Impact Knockouts Champion Deonna Purrazzo.

=== All Elite Wrestling (2020–present) ===
==== Debut and signing (2020–2022) ====
Thunder Rosa made her All Elite Wrestling (AEW) debut on the August 22, 2020, episode of Dynamite, where she cut a promo on then-AEW Women's World Champion Hikaru Shida, and challenged her to a title match at the All Out pay-per-view show. On the September 2 episode of Dynamite, Thunder Rosa made her AEW in-ring debut, where she defeated Serena Deeb. At All Out, Thunder Rosa unsuccessfully challenged Shida for the AEW Women's World Championship. On the September 16 episode of Dynamite, Rosa successfully defended her NWA World Women's Championship against Ivelisse. After the match, Rosa was attacked by Diamante and Ivelisse, and was later saved by Shida, turning Rosa face in the process. A week later on Dynamite, Rosa teamed with Shida when they defeated Diamante and Ivelisse in a tag team match. On the November 18 episode of Dynamite, Rosa fought Deeb in a rematch for the NWA Women's Championship, but would lose following outside interference from Dr. Britt Baker. After the match, Rosa brawled with Baker.

On the March 17, 2021, episode of Dynamite, Rosa and Britt Baker became the first women to main event Dynamite; Rosa defeated Baker in an intense Unsanctioned Lights Out match that was highly praised by critics, and widely viewed as breaking down sexist assumptions that women wrestlers could not wrestle a "hardcore" style match. Eleven months after her debut, on her 35th birthday July 22, 2021, it was announced that Rosa had officially signed a full-time deal with AEW. On the November 24 special episode of Dynamite being Thanksgiving Eve on November 24, Rosa wrestled in the AEW TBS women's championship tournament where she faced Jamie Hayter and beat her. On the December 29 special episode of Dynamite being AEW New Year's Smash, Rosa faced Jade Cargill in the semi-finals of the TBS tournament which Rosa lost due to interference by Mercedes Martinez.

==== AEW Women's World Champion and injury (2022–2023) ====
On March 6, 2022, at Revolution Rosa faced Britt Baker for the AEW Women's World Championship however due to Baker, Jamie Hayter and Rebel distracting the referee and cheating this resulted in Rosa losing. On March 16 special edition episode of Dynamite being St. Patrick's Day Slam, Rosa won her first AEW Women's World Championship after she defeated Baker in a Steel Cage match and becomes the first Mexican (male or female) to win a world title in the promotion. On April 16, Rosa defended her championship against Nyla Rose in the main event of AEW Battle of The Belts ll which Rosa won. On May 29 at Double or Nothing Rosa defended her championship against Serena Deeb and won. On June 8 on Dynamite Rosa successfully defended her championship against Maria Shafir. At AEW x NJPW: Forbidden Door, Rosa successfully defended her championship against Toni Storm. On July 27 at Fight For The Fallen Rosa defended her championship against Miyu Yamashita which Yamashita earned a shot at after she defeated Thunder Rosa in TJPW. On August 5 at AEW Battle Of The Belts III, Rosa defeated Jamie Hayter to retain championship. On August 24 at Dynamite, Rosa revealed she could not defend her championship due to a back injury, which then lead to allegations claiming the injury was fake which Rosa denied. Initially the company kept Rosa's championship reign intact in her absence while moving forward with an interim champion. This decision was rescinded three months later, as it was announced on the November 23 episode of Dynamite that Rosa had relinquished her championship not only presently, but retroactively as well, with both Toni Storm and Jamie Hayter having their interim title reigns recognized as fully lineal runs with the Women's World Championship.

==== Return from injury (2023–present) ====
On the December 16, 2023, episode of Collision, Rosa made her return where she rescued Abadon as they were attacked by the TBS Champion Julia Hart and Skye Blue. On April 21, 2024, at Dynasty, Rosa unsuccessfully challenged Toni Storm for the AEW Women's World Championship. After losing to Storm, Rosa began a feud with Deonna Purrazzo on the April 27 episode of Rampage, after Purrazzo attacked her after their match. This led to a singles bout on May 26 at Double or Nothing Zero Hour and in a no disqualification match on June 15 during the one year anniversary of Collision, where Rosa was defeated in both matches. On the July 19 episode of Collision, Rosa lost to Purrazzo for the third time in a lumberjack match following assistance from Taya Valkyrie. On the August 3 episode of Collision, Purrazzo accepted Rosa's challenge for a Texas bullrope match on next week's Collision, which Rosa was victorious, ending their feud. Rosa would then take time off to recover from a concussion. On December 28 at Worlds End, Rosa unsuccessfully challenged Mariah May for the AEW Women's World Championship in a Tijuana Street Fight.

On the March 29, 2025 episode of Collision, Rosa announced her entry into the women's bracket of the Owen Hart Cup, a tournament where the winner will receive an AEW Women's World Championship match at All In. On the April 9 episode of Dynamite, Rosa was defeated by Kris Statlander in the quarter-finals, eliminating her from the tournament. On July 12 at All In, Rosa competed in the women's Casino Gauntlet match, which was won by Athena. After All In, Rosa took time off to heal from an undisclosed injury.

Rosa made her return to television on the February 18, 2026 episode of Dynamite in a backstage segment with Kris Statlander.

=== Lucha Libre AAA Worldwide (2022) ===
During Triplemanía XXX: Tijuana, Taya Valkyrie called out Thunder Rosa, asking to prove the latter is the best female wrestling from Mexico. Rosa reacted on Social Media accepting the challenge. On August 8, Lucha Libre AAA Worldwide held a media conference to confirm the match and the event's match card.

=== Consejo Mundial de Lucha Libre (2025–present) ===
Rosa made her Consejo Mundial de Lucha Libre (CMLL) debut on the co-promoted show Fantastica Mania Mexico on June 20, 2025, losing to La Jarochita. Rosa would continue to appear in CMLL for the rest of the year on their flagship show Super Viernes.

On April 3, 2026, at Super Viernes, Rosa teamed with India Sioux and Marcela to defeat Olympia, Persephone, and Princesa Sugehit. After the match, it was announced that Rosa had signed with CMLL, while also keeping her contract with AEW. On July 19, Rosa won an eight-woman elimination match to become the number one contender for the Mexican National Women's Championship. On July 31, she defeated India Sioux to win the championship, becoming a double champion, holding the Mexican National Women's Championship and Riot Cabaret Women's Championship simultaneously.

== Professional wrestling style and persona ==
Cervantes' "Thunder Rosa" ring name is a tribute to Thunder Road, a rehabilitation center for teenagers Cervantes worked at for over two years, which overlapped with the training and launch phases of her wrestling career. It was a collaboration between Cervantes, her husband and a Thunder Road coworker on a car ride home after attending a wrestling show. Cervantes wanted a name that appealed to both Latinos and non-Latino Americans, would honor her work with teens, and be easy for fans to chant during her matches. For her finishing moves, Cervantes uses a modified scoop slam piledriver dubbed the Fire Thunder Rosa, a guillotine drop with a hammerlock dubbed the La Rosa Driver, and a dragon sleeper dubbed the Snake Sleeper.

The paint on her face symbolizes the rebirth of Cervantes' career, after a concussion in Japan put her out of work for a month. Cervantes' husband suggested that when she resumed performing, she also resume the face paint to stand out from other wrestlers.

== Mixed martial arts career ==
Melissa Cervantes
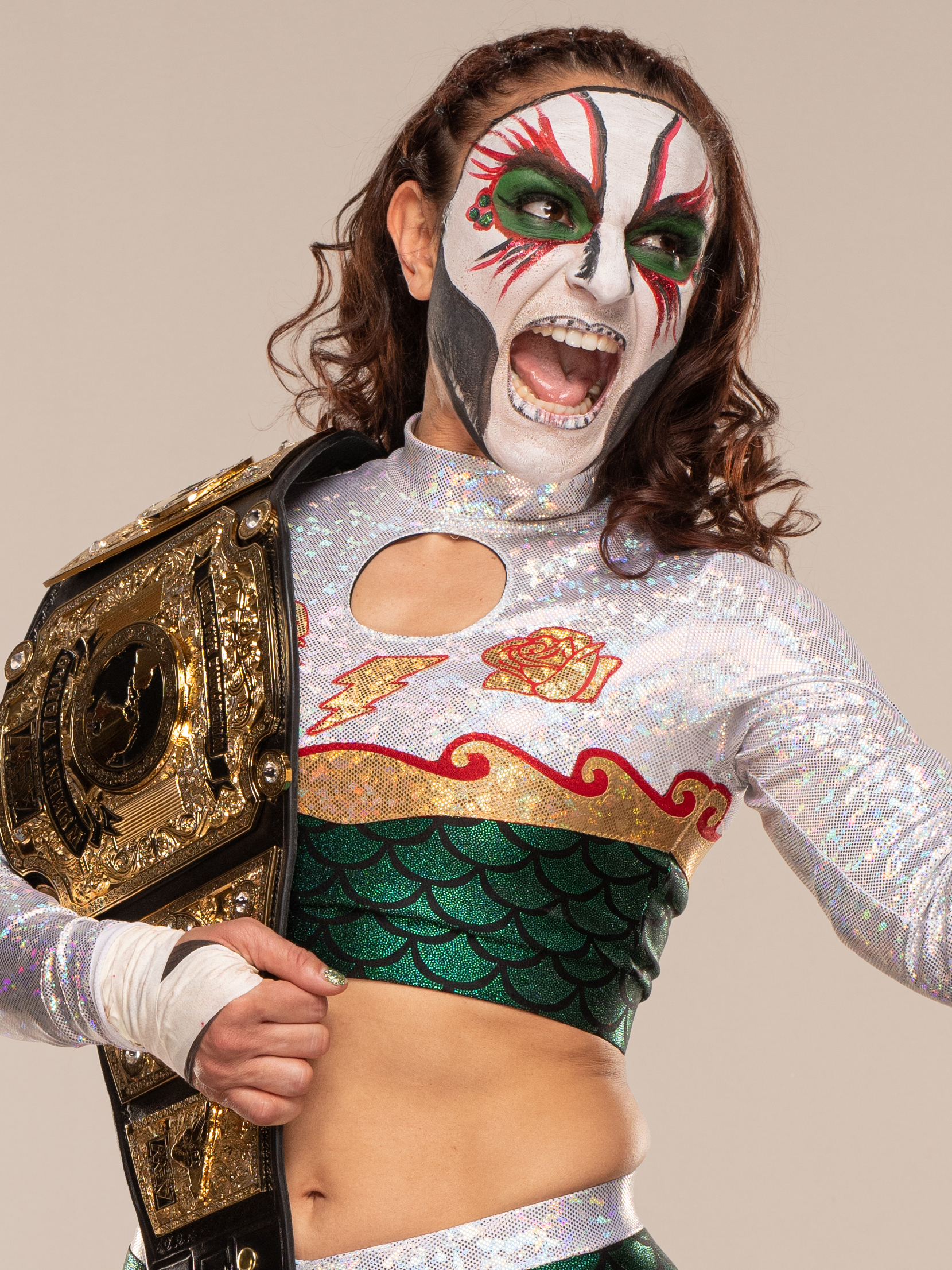
- Born: Tijuana, Baja California, Mexico
- Weight: 115 lb (52 kg)
- Division: Strawweight
- Style: Brazilian Jiu-Jitsu
- Team: Brazilian Top Team
- Years active: 2019

Mixed martial arts record
- Total: 1
- Wins: 0
- Losses: 1
- By decision: 1

Other information
- Mixed martial arts record from Sherdog

=== Combate Americas/Global (2019–2021; 2022) ===
On September 13, 2019, it was confirmed that Cervantes had signed with Combate Americas. Her first fight took place on November 8 in San Antonio, Texas. She lost the fight by unanimous decision against Nadine Mandiau. On October 10, 2021, Cervantes announced that she had officially retired from MMA when she signed a contract with All Elite Wrestling due to not having the time to commit to training.

In June 2022, it was confirmed that Thunder Rosa would return to Combate to do commentary on the July 15 and 22 shows.

=== Mixed martial arts record ===
Professional record breakdown
1 match	0 wins	1 loss
By knockout	0	0
By submission	0	0
By decision	0	1

Res.	Record	Opponent	Method	Event	Date	Round	Time	Location	Notes
Loss	0–1	Nadine Mandiau	Decision (unanimous)	Combate Americas: San Antonio	November 8, 2019	3	3:00	San Antonio, Texas, United States	

Thunder Rosa

YouTube information
- Channel: Thunder Rosa
- Years active: 2014–present
- Genre: Vlogging
- Subscribers: 117 thousand
- Views: 5.31 million
- Last updated: September 7, 2026

== Personal life ==
Before wrestling and during the early years of her wrestling career, Cervantes was a social worker, doing case work with at-risk young adults struggling with mental illness, homelessness, substance abuse, and other life issues. After she realized that season three of Lucha Underground would pay more than her income as a social worker, Cervantes' husband encouraged her to focus 100% of her time and effort on wrestling.

Cervantes married Brian Cervantes on December 21, 2006, and together they have a son Anakin, born on August 31, 2005. In November 2025, Cervantes announced her separation from Brian on social media.

Cervantes graduated from the University of California, Berkeley in 2010 with a Bachelor's Degree in sociology. She became a US citizen on February 21, 2019. On July 1, 2026, the 37th mayor of San Diego, Todd Gloria, declared that July 1 would be officially recognized as "Thunder Rosa Day" in San Diego.

=== Lucha Underground lawsuit ===
On February 6, 2019, it was reported that Cervantes, Ivelisse Vélez, Joey Ryan, and Jorge Luis Alcantar (aka, El Hijo del Fantasma/King Cuerno) had filed a class-action lawsuit in California against Lucha Underground's coproducers: the El Rey Network and the Baba-G production company. The performers alleged that their Lucha Underground contracts were illegal under California law because they unfairly restricted their ability to work in their chosen profession. In an interview with Chris Van Vliet, Cervantes said that she joined Lucha Underground for season 2 under a five-year contract. However, production of the series ended after less than four full seasons' worth of episodes were made. This left Cervantes and others—who, as professional wrestlers in the US, work as independent contractors—trapped in a situation where they were effectively fired yet also contractually blocked from working for any other wrestling companies until their Lucha Underground contracts expired (i.e., at least 1–2 years later), or they each paid a US$5,000 escape clause fee. By March 26, 2019, all lawsuits had been settled in the wrestlers' favor, and they were freed from their LU contracts.

== Championships and accomplishments ==
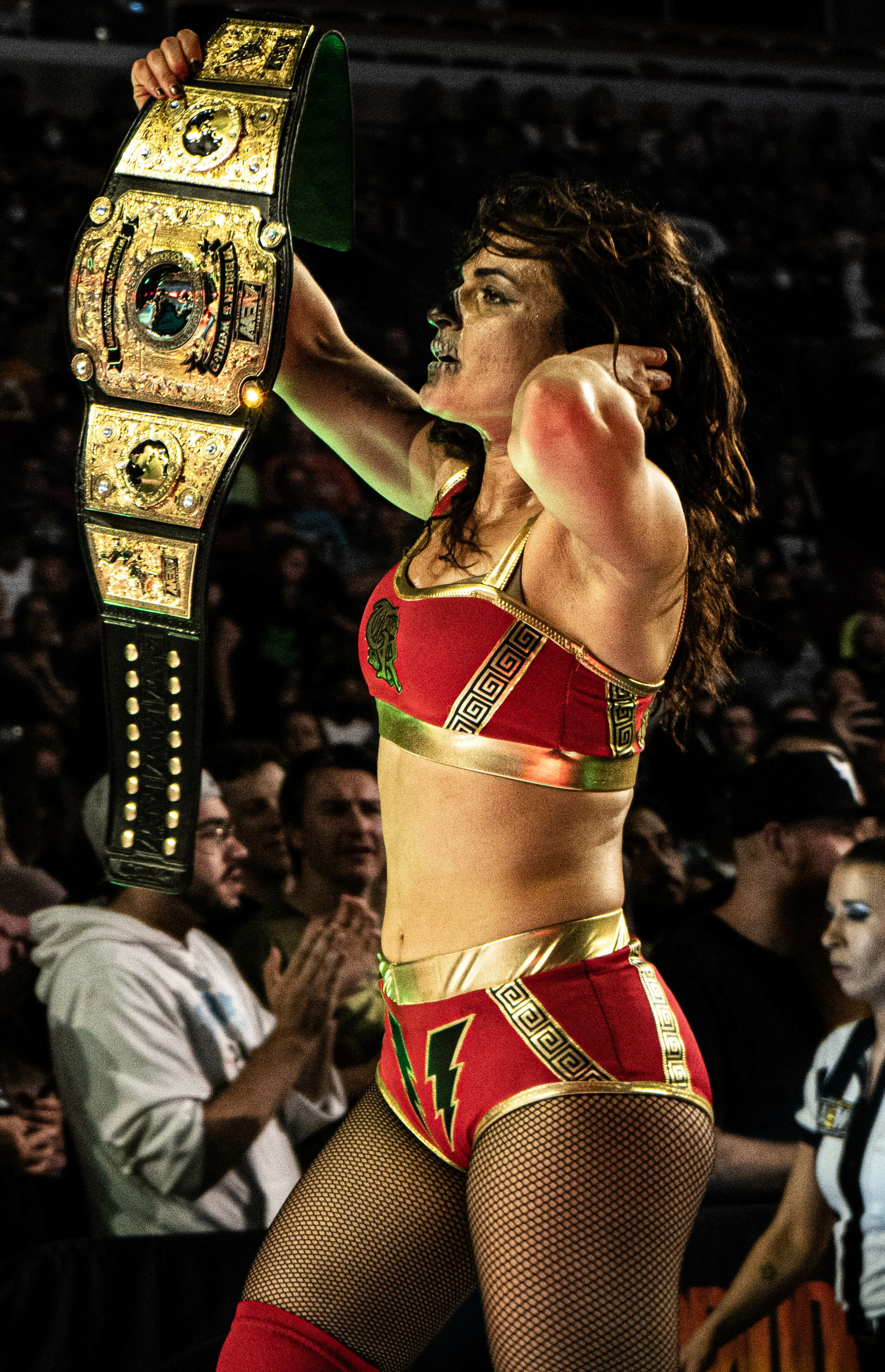
Rosa is a former AEW Women's World Champion

- 4th Rope Wrestling
  - Babs Wingo Women's Battle Royale
- All Elite Wrestling
  - AEW Women's World Championship (1 time)
- Allied Independent Wrestling Federations
  - AIWF International Women's Championship (1 time)
- Consejo Mundial de Lucha Libre
  - Mexican National Women's Championship (1 time, current)
- Gold Rush Pro Wrestling
  - GRPW Lady Luck Championship (1 time)
- East Bay Pro Wrestling
  - EBPW Ladies Champion (1 time)
- Inspire Pro Wrestling
  - Inspire Pro Twin Dragon Connection Championship (3 times) – with Cherry Ramons (1), Raychell Rose (1), Steve O Reno (1)
- Lucha Underground
  - Lucha Underground Trios Championship (1 time) – with Daga and Jeremiah Snake
- Mission Pro Wrestling
  - MPW Year-End Award (2 times)
    - Match of the Year Award (2020) vs. Lindsay Snow on September 18
    - Moment of the Year Award (2021) Rosa spearing David LaGreca through the cans on November 20
- National Wrestling Alliance
  - NWA World Women's Championship (1 time)
- Pro Wrestling Illustrated
  - Match of the Year (2021) vs. Britt Baker
  - Ranked No. 3 of the top 150 female wrestlers in the PWI Women's 150 in 2022
- Riot Cabaret Pro Wrestling
  - Riot Cabaret Women's Championship (1 time, current)
- Shine Wrestling
  - Shine Tag Team Championship (1 time) – with Holidead
- SoCal Uncensored
  - Southern California Women's Wrestler of the Year (2016)
- Tokyo Joshi Pro Wrestling
  - International Princess Championship (1 time)
- Vendetta Pro Wrestling
  - NWA International Tag Team Championship (1 time) – with Holidead
- Warrior Wrestling
  - Warrior Wrestling Women's Championship (1 time)
- Women's Wrestling Hall of Fame
  - WWHOF Award (1 time)
    - Pro Wrestler of the Year (2025) – shared with Rhea Ripley
