= Beach Break (2024) =

All Elite Wrestling two-part television special

- Promotional poster for the Dynamite broadcast, featuring various AEW wrestlers
- Promotion: All Elite Wrestling
- Date: July 3, 2024 (aired July 3 and 5, 2024)
- City: Chicago, Illinois
- Venue: Wintrust Arena
- Attendance: 5,291

Beach Break chronology
← Previous; 2022	Next → 2025

AEW Dynamite special episodes chronology
← Previous; Big Business	Next → Dynamite 250

AEW Rampage special episodes chronology
← Previous; Homecoming	Next → Royal Rampage

The 2024 Beach Break was a two-part professional wrestling television special produced by All Elite Wrestling (AEW). It was the third Beach Break event and took place on July 3, 2024, at Wintrust Arena in Chicago, Illinois. The two-part event was broadcast as special episodes of AEW's weekly television programs, Wednesday Night Dynamite and Friday Night Rampage. Dynamite aired live on TBS while Rampage aired on tape delay on TNT on July 5. This was the first Beach Break event since 2022 and it was the last in which the second part aired as Rampage due to the program's cancellation at the end of 2024; Saturday Night Collision took its place the following year.

A combined total of nine matches were contested at the event, with four taped for the July 5, 2024 episode of Rampage. In the main event of the Dynamite broadcast, Will Ospreay defeated Daniel Garcia to retain the AEW International Championship. The opening bout was a men's Owen Hart Foundation Tournament semi-finals match in which Bryan Danielson defeated Pac to advance to the finals. In the main event of the Rampage broadcast, Mariah May defeated Hikaru Shida in the Women's Owen Hart Foundation Tournament semi-finals, thus advancing to the finals.

== Production ==
=== Background ===
In February 2021, All Elite Wrestling (AEW) held a television special titled Beach Break, which aired as a special episode of Wednesday Night Dynamite. The event replaced Bash at the Beach as the promotion's midwinter beach-themed event. A second Beach Break was held on January 26, 2022, and aired as a two-part event as special episodes of Dynamite and Friday Night Rampage, thus establishing Beach Break as a recurring event. An event was not held in 2023, however, it was scheduled to return in 2024 but pushed back to July. It took place at the United Center in Chicago, Illinois on July 3, 2024, and like the prior event, Dynamite aired live on TBS while Rampage aired on tape delay on TNT on July 5.

=== Storylines ===
Beach Break featured professional wrestling matches that involved different wrestlers from pre-existing scripted feuds and storylines. Storylines were produced on AEW's weekly television programs, Dynamite, Rampage, and Collision and The Dark Order's YouTube series Being The Dark Order.

On the June 26 episode of Dynamite Daniel Garcia interrupted MJF, after brief back and forth MJF suggested a match between him and Garcia at All In at Wembley Stadium. Will Ospreay interrupted and said he had his eyes on both men and that he respected Garcia, leading to Ospreay announcing he'd defend the AEW International Championship against Garcia at Beach Break and the AEW World Championship if he beat Swerve Strickland at Forbidden Door on June 30, with the match subsequently becoming official for the next week's Dynamite. On June 30, Ospreay failed to beat Strickland, thus the match was only for the International title.

On the June 19 episode of Dynamite Kris Statlander defeated Nyla Rose in the first round of the Owen Hart Cup, advancing to the semi-finals. On the June 21 episode (taped June 19) of Rampage Willow Nightingale defeated Serena Deeb to advance to the semi-finals. As a result, both women were scheduled to wrestle one another in the semi-finals at Beach Break.

On the June 19 episode of Dynamite Pac defeated Claudio Castagnoli to advance to the semi-finals of the Owen Hart Cup. At Forbidden Door on June 30 Bryan Danielson defeated Shingo Takagi to advance to the semi-finals. As a result, Pac and Danielson were scheduled to face each other at Beach Break.

On the June 26 episode of Dynamite All Elite Wrestling EVPs Matthew and Nicholas Jackson announced that Jeff Jarrett would face a wildcard that would be revealed at the event with the winner facing Jay White in the semi-finals.

=== Event ===
Other on-screen personnel
Role	Name
Commentators	Excalibur (Dynamite and Rampage)
Commentators	Tony Schiavone (Dynamite and Rampage)
Commentators	Taz (Dynamite)
Commentators	Chris Jericho (Trios)
Commentators	Don Callis (The Don Callis Family vs. Private Party)
Commentators	Roderick Strong (Kyle O'Reilly vs. GPA)
Ring announcers	Justin Roberts (Dynamite)
Ring announcers	Arkady Aura (Rampage)
Referees	Aubrey Edwards
Referees	Bryce Remsburg
Referees	Brandon Martinez
Referees	Paul Turner
Referees	Rick Knox
Interviewer	Renee Paquette

Before the first match, Renee Paquette interviewed Daniel Garcia and Matt Mernard ahead of Garcia's match against Will Ospreay for the AEW International Championship later in the night. MJF interrupted and told Garcia he would be in his corner in the main event. When Garcia asked about the All In match MJF promised the last week, MJF told him to focus on that later. After Garcia walked away, Mernard told MJF that he used to think he was full of it, but now he did not and the two shook hands.

==== Dynamite ====
In the first match of the Dynamite broadcast, Bryan Danielson and PAC faced each other for a spot in the Owen Hart Foundation Cup Men's Tournament finals. In the end, Danielson trapped PAC in the LeBell lock, only for PAC to reverse but Danielson countered with a rollup for the three count.

After that, Mark Briscoe came out to the ring and stated that Jack Perry got lucky when he won the AEW TNT Championship at Forbidden Door. Perry then entered the ring behind Briscoe and attacked him with the championship. Kyle O'Reilly came out to defend Briscoe but Perry's Elite stablemates, The Young Bucks (Matthew Jackson and Nicholas Jackson) and Kazuchika Okada, came out and beat down Briscoe and O'Reilly. The Acclaimed then came out and saved both men and The Elite retreated by hopping over the barricade.

Next, Kris Statlander, accompanied by Stokely Hathaway, and Willow Nightingale faced off with the winner advancing to the Owen Hart Foundation Cup Women's final. Both women brawled on the stage before the match started but Nightingale delivered a pounce to Statlander. Eventually both women got in the ring and the match started. In the end, Hathaway gave Statlander a chain before distracting the referee. Statlander went to hit Nightingale but Nightingale saw it coming and rolled up Statlander to win the match.

After that, Dr. Britt Baker, D.M.D. came out to the ring and addressed her return at Forbidden Door, but Mercedes Moné interrupted her. After a back and forth on the mic, Baker challenged Moné for the AEW TBS Championship, but Moné refused, telling Baker to go to the back of the line.

Next, Chris Jericho came to the ring and evicted Taz from the commentary desk on orders of Matthew and Nicholas Jackson. Jericho then sat at the desk and announced he would do commentary for the next match.

After that, Hook, Katsuyori Shibata, and Samoa Joe faced off against Cage of Agony (Bishop Kaun, Brian Cage, and Toa Liona). In the end, Hook, Shibata, and Joe got submissions on all three men, causing them all to tap out, winning the match. After the match, Big Bill and Bryan Keith attacked Hook, Shibata, and Joe. Jericho came off commentary and beat Hook in the ring. Keith got a table from ringside and Big Bill proceeded to chokeslam Hook through the table.

Next, Jeff Jarrett faced off against the wild card, handpicked by Matthew and Nicholas Jackson, which was revealed to be a returning "Hangman" Adam Page. Although Jarrett put up a fighting effort, in the end Page, performed Dead Eye on Jarrett to advance to the finals.

The main event of the Dynamite broadcast saw Will Ospreay defend the AEW International Championship against Daniel Garcia. MJF entered first to be in Garcia's corner followed by the participants. In the end, MJF passed his Dynamite Diamond Ring to Garcia and told him to hit Ospreay with it. Garcia refused and gave the ring back to MJF only to be hit with the Hidden Blade by Ospreay, who pinned Garcia for the three count to retain.

After Ospreay left, MJF congratulated Garcia and helped him up and raised his hand. Garcia got a standing ovation from the live crowd only for MJF to low blow Garcia and attack him with the ring, turning heel for the first time since 2023. Matt Mernard ran down to the ring in order to help Garcia but MJF hit him with the ring. Both Garcia and Mernard ended up becoming bloodied and then MJF performed a top rope tombstone on Garcia. Ospreay ran down to the ring but MJF escaped into the crowd and started to antagonize the fans in the stands. Garcia was then stretchered off by medical personnel, as Ospreay followed behind.

==== Rampage ====
In the opening match of the Rampage broadcast, Rush took on Komander with Alex Abrahantes. In the end, Rush delivered the Bull's Horns to Komander and pinned him for the win.

After that, The Don Callis Family (Konosuke Takeshita and Kyle Fletcher), accompanied by Don Callis, faced off against Private Party (Zay and Quen). In the end, Fletcher delivered a Tombston Piledriver to Quen and pinned him for the victory.

Next, Kyle O'Reilly faced GPA with Roderick Strong on commentary. In the end, O'Reilly got an armbar on GPA who tapped out giving O'Reilly the win. After the match, Strong and the rest of The Undisputed Kingdom attempted to celebrate with O'Reilly but O'Reilly left the ring.

In the main event of the Rampage broadcast, Mariah May, accompanied by Luther and "Timeless" Toni Storm, faced off against Hikaru Shida with the winner advancing to the Owen Hart Cup finals. In the end, Toni Storm got on the apron and distracted Shida and May headbutted Shida, Shida then attempted the katana only for May to roll up Shida for the victory and advance to the finals. After the match, Storm celebrated with May in the ring.

== Results ==
Dynamite (aired live July 3)
No.	Results	Stipulations	Times
1	Bryan Danielson defeated Pac by pinfall	Men's Owen Hart Foundation Tournament Semi Final match	16:50
2	Willow Nightingale defeated Kris Statlander (with Stokely Hathaway) by pinfall	Women's Owen Hart Foundation Tournament Semi Final match	8:40
3	Hook, Katsuyori Shibata and Samoa Joe defeated Cage of Agony (Bishop Kaun, Brian Cage, and Toa Liona) by submission	Trios match	9:10
4	"Hangman" Adam Page defeated Jeff Jarrett by pinfall	Men's Owen Hart Cup Tournament Quarter Final match	11:00
5	Will Ospreay (c) defeated Daniel Garcia (with MJF) by pinfall	Singles match for the AEW International Championship	14:25
(c) / – the champion(s) heading into the match

Rampage (taped July 3; aired July 5)
No.	Results	Stipulations	Times
1	Rush defeated Komander (with Alex Abrahantes) by pinfall	Singles match	12:00
2	The Don Callis Family (Konosuke Takeshita and Kyle Fletcher) (with Don Callis) defeated Private Party (Zay and Quen) by pinfall	Tag team match	10:00
3	Kyle O'Reilly defeated GPA by submission	Singles match	1:30
4	Mariah May (with Luther and "Timeless" Toni Storm) defeated Hikaru Shida by pinfall	Women's Owen Hart Cup Tournament Semi Final match	12:00
