= Double or Nothing (2025) =

All Elite Wrestling pay-per-view event

- Promotional poster featuring Will Ospreay, Mercedes Moné, "Hangman" Adam Page, and Jamie Hayter
- Promotion: All Elite Wrestling
- Date: May 25, 2025
- City: Glendale, Arizona
- Venue: Desert Diamond Arena
- Attendance: 8,200
- Buy rate: 126,000

Pay-per-view chronology
← Previous; Dynasty	Next → All In

Double or Nothing chronology
← Previous; 2024	Next → 2026

The 2025 Double or Nothing was a professional wrestling pay-per-view (PPV) event produced by All Elite Wrestling (AEW). It was the seventh annual Double or Nothing event and took place on May 25, 2025, at the Desert Diamond Arena in Glendale, Arizona, during Memorial Day weekend. With the exception of the 2020 and 2021 events, which were held at Daily's Place in Jacksonville, Florida due to the COVID-19 pandemic, this was the first Double or Nothing held outside of the Las Vegas Strip in Paradise, Nevada. Additionally, it was AEW's first PPV in Arizona and the second Double or Nothing to feature the finals of the men's and women's Owen Hart Foundation Tournament. Like the 2023 edition, the event went head-to-head with WWE's NXT Battleground.

Eleven matches were contested at the event, including two on the "Buy In" pre-show. In the main event, "Hangman" Adam Page defeated Will Ospreay to win the Men's Owen Hart Foundation Cup Tournament, while Mercedes Moné defeated Jamie Hayter to win the Women's Owen Hart Foundation Cup Tournament in the opening bout. In other prominent matches, Kenny Omega, Swerve Strickland, Willow Nightingale, and The Opps (Samoa Joe, Powerhouse Hobbs, and Katsuyori Shibata) defeated Death Riders (Jon Moxley, Claudio Castagnoli, Marina Shafir, and Wheeler Yuta) and The Young Bucks (Matthew Jackson and Nicholas Jackson) in the Anarchy in the Arena match.

The event garnered positive reviews, with acclaim directed towards the Anarchy in the Arena match and the finals of the Men's Owen Hart Foundation Tournament, the latter being described as one of the best matches of the year. Sports Illustrated would go on to name the event "Best Show of the Year" in their 2025 Wrestling Awards.

== Production ==
=== Background ===
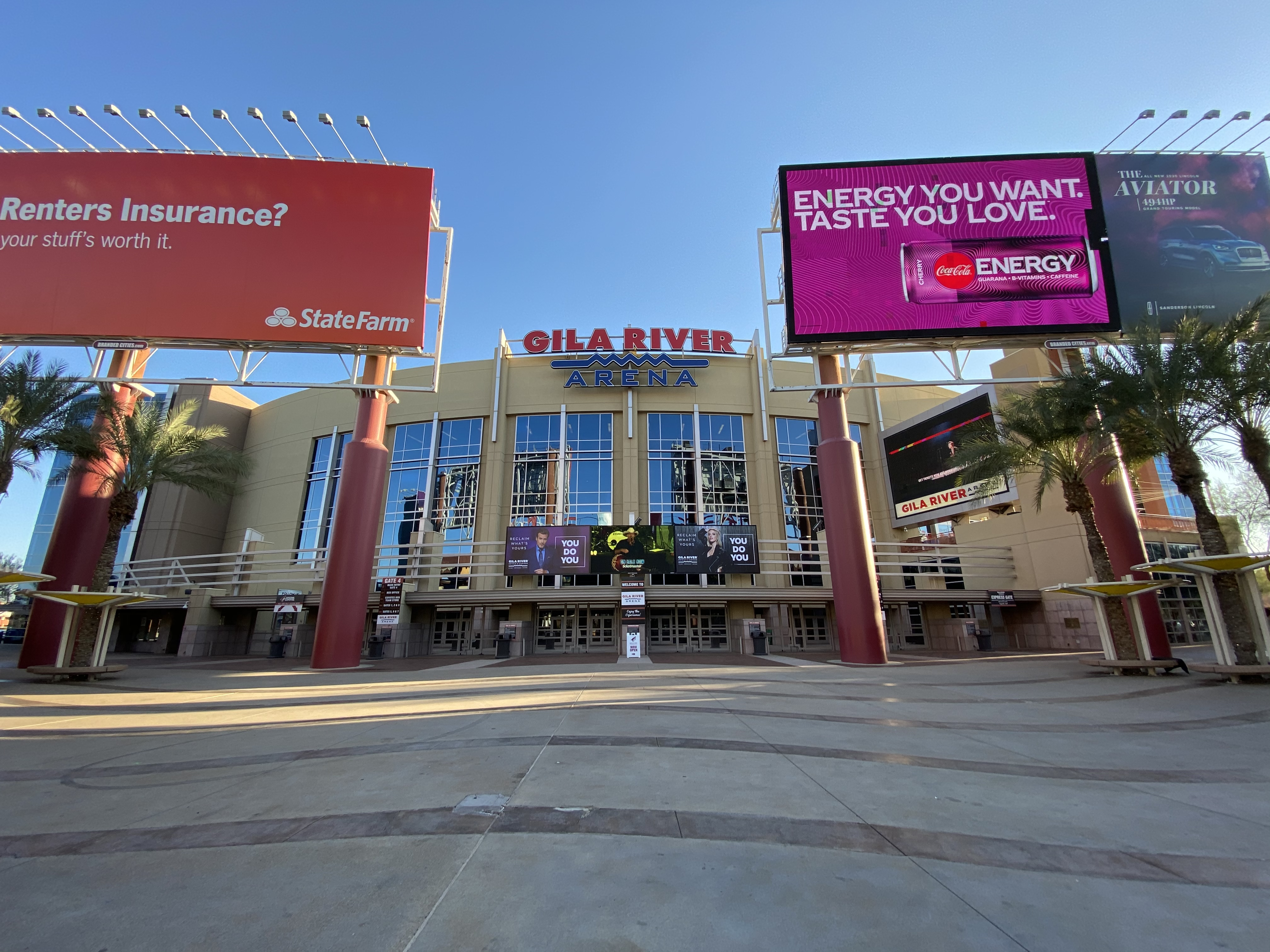
Double or Nothing 2025 was held at the Desert Diamond Arena in Glendale, Arizona. This was All Elite Wrestling's first event held at this venue, and was also the company's first pay-per-view event to be held in the U.S. state of Arizona.

Double or Nothing is considered one of All Elite Wrestling's (AEW) marquee events, having first been held in 2019, which was the promotion's first professional wrestling event and first pay-per-view (PPV) event produced. It is held annually in May during Memorial Day weekend and is one of AEW's "Big Five" PPVs, which includes All In, All Out, Full Gear, and Revolution, the promotions five biggest annual shows. With the exception of the events held during the COVID-19 pandemic in 2020 and 2021, Double or Nothing was traditionally held at either the MGM Grand Garden Arena or the T-Mobile Arena on the Las Vegas Strip in Paradise, Nevada, adopting a Vegas (or casino) theme.

On February 19, 2025, AEW announced that the seventh annual Double or Nothing would be held on May 25, 2025, at the Desert Diamond Arena in Glendale, Arizona, marking the first Double or Nothing to be held outside of the Las Vegas area since the event's inception in 2019 (excluding the two COVID era events), as well as the first AEW PPV event to take place in the U.S. state of Arizona. The venue's namesake came from a naming rights deal with Desert Diamond Casinos, keeping the Double or Nothing event in line with its casino theme.

As with the 2023 event, Double or Nothing went head-to-head with Battleground, a livestreaming event produced by WWE for its developmental brand, NXT. According to WWE executive Shawn Michaels back in 2023, the scheduling was not intended for WWE to go head-to-head with AEW, but that it was just due to the holiday (Memorial Day weekend) as he said WWE events had always done well on holidays.

=== Storylines ===
Other on-screen personnel
Role	Name
Commentators	Excalibur
Commentators	Tony Schiavone
Commentators	Taz
Commentators	MVP (Hurt Syndicate vs. Sons of Texas)
Commentators	Don Callis (Paragon vs. Don Callis Family)
Spanish Commentators	Carlos Cabrera
Spanish Commentators	Alvaro Riojas
Spanish Commentators	Ariel Levy
Ring announcer	Justin Roberts (PPV)
Ring announcer	Arkady Aura (Pre-show & PPV)
Referees	Aubrey Edwards
Referees	Bryce Remsburg
Referees	Mike Posey
Referees	Paul Turner
Referees	Rick Knox
Referees	Stephon Smith
Interviewers	Lexy Nair
Interviewers	Alex Marvez
Pre-show hosts	Renee Paquette
Pre-show hosts	RJ City
Pre-show hosts	Jeff Jarrett

Double or Nothing featured professional wrestling matches that involved different wrestlers from pre-existing feuds and storylines. Storylines were produced on AEW's weekly television programs, Dynamite and Collision.

On April 2, 2025, the competitors for the Owen Hart Cup were revealed for both the men's and the women's tournaments, with the finals of each scheduled for Double or Nothing. In the men's semi-finals, Will Ospreay defeated Konosuke Takeshita at Dynamite: Spring BreakThru on April 16, while "Hangman" Adam Page defeated Kyle Fletcher on the April 30 episode of Dynamite to advance, setting up the men's final between Ospreay and Page. Meanwhile, in the women's semi-finals, Mercedes Moné defeated Athena at Dynamite: Spring BreakThru, while Jamie Hayter defeated Kris Statlander on the April 23 episode of Dynamite, setting up the women's final between Moné and Hayter.

After winning their match on the special Beach Break episode of Dynamite on May 14, The Hurt Syndicate's manager MVP announced that Bobby Lashley and Shelton Benjamin would defend the AEW World Tag Team Championship at Double or Nothing against the winners of a number one contenders match, which took place on the May 17 episode of Collision between CRU (Action Andretti and Lio Rush) and The Sons of Texas (Dustin Rhodes and Sammy Guevara), won by the latter.

On the May 14 episode of Dynamite, Mina Shirakawa won an AEW Women's World Championship four-way eliminator match after pinning the reigning champion, "Timeless" Toni Storm. Due to the match's stipulation, since she had pinned the champion, Shirakawa earned a title match against Storm. It was then announced that the match would take place at Double or Nothing, subsequently serving as a rematch from the prior year's Forbidden Door event.

Over the weeks before Double or Nothing, the now-heel FTR (Cash Wheeler and Dax Harwood) attacked various members of the AEW roster, including Daniel Garcia. On the May 8 episode of Collision, Garcia faced Harwood in a singles match that ended in disqualification when commentator Nigel McGuinness got involved after Harwood had verbally berated McGuinness about his reaction to the letter that FTR had given to him and Tony Schiavone on the April 17 episode. On the following episode of Dynamite, FTR's manager Stokely interrupted an interview involving Garcia and McGuinness, on FTR's behalf, in order to issue a challenge for a tag team match at Double or Nothing, which McGuinness initially rejected despite Garcia's agreement. FTR then came out and assaulted both men before being fended off by a crowbar-wielding Matt Menard. On the May 17 episode of Collision, McGuinness announced that he had changed his mind and accepted FTR's challenge, thus making the match official.

At Dynasty on April 6, The Young Bucks (Matthew Jackson and Nicholas Jackson) returned and interfered in the main event, helping Jon Moxley retain his AEW World Championship against Swerve Strickland. At Dynamite: Spring BreakThru, The Opps (Samoa Joe, Katsuyori Shibata, and Powerhouse Hobbs) defeated Death Riders (Moxley, Claudio Castagnoli, and Wheeler Yuta) for the AEW World Trios Championship. (Note: Moxley filled in for an injured Pac.) Joe then began a feud with Moxley, culminating in a Steel Cage match for Moxley's world championship at Dynamite: Beach Break on May 14 where Moxley retained. At the end of the match, New Japan Pro-Wrestling (NJPW)'s Gabe Kidd assisted Moxley in defeating Joe. This subsequently lead to a beatdown on Joe that Kidd would join before his Opps stablemates as well as Kenny Omega and Willow Nightingale intervened. The Young Bucks and Kazuchika Okada also joined the fight and attacked the opposition, which lead into a further beatdown, before they were eventually chased out of the ring by Strickland who then challenged them to an Anarchy in the Arena match at Double or Nothing.

On the April 23 episode of Dynamite, Mark Briscoe defeated Ricochet. Over the next two weeks, both men faced each other in multi-man matches, first an eight-man tag team match, the second a trios match, both of which Ricochet won. On May 17, AEW President Tony Khan announced that Briscoe and Ricochet would face each other in a Stretcher match at Double or Nothing.

Over the course of three weeks, "Speedball" Mike Bailey faced The Young Bucks (Matthew Jackson and Nicholas Jackson) in multi-man matches, all of which The Young Bucks won. On May 22, AEW President Tony Khan announced that Bailey would face The Young Bucks' Elite stablemate Kazuchika Okada for Okada's AEW Continental Championship at Double or Nothing.

On May 22, AEW President Tony Khan announced that Paragon (Adam Cole, Roderick Strong, and Kyle O'Reilly) would face The Don Callis Family (Kyle Fletcher, Josh Alexander, and Konosuke Takeshita) at Double or Nothing.

On the May 17 at Collision: Beach Break, Megan Bayne defeated Harley Cameron. A tag team match between Bayne and Penelope Ford against Cameron and Anna Jay was then made official for the Double or Nothing Buy-In pre-show.

== Reception ==
The event received positive reviews, with the Anarchy in the Arena match and the final of the Men's Owen Hart Foundation Cup Tournament being singled out for particular acclaim. Reviewing the event for TJR Wrestling, John Canton described it as "an excellent show" and that "The match quality was strong from top to bottom, and the main event between Page/Ospreay is one of the best matches of the year from any promotion." He did, however, note that he thought the event was too long. Reviewing for 411MANIA, Thomas Hall echoed his displeasure at the length of the event, stating several matches could've been shorter, specifically noting the match between FTR and Garcia/McGuinness. However, he generally praised the event, calling the main event "outstanding" and that he enjoyed Anarchy in the Arena, though noted that "mileage may vary" depending on tastes. He gave the overall event an 8 out of 10, signifying "Very Good".

The Anarchy in the Arena match was very well received. Reviewing the event for Forbes, Alfred Konuwa called it "incredible", noting that "everyone shined" and that "it was worth the price of admission alone.", giving the match a rating of A+. Canton praised the creativity of the match and the performances of the twelve wrestlers, but noted it was hard to keep up with the action happening across the arena. Dave Meltzer, reviewing the event for the Wrestling Observer Newsletter gave the match a five star rating.

The final of the Men's Owen Hart Foundation Cop Tournament between "Hangman" Adam Page and Will Ospreay received widespread acclaim, with some calling it one of the best matches of the year. Canton praised the match as "outstanding", noting the final ten minutes as "especially impressive". He closed his review by displaying excitement for their potential rematch. Hall hailed the match as an "instant classic", calling the match an "outstanding story" between Page and Ospreay. Meltzer gave the match a score of five and a half stars, the highest of the event.

For the other matches of the event, Meltzer gave the pre-show eight-man tag team match 4.25 stars. For the main show, he gave the Women's Owen Hart Foundation Cup Tournament Women's final 4.5 stars, the FTR vs Garcia/McGuinness tag match 4.5 stars, the stretcher match 4.5 stars, the AEW World Tag Team Championship match 3.5 stars, the Continental Championship match 4.5 stars, the Women's World Championship match 4 stars, and the trios match between Paragon and The Don Callis Family 3.75 stars.

== Results ==
No.	Results	Stipulations	Times
1^{P}	Anna Jay and Harley Cameron defeated Megan Bayne and Penelope Ford by pinfall	Tag team match	12:40
2^{P}	Bandido, AR Fox, and Los Titanes del Aire (Hologram and Komander) defeated RPG Vice (Rocky Romero and Trent Beretta) and CRU (Action Andretti and Lio Rush) by pinfall	Eight-man tag team match	13:25
3	Mercedes Moné defeated Jamie Hayter by pinfall	Women's Owen Hart Foundation Tournament Final; The winner received an AEW Women's World Championship match at All In.	21:15
4	FTR (Cash Wheeler and Dax Harwood) (with Stokely) defeated Daniel Garcia and Nigel McGuinness (with Matt Menard) by technical submission	Tag team match	22:30
5	Ricochet defeated Mark Briscoe	Stretcher match	16:20
6	The Hurt Syndicate (Bobby Lashley and Shelton Benjamin) (c) (with MVP and MJF) defeated The Sons of Texas (Dustin Rhodes and Sammy Guevara) by pinfall	Tag team match for the AEW World Tag Team Championship	12:35
7	Kazuchika Okada (c) defeated "Speedball" Mike Bailey by pinfall	Singles match for the AEW Continental Championship	16:05
8	"Timeless" Toni Storm (c) (with Luther) defeated Mina Shirakawa by pinfall	Singles match for the AEW Women's World Championship	15:49
9	Kenny Omega, Swerve Strickland, Willow Nightingale, and The Opps (Samoa Joe, Powerhouse Hobbs, and Katsuyori Shibata) (with Prince Nana) defeated Death Riders (Jon Moxley, Claudio Castagnoli, Marina Shafir, and Wheeler Yuta) and The Young Bucks (Matthew Jackson and Nicholas Jackson) by pinfall	Anarchy in the Arena match	35:10
10	The Don Callis Family (Konosuke Takeshita, Kyle Fletcher, and Josh Alexander) (with Don Callis and Lance Archer) defeated Paragon (Adam Cole, Kyle O'Reilly, and Roderick Strong) by pinfall	Trios match	12:50
11	"Hangman" Adam Page defeated Will Ospreay by pinfall	Men's Owen Hart Foundation Tournament Final; The winner received an AEW World Championship match at All In.	36:56
(c) / – the champion(s) heading into the match; P / – the match was broadcast on the pre-show

=== Owen Hart Cup brackets ===
==== Women's ====
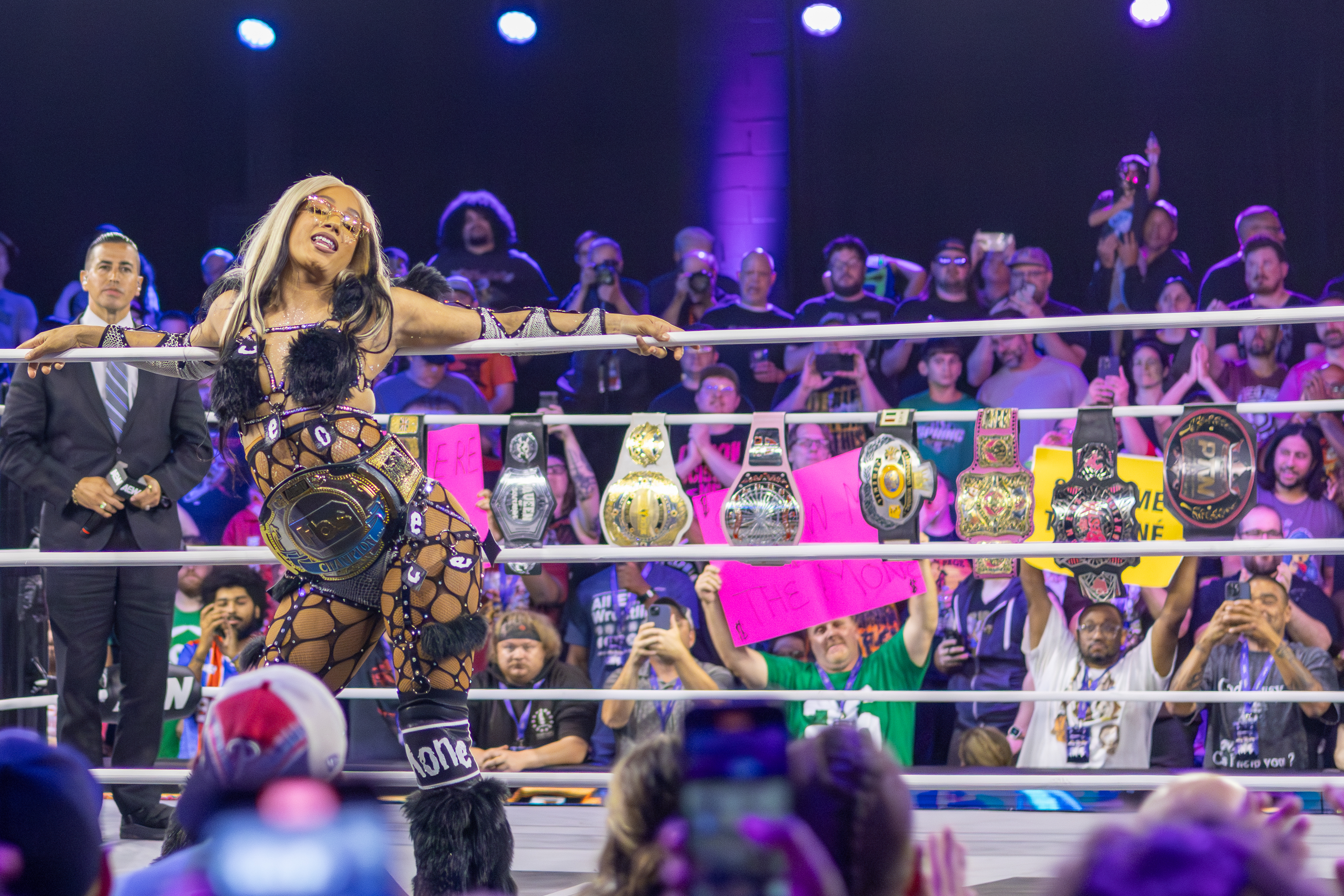
2025 Women's Tournament winner Mercedes Moné showcasing her titles, with the tournament belt displayed third to the right.

Quarterfinals; Dynasty (April 6, 2025); Dynamite (April 9, 2025); Collision (April 12, 2025)
Jamie Hayter	Pin
Billie Starkz	13:55
Thunder Rosa	9:40
Kris Statlander	Pin
Julia Hart	13:00
Mercedes Moné	Pin
Harley Cameron	10:30
Athena	Pin

Semifinals; Dynamite: Spring BreakThru (April 16, 2025); Dynamite (April 23, 2025)
Jamie Hayter	Pin
Kris Statlander	12:10
Mercedes Moné	Pin
Athena	21:10

Final; Double or Nothing (May 25, 2025)
Jamie Hayter	21:15
Mercedes Moné	Pin

==== Men's ====
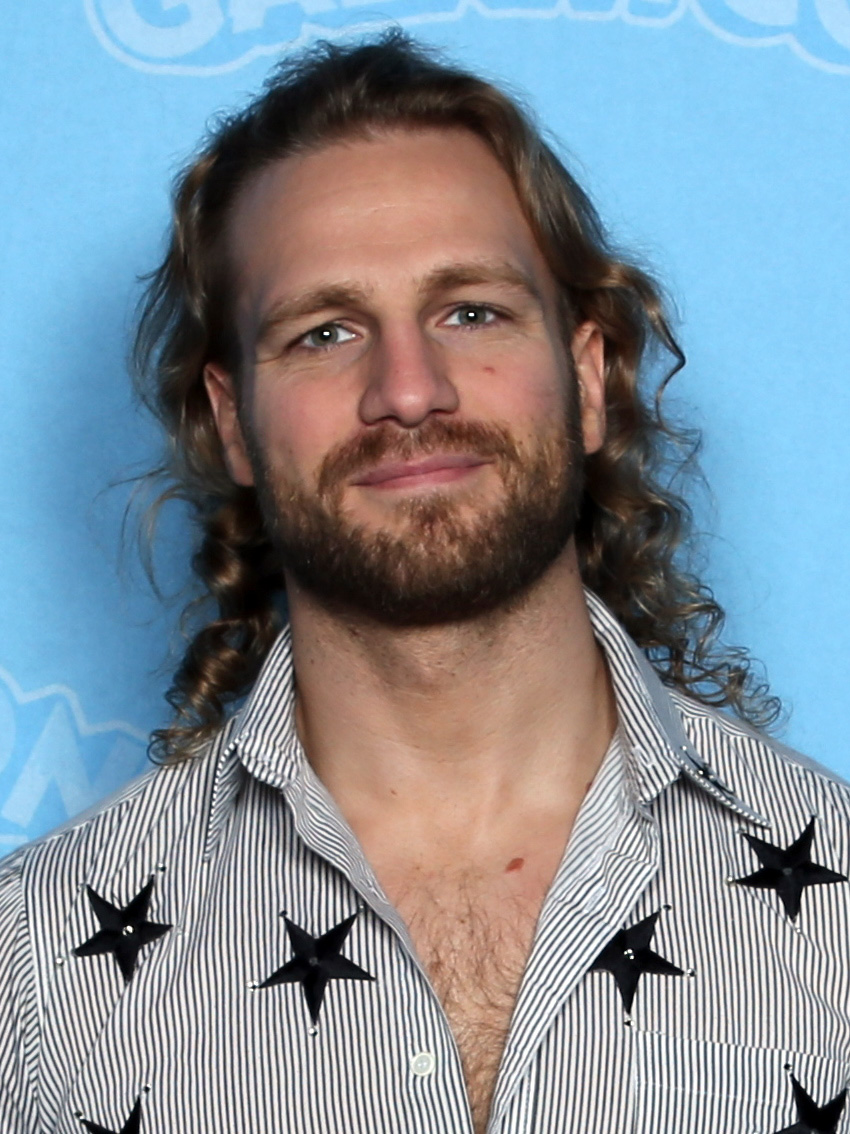
2025 Men's Tournament winner "Hangman" Adam Page

Quarterfinals; Dynasty (April 6, 2025); Collision (April 12, 2025); Dynamite: Spring BreakThru (April 16, 2025)
Will Ospreay	Pin
Kevin Knight (Note: Jay White was originally scheduled to face Will Ospreay, but was removed from the match due to injury. Knight was announced as his replacement.)	13:50
Brody King	12:20
Konosuke Takeshita	Pin
Mark Briscoe	16:15
Kyle Fletcher	Pin
"Hangman" Adam Page	Pin
Josh Alexander	13:05

Semifinals; Dynamite: Spring BreakThru (April 16, 2025); Dynamite (April 30, 2025)
Will Ospreay	Pin
Konosuke Takeshita	21:45
Kyle Fletcher	23:25
"Hangman" Adam Page	Pin

Final; Double or Nothing (May 25, 2025)
Will Ospreay	36:55
"Hangman" Adam Page	Pin
