= Beach Break (2022) =

All Elite Wrestling two-part television special

- Promotional poster featuring various AEW wrestlers
- Promotion: All Elite Wrestling
- Date: January 26, 2022 (aired January 26 and 28, 2022)
- City: Cleveland, Ohio
- Venue: Wolstein Center
- Attendance: 6,100

Beach Break chronology
← Previous; 2021	Next → 2024

AEW Dynamite special episodes chronology
← Previous; New Year's Smash	Next → St. Patrick's Day Slam

AEW Rampage special episodes chronology
← Previous; New Year's Smash	Next → Slam Dunk

The 2022 Beach Break was a two-part professional wrestling television special produced by All Elite Wrestling (AEW). It was the second annual Beach Break and took place on January 26, 2022, at Wolstein Center in Cleveland, Ohio. The two-part event was broadcast as special episodes of AEW's weekly television programs, Wednesday Night Dynamite and Friday Night Rampage. Dynamite aired live on TBS while Rampage aired on tape delay on TNT on January 28. A Beach Break special was not held in 2023 but returned in July 2024.

In the main event of the Dynamite broadcast, Orange Cassidy defeated Adam Cole in a Lights Out match, which also saw the AEW debut of Danhausen. The opening bout was a ladder match for the AEW TNT Championship, in which interim champion Sammy Guevara defeated lineal champion Cody Rhodes to become the undisputed TNT Champion in what was Rhodes' final match in AEW. In the main event of the Rampage broadcast, Jurassic Express (Jungle Boy and Luchasaurus) defeated Private Party (Marq Quen and Isiah Kassidy) to retain the AEW World Tag Team Championship.

== Production ==
=== Background ===
In February 2021, All Elite Wrestling (AEW) held a television special titled Beach Break, which aired as a special episode of Dynamite. The event replaced Bash at the Beach as the promotion's midwinter beach-themed event. A second Beach Break was scheduled for late January 2022 to air as a two-part event as special episodes of Dynamite and Rampage, thus establishing Beach Break as an annual event. It was scheduled to be held on January 26, 2022, at the Wolstein Center in Cleveland, Ohio. Dynamite aired live on TBS while Rampage aired on tape delay on TNT on January 28.

=== Storylines ===
Beach Break featured professional wrestling matches that involved different wrestlers from pre-existing scripted feuds and storylines. Wrestlers portrayed heroes, villains, or less distinguishable characters in scripted events that built tension and culminated in a wrestling match or series of matches. Storylines were produced on AEW's weekly television programs, Dynamite and Rampage, the supplementary online streaming shows, Dark and Elevation, and The Young Bucks' YouTube series Being The Elite.

During the special Holiday Bash episode of Rampage on December 25, 2021, Cody Rhodes defeated Sammy Guevara to become a record three-time AEW TNT Champion. The two were scheduled to have a rematch for the championship at Battle of the Belts I on January 8, 2022; however, Cody was pulled from the event as he had been in contact with family who had tested positive for COVID-19, thus requiring him to quarantine. Guevara instead faced and defeated Cody's brother Dustin Rhodes at that event to become the interim champion. On the January 19 episode of Dynamite, lineal champion Cody challenged interim champion Guevara to a ladder match at the Dynamite broadcast of Beach Break to determine the undisputed TNT Champion.

== Results ==
Dynamite - Beach Break (January 26)
No.	Results	Stipulations	Times
1	Sammy Guevara (interim champion) defeated Cody Rhodes (lineal champion) (with Arn Anderson) by retrieving both title belts	Ladder match to determine the undisputed AEW TNT Champion	22:59
2	Wardlow (with Shawn Spears) defeated Elijah Dean and James Alexander by pinfall	Handicap match	1:23
3	The Inner Circle (Chris Jericho, Ortiz and Santana) defeated Daniel Garcia and 2.0 (Jeff Parker and Matt Lee) by pinfall	Six man tag team match	8:52
4	Leyla Hirsch defeated Red Velvet by pinfall	Singles match	8:08
5	Orange Cassidy defeated Adam Cole by pinfall	Unsanctioned Lights Out match	16:56

Rampage - Beach Break Championship Friday (January 28)
No.	Results	Stipulations	Times
1	Jon Moxley defeated Anthony Bowens (with Max Caster) by pinfall	Singles match	12:02
2	FTR (Cash Wheeler and Dax Harwood) (with Tully Blanchard) defeated The Nightmare Family (Brock Anderson and Lee Johnson) (with Arn Anderson) by pinfall	Tag team match	9:10
3	Jade Cargill (with Mark Sterling) (c) defeated Julia Hart (with Griff Garrison) by pinfall	Singles match for the AEW TBS Championship	2:28
4	Jungle Boy and Luchasaurus (c) (with Christian Cage) defeated Private Party (Isiah Kassidy and Marq Quen) (with Matt Hardy and The Blade) by pinfall	Tag team match for the AEW World Tag Team Championship	10:45
(c) / – the champion(s) heading into the match

== Reception ==
Dave Meltzer of the Wrestling Observer Newsletter gave the ladder match between Cody Rhodes and Sammy Guevara a 5 star rating.

=== Television ratings ===
Dynamite averaged 1,100,000 television viewers on TBS, with a 0.41 rating in the key demographic.

Rampage averaged 601,000 television viewers on TNT, with a 0.25 rating in the key demographic.
