= AEW Revolution (2020) =

All Elite Wrestling pay-per-view event

Revolution
- Promotional poster featuring various AEW wrestlers
- Promotion: All Elite Wrestling
- Date: February 29, 2020
- City: Chicago, Illinois
- Venue: Wintrust Arena
- Attendance: 7,000
- Buy rate: 100,000–105,000
- Tagline: Join The Revolution

Pay-per-view chronology
← Previous; Full Gear	Next → Double or Nothing

Revolution chronology
← Previous; First	Next → 2021

The 2020 Revolution was the inaugural Revolution professional wrestling pay-per-view (PPV) event produced by All Elite Wrestling (AEW). It took place on February 29, 2020, at the Wintrust Arena in Chicago, Illinois. The event was AEW's last PPV to be held before the COVID-19 pandemic took effect in mid-March, and AEW's final PPV event to be held with a full capacity crowd until Double or Nothing in May 2021. The event aired through traditional PPV outlets, as well as on B/R Live in North America and FITE TV internationally.

Nine matches were contested at the event, including one on The Buy In pre-show and one dark match. In the main event, Jon Moxley defeated Chris Jericho to win the AEW World Championship. In other prominent matches, Kenny Omega and Adam Page defeated The Young Bucks (Matt and Nick Jackson) to retain the AEW World Tag Team Championship, Nyla Rose defeated Kris Statlander to retain the AEW Women's World Championship, MJF defeated Cody, and Jake Hager defeated Dustin Rhodes in Hager's AEW in-ring debut.

== Production ==
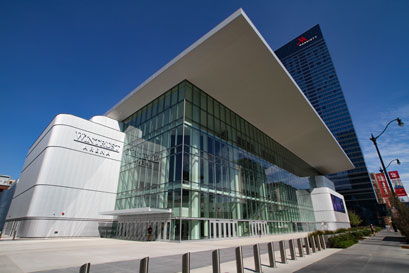
The inaugural Revolution was held at the Wintrust Arena in Chicago, Illinois.

=== Background ===
On August 2, 2019, the American professional wrestling promotion All Elite Wrestling (AEW) filed two trademarks for "AEW Revolution" along with the logo on November 21. On December 3, AEW filed a trademark for "Join The Revolution" along with the logo on December 6.

On December 9, 2019, AEW announced that they were returning to the Chicago Comic & Entertainment Expo (C2E2), taking place from February 28 to March 1, 2020. During the December 11 episode of Dynamite, it was announced that their next pay-per-view (PPV) event would be Revolution, held at the Wintrust Arena in Chicago, Illinois on Saturday, February 29, and would be in partnership with C2E2. Tickets for the event sold out in less than an hour.

On February 26, 2020, immediately following Dynamite, TNT aired a one-hour television special called Countdown to Revolution which averaged 383,000 viewers. A remix with Mikey Rukus to "Revelation" by Zardonic was the official theme song for the event.

=== Storylines ===
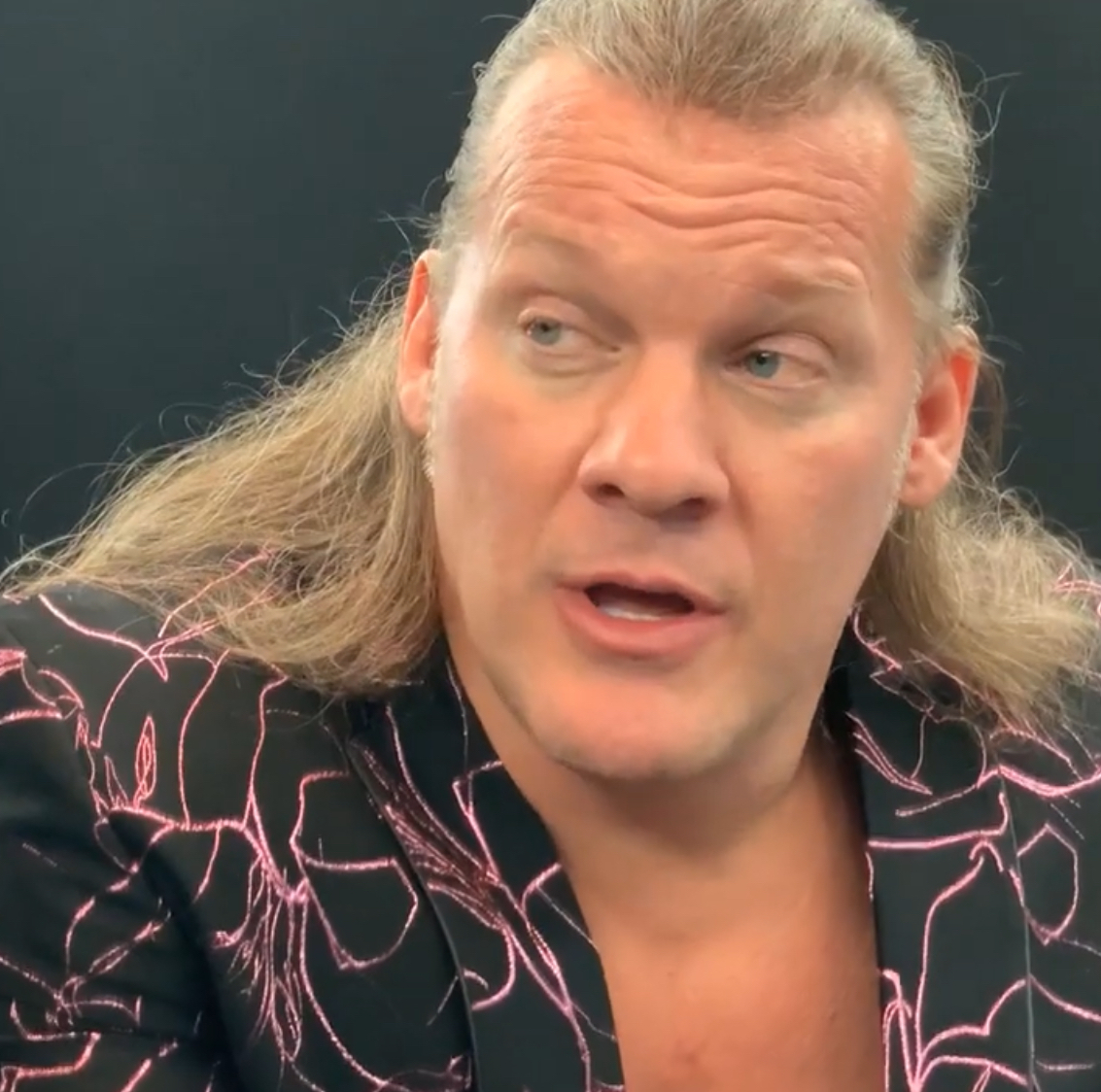
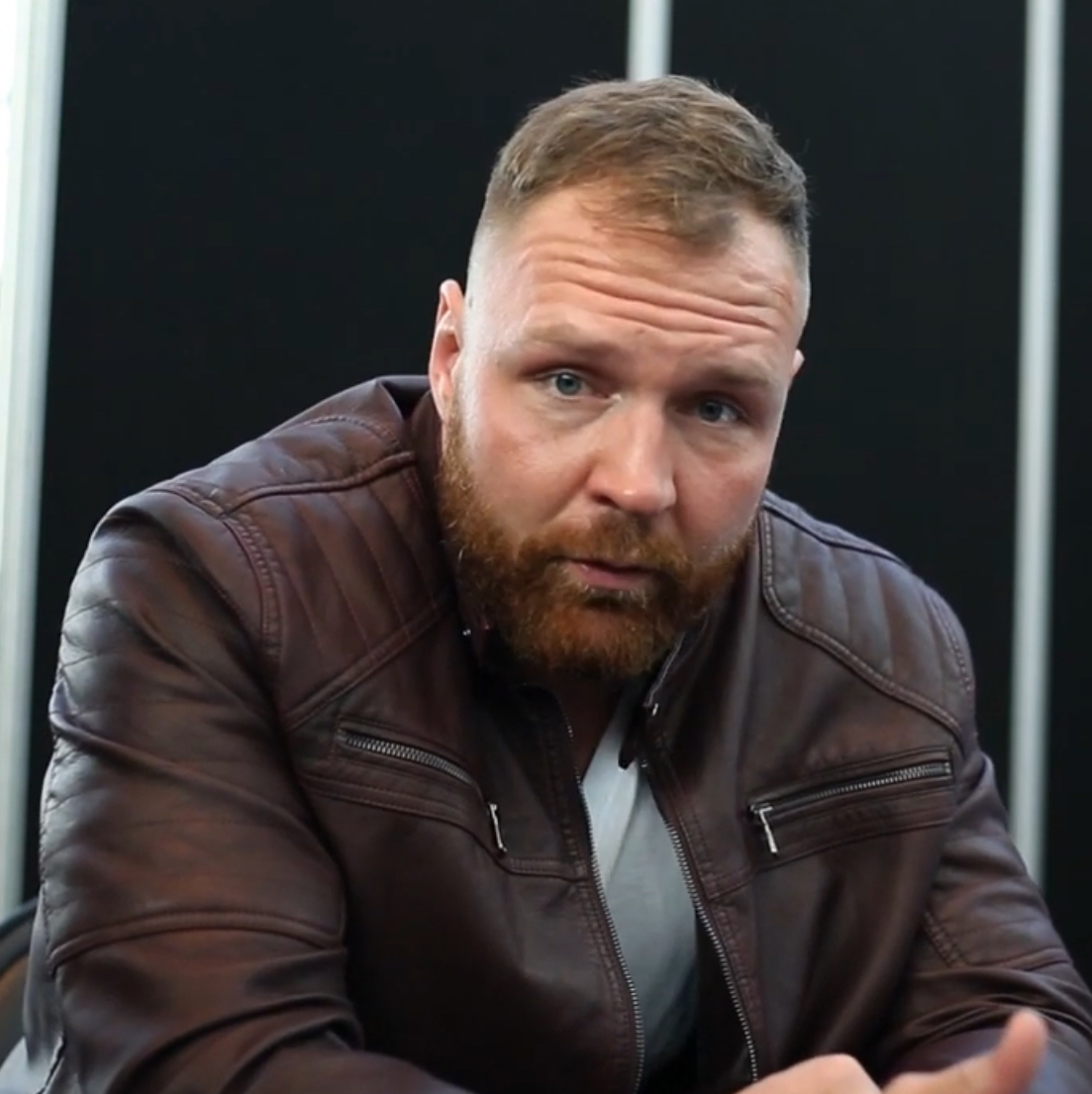
The primary feud heading into Revolution was between Chris Jericho and Jon Moxley over the AEW World Championship

Revolution featured professional wrestling matches that involved different wrestlers from pre-existing scripted feuds and storylines. Wrestlers portrayed heroes, villains, or less distinguishable characters in scripted events that built tension and culminated in a wrestling match or series of matches. Storylines were produced on AEW's weekly television program, Dynamite, the supplementary online streaming show, Dark, and The Young Bucks' YouTube series Being The Elite.

After Jon Moxley's victory over Kenny Omega at Full Gear, he turned his attention to the AEW World Championship. On the December 11, 2019, episode of Dynamite, AEW World Champion Chris Jericho invited Moxley to join his faction The Inner Circle. He offered him 49% ownership of The Inner Circle LLC, Executive Vice President position of The Inner Circle, and a Ford GT with a "MOX" vanity plate. After considering his offer for several weeks, Moxley finally agreed to join the group on the January 8, 2020 episode, even removing his jacket which revealed an Inner Circle shirt. However, this was later revealed to be a ruse as Moxley subsequently attacked Jericho and stablemate Sammy Guevara. At Bash at the Beach on January 15, after Moxley defeated Guevara, Guevara and his Inner Circle stablemates Jericho, Jake Hager, and Santana and Ortiz attacked Moxley. Jericho removed a metal spike from his jacket and hit Moxley in the right eye with it, resulting in Moxley needing to wear an eyepatch and leading to an Eye for an Eye match. Moxley then defeated Pac on the January 22 episode of Dynamite to become the number one contender for Jericho's championship at Revolution.

At the start of AEW's foundation, Cody took on MJF as his protégé, who often accompanied Cody for matches. At Full Gear on November 9, 2019, Cody faced Chris Jericho for the AEW World Championship with a stipulation that if Cody lost, he could never challenge for the title again. While Jericho had Cody in the Liontamer submission hold, Cody's cornerman MJF threw in the towel as he felt that Cody could not continue, thus Jericho retained, ending any future world championship pursuits for Cody. After the match, MJF consoled a disappointed Cody, but then turned on him by performing a low blow. On the following episode of Dynamite, MJF called Cody a liar and a sociopath and claimed that if he had not prevented Cody from winning, his career would have been over. Cody came to the ring, but was attacked by the debuting Wardlow, revealed to be MJF's bodyguard. As MJF refused to face Cody in a match, Cody asked MJF to name his price. MJF laid out three conditions to be met by Cody in order for a match between them to happen at Revolution: he could not touch MJF until the match, he would have to face Wardlow in a steel cage match, and he would have to take ten lashes with a leather belt on live TV. Cody agreed to all the stipulations. On the February 5, 2020 episode, Cody took the ten lashes from MJF, including one from Wardlow. Angered that Cody prevailed, MJF hit a low blow on Cody and quickly retreated with Wardlow. Cody then defeated Wardlow in AEW's first steel cage match on the February 19 episode to make the match with MJF at Revolution official. After Cody's moonsault from the top of the steel cage, it was revealed he suffered a non-displaced fracture of the distal phalanx bone in his right great toe, but was cleared to compete.

On the debut episode of Dynamite on October 2, 2019, Jake Hager made his AEW debut by attacking Dustin Rhodes, Cody, and The Young Bucks (Matt Jackson and Nick Jackson). He also gave Dustin Rhodes a gutwrench powerbomb through a table, aligning himself with Chris Jericho, Sammy Guevara, Santana, and Ortiz, who would all become known as The Inner Circle. On the October 30 episode, Hager attacked Rhodes in a parking lot and slammed his arm in a car door, injuring his arm. On the February 12, 2020 episode, after Rhodes' victory over Guevara, he insulted Hager for being a "failure" in both professional wrestling and mixed martial arts, proclaiming that he wanted a match with him at Revolution, which Hager accepted, marking Hager's AEW in-ring debut.

On the February 19 episode of Dynamite, The Young Bucks (Matt and Nick Jackson) won a 10-team tag team battle royal to become the number one contenders for the AEW World Tag Team Championship at Revolution. Other teams in the battle royal were Best Friends (Chuck Taylor and Trent), The Butcher and The Blade, The Dark Order (Alex Reynolds and John Silver), The Hybrid 2 (Angelico and Jack Evans), The Inner Circle (Santana and Ortiz), Jurassic Express (Jungle Boy and Luchasaurus), Private Party (Isiah Kassidy and Marq Quen), SoCal Uncensored (Frankie Kazarian and Scorpio Sky), and Strong Hearts (Cima and T-Hawk). That same episode, champions Kenny Omega and Adam Page successfully defended their title against Lucha Brothers (Pentagon Jr. and Rey Fenix), pitting The Elite against one another at Revolution.

On the January 29 episode of Dynamite, Darby Allin teamed with Private Party (Isiah Kassidy and Marq Quen) in a losing effort against The Inner Circle (Chris Jericho, Santana, and Ortiz). After the match, The Inner Circle attacked Private Party and Allin. Sammy Guevara took Allin's own skateboard, ramming him throat-first into the ring with the edge of the skateboard. Allin made his return on the February 19 episode and went after Guevara, who, along with his Inner Circle stablemates, were beating down Jon Moxley and Dustin Rhodes. During AEW's "Road to Kansas City" video released via YouTube on February 24, a match was announced between Guevara and Allin for Revolution.

On the February 12 episode of Dynamite, Nyla Rose defeated Riho to win the AEW Women's World Championship. The following week, Kris Statlander interrupted Rose's interview and pointed at the championship belt. On February 24, AEW announced that Rose would have her first title defense against Statlander at Revolution.

During Pac's match against Trent on the November 6, 2019 episode of Dynamite, Chuck Taylor distracted the referee while Orange Cassidy rolled into the ring and hit Pac with a series of kicks. Pac responded with a Pump Kick to Cassidy's head. On the December 17 episode of Dark, Cassidy teamed with Best Friends (Taylor and Trent) in a losing effort against Pac and The Hybrid 2 (Angelico and Jack Evans). Cassidy again delivered a series of kicks to Pac and as Pac attempted another Pump Kick, Cassidy ducked and countered with a tornado DDT. On the February 26, 2020 episode of Dynamite, Cassidy interrupted Pac's post-match interview after Pac's loss to Kenny Omega in an Iron Man match, resulting in Pac attacking Cassidy. Later in the episode, a match between the two was confirmed for Revolution, marking Cassidy's first singles match in AEW.

On the January 8 episode of Dynamite, after Christopher Daniels lost to Sammy Guevara, The Dark Order came down to the ring in an attempt to recruit Daniels. Evil Uno told Daniels to "Stop losing and start winning" and offered Daniels a Dark Order mask. Daniels declined and was beaten down by Stu Grayson, Alex Reynolds, and John Silver. On the February 26 episode, a match between The Dark Order (Evil Uno and Stu Grayson) and SoCal Uncensored (Frankie Kazarian and Scorpio Sky) was arranged for Revolution.

== Event ==
Other on-screen personnel
Role	Name
Commentators	Jim Ross (PPV)
Commentators	Excalibur (Pre-show + PPV)
Commentators	Tony Schiavone (PPV)
Commentators	Taz (Pre-show)
Spanish commentators	Alex Abrahantes
Spanish commentators	Dasha Gonzalez
Spanish commentators	Willie Urbina
German commentators	Günter Zapf
German commentators	Mike Ritter
Ring announcer	Justin Roberts
Referees	Aubrey Edwards
Referees	Bryce Remsburg
Referees	Paul Turner
Referees	Rick Knox
Interviewers	Lexy Nair
Interviewers	Tony Schiavone

=== Dark match ===
Prior to the televised portion of the event, Dr. Britt Baker, D.M.D. and Penelope Ford (accompanied by Kip Sabian) defeated Riho and Yuka Sakazaki in a tag team match taped for a future episode of AEW Dark.

=== The Buy In ===
During The Buy In pre-show, The Dark Order (Evil Uno and Stu Grayson, accompanied by Alex Reynolds and John Silver and several masked "creepers") defeated SoCal Uncensored (Frankie Kazarian and Scorpio Sky) when Grayson rolled up Sky using the tights as leverage after Uno performed a running elbow strike to the latter. After the match, Colt Cabana, making his AEW debut, came to the ring to attack The Dark Order, but was quickly ambushed by the group members and thrown out of the ring. Shortly afterwards, SoCal Uncensored teammate Christopher Daniels emerged in a cloak and helped Kazarian and Sky clear The Dark Order from the ring.

=== Preliminary matches ===
The main card began with a match between Dustin Rhodes and Jake Hager. This was Hager's AEW debut match. In the end, Hager performed a "Low Blow" to Rhodes while the referee Aubrey Edwards was distracted and applied a "Arm Triangle Choke" submission hold, forcing Rhodes to submit for the victory.

In the following match, Darby Allin took on Sammy Guevara. In the match's climax, Guevara removed a pad from the ring turnbuckle and attempted to slam Allin into it, before Allin reversed and sent Guevara's face into the exposed turnbuckle. He then climbed the top rope and performed a "Coffin Drop" for the win.

In the third match, Kenny Omega and Adam Page defended the AEW World Tag Team Championship against The Young Bucks (Matt Jackson and Nick Jackson). After a back-and-forth match, Page performed the "Buckshot Lariat" on Nick Jackson at the outside area to incapacitate him, before performing another "Buckshot Lariat" on Matt Jackson in the ring to win and retain the championship.

Afterwards, Nyla Rose defended the AEW Women's World Championship against Kris Statlander. During the match's conclusion, Rose performed a "Superplex" on Statlander before performing a "Powerbomb" from the top rope to win the match and retain the championship.

Next, Cody (accompanied by Arn Anderson and Brandi Rhodes) faced MJF (accompanied by Wardlow) in a grudge match. At one point during the match, Cody performed a "Disaster Kick" on MJF that caused him to bleed from the head. Eventually, Cody performed two "Cross Rhodes" on MJF and was preparing to perform a third, but before he could, MJF hit Cody in the face with his Dynamite Diamond Ring and pinned him for the victory.

The penultimate match pitted Orange Cassidy (accompanied by Chuck Taylor and Trent) against Pac. In the climax, the Lucha Brothers (Pentagón Jr. and Rey Fénix) came down and attacked Taylor and Trent, distracting Cassidy long enough for Pac to perform the "Brutalizer" submission hold, leading to Cassidy submitting and giving Pac the win.

=== Main event ===
In the main event, Chris Jericho (accompanied by Santana and Ortiz) defended the AEW World Championship against Jon Moxley. After repeated interferences from Santana, Ortiz and Inner Circle teammate Jake Hager, all three men were ejected by the referee. However, as the referee was distracted, Inner Circle member Sammy Guevara ran down and hit Moxley with the AEW title belt and Jericho covered Moxley for a near-fall. In the end, Moxley removed his eyepatch that he was wearing due to an earlier attack from Jericho, revealing he could see clearly, and performed a "Paradigm Shift" DDT on Jericho to win the match and championship.

== Reception ==
The event was critically acclaimed, with the AEW World Tag Team Championship Match receiving overwhelming universal praise from both critics and fans, with some deeming it "one of the greatest tag matches of all time". Brent Brookhouse of CBS Sports graded the main event "B+" and wrote that Jon Moxley's AEW World Championship victory was an "iconic moment". Elsewhere on the card, the Page and Omega-Young Bucks was given a perfect score of "A+" and was described as "arguably the best match in AEW's short history", both Pac-Orange Cassidy and MJF-Cody were given a "B+" grade, the women's championship match between Nyla Rose and Kris Statlander received a "D" rating (the lowest of the card) and Hager-Rhodes was designated a "C+". John Powell, writing for Canadian Online Explorer's Slam! Sports section, gave the event a total rating of 9 out of 10, with the main event and tag team championship also both receiving a 9 out of 10 rating. MJF-Cody received an 8.5 out of 10, Rose-Statlander was given 6 out of 10 and Hager-Rhodes was rated 7.5 out of 10.

Dave Meltzer of the Wrestling Observer Newsletter awarded the tag team championship match 6 stars, which is AEW's highest-rated tag team match in the history of professional wrestling, with Meltzer describing it as "the greatest tag team match in history". The tag team match also won the Wrestling Observer Newsletter Pro Wrestling Match of the Year, Pro Wrestling Illustrated Match of the Year and Voices of Wrestling Match of the Year awards. The event was voted Best Major Wrestling Show of 2020.

== Aftermath ==
On the March 4 episode of Dynamite, Jon Moxley teamed with Darby Allin to face Chris Jericho and Sammy Guevara. However, The Inner Circle attacked Moxley before the match, making the match a 2-on-1 handicap match, which Jericho and Guevara won.

On that same episode of Dynamite, Pac defeated Chuck Taylor in a singles match and was joined by the Lucha Brothers in attacking Taylor, Trent and Orange Cassidy after the match. Pac then proclaimed that they were forming a new stable called "Death Triangle".

Also on that episode, Cody addressed his loss against MJF, but he was interrupted by Jake Roberts, who claimed that he had a client who will "slay" Cody and bring "the dark side" to AEW.

Additionally on the March 4 episode of Dynamite, SoCal Uncensored teamed with Colt Cabana to defeat The Dark Order.

Due to the COVID-19 pandemic that began affecting the industry in mid-March, AEW moved its weekly programs to their home venue of Daily's Place in Jacksonville, Florida. The events were held behind closed doors with no outside spectators; instead, AEW used non-competing wrestlers and crew to serve as the live audience. In late August, AEW began to readmit a limited number of fans (10–15% venue capacity), before running full capacity shows in May 2021. AEW then resumed live touring in July.

In November 2020, AEW President and CEO Tony Khan referred to Revolution as being one of AEW's "Big Four" PPVs, which includes Double or Nothing, All Out, and Full Gear, their four biggest domestic shows produced quarterly. The inaugural Revolution was the fourth of these shows produced.

== Results ==
No.	Results	Stipulations	Times
1^{AD}	Dr. Britt Baker, D.M.D. and Penelope Ford (with Kip Sabian) defeated Riho and Yuka Sakazaki by submission	Tag team match	8:10
2^{P}	The Dark Order (Evil Uno and Stu Grayson) (with Alex Reynolds and John Silver) defeated SoCal Uncensored (Frankie Kazarian and Scorpio Sky)	Tag team match	9:25
3	Jake Hager defeated Dustin Rhodes by submission	Singles match	14:40
4	Darby Allin defeated Sammy Guevara	Singles match	5:00
5	Kenny Omega and "Hangman" Adam Page (c) defeated The Young Bucks (Matt and Nick Jackson)	Tag team match for the AEW World Tag Team Championship	30:05
6	Nyla Rose (c) defeated Kris Statlander	Singles match for the AEW Women's World Championship	12:45
7	MJF (with Wardlow) defeated Cody (with Arn Anderson and Brandi Rhodes)	Singles match	24:40
8	Pac defeated Orange Cassidy (with Chuck Taylor and Trent) by submission	Singles match	13:00
9	Jon Moxley defeated Chris Jericho (c) (with Santana and Ortiz)	Singles match for the AEW World Championship	22:20
(c) / – the champion(s) heading into the match; AD / – the match was taped for a future broadcast of Dark; P / – the match was broadcast on the pre-show

=== AEW World Championship #1 Contender Tournament ===
Semifinals; AEW Bash at the Beach (January 15)
4	Pac	Pin
Darby Allin	11:42
5	Sammy Guevara	10:02
1	Jon Moxley	Sub

Final; Chris Jericho's Rock 'N' Wrestling Rager at Sea (January 22); Taped January 21
2	Pac	17:20
1	Jon Moxley	Pin

== See also ==
- 2020 in professional wrestling
- List of All Elite Wrestling pay-per-view events
