= Beach Break (2026) =

All Elite Wrestling television special

- Promotion: All Elite Wrestling
- Date: July 8, 2026
- City: Clearwater Beach, Florida
- Venue: BayCare Sound
- Attendance: 3,419

Beach Break chronology
← Previous; 2025	Next → —

AEW Dynamite special episodes chronology
← Previous; Summer Blockbuster	Next → Grand Slam Mexico

The 2026 Beach Break was a professional wrestling television special produced by All Elite Wrestling (AEW). It was the fifth Beach Break event and took place on July 8, 2026, at the BayCare Sound in Clearwater Beach, Florida. It was broadcast as a special episode of AEW's weekly television program, Wednesday Night Dynamite, airing live on TBS and HBO Max in the United States. While the previous year's event aired as a two-part special across Dynamite and Collision, the 2026 event was the first Beach Break since the inaugural event in 2021 to air across only one night.

The event was notable for the return of Willow Nightingale after two months away due to injury.

== Production ==
=== Background ===
Beach Break is a recurring professional wrestling television special produced by All Elite Wrestling (AEW) since 2021, airing as special episodes of AEW's weekly television programs. It was originally a one-night special but expanded to two nights in 2022. An event was not held in 2023 but returned in 2024. On May 18, 2026, AEW announced that the fifth Beach Break would take place on July 8, 2026, emanating from the BayCare Sound in Clearwater Beach, Florida and simulcast on HBO Max. However, while the previous year's Beach Break had taken place across both Dynamite and Collision, the 2026 event was only announced as a special episode of Dynamite, making it the first Beach Break since 2021 to take place across only one night.

=== Storylines ===
Beach Break featured professional wrestling matches that involved different wrestlers from pre-existing scripted feuds and storylines. Storylines were produced on AEW's weekly television programs, Dynamite and Collision.

== Results ==
No.	Results	Stipulations	Times
1^{D}	Místico, Brody King, and "Speedball" Mike Bailey defeated Chico Adams, Dante Casanova, and Main Man Oro by pinfall	Trios match	—
2^{D}	Steven Borden and Kiran Grey defeated The Lethal Twist (Blake Christian and Jay Lethal) by pinfall	Tag team match	—
3^{D}	Brian Cage defeated Rhys Maddox by pinfall	Singles match	—
4	Tommaso Ciampa defeated Jericho by pinfall	Singles match	13:50
5	Kyle Fletcher (with Don Callis) defeated Konosuke Takeshita (c) by pinfall	Singles match for the AEW International Championship	16:55
6	Death Riders (Jon Moxley and Will Ospreay) (with Marina Shafir) defeated The WorkHorsemen (Anthony Henry and JD Drake) by pinfall	Tag team match	8:37
7	Willow Nightingale won by pinning Julia Hart (Note: Order of entrants: Athena, Maya World, Skye Blue, Mina Shirakawa, Rina, Julia Hart, Thunder Rosa, and Willow Nightingale.)	Women's Casino Gauntlet match for an AEW Women's World Championship match at AEW Redemption	18:25
8	Kenny Omega defeated MJF (c) by pinfall	Last Chance match for the AEW World Championship; Had Omega lost, he would have never been able to challenge for the AEW World Championship ever again.	24:12
(c) / – the champion(s) heading into the match; D / – this was a dark match
