= AEW Beach Break =

All Elite Wrestling television special series

- AEW Beach Break logo
- Promotions: All Elite Wrestling
- First event: 2021

AEW Beach Break is a recurring professional wrestling television special produced by the American promotion All Elite Wrestling (AEW). Established in 2021, it is named after one of AEW wrestler Orange Cassidy's finishing moves, the Beach Break. The event originally replaced Bash at the Beach as the promotion's beach-themed show held in midwinter; however, an event was not held in 2023, but returned in July 2024 with the following year's held in May.

The inaugural event aired as a special episode of the promotion's flagship weekly television program, Wednesday Night Dynamite. In 2022, it was expanded to a two-part event, with the second part airing as a special episode of Friday Night Rampage. It retained this format for its return in 2024, but with Rampage's cancellation later that year, the second part of the 2025 event aired as a special episode of Saturday Night Collision.

== History ==
On March 18, 2019, Cody Rhodes, who became a wrestler and an executive vice president of All Elite Wrestling (AEW), filed to trademark several World Championship Wrestling (WCW) event names that WWE (the owner of WCW's intellectual property) had let expire, including Bash at the Beach, on the basis that Dusty Rhodes, his father, created them. Accordingly, AEW held two Bash at the Beach events in 2020. In November of that year, however, a settlement was reached between Cody Rhodes and WWE in which Cody gained the "Cody Rhodes" trademark, which WWE had held onto after his run in that company, in exchange for WWE gaining the WCW event name trademarks that Cody had claimed, including Bash at the Beach.

Two weeks after the trademark settlement was announced, AEW replaced Bash at the Beach with an event called Beach Break, named after one of AEW wrestler Orange Cassidy's finishing moves, the Beach Break. It was announced to be held as a special episode of Dynamite in January 2021. However, the event was later rescheduled to February 3. Due to the ongoing COVID-19 pandemic, the event was held at Daily's Place in Jacksonville, Florida.

On the January 5, 2022, episode of Dynamite, it was announced that a second Beach Break would take place as a two-part event at the Wolstein Center in Cleveland, Ohio on January 26. The first part aired live as Dynamite while the second part aired on tape delay as the January 28 episode of Rampage. The 2022 event would also feature Rhodes's final match in AEW. This had also established Beach Break as an annual television special for AEW held in midwinter; however, an event was not held in 2023.

During the June 26, 2024, episode of Dynamite, Beach Break was announced to return as special episodes of the following week's Dynamite and Rampage on July 3, 2024, with Rampage airing on tape delay on July 5, both as part of a cross-promotion with Shark Week. It was scheduled to be held at the Wintrust Arena in Chicago, Illinois.

On April 22, 2025, AEW announced that the fourth Beach Break would take place on May 14, 2025, emanating from the Now Arena in Hoffman Estates, Illinois. It was also scheduled as a two-part event. Due to Rampage's cancellation at the end of 2024, the first part aired live as Dynamite with the second part airing on tape delay as Saturday Night Collision on May 17.

== Events ==
#	Event	Date	City	Venue	Main event	Ref.
1	Beach Break (2021)	Dynamite; February 3, 2021	Jacksonville, Florida	Daily's Place	Kenny Omega and The Good Brothers (Doc Gallows and Karl Anderson) vs. Jon Moxley and Death Triangle (Pac and Rey Fénix)	
2	Beach Break (2022)	Night 1: Dynamite; January 26, 2022	Cleveland, Ohio	Wolstein Center	Adam Cole vs. Orange Cassidy in a Lights Out match	
2	Beach Break (2022)	Night 2: Rampage; January 26, 2022 (aired January 28)	Cleveland, Ohio	Wolstein Center	Jurassic Express (Jungle Boy and Luchasaurus) (c) vs. Private Party (Marq Quen and Isiah Kassidy) for the AEW World Tag Team Championship	
3	Beach Break (2024)	Night 1: Dynamite; July 3, 2024	Chicago, Illinois	Wintrust Arena	Will Ospreay (c) vs. Daniel Garcia for the AEW International Championship	
3	Beach Break (2024)	Night 2: Rampage; July 3, 2024 (aired July 5)	Chicago, Illinois	Wintrust Arena	Mariah May vs. Hikaru Shida in an Women's Owen Hart Foundation Tournament semifinal match	
4	Beach Break (2025)	Night 1: Dynamite; May 14, 2025	Hoffman Estates, Illinois	Now Arena	Jon Moxley (c) vs. Samoa Joe in a Steel Cage match for the AEW World Championship	
4	Beach Break (2025)	Night 2: Collision; May 14, 2025 (aired May 17)	Hoffman Estates, Illinois	Now Arena	Powerhouse Hobbs vs. Wheeler Yuta	
5	Beach Break (2026)	Dynamite; July 8, 2026	Clearwater Beach, Florida	The BayCare Sound	MJF (c) vs. Kenny Omega in a Last Chance match for the AEW World Championship; Had Omega lost, he would have never been able to challenge for the AEW World Championship again.	
(c) – refers to the champion(s) heading into the match

== See also ==
- List of All Elite Wrestling special events
- List of AEW Dynamite special episodes
- List of AEW Rampage special episodes
