= MGM Music Hall at Fenway =

Music venue in Boston, Massachusetts, US

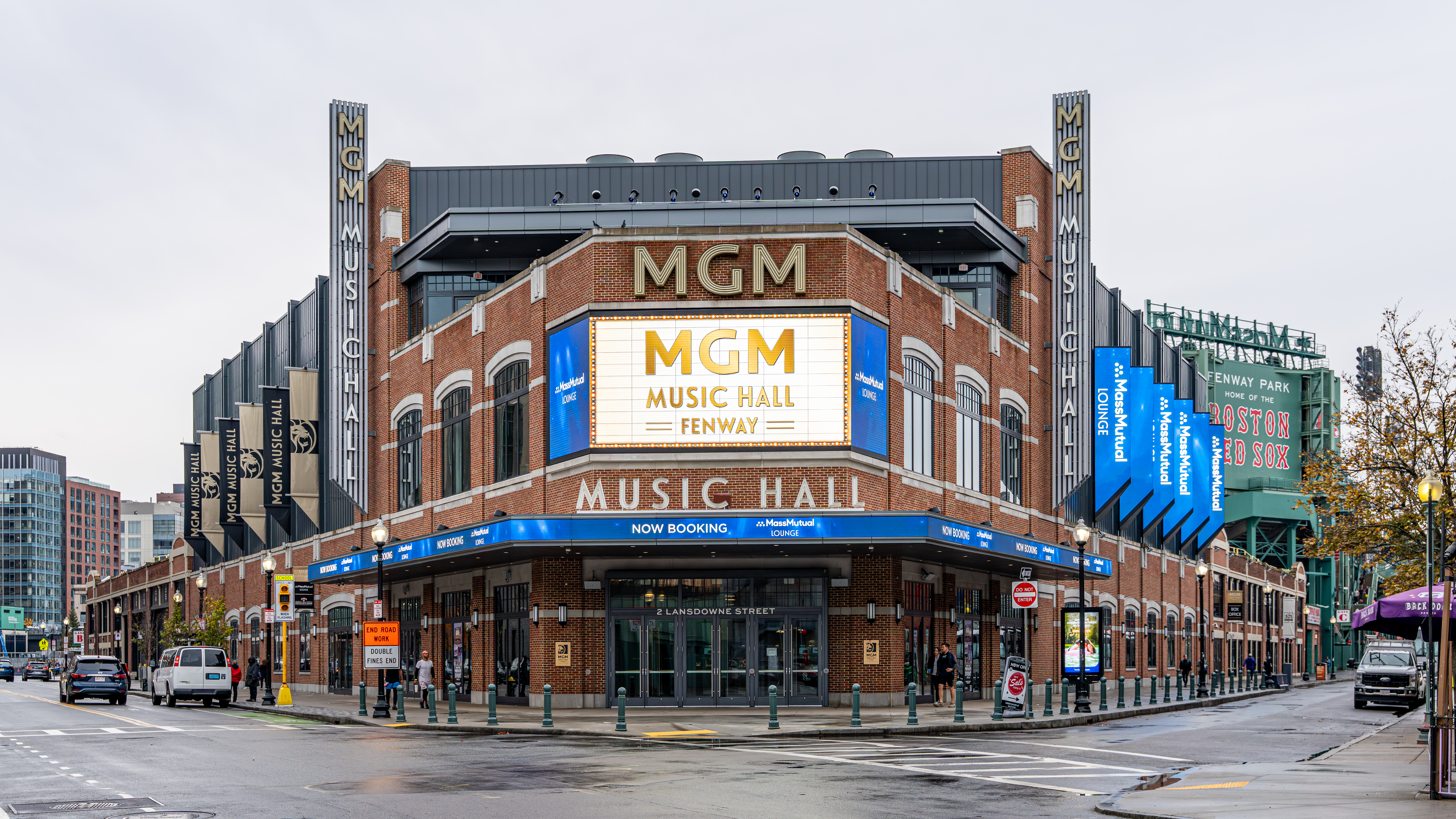
- (2025)
- Interactive map of MGM Music Hall at Fenway
- Full name: MGM Music Hall at Fenway, presented by Curve
- Address: 2 Lansdowne Street
- Location: Boston, Massachusetts, U.S.
- Coordinates: 42.34697222°N 71.09505556°W
- Owner: Fenway Sports Group
- Operator: Crossroads Presents
- Capacity: 5,009

Construction
- Groundbreaking: November 22, 2019
- Opened: August 22, 2022
- Architect: DAIQ Architects
- General contractor: Gilbane Building Company

Website
- Venue Website

The MGM Music Hall at Fenway is a 5,007-capacity music venue located directly northeast of Fenway Park in Boston, Massachusetts. Boston mayor Michelle Wu held the venue's ribbon-cutting ceremony on August 22, 2022, followed by a short private concert by Guster for the students of Tufts University. The venue's first public concert was performed by Godsmack, a rock band founded in Massachusetts, on August 27. The venue is owned by Fenway Sports Group and operated by Live Nation Entertainment.

== History ==
On September 28, 2018, the Fenway Sports Group (FSG) announced plans to build a 5,000 seat music venue on a lot along the northeast perimeter of Fenway Park, then mainly used for video production truck parking. Gilbane built the venue, originally simply known as Fenway Theater during construction, until a naming rights agreement was made with MGM Resorts International in November 2019. The MGM Music Hall at Fenway broke ground on November 22, 2019, and was initially intended to be complete in the fall of 2021.

The MGM Music Hall at Fenway opened its doors on August 22, 2022, a year later than expected, due to construction and performer delays in the wake of the COVID-19 pandemic, The opening ceremony featured a public ribbon-cutting, and a 30-minute private concert from the Boston-based rock band Guster for the students of Tufts University. Massachusetts rock band Godsmack performed the venue's first public concert on August 27.

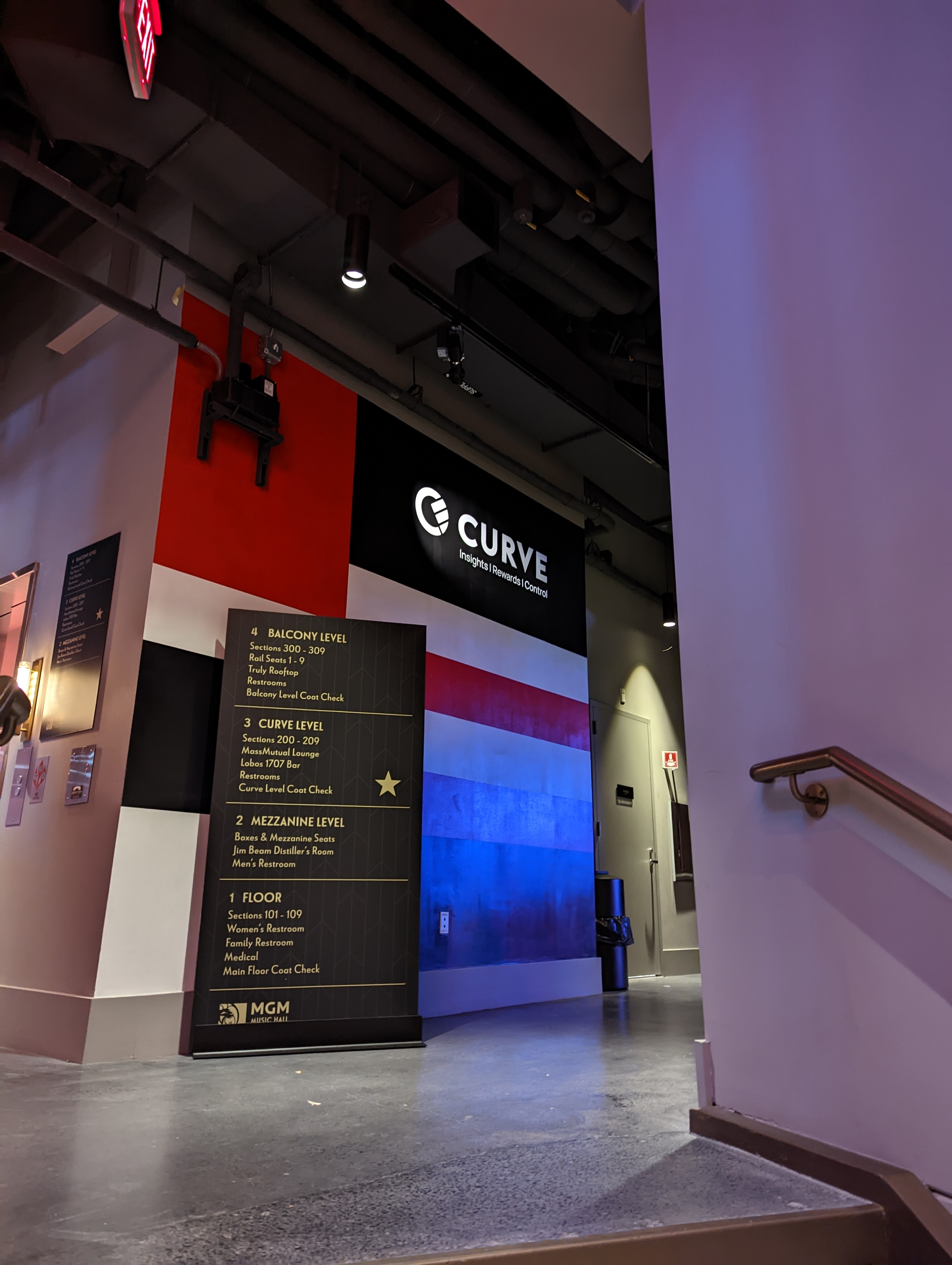
Curve Level at MGM Music Hall at Fenway

The MGM Music Hall at Fenway was used to host a Call of Duty League (CDL) Major with the hometown Boston Breach as the host, in 2024.

Irish pop band Westlife concert for their The Wild Dreams Tour on March 14, 2024.

Additionally, the venue hosted the 2025 Six Invitational, the world championship for the video game Tom Clancy's Rainbow Six Siege, from February 14 to 16, 2025.

On 16 and 17 April, All Elite Wrestling broadcast AEW Spring BreakThru live on TBS and Max from the venue. The April 16 broadcast was the 289th episode of AEW Dynamite, making it the longest-running prime time weekly pro-wrestling program in Turner Sports history, surpassing the former World Championship Wrestling's Monday Nitro, which had a total of 288 episodes that aired on TNT from September 1995 to March 2001.

In June 2025, Filipino pop group BINI performed in the venue as part of the Biniverse World Tour. The October, Pollstar listed the venue at their second most-popular club venue for the year.
