= Beach Break (2021) =

All Elite Wrestling television special

AEW Beach Break
- Promotional poster featuring various AEW Wrestlers
- Promotion: All Elite Wrestling
- Date: February 3, 2021
- City: Jacksonville, Florida
- Venue: Daily's Place
- Attendance: 700 (Note: The capacity at the venue was capped at 25–30% due to the COVID-19 pandemic in the United States. Attendees were seated in pods with physical distancing in place.)

Beach Break chronology
| ← Previous; First | Next → 2022 |

AEW Dynamite special episodes chronology
| ← Previous; New Year's Smash | Next → St. Patrick's Day Slam |

The 2021 Beach Break was a professional wrestling television special produced by All Elite Wrestling (AEW). It was the inaugural Beach Break and took place on February 3, 2021, at Daily's Place in Jacksonville, Florida, broadcast live on TNT as a special episode of AEW's weekly television program, Wednesday Night Dynamite. It replaced Bash at the Beach as the promotion's annual midwinter beach-themed event.

In the main event, Kenny Omega and The Good Brothers (Doc Gallows and Karl Anderson) defeated Jon Moxley and Death Triangle (Pac and Rey Fénix).

== Production ==
Other on-screen personnel
| Role | Name |
|---|---|
| Commentators | Jim Ross |
| Commentators | Excalibur |
| Commentators | Tony Schiavone |
| Commentators | Don Callis (Main event) |
| Ring announcer | Justin Roberts |
| Referees | Aubrey Edwards |
| Referees | Bryce Remsburg |
| Referees | Mike Posey |
| Referees | Paul Turner |
| Referees | Rick Knox |
| Interviewer | Alex Marvez |
| Wedding officiant | James Mitchell |

=== Background ===
On March 18, 2019, Cody Rhodes, who became a wrestler and an executive vice president of All Elite Wrestling (AEW), filed to trademark several World Championship Wrestling (WCW) event names that WWE (the owner of WCW's intellectual property) had let expire for AEW, including Bash at the Beach, on the basis that Dusty Rhodes, his father, created them. Accordingly, AEW held two Bash at the Beach events in 2020. In November of that year, a settlement was reached between Cody and WWE in which Cody gained the "Cody Rhodes" trademark, which WWE had held onto after his run in that company, in exchange for WWE gaining the WCW event name trademarks that Cody had claimed, including Bash at the Beach.

Two weeks after the trademark settlement was announced, Beach Break was announced to replace Bash at the Beach as the promotion's beach-themed event. It was scheduled to be held as a special episode of Dynamite in January 2021. However, the event was later rescheduled to February 3. Due to the ongoing COVID-19 pandemic, the event was held at Daily's Place in Jacksonville, Florida.

=== Storylines ===
Beach Break featured professional wrestling matches that involve different wrestlers from pre-existing scripted feuds and storylines. Wrestlers portrayed heroes, villains, or less distinguishable characters in scripted events that built tension and culminated in a wrestling match or series of matches. Storylines were produced on AEW's weekly television program, Dynamite, the supplementary online streaming show, Dark, and The Young Bucks' YouTube series Being The Elite.

At Winter Is Coming on December 2, 2020, Kenny Omega defeated Jon Moxley to win the AEW World Championship. Moxley returned at New Year's Smash Night 1 on January 6, 2021, to confront Omega, but he was attacked by Omega and The Good Brothers (Doc Gallows and Karl Anderson). On the January 20 episode of Dynamite, a six-man tag team match between Omega, Gallows, and Anderson against Moxley, Pac, and Rey Fénix was announced for Beach Break.

On the December 23 episode of Dynamite, Kip Sabian and Penelope Ford announced that they would be getting married at Beach Break. The best man Miro and his butler Charles Taylor were also announced to appear at the wedding.

On January 8, it was announced that a match between Dr. Britt Baker, D.M.D. and Thunder Rosa that was scheduled to be taped the previous day for the January 13 episode of Dynamite was cancelled due to Rosa coming into contact with a COVID-19-positive person. On January 13, the match was rescheduled for Beach Break.

On the January 20 episode of Dynamite, a tag team battle royal was announced for Beach Break, with the winners receiving an AEW World Tag Team Championship match at the Revolution pay-per-view on February 27. Top Flight (Darius Martin and Daunte Martin), The Acclaimed (Anthony Bowens and Max Caster), Private Party (Isiah Kassidy and Marq Quen), Jurassic Express (Jungle Boy and Luchasaurus), vs. The Inner Circle (Jake Hager and Sammy Guevara), (Santana and Ortiz), and (Chris Jericho and MJF), The Dark Order (Alex Reynolds and John Silver) and (Evil Uno and Stu Grayson), and The Young Bucks (Matt Jackson and Nick Jackson) were announced as participants. AEW World Tag Team Champions The Young Bucks (Matt Jackson and Nick Jackson) announced that they would also be participating in the battle royal and should they win, they would choose their Revolution opponents. FTR (Cash Wheeler and Dax Harwood) were originally set to take part in the battle royal, but they were removed from the match and suspended for a week by AEW after they attacked Jurassic Express (Jungle Boy and Luchasaurus) following Harwood's defeat to Jungle Boy during the January 27 episode of Dynamite. They were replaced by Alex Reynolds and John Silver of The Dark Order.

== Reception ==
Dave Meltzer of Wrestling Observer Newsletter gave Baker–Rosa 3.75 stars and the six-man tag team match 4.5 stars on his 5 star rating system.

=== Television ratings ===
Beach Break averaged 844,000 television viewers on TNT and a 0.32 rating in AEW's key demographic.

== Aftermath ==
After the main event, Kenta of New Japan Pro-Wrestling (NJPW) made his AEW debut and hit Jon Moxley with his finishing strike, the Go 2 Sleep. It was previously announced that Moxley will defend the IWGP United States Championship against Kenta on the February 26 episode of NJPW Strong, titled The New Beginning USA. It was subsequently announced that Kenta would team with Kenny Omega against Moxley and Lance Archer in a Falls Count Anywhere match on the February 10 episode of Dynamite.

It was also announced that Darby Allin would defend the AEW TNT Championship against Joey Janela, The Inner Circle (Chris Jericho and MJF) would take on The Acclaimed (Anthony Bowens and Max Caster), and the Nightmare Family (Cody Rhodes and Lee Johnson) would be pitted against Peter Avalon and Cezar Bononi for the February 10 episode of Dynamite.

All sixteen participants were announced for the AEW Women's World Championship Eliminator Tournament which emanated from the United States and Japan.

On the March 3 episode of Dynamite titled The Crossroads, Shaquille O'Neal and Jade Cargill defeated Cody Rhodes and Red Velvet.

A second Beach Break was held the following year in late January, thus establishing Beach Break as AEW's annual midwinter beach-themed event. Additionally, the second event was expanded to a two-part event, with the second part airing as a special episode of Rampage. Following the cancellation of Rampage at the end of 2024, the 2025 event had its second part moved to AEW's Saturday night program, Collision; however, the 2026 event would return to a one-night format as it was solely announced for Dynamite.

== Results ==
| No. | Results | Stipulations | Times |
|---|---|---|---|
| 1 | Chris Jericho (Note: Jericho's partner in the battle royal was MJF, thus they will challenge for the titles.) won by last eliminating Darius Martin (Note: Other competitors by order of elimination: Dante Martin, Alex Reynolds, Jake Hager, Matt Jackson, Anthony Bowens, Stu Grayson, Luchasaurus, Evil Uno, Marq Quen, John Silver, Ortiz, Santana, Isiah Kassidy, Nick Jackson, Jungle Boy, MJF, Max Caster, and Sammy Guevara) | Tag team battle royal for an AEW World Tag Team Championship match at Revolution; Had The Young Bucks (c) won, they would have chosen their opponents for Revolution. | 12:00 |
| 2 | Dr. Britt Baker, D.M.D. (with Rebel) defeated Thunder Rosa by knockout | Singles match | 13:15 |
| 3 | Adam Page and Matt Hardy defeated Chaos Project (Luther and Serpentico) | Tag team match | 3:55 |
| 4 | Lance Archer (with Jake Roberts) defeated Eddie Kingston (with The Butcher, The Blade, and The Bunny) | Lumberjack match | 7:00 |
| 5 | Kenny Omega and The Good Brothers (Doc Gallows and Karl Anderson) (with Don Callis) defeated Jon Moxley and Death Triangle (Pac and Rey Fénix) | Six-man tag team match | 15:25 |

== See also ==
- 2021 in professional wrestling
