= AEW Spring BreakThru =

2025 All Elite Wrestling two-part television special

Spring BreakThru
- Promotional poster featuring various AEW wrestlers
- Promotion: All Elite Wrestling
- Date: April 16 and 17, 2025
- City: Boston, Massachusetts
- Venue: MGM Music Hall at Fenway
- Attendance: 3,200

AEW Dynamite special episodes chronology
← Previous; Maximum Carnage	Next → Beach Break

AEW Collision special episodes chronology
← Previous; Homecoming	Next → Beach Break

AEW special event chronology
← Previous; Global Wars Australia	Next → Beach Break

Spring BreakThru was a two-part professional wrestling television special produced by All Elite Wrestling (AEW). It took place on April 16 and 17, 2025, at the MGM Music Hall at Fenway in Boston, Massachusetts, encompassing the broadcasts of Wednesday Night Dynamite and a special Thursday airing of Collision, the latter being preempted from its usual Saturday night time slot to accommodate TNT coverage of the Stanley Cup Playoffs. Both programs aired live, with Dynamite on April 16 on TBS in the United States and Collision on April 17 on TNT, also in the United States, with both shows also simulcast on the streaming service Max.

A total of 12 matches were held across both nights, with five on Dynamite and seven on Collision. In the main event of Dynamite, The Opps (Samoa Joe, Powerhouse Hobbs, and Katsuyori Shibata) defeated the Death Riders (Claudio Castagnoli, Wheeler Yuta, and interim title holder Jon Moxley) to win the AEW World Trios Championship, while in the main event of Collision, Kris Statlander and Julia Hart defeated Mercedes Moné and Harley Cameron. The Dynamite broadcast was also notable for the AEW debut of former two-time Impact World Champion Josh Alexander, and the Dynamite broadcast was the 289th episode of the program, making it the longest-running prime time weekly pro-wrestling program in Turner Sports history, surpassing the former World Championship Wrestling's Monday Nitro, which had 288 episodes.

== Production ==
=== Background ===
AEW Dynamite, also referred to as Wednesday Night Dynamite, is the flagship weekly professional wrestling television program of the American company All Elite Wrestling (AEW). It has aired on Ted Turner founded channels and networks since its inception, premiering on TNT on October 2, 2019, before moving to TNT's sister channel TBS on January 5, 2022. AEW Collision, also known as Saturday Night Collision, is AEW's secondary program that premiered in June 2023 on TNT. Since January 1, 2025, both programs have been simulcast on their respective TV channels and the streaming service Max. TNT, TBS, and Max are all owned and distributed by Warner Bros. Discovery.

On March 8, 2025, AEW filed to trademark "Spring BreakThru". On March 23, the company announced that Spring BreakThru would be a television special that would take place at the MGM Music Hall at Fenway in Boston, Massachusetts. It was originally announced to only air as a special episode of Dynamite on April 16, but on March 28, it was announced that Spring BreakThru would be a two-part special that would also encompass a special episode of Collision on Thursday, April 17. Both programs aired live on their respective nights and channels, with Collision being preempted from its usual Saturday night time slot to avoid counterprogramming against Night 1 of WWE's WrestleMania 41 and also to accommodate TNT's coverage of the Stanley Cup Playoffs. The April 16 broadcast was the 289th episode of Dynamite, making it the longest-running prime time weekly pro-wrestling program in Turner Sports history, surpassing the former World Championship Wrestling's Monday Nitro, which had a total of 288 episodes that aired on TNT from September 1995 to March 2001.

=== Storylines ===
Spring BreakThru featured professional wrestling matches that involved different wrestlers from pre-existing scripted feuds and storylines. Storylines were produced on AEW's weekly television programs, Dynamite and Collision.

== Results ==
Night 1 - Dynamite (aired live April 16)
No.	Results	Stipulations	Times
1	Mercedes Moné defeated Athena by pinfall	Women's Owen Hart Cup Tournament Semifinal match	21:44
2	"Hangman" Adam Page defeated Josh Alexander by pinfall	Men's Owen Hart Cup Tournament Quarterfinal match	13:11
3	The Hurt Syndicate (Bobby Lashley and Shelton Benjamin) (c) (with MVP) defeated Gates of Agony (Toa Liona and Bishop Kaun) by pinfall	Tag team match for the AEW World Tag Team Championship	8:26
4	Will Ospreay defeated Konosuke Takeshita (with Don Callis) by pinfall	Men's Owen Hart Cup Tournament Semifinal match	21:09
5	The Opps (Samoa Joe, Powerhouse Hobbs, and Katsuyori Shibata) defeated Death Riders (Claudio Castagnoli, Wheeler Yuta, and interim champion Jon Moxley) (c) by submission	Trios match for the AEW World Trios Championship	13:49
(c) / – the champion(s) heading into the match

Night 2 - Collision (aired live April 17)
No.	Results	Stipulations	Times
1	Kevin Knight defeated Lance Archer by pinfall	Singles match	11:40
2	The Don Callis Family (Konosuke Takeshita and Josh Alexander) defeated The Conglomeration (Tomohiro Ishii and Rocky Romero) by pinfall	Tag team match	10:20
3	Megan Bayne (with Penelope Ford) defeated Rebecca Scott and Ashley Vox by pinfall	2-on-1 Handicap match	1:20
4	Adam Cole (c) defeated Claudio Castagnoli by pinfall	Singles match for the AEW TNT Championship	15:15
5	La Facción Ingobernable (Rush, Dralístico, and The Beast Mortos) defeated KM, Rosario Grillo, and LSG by pinfall	Trios match	1:50
6	Nick Wayne defeated Komander (c) (with Alex Abrahantes) by pinfall	Singles match for the ROH World Television Championship	10:55
7	Kris Statlander and Julia Hart defeated Mercedes Moné and Harley Cameron by pinfall	Tag team match	11:05
(c) / – the champion(s) heading into the match
