= The Opps =

Professional wrestling stable

Stable
- Name: The Opps
- Leader: Samoa Joe
- Members: Hook; Katsuyori Shibata; Action Andretti
- Billed heights: Joe: 6 ft 2 in (1.88 m); Hook: 6 ft 0 in (1.83 m); Shibata: 6 ft 0 in (1.83 m); Andretti: 5 ft 8 in (1.73 m)
- Combined billed weight: 1,138 lb (516 kg)
- Former members: Powerhouse Hobbs; Anthony Bowens
- Debut: February 12, 2025
- Years active: 2025–present

The Opps are a professional wrestling stable that performs in All Elite Wrestling (AEW). The villainous stable consists of leader Samoa Joe, Hook, Katsuyori Shibata, and Action Andretti. Andretti is the reigning ROH World Television Champion. Joe is a former AEW World Champion (once as part of the group and twice overall), alongside being a former one-time AEW World Trios Champion alongside Shibata and former member Powerhouse Hobbs.

== History ==
=== Occasional team-ups and official formation (2024–2025) ===
Following his loss to Swerve Strickland, Samoa Joe turned face and formed a tag team with Hook. After a short feud with the Premier Athletes, Joe, Hook, and Katsuyori Shibata defeated Chris Jericho's Learning Tree stable and Jeff Cobb in a trios match at Forbidden Door in June 2024. In July 2024, Joe was removed from the Scotiabank Saddledome in an ambulance after losing a "Stampede Street Fight" to Jericho when Jericho drove him through a wall using a forklift; the angle was used to explain Joe going on hiatus to film season two of Twisted Metal. Joe returned in January 2025 at AEW Maximum Carnage, saving Hook from an attack by The Patriarchy. In February 2025, the trio of Joe, Hook, and Shibata were named "The Opps."

=== Championship reigns and heel turn (2025–present) ===
In April 2025, at Dynamite: Spring BreakThru, Joe, Shibata, and Powerhouse Hobbs (substituting for an injured Hook) defeated the Death Riders for the AEW World Trios Championship. The next night at Collision: Spring BreakThru, Joe inducted Hobbs as a member of The Opps. On May 14 at Dynamite: Beach Break, Joe unsuccessfully challenged Death Riders leader Jon Moxley for the AEW World Championship in a steel cage match. On May 25 at Double or Nothing, The Opps teamed with Kenny Omega, Swerve Strickland, and Willow Nightingale to defeat the Death Riders and The Young Bucks in an Anarchy in the Arena match. On July 12 at All In: Texas, The Opps successfully defended the AEW World Trios Championship against the Death Riders and Gabe Kidd. After the match, Joe was attacked by the Death Riders and stretchered off; the angle was used to allow Joe to go on hiatus to promote season two of Twisted Metal. Joe returned the following month, with the Opps successfully defending the AEW World Trios Championship against Bullet Club War Dogs at Forbidden Door: London. At All Out in September 2025, Joe and Hobbs defeated the WorkHorsemen (Anthony Henry and JD Drake). In the same month, Hook returned from injury but departed The Opps.

On the October 1, 2025 episode of Dynamite, Joe and Hobbs teamed with AEW World Champion "Hangman" Adam Page to defeat the Death Riders. Following the match, an argument broke out between Joe and Page, leading Page to challenge Joe to a match for Page's World Championship at WrestleDream later that month. After Page defeated Joe at WrestleDream, Joe and the rest of the Opps turned heel and attacked Page, leading to a rematch at Full Gear on November 22, 2025, where Joe defeated Page in a steel cage match with the assistance of Hook, winning the AEW World Championship for a second time. On December 27 at Worlds End, Joe defended the AEW World Championship against Page, MJF, and Swerve Strickland in a four-way match; MJF pinned him to win the title, ending his second reign after 35 days.

On January 14, 2026 taping of Collision: Maximum Carnage, the Opps lost the trios titles to Page and JetSpeed (Kevin Knight and "Speedball" Mike Bailey), which aired on tape delay on January 17, ending their reign at 273 days (276 days as recognized by AEW due to the tape delay). This would also be Hobbs' last appearance in AEW and as a member of The Opps due to his AEW contract expiring on January 15. On the February 7 episode of Collision, Hook announced that he would temporarily take leadership of The Opps due to Joe suffering an undisclosed injury. Joe returned from injury on the April 22 episode of Dynamite. On April 25 at Collision: Playoff Palooza, Anthony Bowens joined The Opps..On August 21 at Death Before Dishonor, Action Andretti defeated Lio Rush in a Fight Without Honor to win the ROH World Television Championship with assistance from the Opps, who Andretti would later join. On October 1, it was reported that Bowens' contract expired and he had become a free agent, leaving his status in the Opps unknown.

== Members ==
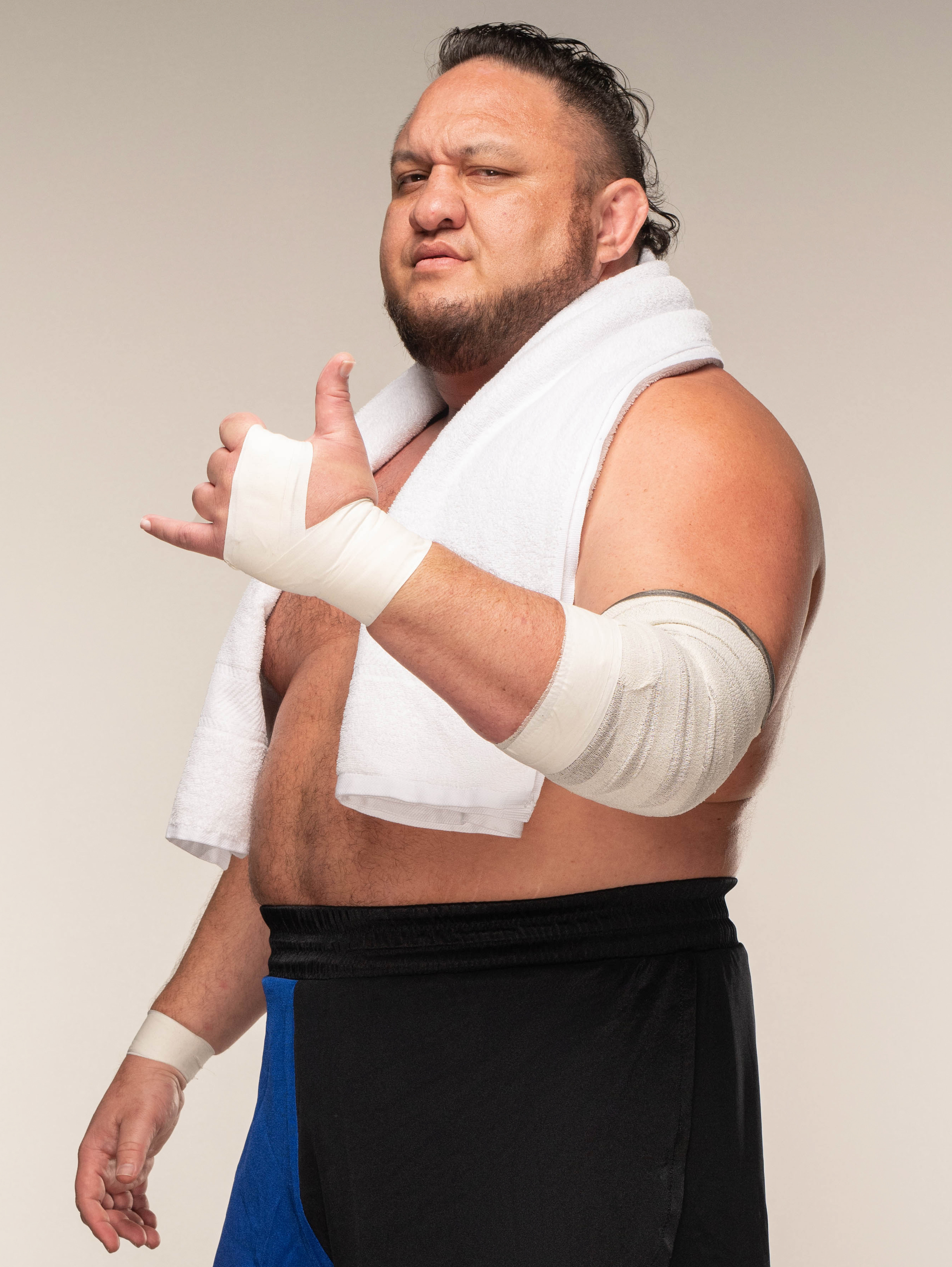
Samoa Joe (*/L)

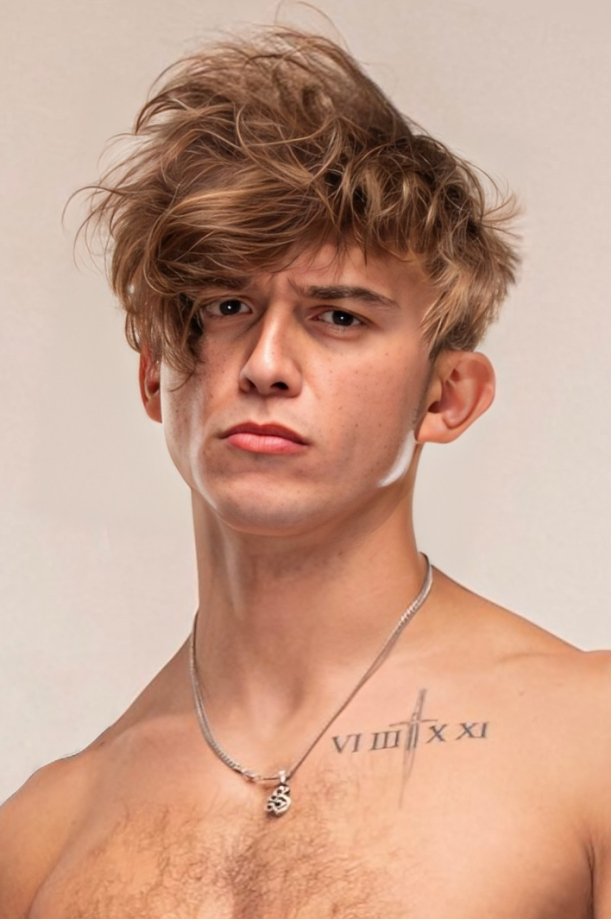
Hook (*)

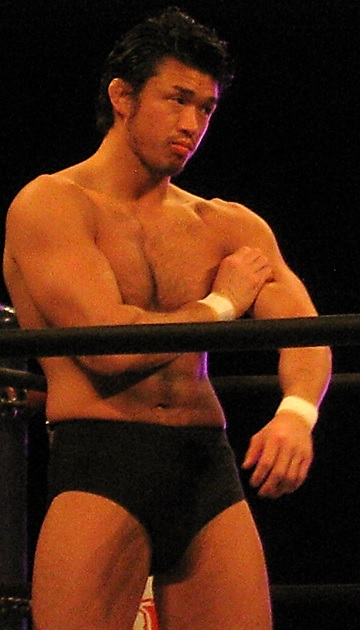
Katsuyori Shibata (*)

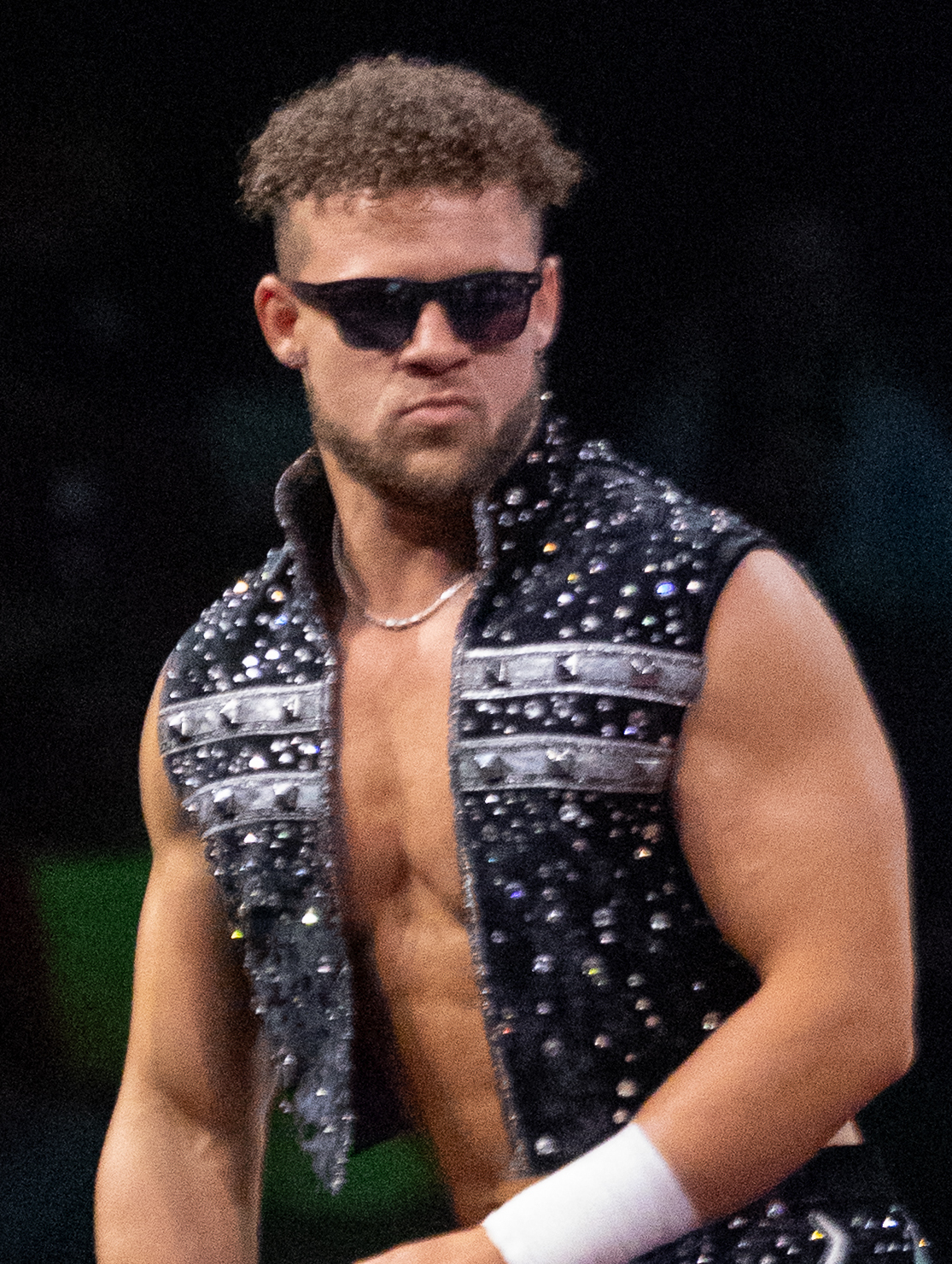
Action Andretti

*	Founding member(s)
L	Leader

=== Current ===
Member		Joined
Samoa Joe	*L	February 12, 2025
Hook	*	February 12, 2025; November 22, 2025
Katsuyori Shibata	*	February 12, 2025
Action Andretti		August 21, 2026

=== Former ===
Member	Joined	Left
Powerhouse Hobbs	April 17, 2025	January 17, 2026
Anthony Bowens	April 25, 2026	October 1, 2026

== Championships and accomplishments ==
- All Elite Wrestling
  - AEW World Championship (1 time) – Joe
  - AEW World Trios Championship (1 time) – Shibata, Hobbs, and Joe
- Pro Wrestling Illustrated
    - Ranked Katsuyori Shibata No. 126 of the top 500 singles wrestlers in the PWI 500 of 2025.
    - Ranked Powerhouse Hobbs No. 138 of the top 500 singles wrestlers in the PWI 500 of 2025.
    - Ranked Samoa Joe No. 28 of the top 500 singles wrestlers in the PWI 500 of 2026.
    - Ranked Hook No. 286 of the top 500 singles wrestlers in the PWI 500 of 2026.
    - Ranked Action Andretti No. 410 of the top 500 singles wrestlers in the PWI 500 of 2026.
- Ring of Honor
  - ROH World Television Champion (1 time, current) – Andretti
