= Beach Break (2025) =

All Elite Wrestling television special

- Promotional poster featuring various AEW wrestlers
- Promotion: All Elite Wrestling
- Date: May 14, 2025 (aired May 14 and 17, 2025)
- City: Hoffman Estates, Illinois
- Venue: Now Arena
- Attendance: 4,982

Beach Break chronology
← Previous; 2024	Next → 2026

AEW Dynamite special episodes chronology
← Previous; Spring BreakThru	Next → Fyter Fest

AEW Collision special episodes chronology
← Previous; Spring BreakThru	Next → Fyter Fest

The 2025 Beach Break was a two-part professional wrestling television special produced by All Elite Wrestling (AEW). It was the fourth Beach Break event and took place on May 14, 2025, at the Now Arena in Hoffman Estates, Illinois. The two-part event was broadcast as special episodes of AEW's weekly television programs, Wednesday Night Dynamite and Saturday Night Collision. Dynamite aired live on TBS while Collision aired on tape delay on TNT on May 17, with both shows simulcast on Max in the United States, though the Collision broadcast abruptly ended 30 minutes earlier than intended due to technical difficulties. It featured appearances from 21-time world champion Ric Flair and the family of Steve McMichael.

== Production ==
=== Background ===
Beach Break is a recurring professional wrestling television special produced by All Elite Wrestling (AEW) since 2021, airing as special episodes of AEW's weekly television programs. It was originally a one-night special but expanded to two nights in 2022. An event was not held in 2023 but returned in 2024. On April 22, 2025, AEW announced that the fourth Beach Break would take place on May 14, 2025, emanating from the Now Arena in Hoffman Estates, Illinois. Due to the cancellation of Friday Night Rampage at the end of 2024, the first part of the 2025 Beach Break aired live as Wednesday Night Dynamite on TBS while the second part, which previously aired as Rampage, was scheduled to broadcast on tape delay as Saturday Night Collision on May 17 on TNT, with both shows simulcast on Max.

=== Storylines ===
Beach Break featured professional wrestling matches that involved different wrestlers from pre-existing scripted feuds and storylines. Storylines were produced on AEW's weekly television programs, Dynamite and Collision.

== Results ==
Night 1 - Dynamite (aired live May 14)
No.	Results	Stipulations	Times
1	"Hangman" Adam Page and Will Ospreay defeated The Don Callis Family (Konosuke Takeshita and Josh Alexander) (with Don Callis) by pinfall	Tag team match	18:33
2	Ricochet defeated Zach Gowen by pinfall	Singles match	8:19
3	The Hurt Syndicate (Bobby Lashley and Shelton Benjamin) (c) (with MVP) defeated Top Flight (Dante Martin and Darius Martin) (with Leila Grey) by technical submission	AEW World Tag Team Championship Eliminator match	5:12
4	Mina Shirakawa defeated "Timeless" Toni Storm (c) (with Luther), Skye Blue, and AZM by pinfall	AEW Women's World Championship Four-way Eliminator match Since Shirakawa won, she earned an AEW Women's World Championship match at Double or Nothing against Storm	12:24
5	Jon Moxley (c) (with Marina Shafir) defeated Samoa Joe by pinfall	Steel Cage match for the AEW World Championship	15:21
(c) / – the champion(s) heading into the match

Night 2 - Collision (taped May 14, airing May 17)
No.	Results	Stipulations	Times
1	Megan Bayne (with Penelope Ford) defeated Anna Jay (with Harley Cameron) by pinfall	Singles match	7:30
2	Kyle Fletcher defeated AR Fox by pinfall	Singles match	9:25
3	Bandido, Brody King, and Tomohiro Ishii defeated The Don Callis Family (Lance Archer, Rocky Romero, and Trent Beretta) by pinfall	Trios match	6:55
4	"Speedball" Mike Bailey defeated Blake Christian (with Lee Johnson) by pinfall	Singles match	5:10
5	The Learning Tree (Big Bill and Bryan Keith) defeated Gates of Agony (Bishop Kaun and Toa Liona) by pinfall	Chicago Street Fight	13:55
6	The Sons of Texas (Dustin Rhodes and Sammy Guevara) defeated CRU (Action Andretti and Lio Rush) by pinfall	Tag team match to determine the #1 contenders for the AEW World Tag Team Championship at Double or Nothing	11:55
7	Powerhouse Hobbs defeated Wheeler Yuta by pinfall	Singles match	11:45
