= The Hurt Syndicate =

Professional wrestling stable

- The stable's logo since October 2024

Statistics
- Names: The Hurt Business; The Hurt Syndicate
- Members: Bobby Lashley; Shelton Benjamin; MVP (manager/trios partner)
- Billed heights: MVP: 6 ft 3 in (1.91 m); Lashley: 6 ft 3 in (1.91 m); Benjamin: 6 ft 2 in (1.88 m)
- Former members: Cedric Alexander; MJF
- Debut: May 11, 2020
- Years active: 2020–2022; 2024–present

The Hurt Syndicate is an American professional wrestling stable in All Elite Wrestling (AEW). The group consists of Bobby Lashley, Shelton Benjamin, and MVP, who serves as their manager and occasional trios partner.

Lashley, Benjamin, and MVP (joined by Cedric Alexander) previously performed in WWE from 2020 to 2022, where they were known as The Hurt Business. The stable was the center point of the ThunderDome era during the COVID-19 pandemic. The group held four different championships seven times, with Lashley holding the WWE and United States Championships while Alexander and Benjamin held the Raw Tag Team Championship once and the 24/7 Championship four times; Benjamin held it three times and Alexander held it once. The group was gradually disbanded after Lashley and MVP left the group in early 2022, but Alexander and Benjamin continued to function as a tag team under The Hurt Business name until that August.

After leaving WWE, MVP, Lashley, and Benjamin reformed the group in AEW from October 2024 as The Hurt Syndicate. In January 2025, Benjamin and Lashley would go to win the AEW World Tag Team Championship. In May 2025, MJF joined the group but left that August.

== History ==
=== WWE (2020–2022) ===
The stable's logo as The Hurt Business

==== Formation and championship reigns (2020–2021) ====
On the May 11, 2020 episode of Raw, MVP aligned himself with Bobby Lashley, with MVP promising to manage Lashley to a WWE Championship reign. At Backlash, Lashley failed to capture the WWE Championship from Drew McIntyre following a distraction from his on-screen wife Lana. The following night on Raw, Lashley blamed Lana for his loss at Backlash and he would then ask for a divorce, thus ending their romantic storyline.

On the June 22 episode of Raw, Lashley attacked United States Champion Apollo Crews and placed him in his full nelson hold after he turned down MVP's offer to join them. After defeating Crews in a non-title match, MVP unveiled a new United States Championship design and declared himself the "real" United States Champion. This set up a match between Crews and MVP at The Horror Show at Extreme Rules; however, Crews was pulled out from the match the day of the event, with the reason given by WWE being that he was not declared medically fit to compete, while media such as Forbes reported rumors that Crews had tested positive for COVID-19. As a result, MVP won the match by forfeit, and afterwards, declared himself the new United States Champion; however, this was not recognized by WWE. The following night on Raw, MVP and Lashley added Shelton Benjamin into their group as the duo helped Benjamin capture the 24/7 Championship from R-Truth. The group was formally named "The Hurt Business", and the faction was presented as a high-end team, often wearing expensive, fashionable suits. Crews returned from hiatus on the August 3 episode of Raw and retained his title against MVP, taking the new title design in the process. Following this, The Hurt Business began feuding with Crews' allies, Ricochet and Cedric Alexander, with both groups exchanging victories and attacks throughout the following weeks on Raw. During his time in the stable, Benjamin won the 24/7 Championships two more times, both coming on the August 17 episode of Raw.

While MVP lost another title match against Crews at SummerSlam, Lashley would defeat Crews at Payback to win the WWE United States Championship. On the September 7 episode of Raw, Cedric Alexander joined The Hurt Business.

While Lashley defended the title against Slapjack, at Hell in a Cell, Cedric and Benjamin won the Tag Team Championships from The New Day at TLC: Tables, Ladders & Chairs. Despite Lashley losing the United States Championship at Elimination Chamber, he defeated The Miz on the March 1 episode of Raw to win the WWE Championship, becoming the third African-American to win the title.

On the March 15 episode of Raw, Alexander and Benjamin lost the Raw Tag Team Championship back to The New Day, ending their reign at 85 days. On the March 29 episode of Raw, Lashley lambasted Alexander and Benjamin due to them losing the Raw Tag Team Championships and losing to Drew McIntyre in a 2-on-1 handicap match, a loss that meant they would be barred from ringside at Lashley's WWE Championship match at WrestleMania 37 against McIntyre. This led to Lashley attacking Alexander and Benjamin and declaring that The Hurt Business was over for the two of them, thus kicking them out of the faction. While Benjamin and Alexander subsequently started to feud with each other, MVP continued to reference The Hurt Business on television, as well as state on social media that the group was still in action, but it just composed of him and Lashley.

Lashley would go on to retain his title by defeating Drew McIntyre in three consecutive title defenses. The first was in the opening match of WrestleMania 37, the second at WrestleMania Backlash in a triple threat match against McIntyre and Strowman, then finally at Hell in a Cell in a Last Chance Hell in a Cell match. This removed McIntyre from title contention for the duration of Lashley's reign. Lashley would begin feuding with Kofi Kingston where a match for the WWE Championship was made between the two at Money in the Bank. At the event, Lashley retained the title against Kingston. On the July 19 episode of Raw, Goldberg would return and challenge Lashley for the WWE Championship. Initially, Lashley would reject the challenge at first, but on the August 2 episode of Raw, Lashley would accept Goldberg's challenge and the match would be made official for SummerSlam. At the event, Lashley would retain the WWE Championship due to referee stoppage after Goldberg could no longer continue. On the September 13 episode of Raw, after successfully defending the title against Randy Orton, Lashley lost the WWE Championship to Big E who cashed in his Money in the Bank briefcase, ending his reign at 196 days. On the same episode of Raw, MVP was put out of action due to injury for an undetermined period of time.

==== Reunion (2021–2022) ====
On the September 27 episode of Raw, Benjamin and Alexander helped Lashley fight off The New Day and in the process, reuniting The Hurt Business. During the 2021 WWE Draft on October 4, The Hurt Business was drafted to remain on Raw. At Crown Jewel, Cedric Alexander and Shelton Benjamin would lose to The Usos on the pre-show, while Lashley would later be defeated by Goldberg in a No Holds Barred match. On the November 22, 2021 episode of Raw, Alexander defeated Reggie to win the WWE 24/7 Championship, however he lost it to Dana Brooke.

==== Departure of Lashley and MVP and final separation (2022) ====
On the January 10, 2022 episode of Raw, Lashley told Alexander and Benjamin that he worked alone and that "there is no more Hurt Business", and later that night the duo would attack him, confirming MVP and Lashley's departure and dissolving the team as a stable in the process.

Benjamin and Alexander would continue to function as a tag team and continued to attack Lashley on the following episodes of Raw, being referred to as The Hurt Business by the commentary team until August 8, 2022, when Alexander defeated Benjamin in the Main Event tapings.

==== Teased reunion (2023) ====
On the January 9, 2023 episode of Raw, Benjamin and Alexander reunited to take part in a Tag Team Turmoil match. Earlier during the show, Lashley and MVP, who was managing Omos, teased an alliance, with MVP crediting himself for reuniting Benjamin and Alexander, and getting Lashley reinstated on Raw after being suspended. After MVP and Lashley left WWE, they complained about how the company booked the stable and also revealed they tried to reunite the stable on several occasions to no avail. MVP would later go on to accuse WWE of stealing the stable's gimmick and giving it to The Bloodline.

=== All Elite Wrestling (2024–present) ===
In September 2024, MVP made his debut in All Elite Wrestling (AEW) at Dynamite: Grand Slam, while Benjamin and Lashley respectively debuted at Dynamite's 5 Year Anniversary and Fright Night Dynamite the following month, thus reuniting the original trio and renaming the group to The Hurt Syndicate, and establishing themselves as heels with their first feud being against Swerve Strickland, who Lashley defeated at Full Gear in November. Between November and December, Benjamin competed in the 2024 Continental Classic, where he was placed in the Blue league. Benjamin finished the tournament with 6 points, but failed to advance to the playoff stage.

On the January 22, 2025 episode of Dynamite, Benjamin and Lashley defeated AEW World Tag Team Champions Private Party (Isiah Kassidy and Marq Quen) to capture the titles. In March, MVP attempted to recruit MJF into the group, who would be rejected by both Benjamin and Lashley. Over the next following weeks, MJF would continue to attempt to join the group by attempting to impress Lashley and Benjamin by offering various gifts and assisting the duo in retaining their titles on April 6 at Dynasty against The Learning Tree (Big Bill and Bryan Keith), but would continue to be rejected. However, after viciously attacking Top Flight (Dante Martin and Darius Martin) on the May 7 episode of the Dynamite, MJF was accepted into the group the following week at Dynamite: Beach Break. On July 12 at All In, The Hurt Syndicate had major success as Lashley and Benjamin successfully defended their titles, while MJF won the men's Casino Gauntlet match and earned a future shot at the AEW World Championship at any time he wants. After weeks of tension, MJF was unanimously voted out of the stable on August 6 episode of Dynamite. On August 24 at Forbidden Door, Lashley and Benjamin lost their titles to Brodido (Bandido and Brody King) in a three-way match, ending their reign at 214 days.

After losing the tag titles, The Hurt Syndicate then began a feud with The Demand (Ricochet, Bishop Kaun, and Toa Liona), turning face for the first time as a stable in the process. The Hurt Syndicate lost to The Demand at All Out on September 20 in a regular trios match, but defeated them in a rematch at Dynamite: Title Tuesday on October 7 in a Street Fight and on October 18 at WrestleDream in a tornado trios match to become the number one contenders for the AEW World Trios Championship, but failed to defeat The Opps (Samoa Joe, Powerhouse Hobbs, and Katsuyori Shibata) for the titles after Ricochet interfered. In December 2025, it was reported that Lashley had suffered an injury and would miss "substantial time".

On the April 2, 2026 episode of Collision, Lashley returned to AEW television with his stablemates in a backstage segment. At Double or Nothing on May 24, Benjamin and Lashley were a part of Jericho's team in Stadium Stampede, where they defeated Ricochet's team.

== Members ==
*	Founding member
M	Manager

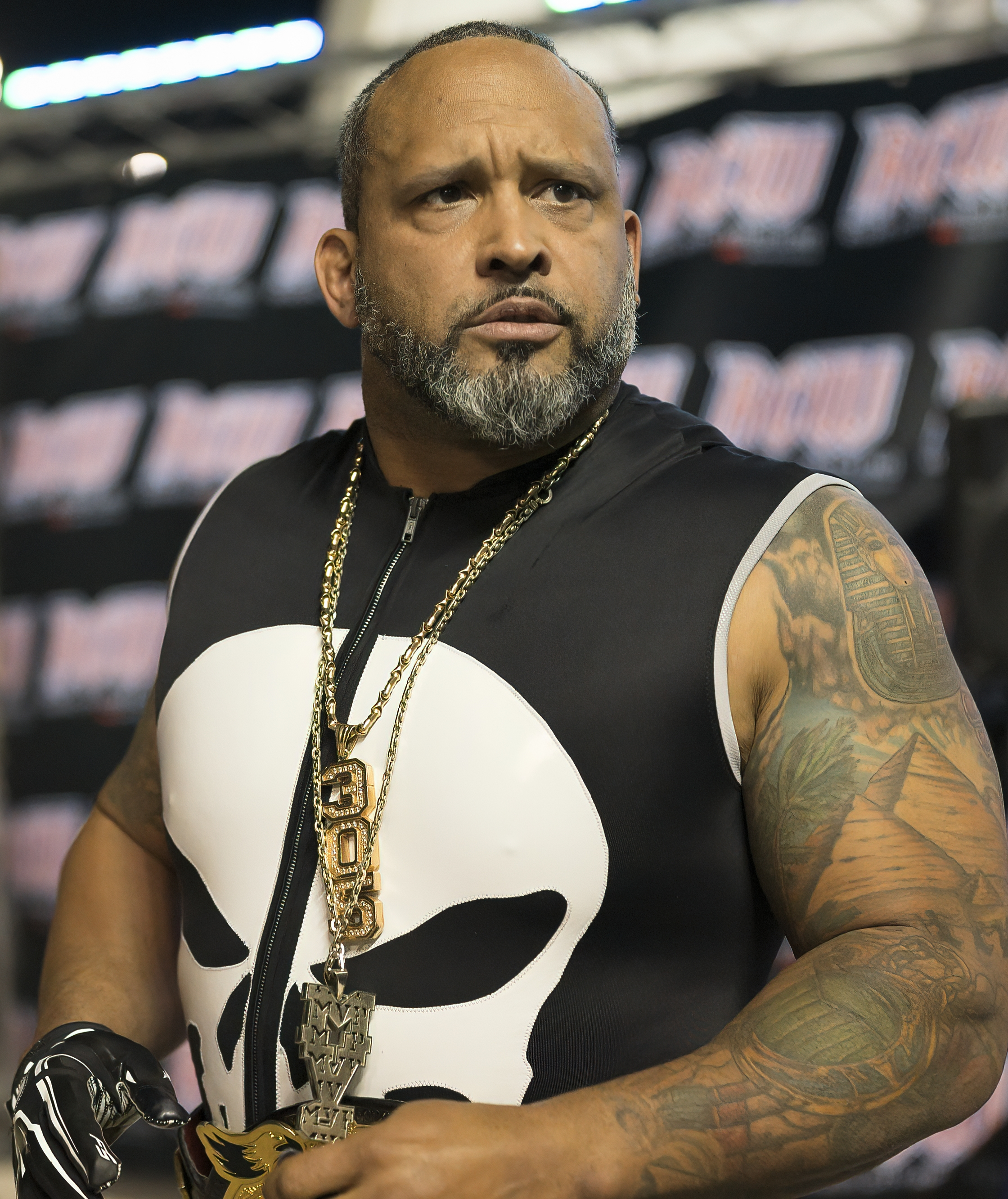
MVP (M)

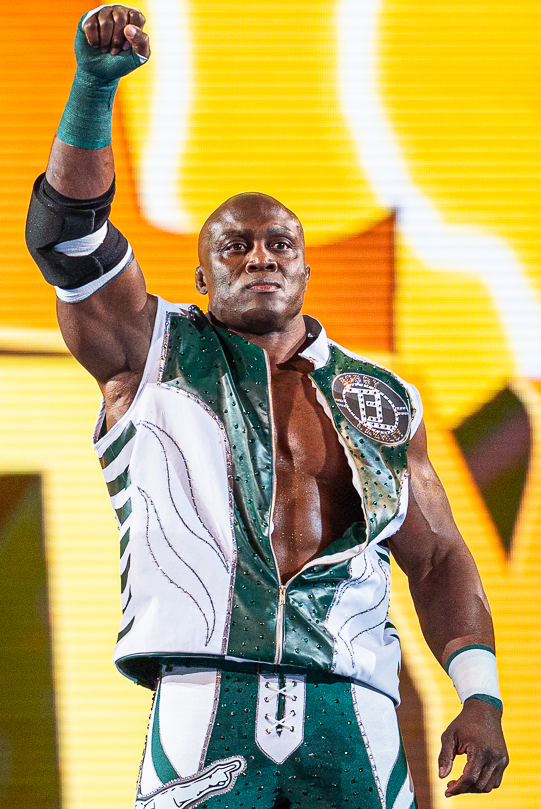
Bobby Lashley

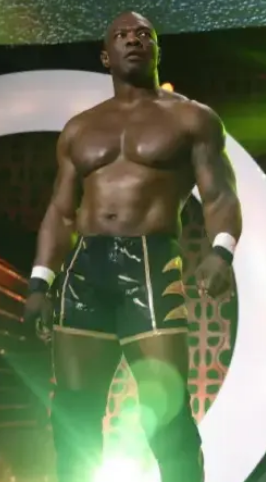
Shelton Benjamin

=== Current ===
Member		Joined
MVP (Note: MVP left the group on January 10, 2022. He rejoined on October 2, 2024 in AEW.)	*M	May 11, 2020
Bobby Lashley (Note: Lashley left the group on January 10, 2022. He rejoined on October 30, 2024 in AEW.)	*	May 11, 2020
Shelton Benjamin (Note: Benjamin was kicked out of the group on March 29, 2021. He rejoined the group on September 27, 2021 and left on August 8, 2022. He once again rejoined the group on October 2, 2024 in AEW.)		July 20, 2020

=== Former ===
Member	Joined	Left
Cedric Alexander (Note: Alexander was kicked out of the group March 29, 2021 but rejoined on September 27, 2021.)	September 7, 2020	August 8, 2022
MJF	May 21, 2025	August 6, 2025

== Championships and accomplishments ==
- 4th Rope Wrestling
  - 4th Rope Heavyweight Championship (1 time, current) – Lashley
- All Elite Wrestling
  - AEW World Tag Team Championship (1 time) – Lashley and Benjamin
  - Casino Gauntlet match (2025) – MJF
- Australian Championship Wrestling
  - ACW World Championship (1 time, current) – Lashley
- Consejo Mundial de Lucha Libre
  - CMLL World Light Heavyweight Championship (1 time) – MJF
- WWE
  - WWE Championship (2 times) – Lashley
  - WWE United States Championship (1 time) – Lashley
  - WWE Raw Tag Team Championship (1 time) – Benjamin and Alexander
  - WWE 24/7 Championship (4 times) – Benjamin (3), Alexander (1)
  - Slammy Award for Trash Talker of the Year (2020)
