= AEW Bash at the Beach =

2020 All Elite Wrestling television special

- Promotional poster featuring various AEW wrestlers
- Promotion: All Elite Wrestling
- Date: January 15 and 21, 2020 (aired January 15 and 22, 2020)
- City: Coral Gables, Florida (January 15); Miami, Florida to Nassau, Bahamas (January 21)
- Venue: Watsco Center (January 15); Norwegian Pearl (January 21)
- Attendance: 3,900

AEW Dynamite special episodes chronology
← Previous; Homecoming	Next → Fyter Fest

AEW Bash at the Beach was a series of professional wrestling events produced by All Elite Wrestling (AEW). The two-part, nine-day event began on January 15, 2020, from the Watsco Center in Coral Gables, Florida with a special episode of Dynamite, which aired as a television special on TNT. The series continued with Chris Jericho's Rock 'N' Wrestling Rager at Sea, with matches from the cruise airing on the January 22 episode of Dynamite. The events continued until January 24. The event takes its name from the World Championship Wrestling (WCW) pay-per-view WCW Bash at the Beach. The event was replaced by Beach Break in 2021 after a trademark disagreement and settlement was reached between WWE and Cody Rhodes.

== Production ==
Other on-screen personnel
Role	Name
Commentators	Jim Ross
Commentators	Excalibur
Commentators	Tony Schiavone
Ring announcer	Justin Roberts
Referees	Aubrey Edwards
Referees	Bryce Remsburg
Referees	Paul Turner
Referees	Rick Knox
Interviewer	Jenn Decker

=== Background ===
From 1994 to 2000, World Championship Wrestling (WCW) held a series of pay-per-view shows called Bash at the Beach, which was created by Dusty Rhodes. WWE (then known as the World Wrestling Federation) purchased WCW in 2001 and acquired their intellectual property, including the trademark for Bash at the Beach. In 2004/2005, WWE allowed this trademark to expire. Dusty's son Cody Rhodes, who became a wrestler and an executive vice president of All Elite Wrestling (AEW), trademarked several terms for AEW, including "Bash at the Beach" on March 18, 2019, due to it being one of his father's creations. Cody commented on these filings stating that they were personal and most would not be used by AEW. However, on November 18, 2019, the promotion announced that the January 15, 2020, episode of Dynamite would be a special episode titled Bash at the Beach as part of a ten-day event from Coral Gables, Florida and the Norwegian Pearl cruise ship from Norwegian Cruise Line.

=== Storylines ===
Bash at the Beach featured professional wrestling matches that involved different wrestlers from pre-existing scripted feuds and storylines. Wrestlers portrayed heroes, villains, or less distinguishable characters in scripted events that built tension and culminated in a wrestling match or series of matches. Storylines were produced on AEW's weekly television program, Dynamite, the supplementary online streaming show, Dark, and The Young Bucks' YouTube series Being The Elite.

== Reception ==
=== Television ratings ===
Bash at the Beach averaged 940,000 television viewers on TNT and a 0.38 rating in AEW's key demographic.

== Aftermath ==
Although AEW went ahead and held Bash at the Beach, the trademark that Cody Rhodes had filed was officially denied in August 2020. By November of that year, a settlement was reached between Cody and WWE in which Cody gained the "Cody Rhodes" trademark, which WWE had held onto after his run in that company, in exchange for WWE gaining the WCW event name trademarks that Cody had claimed, including Bash at the Beach. As a result, in 2021, AEW established Beach Break to replace Bash at the Beach as their annual midwinter beach-themed event.

== Results ==
Night 1: January 15
No.	Results	Stipulations	Times
1	The Elite (Adam Page and Kenny Omega tag team) defeated The Young Bucks (Matt Jackson and Nick Jackson), The Inner Circle (Santana and Ortiz), and Best Friends (Chuck Taylor and Trent?) (with Orange Cassidy)	Four-way tag team match Winning team faced SoCal Uncensored for the AEW World Tag Team Championship	17:06
2	Hikaru Shida and Kris Statlander defeated The Nightmare Collective (Brandi Rhodes and Mel) (with Luther)	Tag team match	12:15
3	Jon Moxley defeated Sammy Guevara by submission	Tournament Semifinals to determine the #1 contender for the AEW World Championship at Revolution	10:02
4	MJF, The Butcher and the Blade (with The Bunny and Wardlow) defeated Diamond Dallas Page, Dustin Rhodes, and Q. T. Marshall	Six-man tag team match	10:10
5	Pac defeated Darby Allin	Tournament Semifinals to determine the #1 contender for the AEW World Championship at Revolution	11:42

Night 2: January 21
No.	Results	Stipulations	Times
1	Kenny Omega and Adam Page defeated SoCal Uncensored (Frankie Kazarian and Scorpio Sky) (c) (with Christopher Daniels)	Tag team match for the AEW World Tag Team Championship	19:20
2	Britt Baker defeated Priscilla Kelly by submission	Singles match	6:10
3	The Inner Circle (Chris Jericho, Ortiz and Santana) (with Jake Hager) defeated Jurassic Express (Jungle Boy, Luchasaurus and Marko Stunt)	Six-man tag team match	14:20
4	Maxwell Jacob Friedman defeated Joey Janela	Singles match	7:45
5	Jon Moxley defeated Pac	Tournament Final to determine the #1 contender for the AEW World Championship at Revolution	17:20
(c) / – the champion(s) heading into the match

=== AEW World Championship #1 Contender Tournament ===
Semifinals; AEW Bash at the Beach (January 15)
4	Pac	Pin
Darby Allin	11:42
5	Sammy Guevara	10:02
1	Jon Moxley	Sub

Final; Chris Jericho's Rock 'N' Wrestling Rager at Sea (January 22); Taped January 21
2	Pac	17:20
1	Jon Moxley	Pin

== See also ==
- 2020 in professional wrestling
