= Private Party (professional wrestling) =

Professional wrestling tag team

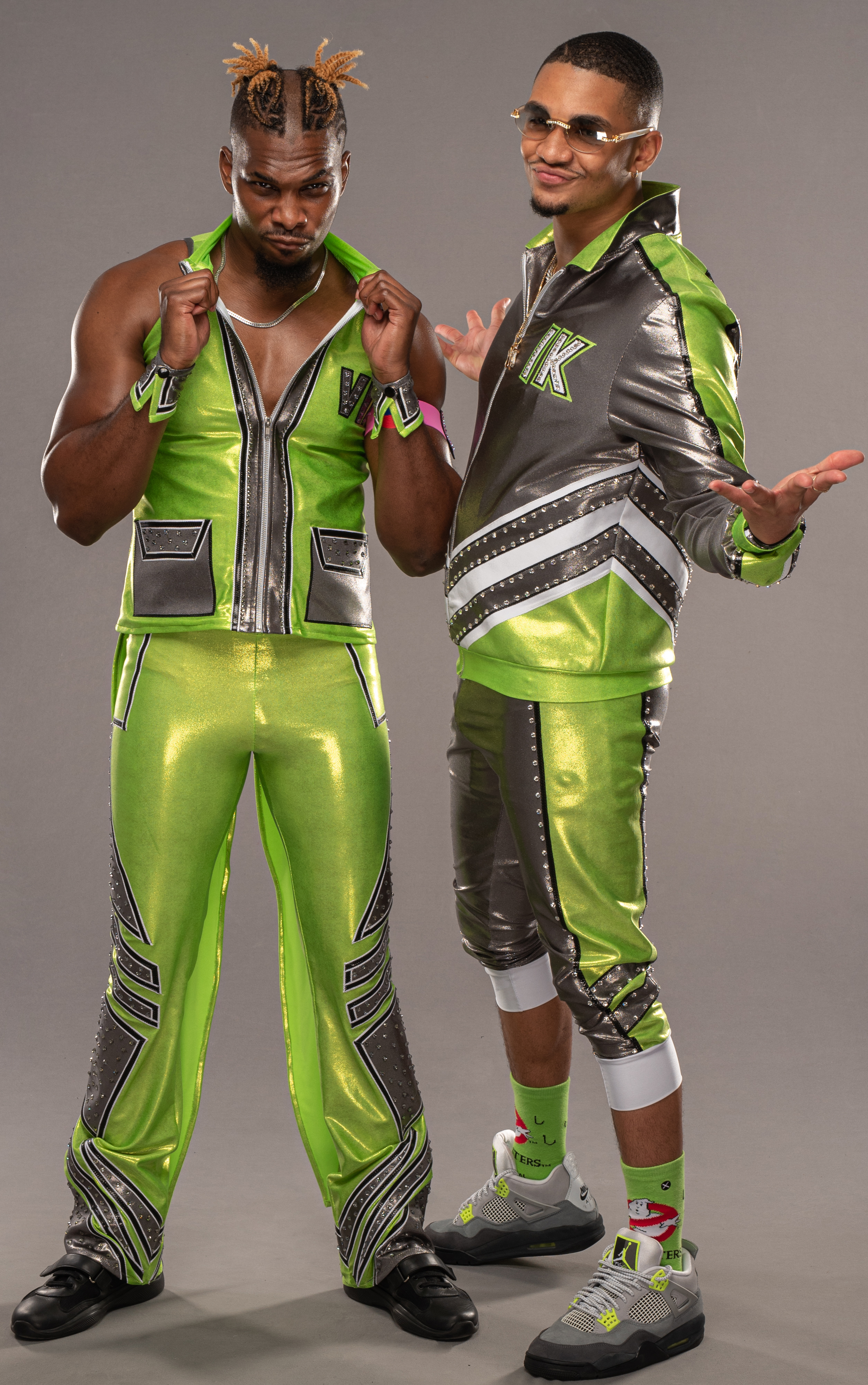
- Quen (left) and Kassidy (right) in 2020

Tag team
- Members: Isiah Kassidy/Brother Zay/Zay; Marq Quen/Quen
- Name: Private Party
- Billed heights: Zay: 6 ft 0 in (1.83 m); Quen: 5 ft 10 in (1.78 m)
- Combined billed weight: 355 lb (161 kg); Zay: 180 lb (82 kg); Quen: 175 lb (79 kg)
- Hometown: New York City, U.S.
- Billed from: "A location where you need an invitation" Brooklyn, New York
- Former members: Matt Hardy (Manager)
- Debut: August 21, 2015
- Years active: 2015–present
- Trained by: House of Glory; The Amazing Red; Brian XL

Private Party are an American professional wrestling tag team consisting of Isiah "Zay" Kassidy (born July 10, 1997) and Marq Quen (born April 12, 1994). As of April 2019, they are signed to All Elite Wrestling (AEW), where they are former AEW World Tag Team Champions. The team debuted in August 2015 and wrestled on the independent circuit, as well as several regional promotions such as House of Glory (HOG) and Combat Zone Wrestling (CZW) before signing with AEW.

== History ==
=== Independent circuit (2015–2019) ===
Private Party made their debut for House of Glory (HOG) on August 21, 2015, where they defeated Josh Glide and TJ Marconi. In December of that year, they won the HOG Tag Team Championship. They lost the titles to The Hardy Boyz in August 2016. The team would later win several other championships, including the Fight The World Tag Team Championship, the Game Changer Wrestling Tag Team Championship, the Pro Wrestling Magic Tag Team Championship and the Warriors of Wrestling Tag Team Championship. Private Party also made several appearances for Combat Zone Wrestling (CZW) and New York Wrestling Connection (NYWC) between 2016 and 2018.

=== All Elite Wrestling (2019–present) ===
On April 22, 2019, it was announced that Private Party had signed with All Elite Wrestling (AEW). The team made their AEW debut at Fyter Fest on June 29, where they lost to Best Friends (Chuck Taylor and Trent Beretta) in a triple threat tag team match also involving SoCal Uncensored (Frankie Kazarian and Scorpio Sky). On the All Out pre-show on August 31, Private Party defeated The Hybrid 2 (Angélico and Jack Evans). Private Party then competed in a tournament to determine the inaugural AEW World Tag Team Champions, defeating The Young Bucks (Matt and Nick Jackson) in the first round, but ultimately lost to the Lucha Brothers (Pentagón Jr. and Fénix) in the semi-finals. At Full Gear on November 9, Private Party failed to win the AEW Tag Team titles from SoCal Uncensored in a triple threat tag team match also involving the Lucha Brothers.

On January 8, 2020, Private Party faced the AEW World Tag Team Champions Kenny Omega and "Hangman" Adam Page in a losing effort after an altercation between Page, Kassidy and Quen. On March 12, Private Party teamed up with Joey Janela where they lost to Pac and The Lucha Brothers, otherwise known as "The Death Triangle" in a six-man tag team match. Janela, Kassidy, and Quen then suffered a post match attack until Best Friends and Orange Cassidy made the save. At the Double or Nothing Buy-In, Private Party faced Best Friends in a number one contender's match for the AEW World Tag Team Championship in a losing effort. On the June 10 episode of Dynamite, Quen challenged Cody for the TNT Championship in a losing effort. At Fyter Fest Night 1, Private Party, being accompanied by Matt Hardy, took on Santana and Ortiz, where they emerged victorious. They faced Kenny Omega and "Hangman" Adam Page in an AEW World Tag Team Championship match on Night 2 of Fyter Fest, which they lost against the champions during the event. Private Party along with Matt Hardy would turn heel after they attacked Top Flight & Matt Sydal after they won against them.

Kassidy would lose to a debuting Keith Lee on the February 9, 2022 episode of Dynamite in a "Face of the Revolution" ladder match for Revolution. At Revolution, Hardy and Kassidy would lose a Tornado tag team match with Andrade El Idolo against Sammy Guevara, Darby Allin, and Sting. Private Party would spend the rest of the year competing in various tag matches on Dark, Dark: Elevation, and Rampage.

In 2023, Quen would suffer an injury that would keep him out of action for the rest of the year. During Quen's hiatus, Kassidy remained aligned with Hardy and changed his ring name to "Brother Zay". During this time, both Zay and Hardy would turn face, align with Hardy's brother Jeff Hardy and Hook to feud with The Firm (Lee Moriatry, Ethan Page, Big Bill, and Stokely Hathaway), leading into Kassidy, The Hardys, and Hook defating The Firm in a Hardy Compound Match.

On the January 3, 2024 episode of Dynamite, Quen returned from his injury and Zay reverted back to his "Isiah Kassidy" name, reuniting Private Party in the process. While they were defeated at WrestleDream by The Young Bucks for the AEW World Tag Team Championship, Kassidy and Quen were successful in the rematch at Fright Night Dynamite on October 30 to win the titles. They had previously agreed to split the team had they lost another match. Private Party held the titles for 84 days until they lost them on the January 22, 2025 episode of Dynamite to The Hurt Syndicate (Bobby Lashley and Shelton Benjamin).

On the February 11, 2026 episode of Dynamite, Private Party returned after over a year off television in a three-way tag team match for an AEW World Tag Team Championship match, which was won by The Young Bucks. Over the following months, both members of Private Party would suffer injuries and would be out of action.

=== Impact Wrestling (2021) ===
On January 19, 2021, Private Party made their Impact Wrestling debut, and defeated Chris Sabin and James Storm to earn a shot against The Good Brothers for the Impact World Tag Team Championship at No Surrender. At No Surrender on February 13, Private Party were unsuccessful.

== Personal lives ==
Isiah Kassidy was born on July 10, 1997, in New York City. Marq Quen was born as DaQuentin Redden on April 12, 1994, also in New York City.

== Championships and accomplishments ==
- All Elite Wrestling
  - AEW World Tag Team Championship (1 time)
- Fight The World Wrestling
  - FTW World Tag Team Championship (1 time)
- Game Changer Wrestling
  - GCW Tag Team Championship (1 time)
- House of Glory
  - HOG Tag Team Championship (1 time)
- Pro Wrestling Illustrated
  - Ranked Marq No. 185 of the top 500 singles wrestlers in the PWI 500 in 2020
  - Ranked Isiah No. 187 of the top 500 singles wrestlers in the PWI 500 in 2020
  - Ranked No. 19 of the top 50 tag teams in the PWI Tag Team 50 in 2020
- Pro Wrestling Magic
  - PWM Tag Team Championship (1 time)
  - Donald Cassamento Memorial Tag Team Tournament (2017)
- Warriors of Wrestling
  - WOW Tag Team Championship (1 time)
