= Holiday Bash (2025) =

All Elite Wrestling two-part television special

- Promotion: All Elite Wrestling
- Date: December 17, 2025 (aired December 17 and 20, 2025)
- City: Manchester, England, United Kingdom
- Venue: Co-op Live
- Attendance: 10,859

Holiday Bash chronology
← Previous; 2024	Next → —

AEW Dynamite special episodes chronology
← Previous; Winter Is Coming	Next → Dynamite on 34th Street

AEW Collision special episodes chronology
← Previous; Winter Is Coming	Next → Christmas Collision

AEW in the United Kingdom chronology
← Previous; Stocking Stuffer	Next → All In

The 2025 Holiday Bash was a two-part professional wrestling television special produced by the American company All Elite Wrestling (AEW). The event took place on December 17, 2025. The special consisted of a two-hour episode of Dynamite and two one-hour episodes of Collision which would air on December 17, 2025, and December 20, 2025, respectively and would be simulcasted on TBS, TNT, and HBO Max.

== Production ==
=== Background ===
Holiday Bash is an annual professional wrestling Christmas television special produced by All Elite Wrestling (AEW) since 2020. While the original event only aired as a special episode of AEW's flagship program, Wednesday Night Dynamite, the 2021 event expanded it to a two-part event, with the second part airing as a special episode of Friday Night Rampage (although in 2021, Rampage aired on Saturday instead of its usual Friday slot). The 2023 event was then expanded to a three-part event, with the third night airing as a special episode of Saturday Night Collision, AEW's third weekly program that launched in June 2023.

On August 24, 2025, AEW announced that they would return to the United Kingdom on December 13 and 17 with December 17 being AEW's debut in Manchester. More information would be revealed that Holiday Bash would return in 2025 and would be taped in three parts in Manchester at Co-op Live as special episodes of Dynamite and Collision.

=== Storylines ===
Holiday Bash featured 12 professional wrestling matches, evenly divided across its three broadcasts, that involved different wrestlers from pre-existing scripted feuds and storylines. Storylines were produced on AEW's weekly television programs, Dynamite and Collision.

== Results ==
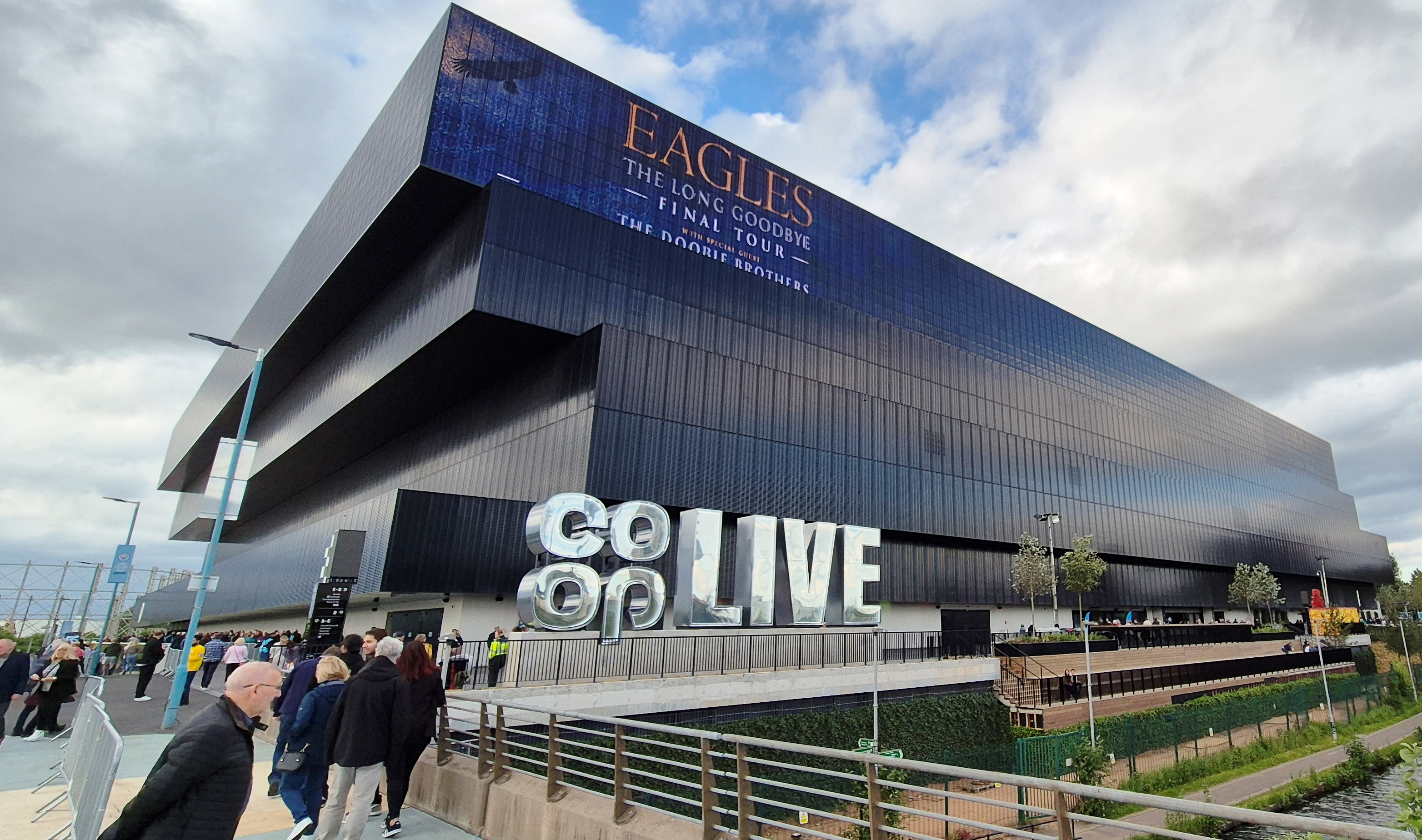
The 2025 Holiday Bash special was held at Co-op Live in Manchester, England.

Dynamite (aired December 17)
No.	Results	Stipulations	Times
1	Jon Moxley defeated Roderick Strong	Continental Classic Blue League Match	18:10
2	The Elite (Kenny Omega, Matt Jackson, and Nick Jackson) defeated Don Callis Family (Hechicero, Kazuchika Okada & Konosuke Takeshita)	$1,000,000 Trios match The winners received a $1,000,000 cash prize.	22:31
3	Athena, Mercedes Mone, and The MegaProblems (Marina Shafir and Megan Bayne) defeated Babes of Wrath (Harley Cameron and Willow Nightingale) and Timeless Love Bombs (Mina Shirakawa and Toni Storm)	Eight-woman tag team match	9:24
4	PAC defeated Kyle Fletcher	Continental Classic Gold League match	14:54
5	Bandido and Ricochet defeated Ace Austin, Anthony Bowens, Bishop Kaun, Brody King, Josh Alexander, Luchasaurus, Mark Davis, Max Caster, Shelton Benjamin, and Toa Liona	Battle royal for the Dynamite Diamond Ring	11:03

Collision (aired December 17)
No.	Results	Stipulations	Times
1	Orange Cassidy defeated Máscara Dorada	Continental Classic Blue League match	11:12
2	Jamie Hayter defeated Isla Dawn	Singles match	6:46
3	FTR (Cash Wheeler and Dax Harwood) (c) defeated Bang Bang Gang (Austin Gunn and Juice Robinson)	Tag team match for the AEW World Tag Team Championship	8:42
(c) / – the champion(s) heading into the match

Collision (aired December 20)
No.	Results	Stipulations	Times
1	Jack Perry defeated Mike Bailey	Continental Classic Gold League match	12:41
2	Eddie Kingston defeated Nathan Cruz	Singles match	1:48
3	Alex Windsor defeated Mercedes Mone (c)	Singles match for the RevPro Undisputed British Women's Championship	8:42
4	Kevin Knight defeated Kazuchika Okada	Continental Classic Gold League match	13:53
(c) / – the champion(s) heading into the match
