= Winter Is Coming (2025) =

All Elite Wrestling two-part television special

- Promotional poster for the Dynamite broadcast featuring Darby Allin, Willow Nightingale, and Jon Moxley
- Promotion: All Elite Wrestling
- Date: December 10 and 13, 2025
- City: College Park, Georgia (Dec. 10); Cardiff, Wales, United Kingdom (Dec. 13)
- Venue: Gateway Center Arena (College Park); Utilita Arena (Cardiff)
- Attendance: 3,012 (Dynamite); 4,106 (Collision)

Event chronology
← Previous; 2024	Next → —

AEW Dynamite special episodes chronology
← Previous; Thanksgiving Eve Dynamite	Next → Holiday Bash

AEW Collision special episodes chronology
← Previous; AEW Collision Thanksgiving (2025)	Next → AEW Holiday Bash

AEW in the United Kingdom chronology
← Previous; Forbidden Door	Next → Stocking Stuffer

The 2025 Winter Is Coming was a two-part professional wrestling television special produced by the American company All Elite Wrestling (AEW). It was the sixth annual Winter Is Coming and took place on December 10 and 13, 2025, at the Gateway Center Arena in College Park, Georgia, United States, and the Utilita Arena in Cardiff, Wales, United Kingdom, respectively, encompassing the respective broadcasts of Wednesday Night Dynamite and Saturday Night Collision. Dynamite aired live on TBS on December 10 while Collision aired on tape delay on TNT on December 13, with both programs simulcast on HBO Max, marking the first Winter Is Coming to stream on HBO Max.

Ten matches were contested at the event, evenly divided between the two broadcasts; the second night also had three additional dark matches taped for a special one-night only episode of Dark titled "Stocking Stiffer". In the main event of Dynamite, Samoa Joe defeated Eddie Kingston to retain the AEW World Championship. This broadcast also saw the crowning of the inaugural AEW Women's World Tag Team Champions, in which The Babes of Wrath (Harley Cameron and Willow Nightingale) defeated Timeless Love Bombs ("Timeless" Toni Storm and Mina Shirakawa) in a tournament final. In the main event of Collision, Mark Briscoe defeated Daniel Garcia to retain the AEW TNT Championship. This broadcast also marked the first edition of the event to be held outside the United States.

== Production ==
=== Background ===
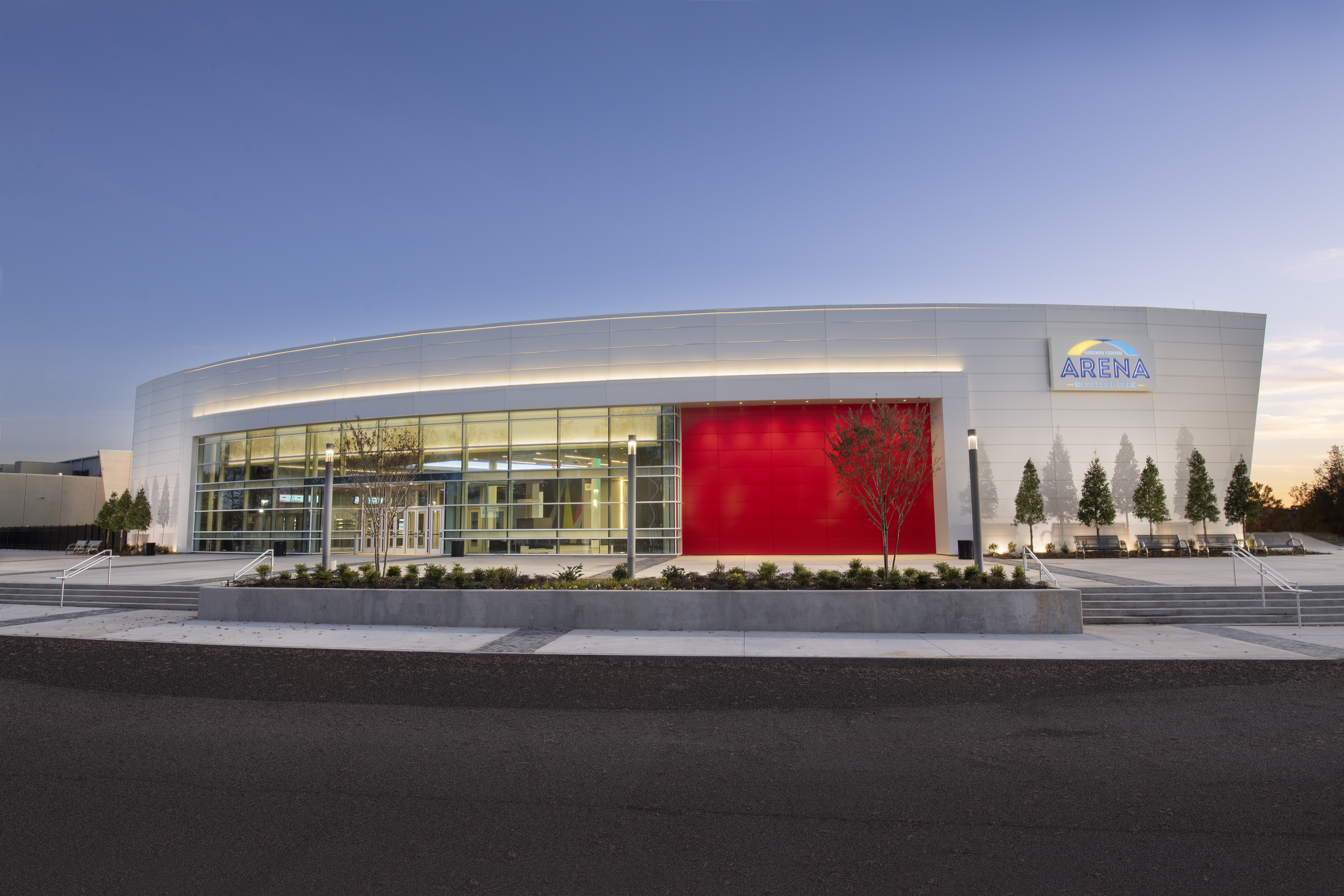
The 2025 Winter Is Coming special of Dynamite was held at Gateway Center Arena in College Park, Georgia.

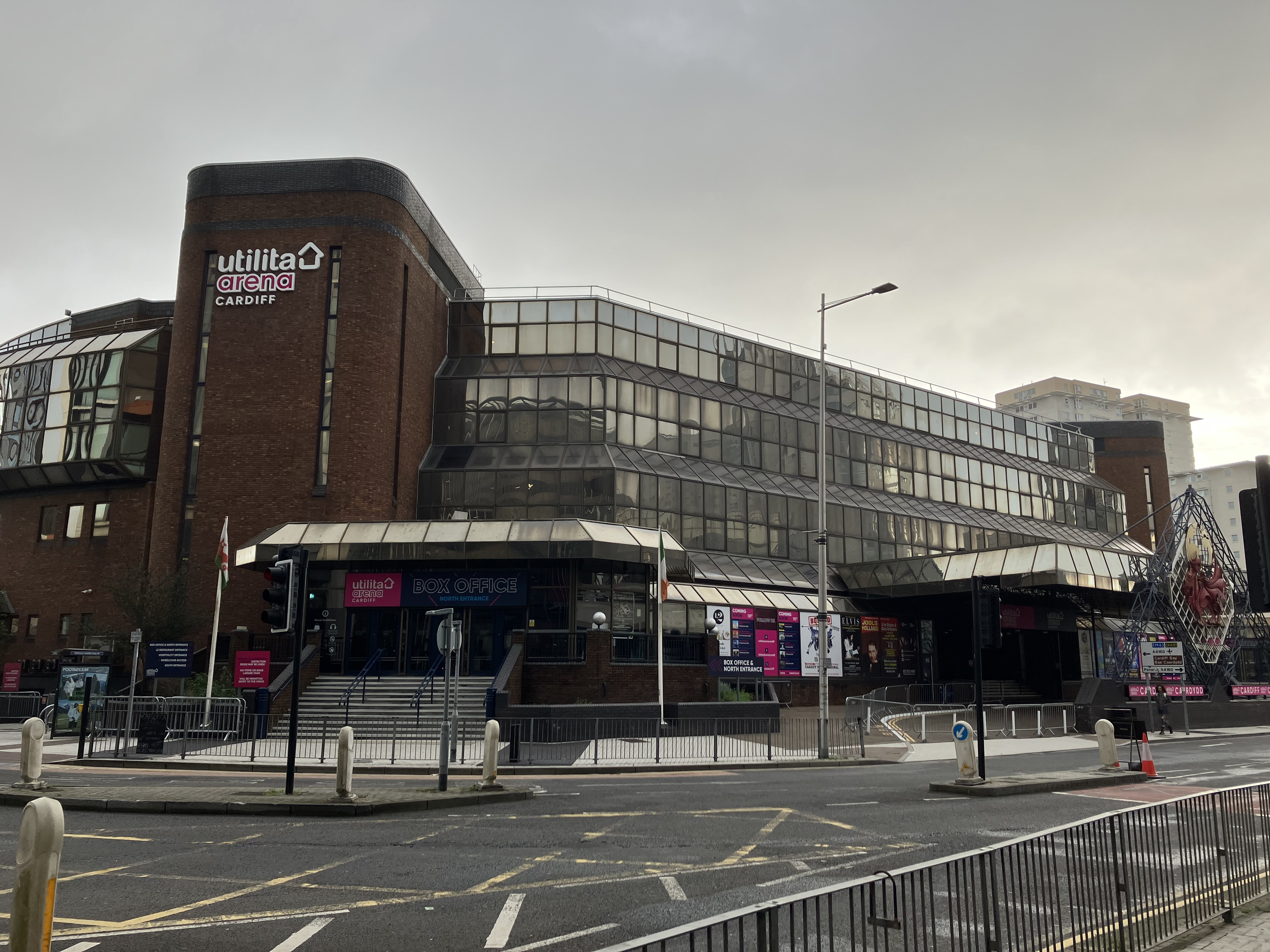
The 2025 Winter Is Coming special of Collision was held at Utilita Arena in Cardiff, Wales, United Kingdom, marking the first Winter Is Coming to be held outside the United States.

Winter Is Coming is an annual professional wrestling television special held in December by the American company All Elite Wrestling (AEW) since 2020. The title "Winter Is Coming" is derived from Game of Thrones, a television series from HBO, which is part of Warner Bros. Discovery (WBD), which also includes AEW broadcast partners TBS and TNT.

On November 24, 2025, it was announced that the sixth Winter Is Coming would be held on December 10, 2025, at the Gateway Center Arena in College Park, Georgia and air live as Wednesday Night Dynamite, simulcast on TBS and HBO Max. It was later revealed that the special would also encompass Saturday Night Collision, held at Utilita Arena in Cardiff, Wales, United Kingdom on December 13, simulcast live on TNT and HBO Max. The Collision broadcast marked the first Winter Is Coming special to be held outside the United States. This also reduced Winter Is Coming to a two-part special as the prior two years had aired in three parts including Friday Night Rampage, which was canceled at the end of 2024. This also marked the first Winter Is Coming to stream on HBO Max, following AEW's updated broadcast deal with WBD that began earlier that year in January. Just prior to the live taping of Collision, AEW president Tony Khan announced a one-night only return of AEW's former YouTube program Dark as a special holiday episode titled "Stocking Stuffer", with three dark matches taped after the live broadcast for the special that aired on December 16.

=== Storylines ===
Winter Is Coming featured 10 professional wrestling matches, evenly divided across its two broadcasts, that involved different wrestlers from pre-existing scripted feuds and storylines. Storylines were produced on AEW's weekly television programs, Dynamite and Collision.

== Results ==
Dynamite (aired live on December 10)
No.	Results	Stipulations	Times
1	The Babes of Wrath (Harley Cameron and Willow Nightingale) defeated Timeless Love Bombs ("Timeless" Toni Storm and Mina Shirakawa) by pinfall	Tournament final tag team match for the inaugural AEW Women's World Tag Team Championship	13:52
2	Kazuchika Okada defeated "Jungle" Jack Perry by pinfall	AEW Continental Classic Gold League match	13:14
3	"Hangman" Adam Page and Swerve Strickland (with Prince Nana) defeated The Opps (Katsuyori Shibata and Powerhouse Hobbs) by pinfall	Tornado tag team match	7:11
4	"Speedball" Mike Bailey defeated Kyle Fletcher by pinfall	AEW Continental Classic Gold League match	19:31
5	Samoa Joe (c) (with Hook) defeated Eddie Kingston by submission	Singles match for the AEW World Championship	13:02
(c) / – the champion(s) heading into the match

Collision (aired on tape delay on December 13)
No.	Results	Stipulations	Times
1	Swerve Strickland defeated Josh Alexander by pinfall	Singles match	13:25
2	Kris Statlander and Jamie Hayter defeated Sisters of Sin (Julia Hart and Skye Blue) by pinfall	Tag team match	10:15
3	Claudio Castagnoli vs. Konosuke Takeshita ended in a time limit draw	AEW Continental Classic Blue League match	20:00
4	"Speedball" Mike Bailey defeated Kevin Knight by pinfall	AEW Continental Classic Gold League match	13:00
5	Mark Briscoe (c) defeated Daniel Garcia by pinfall	Singles match for the AEW TNT Championship	15:05
(c) / – the champion(s) heading into the match

=== Inaugural AEW Women's World Tag Team Championship Tournament ===
1st Round; Fright Night Dynamite; October 29, 2025; Dynamite; November 5–19, 2025; Collision; November 19, 2025
Queen Aminata and Jamie Hayter (Note: Aminata and Hayter won a four-way tag team match on the October 22, 2025, episode of Dynamite to earn the right to select their first round opponents.)	10:00
Sisters of Sin (Julia Hart and Skye Blue)	Pinfall
The Babes of Wrath (Harley Cameron and Willow Nightingale)	Pinfall
Mercedes Moné and Athena	12:33
Alex Windsor and Riho	12:54
Timeless Love Bombs ("Timeless" Toni Storm and Mina Shirakawa)	Pinfall
Megan Bayne and Marina Shafir (Note: Shafir replaced Penelope Ford as Bayne's partner due to injury.)	Submission
TayJay (Tay Melo and Anna Jay)	9:05

Semifinals; Dynamite: Thanksgiving Eve; November 26, 2025; Dynamite; December 3, 2025
Sisters of Sin	11:43
The Babes of Wrath	Pinfall
Timeless Love Bombs (Note: Timeless Love Bombs won a four-way tag team match against the other semifinalists at Full Gear to earn the right to select the stipulation for their semifinals match. They chose to have a Hardcore Holiday Deathmatch.)	Pinfall
Megan Bayne and Marina Shafir	10:10

Final; Dynamite: Winter Is Coming; December 10, 2025
The Babes of Wrath	Pinfall
Timeless Love Bombs	13:52
