= AEW Stocking Stuffer =

2025 All Elite Wrestling television special

Stocking Stuffer
- Promotion: All Elite Wrestling
- Date: December 13, 2025 (aired December 16, 2025)
- City: Cardiff, Wales
- Venue: Utilita Arena Cardiff
- Attendance: 4,106

AEW in the United Kingdom chronology
← Previous; Winter is Coming	Next → Holiday Bash

Stocking Stuffer was a professional wrestling television special produced by All Elite Wrestling (AEW). It took place at Utilita Arena Cardiff in Cardiff, Wales on December 13, 2025 and aired on tape delay on December 16, 2025 as a special one-off episode of Dark on YouTube.

== Production ==
=== Background ===
On October 2, 2019, All Elite Wrestling's (AEW) flagship professional wrestling television program, Dynamite, premiered on TNT. During the event, there were four dark matches, two before and two after the live broadcast. During the media scrum following this event, AEW President and Chief Executive Officer Tony Khan stated that the dark matches would become available to view on video in some form. On October 5, then-AEW Executive Vice President and wrestler Cody Rhodes announced a sister program to Dynamite called AEW Dark, which would be the home of AEW's dark matches. On October 8, the program began airing on Tuesdays at 8pm Eastern Time (ET) on AEW's YouTube channel. During the week of a pay-per-view (PPV), however, Dark would air on Friday as the go-home show; this continued until May 2021 for that year's Double or Nothing PPV. Unlike the dark matches of other wrestling promotions, which generally do not affect storylines, these matches on Dark were part of AEW's storylines and counted towards the wrestlers' match statistics.

On April 25, 2023, after relocating tapings to Universal Studios Florida on August 27, 2021, AEW aired its final episode in preparation for the premiere of AEW's third television program, Collision, which premiered on TNT in June 2023. This was due to an amended deal with AEW's broadcast partner Warner Bros. Discovery (WBD), in which all of AEW's programs would air exclusively on WBD's channels.

In July 2025 in an interview with Iridian Fierro, AEW owner Tony Khan stated that he was open to bringing back Dark and/or Elevation, but it would have to align with AEW's media strategy and television partnerships. He also said it would have to make sense to bring either back, but the ultimate decision was with Warner Bros. Discovery. While in Cardiff, Wales on December 13 that year for the live special of Collision: Winter Is Coming, Khan announced a one-night only return of Dark for a special titled "Stocking Stuffer". Three matches were taped that day for the special that streamed on YouTube on December 16.

=== Storylines ===
Fairway to Hell featured professional wrestling matches that involved different wrestlers from pre-existing feuds and storylines. Storylines were produced on AEW's weekly television programs, Dynamite and Collision.

== Results ==
No.	Results	Stipulations	Times
1	Marina Shafir defeated Isla Dawn	Singles match	5:53
2	Mascara Dorada, Orange Cassidy, and Roderick Strong defeated Lykos Gym (Kid Lykos and Kid Lykos II) and Mark Andrews	Six-man tag team match	2:17
3	Death Riders (Jon Moxley, Pac, and Wheeler Yuta) (with Daniel Garcia and Marina Shafir) defeated Grizzled Young Veterans (James Drake and Zack Gibson) and Nathan Cruz	Six-man tag team match	8:33
