= AEW Women's World Tag Team Championship =

Professional wrestling championship

- The AEW Women's World Tag Team Championship belts.

Details
- Promotion: All Elite Wrestling
- Date established: September 24, 2025
- Current champions: Wrathlander (Harley Cameron and Kris Statlander)
- Date won: November 14, 2026
Statistics
- First champions: The Babes of Wrath (Willow Nightingale and Harley Cameron)
- Most reigns: As tag team: N/A; As individual (2 reigns): Harley Cameron
- Longest reign: Divine Dominion (Megan Bayne and Lena Kross) (168 days)
- Shortest reign: The Brawling Birds (Jamie Hayter and Alex Windsor) (76 days)
- Oldest champion: Harley Cameron (32 years, 314 days)
- Youngest champion: Megan Bayne (27 years, 287 days)

The AEW Women's World Tag Team Championship is a women's professional wrestling world tag team championship created and promoted by the American promotion All Elite Wrestling (AEW). Established on September 24, 2025, the inaugural champions were The Babes of Wrath (Willow Nightingale and Harley Cameron). The current champions are Wrathlander (Harley Cameron and Kris Statlander), who are in their first reign as a team, while individually, it is Statlander's first reign and Cameron's record-setting second reign. They won the title by defeating The Brawling Birds (Jamie Hayter and Alex Windsor) at Full Gear on November 14, 2026.

== History ==
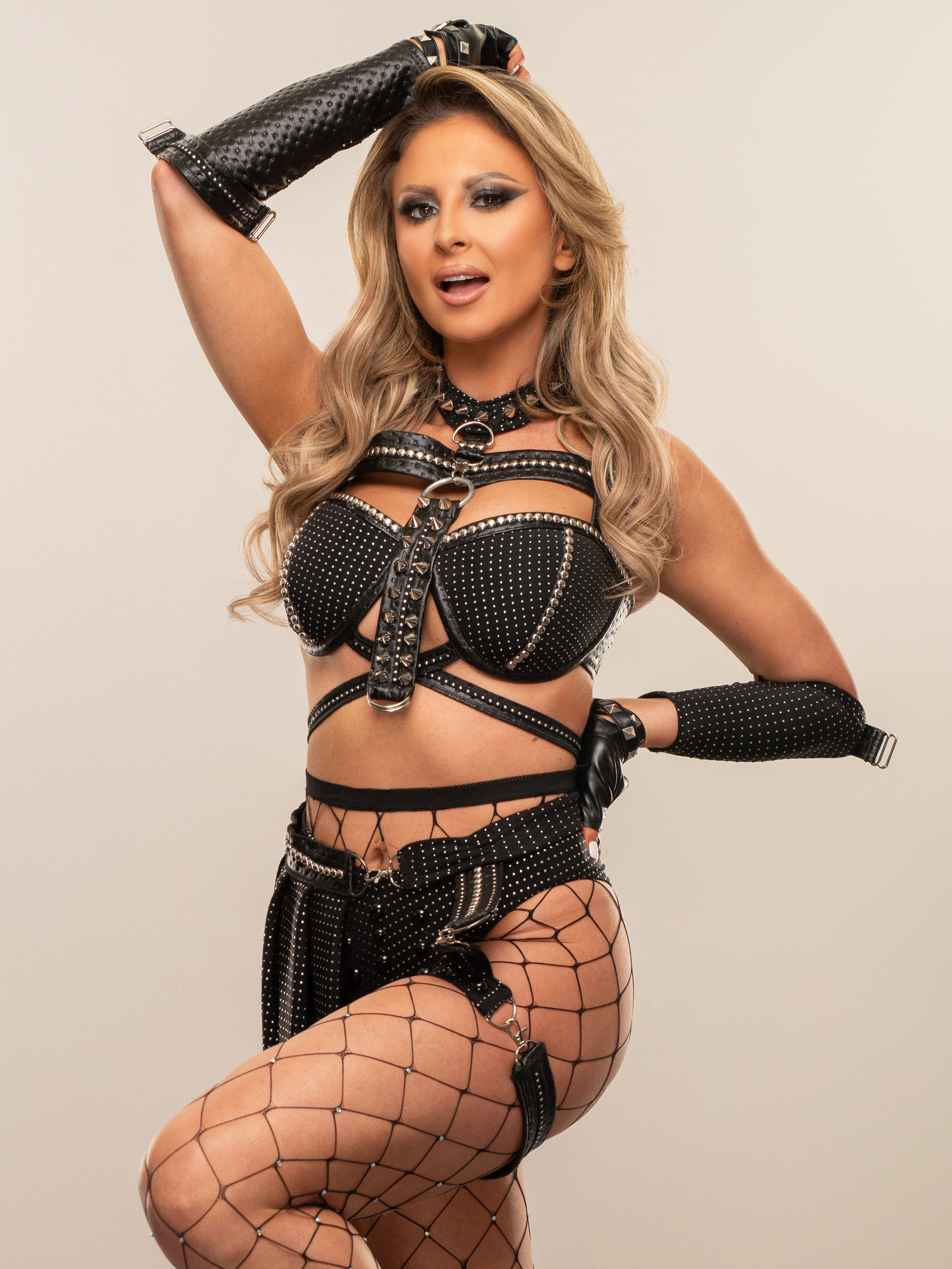
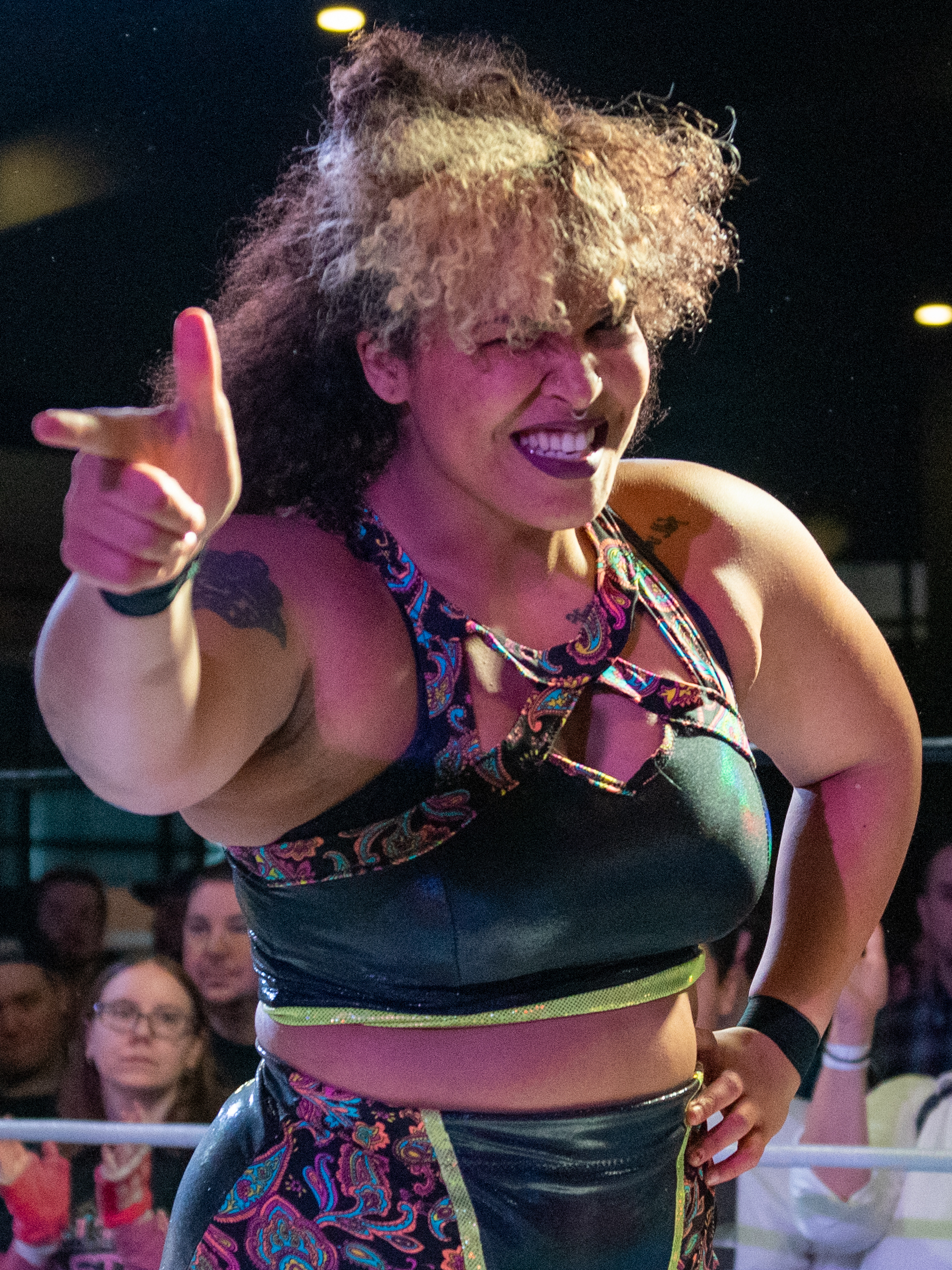
Inaugural champions The Babes of Wrath (Harley Cameron and Willow Nightingale)

On June 18, 2019, six months after the American professional wrestling promotion All Elite Wrestling (AEW) was founded, AEW President and Chief Executive Officer Tony Khan announced plans for both a singles and tag team championship for the women's division. While two singles titles were subsequently created—the AEW Women's World Championship in 2019 and the AEW TBS Championship in 2021—the tag team championship was not officially introduced until 2025. During the post-event media scrum for All In: Texas on July 12, 2025, Khan stated that he had intended to introduce the championship earlier but was delayed due to injuries within the women's roster. He further explained that he wanted to ensure greater stability within the division before launching a tag team title.

On the September 24, 2025, episode of Dynamite, Khan officially announced the AEW Women's World Tag Team Championship and that the inaugural champions would be determined via a tournament. The tournament bracket was revealed on the October 22 episode, featuring an eight-team single-elimination format that began on October 29. The tournament final took place at Dynamite: Winter Is Coming on December 10 where The Babes of Wrath (Harley Cameron and Willow Nightingale) defeated Timeless Love Bombs ("Timeless" Toni Storm and Mina Shirakawa) to become the inaugural champions.

=== Inaugural tournament ===
1st Round; Fright Night Dynamite; October 29, 2025; Dynamite; November 5–19, 2025; Collision; November 19, 2025
Queen Aminata and Jamie Hayter (Note: Aminata and Hayter won a four-way tag team match on the October 22, 2025, episode of Dynamite to earn the right to select their first round opponents.)	10:00
Sisters of Sin (Julia Hart and Skye Blue)	Pinfall
The Babes of Wrath (Harley Cameron and Willow Nightingale)	Pinfall
Mercedes Moné and Athena	12:33
Alex Windsor and Riho	12:54
Timeless Love Bombs ("Timeless" Toni Storm and Mina Shirakawa)	Pinfall
Megan Bayne and Marina Shafir (Note: Shafir replaced Penelope Ford as Bayne's partner due to injury.)	Submission
TayJay (Tay Melo and Anna Jay)	9:05

Semifinals; Dynamite: Thanksgiving Eve; November 26, 2025; Dynamite; December 3, 2025
Sisters of Sin	11:43
The Babes of Wrath	Pinfall
Timeless Love Bombs (Note: Timeless Love Bombs won a four-way tag team match against the other semifinalists at Full Gear to earn the right to select the stipulation for their semifinals match. They chose to have a Hardcore Holiday Deathmatch.)	Pinfall
Megan Bayne and Marina Shafir	10:10

Final; Dynamite: Winter Is Coming; December 10, 2025
The Babes of Wrath	Pinfall
Timeless Love Bombs	13:52

== Belt design ==
The AEW Women's World Tag Team Championship belts are identical to the men's AEW World Tag Team Championship belts, with a couple of notable differences. Below the AEW logo on the center plate is a black banner that says "WOMEN'S TAG TEAM" in gold. Unlike the men's title, the women's does not have a nameplate for the reigning champions. While the side plates on the men's depict two male wrestlers in different wrestling positions, the women's instead has women.

== Reigns ==
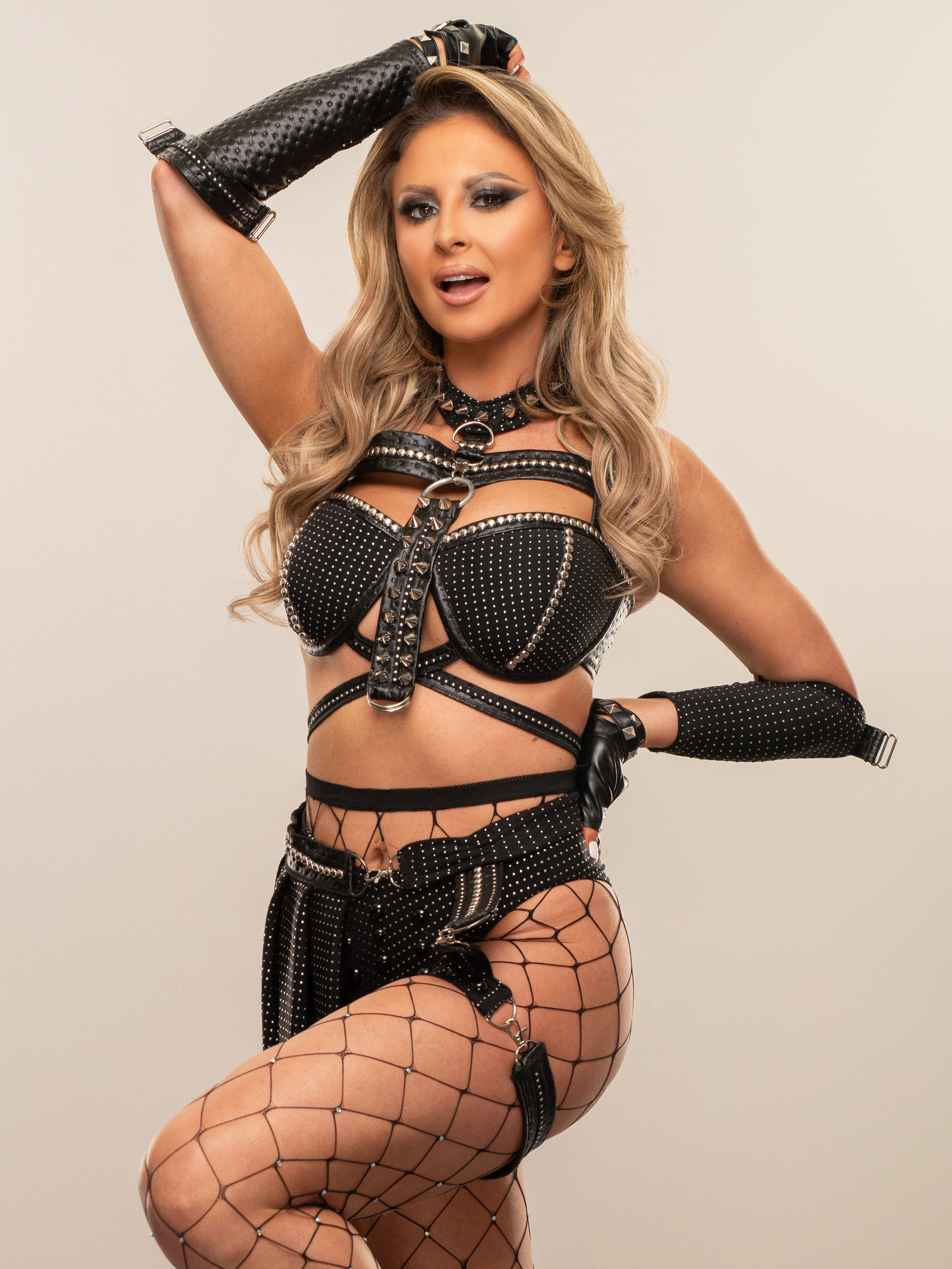
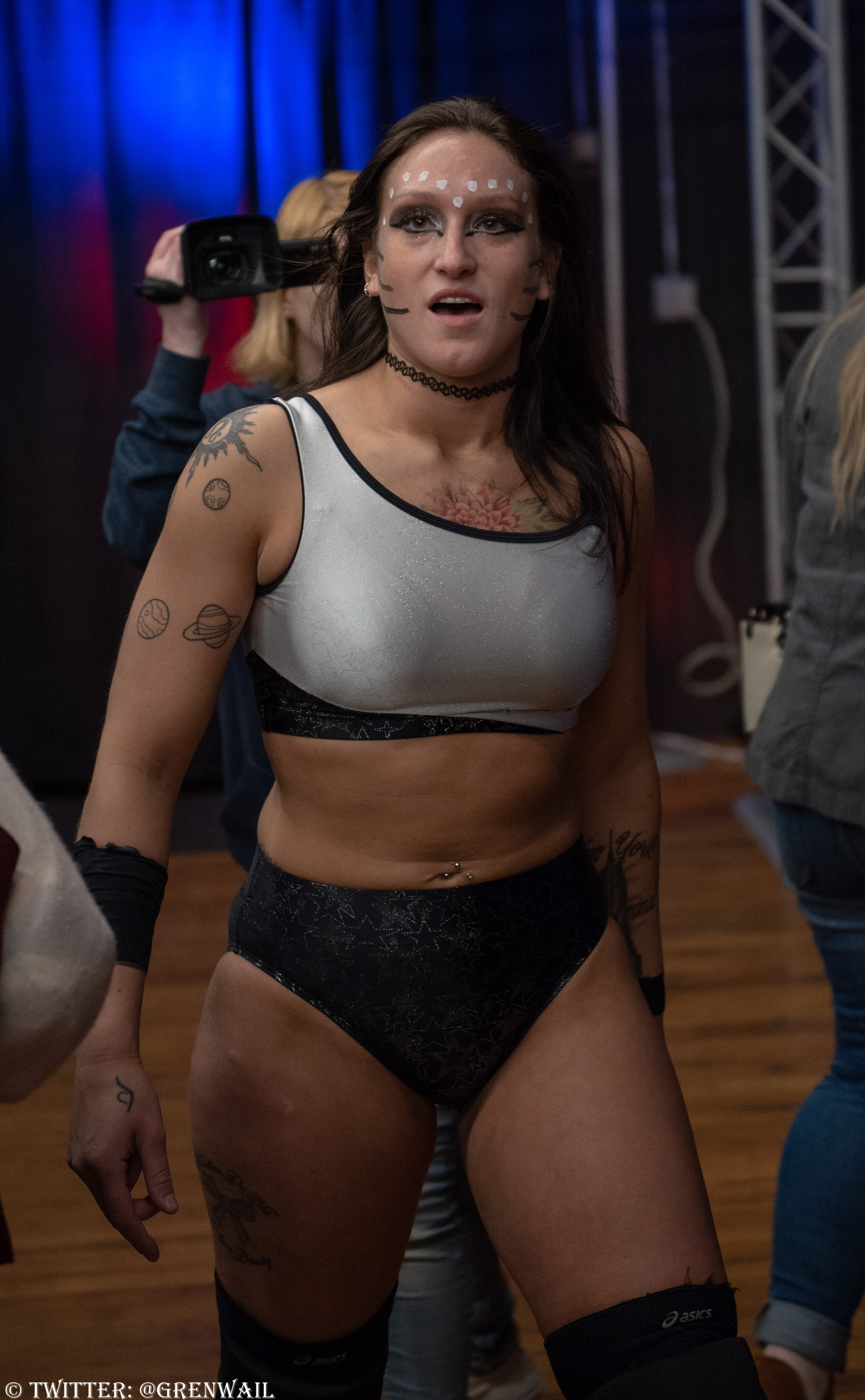
Current champions Wrathlander (Harley Cameron and Kris Statlander); this reign also made Cameron a record-setting two-time champion

As of November 19, 2026, there have been four reigns between four teams composed of seven individual champions. The inaugural champions were The Babes of Wrath (Willow Nightingale and Harley Cameron). Divine Dominion (Megan Bayne and Lena Kross) have the longest reign at 168 days, while The Brawling Birds (Jamie Hayter and Alex Windsor) have the shortest reign at 76 days. Cameron has the most reigns at two, winning the title with two different tag partners. She is also the oldest champion when she won the title for a second time at 32, while the youngest is Bayne at 27.

The current champions are Wrathlander (Harley Cameron and Kris Statlander), who are in their first reign as a team, while individually, it is Statlander's first reign and Cameron's record-setting second reign. They won the title by defeating The Brawling Birds (Jamie Hayter and Alex Windsor) at Full Gear on November 14, 2026, in Phoenix, Arizona.

Key
No.	Overall reign number
Reign	Reign number for the specific team—reign numbers for the individuals are in parentheses, if different
Days	Number of days held
+	Current reign is changing daily

No.	Champion	Championship change			Reign statistics		Notes	Ref.
No.	Champion	Date	Event	Location	Reign	Days	Notes	Ref.
1	The Babes of Wrath (Willow Nightingale and Harley Cameron)	December 10, 2025	Dynamite: Winter Is Coming	College Park, GA	1	95	Defeated Timeless Love Bombs ("Timeless" Toni Storm and Mina Shirakawa) in a tournament final to become the inaugural champions.	
2	Divine Dominion (Megan Bayne and Lena Kross)	March 15, 2026	Revolution	Los Angeles, CA	1	168		
3	The Brawling Birds (Jamie Hayter and Alex Windsor)	August 30, 2026	All In	London, England	1	76		
4	Wrathlander (Harley Cameron and Kris Statlander)	November 14, 2026	Full Gear	Phoenix, Arizona	1 (2, 1)	5+		

== Combined reigns ==
As of November 19, 2026.

Key
†	Current champion; reign changing daily
<1	Reign was less than a day

=== By team ===
Rank	Champion	No. of reigns	Combined days
1	Divine Dominion (Megan Bayne and Lena Kross)	1	168
2	Babes of Wrath (Willow Nightingale and Harley Cameron)	1	95
3	The Brawling Birds (Jamie Hayter and Alex Windsor)	1	76
4	Wrathlander (Harley Cameron and Kris Statlander)	1	5+

=== By wrestler ===
Rank	Champion	No. of reigns	Combined days
1	Megan Bayne	1	168
1	Lena Kross	1	168
3	Harley Cameron †	2	98+
4	Willow Nightingale	1	95
5	Jamie Hayter	1	81
5	Alex Windsor	1	81
7	Kris Statlander †	1	3+

== See also ==
- Women's World Tag Team Championship
