= Toni Storm =

Australian wrestler (born 1995)

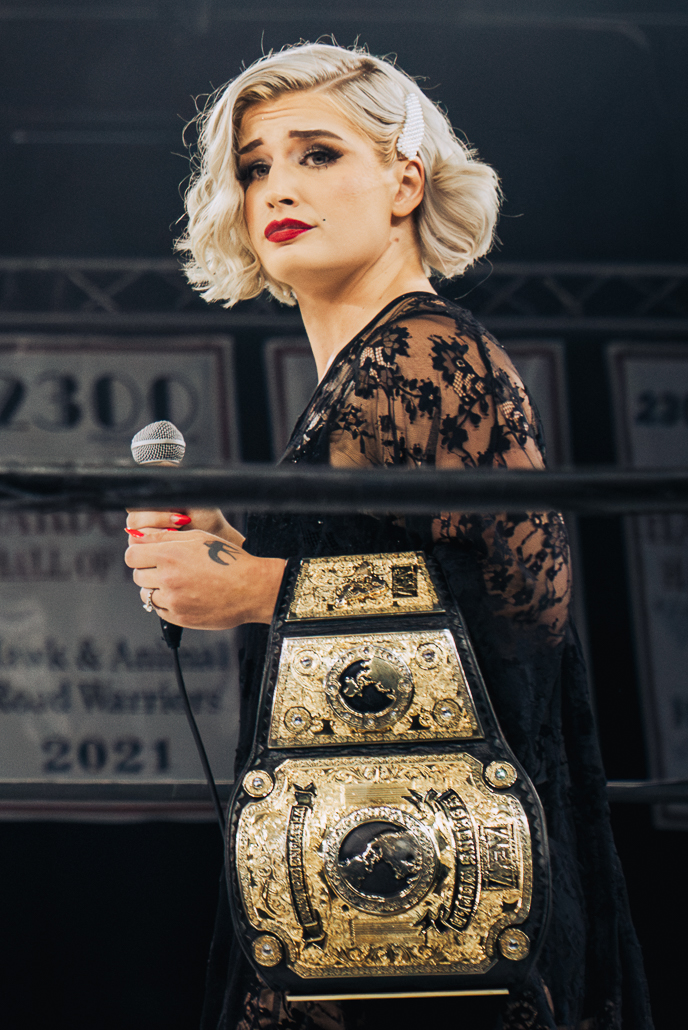
- Storm in 2024

Personal information
- Born: Toni Rossall; 19 October 1995 (age 31) Auckland, New Zealand
- Spouse: Juice Robinson (m. 2022)

Professional wrestling career
- Ring name(s): Storm; Toni Storm
- Billed height: 168 cm (5 ft 6 in)
- Billed weight: 65 kg (143 lb)
- Billed from: Gold Coast, Australia; Stage 7 at Warner Studios
- Trained by: Dean Allmark
- Debut: 9 October 2009

Toni Rossall (born 19 October 1995), better known by the ring name Toni Storm, is a New Zealand-Australian professional wrestler. As of March 2022, she is signed to All Elite Wrestling (AEW) where she performs as "Timeless" Toni Storm.

Rossall first gained attention for her work on several independent promotion, such as the Japanese promotion World Wonder Ring Stardom where she won the World of Stardom Championship and SWA World Championship for a record-setting reign of 612 days, the British promotion Progress Wrestling where she won the Progress Women's Championship and the German promotion Westside Xtreme Wrestling (wXw), where she won the wXw Women's Championship twice. She would work with WWE, winning the Mae Young Classic tournament in 2018 at WWE's first all-female pay-per-view, Evolution. She became a one-time NXT UK Women's Champion and performed on the NXT UK, NXT, and SmackDown brands before requesting her release in 2021.

After leaving WWE, Storm signed with AEW in the spring of 2022. By 2023, she would change her gimmick to that of a classic Hollywood actress, known as "Timeless" Toni Storm. She is a record-setting four-time AEW Women's World Champion.

== Early life ==
Toni Rossall was born in Auckland on 19 October 1995, and moved to Australia's Gold Coast with her mother at the age of four after her parents separated. At the age of 10, while living on the Gold Coast, she discovered WWE on television and developed an interest in professional wrestling.

== Professional wrestling career ==
=== Early career (2009–2015) ===
Rossall began training at a small Gold Coast wrestling company and debuted on 9 October 2009 when she was 13 years old. After five years of honing her skills with that company, she decided at the age of 18 that she wanted to receive further training to become a better wrestler; she got her mother's permission to move to England and live with her grandmother in Liverpool, where she trained under Dean Allmark. She then started working internationally in countries such as Finland, France, Germany, and Spain. She took part in a WWE tryout camp in Melbourne during WWE's 2014 Australian tour, and attended another tryout camp in Manchester during WWE's 2015 UK tour.

=== Progress Wrestling (2015–2018) ===
Rossall made her debut under the ring name Storm (later Toni Storm) for Progress Wrestling on 14 April 2015 in a losing effort against Elizabeth. In May 2017, she became the inaugural Progress Women's Champion after defeating Jinny and Laura Di Matteo in a three-way match. This marked the first time that female wrestlers competed in the main event of a Progress event. Throughout the year, Storm went on to successfully defend the championship numerous times against challengers like Kay Lee Ray, Laura Di Matteo and Candice LeRae. She lost the title to Jinny at Chapter 69: Be Here Now.

=== World Wonder Ring Stardom (2016–2018) ===
In 2016, Storm began working for the Japanese promotion Stardom, where she won the SWA World Championship on 24 July. On 2 October 2016, Stardom officially announced that Storm had signed with the promotion. She would hold the championship for a record-setting reign of 612 days. After winning the 2017 Cinderella Tournament on 30 April, Storm also won the 2017 5★Star GP on 18 September, becoming the first wrestler to win the two tournaments in the same year. On 24 September, Storm became the new World of Stardom Champion in an unplanned finish when Mayu Iwatani was legitimately injured during a title defense against her, prompting the referee to stop the match and award Storm the title. On 9 June 2018, Kagetsu defeated Storm in a title match, ending her reign at 258 days.

=== WWE (2017–2021) ===
On 16 June 2017, WWE announced Storm as one of the first four participants of the Mae Young Classic. Storm entered the tournament on 13 July, defeating Ayesha Raymond in the first round. The following day, Storm defeated Lacey Evans in the second round and Piper Niven in the quarterfinals, before being eliminated from the tournament in the semi-finals by Kairi Sane. On 9 May 2018, Storm was advertised for the upcoming United Kingdom Championship Tournament. On 24 May, Storm signed a WWE contract. On 18 June at the United Kingdom Championship Tournament, Storm defeated Killer Kelly and Isla Dawn in a triple threat match to become the #1 contender for the NXT Women's Championship. The following day at the NXT U.K. Championship, Storm was defeated by the defending NXT Women's Champion Shayna Baszler. Months later, she participated in the second Mae Young Classic, a tournament she won when she defeated Io Shirai at WWE Evolution.

She also participated in a tournament to crown the inaugural NXT UK Women's Champion, but she lost against Rhea Ripley. In a rematch on 12 January 2019 at NXT UK TakeOver: Blackpool, Storm defeated Ripley to win the title. She reigned as champion until 31 August 2019 at NXT UK TakeOver: Cardiff, where Storm lost her title to Kay Lee Ray, ending her reign at 230 days.

On 24 November 2019 on the TakeOver: WarGames post-show Q&A session with Triple H, Storm was announced to be a part of the NXT Women's Survivor Series team by team captain Rhea Ripley. At Survivor Series, Storm was eliminated via submission by Natalya and Sasha Banks. At NXT UK TakeOver: Blackpool II, Storm competed unsuccessfully in a triple threat match for the NXT UK Women's Championship against Kay Lee Ray and Piper Niven. Storm participated in the women's Royal Rumble match at the namesake pay-per-view and entered at No. 20 but was eliminated by Shayna Baszler. Storm wrestled her last match in the brand on 27 February 2020 episode of NXT UK, losing to Kay Lee Ray in an "I Quit" match.

After an 8-month hiatus, on 4 October 2020 at TakeOver 31, Storm returned to NXT following the NXT Women's Championship match between Io Shirai and Candice LeRae. She then joined Candice LeRae's team with Dakota Kai, and Raquel González for TakeOver: WarGames, turning heel. At Royal Rumble, she entered as #7 and was eliminated by Rhea Ripley. She then competed in a triple threat match for the NXT Women's Championship involving Mercedes Martinez and reigning champion Io Shirai at TakeOver: Vengeance Day in a losing effort. On 10 March 2021 episode of NXT, Storm challenged Shirai for the title, where she was again unsuccessful.

Storm debuted on SmackDown on 23 July episode as a face, defeating Zelina Vega. She was then defeated by Vega during the Queen's Crown tournament in the first round. She participated in the 5 on 5 Survivor Series elimination match at Survivor Series; eliminating both Carmella and Vega but was then eliminated by Liv Morgan. Storm then began a program with SmackDown Women's Champion Charlotte Flair with Storm winning their first bout via disqualification. She then received her title opportunity on the Christmas Eve edition of SmackDown in a losing effort. This would be her last televised appearance in WWE as she abruptly requested her release the following week on 29 December, which was immediately granted.

In an interview with Renee Paquette six months later, Storm said of her departure from WWE:

It was cool at one point and then it wasn't. It changed and I didn't want anything to do with it. My main goal in wrestling was to be on [WWE's main roster] and then I got there [and] realised that this is just not going to work out. [...] I abruptly quit. I woke up that morning having no idea that I was going to quit [and] it was a complicated ordeal. I had built up frustrations with the place for a very long time, like a lot of people do. They don't give a shit, so why should I? This isn't going to work. I'm not going to succeed here, I can just see it. [...] I like to think that I've been around wrestling long enough to know—I just know what's right and what's wrong for me and what I like and what I don't like, and I just didn't like it in the end. I didn't feel that appreciated. And I just felt like they, at times, didn't have very much respect for me. I feel like over time they just crushed my love for wrestling. It just wasn't even wrestling anymore. You're not even allowed to say "wrestling". I thought my whole purpose in life was to go to WWE, but then over time I realised it's just pro wrestling that I love. It's not a company that I love.

=== All Elite Wrestling (2022–present) ===
==== Debut; The Outcasts (2022–2023) ====
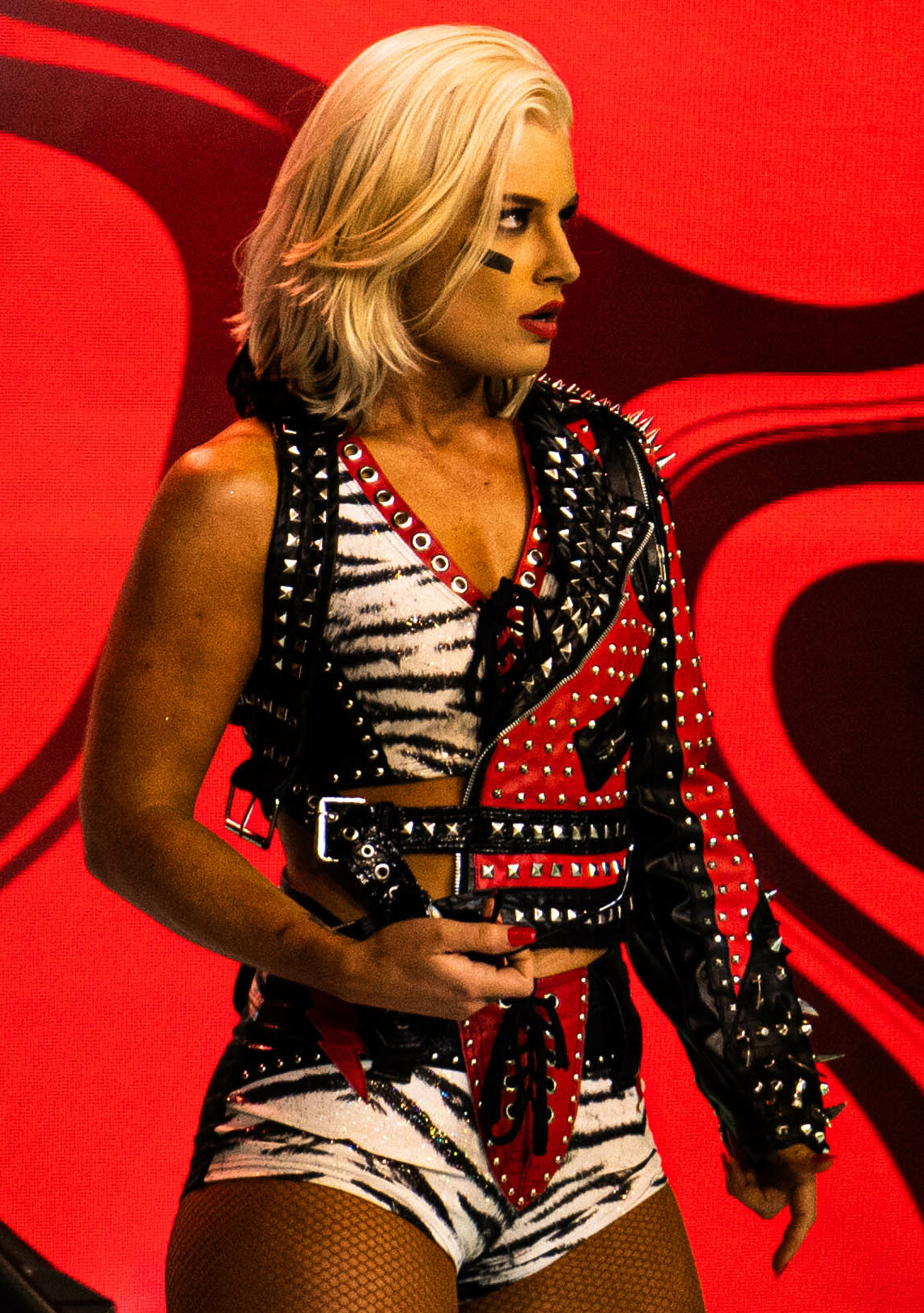
Storm at AEW x NJPW: Forbidden Door in June 2022

Storm made her AEW debut on the 30 March 2022 episode of Dynamite as a participant in the qualifier match for the Owen Hart Foundation Women's Tournament, defeating The Bunny. AEW then announced Storm signed with the company. Storm defeated Jamie Hayter in the quarterfinals of the tournament, and she was defeated by Britt Baker in the semi-finals. On Road Rager special episode of Dynamite, Storm defeated Baker in a rematch to challenge AEW Women's World Champion Thunder Rosa for the title at AEW x NJPW: Forbidden Door in a losing effort. At All Out, Storm defeated Baker, Hayter, and Hikaru Shida in a four-way match to become AEW Interim Women's World Champion. She then defended her title against Athena, Baker, and Serena Deeb at Grand Slam, against Deeb on 28 September episode of Dynamite in a lumberjack match, and against Shida at Title Tuesday. She lost her championship in a title match against Hayter at Full Gear, ending her first reign at 76 days. On the following episode of Dynamite, AEW recognized Storm's reign as a lineal champion, due to Rosa forfeiting the title, much to Toni Storm's chagrin.

On 11 January 2023 episode of Dynamite, Storm teamed with Saraya in a losing effort to Hayter and Baker. Shida accidentally assisted the opposing team with her signature kendo stick, where Baker was able to capitalize, allowing for Hayter to pin Storm for the win. The following week, Storm and Saraya turned heel as they attacked Willow Nightingale and declaring war on the AEW Women's locker room, they would also attempt to recruit Ruby Soho. At Revolution, after Hayter defeated Ruby Soho and Saraya, Soho attacked Hayter and Baker officially aligning with Storm and Saraya. On 10 March, the group became officially known as The Outcasts. Over the next month, they continued a winning streak against the homegrown talent while humiliating them with their signature branding using spray paint.

At Double or Nothing, Storm defeated Hayter to win her record-setting second AEW Women's World Championship. On the first episode of Collision on 17 June, Storm and Soho made the debut in a tag team match against Blue and NJPW Strong Women's Champion Willow Nightingale. Storm then retained her title against Nightingale at Forbidden Door. In July, Storm defeated Taya Valkyrie in a title match at Battle of the Belts VII. On 2 August episode of Dynamite 200, Storm lost the title to Hikaru Shida, ending her second reign at 66 days. Storm failed to regain the title in a four-way match involving Shida, Saraya, and Baker at All In where she got pinned by Saraya. At All Out, Storm turned on The Outcasts when she stopped Soho from using spray paint against AEW TBS Champion Kris Statlander in their title match. At Grand Slam, Storm failed to win the AEW Women's World Championship from Saraya.

==== "Timeless" (2023–present) ====
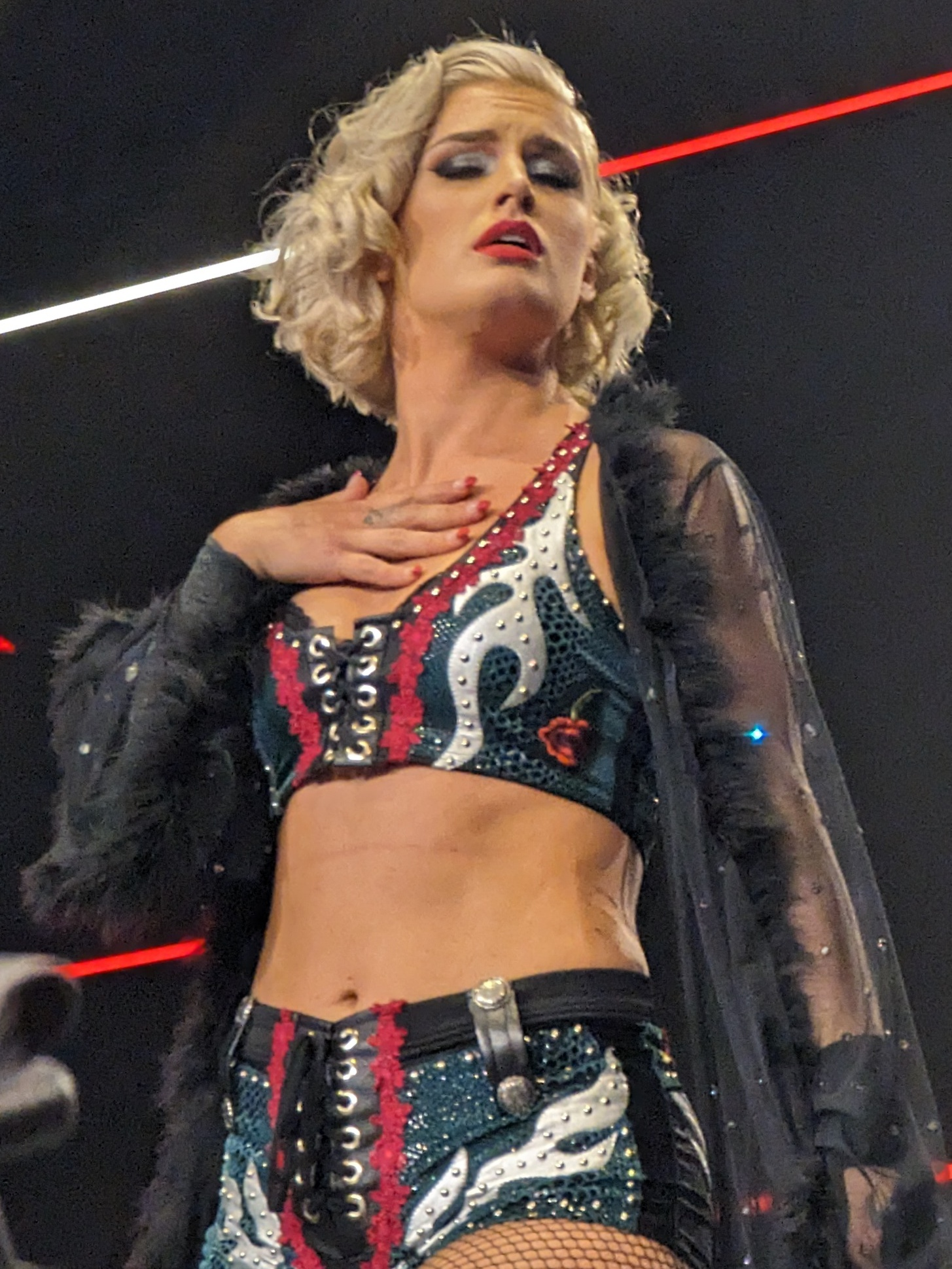
"Timeless" Toni Storm in 2023

Devastated over losing the AEW Women's World Championship to Shida, Storm's persona underwent a drastic change to that of a demanding and paranoid woman, cosplaying as a Golden Age of Hollywood starlet with the catchphrase "chin up, tits out, and watch for the shoe". She dubbed herself "Timeless" Toni Storm on the 4 October episode of Dynamite. Following the 25 October episode of Dynamite, Storm began to be accompanied in vignettes and to the ring by Luther, who serves as her personal butler. In the same episode of Dynamite, it was announced that Storm would face Shida for the AEW Women's World Championship at Full Gear. In the shows that followed after the announcement, Storm began appearing after Shida's matches in attempts to steal Shida's spotlight, to Shida's initial confusion and later annoyance; Shida attacked Storm after one such attempt. On the 8 November episode of Dynamite, the debuting Mariah May was introduced as an obsessive fan of Storm. In the following months, Storm adopted May as an "understudy" and protégé. At Full Gear on 18 November, Storm defeated Shida to win the AEW Women's World Championship for a record-tying third time. On 30 December at Worlds End, Storm successfully defended the AEW Women's World Championship against Riho.

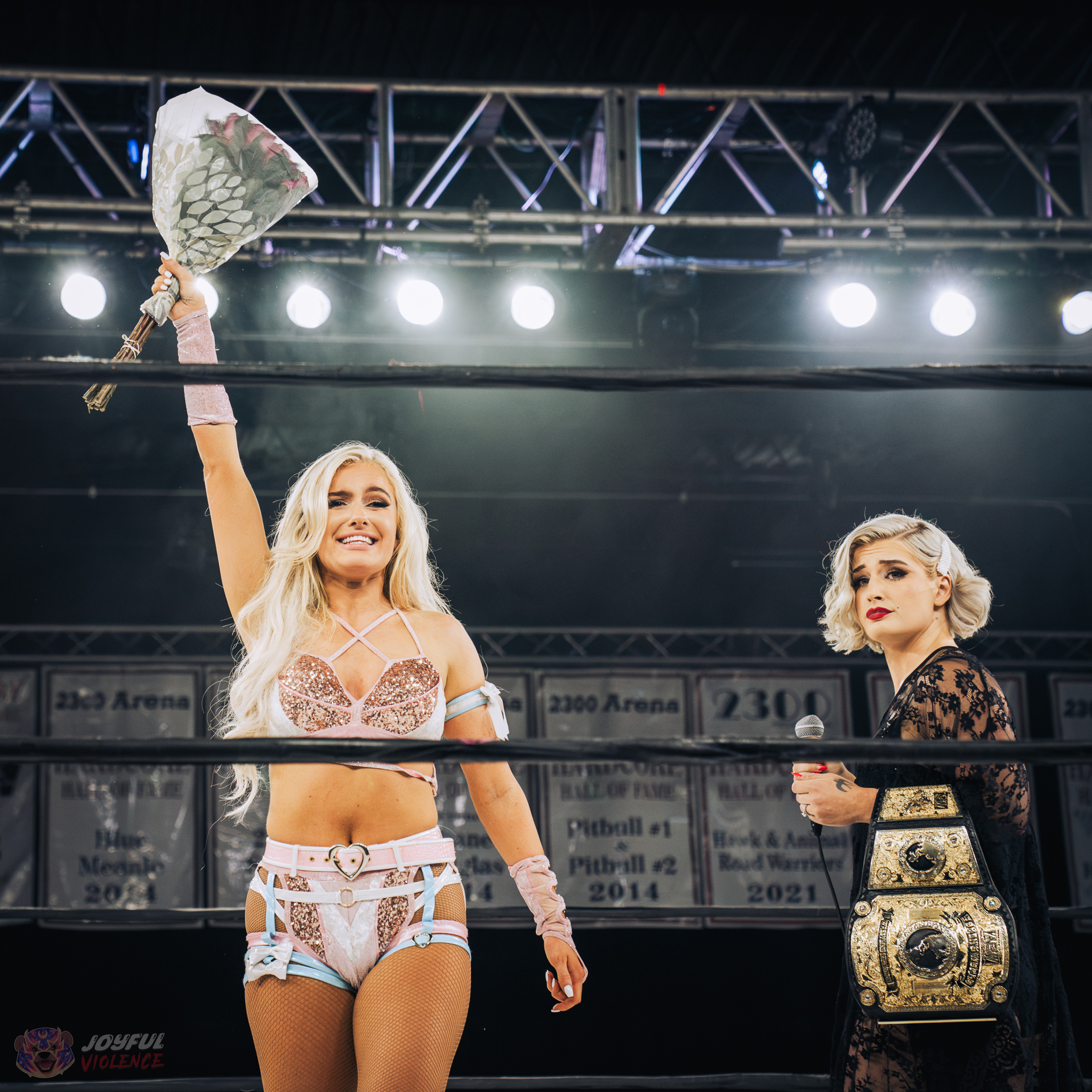
Mariah May (left) was introduced as Storm's obsessive fan in November 2023, and would later become her "understudy" and play "the part" of Storm's previous persona until betraying Storm in July 2024

On 3 March 2024 at Revolution, Storm successfully defended her title against Deonna Purrazzo. It was also at Revolution that May adopted Storm's previous "Rockstar" persona, sporting Storm's old ring attire and entrance music, and would begin wrestling matches on Dynamite and Collision in this persona as a tribute to Storm. On 21 April at Dynasty, Storm successfully defended the AEW Women's World Championship against Thunder Rosa. On 26 May at Double or Nothing, Storm successfully defended her title against Serena Deeb. During Stardom's 2 June event, Storm and May appeared in a vignette where Storm challenged May's friend and former Stardom tag partner Mina Shirakawa to a match at Forbidden Door. On the 5 June episode of Dynamite, Shirakawa accepted the challenge. At Forbidden Door, Storm retained the title; following the match, May convinced Storm and Shirakawa to put aside their differences by initiating a three-way kiss. It had been teased that May was conflicted about who to side with, and that she was romantically tied to both women. On the 10 July episode of Dynamite, May defeated Willow Nightingale in the finals of the Owen Hart Foundation Women's Tournament to earn a shot at Storm's championship on 25 August at All In; May and Storm celebrated after the match, but May then viciously attacked Storm and Luther with the tournament championship belt and bloodied Storm with her own high heel, turning Storm face after being a tweener alongside May for months. The two would attack and insult each other at any given opportunity over the next month until All In, where Storm hesitated to use the bloodstained high heel as a weapon, allowing May to take advantage and end her third AEW Women's World Championship reign at 281 days.

After nearly four months on hiatus, Storm made her return on 11 December at Winter is Coming, now under her previous "Rockstar" persona, where she confronted May after May's successful title defense against Shirakawa. She began acting as if she just made her debut in AEW and had no memory of her "Timeless" persona, being friendly and respectful towards May as May was to her. After winning a Casino Gauntlet match at Maximum Carnage to earn title shot against May, she returned to her "Timeless" persona and revealed that her "Rockstar" act was all a ruse. On 15 February 2025 at Grand Slam Australia, Storm defeated May to win the AEW Women's World Champion for a record-setting fourth time. On 9 March at Revolution, she defeated May to retain her championship in a "Hollywood Ending" falls count anywhere match, ending their feud. On 6 April at Dynasty, she retained her title against Megan Bayne. On 25 May at Double or Nothing, she defended her title against Shirakawa, with whom she would then begin teaming up in tag team matches. On 12 July at All In, she successfully defended her title against the 2025 Owen Hart Foundation Women's Tournament winner Mercedes Moné. At Forbidden Door on 24 August, Storm successfully defended her title against Athena, who executed her Casino Gauntlet contract. On 20 September at All Out, Storm lost her title to Kris Statlander in a four-way match, also involving Jamie Hayter and Thekla, ending her fourth reign at 217 days. On 18 October at WrestleDream, Storm failed to regain the title from Statlander. On 12 November at Blood & Guts, Storm competed in the first ever women's Blood and Guts match, but her team was defeated after Storm surrendered to save her tag team partner Mina Shirakawa. Storm and Shirakawa, as the "Timeless Love Bombs", competed in a tournament to determine the inaugural AEW Women's World Tag Team Champions, where they made it to the final but lost to the Babes of Wrath (Willow Nightingale and Harley Cameron).

In early 2026, Storm began feuding with Marina Shafir. On 14 February 2026 at Grand Slam Australia, Storm and Orange Cassidy defeated Shafir and Wheeler Yuta. Per the stipulation, Yuta was forced to have his hair shaved bald due to taking the fall. At Revolution on 15 March, Storm defeated Shafir. After the match, Storm was confronted by a debuting Ronda Rousey, a longtime friend of Shafir. On the following episode of Dynamite, Storm was mysteriously attacked backstage and was replaced by Mina Shirakawa in what would have been a scheduled rematch against Shafir that same night; this was done to write off Storm as she would be reportedly out of action for "a long time" due to an undisclosed non-injury related reason and was expected to miss the rest of the year.

=== New Japan Pro-Wrestling (2023) ===
On 21 May 2023, Storm made her debut for New Japan Pro-Wrestling at Resurgence, interfering to aid Juice Robinson in his street fight match against Fred Rosser.

=== Return to World Wonder Ring Stardom (2024) ===
On 4 April 2024, Storm returned to Stardom at Stardom American Dream 2024, where she confronted Mina Shirakawa and let her know that the "forbidden door is always open". On 5 October at Stardom Nagoya Golden Fight 2024, she unsuccessfully challenged Mayu Iwatani for the IWGP Women's Championship.

=== Consejo Mundial de Lucha Libre (2024) ===
On 28 September 2024, it was revealed that Storm would face La Catalina at the Consejo Mundial de Lucha Libre (CMLL) Viernes Espectacular event on 11 October, marking her CMLL debut and her first match in Mexico. The match was delayed a week due to Hurricane Milton. On 18 October, Storm was defeated by La Catalina.

== Professional wrestling persona ==
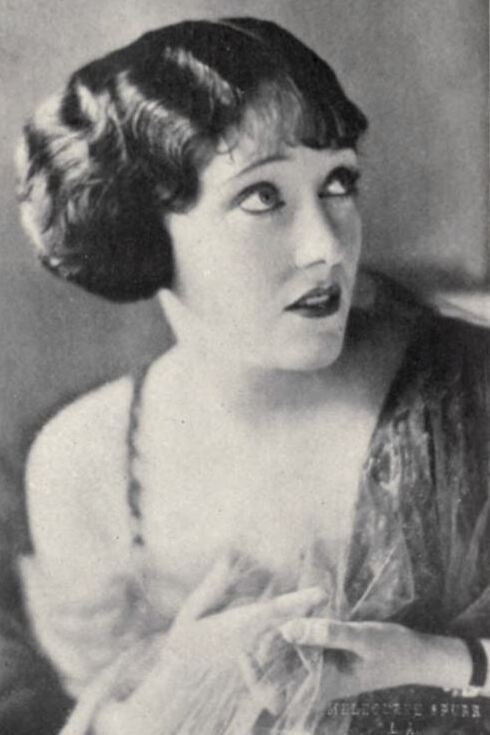
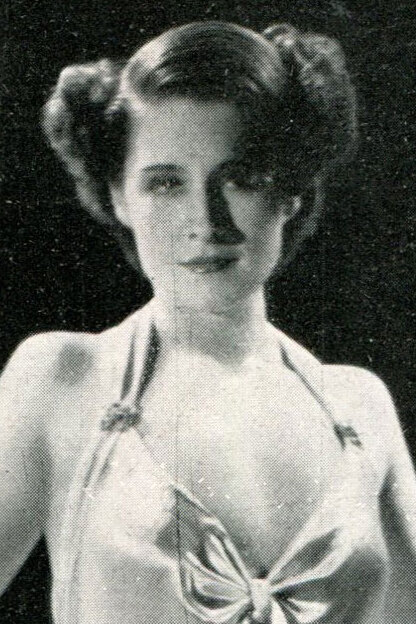
Beginning in 2023, Storm took on the persona of a Golden Age of Hollywood starlet, drawing comparisons to Gloria Swanson and Norma Shearer

While competing on the independent circuit, Storm began to develop different personas before settling on one highly influenced by her enjoyment of 1980s glam metal music, leading her to take on a "rock star" aesthetic. This persona carried on through her time under the WWE banner and into the early goings of her run in AEW.

Beginning in the latter half of 2023 in conjunction with her disassociation from The Outcasts stable, she adopted the "Timeless" Toni Storm persona which saw her transition into the character of a demanding and paranoid Golden Age of Hollywood starlet. As part of the transition, Storm dropped her previous rock star aesthetic and began sporting a bobbed and curled haircut, wearing early 20th-century fashion-inspired outfits and appearing in black and white vignettes. During her matches, Storm began to dictate to AEW's "director", telling them "I'm ready for my close up" (quoting Gloria Swanson's character in Sunset Boulevard) before a dramatic zoom as well as speaking directly to the audience to inform them "and now a word from our sponsors" just before a commercial break. The "Timeless" persona drew comparisons to actresses Swanson and Norma Shearer. Later elements of the gimmick, especially during her feud with Mariah May, took inspiration from other Golden Age films such as All About Eve and What Ever Happened to Baby Jane?

"Timeless" Toni Storm is also known to speak in comically frank terms about herself and her sexuality, referring to herself as "this whore you all adore, this slut you can’t rebut, this tramp is still the champ". Additionally, Storm is openly bisexual onscreen, having romantic relationships with other women wrestlers such as Mariah May and Mina Shirakawa.

Storm's "Timeless" persona has been critically lauded within professional wrestling and was awarded the "Best Gimmick in professional wrestling" award in the Wrestling Observer Newsletter awards in back-to-back years (2023 and 2024).

Storm's finishing move is a snap piledriver called the Storm Zero. It was previously a sit-out double underhook powerbomb.

== Other media ==
As Toni Storm, Rossall is a playable character in the video games WWE 2K20 and WWE 2K22. She also appears in AEW Fight Forever as DLC.

In August 2022, Rossall was featured as the cover girl of Fitness Gurls magazine.

== Personal life ==
In June 2020, it was revealed that Rossall was dating American wrestler Juice Robinson. They were married in 2022.

In June 2021, during her takeover of the WWE NXT Instagram account for Pride Month, Rossall came out as bisexual.

Rossall is a vegan, something which she has said proved to be a challenge with the lifestyle of a professional wrestler.

== Championships and accomplishments ==
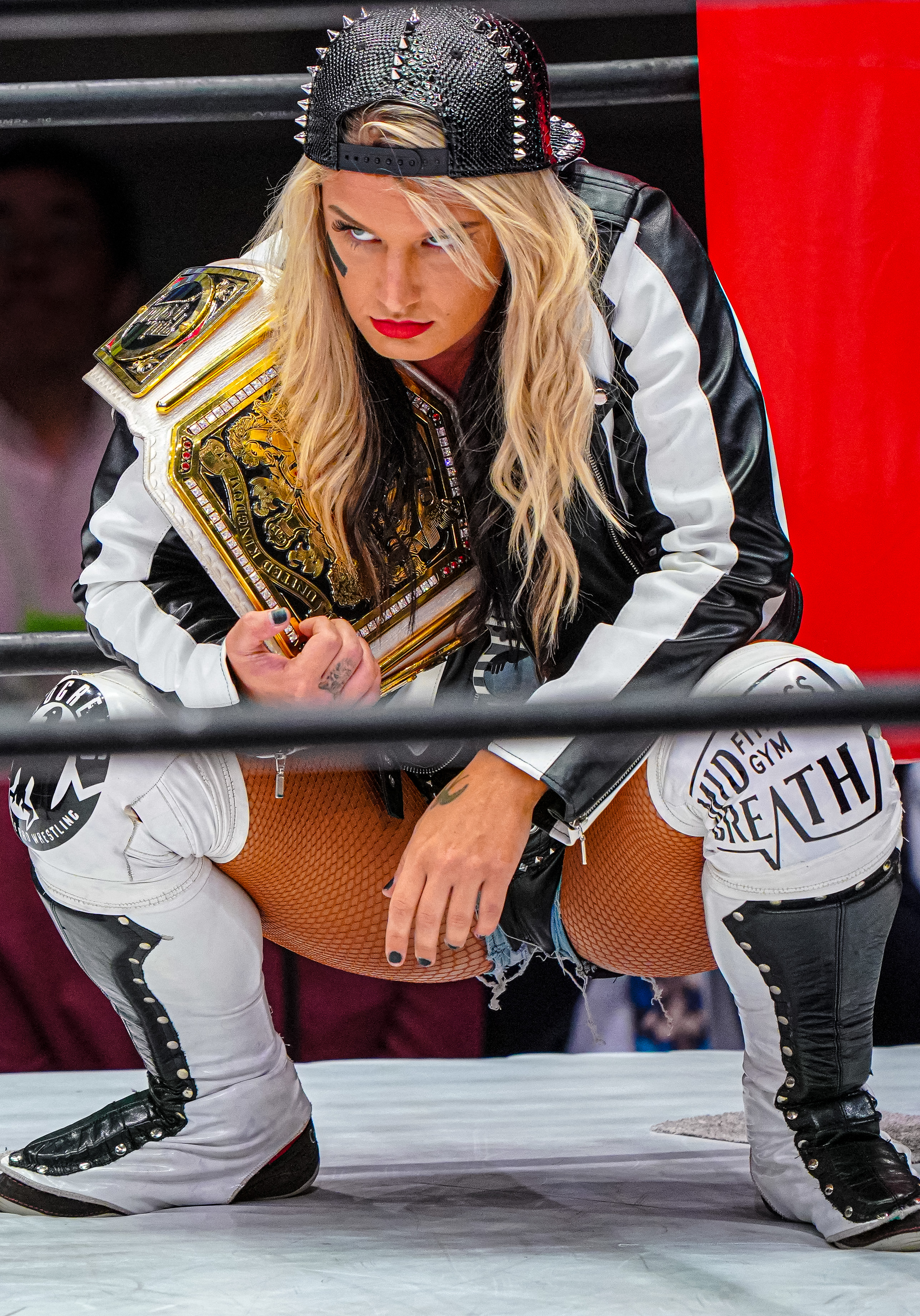
Storm as the NXT UK Women's Champion in May 2019

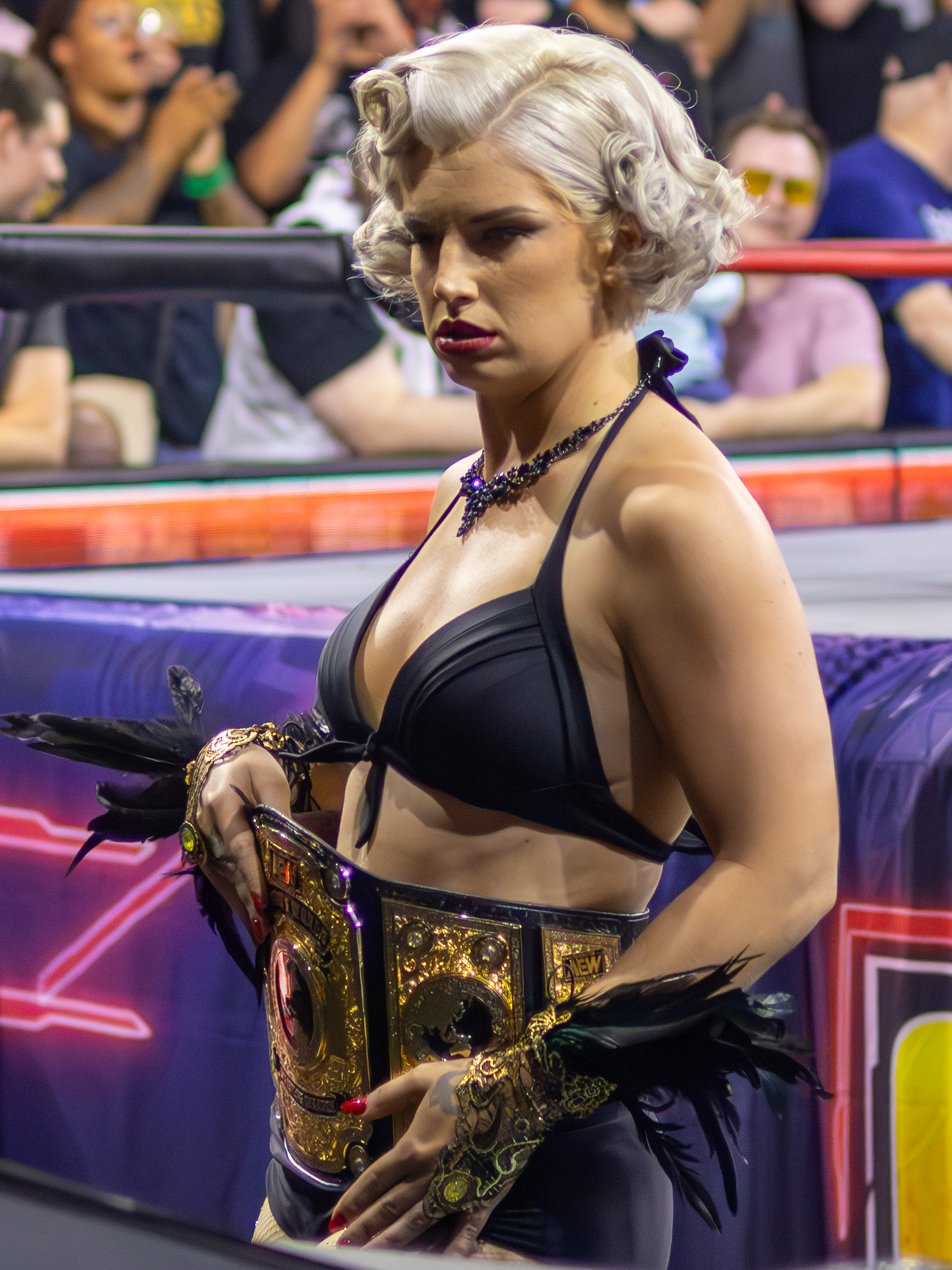
Storm is a record four-time AEW Women's World Champion.

- All Action Wrestling
  - AAW Women's Championship (1 time)
- All Elite Wrestling
  - AEW Women's World Championship (4 times)
  - Casino Gauntlet match (2025)
- British Empire Wrestling
  - BEW Women's Championship (1 time)
- ESPN
  - Ranked No. 16 of the 30 best Pro Wrestlers Under 30 in 2023
  - Women's Wrestler of the Year (2024) - tied with Roxanne Perez
  - Participant in best storyline of 2025 (with Mariah May)
- Pro Wrestling Alliance Queensland
  - PWAQ Women's Championship (1 times)
  - PWAQ Women's Underground Championship (1 time)
- Pro Wrestling Illustrated
  - Most Popular Wrestler of the Year (2025)
  - Ranked No. 1 of the top 250 female wrestlers in the PWI Women's 250 in 2024
  - Woman of the Year (2024)
- Progress Wrestling
  - Progress Women's Championship (1 time, inaugural)
  - Natural Progression Series IV
- Sports Illustrated
  - Best on the Mic (2025)
  - Ranked No. 7 in the top 10 women's wrestlers in 2018
- Westside Xtreme Wrestling
  - wXw Women's Championship (2 times)
  - Femmes Fatales Tournament (2017)
- World Wonder Ring Stardom
  - SWA World Championship (1 time)
  - World of Stardom Championship (1 time)
  - Cinderella Tournament (2017)
  - 5★Star GP (2017)
  - 5★Star GP Award (1 time)
    - 5★Star GP Outstanding Performance Award (2016)
  - Stardom Year-End Awards (1 time)
    - MVP Award (2017)
- Wrestling Observer Newsletter
  - Best Gimmick (2023–2025)
- WWE
  - NXT UK Women's Championship (1 time)
  - Mae Young Classic (2018)

== Luchas de Apuestas record ==
Winner (wager)	Loser (wager)	Location	Event	Date	Notes
Orange Cassidy and Toni Storm (hair)	Wheeler Yuta and Marina Shafir (hair) (Note: Only Yuta was required to shave his hair.)	Sydney, Australia	Grand Slam Australia	14 February 2026	
