= Harley Cameron =

Australian professional wrestler

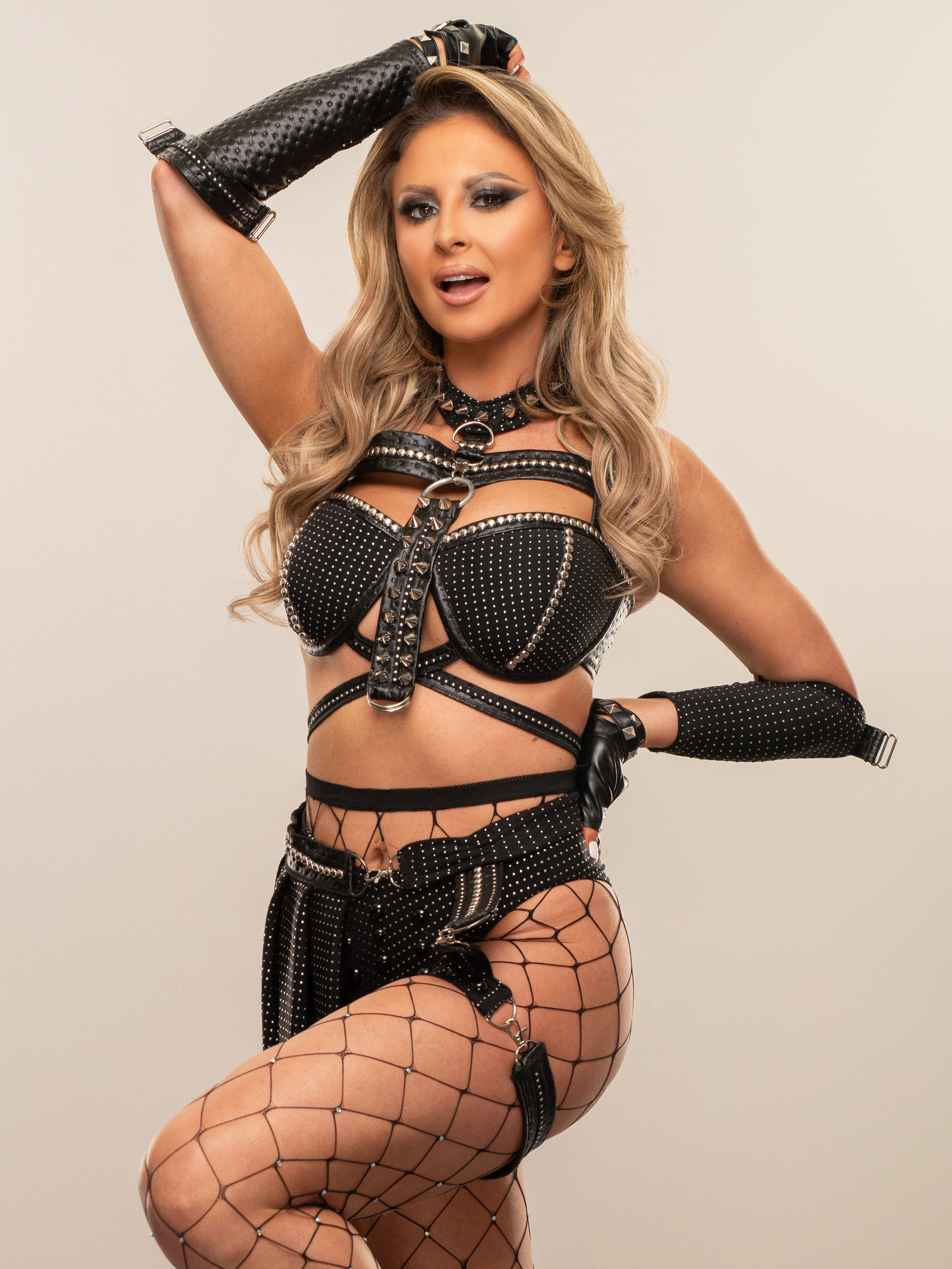
- Cameron in 2024

Personal information
- Born: Danielle Louise Glanville; 4 January 1994 (age 32) Alstonville, New South Wales, Australia

Professional wrestling career
- Ring name(s): Danni Ellexo; Harley Cameron; Harleygram
- Billed from: Gold Coast, Australia
- Trained by: Flatbacks Wrestling School; Tyler Breeze; Shawn Spears
- Debut: February 2022

Danielle Louise Glanville (born 4 January 1994) is an Australian professional wrestler, singer, and model. As of June 2023, she is signed to All Elite Wrestling (AEW), where she performs under the ring name Harley Cameron. She is currently one-half of the AEW Women's World Tag Team Champions with Kris Statlander as Wrathlander in their first reign as a team, but it is Cameron's record-setting second reign individually.

== Early life ==
Glanville was born on 4 January 1994 in Alstonville, New South Wales and spent the early years of her life attending primary school there. She has six older siblings and two younger siblings, and was first introduced to professional wrestling by her younger brother, who was a fan of The Undertaker. Her family moved to the Gold Coast when she was 13 years old, and she attended Banora Point High School throughout her teenage years. She pursued various interests such as soccer, singing, and dancing, and ultimately earned a degree in journalism from Bond University.

Initially intending to work in news media, Glanville ventured into finance as a mortgage lender while continuing to pursue music. She later worked at Dracula's Cabaret under the stage name Luna. She also participated in bikini and bodybuilding competitions. She moved to the U.S. in 2018 to further her career in singing and modelling, and eventually became a ring girl for Bare Knuckle Fighting Championship while focusing on her singing career.

== Professional wrestling career ==
=== Early career (2021–2022) ===
In 2021, Glanville began her professional wrestling training under Tyler Breeze and Shawn Spears at their Flatbacks Wrestling School in Orlando, Florida, where she reportedly progressed at a rapid pace due to her bodybuilding experience and entertainment background. She worked her first wrestling events without pay as she had not yet received her green card. Under the ring name Danni Ellexo, she appeared at Impact Wrestling's Bound for Glory in October 2021 to accompany the debuting tag team The IInspiration. She wrestled her first known match in February 2022 for WrestlePro, losing to Scarlett Bordeaux. It was later revealed that she was expected to sign with WWE, but many of the people suggesting her to WWE management were released as part of mass layoffs.

=== All Elite Wrestling (2022–present) ===
==== Early beginnings (2022–2025) ====
After stints on the independent circuit with Shine Wrestling, Coastal Championship Wrestling, and World Wrestling Network, she debuted under the ring name Harley Cameron on an episode of AEW's Dark in July 2022, losing to Willow Nightingale. In 2023, she turned heel and joined Q. T. Marshall's stable QTV, appearing on Dynamite and Rampage. She officially signed with the company in April. QTV disbanded when Marshall left AEW in late 2023, and Cameron was introduced to Saraya by Ruby Soho as a new member of The Outcasts after Toni Storm's departure from the group. She made her Dynamite in-ring debut on 8 May 2024 against Storm's protégée Mariah May, who defeated her.

In early 2025, Cameron turned face and began a feud with Mercedes Moné for Moné's AEW TBS Championship, gaining popularity by using her ventriloquism skills to taunt and annoy Moné with a hand puppet she dubbed Mini Moné. On 15 February at Grand Slam Australia, she lost to Moné. Cameron later formed an alliance with Anna Jay to feud with Megan Bayne and Penelope Ford, with the feud culminating on 28 May episode of Dynamite, where Bayne and Ford defeated Jay and Cameron in a street fight. Cameron later took time off to heal from a nose injury. On 12 July at All In, she returned from injury during the women's Casino Gauntlet match to fend off Ford from interfering in the match.

==== Babes of Wrath (2025–2026) ====
Later in the year, she formed a tag team with Nightingale called the Babes of Wrath. On 12 November at Blood & Guts, the two competed in the first ever women's Blood & Guts match, but their team was defeated. The Babes of Wrath also entered the tournament to determine the inaugural AEW Women's World Tag Team Champions, where they defeated Mercedes Moné and Athena in the first round, Sisters of Sin (Julia Hart and Skye Blue) in the semi-finals, and Timeless Love Bombs (Mina Shirakawa and "Timeless" Toni Storm) to become the inaugural champions. This marked Cameron's first ever championship in her career. At Worlds End on 27 December, the Babes of Wrath successfully defended their titles against Athena and Mercedes Moné.

At Revolution on March 15, 2026, Babes of Wrath lost the AEW Women's World Tag Team Championship to Divine Dominion (Megan Bayne and Lena Kross), ending their reign at 95 days. After failing to regain the titles from Divine Domninon on the March 27 episode of Collision, the Babes of Wrath decided to mutually disband to focus on singles ventures.

==== Wrathlander (2026–present) ====
On 10 October, at Grand Slam France, Cameron teamed with Kris Statlander as "Wrathlander" to win a three-way tag team match to become the #1 contenders to the AEW Women's World Tag Team Championship against The Brawling Birds (Alex Windsor and Jamie Hayter). The match originally scheduled to take a place a week later at WrestleDream but was postponed due to Hayter suffering an injury. On 5 November, Wrathlander competed in a six-on-six Blood and Guts match at the namesake event, where their team was victorious after the duo forced Julia Hart to submit. At Full Gear on 14 November, Wrathlander defeated The Brawling Birds to win the AEW Women's World Tag Team Championship for the first time as a team, also making Cameron the first two-time holder of the title.

== Singing ==
Glanville released a music video for her first song "Indestructible", starring WWE wrestlers Scarlett Bordeaux and Shotzi Blackheart, in 2021. She worked with the duo again to release a cover of Screamin' Jay Hawkins' "I Put a Spell on You", which was also given an accompanying music video. She later collaborated with the tag team The IInspiration to release a music video for her song named after them. In January 2025, Glanville performed live with Chris Jericho's band Fozzy on Chris Jericho's Rock 'N' Wrestling Rager at Sea, where she and Jericho duetted on a cover of "I Hate Myself for Loving You" by Joan Jett and the Blackhearts.

== Personal life ==
Glanville formerly dated rugby player and professional wrestler Daniel Vidot, whose move from rugby to wrestling sparked her initial interest in becoming a wrestler. They became engaged in 2018, but split up in 2024.

Glanville plays both the bass and the guitar, is fluent in Mandarin, and has practiced ventriloquism; she often incorporates the latter into her wrestling character.

== Championships and accomplishments ==
- All Elite Wrestling
  - AEW Women's World Tag Team Championship (2 times, inaugural, current) – with Willow Nightingale (1) and Kris Statlander (1, current)
  - AEW Women's World Tag Team Championship Tournament – with Willow Nightingale
- Pro Wrestling Illustrated
  - Most Improved Wrestler of the Year (2025)
  - Ranked No. 138 of the top 250 female wrestlers in the PWI Women's 250 in 2025
- Wrestling Observer Newsletter
  - Most Improved (2025)
