= Willow Nightingale =

American professional wrestler (born 1994)

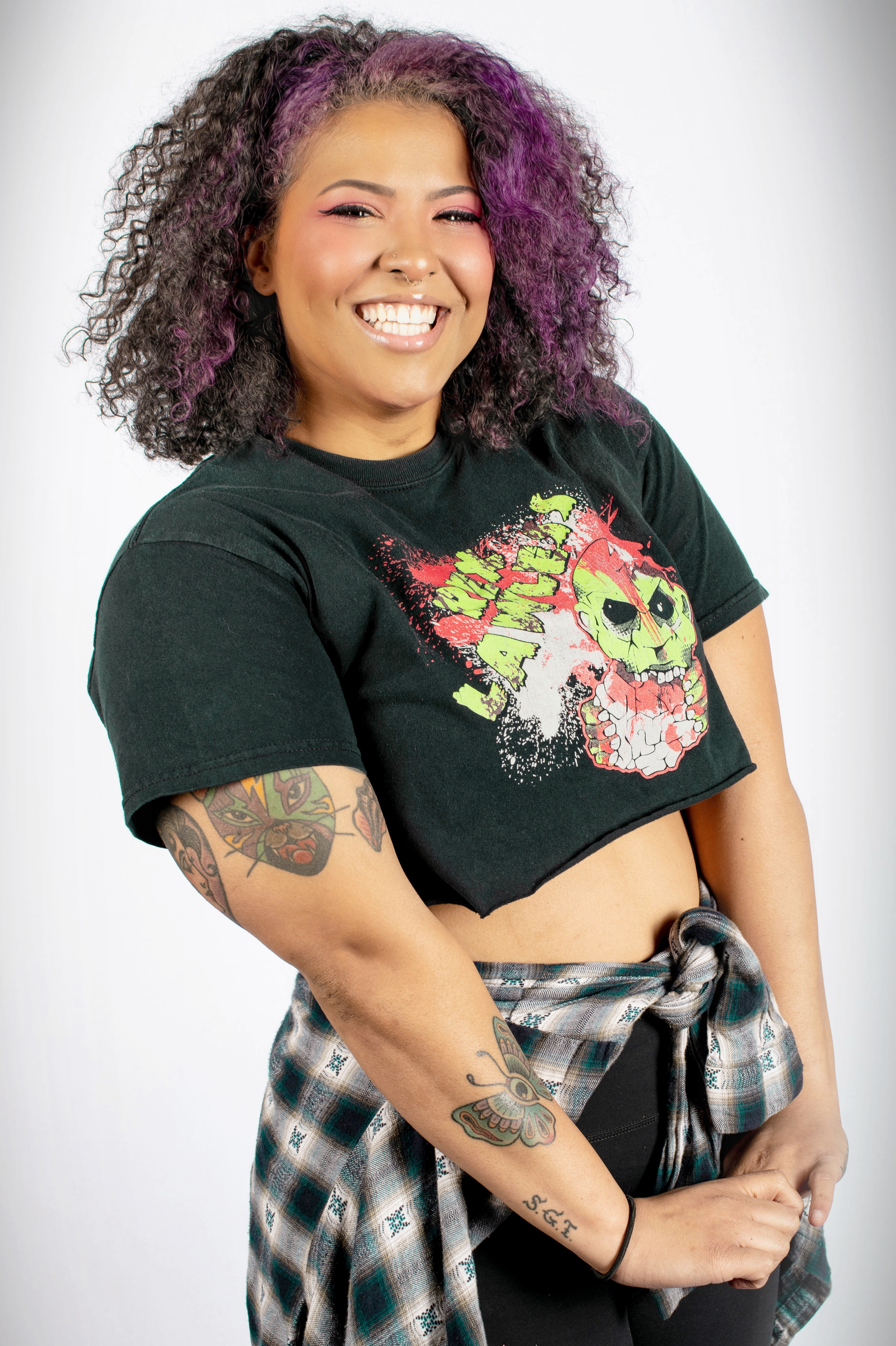
- Nightingale in 2023

Personal information
- Born: Danielle Paultre; January 25, 1994 (age 32) North Valley Stream, New York, U.S.

Professional wrestling career
- Ring name(s): Eye Candy; Willa Monet; Willow Monet; Willow Nightingale
- Billed height: 5 ft 6 in (1.68 m)
- Billed weight: 183 lb (83 kg)
- Billed from: Long Island, New York
- Trained by: Bull James; Mike Mondo
- Debut: February 27, 2015

Danielle Paultre (born January 25, 1994), better known by the ring name Willow Nightingale, is an American professional wrestler. As of October 2022, she signed to All Elite Wrestling (AEW), where she is a member of The Conglomeration stable.

In addition to her work in AEW and NJPW, Nightingale is known for her tenures with Ring of Honor and Shimmer Women Athletes, challenging for championships in both promotions. In AEW, she is a former record-setting two-time AEW TBS Champion, a former one-time and inaugural AEW Women's World Tag Team Champion (with Harley Cameron), and a one-time AEW Women's World Champion; upon winning the latter in July 2026, she became the first AEW Women's Triple Crown Champion.

== Professional wrestling career ==
=== Independent circuit (2015–present) ===
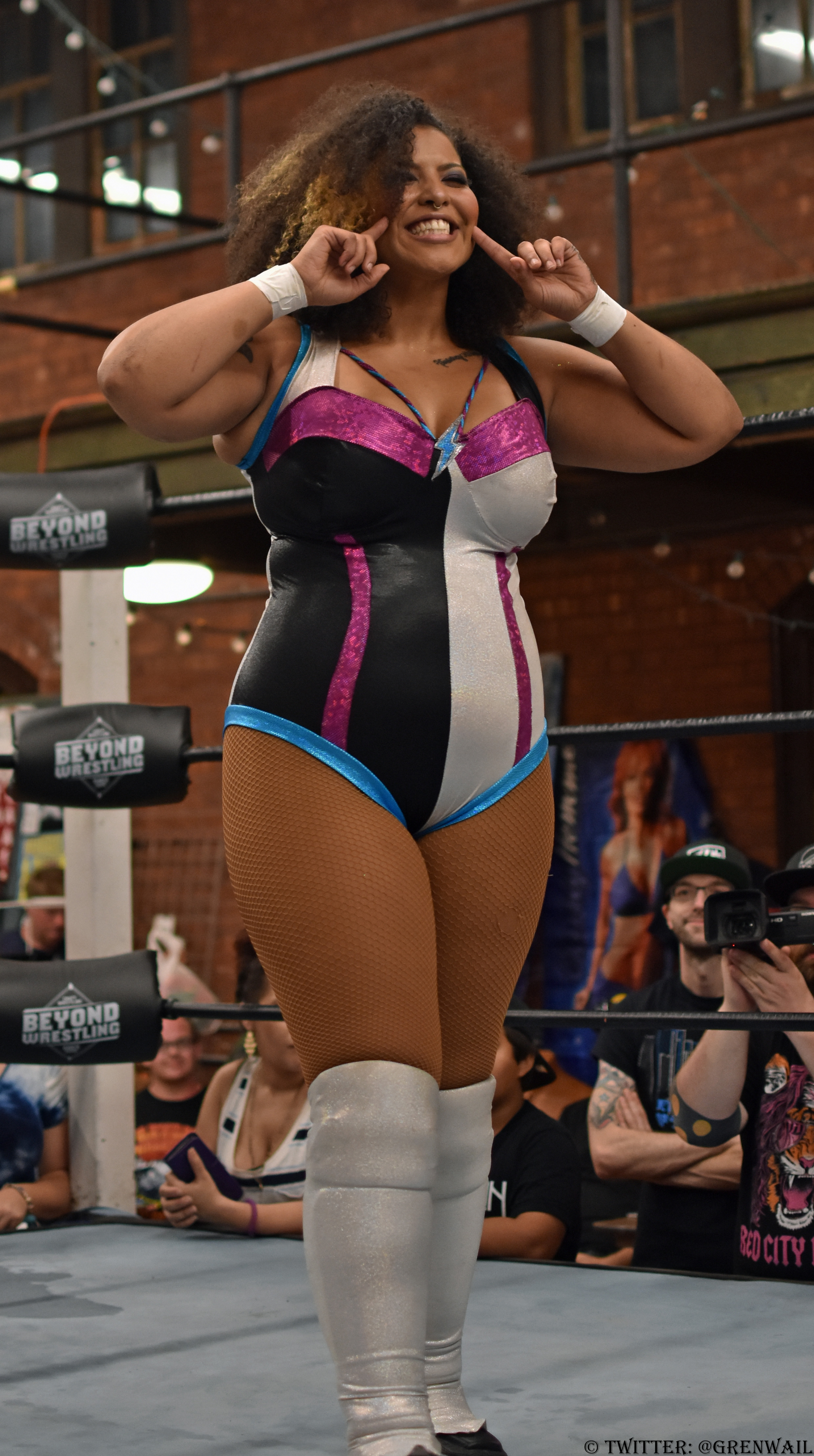
Nightingale in 2018

Paultre was trained by Mike Mondo at the New York Wrestling Connection (NYWC) school in Deer Park, New York. On February 27, 2015, Paultre, under the ring name Willow Nightingale, made her professional wrestling debut on NYWC's We Can Do It event, losing to Sammy Pickles. A year after her debut, Nightingale won the NYWC Starlet Championship. On November 21, 2018, at Shimmer Women Athletes' Volume 108 event, Nightingale unsuccessfully faced Dust for the Heart of Shimmer Championship. After holding the NYWC Starlet Championship since February 2016, Nightingale lost the title to Kris Statlander on February 23, 2019. Nightingale reclaimed the NYWC Starlet Championship on January 25, 2020, defeating then-champion Tina San Antonio in a steel cage match. On February 26, 2022, Nightingale defeated Johnny Radke, Dino Might, and John Silver in a four-way match to win the NYWC Fusion Championship.

=== All Elite Wrestling / Ring of Honor (2021–present) ===
==== Early beginnings and TBS Champion (2021–2024) ====
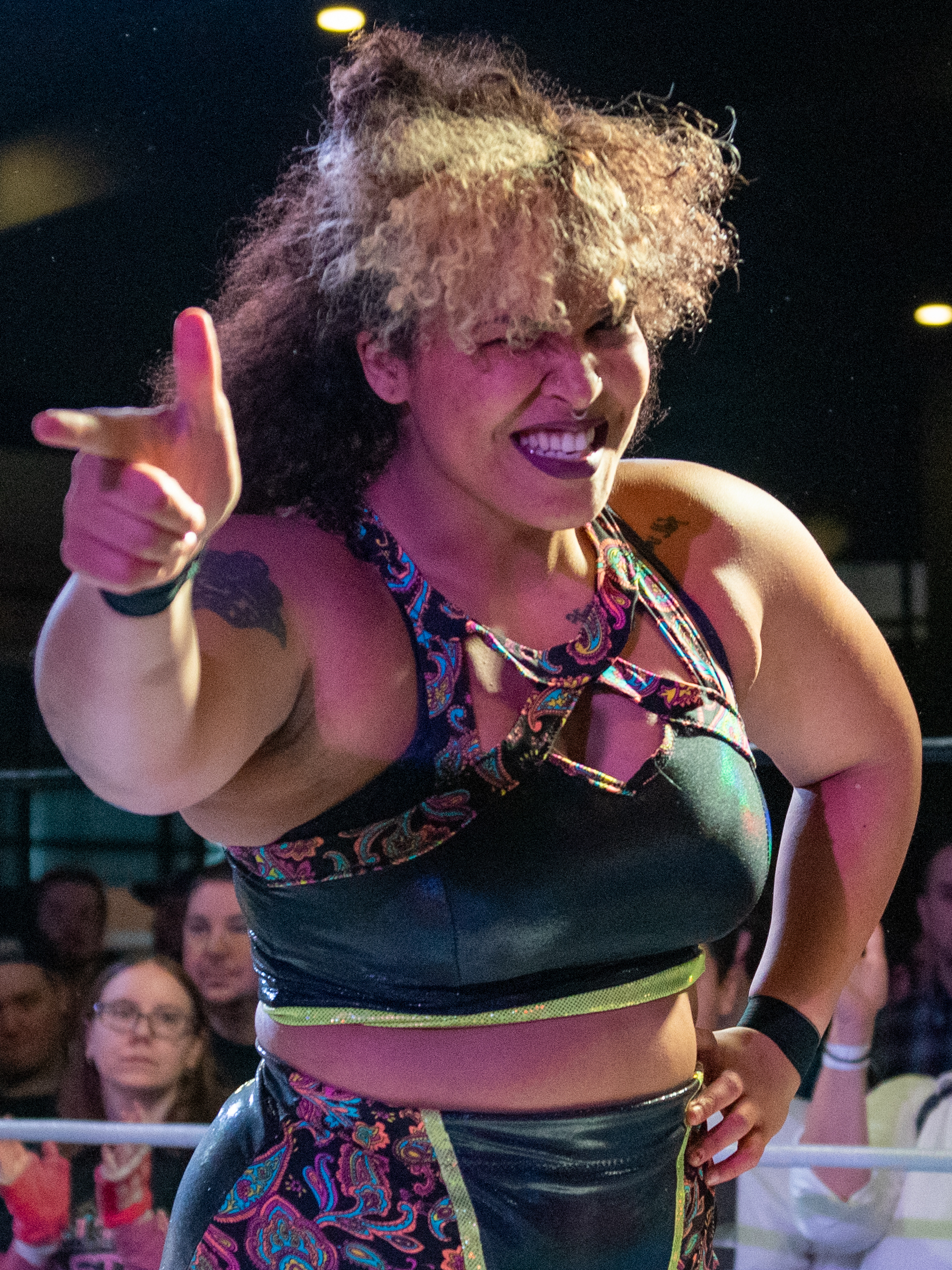
Nightingale in 2020

On May 3, 2021, Nightingale made her All Elite Wrestling (AEW) debut, competing on AEW Dark: Elevation against Thunder Rosa, to whom she lost. On June 6, Nightingale made her Ring of Honor (ROH) debut on ROH's Women's Division Wednesday program, where she defeated Alex Gracia. On August 4, Nightingale competed in the ROH Women's World Championship tournament to determine the inaugural champion, losing to Allysin Kay in the first round. On December 3, Nightingale defeated Mandy Leon to become the number one contender for the ROH Women's World Championship. On December 11, at Final Battle, Nightingale unsuccessfully challenged Rok-C for the Women's World Championship. Following Final Battle, ROH went on hiatus. During this hiatus, AEW President and CEO Tony Khan purchased ROH.

On April 1, 2022, at Supercard of Honor, Nightingale faced Mercedes Martinez for the interim ROH Women's World Championship but was defeated. On April 8, on AEW Rampage, Nightingale participated in the Owen Hart Cup tournament, losing to Red Velvet during a qualifying round match. On June 6 episode of Ring of Honor, Nightingale successfully defended the Strong Women's Championship against Rachael Ellering. On June 17, at Road Rager, Nightingale challenged Jade Cargill in a match for the AEW TBS Championship, which Willow lost. Nightingale challenged for the championship again at Battle of the Belts IV, losing once again. On the October 21 episode of Rampage, it was announced that Nightingale had signed with AEW.

On June 2, 2023, Nightingale defended the Strong Women's Championship against Emi Sakura on All Elite Wrestling's television show AEW Rampage, marking the first time that title was defended outside of NJPW. On June 17 at the premiere episode of Collision, Nightingale teamed up with Skye Blue to defeat Ruby Soho and the AEW Women's World Champion Toni Storm. Nightingale competed in the 2023 Owen Hart Foundation Women's Tournament, winning over Nyla Rose and advancing to the finals by defeating Athena in the semifinal round. On the July 15 episode of Collision, Nightingale defeated Ruby Soho to win the women's tournament. On July 16, it was announced that Willow will be facing Athena at Death Before Dishonor of year 2023 for the ROH Women's World Championship. This match main evented the Pay-per-view and during this match Willow was not successful as Athena retained. On September 23, 2023, episode of Collision, Nightingale was injured and pulled from the match against Julia Hart. Kiera Hogan was Nightingale's replacement in the match against Hart until she was defeated by Hart. Hart attacked Hogan until Skye Blue came out to make the save, but Blue was misted by Hart, "blinding" her.

In late 2023, Nightingale formed a tag team with Kris Statlander and they were managed by Stokely Hathaway. On April 21, 2024, at Dynasty, Nightingale defeated Julia Hart to win the AEW TBS Championship. On the May 1 episode of Rampage, Nightingale successfully defended her TBS Championship against Skye Blue in a Manitoba Massacre. On May 26 at Double or Nothing, Nightingale lost the TBS Championship to Mercedes Moné, ending her reign at 35 days. After the match, Nightingale was attacked by Statlander, ending their tag team.

==== The Conglomeration (2024–present) ====
Sometime after splitting with Statlander, Nightingale joined The Conglomeration. At Beach Break on July 3, Nightingale defeated Statlander to advance to the finals of the Owen Hart Cup. On the July 10 episode of Dynamite, Nightingale lost the Owen Hart Cup finals to Mariah May due to interference from Statlander. On August 25 at All In Zero Hour, Nightingale with fellow Conglomeration member Tomohiro Ishii to defeat Statlander and Hathaway. Since Nightingale's team won, she was allowed to choose the stipulation for her and Statlander's match at All Out on September 7, which she chose to make it a Chicago Street Fight. The match was meant to be for the CMLL World Women's Championship but that stipulation was abandoned due to CMLL not allowing titles to be defended in street fights. At All Out, Nightingale was defeated by Statlander, ending their feud. On October 12 at WrestleDream, Nightingale unsuccessfully challenged Mariah May for the AEW Women's World Championship. After WrestleDream, it was reported that Nightingale would take time off to recover from a concussion. On November 23 at Full Gear, Nightingale returned during the AEW World Championship main event between fellow Conglomeration member Orange Cassidy and champion Jon Moxley, where she prevented Moxley's Death Riders stablemate Marina Shafir from interfering.

After Full Gear, Nightingale would assist the likes of Cope, Swerve Strickland, and Samoa Joe against the Death Riders, often acting as a counter to Shafir. On May 25 at Double or Nothing, Nightingale teamed with Kenny Omega, Swerve Strickland, and The Opps (Samoa Joe, Powerhouse Hobbs, and Katsuyori Shibata) to defeat the Death Riders (Jon Moxley, Claudio Castagnoli, Marina Shafir, and Wheeler Yuta) and The Young Bucks (Matthew Jackson and Nicholas Jackson) in an Anarchy in the Arena match. On July 12 at All In, Nightingale competed in the women's Casino Gauntlet match, which was won by Athena. On November 12 at Blood & Guts, Nightingale competed in the first ever women's Blood and Guts match, but her team was defeated. Nightingale began to team with Harley Cameron as the Babes of Wrath, winning a tournament to become the inaugural AEW Women's World Tag Team Champions after they defeated Timeless Love Bombs (Mina Shirakawa and "Timeless" Toni Storm). Weeks later, she also defeated Mercedes Moné at Dynamite: New Year's Smash to win TBS Championship for a record-setting second time, becoming a double champion in the process.

At Revolution on March 15, 2026, Nightingale would successfully defend her TBS Championship against Lena Kross, but the Babes of Wrath would lose the AEW Women's World Tag Team Championship to Divine Dominion (Megan Bayne and Lena Kross) that same night, ending their reign at 95 days. After failing to regain the titles from Divine Dominion on the March 27 episode of Collision, the Babes of Wrath decided to mutually disband to focus on singles ventures.

After the Babes of Wrath disbanded, Nightingale would go on to successfully defend the TBS Championship against returning wrestlers such as Hikaru Shida, Queen Aminata, Kamille, and Anna Jay, dubbing herself as the "Comeback Killer". On the May 20 episode of Dynamite, Nightingale was forced to withdraw from the 2026 Owen Hart Foundation Women's Tournament and relinquish the TBS Championship due to a shoulder injury, ending her second reign at 140 days.

On July 8 at Dynamite: Beach Break, Nightingale returned and won a Casino Gauntlet match to earn an AEW Women's World Championship match at Redemption on July 26, where she defeated Thekla to win the title and subsequently become the first-ever AEW Women's Triple Crown Champion. At All In on August 30, Nightingale lost the title to 2026 Owen Hart Cup winner Mercedes Moné, ending her reign at 35 days.

On November 4, Nightingale competed in a six-on-six Blood and Guts match at the namesake event, where her team was victorious.

=== Japanese promotions (2022–present) ===
On October 29, 2022, Nightingale made her Japan debut for Tokyo Joshi Pro-Wrestling (TJPW) at The Mountain Top 2022, teaming with Yuka Sakazaki, to defeat Maki Itoh and Yuki Kamifuku.

On April 27, 2023, New Japan Pro-Wrestling (NJPW) announced that Nightingale would compete in a four-woman single-elimination tournament on May 21 at Resurgence to crown the inaugural Strong Women's Champion. At Resurgence, Nightingale defeated Momo Kohgo in the semi-finals and Mercedes Moné in the finals to become the inaugural Strong Women's Champion. She had her first successful title defense on the June 2 episode of Rampage, where she retained the title by defeating Emi Sakura. On July 5, at the second night of NJPW Independence Day, Nightingale lost the title to Giulia, ending her reign at 45 days.

On April 4, 2024, at Stardom American Dream 2024, Nightingale made her debut for World Wonder Ring Stardom, teaming with Saki to defeat Syuri and Konami. On May 18 at Stardom Flashing Champions 2024, Nightingale successfully defended her TBS Championship against Tam Nakano.

On March 16, 2025, at Grand Princess '25, Nightingale made her return to TJPW and defeated Miu Watanabe.

=== Consejo Mundial de Lucha Libre (2024) ===
Nightingale made her debut for Consejo Mundial de Lucha Libre (CMLL) on March 29, 2024, at Homenaje a Dos Leyendas, where she teamed with La Catalina and Tessa Blanchard to defeat Lluvia, Stephanie Vaquer, and Zeuxis On July 13 at Fantastica Mania 2024: USA, Nightingale defeated Lluvia and Viva Van to win the vacant CMLL World Women's Championship. On September 13 at the CMLL 91st Anniversary Show, Nightingale lost the title to Zeuxis.

== Wrestling persona ==
Nightingale's personal motto is "Nothing Matters...Smile Anyway", and she portrays a bubbly, upbeat character determined not to be overcome by the pressures of life. Discussing her philosophy, Willow has said "A hundred billion years from now, none of us are going to be here and nothing that we did is going to be important. All we can control is how we experience life, so I’m doing my best to be around people...and find the best of it all".

Nightingale is dubbed by the AEW commentary team as "the Babe with the Power" (alternatively, "the Babe with the Powerbomb"), which is a reference to the David Bowie song "Magic Dance". Nightingale has a tattoo of Bowie on the back of one of her legs, and draws inspiration from Bowie for her persona.

Nightingale has credited Will Washington and Jimmy Jacobs with helping her to develop her persona while in AEW.

== Championships and accomplishments ==
- All Elite Wrestling
  - AEW Women's World Championship (1 time)
  - AEW TBS Championship (2 times)
  - AEW Women's World Tag Team Championship (1 time, inaugural) – with Harley Cameron
  - First AEW Women's Triple Crown Champion
  - Women's Owen Hart Cup (2023)
  - AEW Women's World Tag Team Championship Tournament – with Harley Cameron
  - Women’s Casino Gauntlet match (2026)
- Chikara
  - Chikara Campeonatos de Parejas (1 time, final) – with Solo Darling
- Consejo Mundial de Lucha Libre
  - CMLL World Women's Championship (1 time)
- New Japan Pro-Wrestling
  - Strong Women's Championship (1 time, inaugural)
  - Strong Women's Championship Tournament (2023)
- Pro Wrestling Illustrated
  - Ranked No. 2 of the top 150 women's wrestlers in the PWI Women's 250 in 2026
- Other Championships
  - Adult Swim Booty Championship (1 time, current; inaugural) – with Orange Cassidy
