= Mina Shirakawa =

Japanese professional wrestler

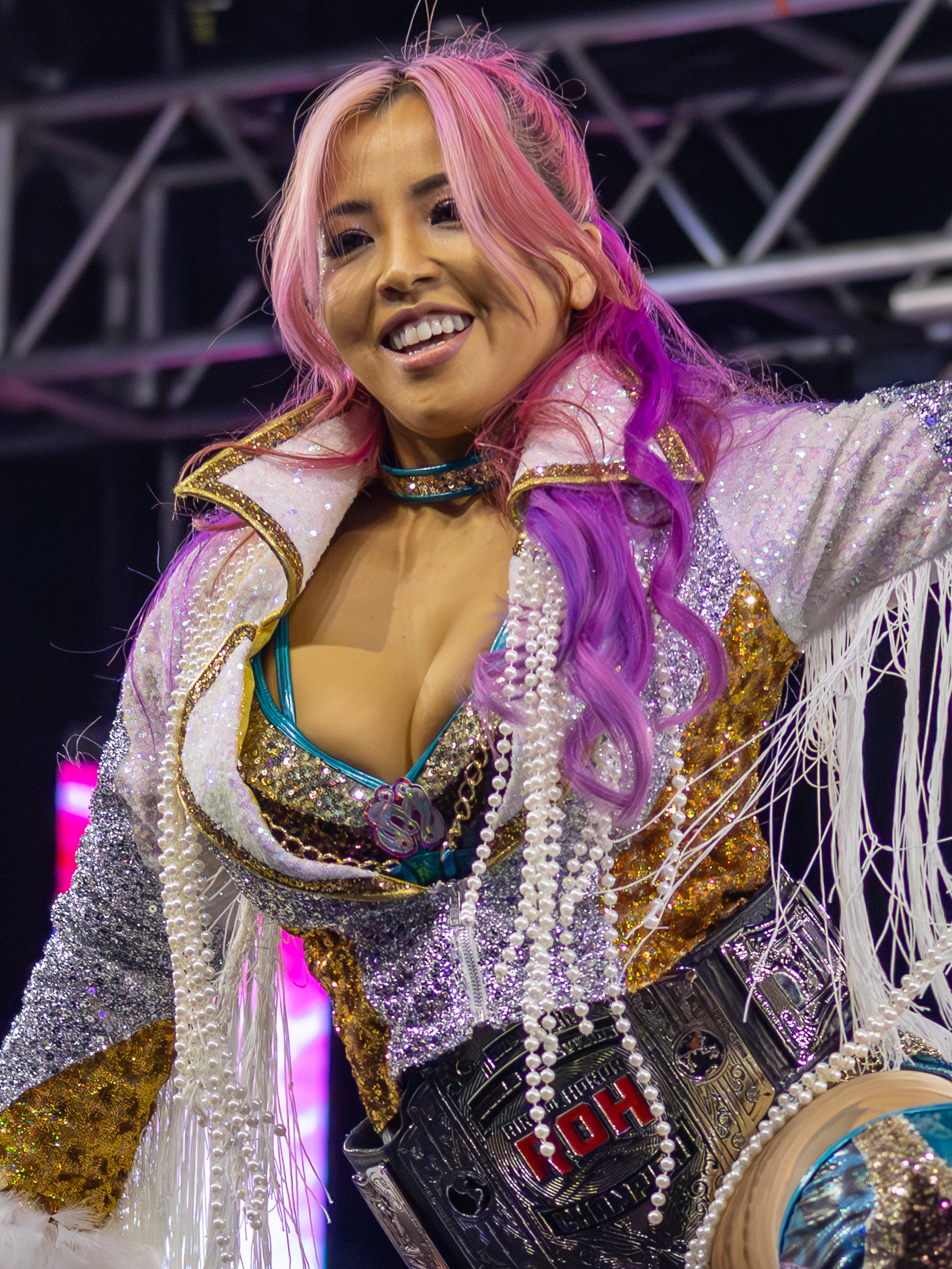
- Shirakawa in 2025

Personal information
- Born: December 26, 1987 (age 38) Tokyo, Japan

Professional wrestling career
- Ring name: Mina Shirakawa
- Billed height: 157 cm (5 ft 2 in)
- Billed weight: 54 kg (119 lb)
- Trained by: Tokyo Joshi Pro Wrestling
- Debut: August 5, 2018

Mina Shirakawa (白川未奈, Shirakawa Mina; born December 26, 1987) is a Japanese professional wrestler and tarento. She is signed to All Elite Wrestling (AEW). She also makes appearances for New Japan Pro-Wrestling (NJPW) and Ring of Honor (ROH), where she is a former one-time interim ROH Women's World Television Champion.

Shirakawa first gained recognition for her time in World Wonder Ring Stardom, where she became a two-time Artist of Stardom Champion, one-time Wonder of Stardom Champion, one-time Goddesses of Stardom Champion, and one-time Future of Stardom Champion. She was also a founding member of Cosmic Angels and the leader of Club Venus, later becoming co-leader alongside Maika when the group was rebranded as Empress Nexus Venus.

== Early life ==
Mina Shirakawa was born in Tokyo on December 26, 1987. She studied the English language and American literature at Aoyama Gakuin University. She worked as a wedding planner before becoming a professional wrestler.

== Professional wrestling career ==
=== Independent circuit (2018–2020) ===
Shirakawa began training for a professional wrestling career with Tokyo Joshi Pro Wrestling (TJPW), and made her debut at the age of 30 during Best Body Japan Pro-Wrestling (BBJ)'s inaugural event Muscle Ring on August 5, 2018. She teamed up with Shoko Nakajima in a losing effort against Reika Saiki and Hoshimi Muramatsu. She wrestled at several other events for the promotion such as BBJ Muscle Ring 2 on October 18, 2018, where she lost against Cherry, and BBJ Muscle Ring 3 on December 26, 2018, where she lost to Misaki Ohata. She appeared for DDT Pro-Wrestling at Ryōgoku Peter Pan 2018 on October 21, where she teamed up with Miyu Yamashita and Yuki Kamifuku in a losing effort against Nakajima, Yuka Sakazaki, and Mizuki in a six-woman tag team match. She then wrestled mostly for TJPW, with her debut occurring on the second night of TJP 5th Anniversary Shin-Kiba Tour on November 4, 2018, where she and Saiki lost a tag team match to Nakajima and Maki Itoh. CMLL and Lady's Ring held their second joint show Numero Dos on January 22, 2020, where the main event saw CMLL representative Dalys la Caribeña defeat Lady's Ring representative Shirakawa in a two-out-of-three falls match to win the CMLL Japan Women's Championship.

=== World Wonder Ring Stardom (2020–2025) ===
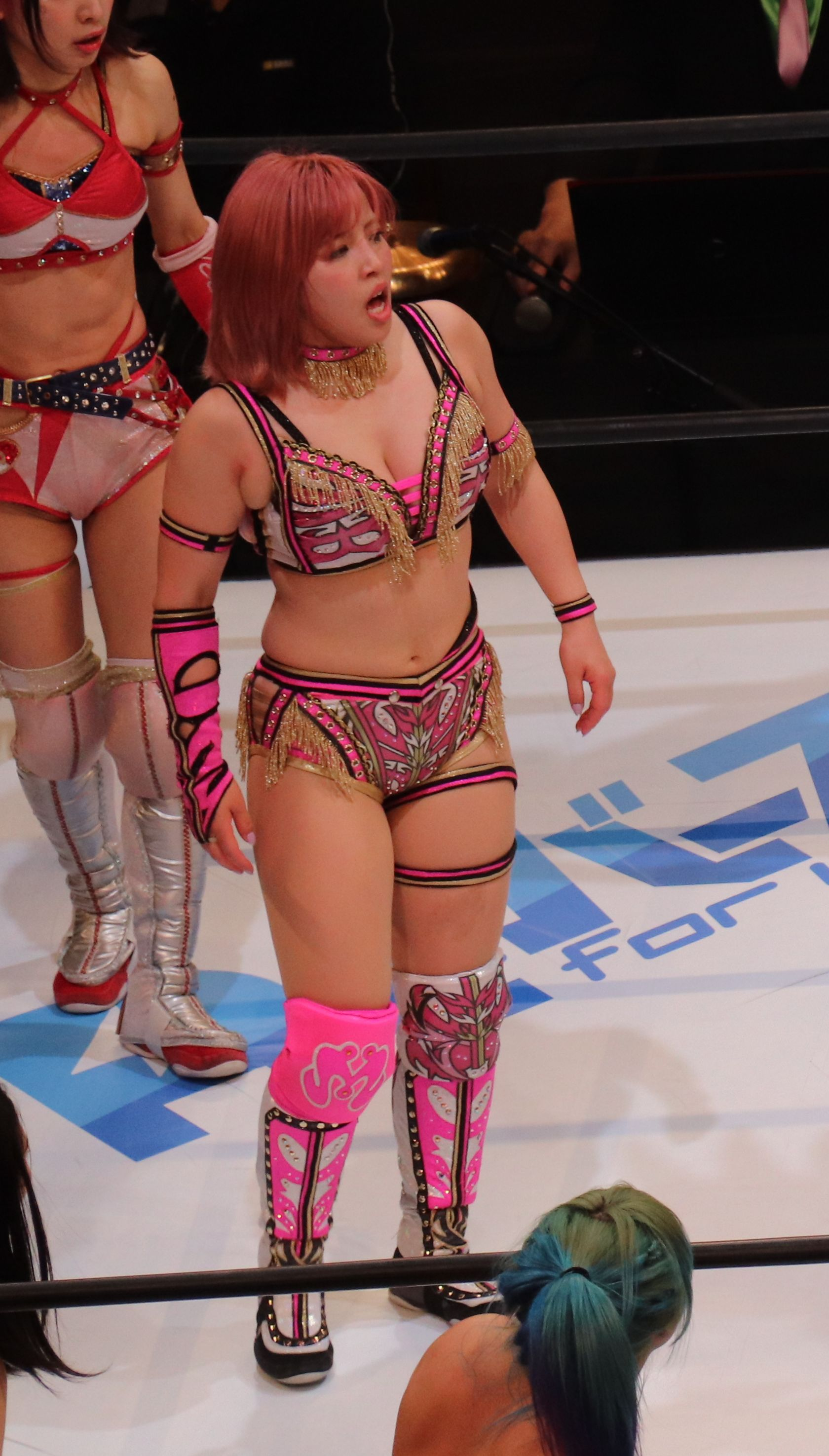
Shirakawa in March 2022

Shirakawa debuted in World Wonder Ring Stardom on October 3, 2020, at Yokohama Cinderella 2020, where she defeated Hanan. Shirakawa, Tam Nakano and Unagi Sayaka formed Cosmic Angels. At Road To Osaka Dream Cinderella on December 16, Cosmic Angels won the Artist of Stardom Championship by defeating Oedo Tai (Bea Priestley, Natsuko Tora and Saki Kashima).

At All Star Dream Cinderella on March 3, 2021, Shirakawa competed in a 24-women Stardom All Star Rumble where she faced various returning Stardom legends. Cosmic Angels feuded with Donna Del Mondo at the beginning of 2021. As a result, Shirakawa teamed up with Unagi Sayaka to unsuccessfully challenge Himeka and Maika for the Goddesses of Stardom Championship at New Century 2021 In Shinjuku on March 14. On the first night of the 2021 Cinderella Tournament on April 10, Shirakawa lost to Utami Hayashishita. Shirakawa won the Future of Stardom Championship at Yokohama Dream Cinderella 2021 in Summer on July 4 by defeating Unagi Sayaka in the finals of a tournament for the vacant title. Shirakawa participated in the Red Stars block of the 2021 5 Star Grand Prix. She scored a total of six points, which was not enough to advance to the finals. Shirakawa participated in the Blue Goddesses block of the 2021 Goddesses of Stardom Tag League with Tam Nakano as Dream H. They scored a total of three points, which was not enough to advance to the finals. At Tokyo Super Wars on November 27, Shirakawa unsuccessfully challenged Tam Nakano for the Wonder of Stardom Championship. At Osaka Super Wars on December 18, Shirakawa, Unagi Sayaka and Tam Nakano lost to Stars (Hazuki, Koguma and Mayu Iwatani) in a six-woman tag team match as part of a ¥10 Million Unit tournament. At Dream Queendom on December 29, Shirakawa, Mai Sakurai and Unagi Sayaka unsuccessfully challenged MaiHimePoi for the Artist of Stardom Championship.

At Nagoya Supreme Fight on January 29, 2022, Shirakawa lost to Thekla in a match for the vacant SWA World Championship. At Cinderella Journey on February 23, Shirakawa and Unagi Sayaka unsuccessfully challenged FWC for the Goddesses of Stardom Championship. Shirakawa participated in the 2022 Cinderella Tournament, in which she was eliminated in the first round on by Mirai on April 3.

At Dream Queendom 2 on December 29, 2022, Shirakawa was accompanied to the ring for her match by English wrestlers Mariah May and Xia Brookside. Shirakawa and her Cosmic Angels stablemate Unagi Sayaka went on to defeat Donna Del Mondo (Mai Sakurai and Thekla). Following the match, Shirakawa slapped Sayaka and announced the formation of Club Venus, a trio of herself, Brookside, and May. On the final night of the 2023 Cinderella Tournament on April 15, 2023, Shirakawa, Natsupoi, Saki and Tam Nakano lost to Donna Del Mondo (Giulia, Himeka, Maika and Thekla). Following the match, Shirakawa announced that Club Venus would part ways with Cosmic Angels and become an independent unit.

On April 23, 2023, at All Star Grand Queendom, Shirakawa won the Wonder of Stardom Championship by defeating Saya Kamitani. On May 4, Shirakawa had her first successful title defense by defeating Natsupoi. At Flashing Champions on May 27, Shirakawa lost the Wonder of Stardom Championship to Tam Nakano in a winner takes all match where Nakano's World of Stardom Championship was also on the line, ending Shirakawa's reign after 34 days. At Sunshine 2023 on June 25, Shirakawa and Mariah May, together known as Rose Gold, won the Goddesses of Stardom Championship by defeating The New Eras. At Stardom x Stardom: Osaka Summer Team on August 13, Rose Gold lost the Goddesses of Stardom Championship to REStart.

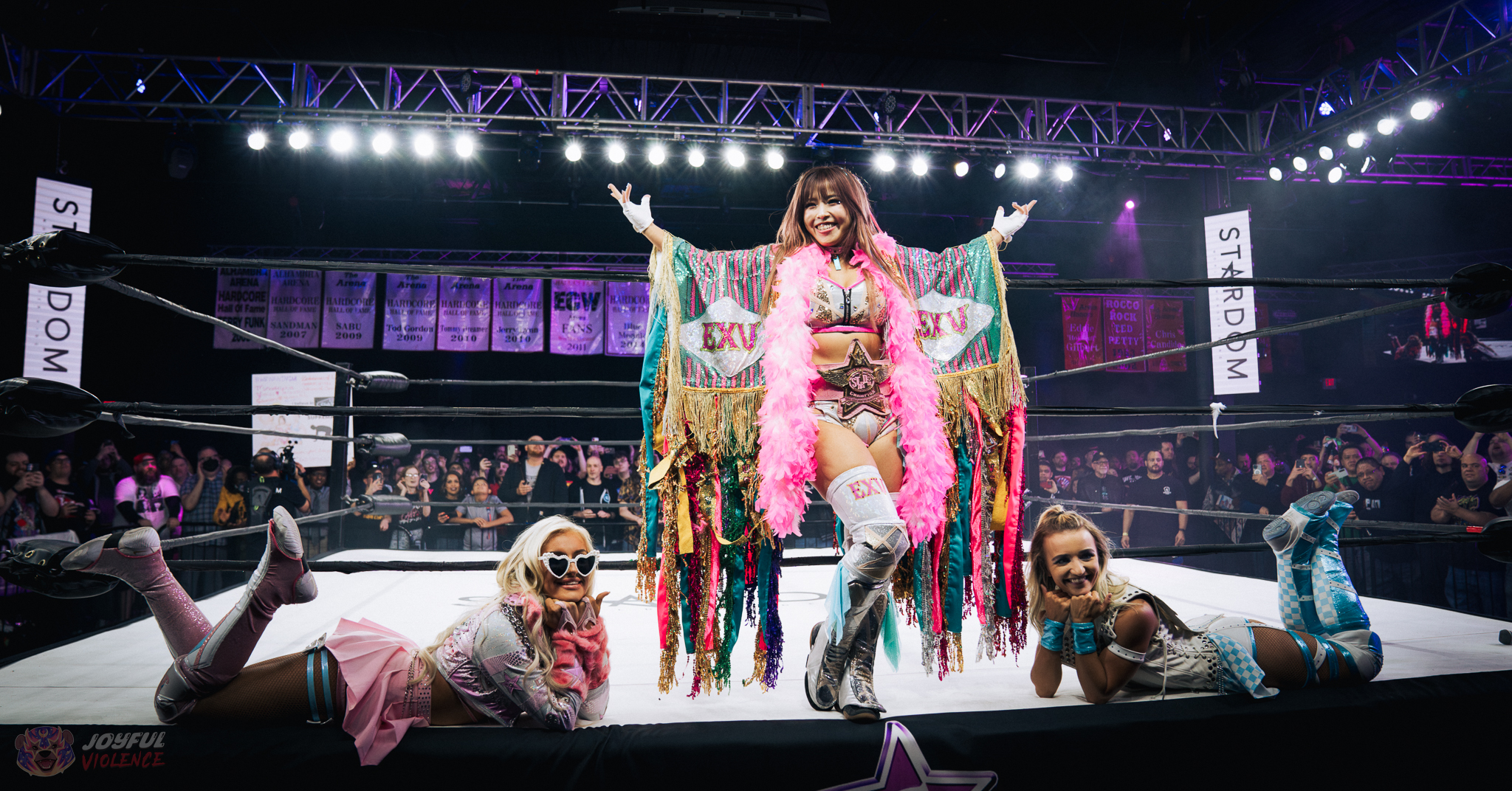
Shirakawa (center) with Club Venus members Mariah May and Xia Brookside at Stardom American Dream 2024

On January 20, 2024, Shirakawa, Hanako, Maika, Waka Tsukiyama and Xena reformed Club Venus into a new stable, with Shirakawa and Maika being the co-leaders. On January 27, the new stable was given the name Empress Nexus Venus. On March 30, Shirakawa, Maika and Xena won the Artist of Stardom Championship by defeating Abarenbo GE. On March 25, 2025, it was reported by Tokyo Sports that Shirakawa would be leaving Stardom at the end of the month and linked her to joining All Elite Wrestling (AEW) or WWE. On March 26 at a press conference, Shirakawa confirmed the report and announced that she would be joining AEW after finishing her final commitments with Stardom. On April 18 at Day 2 of Stardom American Dream 2025, Shirakawa and Raychell Rose lost a tag team match against Hazuki and Suzu Suzuki in what would be her final Stardom match.

=== New Japan Pro-Wrestling (2022–present) ===
Shirakawa made her New Japan Pro-Wrestling (NJPW) debut at Rumble on 44th Street on October 18, 2022, teaming with Waka Tsukiyama in a losing effort against Kylie Rae and Tiara James.

During night 1 of The New Beginning in Sapporo on February 23, 2024, Shirakawa returned to NJPW, unsuccessfully challenging Mayu Iwatani for the IWGP Women's Championship.

At Wrestle Dynasty on January 5, 2025, Shirakawa lost to Mercedes Moné in a Winner Takes All match where her Undisputed British Women's Championship and Moné's NJPW Strong Women's and AEW TBS titles were all on the line. On April 11, at Windy City Riot, Shirakawa competed against AZM to determine the number one contender for the Strong Women's Championship, however, the match ended in a double countout. This led to a three-way match on May 9, during the main event of Resurgence, with Moné defending the title, which ended with AZM walking away with the title.

=== All Elite Wrestling / Ring of Honor (2024–present) ===
Shirakawa made her ROH debut during Ring of Honor Wrestling on March 21, 2024, in a winning effort against Anna Jay. On April 5, at Supercard of Honor, in a Stardom showcase six-woman tag team match, Shirakwa teamed with Maika, her former ally in Empress Nexus Venus and Mei Seira to defeat the team of Tam Nakano and Queen's Quest (AZM and Saya Kamitani). Shirakawa made her debut for ROH's sister promotion All Elite Wrestling (AEW) on the April 11, 2024, episode of Dynamite, saving Mariah May after she was being attacked by Anna Jay. Shirakawa faced the AEW Women's World Champion "Timeless" Toni Storm at Forbidden Door, but Storm retained the title. After May won the AEW Women's World Championship, May turned on Shirakawa at Full Gear, leading to a match for the title at Dynamite: Winter is Coming on December 11, where she failed to win the title.

On March 26, 2025, Shirakawa confirmed that she would leave World Wonder Ring Stardom and join AEW after finishing her commitments with Stardom. She wrestled her first match as an AEW talent on May 14 at Dynamite: Beach Break, defeating Storm, AZM, and Skye Blue in a women's world title eliminator match, earning another shot against Storm for the women's world title that was later made official for May 25 at Double or Nothing. On May 25 at Double or Nothing, she failed to win the title from Storm. On July 2, during the 300th episode of Dynamite, Shirakawa challenged Mercedes Moné for the AEW TBS Championship, however, was unsuccessful. On July 11, 2025, at Supercard of Honor, Shirakawa defeated Miyu Yamashita, Persephone, and Yuka Sakazaki in a four-way match to become the interim ROH Women's World Television Champion, while lineal champion Red Velvet was out with injury. On August 29, during the main event of Death Before Dishonor, Shirakawa challenged Athena for the ROH Women's World Championship, however, was unsuccessful. At WrestleDream on October 18, Shirakawa answered an open challenge issued by Mercedes Moné, putting her Interim ROH Women's World Television Championship on the line in a Winner Takes All match alongside Moné's TBS Championship. Shirkawa was defeated in the match, ending her reign at 100 days. On November 12 at Blood & Guts, Shirakawa competed in the first ever women's Blood and Guts match, but her team was defeated. Shirakawa also formed a tag team with Toni Storm, known as the "Timeless Love Bombs", where they competed in a tournament to deterimine the inaugural AEW Women's World Tag Team Champions, They defeated Alex Windsor and Riho in the first round and Marina Shafir and Megan Bayne in the semi-finals, but lost to the Babes of Wrath (Willow Nightingale and Harley Cameron) in the grand finals.

== Professional wrestling style and persona ==
Shirakawa performed as a gravure model for a time in her 20s, and later incorporated this into her professional wrestling persona; she sometimes uses the monikers "The Fighting H-Cup Gravure Wrestler" and "The Venus of Pro Wrestling", the latter of which formed the concept for her team Club Venus.

Shirakawa has said that Jushin Thunder Liger inspired her to pursue a career in professional wrestling, which she began at the relatively late age of 31. Some of her signatures moves include a modified cradle pin called Glamorous Collection MINA, a driver called Figure Four Driver MINA, a hurricanrana/leg drop hybrid called Hurricane Leg Screw MINA, and a high-angle reverse DDT called Glamorous Driver MINA.

In AEW, Shirakawa is presented as sexually attracted to other women, notably shown through her affectionate and romantic interactions with Mariah May, including sharing a kiss and describing their relationship by saying "we love each other", as well as kissing Toni Storm following their match at Double or Nothing (2025).

== Championships and accomplishments ==
- Best Body Japan Pro-Wrestling
  - BBW Women's Championship (1 time, inaugural)
- Pro Wrestling Illustrated
  - Ranked No. 16 of the top 250 female wrestlers in the PWI Women's 250 in 2024
  - Ranked No. 26 of the top 250 female wrestlers in the PWI Women's 250 in 2025
- Revolution Pro Wrestling
  - Undisputed British Women's Championship (1 time)
- Ring of Honor
  - Interim ROH Women's World Television Championship (1 time)
- World Wonder Ring Stardom
  - Artist of Stardom Championship (2 times) – with Tam Nakano and Unagi Sayaka (1) Maika and Xena (1)
  - Future of Stardom Championship Tournament Winner (2021)
  - Future of Stardom Championship (1 time)
  - Goddesses of Stardom Championship (1 time) – with Mariah May
  - Wonder of Stardom Championship (1 time)
  - Stardom Year-End Award (1 times)
    - Special Merit Award (2024) shared with Saya Kamitani
