= Full Gear (2025) =

All Elite Wrestling pay-per-view event

- Promotional poster featuring various AEW personnel
- Promotion: All Elite Wrestling
- Date: November 22, 2025
- City: Newark, New Jersey
- Venue: Prudential Center
- Attendance: 10,485
- Buy rate: 140,000

Pay-per-view chronology
← Previous; WrestleDream	Next → Worlds End

Full Gear chronology
← Previous; 2024	Next → 2026

The 2025 Full Gear, also promoted as Full Gear presented by DC, was a professional wrestling pay-per-view (PPV) event produced by All Elite Wrestling (AEW). It was the seventh annual Full Gear and took place on November 22, 2025, at the Prudential Center in Newark, New Jersey. This was the second consecutive Full Gear held at the venue, following 2024, and the third overall, including 2022. It was the first AEW PPV presented by DC Comics.

Thirteen matches were contested at the event, including four on the "Tailgate Brawl" pre-show on TNT. In the event's final match, which was promoted as part of a double main event, Samoa Joe defeated "Hangman" Adam Page in a Steel Cage match to win his second AEW World Championship. The second main event, which was the penultimate match, saw Kris Statlander defeat Mercedes Moné to retain the AEW Women's World Championship. In other prominent matches, Mark Briscoe defeated Kyle Fletcher in a No Disqualification match to win the AEW TNT Championship, Ricochet pinned Kevin Knight in a Casino Gauntlet match to become the inaugural AEW National Champion, and FTR (Cash Wheeler and Dax Harwood) defeated Brodido (Brody King and Bandido) to win their record-tying third AEW World Tag Team Championship. The event also featured the return of Swerve Strickland following a three-month hiatus due to injury.

== Production ==
=== Background ===
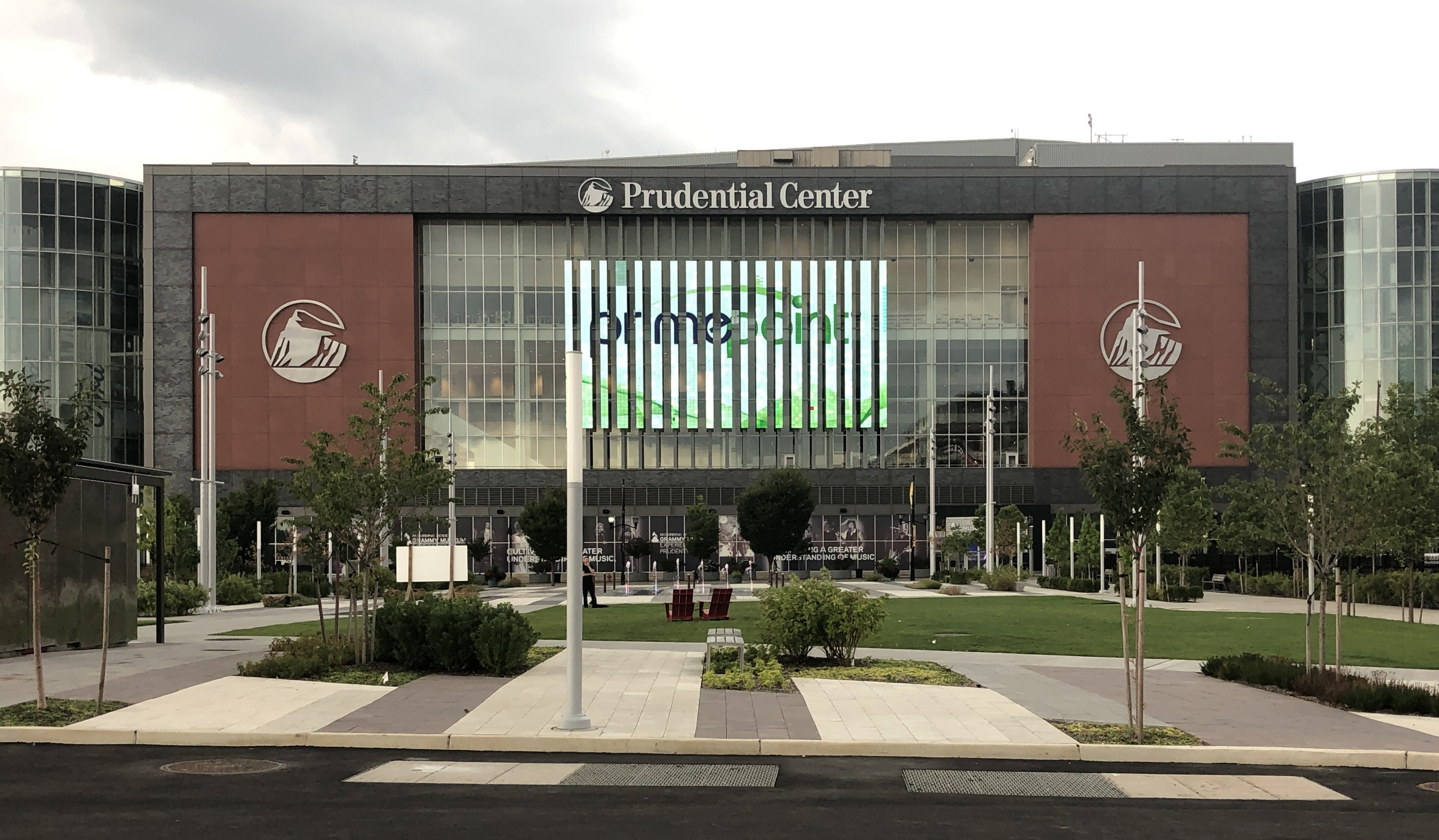
The 2025 Full Gear was held at the Prudential Center in Newark, New Jersey for a second consecutive year, and third overall after 2022 and 2024.

Full Gear is a professional wrestling pay-per-view (PPV) event held annually in November by All Elite Wrestling (AEW) since 2019. It is considered one of AEW's "Big Five", alongside Revolution, Double or Nothing, All In, and All Out, the promotion's five biggest events held annually. On August 4, 2025, AEW announced that the seventh annual Full Gear would take place on Saturday, November 22 at the Prudential Center in Newark, New Jersey. This was the second consecutive Full Gear held at the venue, following 2024, and the third overall, including 2022. Tickets for Full Gear went on sale on August 25. The event was sponsored by DC Comics, following the announcement of a partnership between DC and AEW which includes the release of AEW-themed comic books.

=== Broadcast outlets ===
Full Gear aired via PPV through traditional cable and satellite providers. In the United States, AEW PPV events are also available on HBO Max at an exclusive discounted rate for subscribers. The event was also available in the United States and internationally on Prime Video, Triller TV, PPV.com, and YouTube. Additionally in the United States, the show was broadcast at Dave & Buster's and Tom's Watch Bar locations.

=== Storylines ===
Other on-screen personnel
Role	Name
Commentators	Excalibur (Pre-show and PPV)
Commentators	Tony Schiavone (Pre-show and PPV)
Commentators	Nigel McGuinness (Pre-show and PPV)
Commentators	Bryan Danielson (PPV)
Commentators	Dalton Castle ($200,000 Four-way tag match)
Commentators	Paul Wight (Boom & Doom vs. RPG Vice)
Commentators	Don Callis (Boom & Doom vs. RPG Vice, all Trios, and TNT Title matches)
Spanish commentators	Carlos Cabrera
Spanish commentators	Alvaro Riojas
Spanish commentators	Ariel Levy
Ring announcers	Arkady Aura (Pre-show and PPV)
Ring announcers	Justin Roberts (PPV)
Referees	Aubrey Edwards
Referees	Brandon Martinez
Referees	Bryce Remsburg
Referees	Mike Posey
Referees	Paul Turner
Referees	Rick Knox
Referees	Stephon Smith
Interviewers	Lexy Nair
Interviewers	Alex Marvez
Pre-show hosts	Renee Paquette
Pre-show hosts	RJ City
Pre-show hosts	Jeff Jarrett

Full Gear featured 13 professional wrestling matches, including four on the pre-show, that involved different wrestlers from pre-existing feuds and storylines. Storylines were produced on AEW's weekly television programs, Dynamite and Collision.

At the 2024 Full Gear, Mercedes Moné defeated Kris Statlander to retain the AEW TBS Championship. At the 2025 WrestleDream, following Statlander's successful defence of her recently won AEW Women's World Championship, she was interrupted by Moné, who was next scheduled to defend the TBS Championship. Moné ordered Statlander to leave "her" ring and Statlander begrudgingly complied. Following Moné's successful title defence, however, Statlander returned to the ring and attacked Moné. Moné subsequently challenged Statlander to a match for her AEW Women's World Championship; Statlander accepted, and the match was made official for Full Gear.

During the Dynamite 6th Anniversary Show on October 1, AEW World Champion "Hangman" Adam Page teamed with two-thirds of the AEW World Trios Champions The Opps (Samoa Joe and Powerhouse Hobbs) to defeat the Death Riders (Jon Moxley, Claudio Castagnoli, and Daniel Garcia) in a trios match. Following the match, an argument ensued between Page and Joe, with Joe accusing Page of stealing his tag-in and trying to show him up during the match. Joe then vehemently stated that Page has never beaten him in the past, before striking Page in the face. This led to Page challenging Joe to a match at WrestleDream for Page's World Championship, which Joe accepted. There, Page defeated Joe to retain his championship. Following the match, The Opps (Joe, Hobbs, and Katsuyori Shibata) attacked Page, turning heel. At Fright Night Dynamite on October 29, Joe defeated Bobby Lashley, Hook, and Ricochet in a Fright Night four-way match to determine the number one contender for the AEW World Championship and challenge Page for the title at Full Gear. At Blood & Guts on November 12, Page defeated Hobbs in a Falls Count Anywhere match but was attacked by the rest of the Opps as the Blood and Guts steel cage was lowered. However, Eddie Kingston and Hook arrived to assist Page. Page then challenged Joe to have their title match inside a steel cage, which Joe accepted.

At Fright Night Dynamite, FTR (Cash Wheeler and Dax Harwood) defeated JetSpeed (Kevin Knight and "Speedball" Mike Bailey), Jurassic Express ("Jungle" Jack Perry and Luchasaurus), and The Young Bucks (Matt Jackson and Nick Jackson) in a Fright Night four-way tag team match to become the number one contender for the AEW World Tag Team Championship and earn the right to challenge Brodido (Bandido and Brody King) for the title at Full Gear.

At WrestleDream, Kyle Fletcher retained the TNT Championship against Mark Briscoe. On the November 5 episode of Dynamite, Briscoe challenged Fletcher to a No Disqualification match for the TNT Championship at Full Gear, Fletcher's manager, Don Callis proposed another stipulation for the match: If Briscoe loses, he'll be forced to join the Don Callis Family. Briscoe accepted and the match was made official later that night.

On November 5, AEW President, Tony Khan announced the creation of a new championship, the AEW National Championship. It was announced that the inaugural champion would be decided in a Casino Gauntlet match. After some back and forth on Dynamite it was announced that Bobby Lashley, Shelton Benjamin, and Ricochet would be participants in the match. Three nights later on Collision, JetSpeed (Kevin Knight and "Speedball" Mike Bailey) in an interview announced that they would be participants as well.

At Blood and Guts in the Men's Blood and Guts match, Kyle O'Reilly made Jon Moxley submit, thus giving his team the win. On the following Dynamite, Death Riders (Moxley and Claudio Castagnoli) defeated Roderick Strong and O'Reilly stablemate of The Conglomeration Orange Cassidy in a tag team match. After that, O'Reilly came out and attacked Moxley, and O'Reilly subsequently challenged Moxley to a No Holds Barred match at Full Gear, which was subsequently made official later that night.

== Results ==
No.	Results	Stipulations	Times
1^{P}	Bang Bang Gang (Austin Gunn and Juice Robinson) (with Ace Austin) defeated Max Caster and Anthony Bowens, Big Bill and Bryan Keith, and The Outrunners (Truth Magnum and Turbo Floyd) (with Dalton Castle) by pinfall	$200,000 Four-way tag team match The winners received a $200,000 cash prize.	7:30
2^{P}	Boom & Doom ("Big Boom!" A.J. and Q. T. Marshall) (with Aaron Solo, Big Justice, and The Rizzler) defeated RPG Vice (Rocky Romero and Trent Beretta) (with Don Callis) by pinfall	Tag team match	12:00
3^{P}	Eddie Kingston and Hook defeated The WorkHorsemen (Anthony Henry and JD Drake) by pinfall	Tag team match	1:50
4^{P}	El Sky Team (Místico, Máscara Dorada, and Neón) (c) (with Alex Abrahantes) defeated The Don Callis Family (Kazuchika Okada, Konosuke Takeshita, and Hechicero) (with Don Callis) by submission (Note: This match concluded on the main card.)	Trios match for the CMLL World Trios Championship	13:45
5	Pac defeated Darby Allin by pinfall	Singles match	16:55
6	Timeless Love Bombs ("Timeless" Toni Storm and Mina Shirakawa) defeated Babes of Wrath (Willow Nightingale and Harley Cameron), Sisters of Sin (Julia Hart and Skye Blue), and Megan Bayne and Marina Shafir (with Penelope Ford) by pinfall	Four-way tag team match The winning team chose the stipulation for their semifinal match in the inaugural AEW Women's World Tag Team Championship tournament.	13:15
7	FTR (Cash Wheeler and Dax Harwood) (with Stokely) defeated Brodido (Bandido and Brody King) (c) by pinfall	Tag team match for the AEW World Tag Team Championship	20:05
8	Ricochet won by pinning Kevin Knight (Note: Order of entrants: Bobby Lashley, Shelton Benjamin, Ricochet, Claudio Castagnoli, Daniel Garcia, Orange Cassidy, Wheeler Yuta, Kevin Knight, Roderick Strong, Mark Davis, "Speedball" Mike Bailey, and "Daddy Magic" Matt Menard)	12-man Casino Gauntlet match for the inaugural AEW National Championship	22:35
9	Kyle O'Reilly defeated Jon Moxley (with Marina Shafir) by submission	No Holds Barred match	20:30
10	Mark Briscoe defeated Kyle Fletcher (c) (with Don Callis) by pinfall	No Disqualification match for the AEW TNT Championship; Had Briscoe lost, he would have been forced to join The Don Callis Family.	25:00
11	Josh Alexander and The Young Bucks (Matt Jackson and Nick Jackson) (with Don Callis) defeated Kenny Omega and Jurassic Express ("Jungle" Jack Perry and Luchasaurus) by pinfall	$1,000,000 Trios match The winners received a $1,000,000 cash prize.	19:10
12	Kris Statlander (c) defeated Mercedes Moné by pinfall	Singles match for the AEW Women's World Championship	23:05
13	Samoa Joe defeated "Hangman" Adam Page (c) by pinfall	Steel Cage match for the AEW World Championship	16:00
(c) / – the champion(s) heading into the match; P / – the match was broadcast on the pre-show
