= Full Gear (2024) =

All Elite Wrestling pay-per-view event

- Promotional poster featuring various AEW wrestlers
- Promotion: All Elite Wrestling
- Date: November 23, 2024
- City: Newark, New Jersey
- Venue: Prudential Center
- Attendance: 10,094
- Buy rate: 113,000

Pay-per-view chronology
← Previous; WrestleDream	Next → Worlds End

Full Gear chronology
← Previous; 2023	Next → 2025

The 2024 Full Gear was a professional wrestling pay-per-view (PPV) event produced by All Elite Wrestling (AEW). It was the sixth annual Full Gear and took place on November 23, 2024, at the Prudential Center in Newark, New Jersey, marking the second Full Gear held at the venue, after 2022.

Twelve matches were contested at the event, including three on the "Zero Hour" pre-show. In the main event, Jon Moxley defeated Orange Cassidy to retain the AEW World Championship. In other prominent matches, Bobby Lashley defeated Swerve Strickland by technical submission, Kyle Fletcher defeated Will Ospreay, MJF defeated Roderick Strong by submission, and Daniel Garcia defeated Jack Perry by submission to win the AEW TNT Championship.

== Production ==
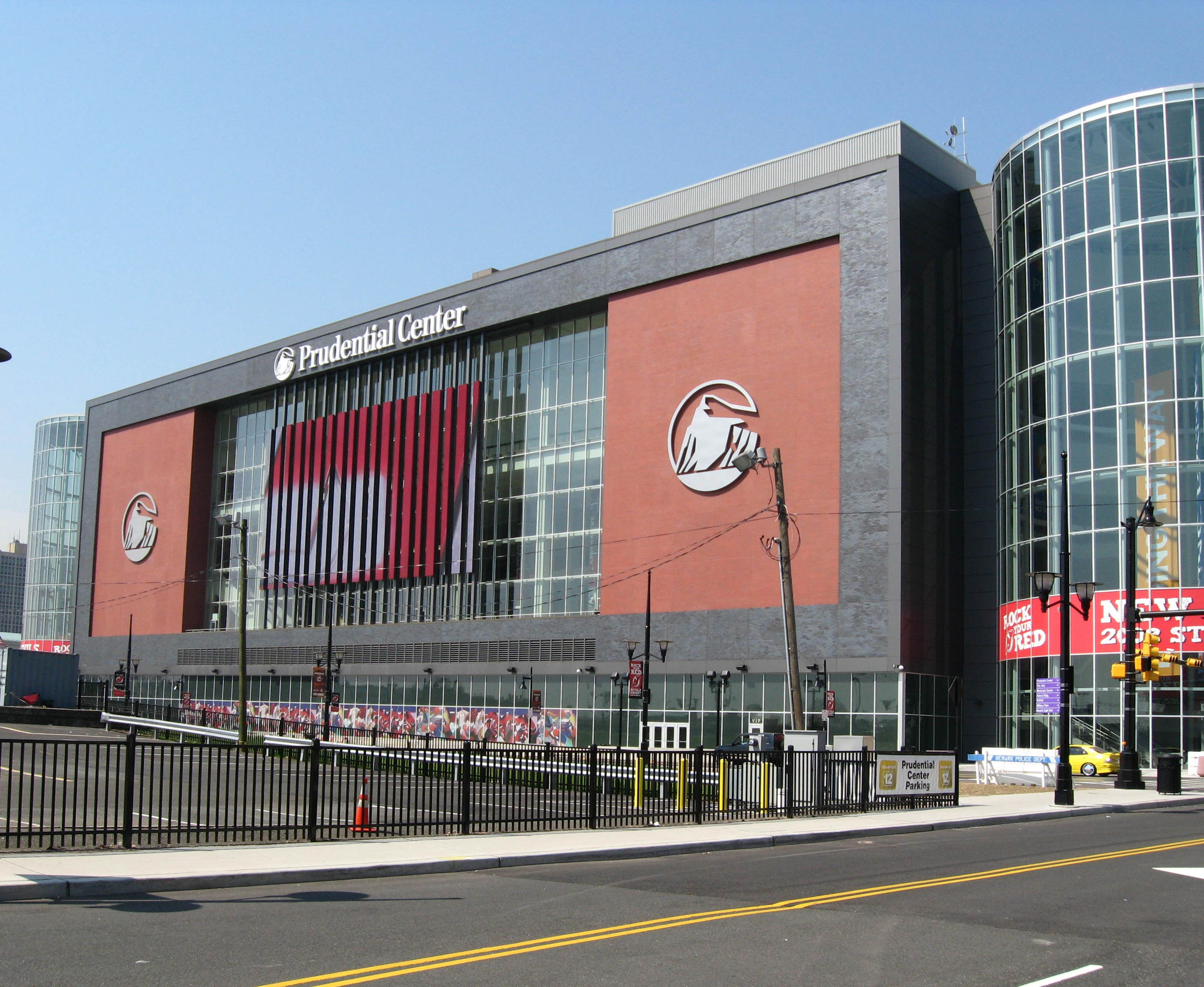
The event was held at the Prudential Center in Newark, New Jersey, marking the second Full Gear held at the venue, after 2022.

=== Background ===
Full Gear is a professional wrestling pay-per-view (PPV) event held annually in November by All Elite Wrestling (AEW) since 2019, generally around the week of Veterans Day. It is one of AEW's "Big Five" PPVs, which includes Double or Nothing, All In, All Out, and Revolution, their five biggest pay-per-view events produced throughout the year. Out of the five, Full Gear is AEW's only pay-per-view to be traditionally held on a Saturday. On April 11, 2024, AEW announced that the sixth Full Gear event would take place on November 23, 2024, at the Prudential Center in Newark, New Jersey, marking the second Full Gear held at the venue, after 2022.

=== Storylines ===
Full Gear featured professional wrestling matches that were the result of pre-existing feuds and storylines, with results being predetermined by AEW's writers. Storylines were produced on AEW's weekly television programs, Dynamite, Collision, and Rampage. To promote the event, AEW produced and aired a full-length video package set to the Guns N' Roses song "November Rain", reviving a practice undertaken by Extreme Championship Wrestling (ECW) to promote its own November to Remember series of PPVs in the 1990s.

At WrestleDream on October 12, Jon Moxley defeated Bryan Danielson to win the AEW World Championship for the fourth time. After the match, Moxley and his Blackpool Combat Club stablemates attacked Danielson despite Darby Allin, Private Party (Isiah Kassidy and Marq Quen), and Jeff Jarrett trying to save Danielson. Eventually, Orange Cassidy and most of the AEW locker room came to Danielson's rescue causing Moxley and his stablemates to retreat. The BCC were soon after renamed Death Riders. On the October 23 episode of Dynamite, Moxley and his stablemates attacked Cassidy's former Best Friends stablemate Chuck Taylor before Moxley's stablemates placed a steel chair around Taylor's neck which Moxley stomped on. Cassidy then ran out, with most of the AEW locker room, to Taylor causing Moxley and his stablemates to retreat. At Fright Night Dynamite on October 30, Cassidy opened the show and challenged Moxley to a match for his championship at Full Gear, which was later made official.

On the October 23 episode of Dynamite, Adam Cole was interrupted by Roderick Strong, Matt Taven, and Mike Bennett. Strong said when Cole came to them with the idea to take out MJF, they immediately said yes because they were real friends. He said they needed to finish the job on MJF. Cole once again challenged MJF to come out, but was greeted by another video package. MJF reiterated that he would not be facing Cole, but did lay out terms for a potential match. He said he would face Cole or Strong, and all they had to do was win three matches. Whoever won their three matches first would get to face him at Full Gear. At Fright Night Dynamite, Cole defeated Buddy Matthews in his first match since September 2023. The following week on Dynamite, he defeated Matthews' House of Black stablemate Malakai Black. Meanwhile, on the November 2 episode of Collision, Strong defeated Shane Taylor. The next week, Strong would defeat The Beast Mortos. On the November 13 episode of Dynamite, Cole would lose to Konosuke Takeshita while Strong would defeat Lance Archer in a Falls Count Anywhere match. As a result, Strong was scheduled to take on MJF at the event.

At WrestleDream, Daniel Garcia returned and confronted Jack Perry, who had just defeated Katsuyori Shibata to retain his AEW TNT Championship only to be confronted himself by a returning MJF. While Garcia's back was turned, Perry hit him with the title belt and walked away. On the November 9 episode of Collision, Perry defeated Action Andretti to retain the TNT Championship. Garcia then confronted Perry once again and challenged him to a match at Full Gear with the championship on the line to which Perry accepted.

On the October 4 episode of Rampage, Kris Statlander was confronted by Mercedes Moné and her bodyguard Kamille with Moné insulting Statlander. At Fright Night Dynamite, Statlander defeated Kamille only for Moné to attack Statlander from behind. A match between the two was later made official for Full Gear with Moné's AEW TBS Championship on the line.

At WrestleDream on October 12, Jay White defeated "Hangman" Adam Page. The following week on Collision, a rematch was set up for Full Gear.

On October 28, AEW announced on X that social media personality and former wrestler "Big Boom!" A.J., with his son Big Justice in his corner, would wrestle Q. T. Marshall on the Zero Hour show. On the November 20 episode of Dynamite, Big Justice announced that his friend and fellow social media personality The Rizzler would serve as the special guest timekeeper for the match.

On the July 10 episode of Dynamite, Mariah May, who was the protégé of then-AEW Women's World Champion "Timeless" Toni Storm, won the 2024 Women's Owen Hart Cup (along with an AEW Women's World Championship match) and turned heel on Storm. May then defeated Storm for the AEW Women's World Championship at All In on August 25. May later announced that she would celebrate her title win only when her friend and tag team partner Mina Shirakawa returned. On the November 16 episode of Collision, after successfully defending her title against Anna Jay, May reunited with Shirakawa once again, and May's champagne title celebration with Shirakawa was set for Full Gear.

== Event ==
Other on-screen personnel
Role	Name
Commentators	Excalibur (Pre-show and PPV)
Commentators	Tony Schiavone (Pre-show and PPV)
Commentators	Nigel McGuinness (PPV)
Commentators	Jim Ross (last 2 matches)
Commentators	Matt Menard (Pre-show and TNT title match)
Commentators	Paul Wight ("Big Boom" A.J. vs. Q. T. Marshall)
Commentators	Don Callis (Will Ospreay vs. Kyle Fletcher and International title match)
Spanish Commentators	Carlos Cabrera
Spanish Commentators	Alvaro Riojas
Spanish Commentators	Ariel Levy
Ring announcers	Justin Roberts
Ring announcers	Arkady Aura
Referees	Aubrey Edwards
Referees	Bryce Remsburg
Referees	Mike Posey
Referees	Paul Turner
Referees	Rick Knox
Referees	Stephon Smith
Interviewer	Lexy Nair
Pre-show hosts	Renee Paquette
Pre-show hosts	RJ City
Pre-show hosts	Jeff Jarrett
Pre-show hosts	Paul Walter Hauser
Special Guest Timekeeper	The Rizzler (AJ vs. Marshall)

=== Zero Hour ===
In the opening match of the Zero Hour show Deonna Purrazzo faced off against Anna Jay. In the end, Purrazzo had an armbar on Jay but Jay rolled Purrazzo up for the win.

Backstage Lexy Nair interviewed Billie Starkz about the upcoming International Women's Cup but was interrupted by Red Velvet, Leyla Hirsch and ROH Women's World Champion Athena.

Next, Dante Martin, The Beast Mortos, Komander, Buddy Matthews faced each other in a Four-way match. In the end, Matthews performed a double diving foot stomp on Martin for the victory.

After that, "Big Boom!" A.J. (with his son Big Justice) and QT Marshall (with The Ace of Space Academy) were scheduled to face off but before that Paul Wight, who was also going to provide commentary during the match, brought out The Rizzler to be the special guest timekeeper. In the end, while AJ was incapacitated in the ring, Marshall approached The Rizzler but Wight got up from the commentary table and confronted Marshall which made Marshall go back into the ring. Aaron Solo then ran into the ring to distract AJ but AJ knocked him down, as the referee was tending to a knocked down Solo, Big Justice got into the ring and speared Marshall then the referee turned around and AJ got up and powerbombed Marshall for the victory.

Backstage, Mercedes Moné scolded her bodyguard Kamille and told her not to accompany for her upcoming AEW TBS Championship defense against Kris Statlander later in the night.

=== Main show ===
In the opening match on the main show, Private Party (Isiah Kassidy and Marq Quen) defended their AEW World Tag Team Championships against The Outrunners (Truth Magnum and Turbo Floyd), Kings of the Black Throne (Malakai Black and Brody King), and The Acclaimed (Anthony Bowens and Max Caster). In the end. In the end. The Outrunners hit the Total Recall on King and attempted to pin King but Caster broke it up. Both Acclaimed members ended up being the legal man, Caster laid down and asked Bowens to pin him but Bowens refused. After getting attacked by the other teams, Caster called for Bowens to hit The Arrival, which he hit on Kassidy and as Cassidy was about to hit The Mic Drop Floyd interrupted him on top of the turnbuckle but was shoved away but Private Party capitalised and hit the Gin and Juice on Caster to retain their tag titles.

Backstage, Renee Paquette was interviewing Orange Cassidy who said he would take the symbol of everything AEW represents and take it out of Moxley's briefcase and put it in his backpack.

Next, MJF took on Roderick Strong. In the end, after working on Strong's arm throughout the match, MJF applied the Salt of the Earth to Strong who tapped out. After the match, MJF got a steel chair but was interrupted by Adam Cole as well as Matt Taven, Mike Bennett and Kyle O'Reilly and MJF retreated out of the ring. O'Reilly, frustrated, shoved Adam Cole and help Strong to his feet.

After that, Mercedes Moné defended her AEW TBS Championship against Kris Statlander. In the end, Statlander was trying to hit the Saturday Night Fever but Moné bit Statlander's knee and rolled Statlander up for the three count and retaining her championship in the process.

Up next, was "Hangman" Adam Page taking on Jay White. In the end, White hit the Blade Runner on Page for the win.

Next, Will Ospreay took on Kyle Fletcher. In the end, Fletcher hit a jumping tombstone piledriver off the apron onto the steel ringside stairs on Ospreay and rolled him into the ring and hit a grimstone. Ospreay hit Fletcher with a lariat but Fletcher hit Ospreay with a top rope brainbuster for the win.

After that, Mariah May had her championship celebration and she brought out Mina Shirakawa. Towards the end of the celebration, May attempted to swing a glass bottle at Shirakawa but Shirakawa dodged it and attacked May sending both women through a table off the stage.

Up next, Jack Perry defended his AEW TNT Championship against Daniel Garcia. Matt Menard joined commentary for the match before the entrances. In the end, Garcia delivered a piledriver to Perry and applied The Dragon Tamer to Perry who tapped out thus Garcia won the match and the TNT title.

Next, Konosuke Takeshita, with Don Callis, defended his AEW International Championship against Ricochet. Don Callis joined commentary before the match. In the end, Takeshita hit Ricochet from the top rope and pinned him for the win and to retain his title.

In the penultimate match, Swerve Strickland, with Prince Nana took on Bobby Lashley, with MVP and Shelton Benjamin. In the end, Lashley applied the Hurt Lock to Strickland who passed out, giving Lashley the victory. After the match, Lashley put Nana in the Hurt Lock and laid both men out in the ring.

=== Main Event ===
In the main event, Jon Moxley defended his AEW World Championship against Orange Cassidy. In the end, Wheeler Yuta came into the ring when the referee's back was turned and hit Cassidy with a running knee strike and then Moxley hit Cassidy with the Death Rider for the victory and to retain his title.

After the match, Yuta and Moxley attacked Cassidy and poured bleach down his throat until Adam Page showed up and attacked Yuta. Page and Moxley stared each other down until Christian Cage, who still holds the AEW World Championship contract that he won back at All In attacked Moxley and hit the Kill Switch. Jay White then ambushed Cage and Page and hit Cage with the Blade Runner. Pac and Claudio Castagnoli then entered the ring and attacked White before carrying Moxley away. In the parking lot, the Death Riders were trying to get into a vehicle until someone crashed into that vehicle before the Death Riders commandeered a different vehicle and drove away. The person who crashed was revealed to be Darby Allin who vowed to end Jon Moxley.

== Results ==
No.	Results	Stipulations	Times
1^{P}	Anna Jay defeated Deonna Purrazzo (with Taya Valkyrie) by pinfall	Singles match	7:00
2^{P}	Buddy Matthews defeated Dante Martin, Komander (with Alex Abrahantes), and The Beast Mortos by pinfall	Four-way match	10:35
3^{P}	"Big Boom!" A.J. (with Big Justice and The Rizzler) defeated Q. T. Marshall (with The Ace of Space Academy) by pinfall	Singles match The Rizzler served as special guest timekeeper.	11:45
4	Private Party (Isiah Kassidy and Marq Quen) (c) defeated The Outrunners (Truth Magnum and Turbo Floyd), Kings of the Black Throne (Malakai Black and Brody King), and The Acclaimed (Anthony Bowens and Max Caster) by pinfall	Four-way tag team match for the AEW World Tag Team Championship	13:25
5	MJF defeated Roderick Strong by submission	Singles match	13:40
6	Mercedes Moné (c) defeated Kris Statlander by pinfall	Singles match for the AEW TBS Championship	19:25
7	Jay White defeated "Hangman" Adam Page by pinfall	Singles match	19:55
8	Kyle Fletcher defeated Will Ospreay by pinfall	Singles match	24:15
9	Daniel Garcia defeated Jack Perry (c) by submission	Singles match for the AEW TNT Championship	18:25
10	Konosuke Takeshita (c) defeated Ricochet by pinfall	Singles match for the AEW International Championship	19:15
11	Bobby Lashley (with MVP and Shelton Benjamin) defeated Swerve Strickland (with Prince Nana) by technical submission	Singles match	13:35
12	Jon Moxley (c) (with Marina Shafir) defeated Orange Cassidy by pinfall	Singles match for the AEW World Championship	19:20
(c) / – the champion(s) heading into the match; P / – the match was broadcast on the pre-show

=== AEW World Tag Team Championship Full Gear Four-Way Contender Series brackets ===
Qualifiers; Collision (November 9, 16); Dynamite (November 13)
Private Party (Isiah Kassidy and Marq Quen) (c)	Bye
–	–
The Outrunners (Truth Magnum and Turbo Floyd)	Pin
Top Flight (Darius Martin and Dante Martin)	10:17
FTR (Dax Harwood and Cash Wheeler)	13:40
Kings of the Black Throne (Malakai Black and Brody King)	Pin
La Facción Ingobernable (Rush and The Beast Mortos)	11:15
The Acclaimed (Anthony Bowens and Max Caster)	Pin

Final; Full Gear (November 23)
Private Party (Isiah Kassidy and Marq Quen) (c)	Pin
The Outrunners (Truth Magnum and Turbo Floyd)	—
Kings of the Black Throne (Malakai Black and Brody King)	—
The Acclaimed (Anthony Bowens and Max Caster)	13:25
