= Fright Night Dynamite (2025) =

All Elite Wrestling television special

- Promotional poster featuring The Young Bucks (Matt Jackson and Nick Jackson), Mercedes Moné, Thekla, and Ricochet
- Promotion: All Elite Wrestling
- Date: October 29, 2025
- City: Edinburg, Texas
- Venue: Bert Ogden Arena
- Attendance: 2,888

Fright Night Dynamite chronology
← Previous; 2024	Next → 2026

AEW Dynamite special episodes chronology
← Previous; Title Tuesday	Next → Blood & Guts

The 2025 Fright Night Dynamite was a professional wrestling television special produced by All Elite Wrestling (AEW). It was the second annual Fright Night Dynamite event and took place on October 29, 2025, at the Bert Ogden Arena in Edinburg, Texas. The event was broadcast live as a special episode of AEW's flagship weekly television program, Wednesday Night Dynamite, simulcast on TBS and HBO Max. The event marked the commencement of the tournament to crown the inaugural AEW Women's World Tag Team Champions.

== Production ==
=== Background ===
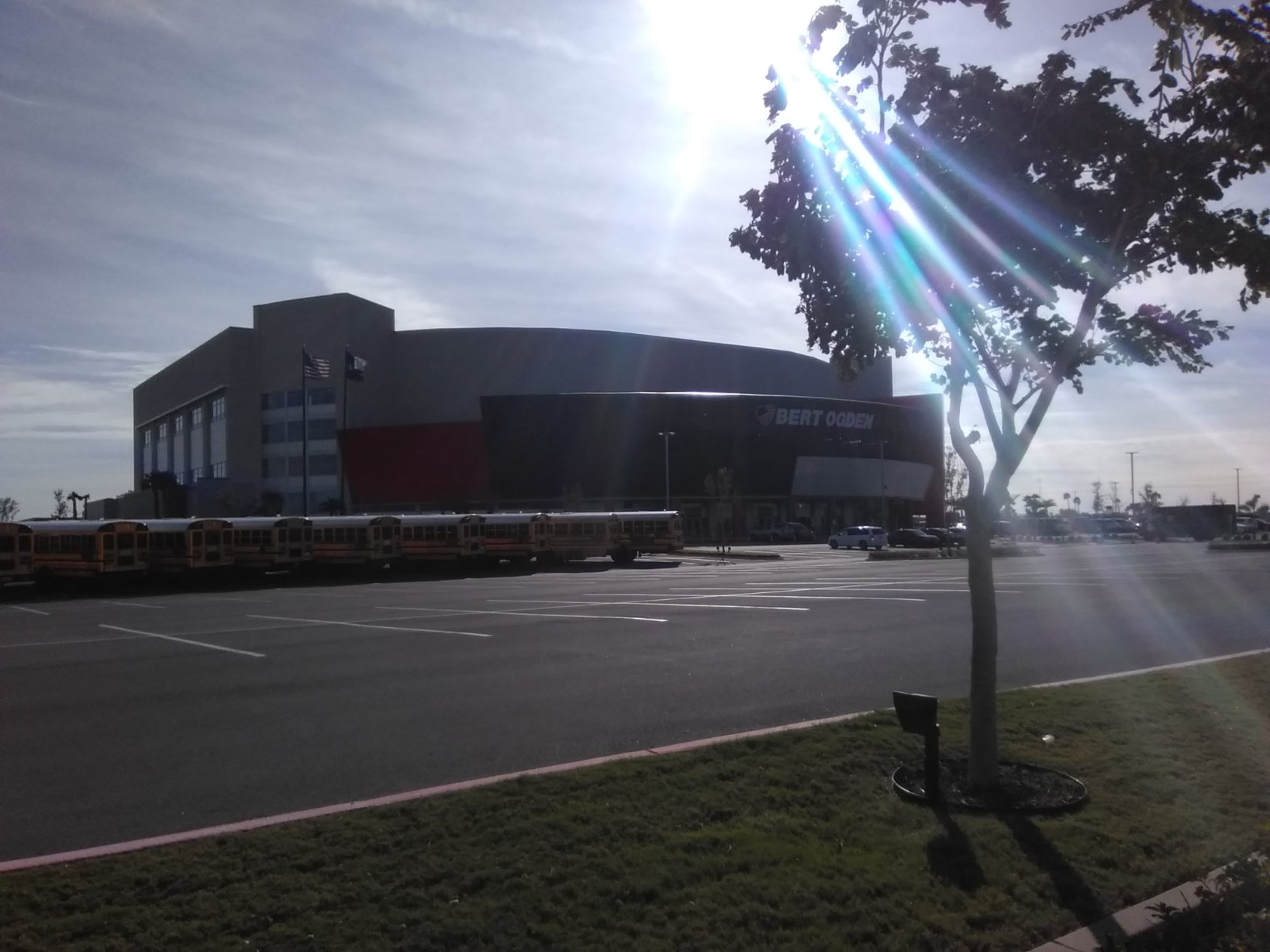
The 2025 Fright Night Dynamite will be held at the Bert Ogden Arena in Edinburg, Texas.

Fright Night Dynamite is an annual professional wrestling television special produced by the American promotion All Elite Wrestling (AEW) since 2024. The event airs as a Halloween-themed special episode of the company's flagship weekly program, Wednesday Night Dynamite.

On September 8, 2025, AEW announced that the October 29 episode of Dynamite would be held at the Bert Ogden Arena in Edinburg, Texas and would air live being simulcast on TBS and HBO Max. Tickets for the event went on sale on September 15. This will be AEW's second event at the venue, following the February 2, 2024 episode of Collision.

=== Storylines ===
Fright Night Dynamite featured professional wrestling matches that involve different wrestlers from pre-existing scripted feuds and storylines. Storylines are produced on AEW's weekly television programs, Dynamite and Collision.

On the October 25 episode of Collision, a four-way match was announced between Bobby Lashley, Ricochet, Hook, and Samoa Joe, with the winner facing "Hangman" Adam Page for the AEW World Championship at Full Gear.

Also on the October 25 episode of Collision, a four-way tag team match was announced between The Young Bucks (Matt Jackson and Nick Jackson), JetSpeed (Kevin Knight and "Speedball" Mike Bailey), FTR (Cash Wheeler and Dax Harwood), and Jurassic Express ("Jungle" Jack Perry and Luchasaurus), with the winners facing Brodido (Bandido and Brody King) for the AEW World Tag Team Championship at Full Gear.

== Results ==
No.	Results	Stipulations	Times
1	Orange Cassidy and Darby Allin defeated Death Riders (Wheeler Yuta and Daniel Garcia) by pinfall	Trick or Treat tornado tag team match	13:30
2	FTR (Cash Wheeler and Dax Harwood) defeated The Young Bucks (Matt Jackson and Nick Jackson), JetSpeed (Kevin Knight and "Speedball" Mike Bailey), and Jurassic Express ("Jungle" Jack Perry and Luchasaurus) by pinfall	Four-way tag team match to determine the #1 contender to the AEW World Tag Team Championship; The winners faced Brodido (Bandido and Brody King) at Full Gear.	13:45
3	Jon Moxley (with Marina Shafir) vs. Kyle O'Reilly ended in a no contest	Singles match	12:00
4	Sisters of Sin (Skye Blue and Julia Hart) defeated Queen Aminata and Jamie Hayter by pinfall	Inaugural AEW Women's World Tag Team Championship tournament quarterfinal	10:00
5	Samoa Joe defeated Bobby Lashley, Ricochet, and Hook by submission	Four-way match to determine the #1 contender to the AEW World Championship; The winner faced "Hangman" Adam Page at Full Gear.	11:55
