= A.J. & Big Justice =

American father-and-son social media duo

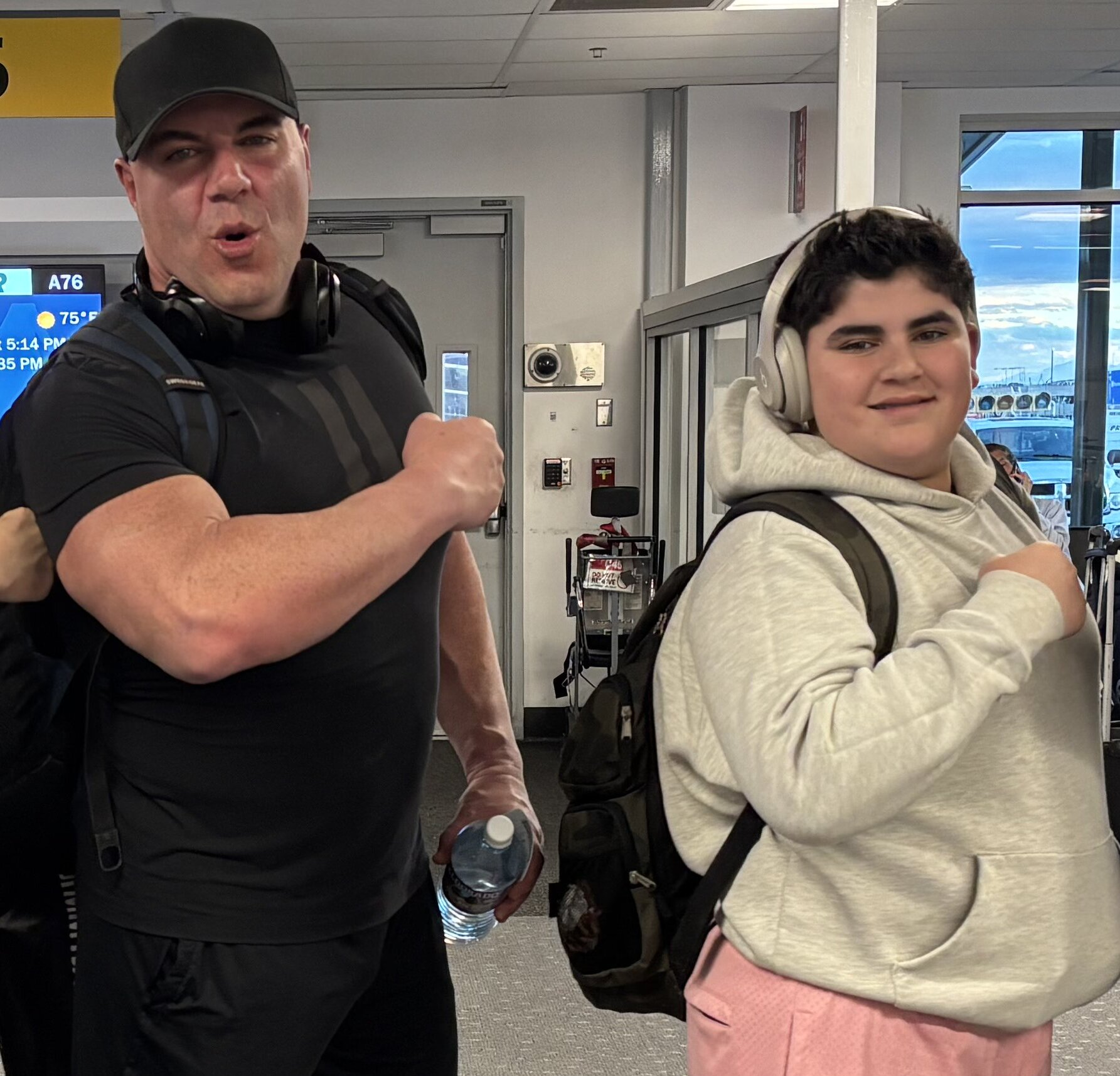
- A.J. (left) & Big Justice (right) in 2025
- Born: Andrew Befumo Jr.; January 16, 1976 (age 50); New Jersey, U.S. Eric Justice Befumo; April 8, 2013 (age 13); Colts Neck Township, New Jersey, U.S.
- Occupations: Social media personalities Professional wrestler (A.J.)
- Years active: 2014–present
- Known for: Vlogging on social media

TikTok information
- Page: A.J. & Big Justice
- Followers: 3 million

Andrew "A.J." Befumo Jr. (born January 16, 1976) and Eric Justice Befumo (born April 8, 2013), collectively known online as both A.J. & Big Justice and the Costco Guys, are American social media personalities based in Boca Raton, Florida. The father-and-son duo found popularity on TikTok and YouTube during late 2023 and early 2024 for their videos at the warehouse store Costco. Through 2024, they gained more than two million followers on TikTok, signed with the management company Night, and released their debut single "We Bring the Boom". They also make appearances for the American professional wrestling promotion All Elite Wrestling (AEW), where A.J. sporadically competes.

== Biography ==
Andrew "A.J." Befumo is of Italian descent and graduated from Red Bank Catholic High School in 1994. He worked as a professional wrestler for independent promotions around New Jersey, under the name "the American Powerchild Eric Justice", starting when he was in college and throughout the 1990s until 2005. His son, Eric, who was named after his wrestling persona, was born in 2013. He also has a daughter, Ashley. He created a family vlogging YouTube channel, All Befumo'd Up!, when Eric was three years old. He and his family eventually moved from Colts Neck Township, New Jersey, to Boca Raton, Florida.

=== TikTok ===
A.J. created a TikTok account in 2023 while working as the regional manager for a mortgage business, portraying the character of Mortgage Muscles to explain the housing market. His videos started to gain popularity after he began including his son, Eric, in them at his request. Their first video together, filmed in December 2023, showed Eric introducing A.J. eating a hamburger.

==== "Costco Guys" ====
Their first video to go viral on the platform was of them shopping for meatballs for Eric's mother, Erika, at the warehouse store Costco, which was posted in January 2024. In March of that year, they posted a video describing themselves as "Costco Guys", which, by July, had received over 47 million views. They subsequently began making videos of themselves rating products therein, either positively as a "boom" or negatively as a "doom".

=== Content creation ===
In May 2024, they signed with the talent management company Night and became full-time content creators, by which point they had also become popular on other social media platforms like Snapchat and the video-sharing service Cameo. Erika and Ashley, as well as child social media personality Christian Joseph, known online as the Rizzler, began making appearances in their videos by June 2024. Also by that month, they had more than one million followers on TikTok and were the subjects of various popular memes online. They released a hip hop single, "We Bring the Boom", in July 2024, with lyrics based on their TikTok videos. The song found success online, leading to the duo releasing several remixes, including one featuring the Rizzler. Stereogum's Tom Breihan wrote of the song that it "sounds like a version of joke-rap as recorded by someone who hasn't heard any actual rap since like 1987" and that it was "pretty fun".

Joe Tilleli of Gizmodo wrote of A.J. & Big Justice in August 2024, "If you've opened TikTok, Instagram, or X (formerly Twitter) even once this year, you probably know what a Costco Guy is." The Costco Guys have also been on many Youtube Podcasts, such as The Makeshift Project. The duo appeared alongside the Rizzler on The Tonight Show Starring Jimmy Fallon; host Jimmy Fallon was criticized for his perceived lack of enthusiasm throughout the interview. By then, they had accrued over two million followers on TikTok. The duo was also parodied in a TikTok-focused sketch on Saturday Night Live, with A.J. & Big Justice being portrayed by Marcello Hernández and Chloe Fineman, respectively.

=== All Elite Wrestling (2024–present) ===
In October 2024, A.J., a former professional wrestler prior to social media fame, announced that he had signed to wrestle fellow New Jersey native Q. T. Marshall on the pre-show of All Elite Wrestling's Full Gear pay-per-view, an event that took place at the Prudential Center in Newark, New Jersey on November 23, 2024, with Big Justice in his corner. On the November 20 episode of AEW Dynamite, Big Justice announced that The Rizzler would serve as the special guest timekeeper for the match. A.J. would go onto defeat Marshall at Full Gear. Following Full Gear, it was revealed that A.J. had sustained a broken foot while preparing for his match with Marshall. A.J. and Big Justice would next appear as compères at Christmas Collision at the Hammerstein Ballroom in New York City, where during the broadcast, Ring of Honor World Champion Chris Jericho would verbally spar with the Befumo family and Anthony Bowens.

On January 3, 2025, A.J. revealed he would return to in-ring action for AEW at their Revolution pay-per-view on March 9 at the Crypto.com Arena in Los Angeles, California. At Revolution, A.J. teamed with Conglomeration members Orange Cassidy and Mark Briscoe (with Big Justice and The Rizzler in their corner) to defeat Johnny TV and MxM Collection (Mansoor and Mason Madden). At the post-event media scrum, A.J. confirmed that he, Big Justice, and The Rizzler were signed to AEW contracts and that they would continue to make appearances, and that A.J. would continue to wrestle sporadically. At All In: Texas on July 12, 2025, A.J., accompanied by Eric and The Rizzler, competed in an eight-man tag team match, teaming with The Conglomeration (Hologram, Kyle O'Reilly, and Tomohiro Ishii) to defeat the Don Callis Family (Hechicero, Lance Archer, Rocky Romero, and Trent Beretta). A.J. and Marshall, dubbing themselves Boom & Doom faced Don Callis Family members Trent Beretta and Rocky Romero at Full Gear on November 22.

== Discography ==
=== Singles ===
Title	Date
"We Bring the BOOM!" (solo, "Crew Version", or "Family Remix")	2024
"Still Bringin' It" (solo or featuring FaZe Rug)	2024
"Jingle Boom!"	2024
"Breaking the Boom! Meter" (Note: Titled "Break the Boom! Meter" on some platforms) (with AMH and the Rizzler)	2025
"LeBron's a Boom!"	2025
"Always Gonna Boom!" (with the Rizzler and Jelly House)	2025
"Keep On Bringin' the Boom!"	2025
"Believe in the Boom!"	2025
"Big Fat Meatballs"	2025
"Big Boom! Christmas"	2025
“250 Big Booms!”	2026
