= AEW Fright Night (2026) =

All Elite Wrestling television special

Fright Night
- Promotional poster featuring Willow Nightingale, Will Ospreay, Kevin Knight, and Skye Blue
- Promotion: All Elite Wrestling
- Date: October 28, 2026 (airing October 28 and 31, 2026)
- City: St Louis, Missouri
- Venue: Chaifetz Arena
- Attendance: 3,325

Fright Night chronology
← Previous; 2025	Next → —

AEW Dynamite special episodes chronology
← Previous; Grand Slam France	Next → Blood & Guts

AEW Collision special episodes chronology
← Previous; Grand Slam France	Next → Chris Jericho's Rock N' Wrestling Rager Collision

The 2026 Fright Night was a two-part professional wrestling television special produced by All Elite Wrestling (AEW). It is the third annual Fright Night event and took place on October 28, 2026 at the Chaifetz Arena in St. Louis, Missouri, encompassing the broadcasts of Wednesday Night Dynamite and Saturday Night Collision. Dynamite aired live on October 28 on TBS in the United States, while Collision was taped that same day and aired on tape delay on October 31 on TNT, also in the United States; this was the first time that the event is held as a two-part event. Both shows were simulcast on the streaming service HBO Max.

== Production ==
=== Background ===
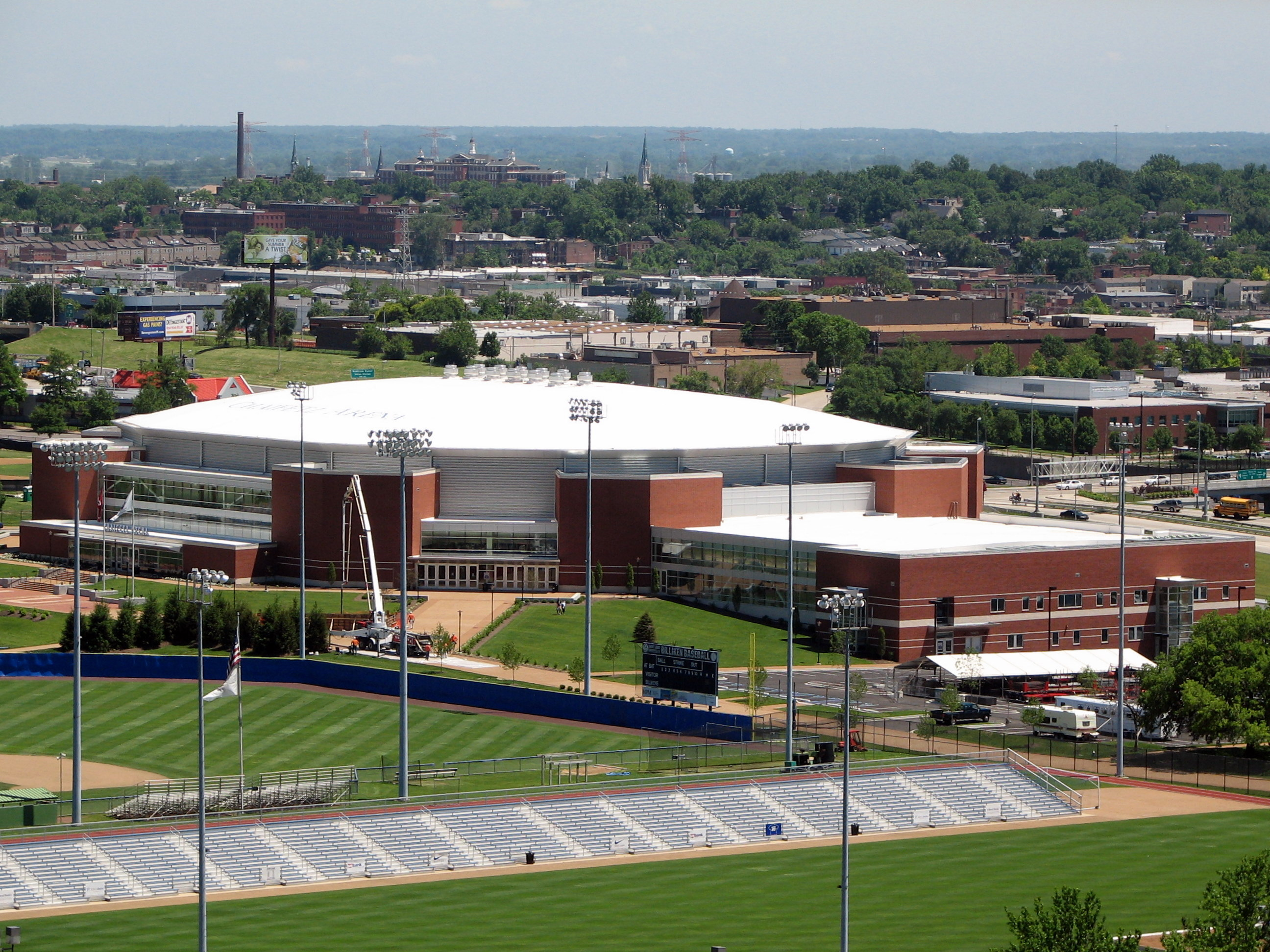
The 2026 Fright Night Dynamite was held at the Chaifetz Arena in St Louis, Missouri.

Fright Night is an annual professional wrestling television special produced by the American promotion All Elite Wrestling (AEW) since 2024. Until 2025, the event aired as a Halloween-themed special episode of the company's flagship weekly program, Wednesday Night Dynamite, however, on August 24, 2026, AEW announced that the 2026 edition of Fright Night would take place on October 28, 2026, at the Chaifetz Arena in St. Louis as a two-part event, encompassing a live edition of Dynamite airing on TBS, and a taped edition of Saturday Night Collision airing on TNT on October 28, 2026, marking the first time that the event would take place as a two-part event. Both events would also simulcast on the streaming service HBO Max in the United States.

=== Storylines ===
Fright Night featured professional wrestling matches that involved different wrestlers from pre-existing scripted feuds and storylines. Storylines were produced on AEW's weekly television programs, Dynamite and Collision.

== Results ==
Dynamite (aired live October 28)
No.	Results	Stipulations	Times
1	The Cut (Jay White and David Finlay) defeated Death Riders (Jon Moxley and Daniel Garcia) by pinfall	Tag team match	13:30
2	Kyle Fletcher (with Don Callis) defeated Jack Perry by pinfall	Singles match	16:15
3	Motor City Machine Guns (Alex Shelley and Chris Sabin) defeated FTR (Cash Wheeler and Dax Harwood) (with Stokely) by pinfall	Tag team match Match three in a best of five series.	13:00
4	Marina Shafir (with Jon Moxley) defeated Rachel Armstrong by submission	Singles match	1:35
5	Darby Allin (c) defeated Josh Alexander (with Don Callis) by pinfall	Singles match for the AEW TNT Championship	15:10
6	Queen Aminata defeated Persephone (c) (with Dr. Britt Baker, D.M.D.) by pinfall	Singles match for the AEW TBS Championship	11:30
(c) / – the champion(s) heading into the match

Collision (aired October 31)
No.	Results	Stipulations	Times
1	Tommaso Ciampa defeated Matt Sydal (with Christopher Daniels) by pinfall	Singles match	11:54
2	The Hurt Syndicate (Bobby Lashley and Shelton Benjamin) (with MVP) defeated Soloroto (Aaron Solo and Nick Comoroto) (with Griff Garrison) by pinfall	Tag team match	4:12
3	Triangle of Madness (Thekla, Julia Hart, and Skye Blue) (c) defeated Trinity (Hazuki, Koguma, and Fuwa-chan) by pinfall	Trios match for the Artist of Stardom Championship	13:04
4	Ilja Dragunov defeated The Beast Mortos by pinfall	Singles match	10:57
5	Mike Bailey defeated Darius Martin (with Christopher Daniels) by pinfall	Singles match	8:59
6	Divine Dominion (Lena Kross and Megan Bayne) defeated Nixi XS and Leela Feist by pinfall	Tag team match	2:02
7	Konosuke Takeshita defeated Adam Priest by pinfall	Singles match	8:18
8	The Cut (Austin Gunn, Colten Gunn, and Juice Robinson) defeated The Conglomeration (Orange Cassidy, Kyle O'Reilly, and Roderick Strong) by pinfall	Trios match	12:52
(c) / – the champion(s) heading into the match
