= Fright Night Dynamite =

Fright Night Dynamite may refer to:

- Fright Night Dynamite (2024), a professional wrestling event held in Cleveland, Ohio
- Fright Night Dynamite (2025), a professional wrestling event held in Edinburg, Texas
- Fright Night Dynamite (2026), a professional wrestling event held in St. Louis, Missouri
