= Fright Night Dynamite (2024) =

All Elite Wrestling television special

- Promotional poster featuring various AEW wrestlers
- Promotion: All Elite Wrestling
- Date: October 30, 2024
- City: Cleveland, Ohio
- Venue: Wolstein Center
- Attendance: 3,487

AEW Dynamite special episodes chronology
← Previous; Title Tuesday	Next → Thanksgiving Eve

Fright Night Dynamite chronology
← Previous; First	Next → 2025

Fright Night Dynamite was a professional wrestling television special produced by All Elite Wrestling (AEW). It took place on October 30, 2024, at the Wolstein Center in Cleveland, Ohio and aired live as a special Halloween episode of Wednesday Night Dynamite on TBS in the United States. The event notably featured Adam Cole's first match in over a year, having last wrestled at All Out in September 2023, the return of Mark Davis after having a wrist injury for over a year, and the AEW debut of Bobby Lashley, who had left WWE in August after the expiration of his contract.

Six matches were contested at the event, including two dark matches which took place before the televised broadcast. In the main event, Swerve Strickland defeated Shelton Benjamin. After the match, Bobby Lashley debuted and attacked Strickland, reuniting with Benjamin and MVP as The Hurt Syndicate, previously known as The Hurt Business in WWE. In other prominent matches, Kris Statlander defeated Kamille which was her first pinfall loss and first loss in AEW overall, Private Party (Isiah Kassidy and Marq Quen) defeated The Young Bucks (Matthew Jackson and Nicholas Jackson) to win the AEW World Tag Team Championship where if Private Party had lost, they would have had to disband as a team, and in the opening bout, Adam Cole defeated Buddy Matthews.

== Production ==
Other on-screen personnel
Role	Name
Commentators	Excalibur
Commentators	Tony Schiavone
Commentators	Matt Menard
Ring announcer	Justin Roberts
Referees	Aubrey Edwards
Referees	Bryce Remsburg
Referees	Paul Turner
Referees	Rick Knox
Interviewers	Renee Paquette
Interviewers	Alex Marvez

=== Background ===
AEW Dynamite is the flagship weekly television program of the American professional wrestling company All Elite Wrestling (AEW). On October 15, 2024, it was reported that AEW had filed to trademark "Fright Night Dynamite" and "AEW: Fright Night Dynamite". During the October 16 episode of Dynamite, the company announced that the October 30 episode would be a special Halloween-themed show entitled Fright Night Dynamite. The television special took place at the Wolstein Center in Cleveland, Ohio and aired live on TBS in the United States.

=== Storylines ===
Fright Night Dynamite featured professional wrestling matches that involved different wrestlers from pre-existing scripted feuds and storylines. Storylines were produced on AEW's weekly television programs, Dynamite, Rampage, and Collision.

== Results ==
No.	Results	Stipulations	Times
1^{D}	Nyla Rose defeated Ella Elizabeth	Singles match	—
2^{D}	Satnam Singh defeated Colt Cabana	Singles match	—
3	Adam Cole defeated Buddy Matthews by pinfall	Singles match	15:30
4	Private Party (Isiah Kassidy and Marq Quen) defeated The Young Bucks (Matthew Jackson and Nicholas Jackson) (c) by pinfall	Tag team match for the AEW World Tag Team Championship; Had Private Party lost, they would have had to disband.	18:10
5	Kris Statlander defeated Kamille (with Mercedes Moné) by pinfall	Singles match	6:30
6	Swerve Strickland (with Prince Nana) defeated Shelton Benjamin (with MVP) by pinfall	Singles match	15:00
(c) / – the champion(s) heading into the match; D / – this was a dark match
