= The Rizzler =

American social media personality (born 2016)

- Born: Christian Joseph Savasta; April 19, 2016 (age 10); Staten Island, New York City, U.S.
- Occupation: Social media personality
- Years active: 2023–present
- Known for: TikTok popularity

Instagram information
- Page: The Rizzler
- Followers: 1.9 million

TikTok information
- Page: ItzTheRizzler
- Followers: 1.9 million
- Last updated: October 18, 2026

Christian Joseph Savasta (born April 19, 2016), known online as The Rizzler (or simply Rizzler), is an American social media personality from New Jersey. He is best known for his "Rizz Face", an expression where he squints his eyes while stroking his chin and pursing his lips.

== Personal life ==
Joseph was born on Staten Island on April 19, 2016, and moved to New Jersey at an early age. Joseph's father is Bryan Savasta, and is usually referred to as "Uncle Savasta" in Costco Guys content.

== Career ==
Joseph first gained attention in 2023 when a video of him wearing a Black Panther Halloween costume went viral. He is known for his "Rizz Face", which involves squinting his eyes, raising one eyebrow, lowering the other, and pursing his lips. The nickname "the Rizzler" originates from a combination "rizz", a Generation Z slang term meaning "charisma", and the Riddler, a character from DC Comics. As a slang term, Green's Dictionary of Slang defines rizzler as "one who pursues the opposite sex, a flirt."

Joseph collaborates frequently with Eric Befumo, known as "Big Justice", and Eric's father, A.J. Befumo, known together as the Costco Guys, to whom Joseph is not related. On October 28, 2024, the three appeared together on The Tonight Show Starring Jimmy Fallon.

On October 2, 2024, Joseph was featured in the "Crew Version" of the song "We Bring the BOOM!" The song, directed by A.J. and Big Justice, featured several people who frequently collaborated with the two. Joseph also collaborated with comedian Eric D'Alessandro on a Christmas song named "Merry Rizzmas".

In November 2024, Joseph began appearing alongside A.J. and Big Justice for the professional wrestling promotion All Elite Wrestling (AEW). On November 23, at the wrestling event Full Gear, he served as the special guest timekeeper for A.J.'s match with Q.T. Marshall. On March 9, 2025, at the Revolution event, Joseph would be in the corner of A.J., Mark Briscoe, and Orange Cassidy during their match against Johnny TV and MxM Collection (Mansoor and Mason Madden). Joseph would make his entrance dressed up like Orange Cassidy and performing the "Rizz Face" on the ramp. After Revolution, it was confirmed that he, A.J. and Big Justice, had officially signed AEW contracts.

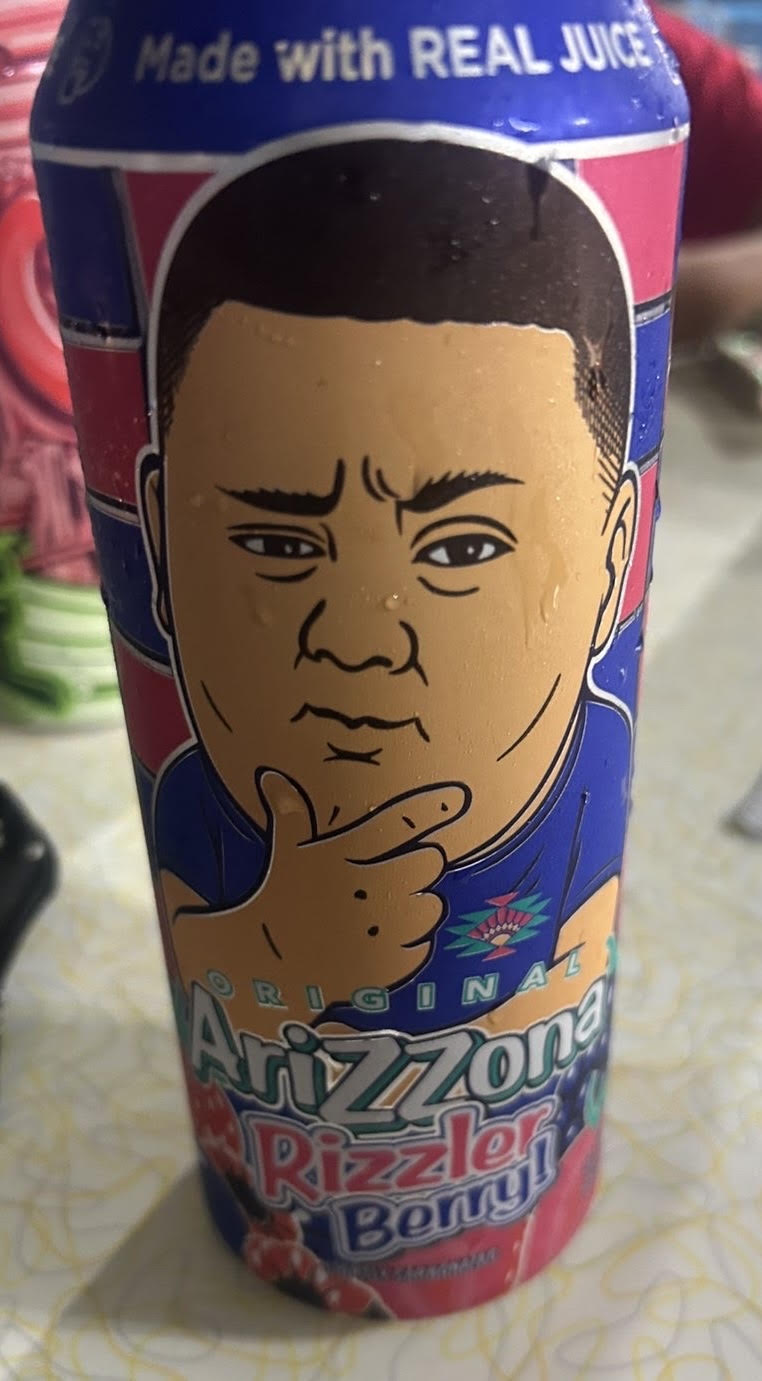
Can of "Arizzona Rizzler Berry"

On April 6, 2025, Joseph threw out the ceremonial first pitch of a New York Mets baseball game. On July 12, at the All In wrestling event, he appeared in the corner of A.J. and The Conglomeration (Kyle O'Reilly, Hologram, and Tomohiro Ishii) during their eight-man tag team match against Don Callis Family (Hechicero, Lance Archer, Rocky Romero, and Trent Beretta).

In July 2025, the fast-food restaurant chain Hardee's aired a commercial featuring Joseph and country singer Ashley Cooke. In October, Joseph served as the ring bearer in a wedding hosted by financial technology company Ramp.

In August 2025, the beverage company Arizona announced the creation of a new drink flavor "Rizzler Berry", featuring Joseph on the 23oz can. It was released later that year.

== See also ==
- A.J. & Big Justice
