= Ricochet (wrestler) =

American professional wrestler (born 1988)

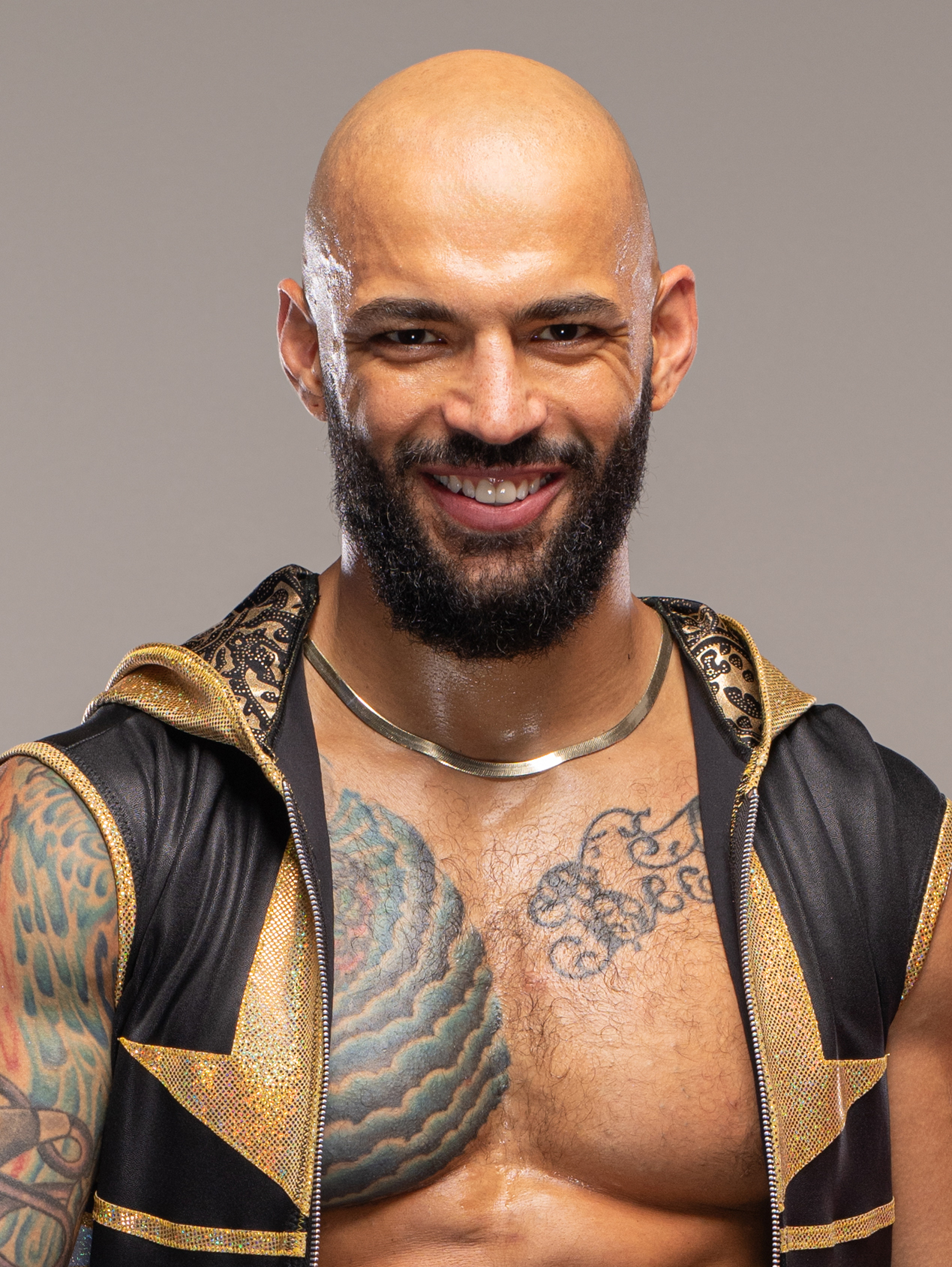
- Ricochet in 2024

Personal information
- Born: Trevor Mann; October 11, 1988 (age 38) Alton, Illinois, U.S.
- Spouse: Samantha Irvin (m. 2025)
- Children: 1

Professional wrestling career
- Ring name(s): Cameron Locke; Helios; Prince Puma; Ricochet; Trevor Mann
- Billed height: 5 ft 9 in (175 cm)
- Billed weight: 188 lb (85 kg)
- Billed from: Las Vegas, Nevada; Paducah, Kentucky; Boyle Heights, California
- Trained by: Brandon Walker; Chuck Taylor; Matt Bloom; WWE Performance Center
- Debut: October 11, 2003

Trevor Mann (born October 11, 1988), known by his ring name Ricochet, is an American professional wrestler. As of August 2024, he is signed to All Elite Wrestling (AEW), where he is the leader of The Demand stable.

Known for his high-flying wrestling style marked by innovative acrobatics, agility, and mid-air flexibility, Mann has performed for various Japanese promotions such as Dragon Gate (DG) and its American branch Dragon Gate USA (DGUSA), and New Japan Pro-Wrestling (NJPW). In DG and DGUSA, he held the Open the Brave, Dream, Triangle, Twin, and Freedom Gate Championships, and also won the 2013 King of Gate. In NJPW, he won the 2014 Best of the Super Juniors tournament, and the 2015 Super Junior Tag League tournament alongside Matt Sydal, in addition to being a former 3-time IWGP Junior Heavyweight Tag Team Champion and a former three-time NEVER Openweight 6-Man Tag Team Champion.

Mann also wrestled as Prince Puma for American promotion Lucha Underground where he was the inaugural two-time Lucha Underground Champion and a former Lucha Underground Trios Champion. He is also known for his tenure with Pro Wrestling Guerrilla (PWG) from 2010 to 2018 where he is a former PWG World Champion, and the only two-time Battle of Los Angeles (BOLA) winner, winning the 2014 and 2017 tournaments. Mann also worked for the Philadelphia, Pennsylvania-based Chikara promotion, working under a mask as Helios.

Mann signed with WWE in 2018 and defeated Fabian Aichner in his debut match for WWE's developmental brand, NXT. He later competed at NXT TakeOver: New Orleans for the NXT North American Championship, a title he would win four months later at NXT TakeOver: Brooklyn IV. In February 2019, he started appearing on the main roster, making appearances on Raw and SmackDown. These appearances led to him teaming with Aleister Black, winning the fourth annual Dusty Rhodes Tag Team Classic, and challenging for the Raw Tag Team Championship at Fastlane and the WWE SmackDown Tag Team Championship at WrestleMania 35. After officially moving to the main roster after WrestleMania 35, he won his first main roster title, the United States Championship, at Stomping Grounds. He later would go on to win the Intercontinental Championship on an episode of SmackDown in 2022. In mid-2024, he became the inaugural Speed Champion before leaving WWE at the end of June. He then signed with AEW that August, where he became a one-time AEW World Trios Champion and the inaugural AEW National Champion.

== Professional wrestling career ==
=== Early career (2003–2006) ===
Trevor Mann started out in Chaos Pro Wrestling in 2003 under the ring name Ricochet when he was only 14. He began competing on the independent circuit until he made his first major outing on February 6, 2006, at Insanity Pro Wrestling's Sacrifice event, where he took part in a five-man elimination match involving future long-time rival Chuck Taylor, DieHard, Tony Galloway, and Ty Blade. Ricochet was the final wrestler eliminated as Taylor pinned him to win the match. A few weeks later on February 18, Ricochet took part in his first major championship match as he, Chuck Taylor, Jeff Jameson, Brian Sterling, and Cabana Man Dan took part in another five-man elimination match at Independent Wrestling Association Mid-South's Xtreme Warfare event for the vacant Deep South Heavyweight Championship, which Cabana Man Dan won.

A few months later at IWA Mid-South's event We're No Joke! on April 1, Ricochet took part in a nine-man Tables, Ladders, and Chairs match to determine the one contender for the Light Heavyweight Championship, also involving his rival Chuck Taylor. Although he lost the match to Darin Corbin, he was involved in an infamous spot in which he performed his finishing move, a double rotation moonsault, off of a ladder to the outside of the ring and onto the other eight competitors. On that same day, Ricochet also competed at Insanity Pro Wrestling's event Mischief, Mayhem and Revenge, where he lost to Taylor for the promotion's Junior Heavyweight Championship.

=== Chikara (2006–2010) ===
==== Young Lions Cup champion (2006–2008) ====
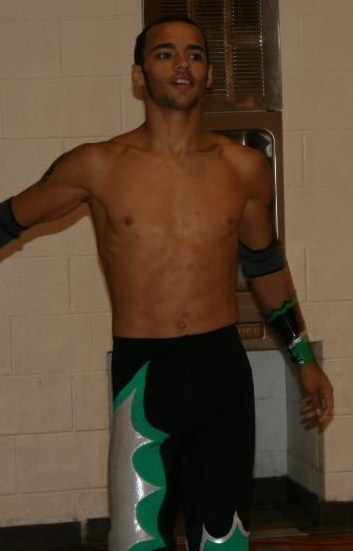
Ricochet in 2008

On June 24, Ricochet made his Chikara debut as he lost in the first round of the fourth Young Lions Cup tournament against Chuck Taylor. The following day, he teamed with Player Uno in a losing effort to Taylor and Cloudy. A few months later on November 17 at the event Brick, Ricochet picked up his first win as a member of the Chikara roster after he, Cloudy, and Mike Quackenbush defeated Cheech, Retail Dragon, and Shane Storm. The following day, Ricochet again lost to Taylor at the event Talent Borrows; Genius Steals.

On February 16, 2007, at the King of Trios event, Ricochet made his first challenge for the Young Lions Cup, yet he was unable to defeat Max Boyer for the title. Two days later, he lost to Claudio Castagnoli. On April 22, Ricochet took part in the semi-finals of the first-ever Rey de Voladores tournament, where he lost in a fatal four-way elimination match involving Retail Dragon, Pac, and long-time rival Chuck Taylor, the latter of whom would go on to win the tournament. On June 23, Ricochet won his first round match of the fifth Young Lions Cup tournament after he defeated Chrisjen Hayme. Later that day, Ricochet won a six-way elimination match in the semi-finals to advance to the final. The next day, Ricochet lost to Chuck Taylor for the vacant Young Lions Cup. On August 18 at the event Here Come The International Invaders, Ricochet faced and lost to Taylor in a Young Lions Cup vs. Career match, resulting in Ricochet being forced to leave Chikara.

On October 27 at New Star Navigation, Ricochet, sporting a new haircut, new attire and a wrestling mask, returned to Chikara under the ring name Helios where he finally defeated Taylor for the Young Lions Cup. However, Taylor disputed Helios' win by claiming that Helios was actually Ricochet in disguise. Despite Taylor's claims, Helios' win was still ruled as valid and was thus still the official new champion. On November 16 at Battle Of Who Could Care Less, Helios retained his Young Lions Cup title after defeating Hydra. The following day at The Sordid Perils Of Everyday Existence, Helios again retained his title, this time against Fire Ant.

==== The Future is Now (2008–2010) ====
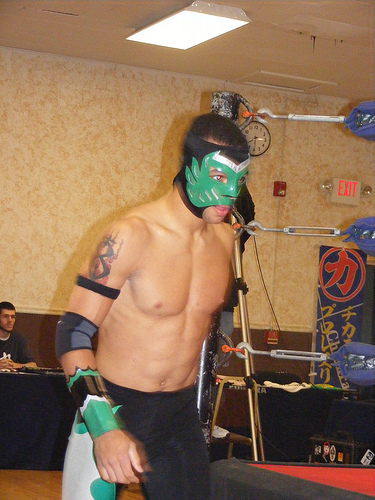
The masked Helios during a Chikara event

On February 29, 2008, Helios teamed with Incoherence (Hallowicked and Delirious) and the three became "The Golden Trio" in order to participate in the 2008 King of Trios tournament. After receiving a bye in the first round, The Golden Trio defeated Team IPW:UK (Martin Stone, Terry Frazier and Sha Samuels) and The Fabulous Three (Larry Sweeney, Mitch Ryder, and Shayne Hawke) in the second and quarterfinal rounds, respectively, before losing to The BLKOUT in the semi-finals. On April 19 at Deuces Wild, Helios successfully retained the Young Lions Cup against Lince Dorado. At Grit And Glory on May 15, Helios advanced to the final of the Rey de Voladores tournament, yet he ultimately lost to Incognito. On June 15, Helios lost his Young Lions Cup after Fire Ant defeated Vin Gerard in the final of the sixth Young Lions Cup tournament. On September 6, Helios teamed up with Tim Donst to take part in the first-ever La Lotería Letal tournament where they lost to Icarus and Ultimo Breakfast in the first round. On November 11 at Cibernetico Begins, Helios was a part of Team Equinox (Equinox, Fire Ant, Soldier Ant, Worker Ant, Hydra, Tim Donst, and Mike Quackenbush) as they defeated Team Vin Gerard (Gerard, STIGMA, Lince Dorado, UltraMantis Black, Crossbones, Amasis, Ophidian, and Eddie Kingston) in a 16-man elimination tag team match. At Face with a View on December 12, Helios formed The Future is Now with Equinox and Lince Dorado and they defeated The UnStable (Vin Gerard, Colin Delaney and STIGMA).

On January 1, 2009, The Future is Now (Helios and Dorado) lost their first match together against Team F.I.S.T. (Icarus, Gran Akuma). At the 2009 King of Trios tournament, The Future is Now defeated Team DDT (Kota Ibushi, KUDO, and Michael Nakazawa) and The Osirian Portal (Amasis, Ophidian and Escorpion Egipcio) in the first and quarterfinal rounds, respectively, before losing to Team F.I.S.T. (Icarus, Gran Akuma and Chuck Taylor) in the semi-finals. Following the tournament, The Future is Now then began a feud with The Osirian Portal, resulting in Helios defeating Escorpion Egipcio in a singles match at Behind The 8 Ball on April 25 and The Future is Now defeating The Osirian Portal at The Bobliographon event the following day.

On the first show of 2010, Lince Dorado turned on Equinox and left the Future is Now to join the new heel stable Bruderschaft des Kreuzes (BDK). In May 2010, during the Aniversario weekend, Helios and Equinox first defeated Dorado and his BDK teammate Tim Donst in a tag team match and then won a four-team elimination match to earn the three points needed in order to challenge for the Campeonatos de Parejas. Helios and Equinox received their title shot on June 27 at Faded Scars and Lines, yet they were defeated by the defending champions BDK (Ares and Claudio Castagnoli) in two straight falls after a pre–match assault. The Future is Now came to its end on September 19, 2010, when Olsen left the stable to re–form his old tag team with Colin Delaney. This event also marked Helios' final appearance for Chikara as he began working regularly for both Dragon Gate and Dragon Gate USA.

=== Evolve and Dragon Gate USA (2010–2017) ===
On January 16, 2010, Ricochet would make his debut for Evolve at the company's debut show Evolve 1: Ibushi vs Richards in a winning effort against Arik Cannon. However Ricochet would lose at the next event on March 13, 2010, at Evolve 2: Hero vs Hidaka to Chuck Taylor and again via countout on May 1, 2010, at Evolve 3: Rise Or Fall to Johnny Gargano. After being defeated by Drake Younger in a four-way match on July 23, Ricochet ended his losing streak on September 11, by defeating Kyle O'Reilly.

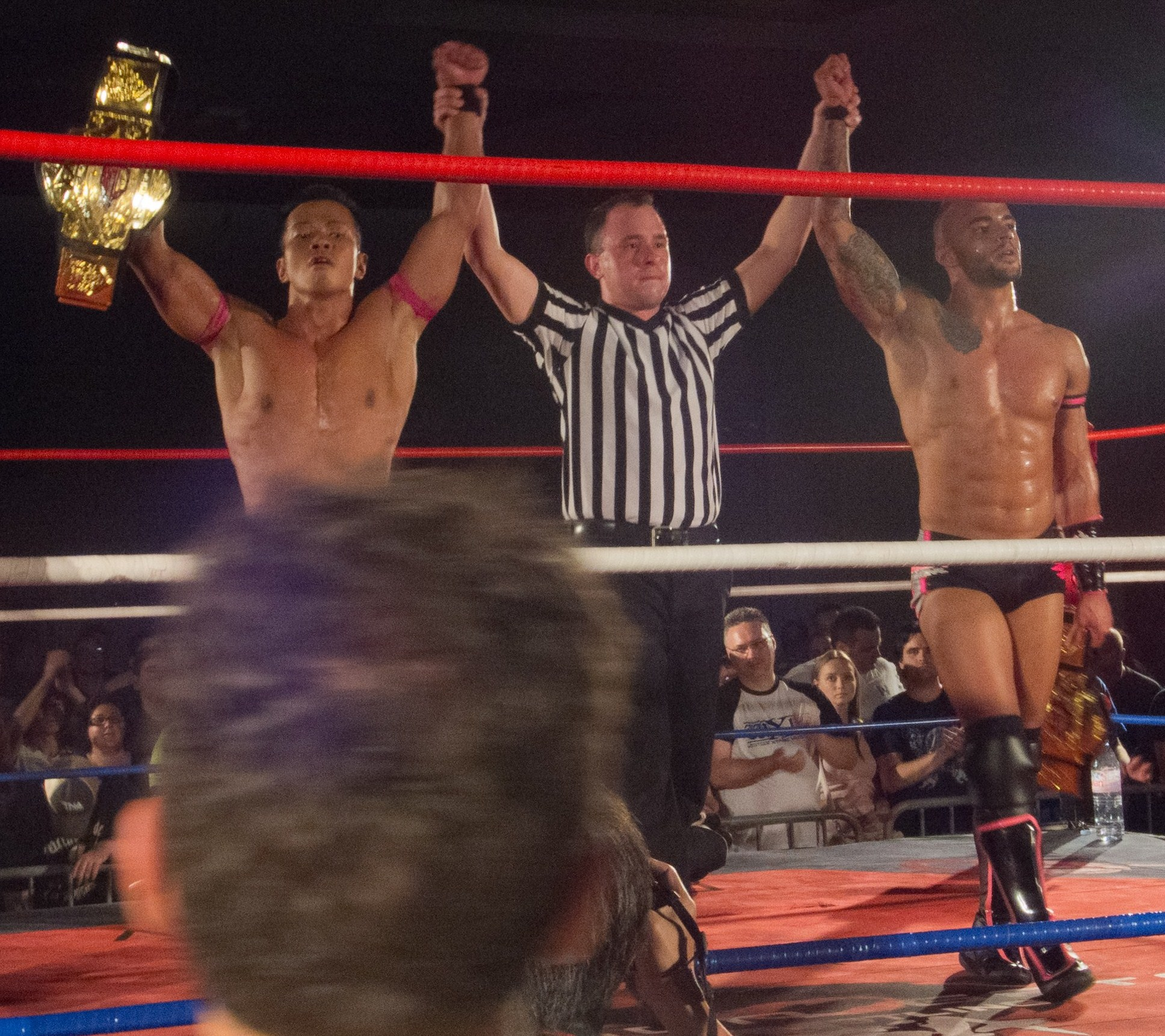
Ricochet (right) and Masato Yoshino captured the Open the United Gate Championship at the Open the Ultimate Gate event in March 2012.

On July 24, 2010, Ricochet made his debut for Dragon Gate USA at Enter the Dragon 2010, being defeated by Chuck Taylor in a four-way match, which also included Arik Cannon and Adam Cole. At the following event on September 25, Ricochet teamed with Cima to defeat Speed Muscle (Masato Yoshino and Naruki Doi) in a tag team match. After the match Cima gave Ricochet a spot in his Warriors International stable. The following day Ricochet defeated Gran Akuma in a singles match. On October 29 at Dragon Gate USA's first live pay-per-view, Bushido: Code of the Warrior, Ricochet wrestled in a four-way match, which was won by Chuck Taylor and also included Arik Cannon and Johnny Gargano. At the following day's tapings of Freedom Fight 2010, Ricochet teamed with his Warriors International stable mate Genki Horiguchi and Austin Aries in a six-man tag team match, where they were defeated by Ronin (Chuck Taylor, Johnny Gargano and Rich Swann).

When Dragon Gate USA returned on January 29, 2011, Ricochet now represented heel stable Blood Warriors and teamed with new stable mate Naruki Doi in the tournament to determine the first ever Open the United Gate Champions. In their first tournament match, Ricochet and Doi were defeated by Ronin representatives Chuck Taylor and Johnny Gargano. The following day Ricochet and Doi were defeated in the main event of the evening by the World–1 team of Masato Yoshino and Pac. On April 2 at Mercury Rising 2011, Ricochet, Cima and Naruki Doi defeated Ronin (Chuck Taylor, Johnny Gargano and Rich Swann) in the main event six-man tag team match. During the match Ricochet suffered an ankle injury, which forced him out of the following day's match for the Open the United Gate Championship.

On September 11 at Way of the Ronin 2011, Ricochet and Cima defeated Masato Yoshino and Pac to win the Open the United Gate Championship in a match, where Ricochet's and Cima's Open the Twin Gate Championship was also on the line. After the merger of Evolve and Dragon Gate USA, Ricochet took part in the final official professional wrestling match in the Asylum Arena, when he unsuccessfully challenged Johnny Gargano for the Open the Freedom Gate Championship at an Evolve event on January 14, 2012. On March 30, Ricochet and Cima were forced to vacate the Open the United Gate Championship, after Cima was sidelined with a neck injury. In the main event of the evening, Ricochet teamed with Masato Yoshino to defeat Chuck Taylor and Johnny Gargano and regain the Open the United Gate Championship. On June 21, Ricochet and Yoshino were stripped of the title due to Yoshino being unable to appear at the following month's Dragon Gate USA events. On July 29, Ricochet teamed with Rich Swann in a match to determine the new Open the United Gate Champions. They were, however, defeated in the match by Cima and AR Fox. On November 2 at Fearless 2012, Ricochet was defeated by Fox in a Respect match and, as a result, was forced to tell his opponent that he respected him. Two days later at Freedom Fight 2012, Ricochet unsuccessfully challenged Johnny Gargano for the Open the Freedom Gate Championship in a four-way elimination match, which also included Akira Tozawa and A. R. Fox. On April 4, 2014, Ricochet defeated Gargano to win the Open the Freedom Gate Championship. On November 16, 2014, during Dragon Gate USA's parent company WWNLive's tour of China, Ricochet lost the title back to Gargano.

=== Pro Wrestling Guerrilla (2010–2018) ===
==== Early years (2010–2012) ====
On September 5, 2010, Ricochet made his debut for Southern California promotion Pro Wrestling Guerrilla (PWG), losing to Claudio Castagnoli in the first round of the 2010 Battle of Los Angeles, in what was called a "star making performance". The following day, Ricochet participated in a six-man tag team match, where he, Johnny Goodtime and Rocky Romero were defeated by Fightin' Taylor Boys (Brian Cage, Chuck Taylor and Ryan Taylor), when Ricochet was pinned by his old rival, Chuck Taylor. At the following event The Curse of Guerrilla Island, Ricochet picked up a major victory over the World Tag Team Champion El Generico, which would mark his first win in PWG.

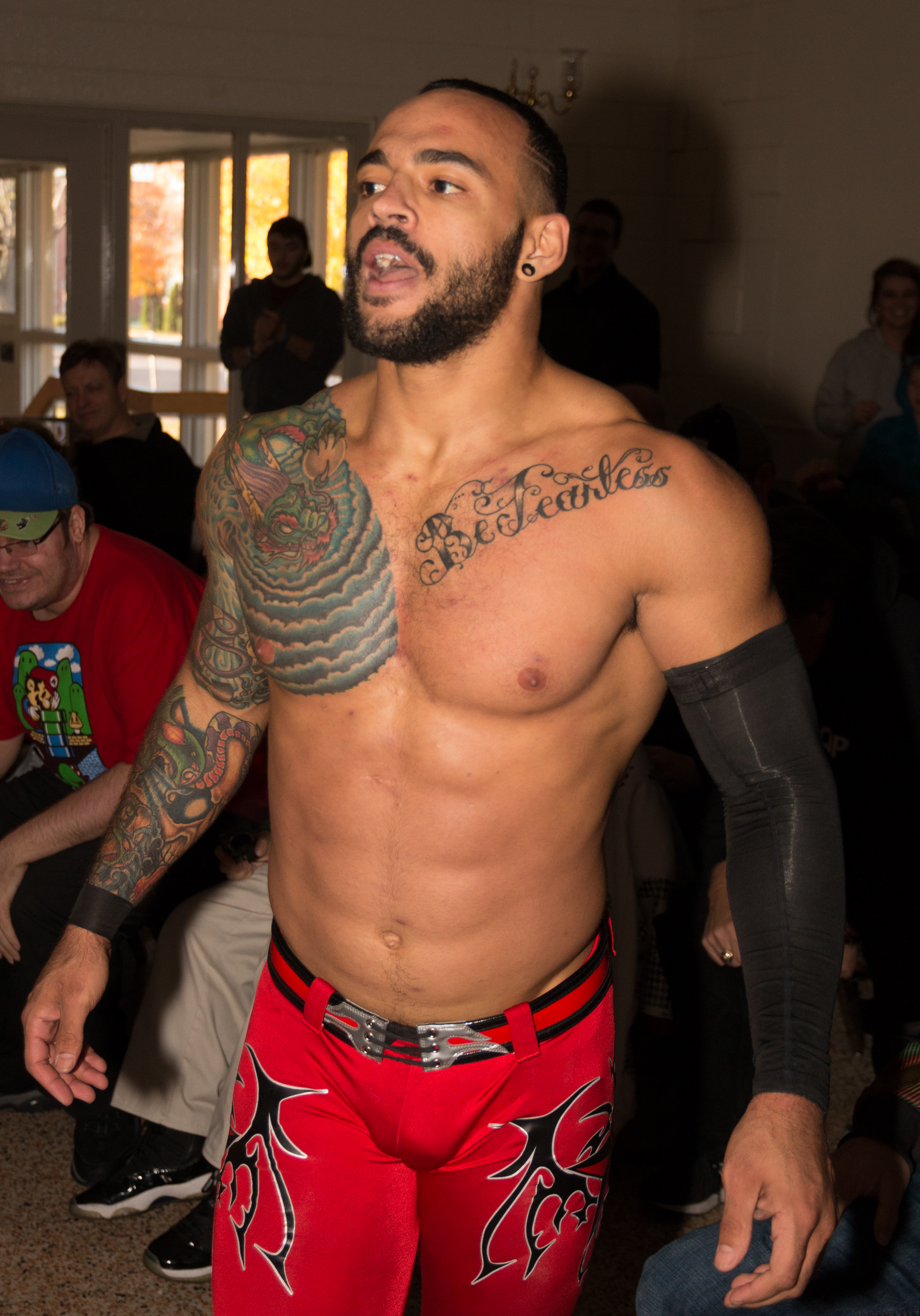
Ricochet in November 2014

At Card Subject To Change III on April 9, 2011, Ricochet filled in for Paul London, who was unable to appear at the event, and teamed with El Generico in a match to defend the World Tag Team Championship against the Dynamite Duumvirate Tag Team Title Tournament winners The Young Bucks (Matt and Nick Jackson). Ricochet and Generico lost the titles. Even though Generico blamed Ricochet for the loss, the two teamed up once again on May 27, during the first night of All Star Weekend 8, when they were defeated by the Nightmare Violence Connection (Akira Tozawa and Kevin Steen). At Eight, Ricochet teamed again with Generico in a loss to Alex Shelley and Roderick Strong.

On January 29, 2012, Ricochet resumed his Dragon Gate tag team with Cima dubbed "Spike Mohicans" in a match, where they were defeated by the RockNES Monsters (Johnny Goodtime and Johnny Yuma). At Death To All But Metal, Ricochet lost to El Generico in a grudge match main event. On September 1, Ricochet entered the 2012 Battle of Los Angeles, defeating PWG World Champion Kevin Steen in his first round match, following a distraction from his rival Brian Cage. The following day, Ricochet defeated Roderick Strong in the quarter finals, before being eliminated by Michael Elgin in the semi-finals of the tournament. As a result of his win over Steen, Ricochet unsuccessfully challenged him for the World Championship in a three-way match, which also included Elgin.

==== The Inner City Machine Guns (2013–2015) ====
On January 12, 2013, Ricochet teamed up with Rich Swann for the 2013 Dynamite Duumvirate Tag Team Title Tournament. The team, dubbed The Inner City Machine Guns, was eliminated in their first round match by The Young Bucks. On August 9 at PWG's tenth anniversary event titled Ten, the Inner City Machine Guns unsuccessfully challenged The Young Bucks for the PWG World Tag Team Championship in a three-way ladder match, which also included the DojoBros (Eddie Edwards and Roderick Strong).

On January 31, 2014, the Inner City Machine Guns made it to the final of the 2014 Dynamite Duumvirate Tag Team Title Tournament by defeating The African American Wolves (AR Fox and ACH) and Unbreakable F'N Machines (Brian Cage and Michael Elgin), before losing to the Best Friends (Chuck Taylor and Trent?). On the first night of the Battle of Los Angeles on August 29, the Guns unsuccessfully challenged World's Cutest Tag Team (Candice LeRae and Joey Ryan) for the World Tag Team Championship in a three-way match, also involving The Addiction (Christopher Daniels and Frankie Kazarian). However, Ricochet rebounded from the loss, Ricochet entered the namesake tournament by defeating Chris Sabin in the first round. On August 31, Ricochet defeated T. J. Perkins in the quarterfinals, Kenny Omega in the semifinals, and Johnny Gargano and Roderick Strong in the three-way final to win the 2014 Battle of Los Angeles. As a result, Ricochet was granted a shot at the PWG World Championship, but was defeated by the defending champion, Kyle O'Reilly, at Black Cole Sun on December 12.

On May 22, 2015, Guns participated in their third consecutive Dynamite Duumvirate Tag Team Title Tournament. They defeated Biff Busick and Drew Gulak in the quarter-final but lost to the eventual winners Andrew Everett and Trevor Lee in the semi-final. On the first night of Battle of Los Angeles, Guns lost to Los Güeros del Cielo (Angélico and Jack Evans). On August 29, Ricochet participated in the Battle of Los Angeles tournament, losing to the eventual winner Zack Sabre Jr. in the opening round. On August 30, Inner City Machine Guns teamed together for the final time in an eight-man tag team match, where they teamed with Angélico and Fénix against Mount Rushmore 2.0 (Roderick Strong, Super Dragon and The Young Bucks), which they lost.

==== PWG World Champion (2017–2018) ====
On September 3, 2017, Ricochet defeated Jeff Cobb and Keith Lee in the final to win the 2017 Battle of Los Angeles, becoming the first two-time winner of the tournament. He would also turn heel later that night after winning he tournament telling Chuck Taylor he was coming for the PWG Championship. On October 21, Ricochet defeated Chuck Taylor to win the PWG World Championship for the first time. At Mystery Vortex V, in what would be Ricochet's final appearance for the promotion, he lost the PWG World Championship back to Taylor in a Guerrilla Warfare match.

=== Dragon Gate (2010–2015, 2017) ===
Through his work in Dragon Gate USA, Ricochet got to make his first tour of Japan with its parent promotion Dragon Gate, making his debut on December 10, 2010, in Toyama, where he teamed with his Warriors stable mate Cima and Masaaki Mochizuki in a six tag team match, where they defeated Gamma, Kzy and Naruki Doi. Ricochet's first tour of Japan ended on December 26, when he, Cima and Dragon Kid defeated Naoki Tanizaki, Takuya Sugawara and Yasushi Kanda in Fukuoka at Final Gate 2010 to win the Dragon Gate Open the Triangle Gate Championship.

Ricochet turned heel on January 14, 2011, along with the rest of Warriors, attacking Masato Yoshino and World–1, and joining forces with Naruki Doi's group. On January 18 the new group was named Blood Warriors. On February 10 Cima, Naruki Doi and Gamma defeated World–1 representatives Masato Yoshino, BxB Hulk and Susumu Yokosuka in a six-man tag team match and as a result, Pac was forced to leave World–1 and join Blood Warriors. However, Ricochet blocked the move as he felt that he, not Pac, was the top high flyer in the world and instead challenged him to a match for his Open the Brave Gate Championship. The title match between Pac and Ricochet took place on March 1 and ended with Pac retaining his title. On May 15, the rest of Blood Warriors turned on Dragon Kid and kicked him out of the group, despite the fact that he still held the Open the Triangle Gate Championship with Ricochet and Cima. As a result, the title was declared vacant. On July 17, Ricochet and Cima defeated Dragon Kid and Pac of rival group Junction Three to win the Open the Twin Gate Championship. On November 19, Ricochet defeated Pac for the Open the Brave Gate Championship. After their third successful defense of the Open the Twin Gate Championship on November 30, Ricochet and Cima vacated the title in order for Ricochet to concentrate on defending the Open the Brave Gate Championship and Cima to concentrate on chasing the Open the Dream Gate Championship.

On January 19, 2012, Akira Tozawa took over the leadership of Blood Warriors, kicking Cima out of the group. After Ricochet continued to team with Cima in Dragon Gate USA, it was announced on February 9, that he was also kicked out of Blood Warriors. On March 4, Ricochet and Cima decided to mutually split up, with Ricochet joining Masato Yoshino's and Naruki Doi's new World-1 International stable and Cima reviving the Veteran-gun. On May 6, Ricochet lost the Open the Brave Gate Championship to Dragon Kid in his fourth defense. On May 25, 2013, Ricochet defeated Shingo Takagi in the final to win the 2013 King of Gate tournament. As a result, Ricochet earned a shot at the Open the Dream Gate Championship, but was defeated in the title match on June 16 by Cima. On July 21, Ricochet and Naruki Doi defeated Akira Tozawa and BxB Hulk for the Open the Twin Gate Championship. They lost the title to Dragon Kid and K-Ness on August 30. On September 12, Doi turned on Masato Yoshino, signaling the end of World-1 International. Ricochet quickly found a new alliance, forming Monster Express with Yoshino, Akira Tozawa, Shachihoko Boy, Shingo Takagi and Uhaa Nation.

On March 2, 2014, Ricochet defeated Monster Express stablemate Masato Yoshino for the Open the Dream Gate Championship, becoming the first gaijin to hold the title. Ricochet made his first successful title defense just four days later against another stablemate, Uhaa Nation. After a two-month reign, Ricochet lost the Open the Dream Gate Championship to Yamato in his second defense on May 5. Ricochet returned to Dragon Gate during the summer of 2015. On July 20, he and Matt Sydal unsuccessfully challenged Naruki Doi and Yamato for the Open the Twin Gate Championship. Ricochet returned to Dragon Gate two years later on November 3, 2017, defeating Eita. He wrestled his Dragon Gate farewell match five days later.

=== New Japan Pro-Wrestling (2013–2017) ===
On May 3, 2013, New Japan Pro-Wrestling (NJPW) announced Ricochet as a participant in the 2013 Best of the Super Juniors tournament. He made his debut for the promotion on May 22, teaming with Kenny Omega in a tag team match, where they defeated Suzuki-gun (Taichi and Taka Michinoku). In the round-robin portion of the tournament, which ran from May 24 to June 6, Ricochet managed to win five out of his eight matches with a loss against Alex Shelley on June 6, costing him a spot in the semi-finals.

Ricochet returned to take part in the 2014 Best of the Super Juniors tournament on May 30, this time advancing to the semi-finals, after finishing second in his block with a record of five wins and two losses. On June 8, Ricochet first defeated Ryusuke Taguchi in the semi-finals and then Kushida in the final to win the 2014 Best of the Super Juniors and become the number one contender to the IWGP Junior Heavyweight Championship. With his win, Ricochet became the youngest person to win the tournament and the second American to do so. On June 21 at Dominion 6.21, Ricochet unsuccessfully challenged Kota Ibushi for the IWGP Junior Heavyweight Championship.

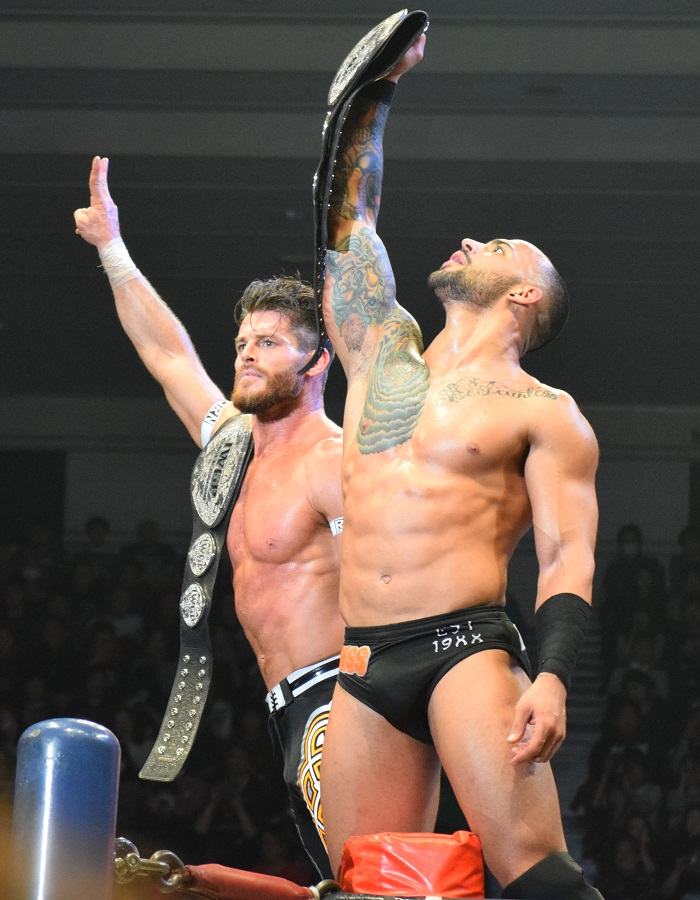
Ricochet (right) and Matt Sydal as the IWGP Junior Heavyweight Tag Team Champions in February 2016

On July 3, 2015, Ricochet made a surprise return to NJPW, challenging the winner of the IWGP Junior Heavyweight Championship match between Kenny Omega and Kushida, set to take place two days later, to a title match. Ricochet received his title match on August 16, but was defeated by Kushida. Ricochet returned to NJPW on October 24, when he and Matt Sydal entered the 2015 Super Jr. Tag Tournament, defeating Time Splitters (Alex Shelley and Kushida) in their first round match. On November 1, Ricochet and Sydal defeated The Young Bucks to advance to the final of the tournament. On November 7 at Power Struggle, Ricochet and Sydal defeated Roppongi Vice (Beretta and Rocky Romero) in the final to win the 2015 Super Jr. Tag Tournament.

On January 4, 2016, at Wrestle Kingdom 10 in Tokyo Dome, Ricochet and Sydal took part in a four-way match for the IWGP Junior Heavyweight Tag Team Championship, but were defeated by The Young Bucks. On February 11 at The New Beginning in Osaka, Ricochet and Sydal defeated The Young Bucks and reDRagon (Bobby Fish and Kyle O'Reilly) in a three-way match to become the new IWGP Junior Heavyweight Tag Team Champions. They lost the title to Roppongi Vice on April 10 at Invasion Attack 2016, before regaining the title on May 3 at Wrestling Dontaku 2016. Later in the month, Ricochet entered the 2016 Best of the Super Juniors tournament. On May 27, Ricochet faced Will Ospreay in the tournament in a match, which received widespread attention in the professional wrestling world. While some like William Regal praised the two, others criticized the match with the most notable criticism coming from Vader, who compared the match to a "gymnastics routine". Ricochet finished the tournament with a record of four wins and three losses, failing to advance to the final due to losing to Chase Owens in his final round-robin match. On June 19 at Dominion 6.19 in Osaka-jo Hall, Ricochet and Sydal lost the IWGP Junior Heavyweight Tag Team Championship to The Young Bucks in a four-way elimination match, also involving reDRagon and Roppongi Vice.

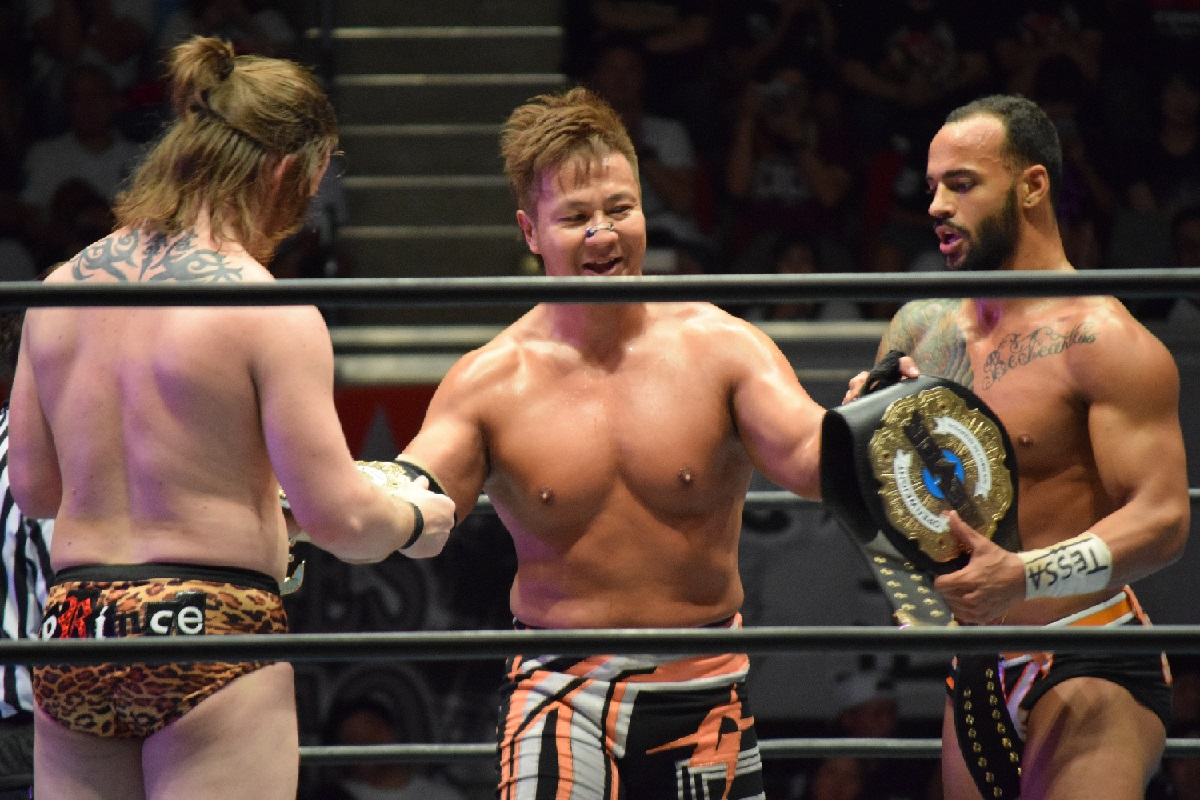
Ricochet (right), David Finlay (left) and Satoshi Kojima (center) as the NEVER Openweight 6-Man Tag Team Champions

On July 3, Ricochet and Sydal teamed up with Satoshi Kojima to defeat The Elite (Kenny Omega and The Young Bucks) for the NEVER Openweight 6-Man Tag Team Championship. They were stripped of the title on September 25 due to Sydal failing to make a scheduled title defense at Destruction in Kobe because of travel issues. That same day, Ricochet and Kojima, now teaming with David Finlay, defeated Adam Cole and The Young Bucks to regain the vacant title. This led to a match on October 10 at King of Pro-Wrestling, where Ricochet and Finlay unsuccessfully challenged The Young Bucks for the IWGP Junior Heavyweight Tag Team Championship. Ricochet, Finlay and Kojima lost the NEVER Openweight 6-Man Tag Team Championship to Los Ingobernables de Japón (Bushi, Evil and Sanada) in a four-team gauntlet match at Wrestle Kingdom 11 in Tokyo Dome on January 4, 2017. Afterwards, Ricochet joined the Taguchi Japan stable as part of which he, Ryusuke Taguchi and Hiroshi Tanahashi defeated Los Ingobernables de Japón on April 4 to win the NEVER Openweight 6-Man Tag Team Championship. On April 29, Ricochet unsuccessfully challenged Hiromu Takahashi for the IWGP Junior Heavyweight Championship. On May 3 at Wrestling Dontaku 2017, Ricochet, Tanahashi and Taguchi lost the NEVER Openweight 6-Man Tag Team Championship back to L.I.J. Ricochet then entered the 2017 Best of the Super Juniors tournament, where, despite a win over reigning IWGP Junior Heavyweight Champion Hiromu Takahashi, he failed to advance to the final with a record of four wins and three losses.

Ricochet then formed a new tag team named "Funky Future" with Ryusuke Taguchi under the banner of Taguchi Japan. On August 13, the two defeated The Young Bucks to win the IWGP Junior Heavyweight Tag Team Championship. They lost the title to Roppongi 3K (Sho and Yoh) on October 9 at King of Pro-Wrestling. Following the match, Ricochet took responsibility for the loss and thanked both NJPW and Taguchi Japan. His mannerisms were interpreted as meaning he had wrestled his final NJPW match. On November 8, Ricochet confirmed he had wrestled his final match in Japan.

=== Lucha Underground (2014–2017) ===
In September 2014, it was reported that Mann had signed with the El Rey Network's new television series, Lucha Underground. He assumed a masked character by the ring name of Prince Puma. He was given a fictional Latino background and managed by Konnan, with him doing most of the talking on his behalf. Puma wrestled in the main event of the debut episode of Lucha Underground on October 29, losing to Johnny Mundo. On the January 7, 2015, episode (taped October 5, 2014), Puma defeated 19 other wrestlers to win the Aztec Warfare battle royal and become the inaugural Lucha Underground Champion. Puma made his first televised defense of the Lucha Underground Championship on the January 14, 2015, episode of Lucha Underground against Fénix. Puma then entered a rivalry with Cage, which led to a title match between the two on the March 25 episode, where Puma retained his title. On April 19 at Ultima Lucha, Lucha Underground's season one finale, Puma lost the Lucha Underground Championship to Mil Muertes. After failing to regain the title, he formed a team with El Dragon Azteca Jr. and Rey Mysterio Jr. and entered a tournament for the Trios championship. After defeating the team which consisted of Taya and two of Puma's old adversaries Cage, and Johnny Mundo, in a qualifying match, they captured the titles last eliminating Fenix, P. J. Black, and Jack Evans in the final.

Mann had originally signed a contract with Lucha Underground, which gave him an out following the conclusion of the program's third season. With WWE reportedly looking to sign him, Lucha Underground offered Mann a new contract, which would have allowed him to continue working NJPW and the indies and would have made him "one of the highest paid non-WWE talents in the business". Mann, however, decided to opt out of his contract. On June 26, 2016, at the third season concluding Ultima Lucha Tres, Prince Puma challenged Johnny Mundo for the Lucha Underground Championship in a match, where he put his Lucha Underground career on the line. Though Puma won the match and the title, he was immediately afterwards challenged by Gift of the Gods Champion Pentagón Dark, with Dario Cueto stating that the loser of the match would be forced to retire. Pentagón won the match and the Lucha Underground Championship with help from Vampiro, ending Prince Puma's Lucha Underground career. Though Mann's Lucha Underground contract had expired, he could not appear on television for another promotion until season three had been aired in its entirety. Mann later commented on his status, stating that an "underground fighting company holding [him] back" was the reason he had not yet been signed by a "major promotion". The final episode of the third season aired on October 18, 2017, sixteen months after being taped.

=== WWE (2018–2024) ===
==== NXT North American Champion (2018–2019) ====
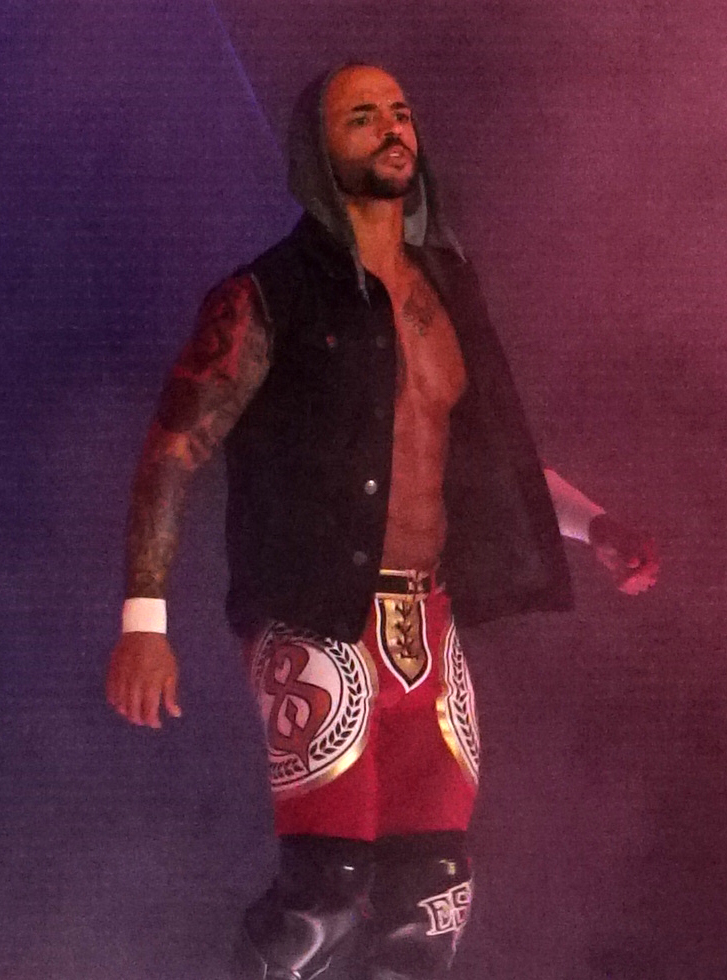
Ricochet made his WWE debut in April 2018 at NXT TakeOver: New Orleans.

On January 16, 2018, WWE announced on their website that Ricochet had signed a contract with the company and would be wrestling in WWE's developmental territory NXT. On January 27, at NXT TakeOver: Philadelphia, Ricochet, billed as his real name, was shown sitting in the audience. He made his debut in a dark match prior to a NXT taping on February 2, defeating Fabian Aichner.

Ricochet made his televised debut at NXT TakeOver: New Orleans on April 7, competing in a six-man ladder match for the inaugural NXT North American Championship, which was eventually won by Adam Cole. Ricochet began a feud with Velveteen Dream after both men argued over who was the better performer. At NXT TakeOver: Chicago II on June 16, Ricochet defeated Dream. Ricochet then began a feud with Cole and his stable The Undisputed Era (Bobby Fish, Kyle O'Reilly and Roderick Strong). At NXT TakeOver: Brooklyn IV on August 18, Ricochet defeated Cole to win the North American Championship, his first championship in WWE. On the October 10 episode of NXT, he successfully defended the title in a triple threat match against Cole and Pete Dunne. At NXT TakeOver: WarGames on November 17, Ricochet, Dunne and The War Raiders defeated The Undisputed Era in a WarGames match. On January 26, 2019, at NXT TakeOver: Phoenix, Ricochet lost the North American Championship to Johnny Gargano, ending his reign at 161 days.

In March, Ricochet formed a tag team with Aleister Black, and the two competed in the 2019 Dusty Rhodes Tag Team Classic, which they won after defeating The Forgotten Sons (Steve Cutler and Wesley Blake) in the finals. At NXT TakeOver: New York on April 5, Ricochet and Black unsuccessfully faced The War Raiders for the NXT Tag Team Championship in what was Ricochet's final match in NXT.

==== United States Champion (2019–2021) ====
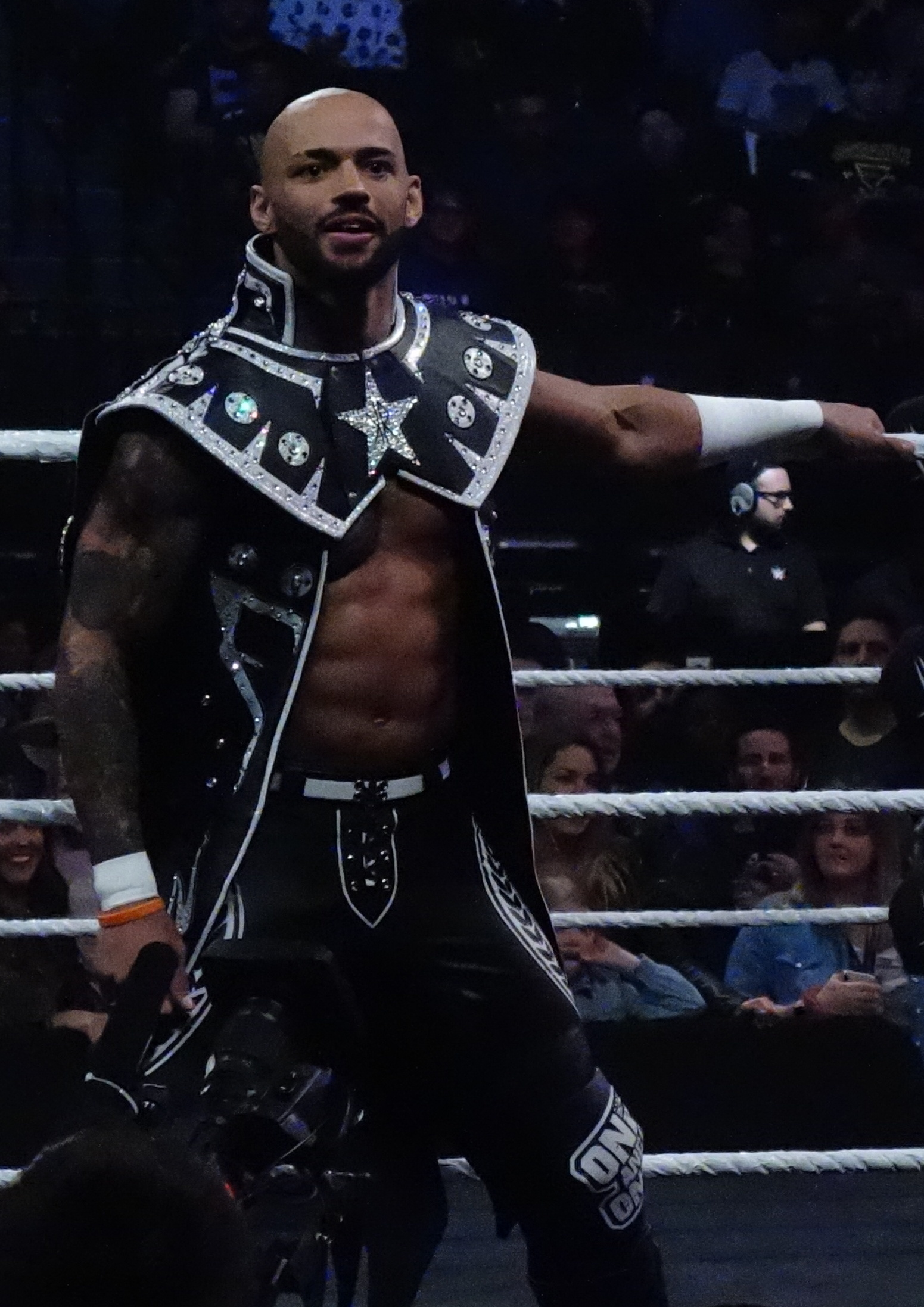
Ricochet in April 2019

On the February 18, 2019 episode of Raw, Ricochet made his main roster debut, teaming with Intercontinental Champion Finn Bálor to defeat Bobby Lashley and Lio Rush. Ricochet also continued his team with Black, and the duo competed in a Raw Tag Team Championship match at Fastlane on March 10 that featured The Revival, and Bobby Roode and Chad Gable, but failed to win. Ricochet and Black also competed for the SmackDown Tag Team Championship in a fatal four-way match at WrestleMania 35 on April 7, but were again unsuccessful.

On April 15, Ricochet was drafted to Raw as part of the Superstar Shake-up, separating him from Black, who was drafted to SmackDown. On the April 22 episode of Raw, Ricochet lost to Robert Roode, suffering his first pinfall loss on the main roster. At Money in the Bank on May 19, Ricochet competed in the titular ladder match, which was won by Brock Lesnar. On the June 17 episode of Raw, Ricochet won a fatal five-way elimination match to become the number one contender for the United States Championship. At Stomping Grounds on June 23, Ricochet defeated Samoa Joe to win the United States Championship, his first singles title on the main roster. On the July 1 episode of Raw, he successfully defended the title against AJ Styles, but was attacked by him and The O.C. (Luke Gallows and Karl Anderson) after the match. At Extreme Rules on July 14, Ricochet lost the title to Styles, ending his reign at 21 days. He failed to regain the title at SummerSlam on August 11.

Ricochet then competed in the King of the Ring tournament, defeating Drew McIntyre in the first round, but was eliminated by Baron Corbin in the semi-finals. At Crown Jewel on October 31, Ricochet made up part of Hulk Hogan's team alongside Roman Reigns, Ali, Rusev, and Shorty G in a winning effort over Ric Flair's team (Randy Orton, Bobby Lashley, McIntyre, Corbin, and Shinsuke Nakamura). At Survivor Series on November 24, Ricochet was included as part of Team Raw, where they lost to Team SmackDown in a 5-on-5-on-5 Survivor Series match, also involving Team NXT. At Royal Rumble on January 26, 2020, Ricochet participated in his first Royal Rumble match at number 15, causing Brock Lesnar to be eliminated after delivering a low blow to him, but was eliminated by eventual winner Drew McIntyre afterwards. On the February 3 episode of Raw, Ricochet defeated Lashley and Seth Rollins in a triple threat match to earn a WWE Championship opportunity against Lesnar at Super ShowDown on February 27, where he was quickly defeated by Lesnar in under two minutes.

Ricochet formed a tag team with Cedric Alexander, feuding with The Hurt Business (MVP, Lashley, and Shelton Benjamin) after they injured Apollo Crews. However, on the September 7 episode of Raw, Alexander turned on Ricochet and Crews during a six-man tag team match against The Hurt Business, attacking them and joining The Hurt Business. At Royal Rumble on January 31, 2021, Ricochet entered at number 12, but was eliminated by Kane. On February 21, at Elimination Chamber, Ricochet lost a fatal four-way match to determine who would fill in the vacant spot at the event for the United States Championship later that night. On the June 21 episode of Raw, Ricochet defeated Styles to qualify for the Money in the Bank ladder match at Money in the Bank on July 18, which was won by Big E.

==== Intercontinental Champion (2021–2022) ====
As part of the 2021 Draft, Ricochet was drafted to the SmackDown brand. In October, Ricochet entered the King of the Ring tournament, where he lost to Xavier Woods in the first round. On the December 24 (taped December 17) episode of SmackDown, Ricochet competed in a gauntlet match to determine the number one contender to the Intercontinental Championship, where he was the last person eliminated by Sami Zayn. At the Day 1 pre-show on January 1, 2022, Ricochet and Cesaro lost to Sheamus and Ridge Holland. On January 29, at Royal Rumble, Ricochet entered at number 12, where he and other competitors eliminated Omos before he was eliminated by Happy Corbin.

On the March 4 episode of SmackDown, Ricochet defeated Zayn with help from Johnny Knoxville to win the Intercontinental Championship. He retained the title against Zayn in a rematch the following week. On the April 1 episode of SmackDown, he retained the title against Angel and Humberto in a triple threat match. Over the following weeks, Ricochet made successful defenses against Jinder Mahal and Shanky before losing the title to Gunther on the June 10 episode of SmackDown, ending his reign at 98 days. He failed to regain the title on the June 24 episode of SmackDown. On August 30, Ricochet returned to NXT and challenged Carmelo Hayes for the NXT North American Championship at Worlds Collide on September 4, but he was defeated by Hayes. Ricochet then participated in the SmackDown World Cup tournament, defeating Santos Escobar in the finals on the December 2 episode of SmackDown, becoming the number one contender for the Intercontinental Championship. On the December 16 episode of SmackDown, Ricochet failed to win the title from Gunther.

==== Final storylines (2023–2024) ====
At Royal Rumble on January 28, 2023, Ricochet entered at number 28, but was eliminated by Austin Theory. During the match, Ricochet and Logan Paul performed simultaneous springboard clotheslines at each other from opposite sides of the ring and collided in midair. He soon formed a tag team with Braun Strowman, winning a tournament to challenge Undisputed WWE Tag Team Champions The Usos. On the February 10 episode of SmackDown, they failed to win the titles from The Usos. On Night 1 of WrestleMania 39 on April 1, Ricochet and Strowman participated in the men's WrestleMania Showcase fatal four-way tag team match, but lost. As part of the 2023 WWE Draft, Ricochet and Strowman were drafted to the Raw brand, however, Strowman would undergo neck surgery that took him out of action until late-April 2024.

On the May 29 episode of Raw, Ricochet defeated The Miz to qualify for the Money in the Bank ladder match at Money in the Bank on July 1, which was won by Damian Priest. In the coming weeks on Raw, Ricochet and Paul developed a feud which culminated in a match at SummerSlam on August 5, where Paul defeated Ricochet by way of using brass knuckles he was given behind the referee's back. On April 26, 2024, Ricochet won a tournament to become the inaugural Speed Champion, which aired on tape delay on May 3, the date WWE officially began his reign. He held the title until the June 7 taping of Speed, which aired on June 14, where he lost it to Andrade, ending his reign at 42 days.

On June 8, it was reported that Ricochet notified WWE he would be leaving the company when his contract expired later that summer. He was written off television on the June 10 episode of Raw, when he was attacked by Bron Breakker, leaving the company on June 30.

=== All Elite Wrestling (2024–present) ===
==== Championship pursuits (2024–2025) ====
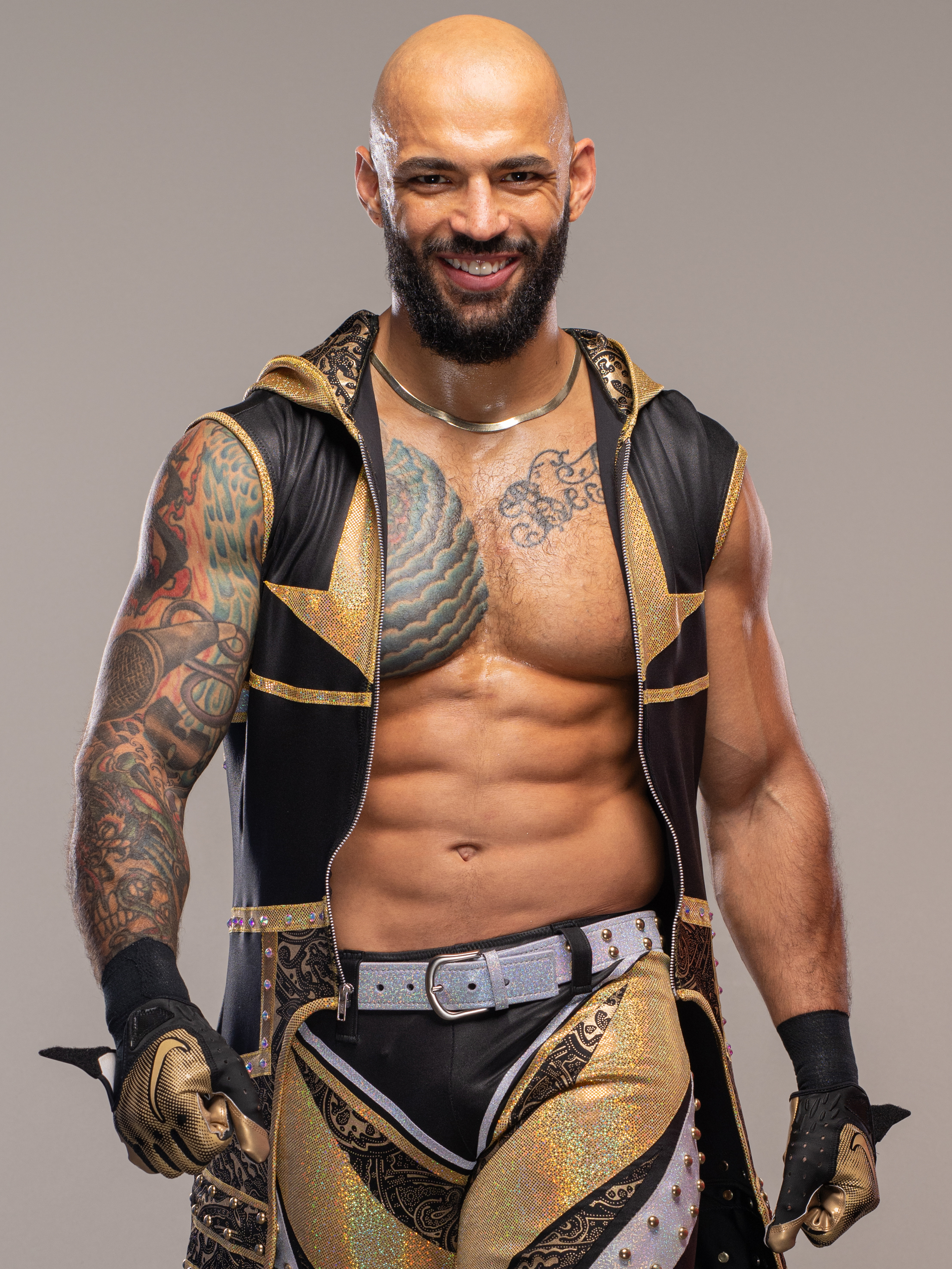
Ricochet made his All Elite Wrestling (AEW) debut in August 2024 at All In.

On August 22, 2024, it was reported by Fightful Select that Ricochet had signed a multi-year deal with All Elite Wrestling (AEW), making his debut three days later at All In as a surprise entrant in the Casino Gauntlet match, but was unsuccessful in winning the match. His first feud in AEW was with Konosuke Takeshita, after Takeshita attacked him and AEW International Champion Will Ospreay during their match for the title on the fifth anniversary episode of AEW Dynamite on October 2. On October 12 at WrestleDream, Ricochet was unsuccessful in capturing the International Championship in a three-way match, which was won by Takeshita. On November 23 at Full Gear, Ricochet unsuccessfully challenged Takeshita for his title. The next day, Ricochet was announced as a participant in the 2024 Continental Classic, where he was placed in the Gold league. During the tournament, Ricochet began developing a more cocky attitude and began cheating to win matches, teasing a potential heel turn. Ricochet finished the tournament at the top of his league with 10 points and advanced to the playoff stage on December 28 at Worlds End, where he lost to Kazuchika Okada in the semi-finals. After losing to Okada, Swerve Strickland–whom Ricochet had been taunting in the weeks leading up to Worlds End, made an appearance. Along with manager Prince Nana, Strickland handed out toilet paper to the audience and led them in throwing it onto Ricochet as he stood in the middle of the ring, fulfilling his promise of "embarrassing" Ricochet in response to his disrespect.

On January 1, 2025, at Fight for the Fallen, Ricochet viciously attacked and bloodied Strickland with a pair of scissors, cementing his heel turn. On the February 5 episode of Dynamite, Ricochet defeated Strickland and proceeded to steal the Embassy robe bestowed upon Strickland by Prince Nana in honor of charter Embassy member Jimmy Rave. On March 9 at Revolution, Ricochet was defeated by Strickland, losing the robe and a shot at the AEW World Championship. On the March 15 episode of Collision, Ricochet defeated Katsuyori Shibata in the semi-final of the International Championship eliminator tournament, advancing to the four-way grand final. On the March 19 episode of Dynamite, both Ricochet and "Speedball" Mike Bailey pinned Mark Davis to win the match, meaning that both wrestlers would challenge Kenny Omega for the International Championship on April 6 at Dynasty in a three-way match. At the event, Omega retained the title against both Ricochet and Bailey. On May 25 at Double or Nothing, Ricochet defeated Mark Briscoe in a Stretcher match.

==== The Demand (2025–present) ====
In the summer, Ricochet would form an alliance with GOA (Bishop Kaun and Toa Liona). On August 24 at Forbidden Door, GOA and Ricochet defeated JetSpeed and Michael Oku. Later in the show GOA and Ricochet attacked The Hurt Syndicate (Bobby Lashley and Shelton Benjamin) during their AEW World Tag Team Championship defense, causing them to lose their titles. Later that month, GOA and Ricochet unsuccessfully challenged The Opps for the AEW World Trios Championship after Benjamin and Lashley's stablemate MVP interfered. At All Out on September 20, Ricochet and GOA (now known as The Demand) defeated The Hurt Syndicate, but were defeated in a rematch at Dynamite: Title Tuesday on October 7 in a Street Fight and on October 12 at WrestleDream in a tornado trios match. On November 22 at Full Gear, Ricochet won a Casino Gauntlet Match to become the inaugural AEW National Champion, marking his first championship in AEW. On December 5 at the Ring of Honor (ROH) event Final Battle, Ricochet successfully defended his title against Dalton Castle. Ricochet would also successfully defend his title in partner promotions Consejo Mundial de Lucha Libre against Titán, New Japan Pro-Wrestling against Taiji Ishimori, and against various opponents on the independent circuit.

On March 15, 2026, at Revolution, Ricochet lost his title to "Jungle" Jack Perry in a 21-man Blackjack battle royal, ending his inaugural reign at 113 days. On April 12 at Dynasty, Ricochet defeated the returning Jericho with Jericho's trademark move the Lionsault, later renaming it to the Ricosault. At Double or Nothing on May 24, Ricochet's team were defeated by Jericho's team in a Stadium Stampede match. On the following episode of Dynamite, Ricochet was defeated by Jericho in a Dynasty rematch with the stipulation of everyone being banned from ringside, ending their feud. On the July 29 episode of Dynamite, The Demand defeated The Conglomeration (Orange Cassidy, Roderick Strong, and Kyle O'Reilly) to win the AEW World Trios Championship. Their reign would only last a week as they would lose the titles to Adam Page and Brodido (Brody King and Bandido) on August 5 at Grand Slam Mexico. On the October 14 episode of Collision, Ricochet defeated Ace Austin to qualify for the Clockwork Carnage match for the AEW World Championship at WrestleDream but failed to win the title at the event three days later.

=== Return to NJPW (2024–present) ===
Ricochet made his return to NJPW at Power Struggle on November 4, where he attacked IWGP World Heavyweight Champion Zack Sabre Jr. and challenged him to a match at Wrestle Dynasty on January 5, 2025. At Wrestle Dynasty, Ricochet failed to capture the title from Sabre Jr. On February 27, 2026, at The New Beginning USA, Ricochet successfully defended his AEW National Championship against Taiji Ishimori.

=== Consejo Mundial de Lucha Libre (2025–present) ===
On June 26, 2025, Ricochet made his Consejo Mundial de Lucha Libre (CMLL) debut at Fantasica Mania Mexico, defeating Volador Jr. On January 16, 2026, at Fin de Semana Internacional, Ricochet successfully defended his AEW National Championship against Titán.

== Other media ==
Mann, as Ricochet, made his video game debut as part of WWE 2K19's "Rising Stars" downloadable content pack. He also appeared as a playable character in WWE 2K20, WWE 2K Battlegrounds, WWE 2K22, WWE 2K23, and WWE 2K24.

== Personal life ==
Mann has a son from a previous relationship.

As of 2021, Mann has been in a relationship with Samantha Irvin. The couple became engaged on January 10, 2023, and married on March 26, 2025.

Mann is a supporter of the NFL’s Philadelphia Eagles. His favorite player growing up was Donovan McNabb.

== Championships and accomplishments ==
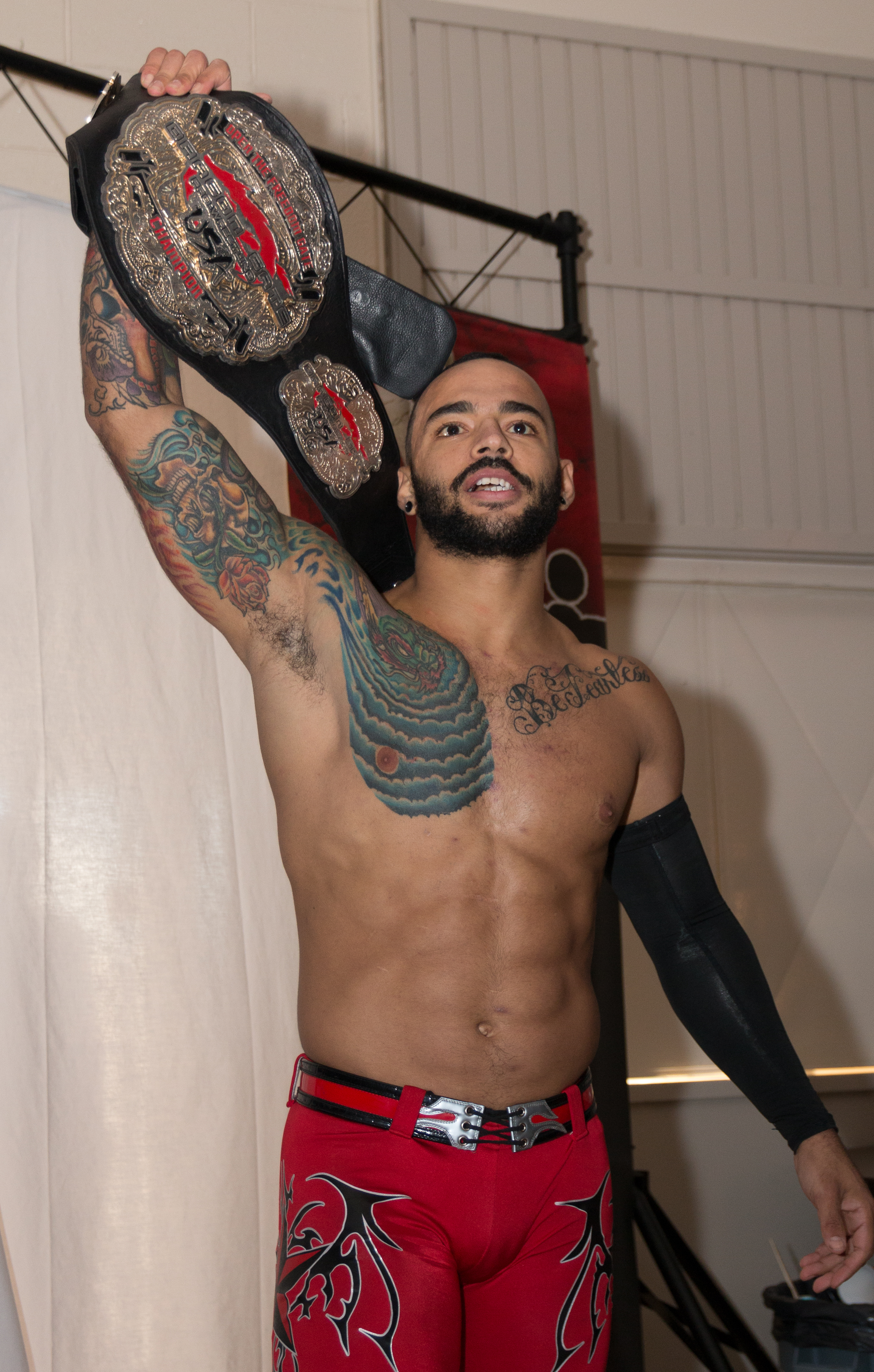
Ricochet is a former Open the Freedom Gate Champion.

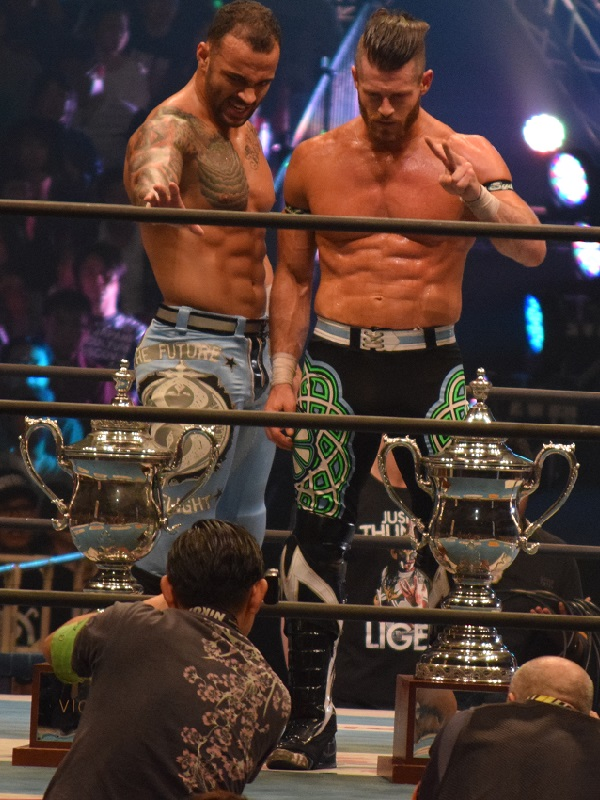
Ricochet (left) and Matt Sydal with the Super Jr. Tag Tournament trophies

- All Elite Wrestling
  - AEW National Championship (1 time, inaugural)
  - AEW World Trios Championship (1 time) – with Bishop Kaun and Toa Liona
- Chaos Pro Wrestling
  - CPW Heavyweight Championship (1 time)
- Chikara
  - Young Lions Cup V (1 time)
- Coliseum Championship Wrestling
  - CCW Lightweight Championship (2 times)
  - CCW Tag Team Championship (1 time) – with Mystic Juvenile
- DDT Pro-Wrestling
  - Ironman Heavymetalweight Championship (1 time)
- Dragon Gate
  - Open the Brave Gate Championship (1 time)
  - Open the Dream Gate Championship (1 time)
  - Open the Triangle Gate Championship (1 time) – with Cima and Dragon Kid
  - Open the Twin Gate Championship (2 times) – with Cima (1) and Naruki Doi (1)
  - King of Gate (2013)
- Dragon Gate USA
  - Open the Freedom Gate Championship (1 time)
  - Open the United Gate Championship (2 times) – with Cima (1) and Masato Yoshino (1)
- House of Glory
  - House of Glory Heavyweight Championship (1 time, inaugural)
  - HOG World Heavyweight Championship Tournament (2014)
- Independent Wrestling Association Mid-South
  - Battle of The Future Stars 2 Tournament (2009)
- Insanity Pro Wrestling
  - IPW Junior Heavyweight Championship (1 time)
  - IPW Super Junior Heavyweight Tournament (2010)
- Lucha Underground
  - Lucha Underground Championship (2 times)
  - Lucha Underground Trios Championship (1 time) – with Dragon Azteca Jr. and Rey Mysterio
  - Aztec Warfare I
  - The Cueto Cup (2016)
- New Japan Pro-Wrestling
  - IWGP Junior Heavyweight Tag Team Championship (3 times) – with Matt Sydal (2), and Ryusuke Taguchi (1)
  - NEVER Openweight 6-Man Tag Team Championship (3 times) – with Matt Sydal and Satoshi Kojima (1), David Finlay and Satoshi Kojima (1), and Hiroshi Tanahashi and Ryusuke Taguchi (1)
  - Best of the Super Juniors (2014)
  - Super Jr. Tag Tournament (2015) – with Matt Sydal
- Pro Wrestling Guerrilla
  - PWG World Championship (1 time)
  - Battle of Los Angeles (2014, 2017)
- Pro Wrestling Illustrated
  - Ranked No. 15 of the top 500 singles wrestlers in the PWI 500 in 2016
- Revolution Pro Wrestling
  - British Tag Team Championship (1 time) – with Rich Swann
- SoCal Uncensored
  - Match of the Year (2013) with Rich Swann vs. DojoBros (Eddie Edwards and Roderick Strong) and The Young Bucks (Matt Jackson and Nick Jackson) on August 9
  - Match of the Year (2016) with Matt Sydal and Will Ospreay vs. Adam Cole and The Young Bucks (Matt Jackson and Nick Jackson) on September 3
  - Wrestler of the Year (2014)
- World Series Wrestling
  - WSW Heavyweight Championship (1 time)
- Wrestling Observer Newsletter
  - Best Flying Wrestler (2011, 2014, 2015)
  - Best Wrestling Maneuver (2010, 2011) Double rotation moonsault
  - Best Flying Wrestler of the Decade (2010s)
  - Most Underrated (2020, 2021)
- WWE
  - WWE Intercontinental Championship (1 time)
  - WWE United States Championship (1 time)
  - NXT North American Championship (1 time)
  - WWE Speed Championship (1 time, inaugural)
  - SmackDown World Cup (2022)
  - WWE SmackDown Tag Team Championship No. 1 Contender Tournament (2023) – with Braun Strowman
  - Dusty Rhodes Tag Team Classic (2019) – with Aleister Black
  - NXT Year-End Award for Breakout Star of the Year (2018)
  - Bumpy Award (1 time)
    - GIF Moment of the Half-Year (2021) – Ricochet jumping over John Morrison
