= AEW Revolution (2025) =

All Elite Wrestling pay-per-view event

Revolution
- Promotional poster featuring various AEW wrestlers.
- Promotion: All Elite Wrestling
- Date: March 9, 2025
- City: Los Angeles, California
- Venue: Crypto.com Arena
- Attendance: 11,670
- Buy rate: 137,500

Pay-per-view chronology
← Previous; Wrestle Dynasty	Next → Dynasty

Revolution chronology
← Previous; 2024	Next → 2026

The 2025 Revolution was a professional wrestling pay-per-view (PPV) event produced by All Elite Wrestling (AEW). It was the sixth annual Revolution and took place on March 9, 2025, at Crypto.com Arena in Los Angeles, California. This was the first AEW PPV event to stream on Amazon Prime Video.

Twelve matches were contested at the event, including three on the "Zero Hour" pre-show. The main event saw Jon Moxley defeat Cope and Christian Cage by technical submission in a three-way match to retain the AEW World Championship; this originally started as a singles match between Moxley and Cope but Cage cashed in his Casino Gauntlet championship match contract during the match to make it a three-way. In another prominent match, "Timeless" Toni Storm defeated Mariah May in a "Hollywood Ending" match to retain the AEW Women's World Championship to conclude their storyline that had begun in November 2023; this would also be May's final appearance for the promotion before her departure in May 2025. In other prominent matches, Swerve Strickland defeated Ricochet to become the #1 contender for the AEW World Championship, Kenny Omega defeated Konosuke Takeshita to win the AEW International Championship, becoming the first-ever AEW Grand Slam Champion, and in the opening bout, "Hangman" Adam Page defeated MJF.

== Production ==
=== Background ===
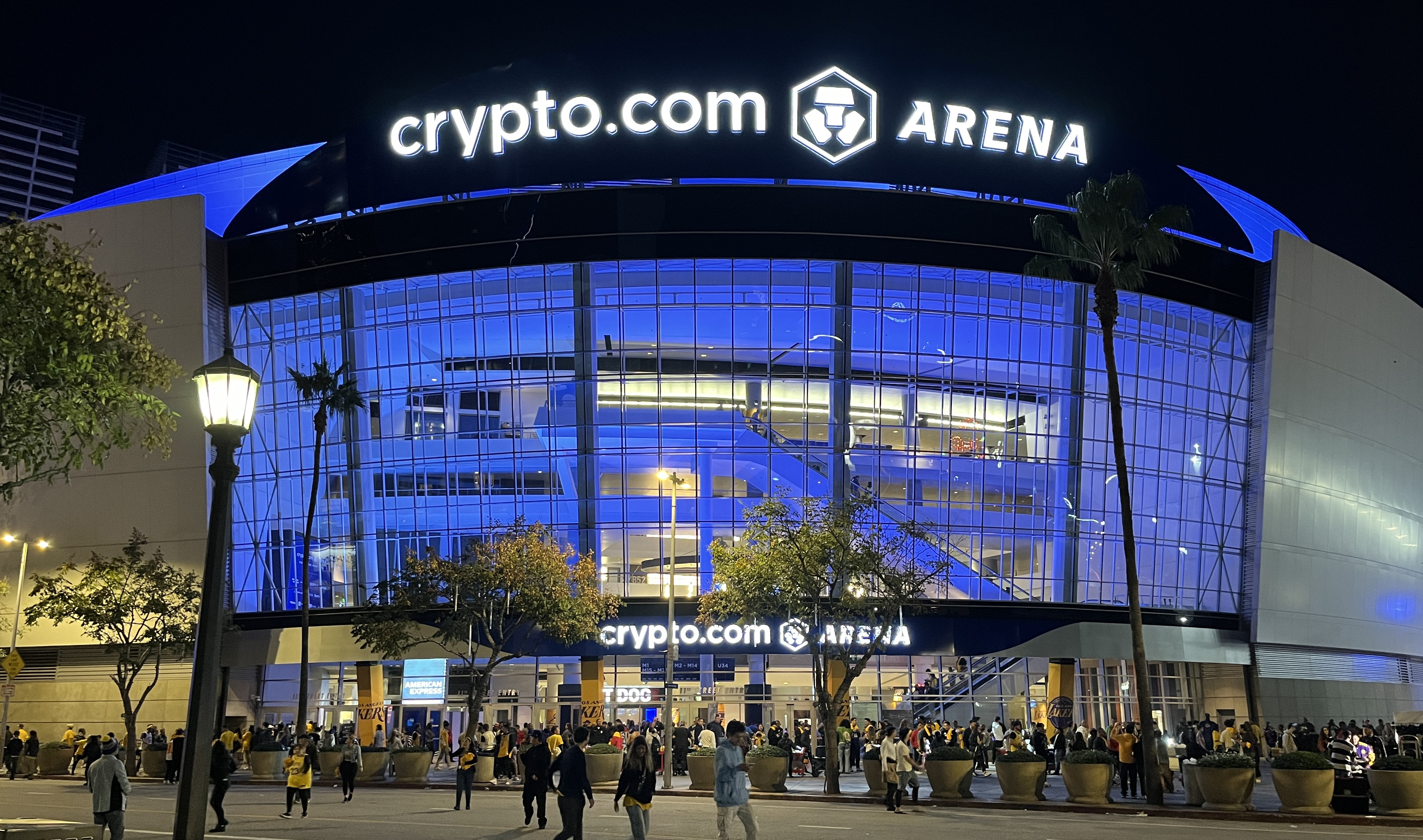
The event was held at Crypto.com Arena in Los Angeles, California, marking All Elite Wrestling's first event held at the venue.

Revolution is a professional wrestling pay-per-view (PPV) event held annually by All Elite Wrestling (AEW) since 2020—it was originally held in late February but moved to early March in 2021. It is one of AEW's "Big Five" PPVs, which also includes Double or Nothing, All In, All Out, and Full Gear, their five biggest shows produced throughout the year.

On November 19, 2024, AEW announced that the sixth Revolution would take place at Crypto.com Arena in Los Angeles, California on March 9, 2025. This marked the first time AEW held an event at the venue, as all of their prior events in the Los Angeles area were held at the Kia Forum in nearby Inglewood. On March 5, 2025, AEW announced a new PPV distribution deal with Amazon Prime Video wherein AEW's PPVs would be available to purchase on the platform in the United States, Canada, and the United Kingdom, beginning with the 2025 Revolution.

=== Storylines ===
Other on-screen personnel
Role	Name
Commentators	Excalibur (Pre-show and PPV)
Commentators	Tony Schiavone (Pre-show and PPV)
Commentators	Taz (Pre-show and PPV)
Commentators	Nigel McGuinness (PPV)
Commentators	Jim Ross (Cope vs. Moxley/Storm vs. May)
Commentators	Don Callis (International title and Steel cage matches)
Commentators	Matt Menard (Pre-show)
Spanish Commentators	Carlos Cabrera
Spanish Commentators	Alvaro Riojas
Spanish Commentators	Ariel Levy
Ring announcer	Justin Roberts (PPV)
Ring announcer	Arkady Aura (Pre-show)
Referees	Aubrey Edwards
Referees	Bryce Remsburg
Referees	Mike Posey
Referees	Paul Turner
Referees	Rick Knox
Referees	Stephon Smith
Pre-show hosts	Renee Paquette
Pre-show hosts	RJ City
Pre-show hosts	Jeff Jarrett
Pre-show hosts	Paul Walter Hauser

Revolution featured professional wrestling matches that involved different wrestlers from pre-existing scripted feuds and storylines, written by AEW's writers. Storylines were produced on AEW's weekly television programs, Dynamite and Collision.

At Worlds End on December 28, Jon Moxley retained his AEW World Championship in a four-way match in the main event only for FTR (Dax Harwood and Cash Wheeler) and Adam Copeland, who was returning from a seven-month hiatus, to confront him afterwards. At Fight for the Fallen on January 1, Copeland, now known as simply "Cope", and FTR defeated Death Riders. Over the course of the following weeks Jay White, whom was one of the three other competitors in the four-way match at Worlds End, would become involved in Cope's feud with Moxley. On the January 22 episode of Dynamite, Cope defeated Pac only to be shown on the TitanTron that Death Riders had kidnapped Harwood, Wheeler and Rock 'n' Roll Express (Robert Gibson and Ricky Morton). Claudio Castagnoli then con-chair-toed Morton before attacking Cope and White in the ring. This would lead to a Brisbane Brawl at Grand Slam Australia on February 15 which Death Riders won. Following the loss, Cope vowed to dismantle Death Riders one-by-one. Starting with Pac on the February 22 episode of Collision, hitting Pac with a con-chair-to. On the February 26 episode of Dynamite with the help of White and Willow Nightingale, Cope took out Castagnoli and Marina Shafir, leaving Moxley and Wheeler Yuta left. On the March 5 episode of Dynamite, Cope defeated Yuta. After the match, an argument erupted in the ring between Yuta and Moxley, leading to Yuta walking away. Moxley then said that he would look forward to beating Cope at Revolution.

At Maximum Carnage on January 18 (taped January 16) "Hangman" Adam Page defeated Christopher Daniels in a Texas Death match. After the match, Daniels announced his retirement, making his loss to Page his final match. On the January 22 episode of Dynamite Daniels confronted Page telling him that he won and that he was retired, in turn making Page question his attitude towards Daniels. On the February 12 episode of Dynamite MJF defeated Dustin Rhodes but continued to attack him after the match until Page fended MJF off. The following week on Dynamite both men engaged in a promo exchange which lead to a brawl. On the February 26, 2025 episode of Dynamite MJF attacked Daniels backstage in order to get back at Page, as by now, Page had become remorseful of his treatment towards Daniels. A match for Reveloution between Page and MJF was set up shortly afterwards.

On the September 11 episode of Dynamite, Will Ospreay teamed with Kyle Fletcher to win a tag team Casino Gauntlet match to earn a shot at The Young Bucks' AEW World Tag Team Championship at Grand Slam on September 25, but failed to win the titles at the event. At WrestleDream on October 12, after Ospreay had lost his AEW International Championship to Konosuke Takeshita, Fletcher would attack Ospreay, ending their alliance On 23 November at Full Gear, Ospreay was defeated by Fletcher. The next day, Ospreay was announced as a participant in the 2024 Continental Classic, where he was placed in the Gold league. Ospreay finished the tournament with 9 points and advanced to the playoff stage on 28 December at Worlds End. At Worlds End, Ospreay defeated Fletcher in the semi-finals, but lost to Kazuchika Okada in the grand finals. On the January 8, 2025 episode of Dynamite, Ospreay came to the aid of Kenny Omega from an attack by the Don Callis Family. At Grand Slam Australia on 15 February, Ospreay and Omega defeated Fletcher and Takeshita in a tag-team match. A match was later set up between Fletcher and Ospreay in a Steel Cage match.

At the start of 2024, Mariah May became Toni Storm's "understudy" and protégé. At Revolution Mariah May adopted Storm's previous "Rockstar" persona, including wearing Storm's old ring attire and entrance music, and would begin wrestling matches on Dynamite and Collison in this persona as a tribute to her mentor Storm. At Forbidden Door, Storm retained the title against Mina Shirakawa, May's tag team partner in World Wonder Ring Stardom, and following the match Storm, May and Shirakawa put aside their differences with a three-way kiss. Throughout the Storm/Shirakawa rivalry, it had been teased that May was conflicted about who to side with, her mentor Storm or former Stardom tag partner Shirakawa, and that she was romantically tied to both women. On the July 10 episode of Dynamite, Storm was attacked by May after May defeated Willow Nightingale in the finals of the Owen Hart Foundation Women's Tournament to earn a shot at her AEW Women's World Championship on August 25 at All In, turning face after being a tweener alongside May for months while May fully turned heel. On August 25 at All In, Storm lost the AEW Women's World Championship to May, ending her third reign at 281 days. After nearly four months on hiatus, Storm made her return on December 11 at Winter is Coming, now under her "Rockstar" persona, where she confronted May after her successful title defense against Shirakawa. After returning, Storm began acting as if she just made her debut in AEW. After winning a Casino Gauntlet match at Maximum Carnage to earn title shot against May, she returned to her "Timeless" persona, revealing her "Rockstar" act was all a ruse. On February 15, 2025 at Grand Slam Australia, Storm defeated May to win the AEW Women's World Champion for a record-setting fourth time. It was then announced Storm would face May in a "Hollywood Ending" Falls Count Anywhere match which would serve an end to their feud.

In late 2024, Swerve Strickland began a feud with Ricochet. On the February 5, 2025 episode of Dynamite, Strickland was defeated by Ricochet, who proceeded to steal the "Embassy" robe that Strickland wore in honor of Jimmy Rave. It was then announced Ricochet would take on Strickland with the winner getting an AEW World Championship match.

Going into Revolution The Murder Machines (Brian Cage and Lance Archer) were demanding an AEW World Tag Team Championship opportunity against The Hurt Syndicate. At the same time, The Outrunners (Truth Magnum and Turbo Floyd) were also wanting a title opportunity. On the February 26 episode of Dynamite The Outrunners defeated The Murder Machines in order to get a AEW World Tag Team Championship opportunity. The match was later made official for Revolution.

At Grand Slam Australia, Kazuchika Okada defeated Buddy Matthews to retain his AEW Continental Championship. Okada then began a feud with Matthews' Hounds of Hell stablemate Brody King, with Okada interrupting King's backstage promo and later attacking him in the ring later that night on the March 1 episode of Collision. A match for Okada's AEW Continental Championship was later made official for Revolution.

== Results ==
No.	Results	Stipulations	Times
1^{P}	Komander and Hologram (with Alex Abrahantes) defeated Lee Johnson and Blake Christian by pinfall	Tag team match	9:55
2^{P}	Daniel Garcia and The Undisputed Kingdom (Adam Cole, Roderick Strong, and Kyle O'Reilly) defeated Shane Taylor Promotions (Shane Taylor, Carlie Bravo, Lee Moriarty, and Capt. Shawn Dean) by submission	Eight-man tag team match	9:10
3^{P}	"Big Boom!" A.J. and The Conglomeration (Orange Cassidy and Mark Briscoe) (with Big Justice and The Rizzler) defeated Johnny TV and MxM Collection (Mansoor and Mason Madden) (with Taya Valkyrie) by pinfall	Trios match	12:55
4	"Hangman" Adam Page defeated MJF by pinfall	Singles match	19:10
5	Mercedes Moné (c) defeated Momo Watanabe by submission	Singles match for the AEW TBS Championship	18:30
6	Swerve Strickland (with Prince Nana) defeated Ricochet by pinfall	Singles match to determine the #1 contender to the AEW World Championship	18:10
7	Kazuchika Okada (c) defeated Brody King by pinfall	Singles match for the AEW Continental Championship	10:55
8	The Hurt Syndicate (Bobby Lashley and Shelton Benjamin) (c) (with MVP) defeated The Outrunners (Turbo Floyd and Truth Magnum) by pinfall	Tag team match for the AEW World Tag Team Championship	8:40
9	"Timeless" Toni Storm (c) (with Luther) defeated Mariah May by pinfall	Falls Count Anywhere match for the AEW Women's World Championship	12:55
10	Kenny Omega defeated Konosuke Takeshita (c) (with Don Callis) by pinfall	Singles match for the AEW International Championship	28:30
11	Will Ospreay defeated Kyle Fletcher by pinfall	Steel Cage match	29:00
12	Jon Moxley (c) defeated Adam Copeland and Christian Cage by technical submission (Note: This was originally a scheduled singles match between Moxley and Cope, but while the match was in progress, Cage executed his Casino Gauntlet championship match contract to make it a three-way.)	Three-way match for the AEW World Championship; This was Cage's Casino Gauntlet guaranteed championship match.	26:35
(c) / – the champion(s) heading into the match; P / – the match was broadcast on the pre-show
