= 2026 Continental Classic =

Professional wrestling tournament

AEW Continental Classic
Tournament information
- Sport: Professional wrestling
- Location: United States; Mexico
- Dates: November 18, 2026–December 19, 2026
- Tournament format: Two-block round-robin tournament
- Host: All Elite Wrestling
- Venue: Various arenas (see matches)
- Participants: 12

The 2026 Continental Classic (C2) is a professional wrestling round-robin tournament hosted by the American promotion All Elite Wrestling (AEW). The fourth annual edition of the AEW Continental Classic will begin on the November 18, 2026 episode of Dynamite, and will culminate at the Worlds End pay-per-view (PPV) event on December 19, 2026. Tournament matches will be held under "Continental Rules", which feature a 20-minute time limit with no one allowed at ringside and outside interference strictly prohibited. The prize of the tournament is the AEW Continental Championship.

== Overview ==
Established in 2023, the Continental Classic (C2) is an annual professional wrestling tournament hosted by All Elite Wrestling (AEW) that starts after the promotion's Full Gear pay-per-view (PPV) event in mid-November and ends at the Worlds End PPV at the end of December. The tournament takes place in a round-robin format, with two blocks of six wrestlers – titled the Blue and Gold Leagues – wrestling each other across AEW's television shows, Dynamite, and Collision.

Matches are held under "Continental Rules": each match has 20-minute time limit, no other wrestlers are allowed at ringside, and outside interference is strictly prohibited under threat of penalty. Similar to most soccer leagues, match winners obtain three points for a win, and drawn matches give one point to each participant, and ties are broken based on head-to-head record. After the round-robin phase, the winner of each league will face the runner-up of the opposite league in a playoff match to determine the two championship finalists, who will wrestle each other for the AEW Continental Championship at Worlds End.

The full Continental Classic field was announced in a Selection Special on the evening of November 17:

| League | Wrestler | Notes |
|---|---|---|
| Blue | Bandido | Two-time and current ROH World Champion. ROH Survival of the Fittest winner (2021); Dynamite Diamond Ring winner (2025). Continental Classic debutant. |
| Blue | Daniel Garcia | One-time AEW TNT Champion. Third Continental Classic appearance. |
| Blue | Brody King | Three-time AEW World Trios Champion and one-time AEW World Tag Team Champion. Third Continental Classic appearance. |
| Blue | Adam Page | Two-time AEW World Champion. Owen Hart Cup winner (2025). One G1 Climax appearance. Continental Classic debutant. |
| Blue | Ricochet | One-time AEW National Champion. Best of the Super Juniors winner (2014). Second Continental Classic appearance; 2024 Gold League winner. |
| Blue | Jay White | Two-time IWGP Heavyweight Champion. Four G1 Climax appearances. Second Continental Classic appearance. |
| Gold | Mike Bailey | Two-time AEW World Trios Champion. Second Continental Classic appearance. |
| Gold | Orange Cassidy | Two-time AEW International Champion. Second Continental Classic appearance. |
| Gold | Tommaso Ciampa | One-time AEW National Champion and one-time AEW TNT Champion. Continental Classic debut. |
| Gold | Kevin Knight | One-time AEW TNT Champion. Second Continental Classic appearance. |
| Gold | Jon Moxley | Incumbent AEW Continental Champion. Four-time AEW World Champion; one-time IWGP Heavyweight Champion; one-time WWE Champion. AEW Continental Challenge Cup winner (2026). Third Continental Classic appearance; 2025 winner. |
| Gold | Nick Wayne | One-time AEW World Trios Champion. Continental Classic debut. |

== Matches ==
Legend
| Blue League match |
| Gold League match |
| Semifinal match |
| Tournament final match |

Tournament matches
| Dates | Show | Venue | Matches | | Time |
|---|---|---|---|---|---|
| November 18 | Dynamite | Mission Ballroom; Denver, Colorado | G | Orange Cassidy defeats Jon Moxley by pinfall | 15:48 |
| November 18 | Dynamite | Mission Ballroom; Denver, Colorado | G | Nick Wayne defeats Mike Bailey by pinfall | 11:50 |
| November 18 | Dynamite | Mission Ballroom; Denver, Colorado | B | Bandido defeats Adam Page by pinfall | 14:16 |
| November 21 | Collision | Resch Center; Green Bay, Wisconsin | G | Kevin Knight defeats Tommaso Ciampa | 15:34 |
| November 21 | Collision | Resch Center; Green Bay, Wisconsin | B | Brody King defeats Daniel Garcia | 9:33 |
| November 21 | Collision | Resch Center; Green Bay, Wisconsin | B | Jay White defeats Ricochet | 14:53 |
Further matches to be announced.
| December 19 | Worlds End | Target Center; Minneapolis, Minnesota | SF | Blue League winner vs. Gold League runner-up | |
| December 19 | Worlds End | Target Center; Minneapolis, Minnesota | SF | Gold League winner vs. Blue League runner-up | |
| December 19 | Worlds End | Target Center; Minneapolis, Minnesota | F | Semifinal #1 winner vs. Semifinal #2 winner | |

== Leagues ==
Participants
| Blue League | | Gold League | |
|---|---|---|---|
| Bandido | 3 | Orange Cassidy | 3 |
| Brody King | 3 | Nick Wayne | 3 |
| Daniel Garcia | 0 | Tommaso Ciampa | 0 |
| Ricochet | 0 | Kevin Knight | 3 |
| Jay White | 3 | Mike Bailey | 0 |
| Adam Page | 0 | Jon Moxley (c) | 0 |
(c) – the incumbent champion at the beginning of the tournament

Tournament overview
| Blue League | Bandido | Garcia | King | Page | Ricochet | White |
|---|---|---|---|---|---|---|
| Bandido | —N/a | | | Bandido (14:16) | | |
| Garcia | | —N/a | King (time) | | | |
| King | | King (time) | —N/a | | | |
| Page | Bandido (14:16) | | | —N/a | | |
| Ricochet | | | | | —N/a | White (time) |
| White | | | | | White (time) | —N/a |
| Gold League | Bailey | Cassidy | Ciampa | Knight | Moxley | Wayne |
| Bailey | —N/a | | | | | Wayne (11:50) |
| Cassidy | | —N/a | | | Cassidy (15:48) | |
| Ciampa | | | —N/a | Knight (time) | | |
| Knight | | | Knight (time) | —N/a | | |
| Moxley | | Cassidy (15:48) | | | —N/a | |
| Wayne | Wayne (11:50) | | | | | —N/a |

Semifinals; Worlds End; December 19, 2026
B1
G2
G1
B2

Championship Final; Worlds End; December 19, 2026

== See also ==
- List of All Elite Wrestling tournaments
