= Worlds End (2024) =

All Elite Wrestling pay-per-view event

- Promotional poster featuring various AEW wrestlers
- Promotion: All Elite Wrestling
- Date: December 28, 2024
- City: Orlando, Florida
- Venue: Addition Financial Arena
- Attendance: 7,005
- Buy rate: 115,000

Pay-per-view chronology
← Previous; Full Gear	Next → Wrestle Dynasty

Worlds End chronology
← Previous; 2023	Next → 2025

The 2024 Worlds End was a professional wrestling pay-per-view (PPV) event produced by All Elite Wrestling (AEW). It was the second annual Worlds End and took place on December 28, 2024, at the Addition Financial Arena in Orlando, Florida. (Note: The venue is on the main campus of the University of Central Florida, which despite its Orlando mailing address is actually in unincorporated Orange County.) The event hosted the semifinals and finals of the 2024 Continental Classic.

Eleven matches were contested at the event, including three on the "Zero Hour" pre-show. In the main event, Jon Moxley defeated Orange Cassidy, "Hangman" Adam Page, and Jay White in a four-way match to retain the AEW World Championship. In other prominent matches, Mercedes Moné defeated Kris Statlander to retain the AEW TBS Championship in what was the longest women's match in AEW history, MJF defeated Adam Cole in the Dynamite Diamond Final to retain the AEW Dynamite Diamond Ring, and Kazuchika Okada defeated Will Ospreay in the Continental Classic final to retain the AEW Continental Championship. The event also saw the returns of Kenny Omega and Adam Copeland, who had both been out of action for several months due to illness and injury, respectively.

== Production ==
=== Background ===
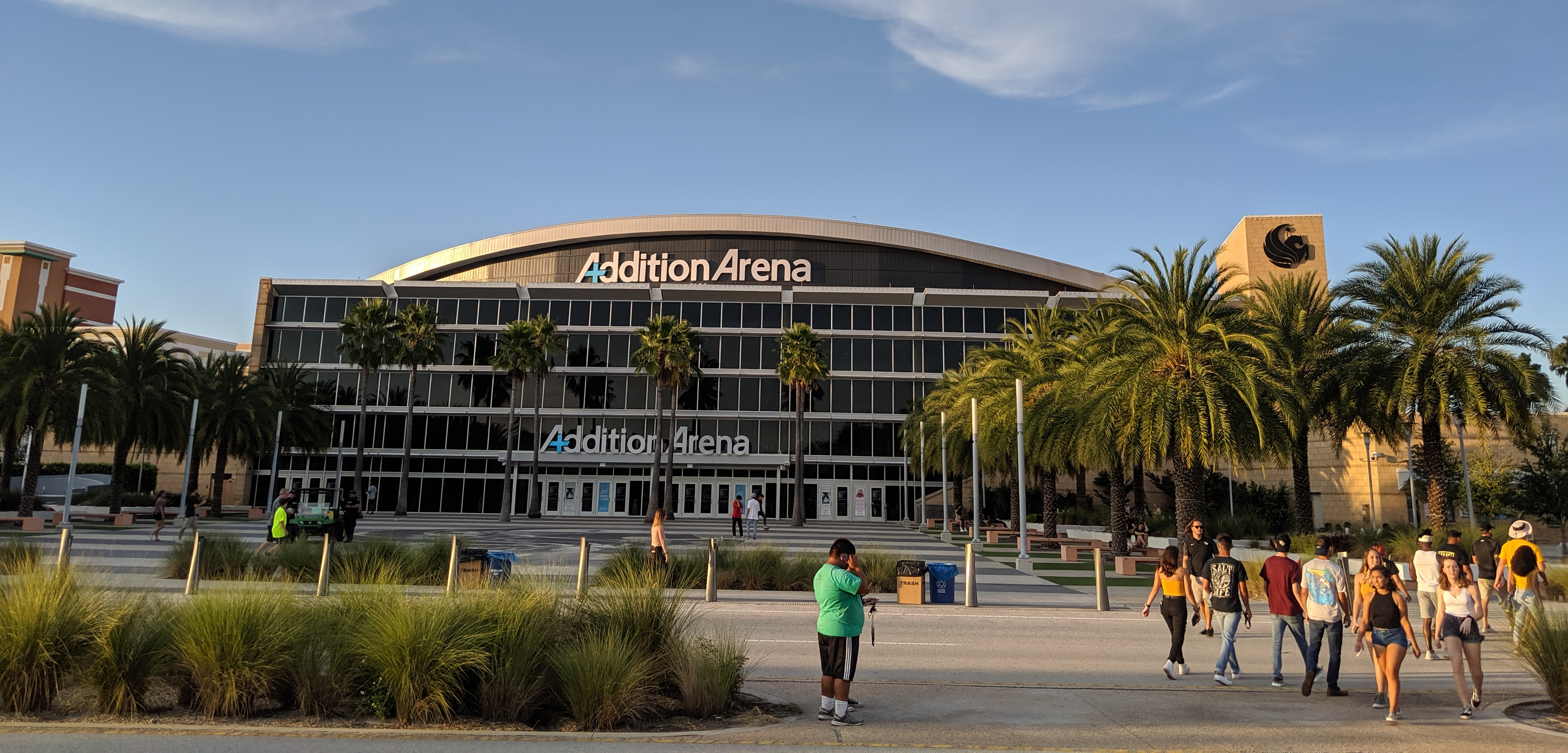
The event was held at the Addition Financial Arena in Orlando, Florida.

In December 2023, the American professional wrestling promotion All Elite Wrestling (AEW) held a pay-per-view (PPV) event titled Worlds End, which hosted the finals of the first-ever Continental Classic for the inaugural AEW Continental Championship. On April 11, 2024, AEW announced that the second Worlds End event would take place on December 28, 2024, at the Addition Financial Arena in Orlando, Florida, located on the campus of the University of Central Florida, thus establishing Worlds End as an annual PPV and the host for the finals of the annual Continental Classic (C2).

=== Storylines ===
Worlds End featured professional wrestling matches that were the result of pre-existing feuds and storylines, with results being predetermined by AEW's writers. Storylines were produced on AEW's weekly television programs, Dynamite, Collision, and Rampage.

Due to being the incumbent Continental Champion, Kazuchika Okada was the first to be entered into the 2024 Continental Classic. On November 24, the rest of the 12-man field was announced. Okada, Shelton Benjamin, Mark Briscoe, Daniel Garcia, Kyle Fletcher, and The Beast Mortos were drawn into the Blue League, while Darby Allin, Claudio Castagnoli, Brody King, Will Ospreay, Ricochet, and Juice Robinson were drawn into the Gold League. (Note: Juice Robinson sustained an injury in his first match against Will Ospreay; he was replaced for the remainder of the tournament by Komander.) The two leagues featured a round-robin tournament format over the following weeks, with the top two wrestlers in each block at the conclusion of the league phase securing semifinal matches at Worlds End. During Dynamite's Christmas Day special, Dynamite on 34th Street, Fletcher and Okada secured their spots in the semifinals as Blue League representatives, and Ricochet and Ospreay as Gold League representatives, setting up a first-time bout between Ricochet and Okada, and a rematch from Full Gear between Fletcher and Ospreay.

Throughout 2023, Adam Cole befriended reigning AEW World Champion MJF, becoming a team called Better Than You Bay Bay, and they eventually won the ROH World Tag Team Championship. Also during this time, MJF became the target of an individual wearing a devil's mask, the same mask MJF had worn prior to becoming AEW World Champion as he had called himself the devil. Cole, however, got injured, leaving MJF to defend the ROH Tag Titles on his own, which he eventually lost to a team referred to as The Devil's Masked Men. At the 2023 Worlds End, MJF lost the AEW World Championship and after the match, he was attacked by The Devil's Masked Men with Cole revealed to be the "devil" that had been targeting MJF, with The Devil's Masked Men revealed to be Cole's Undisputed Kingdom stablemates, Matt Taven and Mike Bennett, turning Cole heel. MJF then took time off due to an injury, but returned a few months later as a heel again. After being cleared himself, making The Undisputed Kingdom a face stable, a now face Cole eventually reignited his feud with MJF and tried to earn a match against him at Full Gear, but came up short. The Dynamite Dozen Battle Royal then occurred during the December 4 episode of Dynamite. Cole entered and he and Kyle O'Reilly co-won the match. It was then announced that they would face each other in the Dynamite Diamond Semifinal at Dynamite: Winter Is Coming the following week with the winner facing MJF at Worlds End in the Dynamite Diamond Final for the AEW Dynamite Diamond Ring—MJF being a five-time ring holder, having won it every year since it was established in 2019. Cole defeated O'Reilly to finally face MJF at Worlds End.

== Event ==
Other on-screen personnel
Role	Name
Commentators	Excalibur (Pre-show and PPV)
Commentators	Tony Schiavone (Pre-show and PPV)
Commentators	Nigel McGuinness (Pre-show and PPV)
Commentators	Jim Ross (last 2 matches)
Commentators	Don Callis (International title match)
Spanish Commentators	Carlos Cabrera
Spanish Commentators	Alvaro Riojas
Spanish Commentators	Ariel Levy
Ring announcer	Justin Roberts
Referees	Aubrey Edwards
Referees	Bryce Remsburg
Referees	Mike Posey
Referees	Paul Turner
Referees	Rick Knox
Referees	Stephon Smith
Interviewer	Lexy Nair
Pre-show hosts	Renee Paquette
Pre-show hosts	RJ City
Pre-show hosts	Matt Menard
Pre-show hosts	Mark Briscoe
Pre-show hosts	Daniel Garcia

=== Zero Hour ===
In the opening match on the Zero Hour show, Toni Storm took on Leila Grey. In the end, Grey attempted a suplex but Storm rolled her up for the win.

Up next Jeff Jarrett faced off against QT Marshall. In the end, Aaron Solo ran down to the ring and distracted Jarrett which allowed Marshall to roll Jarrett up but Jarrett kicked out. Marshall then hit The Stroke on Jarrett and ordered Solo to grab Jarrett's guitar but Jay Lethal ran down to the ring and stopped Solo and they brawled on the outside before brawling to the backstage area. Jarrett then hit The Stroke on Marshall for the three count.

Backstage, Lexy Nair interviewed Toni Storm until Deonna Purrazzo confronted her and challenged her to a match on the January 4 episode of Collision. Toni accepted and thanked Purrazzo for giving her the opportunity.

In the final match on the Zero Hour show it was an Eight-man tag team match with Lio Rush, Action Andretti, and Murder Machines (Lance Archer and Brian Cage), who were accompanied by Don Callis faced The Outrunners (Truth Magnum and Turbo Floyd) and Top Flight (Darius Martin and Dante Martin), who were accompanied by Leila Grey. Don Callis joined commentary for this match. In the end, Archer and Cage hit a chokeslam and powerbomb combination on Dante Martin. Rush then tagged himself in and hit a frog splash on Martin for the win. After the match, the two teams argued over the pin. Then the AEW World Tag Team Champions Private Party (Isiah Kassidy and Marq Quen) came out and taunted Andretti and Rush.

=== Main Show ===
In the opening match on the main show, Will Ospreay faced off against Kyle Fletcher in the Continental Classic Semifinal with the winner facing the winner of the other Semifinal match later in the night. In the end, Ospreay hit the Hidden Blade on Fletcher but Fletcher kicked out. Fletcher then hit Ospreay with a brain buster but Ospreay kicked out. Ospreay then hit the Styles Clash on Fletcher for the victory and advancing himself to the finals later in the night.

After that, Kazuchika Okada took on Ricochet in the Continental Classic Semifinal with the winner facing Will Ospreay in the finals later in the night. In the end, Okada hit the Rainmaker on Ricochet for the win and advancing to the finals later in the night. After the match Swerve Strickland came out on the ramp while Prince Nana gave fans at ringside toilet rolls. Strickland then wished Ricochet a happy new year while fans threw the toilet rolls at Ricochet.

Up next, Mariah May defended her AEW Women's Championship against Thunder Rosa in a Tijuana Street Fight. In the end, May hit the Storm Zero off the apron through a table on Rosa to retain her AEW Women's Championship.

After that was the Dynamite Diamond Final where MJF defended the AEW Dynamite Diamond Ring against Adam Cole with Cole's stablemates of The Undisputed Kingdom, Mike Bennett and Matt Taven, serving as ringside enforcers so MJF could not use the championship ring during the match. In the end, MJF approached Bennett and Taven on the outside while the referee was tending to Cole in the ring and MJF pretended to have been attacked by both men with referee Bryce Remsburg ejected both men from ringside. MJF put the ring on and came into the ring but got superkicked by Cole. Bennett and Taven came back down to ringside and protested the referee ejecting them and, with the referee's back turned, MJF hit Cole with the Dynamite Diamond Ring and hit the Heat Seeker on Cole to retain the ring for a sixth consecutive year. After the match, MJF grabbed a steel chair and wrapped it around Cole's leg but Undisputed Kingdom's Roderick Strong came out and stopped him. Kyle O'Reilly came out and threw MJF in the ring. O'Reilly and Strong then attacked MJF and held MJF up for Cole to hit him with the Dynamite Diamond Ring. All five men then embraced in the ring and on the ramp.

Up next, Konosuke Takeshita, who was accompanied by Don Callis, defended his AEW International Championship against Powerhouse Hobbs. Callis joined commentary for this match. In the end, Takeshita hit Hobbs with the Raging Fire and pinned him for the win and to retain his AEW International Championship.

After that, Mercedes Moné defended her AEW TBS Championship against Kris Statlander. In the end, both Moné and Statlander tumbled to the outside. Statlander's boot was caught in the apron and was thus forced to remove it. Moné then started stomping on Statlander's leg and hit a meterora from the apron to the outside on Statlander. Statlander barely made it in the ring for a count of ten. Moné hit a piledriver on the apron to Statlander who again barely made it in the ring for a count of ten. Statlander then attempted the Staturday Night Fever but Moné countered and rolled Statlander up for the win thus retaining her AEW TBS Championship. After Moné had left, Statlander received a standing ovation from the crowd.

In the penultimate match, Kazuchika Okada defended his AEW Continental Championship against Will Ospreay in the finals of the Continental Classic tournament with the winner also winner or, in Okada's case, retaining the AEW Continental Championship. In the end, Okada jumped off the top rope for an elbow drop. Okada hit Ospreay with a dropkick. Ospreay hit the Styles Clash but Okada kicked out. Okada hit the Rainmaker on Ospreay but Ospreay kicked out. Okada attempted the Rainmaker on Ospreay but Ospreay hit a standing spanish fly. Ospreay attempted the Os-cutter on Okada but Okada countered with a dropkick. Ospreay hit the Rainmaker on Okada but Okada kicked out. Ospreay attempted a Hidden Blade on Okada but Okada ducked and hit Ospreay with the Rainmaker and then pinned Ospreay to win the Continental Classic and to retain his AEW Continental Championship. After the match, Christopher Daniels came out and said he would normally congratulate Okada but this time would not before revealing he is no longer AEW's Executive Vice President. He then introduced a returning Kenny Omega. In the ring, Omega gave Okada the AEW Continental Championship and shook his hand.

=== Main Event ===
In the main event it was a four-way match with Jon Moxley (accompanied by Marina Shafir) defending his AEW World Championship against "Hangman" Adam Page, Jay White, and Orange Cassidy. In the end, Cassidy hit Page with a Stundog Millionare and then White hit Page with a hurracanrana. Moxley hit White with a knee strike and delivered a cutter to Cassidy. Page and Moxley then began to exchanged forearms in the middle of the ring until Cassidy hit a DDT on Moxley. Page hit a discus lariat on White and Cassidy hit White with the Orange Punch. Cassidy attempted to pin Moxley but Page dragged the referee out the ring. Page hit the Buckshot Lariat on Cassidy and then Page hit Moxley with the Dead Eye. Moxley's stablemate of Death Riders Wheeler Yuta then grabbed Page's boot while Shafir passed Moxley a chair but Page kicked the chair away and out of reach and hit Moxley with the Buckshot Lariat. Page then hit Cassidy with a low blow and White hit Page and then Moxley consecutively with the Blade Runner and White pinned Moxley but Yuta came into the ring and attacked the referee ultimately breaking up the pin. Shafir snuck into the ring but White intercepted her and hit her with the Blade Runner. Moxley then hit the Death Rider on White and pinned him for the win and to retain the AEW World Championship. After the match FTR (Dax Harwood and Cash Wheeler) appeared and then a returning Adam Copeland came out on the ramp. They ran into the ring with the Death Riders retreating. Copeland then told Moxley on the microphone that they were taking it all. A trios match was subsequently made official for Fight for the Fallen on January 1, 2025.

== Results ==
No.	Results	Stipulations	Times
1^{P}	Toni Storm defeated Leila Grey by pinfall	Singles match	6:50
2^{P}	Jeff Jarrett defeated QT Marshall by pinfall	Singles match	9:25
3^{P}	Lio Rush, Action Andretti, and Murder Machines (Lance Archer and Brian Cage) (with Don Callis) defeated The Outrunners (Truth Magnum and Turbo Floyd) and Top Flight (Darius Martin and Dante Martin) (with Leila Grey) by pinfall	Eight-man tag team match	10:50
4	Will Ospreay defeated Kyle Fletcher by pinfall	Continental Classic Semifinal	16:20
5	Kazuchika Okada (c) defeated Ricochet by pinfall	Continental Classic Semifinal; Had Okada lost, he would have vacated the AEW Continental Championship, which would have guaranteed a new Continental Champion in the final.	13:00
6	Mariah May (c) defeated Thunder Rosa by pinfall	Tijuana Street Fight for the AEW Women's World Championship	13:10
7	MJF (ring holder) defeated Adam Cole (with Matt Taven and Mike Bennett) by pinfall	Dynamite Diamond Final for the AEW Dynamite Diamond Ring; The Undisputed Kingdom (Mike Bennett and Matt Taven) were the special guest enforcers.	14:35
8	Konosuke Takeshita (c) (with Don Callis) defeated Powerhouse Hobbs by pinfall	Singles match for the AEW International Championship	16:30
9	Mercedes Moné (c) defeated Kris Statlander by pinfall	Singles match for the AEW TBS Championship	24:35
10	Kazuchika Okada (c) defeated Will Ospreay by pinfall	Continental Classic Final for the AEW Continental Championship	19:15
11	Jon Moxley (c) (with Marina Shafir) defeated Orange Cassidy, "Hangman" Adam Page, and Jay White by pinfall	Four-way match for the AEW World Championship	17:00
(c) / – the champion(s) heading into the match; P / – the match was broadcast on the pre-show

=== Continental Classic Tournament ===
Legend
Qualified to semifinal

Participants
Blue League		Gold League	
Kyle Fletcher	12	Ricochet	10
Kazuchika Okada (c)	10	Will Ospreay (Note: Ospreay advanced to the semifinals due to his head-to-head victory over Castagnoli.)	9
Mark Briscoe	9	Claudio Castagnoli	9
Daniel Garcia	7	Darby Allin	7
Shelton Benjamin	6	Brody King	6
The Beast Mortos	0	Komander	3
(c) – the incumbent champion at the beginning of the tournament

Tournament overview
Blue League	Benjamin	Briscoe	Fletcher	Garcia	Mortos	Okada
Benjamin	—N/a	Benjamin (11:44)	Fletcher (15:48)	Garcia (12:16)	Benjamin (8:47)	Okada (12:37)
Briscoe	Benjamin (11:44)	—N/a	Briscoe (19:44)	Briscoe (16:22)	Briscoe (11:38)	Okada (13:26)
Fletcher	Fletcher (15:48)	Briscoe (19:44)	—N/a	Fletcher (15:06)	Fletcher (9:52)	Fletcher (16:57)
Garcia	Garcia (12:16)	Briscoe (16:22)	Fletcher (15:06)	—N/a	Garcia (10:25)	Draw (20:00)
Mortos	Benjamin (8:47)	Briscoe (11:38)	Fletcher (9:52)	Garcia (10:25)	—N/a	Okada (12:44)
Okada	Okada (12:37)	Okada (13:26)	Fletcher (16:57)	Draw (20:00)	Okada (12:44)	—N/a
Gold League	Allin	Castagnoli	King	Komander	Ospreay	Ricochet
Allin	—N/a	Castagnoli (11:16)	King (9:35)	Allin (13:11)	Allin (14:38)	Draw (20:00)
Castagnoli	Castagnoli (11:16)	—N/a	Castagnoli (14:17)	Komander (7:37)	Ospreay (13:26)	Castagnoli (13:01)
King	King (9:35)	Castagnoli (14:17)	—N/a	King (14:51)	Ospreay (15:30)	Ricochet (12:46)
Komander	Allin (13:11)	Komander (7:37)	King (14:51)	—N/a	Ospreay (12:34)	Ricochet (12:28)
Ospreay	Allin (14:38)	Ospreay (13:26)	Ospreay (15:30)	Ospreay (12:34)	—N/a	Ricochet (14:27)
Ricochet	Draw (20:00)	Castagnoli (13:01)	Ricochet (12:46)	Ricochet (12:28)	Ricochet (14:27)	—N/a

Semifinals; Worlds End (December 28)
B1	Kyle Fletcher	16:21
G2	Will Ospreay	Pin
G1	Ricochet	12:55
B2	Kazuchika Okada (c)	Pin

Championship Final; Worlds End (December 28)
G2	Will Ospreay	19:12
B2	Kazuchika Okada (c)	Pin
