= Dynamite on 34th Street (2024) =

All Elite Wrestling television special

- Promotional poster featuring various AEW wrestlers
- Promotion: All Elite Wrestling
- Date: December 22, 2024 (aired December 25, 2024)
- City: New York City, New York
- Venue: Hammerstein Ballroom
- Attendance: 1,491

AEW Dynamite special episodes chronology
← Previous; Holiday Bash	Next → Fight for the Fallen

The 2024 Dynamite on 34th Street was the inaugural Dynamite on 34th Street professional wrestling television special produced by All Elite Wrestling (AEW). It took place on December 22, 2024, at the Hammerstein Ballroom in New York City, New York, and aired on tape delay on December 25 as a special Christmas Day episode of Wednesday Night Dynamite on TBS in the United States.

== Production ==
=== Background ===
AEW Dynamite is the flagship weekly television program of the American professional wrestling company All Elite Wrestling (AEW). On November 18, 2024, AEW filed to trademark "Dynamite on 34th Street". On November 28, as part of AEW's two-week span of holiday-themed programming, the company announced that "Dynamite on 34th Street" would be a special Christmas episode of Wednesday Night Dynamite and would take place on December 22, 2024, from the Hammerstein Ballroom in New York City, New York, and aired on tape delay on Christmas Day on December 25 on TBS in the United States.

=== Storylines ===
Dynamite on 34th Street featured six professional wrestling matches that involved different wrestlers from pre-existing scripted feuds and storylines. Storylines were produced on AEW's weekly television programs, Dynamite, Rampage, and Collision.

== Results ==
No.	Results	Stipulations	Times
1	Will Ospreay defeated Brody King by pinfall	AEW Continental Classic Gold League match	15:30
2	Darby Allin vs. Ricochet ended in a time limit draw	AEW Continental Classic Blue League match	20:00
3	Komander defeated Claudio Castagnoli by pinfall	AEW Continental Classic Gold League match	7:40
4	Kazuchika Okada defeated Shelton Benjamin by pinfall	AEW Continental Classic Blue League match	12:40
5	Toni Storm defeated Taya Valkyrie (with Deonna Purrazzo) by pinfall	Singles match	7:05
6	Kyle Fletcher defeated Daniel Garcia by pinfall	AEW Continental Classic Blue League match	15:05
