= Holiday Bash (2024) =

All Elite Wrestling two-part television special

- Promotional poster featuring various AEW wrestlers
- Promotion: All Elite Wrestling
- Date: December 18, 2024 (aired December 18 and 20, 2024)
- City: Washington, D.C.
- Venue: Entertainment & Sports Arena
- Attendance: 3,030

Holiday Bash chronology
← Previous; 2023	Next → 2025

AEW Dynamite special episodes chronology
← Previous; Winter Is Coming	Next → Dynamite on 34th Street

AEW Rampage special episodes chronology
← Previous; Winter Is Coming	Next → New Year's Smash

The 2024 Holiday Bash was a two-part professional wrestling television special produced by All Elite Wrestling (AEW). It was the fifth annual Holiday Bash and took place on December 18, 2024, at the Entertainment & Sports Arena in Washington, D.C., airing as Christmas-themed episodes of Wednesday Night Dynamite and Friday Night Rampage. Dynamite aired live on TBS while Rampage was taped the same night and aired on tape delay on TNT on December 20. This was a minor broadcast change from the previous year, as it had aired in three-parts that included Saturday Night Collision which instead aired as a different special called Christmas Collision.

== Production ==
=== Background ===
Holiday Bash is an annual professional wrestling Christmas television special produced by All Elite Wrestling (AEW) since 2020. While the original event only aired as a special episode of AEW's flagship program, Wednesday Night Dynamite, the 2021 event expanded it to a two-part event, with the second part airing as a special episode of Friday Night Rampage (although in 2021, Rampage aired on Saturday instead of its usual Friday slot). The 2023 event was then expanded to a three-part event, with the third night airing as a special episode of Saturday Night Collision, AEW's third weekly program that launched in June 2023.

For the 2024 event, Holiday Bash was reduced back to two parts, airing as Dynamite and Rampage due to that week's episode of Collision airing as a different special called Christmas Collision. The event was held on December 18, 2024, from the Entertainment & Sports Arena in Washington, D.C.. Dynamite aired live on TBS while Rampage was taped the same night and aired on tape delay on December 20 on TNT.

=== Storylines ===
Holiday Bash featured professional wrestling matches that involved different wrestlers from pre-existing scripted feuds and storylines. Storylines were produced on AEW's weekly television programs, Dynamite, Rampage, and Collision.

== Results ==
Dynamite (aired live December 18)
No.	Results	Stipulations	Times
1^{D}	Nyla Rose defeated Jordan Blade by pinfall	Singles match	—
2^{D}	Satnam Singh defeated Aaron Solo by pinfall	Singles match	—
3^{D}	Serpentico defeated Richard Holliday by pinfall	Singles match	—
4	Mercedes Moné (c) defeated Anna Jay by pinfall	Singles match for the AEW TBS Championship	10:30
5	The Patriarchy (Christian Cage and Nick Wayne) (with Mother Wayne and Kip Sabian) defeated Hook and Katsuyori Shibata by pinfall	Tag team match	11:50
6	Shelton Benjamin defeated The Beast Mortos by pinfall	AEW Continental Classic Blue League match	8:10
7	Darby Allin defeated Will Ospreay by pinfall	AEW Continental Classic Gold League match	14:45
8	Death Riders (Jon Moxley, Pac, and Wheeler Yuta) (with Claudio Castagnoli and Marina Shafir) defeated "Hangman" Adam Page, Jay White, and Orange Cassidy by pinfall	Trios match	12:05
(c) / – the champion(s) heading into the match; D / – this was a dark match

Rampage (taped December 18, aired December 20)
No.	Results	Stipulations	Times
1	The Don Callis Family (Brian Cage and Konosuke Takeshita) defeated Mark Davis and Powerhouse Hobbs by pinfall	Tag team match	12:27
2	Action Andretti and Lio Rush defeated Myles Hawkins and Goldy by pinfall	Tag team match	1:10
3	Willow Nightingale defeated Harley Cameron by pinfall	Singles match	6:41
4	Brody King defeated Komander by pinfall	AEW Continental Classic Gold League match	14:51
