= Winter Is Coming (2024) =

All Elite Wrestling three-part television special

- Promotional poster for the Dynamite broadcast featuring various AEW wrestlers
- Promotion: All Elite Wrestling
- Date: December 11 and 12, 2024 (aired December 11, 13, and 14, 2024)
- City: Kansas City, Missouri (December 11); St. Louis, Missouri (December 12)
- Venue: T-Mobile Center (Kansas City); Chaifetz Arena (St. Louis)
- Attendance: 3,854 (Dynamite); 3,854 (Rampage); 2,343 (Collision)

Winter Is Coming chronology
← Previous; 2023	Next → 2025

AEW Dynamite special episodes chronology
← Previous; Thanksgiving Eve	Next → Holiday Bash

AEW Rampage special episodes chronology
← Previous; Royal Rampage	Next → Holiday Bash

AEW Collision special episodes chronology
← Previous; Grand Slam	Next → Christmas Collision

The 2024 Winter Is Coming was a three-part professional wrestling television special produced by All Elite Wrestling (AEW). It was the fifth annual Winter Is Coming event and took place on December 11 and 12, 2024, at the T-Mobile Center in Kansas City, Missouri and the Chaifetz Arena in St. Louis, Missouri, respectively, encompassing the broadcasts of Wednesday Night Dynamite, Friday Night Rampage, and Saturday Night Collision. Dynamite aired live on December 11 on TBS, Rampage was taped the same night and aired on tape delay on December 13 on TNT, while Collision was taped on December 12 and aired on tape delay on December 14, also on TNT. All totaled, 16 matches aired over the three shows.

== Production ==
=== Background ===
Winter Is Coming is an annual professional wrestling television special held in December by All Elite Wrestling (AEW) since 2020. The title "Winter Is Coming" is derived from Game of Thrones, a television series from HBO, which is part of Warner Bros. Discovery, which also includes AEW broadcast partners TBS and TNT. On November 16, 2024, it was announced that the fifth Winter Is Coming would be held on December 11, 2024, at the T-Mobile Center in Kansas City, Missouri and air live as Wednesday Night Dynamite on TBS. It was later revealed that like the prior year, the special would also encompass Friday Night Rampage, which was taped on December 11 after Dynamite's live broadcast and aired on tape delay on December 13 on TNT, and Saturday Night Collision, which was taped on December 12 at Chaifetz Arena in St. Louis, Missouri and will air on tape delay on December 14, also on TNT.

=== Storylines ===
Winter Is Coming features professional wrestling matches that involved different wrestlers from pre-existing scripted feuds and storylines. Storylines were produced on AEW's weekly television programs, Dynamite, Rampage, and Collision.

== Results ==
Dynamite (aired live December 11)
No.	Results	Stipulations	Times
1^{D}	Satnam Singh defeated Colt Cabana	Singles match	—
2^{D}	The Dark Order (Alex Reynolds and Evil Uno) defeated Fuego Del Sol and Serpentico	Tag team match	—
3	Death Riders (Jon Moxley and Pac) (with Marina Shafir and Wheeler Yuta) defeated Orange Cassidy and Jay White by disqualification	Tag team match	14:15
4	Will Ospreay defeated Claudio Castagnoli by pinfall	AEW Continental Classic Gold League match	13:25
5	Adam Cole defeated Kyle O'Reilly by pinfall	Dynamite Diamond Semifinal to determine MJF's challenger in the Dynamite Diamond Final for the AEW Dynamite Diamond Ring at Worlds End	10:50
6	Ricochet defeated Brody King by pinfall	AEW Continental Classic Gold League match	12:50
7	Mariah May (c) defeated Mina Shirakawa by pinfall	Singles match for the AEW Women's World Championship	11:10
(c) / – the champion(s) heading into the match; D / – this was a dark match

Rampage (taped December 11, aired December 13)
No.	Results	Stipulations	Times
1	Matt Cardona defeated Bryan Keith (with Chris Jericho) by pinfall	Singles match	10:54
2	Toni Storm defeated Harley Cameron by pinfall	Singles match	7:27
3	Deonna Purrazzo defeated Shazza McKenzie by submission	Singles match	1:24
4	Powerhouse Hobbs and Mark Davis defeated The Don Callis Family (Konosuke Takeshita and Lance Archer) (with Don Callis) by pinfall	Tag team match	12:00

Collision (taped December 12, aired December 14)
No.	Results	Stipulations	Times
1	Willow Nightingale defeated Jamie Hayter by pinfall	International Women's Cup Qualifier	12:04
2	Kazuchika Okada defeated The Beast Mortos by pinfall	AEW Continental Classic Blue League match	12:44
3	Toni Storm defeated Shazza McKenzie by pinfall	Singles match	1:47
4	Lio Rush and Action Andretti defeated Top Flight (Darius Martin and Dante Martin) (with Leila Grey) by pinfall	Tag team match The winning team received a match against Private Party (Isiah Kassidy and Marq Quen) for the AEW World Tag Team Championship	10:46
5	Kris Statlander defeated Tootie Lynn by pinfall	Singles match	1:49
6	The Outrunners (Truth Magnum and Turbo Floyd), Daniel Garcia, Komander, and Orange Cassidy (with Alex Abrahantes) defeated MxM Collection (Mason Madden and Mansoor) and The Premier Athletes (Ari Daivari, Josh Woods, and Tony Nese) (with Mark Sterling) by pinfall	10-man tag team match	8:48
7	Mark Briscoe defeated Kyle Fletcher by pinfall	AEW Continental Classic Blue League match	19:44
