= Dynamite on 34th Street (2025) =

Professional wrestling TV special

- Promotion: All Elite Wrestling
- Date: December 20, 2025 (aired December 24, 2025)
- City: New York City, New York
- Venue: Hammerstein Ballroom
- Attendance: 1,491

AEW Dynamite special episodes chronology
← Previous; Holiday Bash	Next → New Year's Smash

The 2025 Dynamite on 34th Street was the second Dynamite on 34th Street professional wrestling television special produced by All Elite Wrestling (AEW). It took place on December 20, 2025, at the Hammerstein Ballroom in New York City, New York, and aired on tape delay on December 24 as a special Christmas Eve episode of Wednesday Night Dynamite on TBS in the United States.

== Production ==
=== Background ===
AEW Dynamite is the flagship weekly television program of the American professional wrestling company All Elite Wrestling (AEW). On November 18, 2024, AEW filed to trademark "Dynamite on 34th Street". On December 22, 2024, AEW held the first Dynamite on 34th Street special at the Hammerstein Ballroom in New York City, New York and aired it on tape delay on December 25.

On November 17, 2025, AEW announced that they would return to the Hammerstein Ballroom with the 2025 edition of Dynamite on 34th Street on December 20, 2025, which would air on December 24 in addition to the 2025 edition of Christmas Collision the night after. Alongside matches for the 2025 Continental Classic tournament, the event also featured that year's Dynamite Diamond Final for the AEW Dynamite Diamond Ring.

=== Storylines ===
Dynamite on 34th Street featured six professional wrestling matches that involved different wrestlers from pre-existing scripted feuds and storylines. Storylines were produced on AEW's weekly television programs, Dynamite and Collision.

== Results ==
No.	Results	Stipulations	Times
1	Konosuke Takeshita defeated Orange Cassidy	Continental Classic Blue League Match	15:26
2	Mascara Dorada defeated Roderick Strong	Continental Classic Blue League Match	9:20
3	MJF defeated Dustin Waller	Singles match	1:12
4	Bandido defeated Ricochet	Dynamite Diamond Ring 2025 Final Match	12:25
5	Marina Shafir defeated Mina Shirakawa by referee's decision	Singles match	7:29
6	Jack Perry defeated PAC	Continental Classic Gold League Match	14:28
