= AEW Maximum Carnage =

All Elite Wrestling two-part television special

Maximum Carnage
- Promotional poster featuring various AEW wrestlers
- Promotion: All Elite Wrestling
- Date: January 15 and 16, 2025 (aired January 15 and 18, 2025)
- City: Cincinnati, Ohio
- Venue: Andrew J. Brady Music Center
- Attendance: 1,570 (Dynamite); 1,410 (Collision)

Maximum Carnage chronology
← Previous; First	Next → 2026

AEW Dynamite special episodes chronology
← Previous; Fight for the Fallen	Next → Spring BreakThru

AEW Collision special episodes chronology
← Previous; Christmas Collision	Next → Homecoming

Maximum Carnage was a two-part professional wrestling television special produced by All Elite Wrestling (AEW). It took place on January 15 and 16, 2025, at the Andrew J. Brady Music Center in Cincinnati, Ohio, encompassing the broadcasts of Wednesday Night Dynamite and Saturday Night Collision. Dynamite aired live on January 15 on TBS in the United States, while Collision was taped on January 16 and aired on tape delay on January 18 on TNT, also in the United States. Both shows were also simulcast on the streaming service Max.

The opening match of Collision was notable as the in-ring retirement of Christopher Daniels, who was defeated by knockout by "Hangman" Adam Page in a Texas Death Match. Daniels would continue his role both on-screen and backstage as Head of Talent Relations at AEW.

== Production ==
=== Background ===
On December 5, 2024, the American professional wrestling promotion All Elite Wrestling (AEW) filed to trademark "Maximum Carnage". On December 23, the company announced that Maximum Carnage would be a two-part television special, first airing as a special episode of AEW's flagship program, Wednesday Night Dynamite, and then as a special episode of Saturday Night Collision. The event was scheduled to be held on January 15 and 16, 2025, at the Andrew J. Brady Music Center in Cincinnati, Ohio. Dynamite aired live on January 15 on TBS in the United States, while Collision was taped on January 16 and aired on tape delay on January 18 on TNT, also in the United States. Both shows were also simulcast on the streaming service Max.

Collison's opening match marked the in-ring retirement of Christopher Daniels. In an interview with Chris Van Vliet, Daniels described his reasoning going into event. He stated that he "knew my contract as a performer was coming to an end." He described his body was feeling "eh", and he wasn't wrestling much anymore. He rejected Tony Khan's requests to label his match with "Hangman" Adam Page as a retirement match, stating "I also didn't want people to know it was my final match. I want people to be shocked."

=== Storylines ===
Maximum Carnage featured professional wrestling matches that involved different wrestlers from pre-existing scripted feuds and storylines. Storylines were produced on AEW's weekly television programs, Dynamite and Collision.

== Results ==
Dynamite (aired live January 15)
No.	Results	Stipulations	Times
1	Kenny Omega defeated Brian Cage (with Don Callis and Lance Archer) by pinfall	Singles match	12:00
2	The Hurt Syndicate (Bobby Lashley, Shelton Benjamin, and MVP) defeated Mark Briscoe and Private Party (Isiah Kassidy and Marq Quen) by pinfall	Trios match	9:33
3	Hook defeated Christian Cage (with Mother Wayne) by disqualification	Singles match	11:35
4	Toni Storm won by pinning Julia Hart (Note: Order of entrants: Kris Statlander, Jamie Hayter, Megan Bayne, Julia Hart, Willow Nightingale, Toni Storm, and Harley Cameron)	Casino Gauntlet match for a AEW Women's World Championship match at Grand Slam Australia	12:46
5	Jon Moxley (c) (with Claudio Castagnoli, Pac, and Marina Shafir) defeated Powerhouse Hobbs by technical submission	Singles match for the AEW World Championship	13:30
(c) / – the champion(s) heading into the match

Collision (taped January 16, airing January 18)
No.	Results	Stipulations	Times
1	"Hangman" Adam Page defeated Christopher Daniels by knockout	Texas Death match	16:40
2	The Undisputed Kingdom (Adam Cole, Kyle O'Reilly, and Roderick Strong) defeated Shane Taylor Promotions (Carlie Bravo, Capt. Shawn Dean, and Lee Moriarty) (with Shane Taylor) by pinfall	Trios match	6:55
3	Murder Machines (Brian Cage and Lance Archer) defeated Top Flight (Dante Martin and Darius Martin) (with Leila Grey) by pinfall	Tag team match	3:50
4	Kazuchika Okada (c) defeated Tomohiro Ishii by pinfall	Singles match for the AEW Continental Championship	8:15
5	Dustin Rhodes defeated Adam Priest by pinfall	Singles match	2:15
6	Julia Hart defeated Harley Cameron by submission	Singles match	7:25
7	Powerhouse Hobbs, The Outrunners (Truth Magnum and Turbo Floyd), and Rated FTR (Dax Harwood, Cash Wheeler, and Cope) defeated Death Riders (Jon Moxley, Claudio Castagnoli, and Wheeler Yuta) and The Learning Tree (Chris Jericho, Big Bill, and Bryan Keith) (with Marina Shafir) by pinfall	12-man tag team match	17:45
(c) / – the champion(s) heading into the match
