= Worlds End (2026) =

2026 All Elite Wrestling pay-per-view event

- Promotional poster
- Promotion: All Elite Wrestling
- Date: December 19, 2026
- City: Minneapolis, Minnesota
- Venue: Target Center

Pay-per-view chronology
← Previous; Full Gear	Next → Dynasty

Worlds End chronology
← Previous; 2025	Next → —

The 2026 Worlds End is an upcoming professional wrestling pay-per-view (PPV) event produced by All Elite Wrestling (AEW). It will be the fourth annual Worlds End and will take place on December 19, 2026, at the Target Center in Minneapolis, Minnesota.

== Production ==
=== Background ===
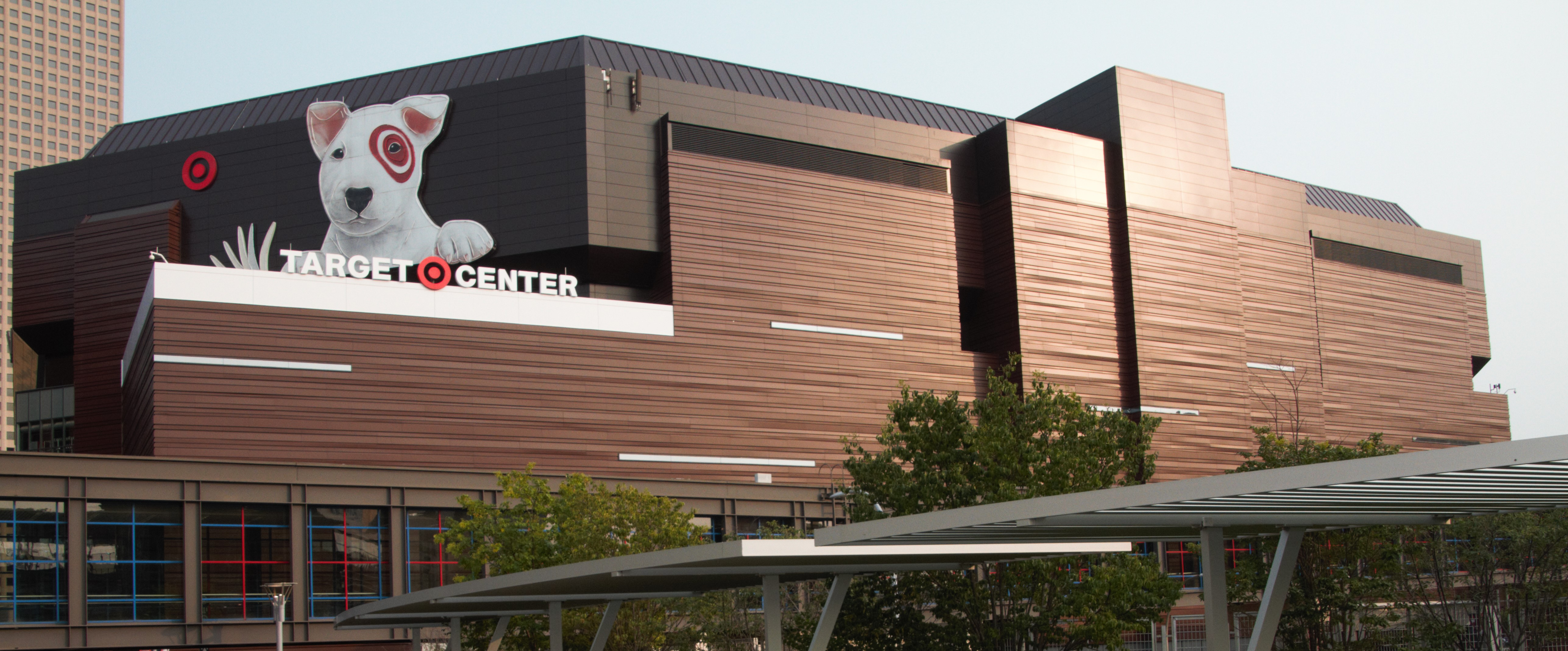
The event will be held at the Target Center in Minneapolis.

Worlds End is an annual professional wrestling pay-per-view (PPV) event produced in late December by All Elite Wrestling (AEW) since 2023. The event notably hosts the finals of the annual Continental Classic (C2) for the AEW Continental Championship. On September 26, 2026, AEW announced that the fourth annual Worlds End would take place on December 19, at the Target Center in Minneapolis. This will be AEW's second PPV event at the venue after Full Gear in 2021 and the first to take place before Christmas. Tickets for Worlds End went on sale on October 5.

=== Storylines ===
Worlds End will feature several professional wrestling matches that involve different wrestlers from pre-existing feuds and storylines. Storylines are produced on AEW's weekly television programs, Dynamite and Collision.

== Matches ==
No.	Matches*	Stipulations
1	Gold League winner vs. Blue League runner-up	Continental Classic Semifinal
2	Blue League winner vs. Gold League runner-up	Continental Classic Semifinal
3	Semifinal #1 winner vs. Semifinal #2 winner	Continental Classic Final for the AEW Continental Championship
*Card subject to change
