= Wrestle Dynasty =

2025 co-promoted professional pay-per-view event

- Promotional poster featuring various NJPW, AEW, CMLL, ROH, and Stardom wrestlers
- Promotion(s): New Japan Pro-Wrestling; All Elite Wrestling; Consejo Mundial de Lucha Libre; Ring of Honor; World Wonder Ring Stardom
- Date: January 5, 2025
- City: Tokyo, Japan
- Venue: Tokyo Dome
- Attendance: 16,300
- Tagline: Two Days to Move the World (Japanese: 世界を動かに日間, Hepburn: Sekai o ugokasu ni kakan)

Pay-per-view chronology
← Previous; NJPW: Wrestle Kingdom 19; AEW: Worlds End; CMLL: Sin Salida; ROH: Final Battle; Stardom; New Year Dream	Next → NJPW: New Year Dash!! AEW: Revolution; CMLL: Homenaje a Dos Leyendas; ROH: Supercard of Honor; Stardom; Supreme Fight

Wrestle Dynasty was a professional wrestling pay-per-view (PPV) event co-produced by the Japanese promotions New Japan Pro-Wrestling (NJPW) and World Wonder Ring Stardom, the American promotions All Elite Wrestling (AEW) and Ring of Honor (ROH), and the Mexican promotion Consejo Mundial de Lucha Libre (CMLL). It took place on January 5, 2025, at the Tokyo Dome in Tokyo, Japan, the night after NJPW's Wrestle Kingdom 19.

Twelve matches were contested at the event, including two on the pre-show. In the event's final match, which was promoted as part of a double main event, Zack Sabre Jr. defeated Ricochet to retain the IWGP World Heavyweight Championship. In the other main event, Kenny Omega defeated Gabe Kidd in what was Omega's first match for over a year due to diverticulitis. In other prominent matches, The Young Bucks (Nicholas Jackson and Matthew Jackson) defeated United Empire (Great-O-Khan and Jeff Cobb) and Los Ingobernables de Japón (Tetsuya Naito and Hiromu Takahashi) to win the vacant IWGP World Tag Team Championship, and Mercedes Moné defeated Mina Shirakawa in a Winner Takes All match for both the NJPW Strong Women's Championship and the RevPro Undisputed British Women's Championship.

== Production ==
Other on-screen personnel
Role:	Name:
English commentators	Walker Stewart
English commentators	Chris Charlton
Japanese commentators	Haruo Murata
Japanese commentators	Miki Motoi
Japanese commentators	Milano Collection AT
Japanese commentators	El Desperado
Japanese commentators	Hiroshi Tanahashi
Ring announcer	Makoto Abe

=== Background ===
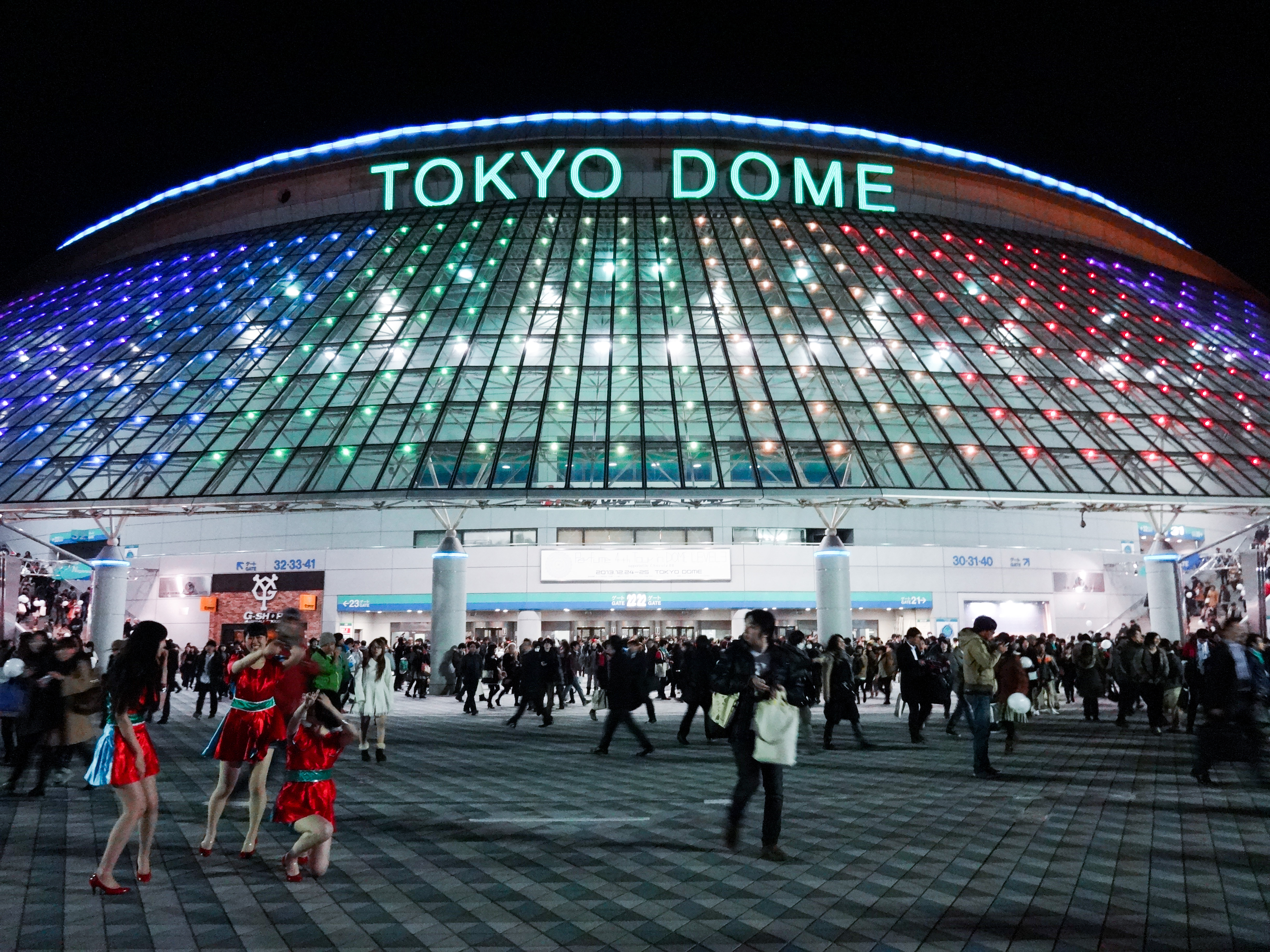
The event was held at the Tokyo Dome in Tokyo, Japan.

Since 1992, the Japanese professional wrestling promotion New Japan Pro-Wrestling (NJPW) has held an annual show on January 4 at the Tokyo Dome, a professional baseball stadium in Tokyo, Japan; since 2007, the event has been known as Wrestle Kingdom, and has since become the largest professional wrestling event in Japan. Between 2019 and 2022, NJPW also held a second Wrestle Kingdom show at the Tokyo Dome on January 5. In 2025, the January 5 Tokyo Dome show will be branded as "Wrestle Dynasty". NJPW also holds the New Year Dash!! event in Tokyo on the day after Wrestle Kingdom; in 2025, New Year Dash!! will be held on January 6, the day after Wrestle Dynasty.

In February 2021, the American professional wrestling promotion All Elite Wrestling (AEW) started a partnership with NJPW. Since then, both AEW and NJPW have had their wrestlers appear at each other's events. The working relationship resulted in the creation of AEW x NJPW: Forbidden Door, an annual co-promoted pay-per-view (PPV) event held in North America. AEW and NJPW also have working partnerships with the Mexican promotion Consejo Mundial de Lucha Libre (CMLL): CMLL and NJPW have had a working relationship since 2009 and have co-produced the Fantastica Mania series of events since 2011; and CMLL and AEW entered into a working relationship in October 2023.

In 2019, NJPW's parent company Bushiroad acquired the joshi promotion World Wonder Ring Stardom (Stardom); Stardom would later become a fully-fledged subsidiary of NJPW in 2024. In 2022, AEW owner Tony Khan acquired Ring of Honor (ROH) from their previous owner, Sinclair Broadcast Group; prior to the acquisition, ROH also had a long working relationship with NJPW, including co-producing the War of the Worlds and Global Wars events in North America and Honor Rising events in Japan.

On August 22, 2020, NJPW planned to hold an event under the name of Wrestle Dynasty at Madison Square Garden in New York City; due to the COVID-19 pandemic, the event was postponed to 2021, and later cancelled. After the 2022 Forbidden Door event, then NJPW President Takami Ohbari expressed interest in the next event being held in Japan; Tony Khan said that he was open to the idea of AEW wrestlers performing in Japan, but said that such an event would not be titled "Forbidden Door". Prior to the 2024 Forbidden Door event, Khan expressed interest in a co-promoted show in Japan, but was non-committal over whether the event would be an iteration of Forbidden Door or a new event entirely.

On June 30, 2024, during Forbidden Door, Wrestle Dynasty was announced for January 5, 2025, in the Tokyo Dome, to be co-produced by AEW, NJPW, CMLL, ROH, and Stardom. Wrestle Dynasty will mark the first AEW PPV event to be held in Japan, the third AEW PPV event held outside North America (following the 2023 and 2024 All In events, which were both held at Wembley Stadium in London, England), and AEW's first event to be held in a professional baseball stadium.

=== Storylines ===
Wrestle Dynasty logo, featuring the logos of all presenting promotions.

Wrestle Dynasty featured professional wrestling matches that were the results of pre-existing feuds and storylines, with results being predetermined by the bookers of the co-producing promotions. Storylines were produced on the weekly programs, Dynamite, Collision, Rampage, Honor Club TV, and Super Viernes; as well as at other AEW, CMLL, NJPW, ROH, and Stardom events.

== Results ==
No.	Results	Stipulations	Times
1^{P}	Momo Watanabe (Stardom) (with Thekla) defeated Willow Nightingale (AEW), Persephone (CMLL), and Athena (ROH) by pinfall	Four-way match for the International Women’s Cup final Winner receives a women's championship match from the participating promotion of their choosing.	11:13
2^{P}	The Sons of Texas (Dustin Rhodes and Sammy Guevara) (c) defeated House of Torture (Sho and Yoshinobu Kanemaru) by pinfall	Tag team match for the ROH World Tag Team Championship	9:27
3	Taiji Ishimori defeated Hechicero, Kosei Fujita, Soberano Jr., Master Wato, Máscara Dorada, Titán, and El Desperado by pinfall	Eight-man Lucha Gauntlet match	16:23
4	Hiroshi Tanahashi vs. Katsuyori Shibata ended in a time limit draw	Grappling Rules exhibition match	5:00
5	Mercedes Moné (Strong) defeated Mina Shirakawa (British) by pinfall	Winner Takes All match for the Strong Women's Championship and the Undisputed British Women's Championship	14:06
6	David Finlay (with Gedo) defeated Brody King by pinfall	Singles match	12:53
7	Shota Umino defeated Claudio Castagnoli by pinfall	Singles match	14:31
8	Konosuke Takeshita (c) (with Don Callis) defeated Tomohiro Ishii by pinfall	Singles match for the NEVER Openweight Championship and the AEW International Championship	13:30
9	The Young Bucks (Matthew Jackson and Nicholas Jackson) defeated United Empire (Great-O-Khan and Jeff Cobb) and Los Ingobernables de Japon (Tetsuya Naito and Hiromu Takahashi) by pinfall	Three-way tag team match for the vacant IWGP Tag Team Championship	13:46
10	Yota Tsuji (c) defeated Jack Perry by pinfall	Singles match for the IWGP Global Heavyweight Championship	13:15
11	Kenny Omega defeated Gabe Kidd (with Clark Connors and Drilla Moloney) by pinfall	Singles match	31:55
12	Zack Sabre Jr. (c) (with Hartley Jackson, Kosei Fujita, Robbie Eagles, and Ryohei Oiwa) defeated Ricochet by submission	Singles match for the IWGP World Heavyweight Championship	20:57
(c) / – the champion(s) heading into the match; P / – the match was broadcast on the pre-show

=== International Women’s Cup bracket ===
Preliminary qualifiers AEW Dynamite: Thanksgiving Eve (November 27); AEW Collision (December 7); Stardom (December 20 and 21)
Jamie Hayter	Pin
Queen Aminata	9:18
Serena Deeb	9:55
Willow Nightingale	Pin
Hanan	–
Saki Kashima	–
Yuna Mizumori	10:16
Momo Watanabe	Pin
Fukigen Death	–
Saya Iida	–
Syuri	Pin
Ranna Yagami	10:31
Tomoka Inaba	Pin
Koguma	–
Rina	–
Waka Tsukiyama	13:39
Hina	15:01
Konami	–
Aya Sakura	–
Suzu Suzuki	Pin

Qualifiers; AEW Collision: Winter Is Coming (December 14); ROH Honor Club TV (December 12); CMLL Super Viernes (December 13); Stardom (December 22)
AEW
Jamie Hayter	12:04
Willow Nightingale	Pin
CMLL
Persephone	Pin
Reyna Isis	12:37
Sanely	–
Zeuxis	–
ROH
Athena	Pin
Billie Starkz	–
Leyla Hirsch	–
Red Velvet	10:20
Stardom
Momo Watanabe	Pin
Syuri	–
Tomoka Inaba	9:41
Suzu Suzuki	–

Final; Wrestle Dynasty (January 5)
Willow Nightingale	–
Persephone	–
Athena	11:13
Momo Watanabe	Pin

== See also ==
- List of All Elite Wrestling pay-per-view events
- List of major NJPW events
- List of Ring of Honor pay-per-view and livestreaming events
- List of major World Wonder Ring Stardom events
