= Dynamite on 34th Street =

All Elite Wrestling television special series

- Promotions: All Elite Wrestling
- First event: 2024

Dynamite on 34th Street is an annual professional wrestling television special produced by the American promotion All Elite Wrestling (AEW) since 2024. The event airs around Christmas and is held in New York City, New York at the Hammerstein Ballroom on 34th Street, broadcast as a special episode of the promotion's flagship weekly television program, Wednesday Night Dynamite. Its name is also a play on the Christmas classic Miracle on 34th Street, a film that also takes place around New York's 34th Street. The special has aired on TBS since 2024 and simulcast on HBO Max since 2025. While most episodes of Dynamite air live, Dynamite on 34th Street is pre-taped due to its holiday scheduling.

== History ==
On November 18, 2024, it was reported that the American professional wrestling promotion All Elite Wrestling (AEW) had filed a trademark for two Christmas-themed events, one of which was Dynamite on 34th Street, the name being a play on the Christmas classic Miracle on 34th Street. On November 19, 2024, AEW announced that they would be holding shows at the Hammerstein Ballroom on 34th Street in New York City, New York for three days with Dynamite on 34th Street being held on the last day of the residency. Dynamite on 34th Street was taped on December 22, 2024, and aired on tape delay on December 25 as a special episode of AEW's flagship weekly television program, Wednesday Night Dynamite. The show was the final night of the 2024 Continental Classic tournament before the Worlds End pay-per-view with Kyle Fletcher vs. Daniel Garcia in a Continental Classic Blue League match being the main event.

On November 17, 2025, AEW announced their return to the Hammerstein Ballroom with the 2025 edition of Dynamite on 34th Street on December 20, 2025, which aired on December 24. In addition to league matches of the 2025 Continental Classic, the event featured that year's Dynamite Diamond Final for the AEW Dynamite Diamond Ring.

== Events ==
| Event # | | Date | City | Venue | Main event | Ref. |
|---|---|---|---|---|---|---|
| 1 | Dynamite on 34th Street (2024) | December 22, 2024 (aired December 25) | New York City, New York | Hammerstein Ballroom | Kyle Fletcher vs. Daniel Garcia in a Blue League match of the Continental Classic | |
| 2 | Dynamite on 34th Street (2025) | December 20, 2025 (aired December 24) | New York City, New York | Hammerstein Ballroom | "Jungle" Jack Perry vs. Pac in a Gold League match of the Continental Classic | |
