= AEW Continental Classic =

Professional wrestling tournament

Continental Classic
- Tournament logo
- Promotion: All Elite Wrestling
- Nickname: C2

Tournament information
- Established: 2023; 3 years ago
- Current winner: Jon Moxley
- Ongoing: 2026
- Prize: AEW Continental Championship
- Editions: 3
- Format: Two-block round-robin tournament
- Participants: 12
Statistics
- First winner: Eddie Kingston
- Oldest winner: Eddie Kingston (42 years, 18 days)
- Youngest winner: Kazuchika Okada (37 years, 50 days)
- Heaviest winner: Eddie Kingston (240 lb (110 kg))
- Lightest winner: Jon Moxley (231 lb (105 kg))

The Continental Classic (C2) is an annual professional wrestling round-robin tournament hosted by the American promotion All Elite Wrestling (AEW). The tournament is held at the end of the calendar year, beginning after November's Full Gear pay-per-view (PPV) event and culminating at the Worlds End PPV in late December. The prize of the tournament is the AEW Continental Championship. The most recent 2025 tournament was won by Jon Moxley.

Tournament matches are held under "Continental Rules", in which matches have a 20-minute time limit, no one is allowed at ringside, and outside interference is strictly prohibited. The incumbent Continental Champion at the beginning of each tournament is automatically entered and defends the title throughout the tournament.

== History ==
On November 11, 2023, the American professional wrestling promotion All Elite Wrestling (AEW) announced a tournament called the Continental Classic (C2). AEW president Tony Khan and AEW wrestler Bryan Danielson announced that the tournament would begin on the November 22, 2023, episode of Dynamite, lasting six weeks over AEW's television shows and concluding at the Worlds End pay-per-view (PPV) event on December 30; Danielson was also announced as its first participant. It was also announced that the winner would become the inaugural AEW Continental Champion, and that the incumbent champion would automatically be entered into subsequent tournaments.

The 2023 tournament was won by reigning ROH World Champion and NJPW Strong Openweight Champion Eddie Kingston, who defeated Jon Moxley in the final. For holding the three championships, he was declared by AEW to be the first American Triple Crown Champion, also referred to as the Continental Crown. After losing the Continental Championship to Kazuchika Okada in March 2024, the Triple Crown was disbanded.

In July 2025 at All In: Texas, reigning Continental Champion Kazuchika Okada defeated Kenny Omega in a Winner Takes All Championship unification match to also win the AEW International Championship, with both titles held and defended together as the AEW Unified Championship; since Okada won as the Continental Champion, the Unified Championship adopted the rules of the Continental Championship. Okada only placed the Continental Championship on the line for the 2025 tournament; after his loss in the tournament final at Worlds End to Jon Moxley, Okada was also forced to relinquish the Unified Championship.

== Overview ==
The AEW Continental Classic Cup displayed during the 2026 tournament.

The AEW Continental Classic is an annual tournament that starts after the promotion's Full Gear PPV event in mid-November and ends at the Worlds End PPV at the end of December. The tournament takes place in a round-robin format, with two blocks of six wrestlers – titled the Blue and Gold Leagues – wrestling each other across AEW's television shows, Dynamite and Collision (and formerly Rampage). The incumbent Continental Champion automatically qualifies for the tournament, (Note: In 2023, Eddie Kingston was given automatic entry as the incumbent ROH World Champion and NJPW Strong Openweight Champion.) with the other 11 participants announced shortly prior to the beginning of the tournament. Matches are held under "Continental Rules": each match has a 20-minute time limit, no other wrestlers are allowed at ringside, and outside interference is strictly prohibited under threat of penalties. The tournament is commonly known as the "C2", in reference to the G1 Climax, a similar annual round-robin tournament hosted by AEW's partner promotion, New Japan Pro-Wrestling.

Similar to most soccer leagues, match winners obtain three points for a win, and drawn matches give one point to each participant. After the round-robin phase, the top two wrestlers in each league qualify for a league final match, with ties broken based on head-to-head record. (Note: In the 2023 tournament, when the Gold League ended with a intractable three-way tie for qualification, the league's final was a three-way match. From 2024 onwards, if a tie for qualification remains intractable, it is broken by a one-game playoff.) In 2023, the finalists in each league faced each other at New Year's Smash prior to the Continental Championship match at Worlds End; from 2024, the format was modified so that league winners face the opposing league's runner-up in the opening matches of Worlds End prior to the championship final later in the night.

== Results ==
Tournament results
Year	Winner		Runner up		Other participants	
2023	B	Eddie Kingston (9)	G	Jon Moxley (12)	Blue	Bryan Danielson (10), Andrade El Idolo (9), Claudio Castagnoli (7), Brody King (6), Daniel Garcia (3)
2023	B	Eddie Kingston (9)	G	Jon Moxley (12)	Gold	Swerve Strickland (12), Jay White (12), Rush (6), Mark Briscoe (3), Jay Lethal (0)
2024	B	Kazuchika Okada (c; 10)	G	Will Ospreay (9)	Blue	Kyle Fletcher (12), Mark Briscoe (9), Daniel Garcia (7), Shelton Benjamin (6), The Beast Mortos (0)
2024	B	Kazuchika Okada (c; 10)	G	Will Ospreay (9)	Gold	Ricochet (10), Claudio Castagnoli (9), Darby Allin (7), Brody King (6), Komander (3), ~~Juice Robinson~~
2025	B	Jon Moxley (9)	G	Kazuchika Okada (c; 9)	Blue	Konosuke Takeshita (13), Claudio Castagnoli (7), Orange Cassidy (6), Máscara Dorada (6), Roderick Strong (3)
2025	B	Jon Moxley (9)	G	Kazuchika Okada (c; 9)	Gold	Kyle Fletcher (9), Kevin Knight (7), Pac (7), "Jungle" Jack Perry (6), "Speedball" Mike Bailey (6), ~~Darby Allin~~
2026	To be determined				Blue	Jay White, "Hangman" Adam Page, Ricochet, Daniel Garcia, Brody King, Bandido
2026	To be determined				Gold	Jon Moxley (c), Kevin Knight, Orange Cassidy, Nick Wayne, "Speedball" Mike Bailey, Tommaso Ciampa
(c) – the Continental Champion at the beginning of the tournament Numbers in brackets indicate how many points were won by each participant Italics indicate losing league finalists ~~Struckthrough text~~ indicates participants replaced due to injury

== See also ==
- List of All Elite Wrestling tournaments
