= Christmas Collision =

All Elite Wrestling television special

- Promotional poster featuring various AEW wrestlers
- Promotion: All Elite Wrestling
- Date: December 21, 2024
- City: New York City, New York
- Venue: Hammerstein Ballroom
- Attendance: 1,491

AEW Collision special episodes chronology
← Previous; Winter Is Coming	Next → Maximum Carnage

Christmas Collision was a professional wrestling television special produced by All Elite Wrestling (AEW). It took place on December 21, 2024, at the Hammerstein Ballroom in New York City, New York, and aired live as a special Christmas episode of Saturday Night Collision on TNT in the United States.

== Production ==
=== Background ===
AEW Collision is a weekly television program by the American professional wrestling company All Elite Wrestling (AEW). On November 18, 2024, AEW filed to trademark "Christmas Collision". On November 28, as part of AEW's two-week span of holiday-themed programming, the company announced that "Christmas Collision" would be a special Christmas episode of Saturday Night Collision and would take place on December 21, 2024, from the Hammerstein Ballroom in New York City, New York, and aired live on TNT in the United States.

=== Storylines ===
Christmas Collision featured five professional wrestling matches that involved different wrestlers from pre-existing scripted feuds and storylines. Storylines were produced on AEW's weekly television programs, Dynamite, Rampage, and Collision.

== Results ==
No.	Results	Stipulations	Times
1	Ricochet defeated Will Ospreay by pinfall	AEW Continental Classic Gold League match	14:20
2	Kris Statlander defeated Penelope Ford by pinfall	Singles match	9:00
3	Daniel Garcia defeated Shelton Benjamin by pinfall	AEW Continental Classic Blue League match	12:15
4	Mark Briscoe defeated The Beast Mortos by pinfall	AEW Continental Classic Blue League match	11:40
5	Claudio Castagnoli defeated Darby Allin by pinfall	AEW Continental Classic Gold League match	11:15
