= 2024 Continental Classic =

Professional wrestling tournament

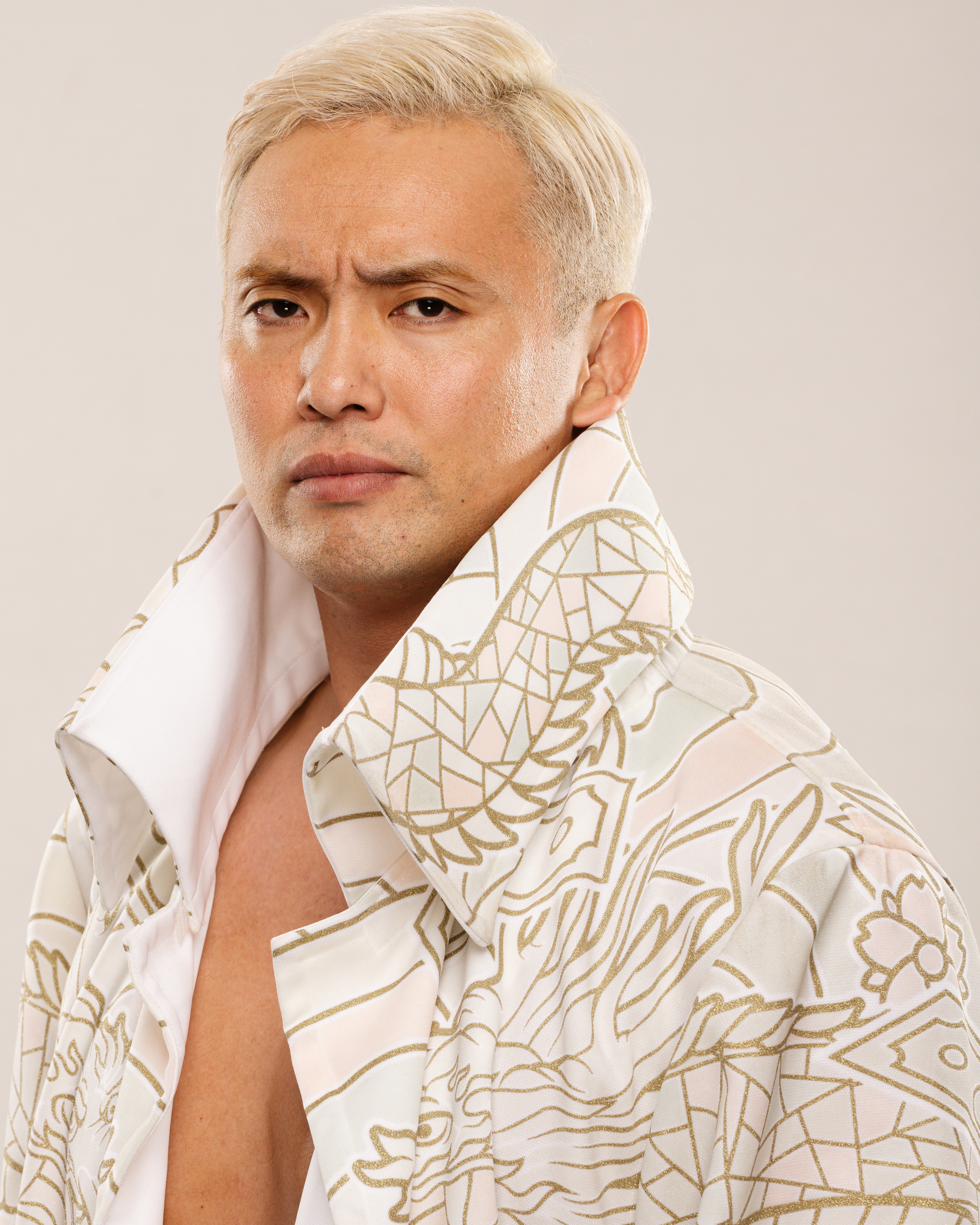
- 2024 Continental Classic winner Kazuchika Okada

Tournament information
- Sport: Professional wrestling
- Location: United States
- Dates: November 27, 2024–December 28, 2024
- Tournament format: Two-block round-robin tournament
- Host: All Elite Wrestling
- Venue: Various arenas (see matches)
- Participants: 13 (Note: Juice Robinson sustained an injury in his first match against Will Ospreay; he was replaced for the remainder of the tournament by Komander.)

Final positions
- Champion: Kazuchika Okada
- Runner-up: Will Ospreay

The 2024 Continental Classic (C2) was a professional wrestling round-robin tournament hosted by the American promotion All Elite Wrestling (AEW). The second annual edition of the AEW Continental Classic began on the Thanksgiving Eve episode of Wednesday Night Dynamite on November 27, 2024, and culminated at the Worlds End pay-per-view (PPV) event on December 28, 2024. Tournament matches were held under "Continental Rules", which feature a 20-minute time limit with no one allowed at ringside and outside interference strictly prohibited. The prize of the tournament was the AEW Continental Championship. Incumbent champion Kazuchika Okada was automatically entered into the tournament and won to retain the title.

== Overview ==
Established in 2023, the Continental Classic (C2) is an annual professional wrestling tournament hosted by All Elite Wrestling (AEW) that starts after the promotion's Full Gear pay-per-view (PPV) event in mid-November and ends at the Worlds End PPV at the end of December. The tournament takes place in a round-robin format, with two blocks of six wrestlers – titled the Blue and Gold Leagues – wrestling each other across AEW's television shows, Dynamite, Rampage, and Collision.

Matches are held under "Continental Rules": each match has 20-minute time limit, no other wrestlers are allowed at ringside, and outside interference is strictly prohibited under threat of penalty. Similar to most soccer leagues, match winners obtain three points for a win, and drawn matches give one point to each participant. After the round-robin phase, the top two wrestlers in each league qualify for a league final match, with ties broken based on head-to-head record. The winner of each league final match then face each other for the AEW Continental Championship at Worlds End. For 2024, the format for the league finals was changed so that block winners would face the runner-up from the opposite block in the opening matches of Worlds End.

As the incumbent Continental Champion, Kazuchika Okada was awarded automatic entry into the tournament. Daniel Garcia announced his entry at the press conference after Full Gear, and the other 10 participants were announced in a "Selection Sunday" presentation prior to the beginning of the tournament: Okada, Garcia, Shelton Benjamin, Mark Briscoe, Kyle Fletcher, and The Beast Mortos in the Blue League, and Darby Allin, Claudio Castagnoli, Brody King, Will Ospreay, Ricochet, and Juice Robinson in the Gold League. After Robinson sustained a suspected broken foot in his first tournament match against Ospreay, he was withdrawn from the tournament and replaced with Komander.

== Matches ==
Legend
Blue League match
Gold League match
Semifinal match
Championship final match

Tournament matches
Dates	Show	Venue	Matches		Time
November 27	Thanksgiving Eve Dynamite	Wintrust Arena; Chicago, Illinois	B	Shelton Benjamin defeated Mark Briscoe by pinfall	11:44
November 27	Thanksgiving Eve Dynamite	Wintrust Arena; Chicago, Illinois	G	Claudio Castagnoli defeated Ricochet by pinfall	13:01
November 27	Thanksgiving Eve Dynamite	Wintrust Arena; Chicago, Illinois	G	Brody King defeated Darby Allin by pinfall	9:35
November 27	Collision (aired November 30)	Wintrust Arena; Chicago, Illinois	G	Will Ospreay defeated Juice Robinson by pinfall	12:34
November 27	Collision (aired November 30)	Wintrust Arena; Chicago, Illinois	B	Kyle Fletcher defeated The Beast Mortos by pinfall	9:52
November 27	Collision (aired November 30)	Wintrust Arena; Chicago, Illinois	B	Daniel Garcia vs. Kazuchika Okada went to a time-limit draw	20:00
December 4	Dynamite	Fishers Event Center; Fishers, Indiana	B	Kyle Fletcher defeated Shelton Benjamin by pinfall	15:48
December 4	Dynamite	Fishers Event Center; Fishers, Indiana	G	Claudio Castagnoli defeated Brody King by pinfall	14:17
December 4	Rampage (aired December 6)	Fishers Event Center; Fishers, Indiana	B	Kazuchika Okada defeated Mark Briscoe by pinfall	13:26
December 4	Rampage (aired December 6)	Fishers Event Center; Fishers, Indiana	B	Daniel Garcia defeated The Beast Mortos by pinfall	10:25
December 4	Rampage (aired December 6)	Fishers Event Center; Fishers, Indiana	G	Ricochet defeated Komander by pinfall	12:28
December 7	Collision	Greater Columbus Convention Center; GalaxyCon; Columbus, Ohio	G	Darby Allin defeated Komander by pinfall	13:11
December 7	Collision	Greater Columbus Convention Center; GalaxyCon; Columbus, Ohio	B	Kyle Fletcher defeated Kazuchika Okada by pinfall	16:57
December 7	Collision	Greater Columbus Convention Center; GalaxyCon; Columbus, Ohio	B	Mark Briscoe defeated Daniel Garcia by pinfall	16:22
December 11	Dynamite: Winter Is Coming	T-Mobile Center; Kansas City, Missouri	G	Will Ospreay defeated Claudio Castagnoli by pinfall	13:26
December 11	Dynamite: Winter Is Coming	T-Mobile Center; Kansas City, Missouri	G	Ricochet defeated Brody King by pinfall	12:46
December 12	Collision: Winter Is Coming (aired December 14)	Chaifetz Arena; St Louis, Missouri	B	Kazuchika Okada defeated The Beast Mortos by pinfall	12:44
December 12	Collision: Winter Is Coming (aired December 14)	Chaifetz Arena; St Louis, Missouri	B	Mark Briscoe defeated Kyle Fletcher by pinfall	19:44
December 18	Dynamite: Holiday Bash	Entertainment and Sports Arena; Washington, D.C.	B	Shelton Benjamin defeated The Beast Mortos by pinfall	8:47
December 18	Dynamite: Holiday Bash	Entertainment and Sports Arena; Washington, D.C.	G	Darby Allin defeated Will Ospreay by pinfall	14:38
December 18	Rampage: Holiday Bash (aired December 20)	Entertainment and Sports Arena; Washington, D.C.	G	Brody King defeated Komander by pinfall	14:51
December 21	Christmas Collision	Hammerstein Ballroom; New York City, New York	G	Ricochet defeated Will Ospreay by pinfall	14:27
December 21	Christmas Collision	Hammerstein Ballroom; New York City, New York	B	Daniel Garcia defeated Shelton Benjamin by pinfall	12:16
December 21	Christmas Collision	Hammerstein Ballroom; New York City, New York	B	Mark Briscoe defeated The Beast Mortos by pinfall	11:38
December 21	Christmas Collision	Hammerstein Ballroom; New York City, New York	G	Claudio Castagnoli defeated Darby Allin by pinfall	11:16
December 22	Dynamite on 34th Street (aired December 25)	Hammerstein Ballroom; New York City, New York	G	Will Ospreay defeated Brody King by pinfall	15:30
December 22	Dynamite on 34th Street (aired December 25)	Hammerstein Ballroom; New York City, New York	G	Darby Allin vs. Ricochet went to a time-limit draw	20:00
December 22	Dynamite on 34th Street (aired December 25)	Hammerstein Ballroom; New York City, New York	G	Komander defeated Claudio Castagnoli by pinfall	7:37
December 22	Dynamite on 34th Street (aired December 25)	Hammerstein Ballroom; New York City, New York	B	Kazuchika Okada defeated Shelton Benjamin by pinfall	12:37
December 22	Dynamite on 34th Street (aired December 25)	Hammerstein Ballroom; New York City, New York	B	Kyle Fletcher defeated Daniel Garcia by pinfall	15:06
December 28	Worlds End	Addition Financial Arena; Orlando, Florida	SF	Will Ospreay defeated Kyle Fletcher by pinfall	16:21
December 28	Worlds End	Addition Financial Arena; Orlando, Florida	SF	Kazuchika Okada defeated Ricochet by pinfall	12:55
December 28	Worlds End	Addition Financial Arena; Orlando, Florida	CF	Kazuchika Okada defeated Will Ospreay by pinfall	19:12

== Leagues ==
Legend
Qualified to semifinal

Participants
Blue League		Gold League	
Kyle Fletcher	12	Ricochet	10
Kazuchika Okada (c)	10	Will Ospreay (Note: Ospreay advanced to the semifinals due to his head-to-head victory over Castagnoli.)	9
Mark Briscoe	9	Claudio Castagnoli	9
Daniel Garcia	7	Darby Allin	7
Shelton Benjamin	6	Brody King	6
The Beast Mortos	0	Komander	3
(c) – the incumbent champion at the beginning of the tournament

Tournament overview
Blue League	Benjamin	Briscoe	Fletcher	Garcia	Mortos	Okada
Benjamin	—N/a	Benjamin (11:44)	Fletcher (15:48)	Garcia (12:16)	Benjamin (8:47)	Okada (12:37)
Briscoe	Benjamin (11:44)	—N/a	Briscoe (19:44)	Briscoe (16:22)	Briscoe (11:38)	Okada (13:26)
Fletcher	Fletcher (15:48)	Briscoe (19:44)	—N/a	Fletcher (15:06)	Fletcher (9:52)	Fletcher (16:57)
Garcia	Garcia (12:16)	Briscoe (16:22)	Fletcher (15:06)	—N/a	Garcia (10:25)	Draw (20:00)
Mortos	Benjamin (8:47)	Briscoe (11:38)	Fletcher (9:52)	Garcia (10:25)	—N/a	Okada (12:44)
Okada	Okada (12:37)	Okada (13:26)	Fletcher (16:57)	Draw (20:00)	Okada (12:44)	—N/a
Gold League	Allin	Castagnoli	King	Komander	Ospreay	Ricochet
Allin	—N/a	Castagnoli (11:16)	King (9:35)	Allin (13:11)	Allin (14:38)	Draw (20:00)
Castagnoli	Castagnoli (11:16)	—N/a	Castagnoli (14:17)	Komander (7:37)	Ospreay (13:26)	Castagnoli (13:01)
King	King (9:35)	Castagnoli (14:17)	—N/a	King (14:51)	Ospreay (15:30)	Ricochet (12:46)
Komander	Allin (13:11)	Komander (7:37)	King (14:51)	—N/a	Ospreay (12:34)	Ricochet (12:28)
Ospreay	Allin (14:38)	Ospreay (13:26)	Ospreay (15:30)	Ospreay (12:34)	—N/a	Ricochet (14:27)
Ricochet	Draw (20:00)	Castagnoli (13:01)	Ricochet (12:46)	Ricochet (12:28)	Ricochet (14:27)	—N/a

Semifinals; Worlds End (December 28)
B1	Kyle Fletcher	16:21
G2	Will Ospreay	Pin
G1	Ricochet	12:55
B2	Kazuchika Okada (c)	Pin

Championship Final; Worlds End (December 28)
G2	Will Ospreay	19:12
B2	Kazuchika Okada (c)	Pin

== See also ==
- List of All Elite Wrestling tournaments
