= AEW Worlds End =

All Elite Wrestling pay-per-view event series

- AEW Worlds End logo
- Promotions: All Elite Wrestling
- First event: 2023
- Signature matches: Continental Classic semifinals and final

AEW Worlds End is a professional wrestling pay-per-view (PPV) event produced by All Elite Wrestling (AEW). Established in 2023, it is held annually in late December, on the weekend before New Year's Eve. The event also hosts the Continental Classic (C2) tournament final.

== History ==
On October 25, 2023, it was reported that the American professional wrestling promotion All Elite Wrestling (AEW) had filed to trademark the name "Worlds End". Later that same night on Dynamite, AEW announced that it would hold a pay-per-view (PPV) event titled Worlds End on Saturday, December 30, 2023, at the Nassau Veterans Memorial Coliseum in Uniondale, New York on Long Island, marking the company's first PPV to be held in the state of New York. The event hosted the finals of the inaugural Continental Classic tournament. On April 11, 2024, AEW announced that the second Worlds End event would take place on December 28, 2024, at the Addition Financial Arena near Orlando, Florida, thus establishing Worlds End as an annual PPV and host for the annual Continental Classic.

== Continental Classic ==
The Continental Classic (C2) is an annual tournament that starts after AEW's Full Gear PPV event in mid-November and ends at Worlds End at the end of December. The tournament takes place in a round-robin format, with two blocks of six wrestlers – titled the Blue and Gold Leagues – wrestling each other across AEW's television shows, Dynamite and Collision, and formerly Rampage. The tournament prize is the AEW Continental Championship. The incumbent Continental Champion automatically qualifies for the tournament, (Note: In 2023, Eddie Kingston was given automatic entry as the incumbent ROH World Champion and NJPW Strong Openweight Champion.) with the other 11 participants announced shortly prior to the beginning of the tournament. Matches are held under "Continental Rules": each match has a 20-minute time limit, no other wrestlers are allowed at ringside, and outside interference is strictly prohibited under threat of penalties.

== Events ==
#	Event	Date	City	Venue	Main event	C2 winner	Ref.
1	Worlds End (2023)	December 30, 2023	Uniondale, New York	Nassau Veterans Memorial Coliseum	MJF (c) vs. Samoa Joe for the AEW World Championship	Eddie Kingston	
2	Worlds End (2024)	December 28, 2024	Orlando, Florida (Note: The venue is on the main campus of the University of Central Florida, which has an Orlando mailing address but is physically located in unincorporated Orange County.)	Addition Financial Arena	Jon Moxley (c) vs. Orange Cassidy vs. "Hangman" Adam Page vs. Jay White for the AEW World Championship	Kazuchika Okada (c)	
3	Worlds End (2025)	December 27, 2025	Hoffman Estates, Illinois	Now Arena	Samoa Joe (c) vs. Swerve Strickland vs. "Hangman" Adam Page vs. MJF for the AEW World Championship	Jon Moxley	
4	Worlds End (2026)	December 19, 2026	Minneapolis, Minnesota	Target Center	TBA	TBD	
(c) – refers to the champion(s) heading into the match

== See also ==
- List of All Elite Wrestling pay-per-view events
