= The Outrunners =

Professional wrestling tag team

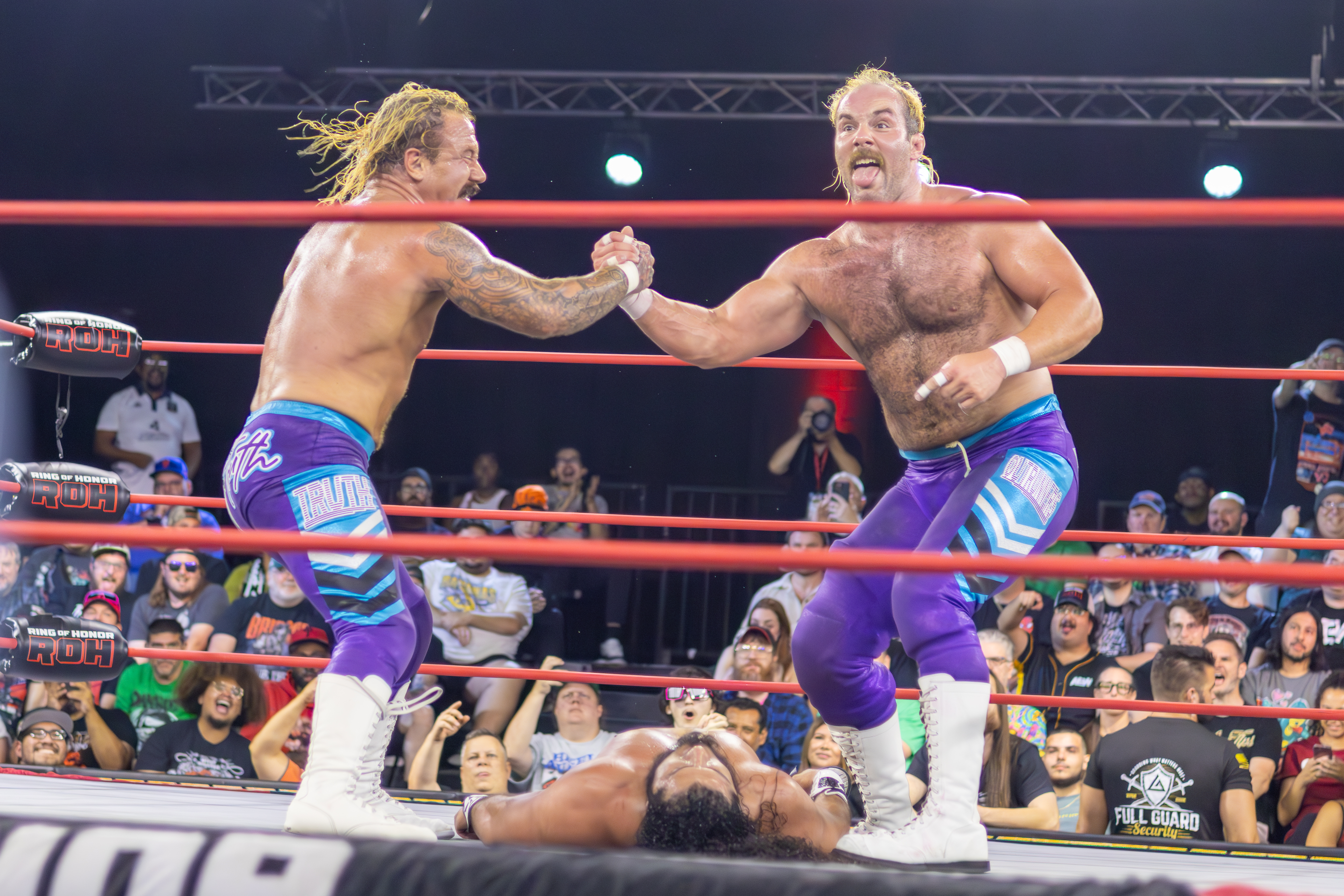
- Truth Magnum (left) and Turbo Floyd (right)

Tag team
- Members: Truth Magnum; Turbo Floyd
- Name: The Outrunners
- Hometown: Truth Magnum: Seattle, Washington; Turbo Floyd: Rensselaer, Indiana
- Billed from: Miami Beach, Florida
- Former members: Lazer Linda; Erica Leigh
- Debut: April 3, 2021
- Years active: 2021–present

The Outrunners are an American professional wrestling tag team consisting of Truth Magnum and Turbo Floyd. They are signed to All Elite Wrestling (AEW), and also wrestle for its sister promotion Ring of Honor (ROH), where they are former one-time ROH World Six-Man Tag Team Champions. The team debuted in April 2021 and wrestled for the National Wrestling Alliance (NWA) as well as several regional promotions on the independent circuit, such as Ohio Valley Wrestling (OVW). The team's gimmick is that they are presented as a throwback to 1980s wrestlers.

== History ==
=== All Elite Wrestling / Ring of Honor (2021–present) ===
The Outrunners made their All Elite Wrestling (AEW) debut on September 8, 2021, on AEW Dark: Elevation, losing to The Butcher and the Blade.

Starting in the fall of 2024, The Outrunners became regulars on AEW television, mainly appearing on Collision, where they formed an alliance with FTR. This alliance was officially named "FTRunners." This stemmed from the positive crowd reaction that The Outrunners received on the September 11th episode of AEW Dynamite that led to the signing of the duo. On November 23 at Full Gear, The Outrunners participated in a four-way tag team match for the AEW World Tag Team Championships, but were unsuccessful. On March 9, 2025, at Revolution, The Outrunners unsuccessfully challenged The Hurt Syndicate for the tag titles. During the summer of 2025, their alliance with FTR officially ended after the latter team turned heel at AEW Dynasty by attacking Adam Copeland, though the Outrunners were not involved in the post-match segment. This led to a tag team match between the two teams on the All In (2025) Zero Hour, where FTR were victorious. On May 15, 2026, at Supercard of Honor, The Outrunners teamed with Dalton Castle to defeat Shane Taylor Promotions to win the ROH World Six-Man Tag Team Championship On August 21 at Death Before Dishonor, the Outrunners and Castle lost their titles to The Lethal Twist (Jay Lethal, Blake Christian, and Lee Johnson), ending their reign at 97 days.

== Professional wrestling style and persona ==
The team's gimmick is that they are presented as 1980s throwback wrestlers, including wearing gear and using moves in the style of that era, and filming vignettes using a VHS video camera. Their entrances are also presented in a VHS-esque aesthetic. Their popularity made them one of AEW's top merchandise sellers in August 2024. Their marketing success in merchandise continued through November 2024, including them being the third top merchandise sellers in September, second top sellers in October, and fifth top sellers in November. The duo accomplished this despite only having one match on Dynamite and one match on Pay-Per-View from August to November 2024.

== Championships and accomplishments ==
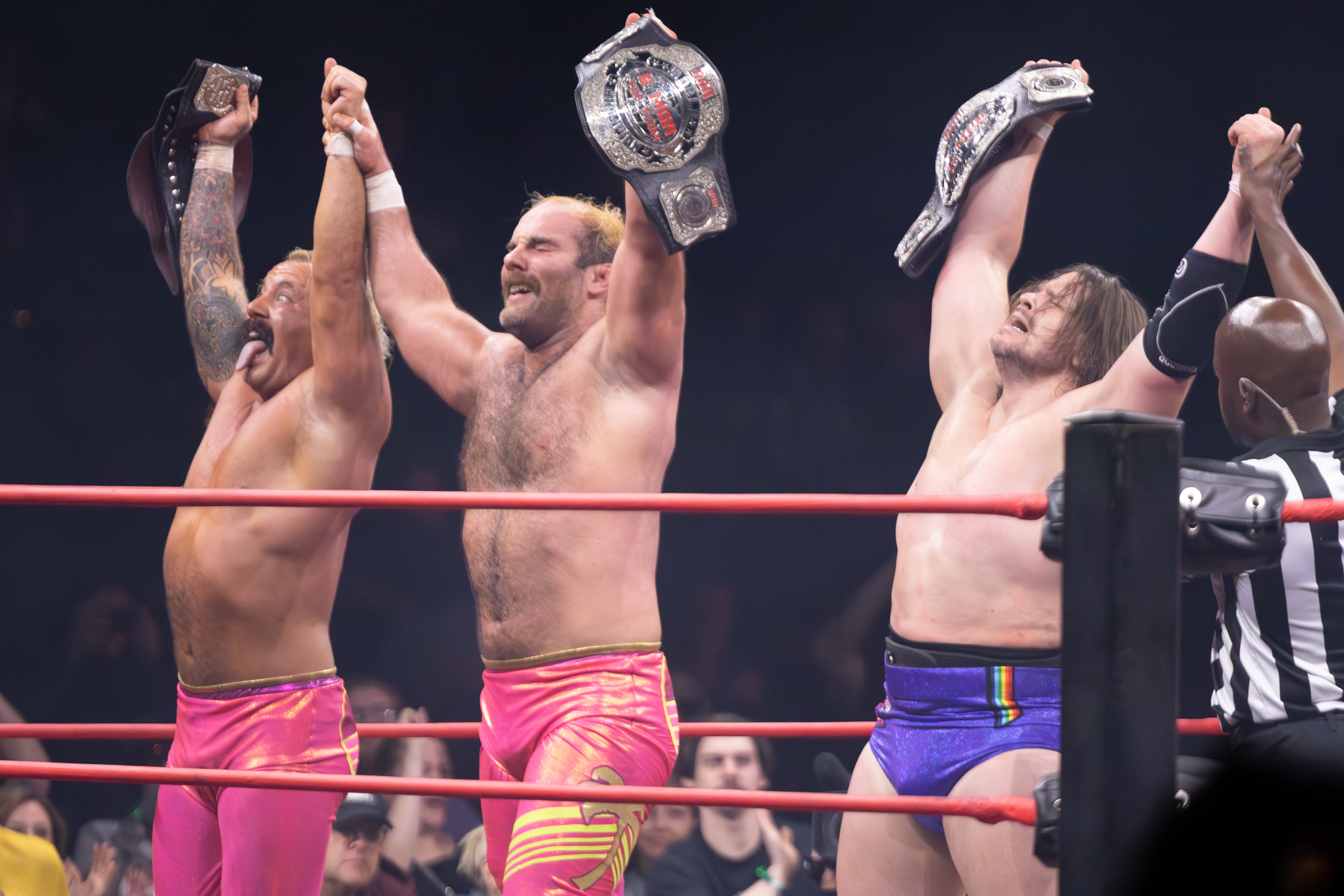
The Outrunners as two thirds of the ROH World Six-Man Tag Team Champions alongside Dalton Castle at Supercard of Honor 2026

- Ohio Valley Wrestling
  - OVW Southern Tag Team Championship (2 times)
- Ring of Honor
  - ROH World Six-Man Tag Team Championship (1 time) – with Dalton Castle
- WrestlePro
  - WrestlePro Tag Team Championship (1 time)
