= Brody King =

American professional wrestler

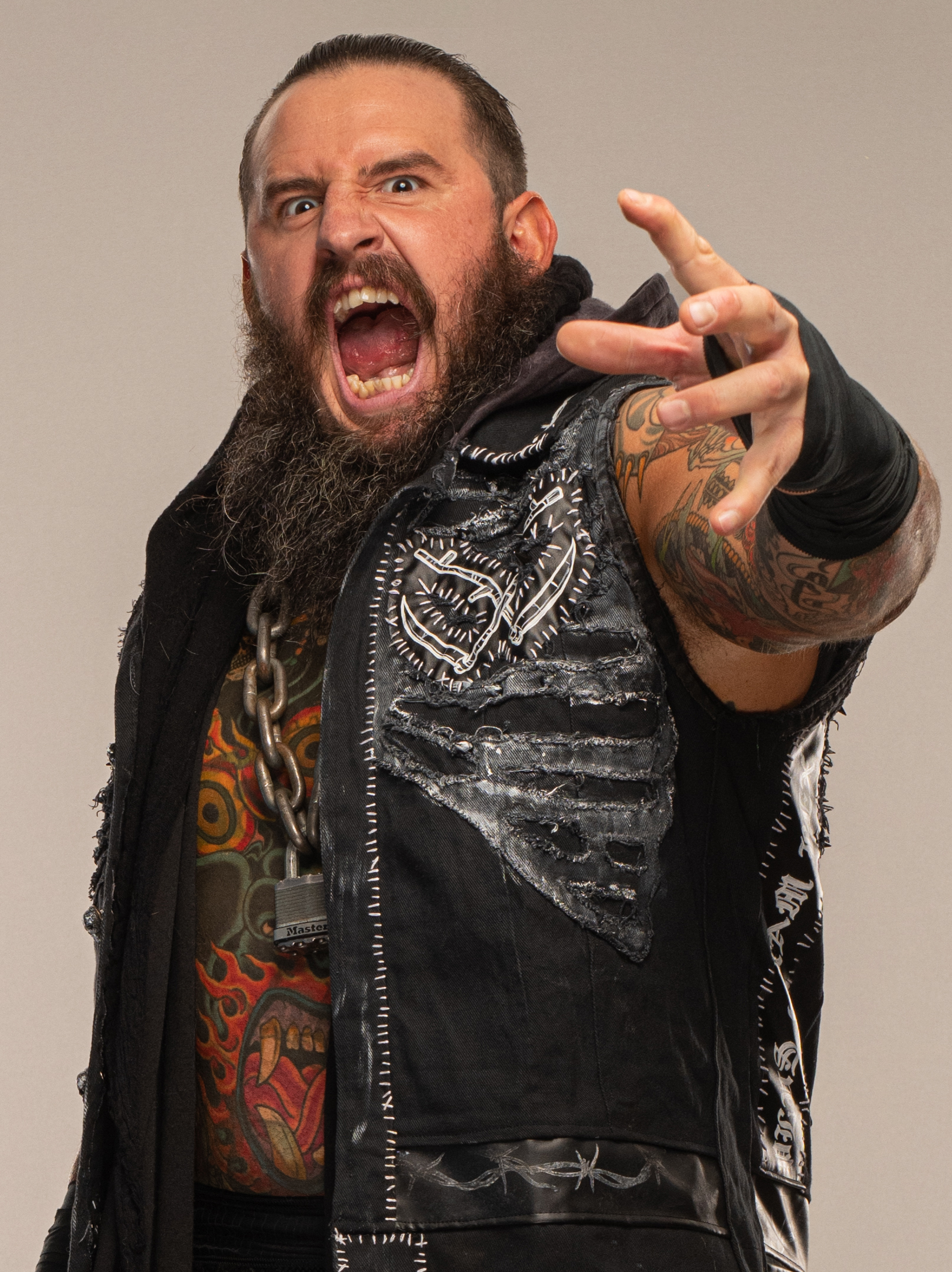
- King in 2022

Personal information
- Born: Nathan Troy Blauvelt; March 17, 1987 (age 39) Van Nuys, California, U.S.
- Children: 2

Professional wrestling career
- Ring name: Brody King
- Billed height: 6 ft 6 in (198 cm)
- Billed weight: 290 lb (132 kg)
- Billed from: Van Nuys, California
- Trained by: Joey Kaos; Santino Bros Wrestling Academy; Rocky Romero
- Debut: July 31, 2015

Nathan Troy Blauvelt (born March 17, 1987), better known by his ring name Brody King, is an American professional wrestler. He is signed to All Elite Wrestling (AEW), where he is one-half of Brodido with Bandido. He is a former three-time AEW World Trios Champion. He is also former one-time AEW World Tag Team Champion.

King is a former triple champion across three promotions; he has held the ROH World Six-Man Tag Team Championship with PCO and Marty Scurll, the ROH World Tag Team Championship and NWA World Tag Team Championship with PCO, and the World Series Wrestling Tag Team Championship with Scurll. King and PCO also won the 2019 ROH Tag Wars tournament and the 2019 Crockett Cup.

Outside of wrestling, he is the lead vocalist of the hardcore band God's Hate and has appeared in the sketch comedy series I Think You Should Leave with Tim Robinson.

== Early life ==
Nathan Troy Blauvelt was born in Van Nuys, California, on March 17, 1987. Before beginning to train as a professional wrestler, he worked in the car park of the Kia Forum.

== Professional wrestling career ==
=== Early career (2015–2017) ===
Blauvelt was trained by the Santinos Bros Academy in Bell Gardens, California, and debuted in 2015. He began to work under the ring name Brody King as a tribute to both Bruiser Brody and Brodie Lee. In 2016, he participated in the All Pro Wrestling' Young Lions Cup, winning the tournament.

=== Major League Wrestling (2017–2018) ===
King made his debut for Major League Wrestling (MLW) at their Never Say Never show on December 12, 2017, losing to Montel Vontavious Porter (MVP). Three months later, he would be eliminated in the first round of the MLW World Heavyweight Championship tournament by Shane Strickland. Then he would participate in the 40-man Battle Riot match, where he would be eliminated. On September 6, 2018, King wrestled his first match against PCO in MLW. The match resulted in a brawl and a double disqualification after around five minutes. His final match for MLW was on the Christmas 2018 edition of MLW Fusion, a taped match from their November tapings, where he lost a no-disqualification match to PCO ending their feud.

=== Independent circuit (2018–2019) ===
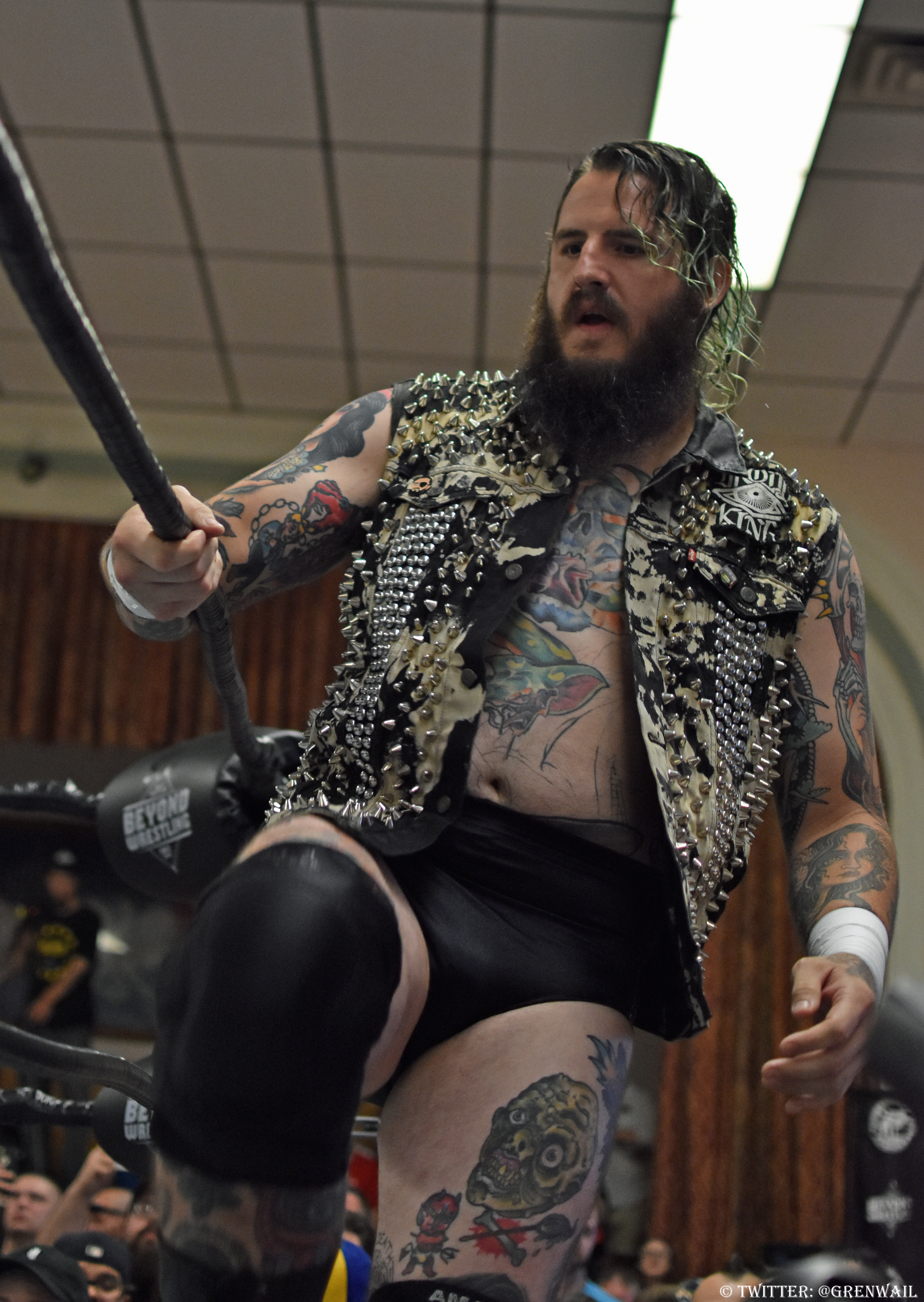
King in July 2018

In 2018, he made his debut for Pro Wrestling Guerilla (PWG) at Neon Knights, losing to Adam Brooks. At Time Is A Flat Circle he defeated Douglas James, Eli Everfly and Jake Atlas in a Fatal-4-Way match. He received a title shot against then-champion Walter at Threemendous V which he lost, but his performance was highly praised. He participated in the 2018 Battle of Los Angeles tournament where he defeated PCO in the first round, but was defeated by Trevor Lee in the second round. At their following event he lost to Timothy Thatcher. Brody King wrestled next for PWG at their January 18, 2019, show Hand of Doom. He defeated Jungle Boy at the event.

On August 31, 2018, at All American Wrestling's AAW Defining Moment 2018 King won the AAW Heavyweight Championship from A. C. H.. He would successfully defend the title against Pentagon Jr. and Eddie Kingston before losing the title to Sami Callihan on December 29, 2018. On November 16 and 17 King appeared on two Game Changer Wrestling (GCW) events. The first night he defeated Hardcore Holly and the second night he lost a GCW Heavyweight Championship match against Nick Gage. In November 2018, King allied with Marty Scurll during a World Series Wrestling's tour, forming a tag team known as Villain Enterprises. They would win the WSW Tag Team Championship during that same tour. His last match of 2018 would be for Suburban Fight Pro against Darby Allin.

=== National Wrestling Alliance (2019) ===
Along with PCO, King participated in the 2019 Crockett Cup tournament. King and PCO defeated Royce Isaacs and Thomas Laitmer in the finals to win the cup and the vacant NWA World Tag Team Championship.

=== Ring of Honor (2018–2021) ===
On December 1, 2018, King signed an exclusive deal with Ring of Honor. He debuted for ROH at the December 15 tapings, forming Villain Enterprises with Scurll and PCO. King and PCO would then go on to win the 2019 ROH Tag Wars Tournament, and on March 15, they defeated The Briscoe Brothers in a Las Vegas street fight to win the ROH World Tag Team Championship at the ROH 17th Anniversary Show. The following night, King, PCO, and Scurll defeated The Kingdom for the ROH World Six-Man Tag Team Championship during the Ring of Honor Wrestling tapings. This made King a double champion in ROH within a 24 hour span. PCO and King would lose the ROH Tag Team Titles to Guerrillas of Destiny in a Fatal 4 Way match also involving Los Ingobernables de Japón (EVIL and Sanada) and The Briscoes at G1 Supercard. On January 11, 2020, Villain Enterprises would lose the Six Man Titles to MexiSquad (Bandido, Flamita, and Rey Horus). Villain Enterprises would quietly disband after this due to the COVID-19 pandemic and Scurll's departure from Ring of Honor after allegations during the Speaking Out movement as King and PCO both began focusing on singles competition. At Final Battle, King received a ROH World Championship match against Rush but was defeated after interference from La Bestia del Ring who struck him with a steel chair. On March 26, 2021, at ROH 19th Anniversary Show, King would unveil a new faction called Violence Unlimited consisting of Tony Deppen, Chris Dickinson, and Homicide as they attacked La Faccion Ingobernable.

=== New Japan Pro-Wrestling (2019–2022, 2025) ===
King's contract with ROH opened the door for him to make his debut for New Japan Pro-Wrestling (NJPW). His debut match happened on January 30, 2019, in a tag team match with Scurll against Killer Elite Squad at NJPW's The New Beginning in USA event. On February 2, he wrestled on the final day of the tour, going against ROH Television Champion Jeff Cobb. His next appearance for them would be in Japan, during the Best of the Super Juniors 2019 tour. He would team with Scurll to defeat Taiji Ishimori and Gedo.

On January 5, 2025 at Wrestle Dynasty, King was defeated by David Finlay.

=== All Elite Wrestling (2022–present) ===
==== House of Black / Hounds of Hell (2022–2025) ====
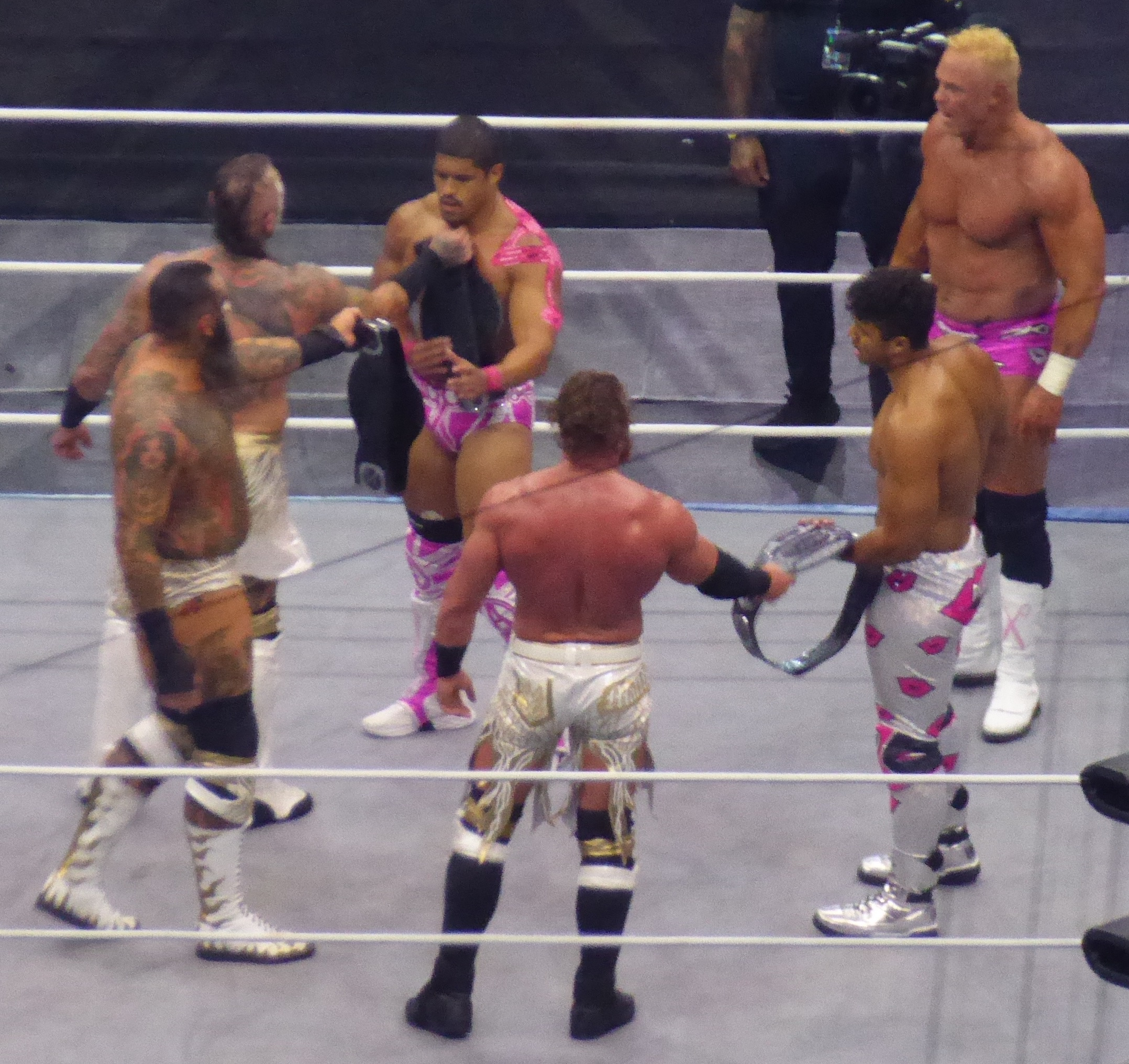
King (left) surrendering the AEW World Trios Championship in August 2023.

On the January 12, 2022, episode of AEW Dynamite, King made his All Elite Wrestling debut, aligning himself with Malakai Black by attacking The Varsity Blonds (Brian Pillman Jr. and Griff Garrison) and Penta El Zero Miedo, forming a tag team called the Kings of the Black Throne, which later evolved into the House of Black. At Revolution's buy-in show, the stable (joined by Buddy Matthews) would then win in a trios match against Death Triangle (Pac and Penta Oscuro) and Erick Redbeard. King had begun feuding with Darby Allin, with King losing a Coffin match against Allin on 10 August. This culminated in a Six-man tag team match at All Out on September 4 where Darby Allin, Sting, and Miro defeated House of Black.

At Revolution on March 5, 2023, The House of Black defeated The Elite (Kenny Omega, Matt Jackson, and Nick Jackson) to become the AEW World Trios Championship. They lost the titles to The Acclaimed and Billy Gunn at All In in August 2023. King was a participant in the inaugural Continental Classic, where was in the Blue block and finished with 6 points, but failed to advance to the playoff stage.

On the June 15, 2024 episode of AEW Collision, the House of Black won a #1 contenders' match for The Patriarchy's AEW World Trios Championships. After the match, Patriarchy leader Christian Cage appeared on the titantron and revealed that they had attacked Matthews with a con-chair-to, turning the entire House of Black stable face for the first time. On August 25 at All In, the House of Black participated in the ladder match for the AEW World Trios Championships, but failed to win. On November 23 at Full Gear, Kings of the Black Throne participated in a four-way tag team match for the AEW World Tag Team Championships, but failed to win On November 24, King was announced as a participant in the 2024 Continental Classic, where he was placed in the Gold league. King finished the tournament with 6 points, but once again failed to advance to the playoff stage. In January 2025, Malakai Black left the stable and was renamed "Hounds of Hell", but the group would go on an indefinite hiatus due to an injury to Buddy Matthews.

==== Brodido (2025–present) ====
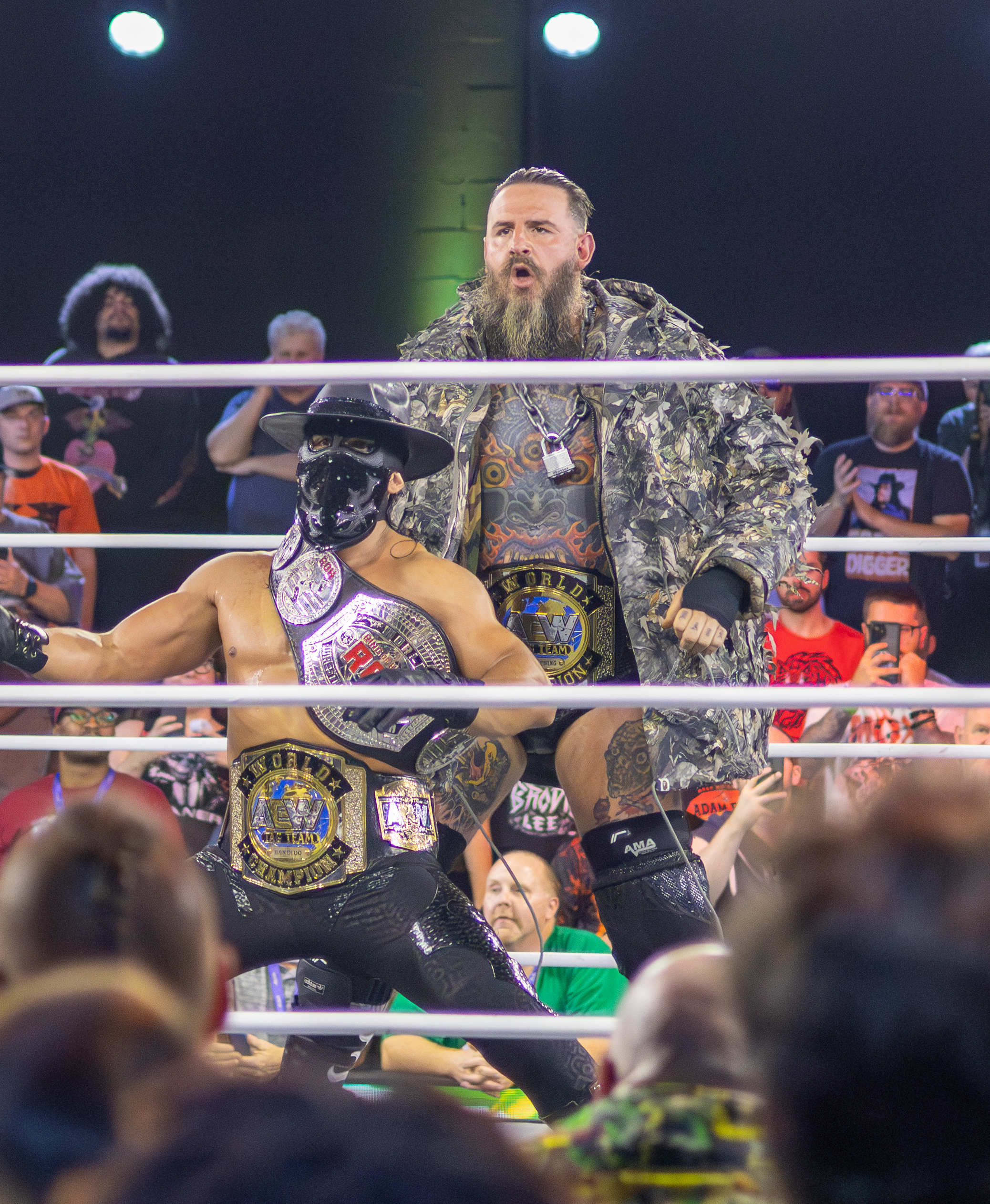
Brodido as the AEW World Tag Team Champions in September 2025

In July 2025, King formed a tag team with Bandido, known as "Brodido" and the team would enter the tag on to enter the AEW World Tag Team Championship Eliminator Tournament, defeating GOA (Bishop Kaun and Toa Liona) in the first round, The Young Bucks (Matt Jackson and Nick Jackson) in the semi-finals, and wrestled FTR (Cash Wheeler and Dax Harwood) to a time-limit draw in the grand finals. Brodido would go on to defeat The Hurt Syndicate (Bobby Lashley and Shelton Benjamin) and FTR (Cash Wheeler and Dax Harwood) to win the AEW World Tag Team Championship at Forbidden Door on August 24. On September 20 at All Out, Brodido successfully defended their titles in a four-way Ladder match, involving The Young Bucks, Don Callis Family (Hechicero and Josh Alexander), and JetSpeed (Kevin Knight and "Speedball" Mike Bailey). On October 18 at WrestleDream, Brodido successfully defended their titles against Kazuchika Okada and Konosuke Takeshita of the Don Callis Family. At Full Gear on November 22, Brodido lost their titles to FTR, ending their reign at 90 days .

On the February 4, 2026 episode of Dynamite, King defeated the regining AEW World Champion MJF in a championship eliminator match and earned a title opportunity at Grand Slam Australia on February 14, but failed to win the title at the event. On the April 29 episode of Dynamite, King once again unsuccessfully challenged for the AEW World Championship, this time against Darby Allin. In May to June, King competed in the Owen Hart Cup, defeating Claudio Castagnoli in the quarterfinal on the May 27 episode of Dynamite before being eliminated by Swerve Strickland in the semifinal on June 10. at Dynamite: Summer Blockbuster. On August 5 at Grand Slam Mexico, Brodido teamed with Adam Page to defeat The Demand (Ricochet, Bishop Kaun, and Toa Liona) to win the AEW World Trios Championship, but lost their titles 25 days later at All In on August 30 in a Trios Roulette Royale to Swerve Strickland and The New Level (Kofi and Austin Creed). They failed to regain the titles from Strickland and the New Level at All Out on September 26, but defeated them at WrestleDream on October 17 in a two out of three falls match 2-1 to begin their second reign. They lost the titles back to Strckland and New Level in a Texas Death match at Full Gear on November 14, ending their second reign at 28 days.

=== Consejo Mundial de Lucha Libre (2025) ===
King made his Consejo Mundial de Lucha Libre (CMLL) debut on the September 12 episode of Viernes Espectacular, where Brodido successfully defended their AEW World Tag Team Championship against Galeón Fantasma ("Phantom Galleon"; Difunto and Zandokan Jr.).

== Other work ==
=== Music ===
King is the lead vocalist of the hardcore punk band God's Hate. Having long been involved in the Los Angeles hardcore scene, King founded the band alongside guitarist, drummer and backing vocalist Colin Young of Twitching Tongues, at the same time as King began wrestling. The pair then recruited fellow Twitching Tongues members Cayle Sain (drums) and Leopold Orozco (bass) as well as Anthonie Gonzalez of Constrict (guitar). This lineup recorded their debut EP Divine Injustice, which was released in 2014 through Closed Casket Activities. The following year, Orozco and Gonzalez swapped roles and the band released their second EP Father Inferior. The band's debut album Mass Murder was then released in 2016. This was followed by a period of inactivity as King focused on his wrestling career. During this time, various lineup changes took place within the band as they recorded tracks for a subsequent album. In 2021, the band's hiatus ended, now featuring King, Colin Young and Gonzalez alongside Martin Stewart of Terror on guitar, Alec Faber of Twitching Tongues on bass and Taylor Young of Nails and Twitching Tongues on guitar. That same year, they released their second album God's Hate. In July 2025 the band announced another hiatus, stating on their Instagram: "The job is finished... For now." King and Colin Young would later appear on The Acacia Strain's album You Are Safe from God Here, each performing vocals on the song "The Machine That Bleeds."

=== Acting ===
King had a role in the 2020 short film Heel, written by and starring fellow wrestler Ryan Nemeth. In 2021, he played a crazed professional wrestler called Mike "The Rock" Davis in an episode of the Netflix sketch comedy series I Think You Should Leave with Tim Robinson.

=== Politics ===
On June 18, 2025, King wore an "Abolish ICE" shirt before a match in Mexico City. King wore the shirt "as a show of support for the protestors in his home region rallying against the Trump administration's deportation policies and tactics". After the match, he sold "Abolish ICE" t-shirts, with all proceeds, totalling over $27,000, donated to the Local Hearts Foundation. In January 2026, he partnered with comic book artist Daniel Warren Johnson to release merchandise to raise money for the Minnesota Rights Action Committee, which as of February 2026 raised $59,000. In February, the fans began to say "Fuck ICE" during King's matches. The incident occurred within weeks of the deaths of Minneapolis residents Renee Good and Alex Pretti at the hands of ICE agents. Writing for The Atlantic, Jeremy Gordon attributed King's willingness to express his views openly being facilitated in part by AEW's reputation as a promotion that places fewer restrictions on what its performers can say compared to rivals such as WWE, whose executives maintain close ties to the Trump administration.

== Personal life ==
Blauvelt has a son named Dante and a daughter named Tallulah. He follows a straight edge lifestyle.

== Championships and accomplishments ==
King is a three-time AEW World Trios Champion

- AAW Wrestling
  - AAW Heavyweight Championship (1 time)
- All Elite Wrestling
  - AEW World Tag Team Championship (1 time) – with Bandido
  - AEW World Trios Championship (3 times) – with Malakai Black and Buddy Matthews (1), and Adam Page and Bandido (2)
  - Royal Rampage (2022)
- All Pro Wrestling
  - Young Lions Cup (2016)
- National Wrestling Alliance
  - NWA World Tag Team Championship (1 time) – with PCO
  - Crockett Cup (2019) – with PCO
- Oddity Wrestling Alliance
  - OWA Tag Team Championships (1 time) – with Tyler Bateman
- Pacific Coast Wrestling/PCW ULTRA
  - PCW ULTRA Tag Team Championship (1 time, final) – with The Almighty Sheik and Jacob Fatu
- Pro Wrestling Guerrilla
  - PWG World Tag Team Championship (1 time, final) – with Malakai Black
- Pro Wrestling Illustrated
  - Ranked No. 63 of the top 500 singles wrestlers in the PWI 500 in 2026
- Ring of Honor
  - ROH World Six Man Tag Team Championship (1 time) – with Marty Scurll and PCO
  - ROH World Tag Team Championship (1 time) – with PCO
  - Tag Wars (2019) – with PCO
  - ROH Year-End Award (1 time)
    - Faction of the Year (2019) – with Villain Enterprises
- Santino Bros. Wrestling
  - SBW Championship (1 time)
  - SBW Championship #1 Contenders Tournament (2017)
- SoCal Uncensored
  - Southern California Rookie of the Year (2016)
  - Southern California Wrestler of the Year (2018)
- World Series Wrestling
  - WSW Tag Team Championship (1 time) – with Marty Scurll
