= List of All Elite Wrestling special events =

Most AEW special events have occurred as special episodes of the weekly shows, Dynamite and Collision, and the former Rampage.

This is a list of All Elite Wrestling (AEW) special events, which primarily includes television specials, such as special episodes of the promotion's weekly television programs, Wednesday Night Dynamite and Saturday Collision, as well as the former Friday Night Rampage along with livestreamed events and individual television specials. On April 9, 2021, AEW began holding special non-televised shows beginning with The House Always Wins.

== Specials ==
=== Key ===
Show key
Color	Note
	Show aired as an episode of Dynamite
	Show aired as an episode of Rampage
	Show aired as an episode of Collision
	Show aired as a Battle of the Belts special
	Show aired as an episode of Dark
	Show aired separately to AEW's weekly series
	Show aired by a different promotion
	Non-televised show

=== 2019 ===
Event	Date	Location	Venue	Main event	Notes	Ref
Fyter Fest	June 29	Daytona Beach, Florida	Ocean Center	Jon Moxley vs. Joey Janela in an unsanctioned match	(Note: Held in conjunction with the Community Effort Orlando eSports tournament.) (Note: Aired in the United States via B/R Live and internationally on pay-per-view.)	
Fight for the Fallen	July 13	Jacksonville, Florida	Daily's Place	The Young Bucks (Matt Jackson and Nick Jackson) vs. The Brotherhood (Cody and Dustin Rhodes)		
Thanksgiving Eve	November 27	Hoffman Estates, Illinois	Sears Center Arena	Chris Jericho (c) vs. Scorpio Sky for the AEW World Championship		
(c) – refers to the champion(s) heading into the match

=== 2020 ===
Event	Date	Location	Venue	Main event	Notes	Ref
Homecoming	January 1	Jacksonville, Florida	Daily's Place	The Elite (Kenny Omega, Matt Jackson, and Nick Jackson) vs. Death Triangle (Pac, Pentagón Jr., and Rey Fénix)		
Dynamite Anniversary	January 8	Southaven, Mississippi	Landers Center	Jurassic Express (Jungle Boy, Luchasaurus, and Marko Stunt) vs. Best Friends (Chuck Taylor, Trent Beretta, and Orange Cassidy)	(Note: Commemorating the January 1, 2019, anniversary of All Elite Wrestling.)	
Bash at the Beach	January 15	Coral Gables, Florida	Watsco Center	Pac vs. Darby Allin		
Bash at the Beach	January 21 (aired January 22)	Miami, Florida to Nassau, Bahamas	Norwegian Pearl	Jon Moxley vs. Pac to determine the number one contender for the AEW World Championship	(Note: Held in conjunction with Chris Jericho's Rock 'N' Wrestling Rager at Sea.)	
Fyter Fest	July 1	Jacksonville, Florida	Daily's Place	Kenny Omega and Adam Page (c) vs. Best Friends (Chuck Taylor and Trent) for the AEW World Tag Team Championship		
Fyter Fest	July 2 (aired July 8)	Jacksonville, Florida	Daily's Place	Chris Jericho vs. Orange Cassidy		
Fight for the Fallen	July 15	Jacksonville, Florida	Daily's Place	Jon Moxley (c) vs. Brian Cage for the AEW World Championship		
Tag-Team Appreciation Night	August 12	Jacksonville, Florida	Daily's Place	Orange Cassidy vs. Chris Jericho in a $7,000 obligation match		
Late Night Dynamite	September 10 (aired September 22)	Jacksonville, Florida	Daily's Place	Shawn Spears vs. Matt Sydal	(Note: A special one-hour episode of Dynamite, not recognised in the official episode count.)	
Chris Jericho's 30th Anniversary Celebration	October 7	Jacksonville, Florida	Daily's Place	The Inner Circle (Chris Jericho and Jake Hager) vs. Chaos Theory (Luther and Serpentico)		
Dynamite Anniversary	October 14	Jacksonville, Florida	Daily's Place	Jon Moxley (c) vs. Lance Archer in a no disqualification match for the AEW World Championship	(Note: Commemorating the October 2, 2019, anniversary of the debut episode of Dynamite.)	
Thanksgiving Eve	November 19 (aired November 25)	Jacksonville, Florida	Daily's Place	The Butcher and the Blade (The Butcher and The Blade) vs. Death Triangle (Pac and Rey Fénix)		
Winter Is Coming	December 2	Jacksonville, Florida	Daily's Place	Jon Moxley (c) vs. Kenny Omega for the AEW World Championship		
Holiday Bash	December 17 (aired December 23)	Jacksonville, Florida	Daily's Place	The Young Bucks (Matt Jackson and Nick Jackson) (c) vs. The Acclaimed (Anthony Bowens and Max Caster) for the AEW World Tag Team Championship		
Brodie Lee Celebration of Life	December 30	Jacksonville, Florida	Daily's Place	Cody Rhodes, Orange Cassidy, and Preston "10" Vance vs. Team Taz (Brian Cage, Ricky Starks, and Powerhouse Hobbs)		
(c) – refers to the champion(s) heading into the match

=== 2021 ===
Event	Date	Location	Venue	Main event	Notes	Refs
New Year's Smash	January 6	Jacksonville, Florida	Daily's Place	Kenny Omega (c) vs. Rey Fénix for the AEW World Championship		
New Year's Smash	January 7 (aired January 13)	Jacksonville, Florida	Daily's Place	Darby Allin (c) vs. Brian Cage for the AEW TNT Championship		
Beach Break	February 3	Jacksonville, Florida	Daily's Place	Kenny Omega and The Good Brothers (Doc Gallows and Karl Anderson) vs. Jon Moxley and Death Triangle (Pac and Rey Fénix)		
The Crossroads	March 3	Jacksonville, Florida	Daily's Place	"Hangman" Adam Page and John Silver vs. Matt Hardy and Marq Quen		
St. Patrick's Day Slam	March 11 (aired March 17)	Jacksonville, Florida	Daily's Place	Thunder Rosa vs. Dr. Britt Baker, D.M.D. in a Lights Out match		
The House Always Wins	April 9	Jacksonville, Florida	Daily's Place	Darby Allin (c) vs. The Butcher for the AEW TNT Championship		
Blood & Guts	May 5	Jacksonville, Florida	Daily's Place	The Pinnacle (MJF, Wardlow, Shawn Spears, Cash Wheeler, and Dax Harwood) vs. The Inner Circle (Chris Jericho, Jake Hager, Sammy Guevara, Santana, and Ortiz) in a Blood and Guts match		
Road Rager	July 7	Miami, Florida	James L. Knight Center	The Young Bucks (Matt Jackson and Nick Jackson) (c) vs. Eddie Kingston and Penta El Zero Miedo for the AEW World Tag Team Championship		
Fyter Fest	July 14	Cedar Park, Texas	H-E-B Center at Cedar Park	Darby Allin vs. Ethan Page in a coffin match		
Fyter Fest	July 21	Garland, Texas	Curtis Culwell Center	Jon Moxley (c) vs. Lance Archer in a Texas Death match for the IWGP United States Heavyweight Championship		
Fight for the Fallen	July 28	Charlotte, North Carolina	Bojangles Coliseum	Chris Jericho vs. Nick Gage		
Homecoming	August 4	Jacksonville, Florida	Daily's Place	Cody Rhodes vs. Malakai Black		
The First Dance	August 20	Chicago, Illinois	United Center	Jon Moxley vs. Daniel Garcia		
Grand Slam	September 22	Queens, New York	Arthur Ashe Stadium	Dr. Britt Baker, D.M.D. (c) vs. Ruby Soho for the AEW Women's World Championship		
Grand Slam	September 22 (aired September 24)	Queens, New York	Arthur Ashe Stadium	Jon Moxley and Eddie Kingston vs. Suzuki-gun (Minoru Suzuki and Lance Archer)		
Dynamite Anniversary	October 6	Philadelphia, Pennsylvania	Liacouras Center	"Hangman" Adam Page vs. Andrade El Idolo vs. Jon Moxley vs. Lance Archer vs. Matt Hardy vs. Orange Cassidy vs. Pac in a Casino Ladder match to determine the number one contender for the AEW World Championship		
Thanksgiving Eve	November 24	Chicago, Illinois	Wintrust Arena	FTR (Cash Wheeler and Dax Harwood), Andrade El Idolo, and Malakai Black vs. Cody Rhodes and Death Triangle (Penta El Zero Miedo, Rey Fénix, and Pac)		
Black Friday	November 24 (aired November 26)	Chicago, Illinois	Wintrust Arena	Eddie Kingston vs. Daniel Garcia		
Winter Is Coming	December 15	Garland, Texas	Curtis Culwell Center	MJF vs. Dante Martin for the AEW Dynamite Diamond Ring		
Holiday Bash	December 22	Greensboro, North Carolina	Greensboro Coliseum	CM Punk, Sting, and Darby Allin vs. The Pinnacle (MJF, Cash Wheeler, and Dax Harwood)		
Holiday Bash	December 22 (aired December 25)	Greensboro, North Carolina	Greensboro Coliseum	Sammy Guevara (c) vs. Cody Rhodes for the AEW TNT Championship		
New Year's Smash	December 29	Jacksonville, Florida	Daily's Place	Adam Cole and reDRagon (Bobby Fish and Kyle O'Reilly) vs. Best Friends (Chuck Taylor, Trent Beretta, and Orange Cassidy)		
New Year's Smash	December 29 (aired December 31)	Jacksonville, Florida	Daily's Place	Cody Rhodes (c) vs Ethan Page for the AEW TNT Championship		
(c) – refers to the champion(s) heading into the match						

=== 2022 ===
Event	Date	Location	Venue	Main event	Notes	Ref
Battle of the Belts I	January 8	Charlotte, North Carolina	Bojangles Coliseum	Dr. Britt Baker, D.M.D. (c) vs. Riho for the AEW Women's World Championship		
Beach Break	January 26	Cleveland, Ohio	Wolstein Center	Adam Cole vs. Orange Cassidy in a Lights Out match		
Beach Break	January 26 (aired January 28)	Cleveland, Ohio	Wolstein Center	Jurassic Express (Jungle Boy and Luchasaurus) (c) vs. Private Party (Isiah Kassidy and Marq Quen) for the AEW World Tag Team Championship		
Revolution Fan Fest	March 5	Orlando, Florida	Addition Financial Arena	The Dark Order (Alex Reynolds and John Silver) vs. The Factory (Aaron Solo and Nick Comoroto)		
St. Patrick's Day Slam	March 16	San Antonio, Texas	Freeman Coliseum	Dr. Britt Baker, D.M.D. (c) vs. Thunder Rosa for the AEW Women's World Championship		
Battle of the Belts II	April 15 (aired April 16)	Garland, Texas	Curtis Culwell Center	Thunder Rosa (c) vs. Nyla Rose for the AEW Women's World Championship		
Wild Card Wednesday	May 18	Houston, Texas	Fertitta Center	Adam Cole vs. Jeff Hardy in an Owen Hart Foundation Men's Tournament semi-final match		
Dynamite Anniversary	May 25	Paradise, Nevada	Michelob Ultra Arena	Samoa Joe vs. Kyle O'Reilly in an Owen Hart Foundation Men's Tournament semi-final match	(Note: Commemorating the May 25, 2019, anniversary of AEW's first event, Double or Nothing.)	
Road Rager	June 15	St. Louis, Missouri	Chaifetz Arena	Jurassic Express (Jungle Boy and Luchasaurus) (c) vs. The Young Bucks (Matt Jackson and Nick Jackson) in a Ladder match for the AEW World Tag Team Championship		
Road Rager	June 15 (aired June 17)	St. Louis, Missouri	Chaifetz Arena	Darby Allin vs. Bobby Fish		
Blood & Guts	June 29	Detroit, Michigan	Little Caesars Arena	Eddie Kingston, Santana, Ortiz, and The Blackpool Combat Club (Jon Moxley, Wheeler Yuta, and Claudio Castagnoli) vs. The Jericho Appreciation Society (Chris Jericho, Jake Hager, Sammy Guevara, Daniel Garcia, Matt Menard, and Angelo Parker) in a Blood and Guts match		
Royal Rampage	June 29 (aired July 1)	Detroit, Michigan	Little Caesars Arena	Toni Storm vs. Nyla Rose		
Fyter Fest	July 13	Savannah, Georgia	Enmarket Arena	The Young Bucks (Matt Jackson and Nick Jackson) (c) vs. Team Taz (Ricky Starks and Powerhouse Hobbs) vs. Swerve in Our Glory (Swerve Strickland and Keith Lee) for the AEW World Tag Team Championship		
Fyter Fest	July 13 (aired July 15)	Savannah, Georgia	Enmarket Arena	The Lucha Brothers (Penta Oscuro and Rey Fénix) vs. Private Party (Isiah Kassidy and Marq Quen)		
Fyter Fest	July 20	Duluth, Georgia	Gas South Arena	Eddie Kingston vs. "The Painmaker" Chris Jericho in a Barbed Wire Everywhere Deathmatch; The rest of the Jericho Appreciation Society were suspended above the ring in a shark cage.		
Fyter Fest	July 20 (aired July 22)	Duluth, Georgia	Gas South Arena	Jay Lethal vs. Christopher Daniels		
Battle of the Belts III	August 5 (aired August 6)	Grand Rapids, Michigan	Van Andel Arena	Claudio Castagnoli (c) vs. Konosuke Takeshita for the ROH World Championship		
Quake by the Lake	August 10	Minneapolis, Minnesota	Target Center	Jon Moxley (c) vs. Chris Jericho for the interim AEW World Championship		
Quake by the Lake	August 10 (aired August 12)	Minneapolis, Minnesota	Target Center	Orange Cassidy vs. Ari Daivari		
House of the Dragon	August 17	Charleston, West Virginia	Charleston Coliseum	The Elite (Kenny Omega, Matt Jackson, and Nick Jackson) vs. La Faccion Ingobernable (Andrade El Idolo, Dragon Lee, and Rush) in an AEW World Trios Championship Tournament first-round match	(Note: Aired in promotion of HBO's House of the Dragon.)	
Fight Forever @ Tokyo Game Show	September 17	Chiba, Japan	Makuhari Messe	Konosuke Takeshita and Yuka Sakazaki vs. Christopher Daniels and Ryo Mizunami	(Note: Held in conjunction with the Tokyo Game Show, to promote AEW Fight Forever.)	
Fight Forever @ Tokyo Game Show	September 18	Chiba, Japan	Makuhari Messe	Hagane Shinnou vs. Michael Nakazawa	(Note: Held in conjunction with the Tokyo Game Show, to promote AEW Fight Forever.)	
Grand Slam	September 21	Queens, New York	Arthur Ashe Stadium	Jon Moxley vs. Bryan Danielson for the vacant AEW World Championship		
Grand Slam	September 21 (aired September 23)	Queens, New York	Arthur Ashe Stadium	Ricky Starks vs. Powerhouse Hobbs in a Lights Out match		
Dynamite Anniversary	October 5	Washington, D.C.	Entertainment & Sports Arena	The Jericho Appreciation Society (Chris Jericho and Sammy Guevara) vs. Bryan Danielson and Daniel Garcia		
Battle of the Belts IV	October 7	Washington, D.C.	Entertainment & Sports Arena	FTR (Cash Wheeler and Dax Harwood) (c) vs Gates of Agony (Toa Liona and Kaun) for the ROH World Tag Team Championship		
Title Tuesday	October 18	Cincinnati, Ohio	Heritage Bank Center	Jon Moxley (c) vs. "Hangman" Adam Page for the AEW World Championship		
Thanksgiving Eve	November 23	Chicago, Illinois	Wintrust Arena	Chris Jericho (c) vs. Tomohiro Ishii for the ROH World Championship		
Winter Is Coming	December 14	Garland, Texas	Curtis Culwell Center	MJF (c) vs. Ricky Starks in a Winner Takes All match for the AEW World Championship and AEW Dynamite Diamond Ring		
Holiday Bash	December 21	San Antonio, Texas	Freeman Coliseum	Jamie Hayter (c) vs. Hikaru Shida for the AEW Women's World Championship		
Holiday Bash	December 21 (aired December 23)	San Antonio, Texas	Freeman Coliseum	Jay Lethal and Jeff Jarrett vs. Anthony Bowens and Daddy Ass		
New Year's Smash	December 28	Broomfield, Colorado	1stBank Center	Samoa Joe (c) vs. Wardlow for the AEW TNT Championship		
New Year's Smash	December 28 (aired December 30)	Broomfield, Colorado	1stBank Center	Swerve Strickland vs. Wheeler Yuta		
(c) – refers to the champion(s) heading into the match

=== 2023 ===
Event	Date	Location	Venue	Main event	Notes	Ref
Battle of the Belts V	January 6	Portland, Oregon	Veterans Memorial Coliseum	Orange Cassidy (c) vs. Kip Sabian for the AEW All-Atlantic Championship		
Championship Fight Night	February 8	El Paso, Texas	El Paso County Coliseum	The Acclaimed (Anthony Bowens and Max Caster) (c) vs. The Gunns (Austin Gunn and Colten Gunn) for the AEW World Tag Team Championship		
Slam Dunk	February 15 (aired February 17)	Laredo, Texas	Sames Auto Arena	Dustin Rhodes vs. Swerve Strickland		
St. Patrick's Day Slam	March 15 (aired March 17)	Winnipeg, Manitoba, Canada	Canada Life Centre	Daniel Garcia vs. Brody King		
Battle of the Belts VI	April 7	Kingston, Rhode Island	Ryan Center	The Lucha Brothers (Penta El Zero Miedo and Rey Fénix) (c) vs. Q. T. Marshall and Powerhouse Hobbs for the ROH World Tag Team Championship		
Championship Friday	May 31 (aired June 2)	San Diego, California	Viejas Arena	Katsuyori Shibata (c) vs. Lee Moriarty for the ROH Pure Championship		
Rampage 100	July 5 (aired July 7)	Edmonton, Alberta, Canada	Rogers Place	Big Bill and Brian Cage vs. Matt Sydal and Trent Beretta in a Blind Eliminator Tag Team Tournament		
Battle of the Belts VII	July 15	Calgary, Alberta, Canada	Scotiabank Saddledome	Luchasaurus (c) vs. Shawn Spears for the AEW TNT Championship		
Blood & Guts	July 19	Boston, Massachusetts	TD Garden	Blackpool Combat Club (Jon Moxley, Claudio Castagnoli, and Wheeler Yuta), Konosuke Takeshita, and Pac vs. The Golden Elite (Kenny Omega, "Hangman" Adam Page, Matt Jackson, Nick Jackson, and Kota Ibushi) in a Blood and Guts match		
Royal Rampage	July 19 (aired July 21)	Boston, Massachusetts	TD Garden	Kris Statlander (c) vs. Marina Shafir for the AEW TBS Championship		
Dynamite 200	August 2	Tampa, Florida	Yuengling Center	Toni Storm (c) vs. Hikaru Shida for the AEW Women's Championship		
Fight for the Fallen	August 16	Nashville, Tennessee	Bridgestone Arena	The Young Bucks (Matt Jackson and Nick Jackson) vs. The Gunns (Austin Gunn and Colten Gunn)		
Fight for the Fallen	August 16 (aired August 18)	Nashville, Tennessee	Bridgestone Arena	Hikaru Shida and Skye Blue vs. The Outcasts (Ruby Soho and Toni Storm)		
Fight for the Fallen	August 19	Lexington, Kentucky	Rupp Arena	Darby Allin vs. Christian Cage		
Fyter Fest	August 19 (aired August 25)	Lexington, Kentucky	Rupp Arena	The Outcasts (Saraya and Toni Storm) vs. Dr. Britt Baker, D.M.D. and Hikaru Shida		
Fyter Fest	August 23	Duluth, Georgia	Gas South Arena	Aussie Open (Mark Davis and Kyle Fletcher) (c) vs. The Hardys (Jeff Hardy and Matt Hardy) for the ROH World Tag Team Championship		
Fyter Fest	August 23 (aired August 26)	Duluth, Georgia	Gas South Arena	Darby Allin, Sting, Hook, and CM Punk vs. Mogul Embassy (Brian Cage and Swerve Strickland), Jay White, and Luchasaurus in an All In all-star eight-man tag team match		
Grand Slam	September 20	Queens, New York	Arthur Ashe Stadium	MJF (c) vs. Samoa Joe for the AEW World Championship		
Grand Slam	September 20 (aired September 22)	Queens, New York	Arthur Ashe Stadium	Mogul Embassy (Brian Cage, Bishop Kaun, and Toa Liona) (c) vs. The Elite (Matt Jackson, Nick Jackson, and "Hangman" Adam Page) for the ROH World Six-Man Tag Team Championship		
Dynamite Anniversary	October 4	Stockton, California	Stockton Arena	Toni Storm vs. Skye Blue		
Title Tuesday	October 10	Independence, Missouri	Cable Dahmer Arena	Adam Copeland vs. Luchasaurus		
Battle of the Belts VIII	October 21	Memphis, Tennessee	FedExForum	The Acclaimed (Anthony Bowens and Max Caster) and Billy Gunn (c) vs. Matt Menard, Angelo Parker, and Daniel Garcia for the AEW World Trios Championship		
Thanksgiving Eve	November 22	Chicago, Illinois	Wintrust Arena	Jon Moxley vs. Mark Briscoe in a Gold League match of the Continental Classic		
Winter Is Coming	December 13	Arlington, Texas	College Park Center	Jon Moxley vs. Swerve Strickland in a Gold League match of the Continental Classic		
Winter Is Coming	December 13 (aired December 15)	Arlington, Texas	College Park Center	Top Flight (Dante Martin and Darius Martin) and Action Andretti vs. Komander, El Hijo del Vikingo, and Penta El Zero Miedo		
Winter Is Coming	December 16	Garland, Texas	Curtis Culwell Center	Bryan Danielson vs. Brody King in a Blue League match of the Continental Classic		
Holiday Bash	December 20	Oklahoma City, Oklahoma	Paycom Center	Jay White vs. Jon Moxley in a Gold League match of the Continental Classic		
Holiday Bash	December 20 (aired December 22)	Oklahoma City, Oklahoma	Paycom Center	El Hijo del Vikingo (c) vs. Black Taurus for the AAA Mega Championship		
Holiday Bash	December 23	San Antonio, Texas	Frost Bank Center	Eddie Kingston vs. Andrade El Idolo in a Blue League match of the Continental Classic		
New Year's Smash	December 27	Orlando, Florida	Addition Financial Arena	MJF (c) vs. The Devil's Masked Men in a 2-on-1 handicap match for the ROH World Tag Team Championship		
New Year's Smash	December 27 (aired December 29)	Orlando, Florida	Addition Financial Arena	Orange Cassidy, Trent Beretta, and Rocky Romero vs. Top Flight (Dante Martin and Darius Martin) and Action Andretti		
(c) – refers to the champion(s) heading into the match

=== 2024 ===
Event	Date	Location	Venue	Main event	Notes	Ref
Homecoming	January 10	Jacksonville, Florida	Daily's Place	Sting and Darby Allin vs. The Don Callis Family (Konosuke Takeshita and Powerhouse Hobbs) in a Texas Tornado match		
Homecoming	January 10 (aired January 12)	Jacksonville, Florida	Daily's Place	The Dark Order (Evil Uno, John Silver, and Alex Reynolds) vs. Matt Menard, Angelo Parker, and Jake Hager		
Battle of the Belts IX	January 13	Norfolk, Virginia	Chartway Arena	Orange Cassidy (c) vs. Preston Vance for the AEW International Championship		
Big Business	March 13	Boston, Massachusetts	TD Garden	Willow Nightingale vs. Riho		
Battle of the Belts X	April 13	Highland Heights, Kentucky	Truist Arena	Athena (c) vs. Red Velvet for the ROH Women's World Championship		
Collision's 1-Year Anniversary	June 15	Youngstown, Ohio	Covelli Centre	House of Black (Malakai Black, Brody King, and Buddy Matthews) vs. Bang Bang Gang (Jay White, Austin Gunn, and Colten Gunn)		
Beach Break	July 3	Chicago, Illinois	Wintrust Arena	Will Ospreay (c) vs. Daniel Garcia for the AEW International Championship		
Beach Break	July 3 (aired July 5)	Chicago, Illinois	Wintrust Arena	Mariah May vs. Hikaru Shida		
Dynamite 250	July 17	North Little Rock, Arkansas	Simmons Bank Arena	Swerve Strickland vs. Kazuchika Okada		
Blood & Guts	July 24	Nashville, Tennessee	Bridgestone Arena	Team AEW (Swerve Strickland, Mark Briscoe, Darby Allin, Max Caster, and Anthony Bowens) vs. Team Elite (Matthew Jackson, Nicholas Jackson, Kazuchika Okada, Jack Perry, and "Hangman" Adam Page) in a Blood and Guts match		
Royal Rampage	July 24 (aired July 26)	Nashville, Tennessee	Bridgestone Arena	Private Party (Marq Quen and Isiah Kassidy) vs. The Don Callis Family (Rush and Kyle Fletcher) vs. The Outrunners (Truth Magnum and Turbo Floyd) vs. The Righteous (Vincent and Dutch)		
Battle for the Booty	July 25	San Diego, California	Fifth Avenue Landing	Orange Cassidy and Willow Nightingale vs. Johnny TV and Taya Valkyrie for the AEW x Adult Swim Booty Championship	(Note: Held in conjunction with San Diego Comic Con and Adult Swim's Pirate Parrrty on the Green)	
Battle of the Belts XI	July 27	Arlington, Texas	Esports Stadium Arlington	Dustin Rhodes and The Von Erichs (Marshall Von Erich and Ross Von Erich) vs. Undisputed Kingdom (Roderick Strong, Matt Taven, and Mike Bennett) for the vacant ROH World Six-Man Tag Team Championship		
Grand Slam	September 25	Queens, New York	Arthur Ashe Stadium	Darby Allin vs. Jon Moxley to determine the number one contender to the AEW World Championship		
Grand Slam	September 25 (aired September 28)	Queens, New York	Arthur Ashe Stadium	Kazuchika Okada vs. Sammy Guevara in an AEW Continental Championship Eliminator match		
Dynamite's 5-Year Anniversary	October 2	Pittsburgh, Pennsylvania	Petersen Events Center	Bryan Danielson (c) vs. Kazuchika Okada for the AEW World Championship, with Okada's Continental Championship also on the line for the first twenty minutes	(Note: This show was extended to a two-and-a-half hour timeslot.)	
Title Tuesday	October 8	Spokane, Washington	Spokane Arena	Bryan Danielson and Wheeler Yuta vs. Claudio Castagnoli and Pac		
Battle of the Belts XII	October 17 (aired October 19)	Stockton, California	Adventist Health Arena	Mariah May (c) vs. Anna Jay in an AEW Women's World Championship Eliminator match		
Fright Night Dynamite	October 30	Cleveland, Ohio	Wolstein Center	Swerve Strickland vs. Shelton Benjamin		
Thanksgiving Eve	November 27	Chicago, Illinois	Wintrust Arena	Brody King vs. Darby Allin in a Gold League match of the Continental Classic		
Winter Is Coming	December 11	Kansas City, Missouri	T-Mobile Center	Mariah May (c) vs. Mina Shirakawa for the AEW Women's World Championship		
Winter Is Coming	December 11 (aired December 13)	Kansas City, Missouri	T-Mobile Center	Powerhouse Hobbs and Mark Davis vs. The Don Callis Family (Konosuke Takeshita and Lance Archer)		
Winter Is Coming	December 12 (aired December 14)	St. Louis, Missouri	Chaifetz Arena	Kyle Fletcher vs. Mark Briscoe in a Blue League match of the Continental Classic		
Holiday Bash	December 18	Washington, D.C.	Entertainment & Sports Arena	Death Riders (Jon Moxley, Pac, and Wheeler Yuta) vs. "Hangman" Adam Page, Jay White, and Orange Cassidy		
Holiday Bash	December 18 (aired December 20)	Washington, D.C.	Entertainment & Sports Arena	Brody King vs. Komander in a Gold League match of the Continental Classic		
Christmas Collision	December 21	New York City, New York	Hammerstein Ballroom	Darby Allin vs. Claudio Castagnoli in a Gold League match of the Continental Classic		
Dynamite on 34th Street	December 22 (aired December 25)	New York City, New York	Hammerstein Ballroom	Kyle Fletcher vs. Daniel Garcia in a Blue League match of the Continental Classic		
New Year's Smash	December 22 (aired December 27)	New York City, New York	Hammerstein Ballroom	Hook vs. Nick Wayne		
(c) – refers to the champion(s) heading into the match

=== 2025 ===
Event	Date	Location	Venue	Main event	Notes	Ref
Fight for the Fallen	January 1	Asheville, North Carolina	Harrah's Cherokee Center	Rated FTR (Cope, Cash Wheeler, and Dax Harwood) vs. Death Riders (Jon Moxley, Claudio Castagnoli, and Wheeler Yuta)		
Maximum Carnage	January 15	Cincinnati, Ohio	Brady Music Center	Jon Moxley (c) vs. Powerhouse Hobbs for the AEW World Championship		
Maximum Carnage	January 16 (aired January 18)	Cincinnati, Ohio	Brady Music Center	Powerhouse Hobbs, The Outrunners (Truth Magnum and Turbo Floyd), and Rated FTR (Dax Harwood, Cash Wheeler, and Cope) vs. Death Riders (Jon Moxley, Claudio Castagnoli, and Wheeler Yuta) and The Learning Tree (Chris Jericho, Big Bill, and Bryan Keith)		
Homecoming	January 25	Jacksonville, Florida	Daily's Place	Konosuke Takeshita (c) vs. Katsuyori Shibata for the AEW International Championship		
Grand Slam Australia	February 15	Brisbane, Queensland, Australia	Brisbane Entertainment Centre	Mariah May (c) vs. "Timeless" Toni Storm for the AEW Women's World Championship	(Note: Aired during the 2025 NBA All-Star Weekend, which pre-empted that week's regular airing of Collision.)	
Global Wars Australia	February 15 (aired February 17)	Brisbane, Queensland, Australia	Brisbane Entertainment Centre	Athena (c) vs. Alex Windsor for the ROH Women's World Championship	(Note: Co-produced with Ring of Honor; broadcast as a special ROH presentation.)	
Slam Dunk Saturday	March 19 (aired March 22)	Ralston, Nebraska	Liberty First Credit Union Arena	The Don Callis Family (Konosuke Takeshita, Brian Cage, and Lance Archer) vs. Powerhouse Hobbs, Mark Briscoe, and Rocky Romero	(Note: Due to the NCAA Division I men's basketball tournament on TNT, Collision was split into two one-hour episodes and was aired on 11pm ET each night.)	
Slam Dunk Sunday	March 19 (aired March 23)	Ralston, Nebraska	Liberty First Credit Union Arena	Titanes del Aire (Komander and Hologram) vs. La Facción Ingobernable (Dralístico and The Beast Mortos)	(Note: Due to the NCAA Division I men's basketball tournament on TNT, Collision was split into two one-hour episodes and was aired on 11pm ET each night.)	
Spring BreakThru	April 16	Boston, Massachusetts	MGM Music Hall at Fenway	Death Riders (Claudio Castagnoli, Wheeler Yuta, and interim champion Jon Moxley) (c) vs. Samoa Joe, Powerhouse Hobbs, and Katsuyori Shibata for the AEW World Trios Championship	(Note: This episode marks Dynamite overtaking WCW Monday Nitro as the longest-running weekly primetime professional wrestling program in Turner Sports history.)	
Spring BreakThru	April 17	Boston, Massachusetts	MGM Music Hall at Fenway	Kris Statlander and Julia Hart vs. Mercedes Moné and Harley Cameron	(Note: This episode marks Dynamite overtaking WCW Monday Nitro as the longest-running weekly primetime professional wrestling program in Turner Sports history.)	
Playoff Palooza	April 23 (aired April 26)	New Orleans, Louisiana	Lakefront Arena	FTR (Cash Wheeler and Dax Harwood) vs. The Paragon (Roderick Strong and Kyle O'Reilly)		
Beach Break	May 14	Hoffman Estates, Illinois	Now Arena	Jon Moxley (c) vs. Samoa Joe in a Steel Cage match for the AEW World Championship		
Beach Break	May 14 (aired May 17)	Hoffman Estates, Illinois	Now Arena	Powerhouse Hobbs vs. Wheeler Yuta		
Fyter Fest	June 4	Denver, Colorado	Mission Ballroom	Kenny Omega (c) vs. Brody King vs. Claudio Castagnoli vs. Máscara Dorada in a Four-way match for the AEW International Championship	(Note: Aired as a four-hour marathon broadcast of Dynamite and Collision.)	
Fyter Fest	June 4	Denver, Colorado	Mission Ballroom	The Paragon (Adam Cole, Kyle O'Reilly, and Roderick Strong) and Daniel Garcia vs. The Don Callis Family (Josh Alexander, Lance Archer, Trent Beretta, and Rocky Romero)	(Note: Aired as a four-hour marathon broadcast of Dynamite and Collision.)	
Summer Blockbuster	June 11	Portland, Oregon	Theater of the Clouds at Moda Center	TayJay (Tay Melo and Anna Jay) vs. Megan Bayne and Penelope Ford		
Summer Blockbuster	June 11	Portland, Oregon	Theater of the Clouds at Moda Center	The Don Callis Family (Hechicero, Josh Alexander, Konosuke Takeshita, and Lance Archer) vs. Daniel Garcia and Paragon (Adam Cole, Kyle O'Reilly, and Roderick Strong)		
CMLL vs. AEW & ROH	June 17	Mexico City, Mexico	Arena México	Bandido (c) vs. Máscara Dorada for the ROH World Championship	(Note: Co-produced with Consejo Mundial de Lucha Libre and Ring of Honor; aired as a special presentation of CMLL's Martes Populares and a special ROH livestreaming event.)	
Grand Slam Mexico	June 18	Mexico City, Mexico	Arena México	Will Ospreay, Swerve Strickland, and The Opps (Samoa Joe, Katsuyori Shibata, and Powerhouse Hobbs) vs. Death Riders (Jon Moxley and Wheeler Yuta), The Young Bucks (Matthew Jackson and Nicholas Jackson) and The Beast Mortos	(Note: Co-produced with Consejo Mundial de Lucha Libre.)	
Global Wars Mexico	June 18 (aired June 26)	Mexico City, Mexico	Arena México	Blue Panther vs. Lee Moriarty	(Note: Co-produced with Consejo Mundial de Lucha Libre and Ring of Honor; aired as a special presentation of Ring of Honor Wrestling.)	
Fantastica Mania Mexico	June 20	Mexico City, Mexico	Arena México	Bandido and Hologram vs. Mistico and Máscara Dorada	(Note: Co-produced with Consejo Mundial de Lucha Libre, New Japan Pro-Wrestling, Revolution Pro Wrestling and Ring of Honor; aired as a special presentation of CMLL's Super Viernes.)	
Dynamite 300	July 2	Ontario, California	Toyota Arena	Kazuchika Okada vs Kota Ibushi		
Collision 100	July 2 (aired July 5)	Ontario, California	Toyota Arena	Kyle Fletcher vs Daniel Garcia to determine the number one contender for the AEW TNT Championship		
September to Remember	September 17	London, Ontario, Canada	Canada Life Place	Thekla vs. Queen Aminata	(Note: Aired as a three-hour marathon broadcast as a 2-hour Dynamite and a one-hour Collision.)	
September to Remember	September 17	London, Ontario, Canada	Canada Life Place	The Don Callis Family (Josh Alexander and Hechicero) vs. Top Flight (Darius Martin and Dante Martin) in a qualifying match for an AEW World Tag Team Championship match at All Out	(Note: Aired as a three-hour marathon broadcast as a 2-hour Dynamite and a one-hour Collision.)	
Saturday Tailgate Brawl: All Out	September 20	Toronto, Ontario, Canada	Scotiabank Arena	Harley Cameron, Mina Shirakawa, Queen Aminata, and Willow Nightingale vs. Megan Bayne, Penelope Ford, and Triangle of Madness (Julia Hart and Skye Blue) in an eight-woman Tornado Tailgate Brawl	(Note: A special one-hour presentation of Collision.) (Note: Also served as the pre-show for the pay-per-view event held immediately after.)	
Dynamite's 6-Year Anniversary	October 1	Hollywood, Florida	Hard Rock Live	Darby Allin and Kris Statlander vs. The Death Riders (Marina Shafir and Wheeler Yuta)		
Homecoming: Title Tuesday	October 7	Jacksonville, Florida	Daily's Place	Orange Cassidy vs. Pac		
Homecoming	October 8 (aired October 11)	Jacksonville, Florida	Daily's Place	FTR (Cash Wheeler and Dax Harwood) and Megan Bayne vs. JetSpeed (Kevin Knight and "Speedball" Mike Bailey) and Willow Nightingale		
Saturday Tailgate Brawl: WrestleDream	October 18	St. Louis, Missouri	Chaifetz Arena	FTR (Cash Wheeler and Dax Harwood) vs. JetSpeed (Kevin Knight and "Speedball" Mike Bailey)		
Fright Night Dynamite	October 29	Edinburg, Texas	Bert Ogden Arena	Samoa Joe vs. Bobby Lashley vs. Hook vs. Ricochet in a four way AEW World Championship #1 contendership match		
Fright Night Collision	October 29 (aired November 1)	Edinburg, Texas	Bert Ogden Arena	Bandido (c) vs. Máscara Dorada for the ROH World Championship		
Blood & Guts	November 12	Greensboro, North Carolina	First Horizon Coliseum	Darby Allin, Roderick Strong, and The Conglomeration (Mark Briscoe, Orange Cassidy, and Kyle O'Reilly) vs. Death Riders (Jon Moxley, Claudio Castagnoli, Daniel Garcia, Pac, and Wheeler Yuta)		
Saturday Tailgate Brawl: Full Gear	November 22	Newark, New Jersey	Prudential Center	El Sky Team (Mascara Dorada, Mistico, and Neón) (c) vs. The Don Callis Family (Hechicero, Kazuchika Okada, and Konosuke Takeshita) for the CMLL World Trios Championship		
Thanksgiving Eve	November 26	Nashville, Tennessee	The Pinnacle	Claudio Castagnoli vs Orange Cassidy in a Blue League match of the Continental Classic		
Thanksgiving Collision	November 26 (aired November 27)	Nashville, Tennessee	The Pinnacle	Konosuke Takeshita vs Roderick Strong in a Blue League match of the Continental Classic		
Winter Is Coming	December 10	Atlanta, Georgia	Gateway Center Arena	Samoa Joe (c) vs. Eddie Kingston for the AEW World Championship		
Winter Is Coming	December 13	Cardiff, Wales, United Kingdom	Utilita Arena Cardiff	Mark Briscoe (c) vs. Daniel Garcia for the AEW TNT Championship		
Stocking Stuffer	December 13 (aired December 16)	Cardiff, Wales, United Kingdom	Utilita Arena Cardiff	Death Riders (Jon Moxley, Pac, and Wheeler Yuta) vs. Grizzled Young Veterans (James Drake and Zack Gibson) and Nathan Cruz		
Holiday Bash	December 17	Manchester, England, United Kingdom	Co-op Live	Dynamite Diamond Battle Royale		
Holiday Bash	December 17	Manchester, England, United Kingdom	Co-op Live	FTR (Cash Wheeler and Dax Harwood) (c) vs. Bang Bang Gang (Austin Gunn and Juice Robinson) for the AEW World Tag Team Championship		
Holiday Bash	December 17 (aired December 20)	Manchester, England, United Kingdom	Co-op Live	Kevin Knight vs. Kazuchika Okada in a Gold League match of the Continental Classic		
Dynamite on 34th Street	December 20 (airing December 24)	New York City, New York	Hammerstein Ballroom	"Jungle" Jack Perry vs Pac in a Gold League match of the Continental Classic		
Christmas Collision	December 21 (airing December 25)	New York City, New York	Hammerstein Ballroom	Kazuchika Okada vs "Speedball" Mike Bailey in a Gold League match of the Continental Classic		
New Year's Smash	December 31	Ralston, Nebraska	Liberty First Credit Union Arena	Mercedes Moné (c) vs. Willow Nightingale for the AEW TBS Championship		
(c) – refers to the champion(s) heading into the match

=== 2026 ===
Event	Date	Location	Venue	Main event	Notes	Ref
Maximum Carnage	January 14	Phoenix, Arizona	Arizona Financial Theatre	MJF (c) vs. Bandido for the AEW World Championship		
Maximum Carnage	January 14 (aired January 17)	Phoenix, Arizona	Arizona Financial Theatre	The Opps (Samoa Joe, Powerhouse Hobbs and Katsuyori Shibata) (c) vs. "Hangman" Adam Page and JetSpeed ("Speedball" Mike Bailey and Kevin Knight) for the AEW World Trios Championship		
Grand Slam Australia	February 14	Sydney, New South Wales, Australia	Qudos Bank Arena	MJF (c) vs. Brody King for the AEW World Championship		
Slam Dunk Saturday	March 18 (aired March 21)	Fresno, California	Save Mart Center	The Death Riders (Claudio Castagnoli and Daniel Garcia) vs. Komander and Máscara Dorada	(Note: Due to the NCAA Division I men's basketball tournament on TNT, Collision was split into two one-hour episodes and was aired on 11pm ET each night.)	
Slam Dunk Sunday	March 18 (aired March 22)	Fresno, California	Save Mart Center	JetSpeed (Kevin Knight and "Speedball" Mike Bailey) and Místico (c) vs. The Don Callis Family (El Clon, Josh Alexander and Konosuke Takeshita) for the AEW World Trios Championship	(Note: Due to the NCAA Division I men's basketball tournament on TNT, Collision was split into two one-hour episodes and was aired on 11pm ET each night.)	
Spring Break-Thru	April 15	Everett, Washington	Angel of the Winds Arena	MJF (c) vs. Darby Allin for the AEW World Championship		
Spring Break-Thru	April 16	Everett, Washington	Angel of the Winds Arena	Thekla (c) vs. Alex Windsor for the AEW Women's World Championship		
Playoff Palooza	April 25	Portland, Oregon	Veterans Memorial Coliseum	Chris Jericho and The Hurt Syndicate (Bobby Lashley and Shelton Benjamin) (with MVP) vs. The Demand (Bishop Kaun, Toa Liona and Ricochet)		
Fairway to Hell	May 9	Palm Beach Gardens, Florida	SoFi Center	Darby Allin (c) vs. Pac in a No Count Outs match for the AEW World Championship	(Note: A one-hour broadcast on TBS, having been pre-empted by the 2026 Stanley Cup Playoffs airing on TNT.)	
Summer Blockbuster	June 10	Cincinnati, Ohio	Andrew J. Brady Music Center	Swerve Strickland vs. Brody King in a Owen Hart Owen Hart Foundation 2026 Men's Tournament semi final match		
Summer Blockbuster	June 11 (aired June 13)	Cincinnati, Ohio	Andrew J. Brady Music Center	Shane Taylor Promotions (Carlie Bravo, Lee Moriarty, Shane Taylor, Shawn Dean, and Trish Adora) vs. Death Riders (Claudio Castagnoli, Daniel Garcia, Jon Moxley, Marina Shafir, and Pac) in a Cincinnati Street Fight		
Beach Break	July 8	Clearwater, Florida	BayCare Sound	MJF (c) vs. Kenny Omega in a Last Chance Match for the AEW World Championship		
Brawl in the Ballpark	July 10 (aired August 23)	Minneapolis, Minnesota	Target Field	The Hurt Syndicate (Bobby Lashley and Shelton Benjamin) vs. Shane Taylor Promotions (Shane Taylor and Lee Moriarty)		
CMLL vs. AEW	August 4	Mexico City, Mexico	Arena Mexico	Kyle Fletcher vs. Mascara Dorada	(Note: Co-produced with Consejo Mundial de Lucha Libre)	
Grand Slam Mexico	August 5	Mexico City, Mexico	Arena Mexico	Will Ospreay vs. Mark Davis in a Mexico City Street Fight	(Note: Co-produced with Consejo Mundial de Lucha Libre)	
CMLL vs. AEW	August 8	Mexico City, Mexico	Arena Mexico	El Clon and Templario vs. Bandido and Titan	(Note: Co-produced with Consejo Mundial de Lucha Libre)	
CMLL vs. AEW	August 9	Mexico City, Mexico	Arena Mexico	Bandido and Místico vs. Don Callis Family (Hechicero and El Clon)	(Note: Co-produced with Consejo Mundial de Lucha Libre)	
Rebel Heart	September 9	Athens, Georgia	Akins Ford Arena	The Young Bucks (Matt Jackson and Nick Jackson) vs The Don Callis Family (Kevin Knight and Kyle Fletcher) in a Tables Match	. (Note: Special episode dedicated to Rebel, following her having been diagnosed with ALS)	
A Tribute to "The Butcher" Andy Williams	September 12	Springfield, Massachusetts	MassMutual Center	12-man "The Butcher" Battle Royale	(Note: Memorial event dedicated to "The Butcher" Andy Williams, who passed away a week prior.)	
A Tribute to Pac	September 30	Pittsburgh, Pennsylvania	Petersen Events Center	The Death Riders (Bryan Danielson, Claudio Castagnoli, Wheeler Yuta, Daniel Garcia, and Gabe Kidd) vs. The Don Callis Family (Wardlow, Lance Archer, Mark Davis, Josh Alexander, and Jake Doyle)	(Note: Memorial event dedicated to "The Bastard" Pac, who passed away three days prior.)	
Grand Slam France	October 6	Paris, France	Adidas Arena	Will Ospreay (c) vs. Kazuchika Okada for the AEW World Championship		
Grand Slam France	October 6 (airing October 10)	Paris, France	Adidas Arena	The Death Riders (Claudio Castagnoli, Wheeler Yuta, Daniel Garcia, and Marina Shafir) vs. The Conglomeration (Orange Cassidy, Roderick Strong, Kyle O'Reilly, and Willow Nightingale)		
Blood & Guts	November 4	Jacksonville, Florida	VyStar Veterans Memorial Arena	Adam Copeland, Darby Allin, Steven Borden, Will Ospreay and The Young Bucks (Matt Jackson and Nick Jackson) vs. The Don Callis Family (Jake Doyle, Kazuchika Okada, Kevin Knight, Kyle Fletcher, Mark Davis and Wardlow) in the Men's Blood & Guts match		
Chris Jericho's Rock 'N' Wrestling Rager at Sea – Seventh Cruise of a Seventh Cruise	November 7	Miami, Florida	Norwegian Jewel	Andrade El Idolo (c) vs. Tommaso Ciampa for the AEW National Championship		
Thanksgiving Eve	November 25	Omaha, Nebraska	Liberty First Credit Union Arena	TBA		
Thanksgiving Collision	November 25 (airing November 26)	Omaha, Nebraska	Liberty First Credit Union Arena	TBA		
Winter Is Coming	December 9	Monterrey, Nuevo Leon, Mexico	Arena Monterrey	TBA		
Winter Is Coming	December 9 (airing December 12)	Monterrey, Nuevo Leon, Mexico	Arena Monterrey	TBA		
Holiday Bash	December 23	Chicago, Illinois	Wintrust Arena	TBA		
Holiday Bash	December 23 (airing December 26)	Chicago, Illinois	Wintrust Arena	TBA		
(c) – refers to the champion(s) heading into the match

== See also ==
- List of All Elite Wrestling pay-per-view events
- List of AEW Dynamite special episodes
- List of AEW Rampage special episodes
- List of AEW Collision special episodes
