= Brawl in the Ballpark =

2026 All Elite Wrestling live event

- Promotion: All Elite Wrestling
- Date: July 10, 2026 (aired August 23, 2026)
- City: Minneapolis, Minnesota
- Venue: Target Field

All Elite Wrestling special events chronology
← Previous; CMLL vs. AEW	Next → Rebel Heart

Brawl in the Ballpark was a professional wrestling live event produced by All Elite Wrestling (AEW). The event took place on July 10, 2026 at Target Field in Minneapolis, Minnesota and aired on tape delay on August 23, 2026 on MyAEW. The event took place immediately after an American League baseball game between the Minnesota Twins and the Los Angeles Angels.

== Production ==
Other on-screen personnel
Role:	Name:
Commentators	Tony Schiavone
Commentators	Ian Riccaboni
Ring announcer	Bobby Cruise

=== Background ===
On May 19, 2026, All Elite Wrestling and the Minnesota Twins announced that they would be teaming up to present the inaugural Brawl in the Ballpark event at Target Field in Minneapolis, Minnesota on July 10, 2026 shortly after a game between the Twins and the Los Angeles Angels, with attendance free to anyone who still had a ticket from the baseball game. On the day of the event, AEW announced the card for the event which would feature the Hurt Syndicate (Bobby Lashley and Shelton Benjamin) fighting against Shane Taylor Promotions (Shane Taylor and Lee Moriarty), Orange Cassidy vs. Wheeler Yuta, Hook, Anthony Bowens, and Action Andretti vs. Komander and Top Flight (Dante Martin and Darius Martin) in a six-man tag team match, Julia Hart vs. Hyan, and Brian Cage vs. Serpentico. On July 30, 2026, AEW announced that the event would be airing on the MyAEW streaming service on August 23, 2026.

=== Storylines ===
Brawl in the Ballpark featured professional wrestling matches that involved different wrestlers from pre-existing feuds and storylines. Storylines were produced on AEW's weekly television programs, Dynamite and Collision.

== Results ==
No.	Results	Stipulations	Times
1	Orange Cassidy defeated Wheeler Yuta by pinfall	Singles match	8:09
2	The Opps (Hook, Anthony Bowens, and Action Andretti) defeated Komander and Top Flight (Dante Martin and Darius Martin) by pinfall	Trios match	14:16
3	Julia Hart defeated Hyan by submission	Singles match	5:53
4	Brian Cage defeated Serpentico by pinfall	Singles match	4:32
5	Hurt Syndicate (Bobby Lashley and Shelton Benjamin) defeated Shane Taylor Promotions (Shane Taylor and Lee Moriarty) (with Carlie Bravo) by pinfall	Tag team match	13:10
