= AEW The House Always Wins =

The House Always Wins
- Promotional poster featuring various AEW wrestlers
- Promotion: All Elite Wrestling
- Date: April 9, 2021
- City: Jacksonville, Florida
- Venue: Daily's Place
- Attendance: 1,300

The House Always Wins was a professional wrestling house show produced by All Elite Wrestling (AEW). The event took place on April 9, 2021 at Daily's Place in Jacksonville, Florida during WrestleMania 37 weekend. The event was later aired on September 13, 2026 on the MyAEW streaming service and AEW's YouTube channel.

== Production ==
=== Background ===
On April 24, 2021, during an episode of Dynamite, AEW announced plans for their first house show. On March 26, 2021, AEW announced three matches that would take place during the event which included a six man tag team match between the teams of Death Triangle (Pac, Penta El Zero Miedo, and Rey Fenix), Matt Sydal, and Mike Sydal and The Young Bucks (Matt Jackson and Nick Jackson), Kenny Omega, Konosuke Takeshita, and Michael Nakazawa, Kenny Omega and Michael Nakazawa vs. Matt Sydal and Mike Sydal, and Cody Rhodes vs. Ethan Page.

=== Storylines ===
The House Always Wins featured professional wrestling matches that involved different wrestlers from pre-existing feuds and storylines.

== Results ==
No.	Results	Stipulations	Times
1	The Butcher (with Matt Hardy and The Bunny) defeated Alex Reynolds, Austin Gunn, Colt Cabana, Colten Gunn, Ethan Page, Evil Uno, Five, Lance Archer, Powerhouse Hobbs, Ricky Starks, Scorpio Sky, Stu Grayson, Ten, and The Blade by last eliminating Lance Archer	AEW TNT Championship #1 contendership 15-man Battle royal	8:48
2	The Pinnacle (Cash Wheeler, Dax Harwood, MJF, and Shawn Spears) (with Tully Blanchard and Wardlow) defeated Christopher Daniels, Dante Martin, and Jurassic Express (Jungle Boy and Luchasaurus) by pinfall	Eight-man tag team match	14:30
3	Cody Rhodes defeated Aaron Solo by pinfall	Duuuval street fight	15:47
4	Jade Cargill defeated Reka Tehaka	Singles match	3:30
5	Best Friends (Chuck Taylor and Trent) and Orange Cassidy (with Kris Statlander) defeated The Hybrid2 (Angélico and Jack Evans) and Max Caster by pinfall	Six-man tag team match	11:10
6	Eddie Kingston defeated Cezar Bononi by pinfall	Singles match	9:20
7	Hikaru Shida, Red Velvet, Ryo Mizunami, and Tay Conti defeated Dr. Britt Baker DMD, Nyla Rose, Rebel, and The Bunny by pinfall	Eight-man tag team match	14:00
8	Death Triangle (Pac, Penta El Zero Miedo, and Rey Fenix), Matt Sydal, and Mike Sydal defeated The Young Bucks (Matt Jackson and Nick Jackson), Kenny Omega, Konosuke Takeshita, and Michael Nakazawa by pinfall	Ten-man tag team match	12:25
9	Darby Allin (c) defeated The Butcher (with Matt Hardy, The Blade, and The Bunny) by pinfall	Singles match for the AEW TNT Championship	8:18
(c) / – the champion(s) heading into the match
