= AEW Battle of the Belts =

Professional wrestling television special series

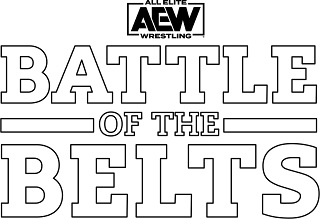
- AEW Battle of the Belts logo
- Genre: Professional wrestling
- Created by: Tony Khan
- Country of origin: United States
- Original language: English
- No. of episodes: 12

Production
- Producer: Tony Khan
- Running time: 60 minutes
- Production company: All Elite Wrestling

Original release
- Network: TNT
- Release: January 8, 2022 – October 19, 2024

Related
- AEW Dynamite; AEW Collision; AEW Rampage; AEW Dark; AEW Dark: Elevation; Ring of Honor Wrestling

AEW Battle of the Belts is an American series of professional wrestling television specials that was produced by the American promotion All Elite Wrestling (AEW), running from January 8, 2022, to October 19, 2024. The one-hour specials were broadcast on TNT in the United States and aired quarterly throughout the year, with a total of 12 episodes produced. The series was originally broadcast on select Saturday nights at 8:00 p.m. Eastern Time (ET), but was moved to Fridays at 11:00 p.m. ET beginning with the fourth episode before its move back to Saturdays at 10:00 p.m. ET with the seventh episode. Some episodes aired live, while a select few others aired on tape delay, recorded in conjunction with AEW's other weekly television programs. The series was quietly canceled as it was not included in AEW's media rights deal with Warner Bros. Discovery that took effect on January 1, 2025.

The theme of the show was originally that all matches were contested for professional wrestling championships with an average of three matches per episode; in 2024, this expanded to include matches for future opportunities at championships as well as standard non-title matches. Over the series 12 episodes, every AEW championship that was active during that time had been defended on the program, except the men's World Championship. These included five men's titles—the TNT Championship, the International Championship, the Continental Championship, the World Tag Team Championship, and the World Trios Championship—and both women's titles—the Women's World Championship and TBS Championship. There had also been five championships from AEW's sister promotion Ring of Honor (ROH) contested. These included four men's titles—the World Championship, the World Television Championship, the World Tag Team Championship, and the World Six-Man Tag Team Championship—and one women's title—the Women's World Championship. The former men's FTW Championship, which was used by AEW from July 2020 until its retirement in September 2024, also had defenses on the program.

Only three title changes occurred during Battle of the Belts episodes, two of which involved Sammy Guevara. The first was on the inaugural episode, which saw him defeat Dustin Rhodes to determine the interim TNT Champion, and the other was on the second episode in which he defeated Scorpio Sky to win his record-tying third TNT Championship. The third title change occurred on the 11th episode which saw Dustin Rhodes and The Von Erichs (Marshall Von Erich and Ross Von Erich) defeat The Undisputed Kingdom (Roderick Strong, Matt Taven, and Mike Bennett) to win the vacant ROH World Six-Man Tag Team Championship. There had also been four Championship Eliminator matches, a stipulation in which if the challenger defeats the champion, they get a future title match, but if they lose, they can no longer challenge that champion for as long as they hold the title. One of these Championship Eliminators featured the Women's World Championship of AEW's partner Mexican promotion Consejo Mundial de Lucha Libre, which happened on the 11th episode. The only match to not have any championship implications occurred on the 12th and final episode, which was a standard tag team match.

== History ==
In May 2021, the American professional wrestling promotion All Elite Wrestling (AEW) renegotiated its broadcasting deal with WarnerMedia (now Warner Bros. Discovery), which saw AEW's flagship television program, Wednesday Night Dynamite, move from TNT to TBS in January 2022, while its other weekly program at the time, Friday Night Rampage, remained on TNT. Also as part of the deal, AEW agreed to produce four quarterly television specials on TNT that would take place on Saturdays. Former AEW executive and wrestler Cody Rhodes said that these specials would be similar to Jim Crockett Promotions/World Championship Wrestling's Clash of the Champions and WWE's Saturday Night's Main Event shows, calling them super events. Wrestling journalist Dave Meltzer reported that the quarterly specials would be one-hour shows, but said they were originally planned to be longer, and also that they would feature pay-per-view caliber cards.

On November 24, 2021, the television special series was announced to be titled Battle of the Belts with the inaugural event scheduled to be held live at 8:00 p.m. Eastern Time (ET) on January 8, 2022, at the Bojangles Coliseum in Charlotte, North Carolina. The tagline was confirmed as "Saturday Fight Night". The name "Battle of the Belts" came from a National Wrestling Alliance event held from 1985 to 1987 by the promotion's Florida territory that was operated by Eddie Graham.

AEW President Tony Khan confirmed that due to the show's one-hour length, not all of AEW's championships would be defended on the specials, but their goal was to put on great championship matches. On the day of the inaugural event, Khan revealed that matches for the January 11 episode of their former YouTube show, Dark, were scheduled to be taped before the Battle of the Belts I live broadcast, with all other AEW champions participating in these Dark matches. The inaugural episode itself featured matches for the AEW Women's World Championship, the interim AEW TNT Championship, and the FTW Championship.

On February 15, 2022, AEW announced that Battle of the Belts II would be taped on April 15 at the Curtis Culwell Center in Garland, Texas, which aired on tape delay the next day on April 16. After Tony Khan's purchase of Ring of Honor (ROH) in March 2022, the ROH World Championship was scheduled to be defended at Battle of the Belts II, the first non-AEW championship defended on the series.

On August 4, 2022, Battle of the Belts IV was announced to be held on Friday, October 7. As Battle of the Belts was established as a Saturday night television special, it was expected that Battle of the Belts IV would air on tape delay the next day on October 8. However, due to WWE's Extreme Rules pay-per-view and livestreaming event airing that night, Battle of the Belts IV was instead scheduled to air live on October 7 at 11:00 p.m. ET right after the live broadcast of Rampage to avoid counter programming against WWE. Due to its Friday scheduling, its tagline was changed to "Friday Fight Night". This was also the first Battle of the Belts episode to not include matches for either the AEW Women's World Championship or TNT Championship, but it did feature the first defenses of the AEW TBS Championship, AEW All-Atlantic Championship (renamed International in March 2023), and ROH World Tag Team Championship on the program.

On November 2, 2022, it was announced that the Battle of the Belts series would continue with Battle of the Belts V, scheduled to air live on Friday, January 6, 2023, which featured the first defense of the AEW World Tag Team Championship on the program. Despite the addition of Saturday Night Collision to AEW's weekly lineup, which premiered on June 17, 2023, Khan confirmed that Battle of the Belts would continue, although its future on TNT was uncertain. On July 4, 2023, PWInsider reported that the show would remain on TNT with Battle of the Belts VII scheduled to be held on July 15 at the Scotiabank Saddledome in Calgary, Alberta, Canada at 10:00 p.m ET after the live broadcast of Collision on TNT. This in turn returned the special to Saturday nights and also marked the first Battle of the Belts to be held outside of the United States.

Battle of the Belts VIII, which took place on October 21, 2023, was the only Battle of the Belts to have four matches on the card; all other episodes had three. It would also be the first episode to include defenses of the AEW World Trios Championship and the ROH World Television Championship.

While the theme of Battle of the Belts was originally that all matches would be championship matches, in 2024, the show began to feature Championship Eliminator matches. A Championship Eliminator is a variation of a Last Chance match where if the challenger defeats the champion, they earn a future match for that championship, but if they lose, they can no longer challenge for that title for as long as the champion holds that title. This first occurred at Battle of the Belts X on April 13, 2024, in which reigning AEW International Champion Roderick Strong defeated Rocky Romero. This particular episode also saw no defense of an AEW branded championship, as in addition to the Championship Eliminator, the other two matches were for the FTW Championship and the ROH Women's World Championship, which was the first time for the latter to be defended on the program.

The Mexican promotion Consejo Mundial de Lucha Libre (CMLL), a partner promotion of AEW, would have one of its championships featured on a Battle of the Belts episode. At Battle of the Belts XI on July 27, 2024, reigning CMLL Women's World Champion Willow Nightingale defeated Deonna Purrazzo in a Championship Eliminator match. This episode was also the first time that the ROH World Six-Man Tag Team Championship was contested on the show.

The only match on the program to not have any championship implications occurred on the final episode, Battle of the Belts XII, which was taped on October 17, 2024 (aired October 19). This was a standard tag team match in which The Don Callis Family (Brian Cage and Lance Archer) defeated Jon Cruz and Jack Cartwheel. This episode also saw the first defense of the AEW Continental Championship at Battle of the Belts.

In October 2024, AEW announced a new media rights deal with Warner Bros. Discovery, which took effect on January 1, 2025; however, Battle of the Belts was not included in the new deal. While there was no confirmation on the future of the series, the Wrestling Observer Newsletter reported that AEW could potentially shop it to other networks, but as of January 1, 2025, the series has not been renewed.

== Events ==
Event	Date	City	Venue	Main Event	Ref
Battle of the Belts I	January 8, 2022	Charlotte, North Carolina	Bojangles Coliseum	Dr. Britt Baker, D.M.D. (c) vs. Riho for the AEW Women's World Championship	
Battle of the Belts II	April 15, 2022 (aired April 16)	Garland, Texas	Curtis Culwell Center	Thunder Rosa (c) vs. Nyla Rose for the AEW Women's World Championship	
Battle of the Belts III	August 5, 2022 (aired August 6)	Grand Rapids, Michigan	Van Andel Arena	Claudio Castagnoli (c) vs. Konosuke Takeshita for the ROH World Championship	
Battle of the Belts IV	October 7, 2022	Washington, D.C.	Entertainment and Sports Arena	FTR (Cash Wheeler and Dax Harwood) (c) vs. Gates of Agony (Toa Liona and Kaun) for the ROH World Tag Team Championship	
Battle of the Belts V	January 6, 2023	Portland, Oregon	Veterans Memorial Coliseum	Orange Cassidy (c) vs. Kip Sabian for the AEW All-Atlantic Championship	
Battle of the Belts VI	April 7, 2023	Kingston, Rhode Island	Ryan Center	The Lucha Brothers (Penta El Zero Miedo and Rey Fenix) (c) vs. Q. T. Marshall and Powerhouse Hobbs for the ROH World Tag Team Championship	
Battle of the Belts VII	July 15, 2023	Calgary, Alberta, Canada	Scotiabank Saddledome	Luchasaurus (c) vs. Shawn Spears for the AEW TNT Championship	
Battle of the Belts VIII	October 21, 2023	Memphis, Tennessee	FedExForum	The Acclaimed (Anthony Bowens and Max Caster) and Billy Gunn (c) vs. Matt Menard, Angelo Parker, and Daniel Garcia for the AEW World Trios Championship	
Battle of the Belts IX	January 13, 2024	Norfolk, Virginia	Chartway Arena	Orange Cassidy (c) vs. Preston Vance for the AEW International Championship	
Battle of the Belts X	April 13, 2024	Highland Heights, Kentucky	Truist Arena	Athena (c) vs. Red Velvet for the ROH Women's World Championship	
Battle of the Belts XI	July 27, 2024	Arlington, Texas	Esports Stadium Arlington	Dustin Rhodes and The Von Erichs (Marshall Von Erich and Ross Von Erich) vs. The Undisputed Kingdom (Roderick Strong, Matt Taven, and Mike Bennett) for the vacant ROH World Six-Man Tag Team Championship	
Battle of the Belts XII	October 17, 2024 (aired October 19)	Stockton, California	Adventist Health Arena	Mariah May (c) vs. Anna Jay in an AEW Women's World Championship Eliminator match	
(c) – refers to the champion(s) heading into the match

== Results ==
=== Battle of the Belts I ===
Battle of the Belts I
- Promotion: All Elite Wrestling
- Date: January 8, 2022
- City: Charlotte, North Carolina
- Venue: Bojangles Coliseum
- Attendance: 5,601
- Tagline: Saturday Fight Night

Battle of the Belts chronology
← Previous; First	Next → II

Battle of the Belts I took place on Saturday, January 8, 2022, at the Bojangles Coliseum in Charlotte, North Carolina. The event aired live at 8:00 p.m. ET on TNT. In the main event, Dr. Britt Baker, D.M.D. defeated Riho to retain the AEW Women's World Championship. On the undercard, Ricky Starks defeated Matt Sydal to retain the FTW Championship, and in the opening bout, Sammy Guevara defeated Dustin Rhodes to become the interim AEW TNT Champion; Guevara was originally scheduled to face lineal champion Cody Rhodes for the title, however, Cody was pulled due to COVID-19-related issues.

No.	Results	Stipulations	Times
1	Sammy Guevara defeated Dustin Rhodes (with Arn Anderson) by pinfall	Singles match for the interim AEW TNT Championship	16:15
2	Ricky Starks (c) (with Powerhouse Hobbs) defeated Matt Sydal by pinfall	Singles match for the FTW Championship	9:00
3	Dr. Britt Baker, D.M.D. (c) (with Rebel and Jamie Hayter) defeated Riho by submission	Singles match for the AEW Women's World Championship	12:47
(c) / – the champion(s) heading into the match

=== Battle of the Belts II ===
Battle of the Belts II
- Promotion: All Elite Wrestling
- Date: April 15, 2022 (aired April 16, 2022)
- City: Garland, Texas
- Venue: Curtis Culwell Center
- Attendance: 4,775
- Tagline: Saturday Fight Night

Battle of the Belts chronology
← Previous; I	Next → III

Battle of the Belts II was taped on Friday, April 15, 2022, at the Curtis Culwell Center in Garland, Texas. It aired on tape delay the next day on Saturday, April 16 at 8:00 p.m. ET on TNT. In the main event, Thunder Rosa retained the AEW Women's World Championship against Nyla Rose. On the undercard, Jonathan Gresham defeated Dalton Castle to retain the ROH World Championship, which was the first time that an ROH championship was defended at Battle of the Belts, and in the opening bout, Sammy Guevara defeated Scorpio Sky to win the AEW TNT Championship for a record-tying third time.

No.	Results	Stipulations	Times
1	Sammy Guevara (with Tay Conti) defeated Scorpio Sky (c) (with Dan Lambert and Ethan Page) by pinfall	Singles match for the AEW TNT Championship	12:45
2	Jonathan Gresham (c) defeated Dalton Castle by submission	Singles match for the ROH World Championship	10:35
3	Thunder Rosa (c) defeated Nyla Rose by pinfall	Singles match for the AEW Women's World Championship	14:10
(c) / – the champion(s) heading into the match

=== Battle of the Belts III ===
Battle of the Belts III
- Promotion: All Elite Wrestling
- Date: August 5, 2022 (aired August 6, 2022)
- City: Grand Rapids, Michigan
- Venue: Van Andel Arena
- Attendance: 5,955
- Tagline: Saturday Fight Night

Battle of the Belts chronology
← Previous; II	Next → IV

Battle of the Belts III was taped on Friday, August 5, 2022, at the Van Andel Arena in Grand Rapids, Michigan. It aired on tape delay the next day on Saturday, August 6 at 8:00 p.m. ET on TNT. In the main event, Claudio Castagnoli retained the ROH World Championship against Konosuke Takeshita. On the undercard, Thunder Rosa defeated Jamie Hayter to retain the AEW Women's World Championship, and in the opening bout, Wardlow defeated Jay Lethal to retain the AEW TNT Championship.

No.	Results	Stipulations	Times
1	Wardlow (c) defeated Jay Lethal (with Sonjay Dutt and Satnam Singh) by pinfall	Singles match for the AEW TNT Championship	7:21
2	Thunder Rosa (c) (with Toni Storm) defeated Jamie Hayter (with Dr. Britt Baker, D.M.D. and Rebel) by pinfall	Singles match for the AEW Women's World Championship	11:31
3	Claudio Castagnoli (c) (with William Regal) defeated Konosuke Takeshita by pinfall	Singles match for the ROH World Championship	19:59
(c) / – the champion(s) heading into the match

=== Battle of the Belts IV ===
Battle of the Belts IV
- Promotion: All Elite Wrestling
- Date: October 7, 2022
- City: Washington, D.C.
- Venue: Entertainment and Sports Arena
- Attendance: 2,342
- Tagline: Friday Fight Night

Battle of the Belts chronology
← Previous; III	Next → V

Battle of the Belts IV took place on Friday, October 7, 2022, at the Entertainment and Sports Arena in Washington, D.C. As Battle of the Belts was established as a Saturday night television special, it was expected that Battle of the Belts IV would air on tape delay the next day on October 8; however, to avoid counter programming against WWE's Extreme Rules pay-per-view and livestreaming event that night, Battle of the Belts IV was scheduled to air live on October 7 at 11:00 p.m. ET on TNT immediately after the live broadcast of AEW's regular Friday program, Rampage. In the main event, FTR (Cash Wheeler and Dax Harwood) defeated Gates of Agony (Toa Liona and Kaun) to retain the ROH World Tag Team Championship. On the undercard, Jade Cargill defeated Willow Nightingale to retain the AEW TBS Championship, and in the opening bout, Pac defeated Trent Beretta to retain the AEW All-Atlantic Championship. This was the first time that these championships were defended on a Battle of the Belts special.

No.	Results	Stipulations	Times
1	Pac (c) defeated Trent Beretta by pinfall	Singles match for the AEW All-Atlantic Championship	14:25
2	Jade Cargill (c) defeated Willow Nightingale by pinfall	Singles match for the AEW TBS Championship	7:30
3	FTR (Cash Wheeler and Dax Harwood) (c) defeated Gates of Agony (Toa Liona and Kaun) by pinfall	Tag team match for the ROH World Tag Team Championship	13:26
(c) / – the champion(s) heading into the match

=== Battle of the Belts V ===
Battle of the Belts V
- Promotion: All Elite Wrestling
- Date: January 6, 2023
- City: Portland, Oregon
- Venue: Veterans Memorial Coliseum
- Attendance: 5,083
- Tagline: Friday Fight Night

Battle of the Belts chronology
← Previous; IV	Next → VI

Battle of the Belts V took place on Friday, January 6, 2023, at the Veterans Memorial Coliseum in Portland, Oregon. The show aired live at 11:00 p.m. ET on TNT immediately following the live broadcast of AEW's regular Friday program, Rampage. In the main event, Orange Cassidy defeated Kip Sabian to retain the AEW All-Atlantic Championship. On the undercard, Jade Cargill defeated Skye Blue to retain the AEW TBS Championship, and in the opening bout, The Acclaimed (Anthony Bowens and Max Caster) defeated Jeff Jarrett and Jay Lethal in a No Holds Barred tag team match to retain the AEW World Tag Team Championship, which was the first time for the title to be defended at Battle of the Belts.

No.	Results	Stipulations	Times
1	The Acclaimed (Anthony Bowens and Max Caster) (c) defeated Jeff Jarrett and Jay Lethal by pinfall	No Holds Barred tag team match for the AEW World Tag Team Championship	10:52
2	Jade Cargill (c) defeated Skye Blue by pinfall	Singles match for the AEW TBS Championship	9:13
3	Orange Cassidy (c) defeated Kip Sabian by pinfall	Singles match for the AEW All-Atlantic Championship	16:44
(c) / – the champion(s) heading into the match

=== Battle of the Belts VI ===
Battle of the Belts VI
- Promotion: All Elite Wrestling
- Date: April 7, 2023
- City: Kingston, Rhode Island
- Venue: Ryan Center
- Attendance: 2,743

Battle of the Belts chronology
← Previous; V	Next → VII

Battle of the Belts VI took place on Friday, April 7, 2023, at the Ryan Center in Kingston, Rhode Island. The show aired live at 11:00 p.m. ET on TNT immediately following the live broadcast of AEW's regular Friday program, Rampage. In the main event, The Lucha Brothers (Penta El Zero Miedo and Rey Fénix) defeated Q. T. Marshall and Powerhouse Hobbs to retain the ROH World Tag Team Championship. On the undercard, Jade Cargill defeated Billie Starkz to retain the AEW TBS Championship, and in the opening bout, Orange Cassidy defeated Dralístico to retain the AEW International Championship (formerly All-Atlantic Championship).

No.	Results	Stipulations	Times
1	Orange Cassidy (c) (with Chuck Taylor and Trent Beretta) defeated Dralístico (with José the Assistant, Preston Vance, and Rush) by pinfall	Singles match for the AEW International Championship	10:47
2	Jade Cargill (c) defeated Billie Starkz by pinfall	Singles match for the AEW TBS Championship	8:34
3	The Lucha Brothers (Penta El Zero Miedo and Rey Fenix) (c) (with Alex Abrahantes) defeated Q. T. Marshall and Powerhouse Hobbs (with Aaron Solo and Harley Cameron) by pinfall	Tag team match for the ROH World Tag Team Championship	14:41
(c) / – the champion(s) heading into the match

=== Battle of the Belts VII ===
Battle of the Belts VII
- Promotion: All Elite Wrestling
- Date: July 15, 2023
- City: Calgary, Alberta, Canada
- Venue: Scotiabank Saddledome
- Attendance: 5,896

Battle of the Belts chronology
← Previous; VI	Next → VIII

Battle of the Belts VII took place on Saturday, July 15, 2023, at the Scotiabank Saddledome in Calgary, Alberta, Canada, marking the first Battle of the Belts to be held outside of the United States. This episode returned the special to Saturday nights and aired live at 10:00 p.m. ET on TNT immediately after the live broadcast of AEW's regular Saturday program, Collision. In the main event, Luchasaurus defeated Shawn Spears to retain the AEW TNT Championship. On the undercard, Toni Storm defeated Taya Valkyrie to retain the AEW Women's World Championship, and in the opening bout, Orange Cassidy defeated Lance Archer to retain the AEW International Championship. Due to inclement weather that caused satellite issues in Calgary, the conclusion of the Women's World Championship match was not broadcast. After the signal was restored, the announcers informed the television audience of the result, and showed a replay of the finish.

No.	Results	Stipulations	Times
1	Orange Cassidy (c) defeated Lance Archer (with Jake "The Snake" Roberts) by countout	Singles match for the AEW International Championship	10:20
2	Toni Storm (c) (with Ruby Soho) defeated Taya Valkyrie by pinfall	Singles match for the AEW Women's World Championship	11:15
3	Luchasaurus (c) (with Christian Cage) defeated Shawn Spears by pinfall	Singles match for the AEW TNT Championship	9:15
(c) / – the champion(s) heading into the match

=== Battle of the Belts VIII ===
Battle of the Belts VIII
- Promotion: All Elite Wrestling
- Date: October 21, 2023
- City: Memphis, Tennessee
- Venue: FedExForum
- Attendance: 2,933

Battle of the Belts chronology
← Previous; VII	Next → IX

Battle of the Belts VIII took place on Saturday, October 21, 2023, at the FedExForum in Memphis, Tennessee. The show aired live at 10:00 p.m. ET on TNT immediately after the live broadcast of AEW's regular Saturday program, Collision. While all past Battle of the Belts episodes featured three matches per card, Battle of the Belts VIII had four matches. In the main event, The Acclaimed (Anthony Bowens and Max Caster) and Billy Gunn defeated Matt Menard, Angelo Parker, and Daniel Garcia to retain the AEW World Trios Championship. On the undercard, Kris Statlander defeated Willow Nightingale to retain the AEW TBS Championship, Samoa Joe defeated Tony Nese to retain the ROH World Television Championship, and in the opening bout, Orange Cassidy defeated John Silver to retain the AEW International Championship. This was the first time that the AEW World Trios Championship and ROH World Television Championship were defended at Battle of the Belts.

No.	Results	Stipulations	Times
1	Orange Cassidy (c) defeated John Silver (with Alex Reynolds) by pinfall	Singles match for the AEW International Championship	9:31
2	Samoa Joe (c) defeated Tony Nese (with "Smart" Mark Sterling) by pinfall	Singles match for the ROH World Television Championship	1:17
3	Kris Statlander (c) defeated Willow Nightingale by pinfall	Singles match for the AEW TBS Championship	10:21
4	Billy Gunn and The Acclaimed (Anthony Bowens and Max Caster) (c) defeated Daniel Garcia, Matt Menard, and Angelo Parker (with Anna Jay) by pinfall	Six-man tag team match for the AEW World Trios Championship	10:44
(c) / – the champion(s) heading into the match

=== Battle of the Belts IX ===
Battle of the Belts IX
- Promotion: All Elite Wrestling
- Date: January 13, 2024
- City: Norfolk, Virginia
- Venue: Chartway Arena
- Attendance: 3,125

Battle of the Belts chronology
← Previous; VIII	Next → X

Battle of the Belts IX took place on Saturday, January 13, 2024, at the Chartway Arena in Norfolk, Virginia. The show aired live at 10:00 p.m. ET on TNT immediately after the live broadcast of AEW's regular Saturday program, Collision. In the main event, Orange Cassidy defeated Preston Vance to retain the AEW International Championship. On the undercard, Julia Hart defeated Anna Jay to retain the AEW TBS Championship, and in the opening bout, Ricky Starks and Big Bill defeated Le Sex Gods (Chris Jericho and Sammy Guevara) in a Street Fight to retain the AEW World Tag Team Championship.

No.	Results	Stipulations	Times
1	Ricky Starks and Big Bill (c) defeated Le Sex Gods (Chris Jericho and Sammy Guevara) by pinfall	Street Fight for the AEW World Tag Team Championship	18:15
2	Julia Hart (c) defeated Anna Jay by submission	Singles match for the AEW TBS Championship	10:16
3	Orange Cassidy (c) defeated Preston Vance by pinfall	Singles match for the AEW International Championship	11:17
(c) / – the champion(s) heading into the match

=== Battle of the Belts X ===
Battle of the Belts X
- Promotion: All Elite Wrestling
- Date: April 13, 2024
- City: Highland Heights, Kentucky
- Venue: Truist Arena
- Attendance: 2,625

Battle of the Belts chronology
← Previous; IX	Next → XI

Battle of the Belts X took place on Saturday, April 13, 2024, at the Truist Arena in Highland Heights, Kentucky. The show aired live at 10:00 p.m. ET on TNT immediately after the live broadcast of AEW's regular Saturday program, Collision. In the main event, Athena defeated Red Velvet to retain the ROH Women's World Championship. On the undercard, AEW International Champion Roderick Strong defeated Rocky Romero in a Championship Eliminator match, thus Romero could not challenge Strong for the title for as long as Strong was champion, while in the opening bout, Hook defeated Shane Taylor in an FTW Rules match to retain the FTW Championship. This was the first time that the ROH Women's World Championship was defended at Battle of the Belts. It was also the first time that a Championship Eliminator match was contested at Battle of the Belts, subsequently being the first non-title match on the show.

No.	Results	Stipulations	Times
1	Hook (c) defeated Shane Taylor by referee stoppage	FTW Rules match for the FTW Championship	10:25
2	Roderick Strong (c) (with Wardlow, Matt Taven, and Mike Bennett) defeated Rocky Romero by pinfall	AEW International Championship Eliminator match Since Romero lost, he could no longer challenge Strong for as long as Strong was champion. Had Romero won, he would have received a future match for the title.	11:40
3	Athena (c) (with Billie Starkz) defeated Red Velvet by pinfall	Singles match for the ROH Women's World Championship	12:40
(c) / – the champion(s) heading into the match

=== Battle of the Belts XI ===
Battle of the Belts XI
- Promotion: All Elite Wrestling
- Date: July 27, 2024
- City: Arlington, Texas
- Venue: Esports Stadium Arlington
- Attendance: 1,333

Battle of the Belts chronology
← Previous; X	Next → XII

Battle of the Belts XI took place on Saturday, July 27, 2024, at the Esports Stadium Arlington in Arlington, Texas. The show aired live at 10:00 p.m. ET on TNT immediately after the live broadcast of AEW's regular Saturday program, Collision. In the main event, Dustin Rhodes and The Von Erichs (Marshall Von Erich and Ross Von Erich) defeated The Undisputed Kingdom (Roderick Strong, Matt Taven, and Mike Bennett) to win the vacant ROH World Six-Man Tag Team Championship, which was the first time for the title to be contested at Battle of the Belts. On the undercard, CMLL Women's World Champion Willow Nightingale defeated Deonna Purrazzo in a Championship Eliminator match, while in the opening bout, AEW Women's World Champion "Timeless" Toni Storm defeated Taya Valkyrie, also in a Championship Eliminator; as a result of both Championship Eliminators, Purrazzo and Valkyrie could not challenge for those respective titles for as long as Nightingale and Storm held their respective championships. This was subsequently the first and only time that a CMLL title was featured at Battle of the Belts.

No.	Results	Stipulations	Times
1	"Timeless" Toni Storm (c) defeated Taya Valkyrie by pinfall	AEW Women's World Championship Eliminator match Since Valkyrie lost, she could no longer challenge Storm for as long as Storm was champion. Had Valkyrie won, she would have received a future match for the title.	9:10
2	Willow Nightingale (c) defeated Deonna Purrazzo by pinfall	CMLL Women's World Championship Eliminator match Since Purrazzo lost, she could no longer challenge Nightingale for as long as Nightingale was champion. Had Purrazzo won, she would have received a future match for the title.	11:30
3	The Sons of Texas (Dustin Rhodes, Marshall Von Erich, and Ross Von Erich) (with Kevin Von Erich) defeated The Undisputed Kingdom (Roderick Strong, Matt Taven, and Mike Bennett) by pinfall	Trios match for the vacant ROH World Six-Man Tag Team Championship	13:30
(c) / – the champion(s) heading into the match

=== Battle of the Belts XII ===
Battle of the Belts XII
- Promotion: All Elite Wrestling
- Date: October 17, 2024 (aired October 19, 2024)
- City: Stockton, California
- Venue: Adventist Health Arena
- Attendance: 2,360

Battle of the Belts chronology
← Previous; XI	Next → Final

Battle of the Belts XII was taped on Thursday, October 17, 2024, at the Adventist Health Arena in Stockton, California. AEW's regular Saturday program, Collision, was also taped that night with both subsequently airing on tape delay on Saturday, October 19; Battle of the Belts XII aired at 10:00 p.m. ET on TNT immediately after Collision's broadcast. In the main event, Anna Jay defeated AEW Women's World Champion Mariah May in a Championship Eliminator match, thus Jay received a title match on the November 2 episode of Collision; had Jay lost, she would have not been able to challenge for the title for as long as May was champion. On the undercard, The Don Callis Family (Brian Cage and Lance Archer) defeated Jack Cartwheel and Jon Cruz in what was the first match in Battle of the Belts history to be a non-title bout, and in the opening bout, Kazuchika Okada defeated Kyle O'Reilly to retain the AEW Continental Championship, which was the first time for that title to be defended at Battle of the Belts. This would be the final Battle of the Belts special as the program was not included in AEW's media rights deal with Warner Bros. Discovery that took effect on January 1, 2025.

No.	Results	Stipulations	Times
1	Kazuchika Okada (c) defeated Kyle O'Reilly by pinfall	Singles match for the AEW Continental Championship	18:50
2	The Don Callis Family (Brian Cage and Lance Archer) defeated Jack Cartwheel and Jon Cruz by pinfall	Tag team match	2:40
3	Anna Jay defeated Mariah May (c) by pinfall	AEW Women's World Championship Eliminator match Since Jay won, she received a title match on the November 2 episode of Collision. Had Jay lost, she would have not been able to challenge for the title for as long as May was champion.	12:10
(c) / – the champion(s) heading into the match

== See also ==
- List of All Elite Wrestling special events
