= Supercard of Honor (2023) =

2023 Ring of Honor professional wrestling event

- Promotional poster featuring various ROH wrestlers
- Promotion: Ring of Honor
- Date: March 31, 2023
- City: Los Angeles, California
- Venue: Galen Center
- Attendance: 4,472

Event chronology
← Previous; Final Battle	Next → Death Before Dishonor

Supercard of Honor chronology
← Previous; XV	Next → 2024

The 2023 Supercard of Honor was a professional wrestling pay-per-view produced by American promotion Ring of Honor (ROH). It was the 16th Supercard of Honor and took place on March 31, 2023, at the Galen Center in Los Angeles, California. Wrestlers from ROH's parent promotion All Elite Wrestling (AEW), and partner promotions New Japan Pro-Wrestling (NJPW) and Lucha Libre AAA Worldwide (AAA) were also featured.

Twelve matches were contested at the event, including four on the Zero Hour pre-show. In the main event, Claudio Castagnoli retained the ROH World Championship against Eddie Kingston. In other prominent matches, Katsuyori Shibata defeated Wheeler Yuta to become the new ROH Pure Champion, The Lucha Brothers became the new ROH World Tag Team Champions after defeating Aussie Open, The Kingdom, Top Flight and La Facción Ingobernable in a Ladder match, Samoa Joe retained the ROH World Television Championship against Mark Briscoe and, in the opening contest, El Hijo del Vikingo defeated Komander to retain the AAA Mega Championship.

== Production ==
Other on-screen personnel
Role:	Name:
Commentators	Ian Riccaboni
Commentators	Caprice Coleman
Commentators	Nigel McGuinness
Ring announcer	Bobby Cruise

=== Background ===
Supercard of Honor is a pay-per-view professional wrestling event annually presented by Ring of Honor (ROH), and primarily takes place during the weekend of WrestleMania - the flagship event of WWE, and considered to be the biggest wrestling event of the year. It has been a yearly tradition since 2006. The shows are sometimes two-day events, traditionally taking place on Friday nights and/or Saturday afternoons, and are held either in or nearby the same city as that year's WrestleMania.

On January 11, 2023, it was announced that Supercard of Honor would take place on March 31 at the Galen Center in Los Angeles, California.

=== Storylines ===
The event featured professional wrestling matches that involved different wrestlers from pre-existing scripted feuds and storylines. Wrestlers portrayed villains, heroes, or less distinguishable characters in scripted events that build tension and culminate in a wrestling match or series of matches. Storylines were produced on ROH's weekly streaming series ROH Honor Club TV on their Honor Club service, as well as the programming of sister promotion All Elite Wrestling; including weekly television series Dynamite and Rampage, supplementary online streaming shows Dark and Elevation, and via promotional videos on both the ROH and AEW YouTube channels.

On December 10, 2022 at Final Battle, The Briscoe Brothers (Jay Briscoe and Mark Briscoe) defeated FTR (Dax Harwood and Cash Wheeler) in a Dog Collar match to win the ROH World Tag Team Championship. However, Jay was killed in a car accident on January 17, 2023. Following various tributes and allowing some time to pass out of respect for Jay, the titles were formally vacated on the March 10 episode of Rampage. Mark would later announce that new champions would be crowned in a "Reach for the Sky" ladder match – named as such for being the name of the Briscoes' entrance music, and as a way to honor Jay – at Supercard of Honor. The Lucha Brothers (Penta El Zero Miedo and Rey Fénix) would be announced as the first team in the match On March 23, the completed field was announced to include Top Flight (Dante Martin and Darius Martin), The Kingdom (Matt Taven and Mike Bennett), Aussie Open (Mark Davis and Kyle Fletcher), and La Facción Ingobernable (Rush and Dralístico).

After Samoa Joe defended the ROH World Television Championship on the March 9 episode of ROH Honor Club TV, he would announce an open challenge for anyone to wrestle him for the title. His challenge would be answered by Mark Briscoe, declaring that winning the title from Joe would be his "destiny," as he had never beaten Joe in a singles match nor has he held a singles championship in ROH. The match would later be made official the next week for Supercard of Honor.

For several weeks across AEW Dark and AEW Dark: Elevation, ROH Women's World Champion Athena would have her post-match attacks constantly be foiled by Yuka Sakazaki. The two would constantly trade blows both in-ring and backstage. They would also meet in tag team action on the January 30 episode of Dark: Elevation, with Sakazaki and Skye Blue defeating Athena and Diamante. On the March 16 ROH Honor Club TV, Athena would challenge Sakazaki to a title match at Supercard of Honor. On the March 30 episode, after Athena defended the title against Emi Sakura, Sakazaki prevented Athena from conducting another post-match assault. Their title match would be made official not long after.

On the March 9 ROH Honor Club TV, after ROH Pure Champion Wheeler Yuta successfully defended his title, he would have an in-ring interview where he lambasted the New Japan Pro-Wrestling LA Dojo, saying that they think they've accomplished something when they hadn't. His claims would be rebuked by dojo graduate Clark Connors, who challenged him to a title match for the following week's episode. There, Yuta retained the title against Connors. Yuta would then again disrespect the LA Dojo, going so far as to call out its head trainer Katsuyori Shibata to face him for the title at Supercard of Honor. That match would be made official on March 27.

Dating back several years, ROH World Champion Claudio Castagnoli and Eddie Kingston would be embroiled in a heated feud on the independent circuit. That heat would carry over to social media and into AEW, where Castagnoli and Kingston would find themselves fighting alongside one another against the Jericho Appreciation Society. At Blood and Guts this past June, Castagnoli would submit Matt Menard to earn the win for his team, although Kingston had Chris Jericho in another submission at the same time, with Kingston believing Castagnoli "stole" the win from him. On the March 2, 2023 episode of ROH Honor Club TV, after Castagnoli retained the ROH World Championship from AR Fox, Kingston would emerge and challenge him for the title. Two weeks later, Kington himself would have a match, during which he poured coffee onto Castagnoli, who was sitting in the front row of the crowd. Three weeks later on March 23, Castagnoli and Kingston would have a sit-down interview with Caprice Coleman, during which a title match would be made official between the two for Supercard of Honor.

== Results ==
No.	Results	Stipulations	Times
1^{P}	Jeff Cobb defeated Tracy Williams by pinfall	Singles match	5:20
2^{P}	Konosuke Takeshita defeated Willie Mack by pinfall	Singles match	9:35
3^{P}	Willow Nightingale defeated Miranda Alize by pinfall	Singles match	7:00
4^{P}	Stu Grayson (with Evil Uno) defeated Slim J (with Ari Daivari and Mark Sterling) by pinfall	Singles match	7:00
5	El Hijo del Vikingo (c) defeated Komander by pinfall	Singles match for the AAA Mega Championship	16:00
6	The Embassy (Brian Cage, Kaun, and Toa Liona) (c) (with Prince Nana) defeated AR Fox, Blake Christian, and Metalik by pinfall	Six-man tag team match for the ROH World Six-Man Tag Team Championship	8:00
7	Athena (c) defeated Yuka Sakazaki by pinfall	Singles match for the ROH Women's World Championship	11:40
8	Samoa Joe (c) defeated Mark Briscoe by submission	Singles match for the ROH World Television Championship	16:30
9	Hiroshi Tanahashi defeated Daniel Garcia by pinfall	Singles match	12:00
10	The Lucha Brothers (Penta El Zero Miedo and Rey Fénix) (with Alex Abrahantes) defeated Top Flight (Dante Martin and Darius Martin), The Kingdom (Matt Taven and Mike Bennett) (with Maria Kanellis-Bennett), Aussie Open (Mark Davis and Kyle Fletcher), and La Facción Ingobernable (Rush and Dralístico) (with José the Assistant)	"Reach for the Sky" ladder match for the vacant ROH World Tag Team Championship	20:20
11	Katsuyori Shibata defeated Wheeler Yuta (c) by pinfall	Pure wrestling rules match for the ROH Pure Championship	13:10
12	Claudio Castagnoli (c) defeated Eddie Kingston by pinfall	Singles match for the ROH World Championship	20:15
(c) / – the champion(s) heading into the match; P / – the match was broadcast on the pre-show

== See also ==
- 2023 in professional wrestling
- List of Ring of Honor pay-per-view events
