= Darius Martin =

American professional wrestler (born 1999)

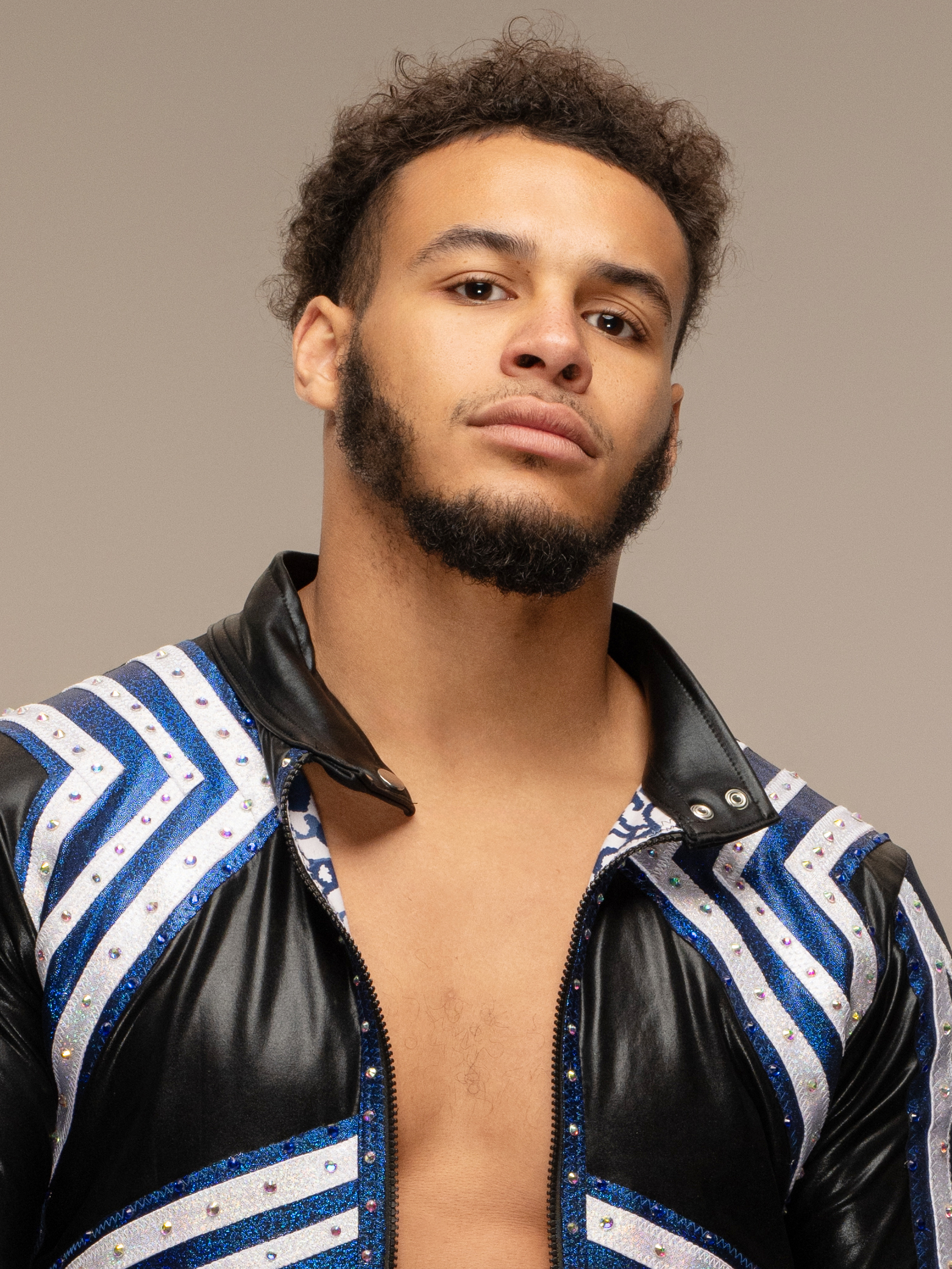
- Martin in 2022

Personal information
- Born: September 20, 1999 (age 27) Minneapolis, Minnesota, U.S.
- Family: Dante Martin (brother)

Professional wrestling career
- Ring names: Air Wolf; Darius Martin
- Billed height: 5 ft 10 in (178 cm)
- Billed weight: 189 lb (86 kg)
- Billed from: Minneapolis, Minnesota
- Trained by: Ken Anderson
- Debut: 2016

Darius Martin (born September 20, 1999) is an American professional wrestler. He is signed to All Elite Wrestling (AEW), where he is a member of SkyFlight and its sub-group Top Flight. He also makes appearances for AEW's sister promotion Ring of Honor (ROH).

== Professional wrestling career ==
=== Early career (2016–2020) ===
Darius Martin along with his brother Dante received his training from The Academy: School of Professional Wrestling in Minnesota by Ken Anderson and they made their professional wrestling debut in 2016 as the tag team "Top Flight".

Prior to AEW, Martin wrestled for Ireland's Over the Top Wrestling, AAW Wrestling based in Illinois, Game Changer Wrestling, and Black Label Pro.

=== All Elite Wrestling / Ring of Honor (2020–present) ===
Top Flight made their All Elite Wrestling (AEW) debut on the October 27, 2020, episode of Dark, losing to Evil Uno and Stu Grayson of the Dark Order. The team signed with AEW on November 23. In February 2021, Darius was sidelined by a torn anterior cruciate ligament, leaving his brother Dante to compete as a singles wrestler.

Darius returned on the March 2, 2022, episode of Dynamite, reuniting with Dante in a Casino Battle Royale. However, he was sidelined again in April after a serious car accident. He returned on the November 16 episode of Dynamite, teaming with Dante and AR Fox in an unsuccessful challenge against Death Triangle for the AEW World Trios Championship. On December 10, Top Flight made their Ring of Honor (ROH) debut at Final Battle, defeating The Kingdom (Matt Taven and Mike Bennett) on the pre-show. Later that month, Top Flight teamed with AR Fox to win the $300,000 Three Kings Christmas Casino Trios Battle Royal on Rampage.

In April 2023, Dante suffered a severe leg injury at Supercard of Honor, leaving Darius to compete without him once again. During his brother's absence, Darius formed an alliance with Action Andretti, and the pair later defeated The Kingdom in a Fight Without Honor on May 18, ending their feud. Dante returned in November 2023, reuniting Top Flight.

In December 2023, Top Flight and Andretti unsuccessfully challenged The Acclaimed and Billy Gunn for the AEW World Trios Championship. In August 2024, the trio competed on the winning team in a 16-man tag team match at All In. In December, Top Flight were defeated by Andretti and Lio Rush at the Collision special Winter Is Coming, following tensions between the two teams.

In July 2025, Top Flight formed an alliance with Christopher Daniels and Scorpio Sky, known as SkyFlight.

== Championships and Accomplishments ==
- All Elite Wrestling
  - Casino Trios Royale (2022) – with AR Fox and Dante Martin
- Canadian Wrestling Elite
  - CWE Canadian Unified Junior Heavyweight Championship (1 time)
- Chikara
  - Rey de Voladores (2018)
- F1RST Wrestling
  - F1RST Wrestling Wrestlepalooza Championship (1 time)
- GALLI Lucha Libre
  - Copa Valadores (2019)
- Glory Pro Resurgence
  - Glory Pro Resurgence Championship (1 time)
- Glory Pro Wrestling
  - United Glory Tag Team Championship (1 time) – with Angel Dorado
  - Gateway to Glory Tournament (2018)
- Heavy on Wrestling
  - HOW Undisputed Championship (2 times)
- Independent Wrestling International
  - IWI Tag Team Championship (1 time) – with Angel Dorado
- Pro Wrestling Battleground
  - PWB Battleground Championship (1 time)
  - PWB Breakout Championship (1 time)
- Pro Wrestling Illustrated
  - Ranked No. 343 of the top 500 singles wrestlers in the PWI 500 in 2021
