= Dante Martin =

American professional wrestler (born 2001)

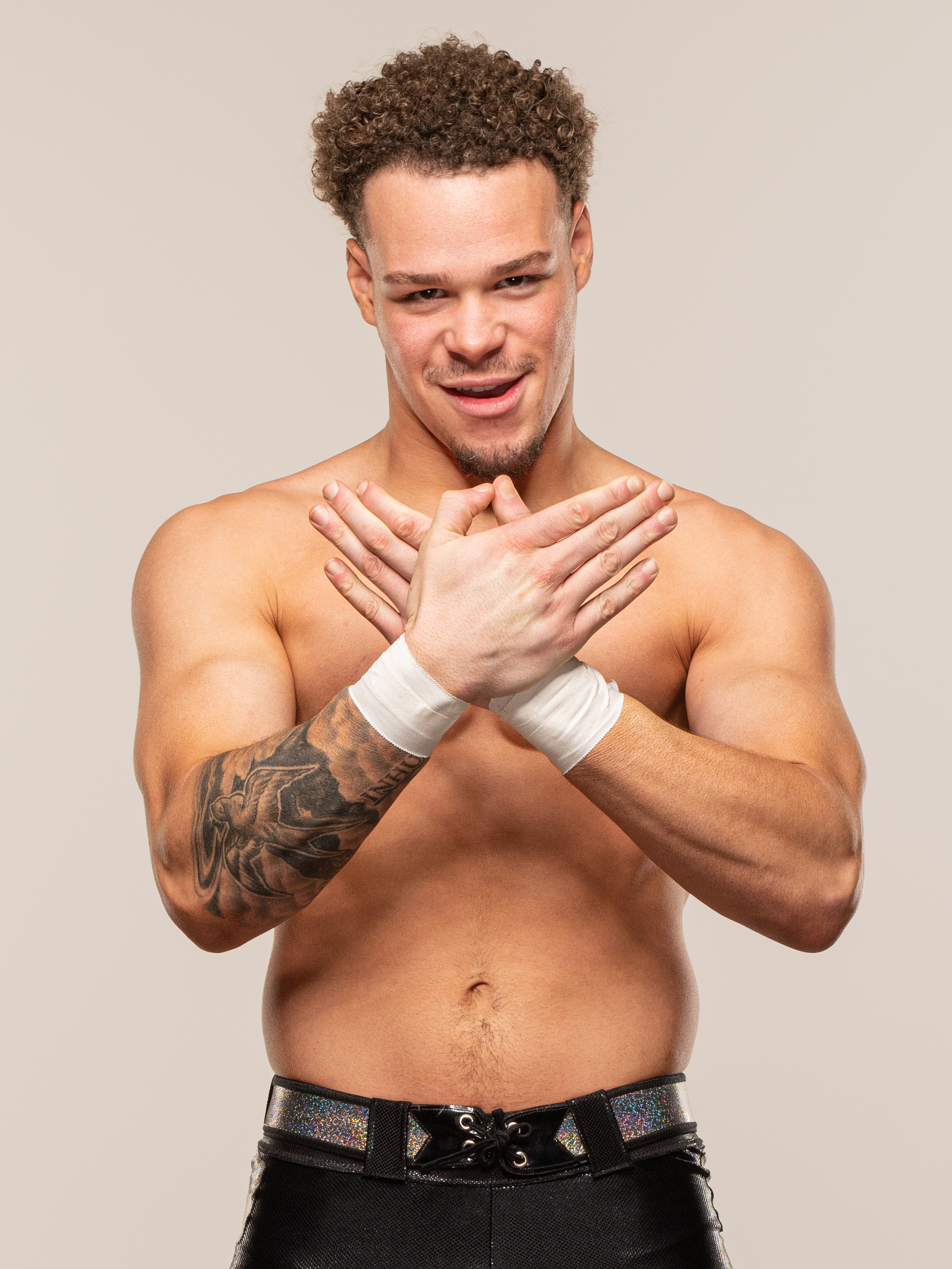
- Martin in 2022

Personal information
- Born: March 3, 2001 (age 25) St. Paul, Minnesota, U.S.
- Family: Darius Martin (brother)

Professional wrestling career
- Ring names: Angel Caido; Angel Dorado; Dante Martin
- Billed height: 5 ft 11 in (180 cm)
- Billed weight: 187 lb (85 kg)
- Billed from: Minneapolis, Minnesota
- Trained by: Ken Anderson
- Debut: 2016

Dante Martin (born March 3, 2001) is an American professional wrestler. He is signed to All Elite Wrestling (AEW) and its sister promotion Ring of Honor (ROH), where he is a member of Sky Flight and its sub-group Top Flight.

== Early life ==
Dante Martin was born on March 3, 2001, in St. Paul, Minnesota. He has an older brother, Darius Martin, who's also a wrestler, signed to All Elite Wrestling (AEW).

== Professional wrestling career ==
=== Early career (2016–2020) ===
Dante Martin, along with his brother Darius, received his training from The Academy: School Of Professional Wrestling in Minnesota by Ken Anderson and they made their professional wrestling debut in 2016 as the tag team "Top Flight".

Prior to AEW, Martin wrestled for Ireland's Over the Top Wrestling, AAW Wrestling based in Illinois, Game Changer Wrestling, Black Label Pro, Revolution Pro Wrestling, Major League Wrestling (MLW), Warrior Wrestling, Republic Of Lucha, DEFY Wrestling and Preston City Wrestling (PCW).

=== All Elite Wrestling / Ring of Honor (2020–present) ===
On the October 27, 2020, episode of AEW Dark, Top Flight made their All Elite Wrestling (AEW) debut, losing to Evil Uno and Stu Grayson of the Dark Order. They later faced The Young Bucks on AEW Dynamite before signing with AEW on November 23.

In February 2021, Darius Martin suffered a torn anterior cruciate ligament (ACL), leaving his brother Dante to compete as a singles wrestler. As a singles competitor, Dante faced prominent AEW wrestlers and briefly forming an alliance with Lio Rush. On the November 24 episode of AEW Dynamite, Dante accepted Taz's offer to join Team Taz, although his membership was part of a scheme with Rush to deceive the group. On December 8, Dante eliminated Team Taz member Ricky Starks from the Dynamite Diamond Battle Royal, securing a place in the final for the Dynamite Diamond Ring and ending his brief association with the group. He subsequently lost to MJF in the final on December 15.

In March 2022, Dante reunited with Darius. On the March 9 episode of Dynamite, Dante challenged Hangman Page for the AEW World Championship. Although he lost, Page endorsed him as a future champion. The reunion was short-lived, as Darius was sidelined by a serious car accident in May, forcing Dante to return to singles competition.

In November 2022, Top Flight reunited and teamed with AR Fox to challenge Death Triangle for the AEW World Trios Championship. The following month, they made their Ring of Honor debuts at Final Battle, defeating The Kingdom, and later won the $300,000 Three Kings Christmas Casino Trios Battle Royal on AEW Rampage alongside Fox. In January 2023, Top Flight defeated The Young Bucks in an upset victory on Dynamite. In April 2023, Dante suffered a severe leg injury at Supercard of Honor, sidelining him until November, when he returned to team with Darius and Action Andretti against the Hardys and Brother Zay.

In 2024, Top Flight and Andretti unsuccessfully challenged The Acclaimed and Billy Gunn for the AEW World Trios Championship. In August, Leila Grey joined Top Flight as their manager. Later that year, tensions developed between Top Flight and Andretti, who allied with Lio Rush. Andretti and Rush defeated Top Flight in a tag team match on the December 14 episode of AEW Collision.

In July 2025, Top Flight formed an alliance with Christopher Daniels and Scorpio Sky, known as Sky Flight.

== Championships and accomplishments ==
- All Elite Wrestling
  - Casino Trios Royale (2022) – with Darius Martin and AR Fox
  - Dynamite Award (1 time)
    - High Flyer Award (2022)
- American Wrestling Federation
  - AWF Championship (1 time)
  - AWF Television Championship (1 time)
  - AWF Television Championship Tournament (2020)
- Canadian Wrestling Elite
  - CWE Canadian Unified Junior Heavyweight Championship (1 time)
- Glory Pro Wrestling
  - United Glory Tag Team Championship (1 time) – with Air Wolf
- Independent Wrestling International
  - IWI Tag Team Championship (1 time) – with Air Wolf
- Pro Wrestling Battleground
  - PWB Breakout Championship (1 time)
- Pro Wrestling Illustrated
  - Ranked No. 127 of the top 500 singles wrestlers in the PWI 500 in 2022
