= Nyla Rose =

American professional wrestler and actress

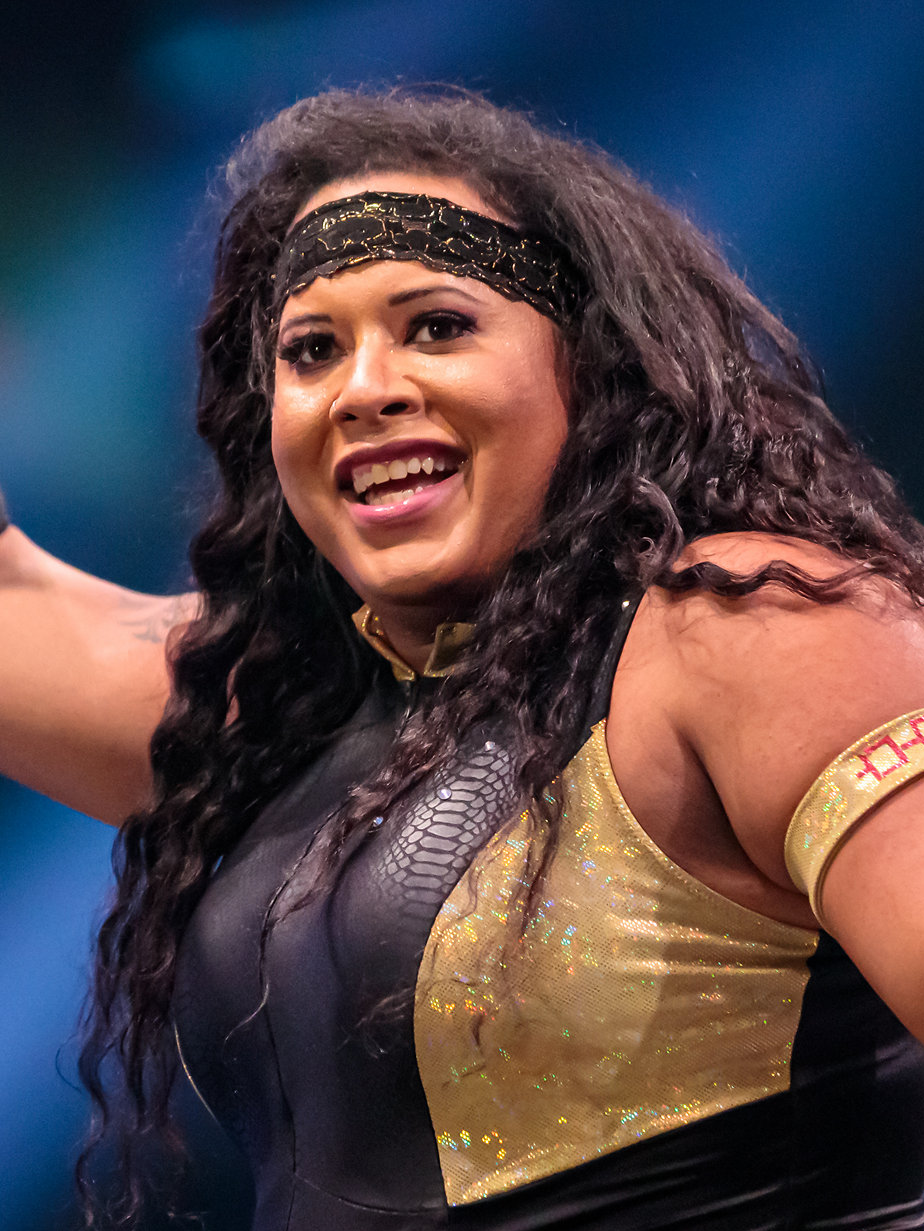
- Rose in 2020

Personal information
- Born: August 3, 1982 (age 44) Washington, D.C., U.S.

Professional wrestling career
- Ring name(s): Debbie Kong; Nyla Rose; Nyla the Destroyer
- Billed height: 5 ft 7 in (170 cm)
- Billed weight: 185 lb (84 kg)
- Billed from: Washington, D.C.
- Trained by: John Kermon; Hype Rockwell; Christian York; Jimmy Z
- Debut: December 8, 2012

Nyla Rose (born August 3, 1982), is an American professional wrestler and actress. She is signed to All Elite Wrestling (AEW), where she is a one-time AEW Women's World Champion.

Upon joining AEW in 2019, Rose became the first openly transgender wrestler to sign with a major American promotion, and her reign as AEW Women's World Champion made her the first transgender wrestler to win a championship in a major American promotion. Outside of wrestling, she played the lead role in the 2016 Canadian comedy series The Switch.

== Early life ==
Rose was born on August 3, 1982, in Washington, D.C. She has African American and Native American (Oneida) ancestry. She grew up watching wrestling with her grandmother. While attending Alexandria City High School (then T. C. Williams), she tried wrestling, but only briefly, as drama club was more appealing at the time. She began transitioning in college.

== Professional wrestling career ==
=== Independent circuit (2013–2019) ===
Rose made her professional wrestling debut at the age of 30 on December 8, 2012, after being trained by John Kermon, Hype Rockwell, Christian York, and Jimmy Z at the KYDA Pro Training School in Morgantown, West Virginia. Until 2019, she wrestled on the American independent circuit for promotions such as Women Superstars Uncensored. She also appeared in Japan with promotions such as Pro Wrestling Zero1 and Sendai Girls' Pro Wrestling.

=== All Elite Wrestling (2019–present) ===
Rose signed with All Elite Wrestling (AEW) in February 2019, becoming the first openly transgender wrestler to sign with a major American professional wrestling promotion. Rose made her AEW debut at the promotion's inaugural event, Double or Nothing. Her scheduled triple threat match against Dr. Britt Baker, D.M.D. and Kylie Rae was turned into a fatal four-way match with the surprise addition of Awesome Kong. Rose lost and was not involved in the decision, after spearing Kong into the ring steps shortly before Baker pinned Rae.

At Fyter Fest, she was involved in a triple threat match with Riho and Yuka Sakazaki; after the match, Rose attacked both women, establishing herself as a heel in the process. Rose took part in the AEW Women's Casino Battle Royal at All Out, which she went on to win, earning the opportunity to compete to become the inaugural AEW Women's World Champion. On the premiere of Dynamite on October 2, Rose was defeated by Riho for the title, and attacked Riho after the match ended. On February 12, 2020, Rose defeated Riho to win the AEW Women's World Championship on Dynamite, becoming the first transgender woman to win a world championship in a major United States wrestling promotion. She successfully defended the title against Kris Statlander at Revolution on February 29. On May 23 at Double or Nothing, Rose lost the title to Hikaru Shida. On July 15, Rose introduced Vickie Guerrero as her manager.

In February 2021, it was announced that Rose would be competing in the AEW Women's World Championship Eliminator Tournament. In the opening round of the U.S. side of the bracket, Rose picked up a victory over Tay Conti, and on the February 24 edition of Dynamite, she picked up a victory over Britt Baker to advance to the tournament U.S. tournament finals. There, Rose defeated Thunder Rosa on March 1. She lost to Ryo Mizunami in the overall tournament finals on the March 3 edition of Dynamite. On July 21 at Fyter Fest Rose faced Britt Baker for the AEW Women's World Championship, which Rose lost by submission. On November 17 episode of Dynamite Rose took part in the AEW Women's TBS championship tournament where she faced Hikaru Shida and defeated her, making Rose advance to the next round. On the December 22 special episode of Dynamite, AEW Holiday Bash, Rose faced Ruby Soho in the semi-finals of the tournament, which Rose lost.

On April 16, 2022, at AEW Battle of The Belts ll, Rose faced Thunder Rosa in the main event of the show for the AEW Women's World Championship, which Rose lost.

In December 2023, Rose faced Alejandra Lion on an episode of Ring of Honor Wrestling, which was taped alongside AEW Holiday Bash at the Paycom Center in Oklahoma City. Because of Oklahoma's laws regarding transgender participation in sport, the state's athletic commission (which still regulates professional wrestling) censured AEW for violating their rules regarding "intergender wrestling". AEW and ROH owner Tony Khan expressed his disappointment with the decision and offered his support to both Rose personally and transgender rights in general, although he did not specify whether AEW would host more events in Oklahoma.

Following news of Oklahoma's censure, Rose commented in a June 2024 interview with Renee Paquette that the overwhelming support from fans and colleagues forced her to turn babyface. Rose went on to challenge Mercedes Moné for the TBS Women's Championship and Mariah May for the AEW Women's World Championship later that year, coming up short in both attempts. Rose then entered an extended hiatus from television, though she continued to work in AEW.

=== Return to independent circuit (2025–present) ===
In 2025, Rose returned to the independent circuit, winning the EVE Title from Nightshade on August 23, 2025. On November 7, Rose lost the title to Rhio. At the debut of T4T Wrestling on July 3, 2026, Rose and Dark Sheik unsuccessfully challenged Gisele Shaw for the NWA World Women’s Television Championship.

== Other ventures ==
In 2016, Rose played the lead character in the Canadian comedy series The Switch. In 2022, she co-wrote the comic Giant-Size X-Men: Thunderbird #1 with Steve Orlando and artist David Cutler.

== Filmography ==
=== Film ===
Year	Title	Role	Notes
2012	Dissensions	Daniel Tanner	

=== Television ===
Year	Title	Role	Notes
2016	Spiros and the Hood	Serena Cox	
2016	The Switch	Sü	6 episodes

== Championships and accomplishments ==
- All Elite Wrestling
  - AEW Women's World Championship (1 time)
  - Women's Casino Battle Royale (2019)
  - Dynamite Award (2 times)
    - Best Twitter Follow (2021, 2022)
- Covey Promotions
  - CP Women's Championship (3 times)
- Marvelous That's Women Pro Wrestling
  - AAAW Tag Team Championship (1 time, current) – with Nightshade
- Misc. Championships
  - WNRN Internet Championship (4 time, current)
- Pandemonium: Pro Wrestling
  - Pandemonium: Pro Wrestling Tag Team Championship (1 time, current) - with Serpentico
- Pro-Wrestling: EVE
  - Pro-Wrestling: EVE Championship (1 time)
- Pro Wrestling Illustrated
  - Ranked No. 16 of the top 100 female wrestlers in the PWI Women's 100 in 2020
- United Pro Wrestling Association
  - UPWA Women's Championship (1 time)
- Warriors Of Wrestling
  - WOW Women's Championship (2 time)
- World Domination Wrestling Alliance
  - WDWA West Virginia Championship (1 time)

Preceded by None (first)	Women's Casino Battle Royale winner 2019	Succeeded by Ruby Soho
Preceded by Riho	2nd AEW Women's World Champion; February 12, 2020 – May 23, 2020	Succeeded by Hikaru Shida
