= Top Flight (professional wrestling) =

- Top Flight: Dante Martin (upper) and Darius Martin (center) at Death Before Dishonor 2026 managed by Christopher Daniels (down)

Statistics
- Members: Dante Martin; Darius Martin; Leila Grey (valet)
- Name(s): Flight Force Elite; Flip Bros; Lucha Extreme; Top Flight
- Billed heights: Dante: 5 ft 11 in (1.80 m); Darius: 6 ft 1 in (1.85 m); Leila: 5 ft 3 in (1.60 m)
- Debut: 2016
- Years active: 2016–present

Top Flight is a professional wrestling stable, consisting of real-life brothers Dante Martin and Darius Martin, with Leila Grey as their valet. They are signed to All Elite Wrestling (AEW) and Ring of Honor (ROH), where they perform as a sub-unit of the SkyFlight stable.

== History ==
=== Training and early careers (2016–2020) ===
Dante Martin, along with his brother Darius, received his training from The Academy: School Of Professional Wrestling in Minnesota by Ken Anderson and they made their professional wrestling debut in 2016 and wrestled under various tag team names such as "Lucha Extreme", "Flight Force Elite", and "Flip Bros", and "Top Flight".

=== All Elite Wrestling / Ring of Honor (2020–present) ===
On the October 27, 2020, episode of AEW Dark, Top Flight made their All Elite Wrestling (AEW) debut, losing to Evil Uno and Stu Grayson of the Dark Order. They later faced The Young Bucks on AEW Dynamite before signing with AEW on November 23.

In February 2021, Darius Martin suffered a torn ACL, leaving his brother Dante to compete as a singles wrestler. After Darius returned in March 2022, Dante challenged Hangman Page for the AEW World Championship on the March 9 episode of Dynamite. Although Dante lost, Page endorsed him as a future champion. Darius was subsequently sidelined again after a serious car accident in May 2022, forcing Dante to return to singles competition.

In December 2022, Top Flight teamed with AR Fox to win the $300,000 Three Kings Christmas Casino Trios Battle Royal on AEW Rampage. The following month, they defeated The Young Bucks in an upset victory on Dynamite. In April 2023, Dante suffered a severe leg injury at Supercard of Honor, temporarily sidelining him.

Dante returned to AEW programming on the November 29, 2023, episode of Dynamite, teaming with Darius and Action Andretti to defeat the Hardys and Brother Zay. In August 2024, Leila Grey joined Top Flight as their manager. Later that year, tensions emerged between Top Flight and Andretti after the former were eliminated by Andretti and Lio Rush from the Dynamite Dozen Battle Royale. Andretti and Rush subsequently defeated Top Flight in a tag team match on the December 14 episode of AEW Collision.

In July 2025, Top Flight formed an alliance with Christopher Daniels and Scorpio Sky, known as Sky Flight.

== Championships and accomplishments ==
- All Elite Wrestling
  - Casino Trios Royale (2022) – with AR Fox
  - Dynamite Award (1 time) – Dante
    - High Flyer Award (2022) – Dante
- American Wrestling Federation
  - AWF Championship (1 time) – Dante
  - AWF Television Championship (1 time) – Dante
  - AWF Television Championship Tournament (2020) – Dante
- Canadian Wrestling Elite
  - CWE Canadian Unified Junior Heavyweight Championship (2 times) – Dante (1) and Darius (1)
- Chikara
  - Rey de Voladores (2018) – Darius
- F1RST Wrestling
  - F1RST Wrestling Wrestlepalooza Championship (1 time) – Darius
- GALLI Lucha Libre
  - Copa Valadores (2019) – Darius
- Glory Pro Resurgence
  - Glory Pro Resurgence Championship (1 time) – Darius
- Glory Pro Wrestling
  - United Glory Tag Team Championship (1 time)
- Independent Wrestling International
  - IWI Tag Team Championship (1 time)
- Pro Wrestling Battleground
  - PWB Breakout Championship (1 time) – Dante
- Pro Wrestling Illustrated
  - Ranked No. 127 of the top 500 singles wrestlers in the PWI 500 in 2022 – Dante
  - Ranked No. 343 of the top 500 singles wrestlers in the PWI 500 in 2021 – Darius
