= AEW Women's World Championship =

Professional wrestling championship

- The current AEW Women's World Championship belt (2022–present)

Details
- Promotion: All Elite Wrestling
- Date established: October 2, 2019
- Current champion: Mercedes Moné
- Date won: August 30, 2026
Statistics
- First champion: Riho
- Most reigns: "Timeless" Toni Storm (4 reigns)
- Longest reign: Hikaru Shida (1st reign, 372 days)
- Shortest reign: Hikaru Shida (2nd reign, 25 days)
- Oldest champion: Nyla Rose (37 years, 193 days)
- Youngest champion: Riho (22 years, 120 days)
- Heaviest champion: Nyla Rose (185 lb (84 kg))
- Lightest champion: Riho (93 lb (42 kg))

The AEW Women's World Championship is a women's professional wrestling world championship created and promoted by the American promotion All Elite Wrestling (AEW). Established on October 2, 2019, the inaugural champion was Riho. The current champion is Mercedes Moné, who is in her first reign. She won the title by defeating Willow Nightingale at All In on August 30, 2026.

== History ==
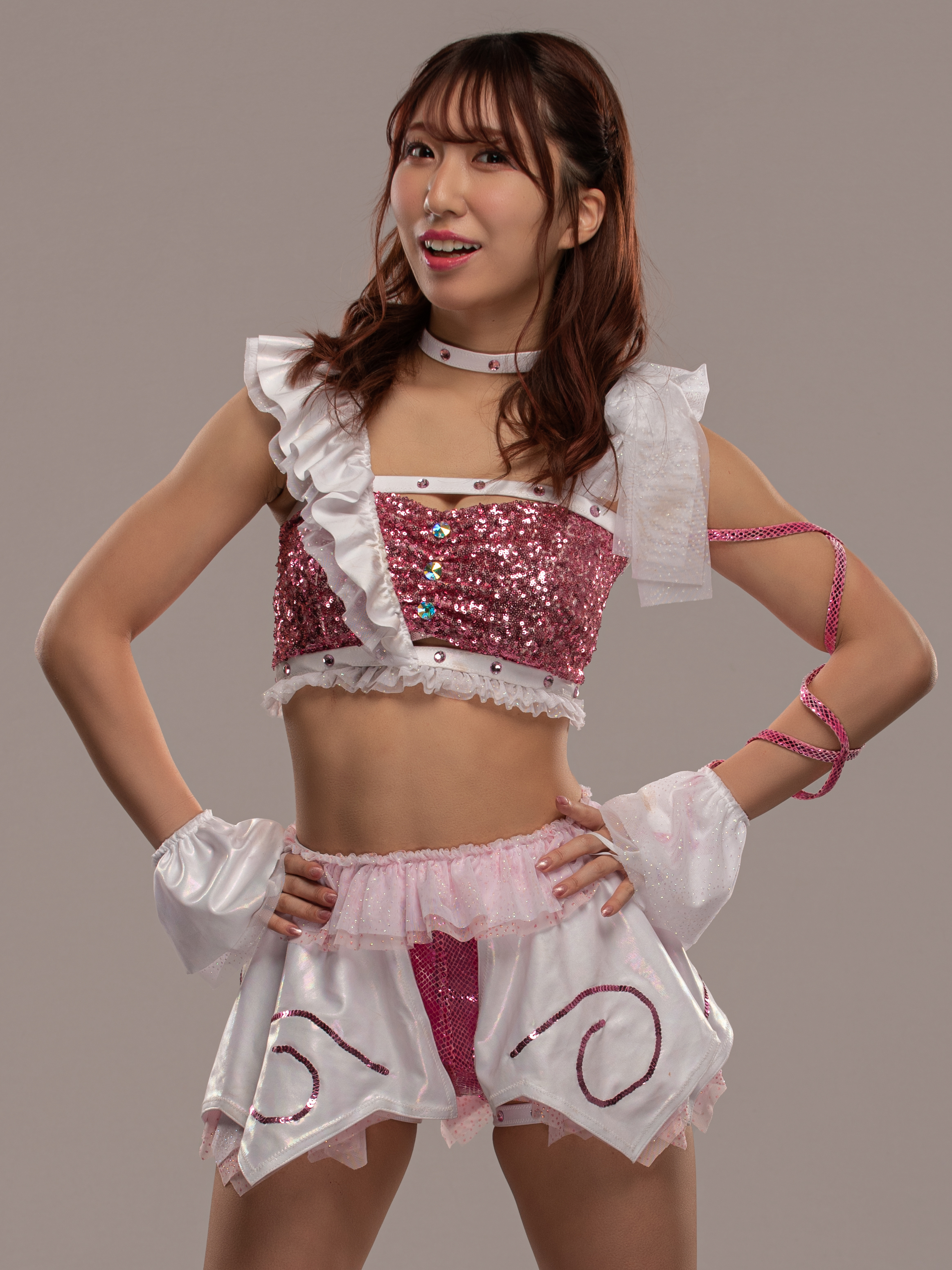
Inaugural champion Riho

On June 18, 2019, six months after the American professional wrestling promotion All Elite Wrestling (AEW) was founded, AEW President and Chief Executive Officer Tony Khan announced plans for both a singles and tag team championship for the women's division. It was then announced by AEW Chief Brand Officer Brandi Rhodes that the AEW Women's World Championship belt would be unveiled on August 31 at All Out, and that the first champion would be crowned on October 2 during the inaugural broadcast of AEW's weekly television show, later revealed as Dynamite.

Both participants for the inaugural championship match were determined at All Out. The first competitor was determined by the women's Casino Battle Royale during the Buy In pre-show, which was won by Nyla Rose. Later that night on the main show, Riho became her opponent by defeating Hikaru Shida. On the premiere episode of Dynamite, Riho defeated Rose to become the inaugural champion.

At All Out on September 4, 2022, reigning champion Thunder Rosa was originally scheduled to defend the championship against Toni Storm; however, due to Rosa suffering a back injury in late August, the match was called off. Instead of vacating the title, it was decided that an interim champion would be crowned until Rosa's return, after which, the interim champion would face Rosa to determine the undisputed champion. A four-way match was scheduled for All Out where Storm defeated Dr. Britt Baker, D.M.D., Jamie Hayter, and Hikaru Shida to become the interim champion. At Full Gear on November 19, Hayter defeated Storm to win the interim championship. However, on the November 23 episode of Dynamite, it was announced that Rosa had relinquished the lineal championship, thus Hayter became the official champion by default and Storm's interim reign was retroactively made an official reign.

== Belt design ==
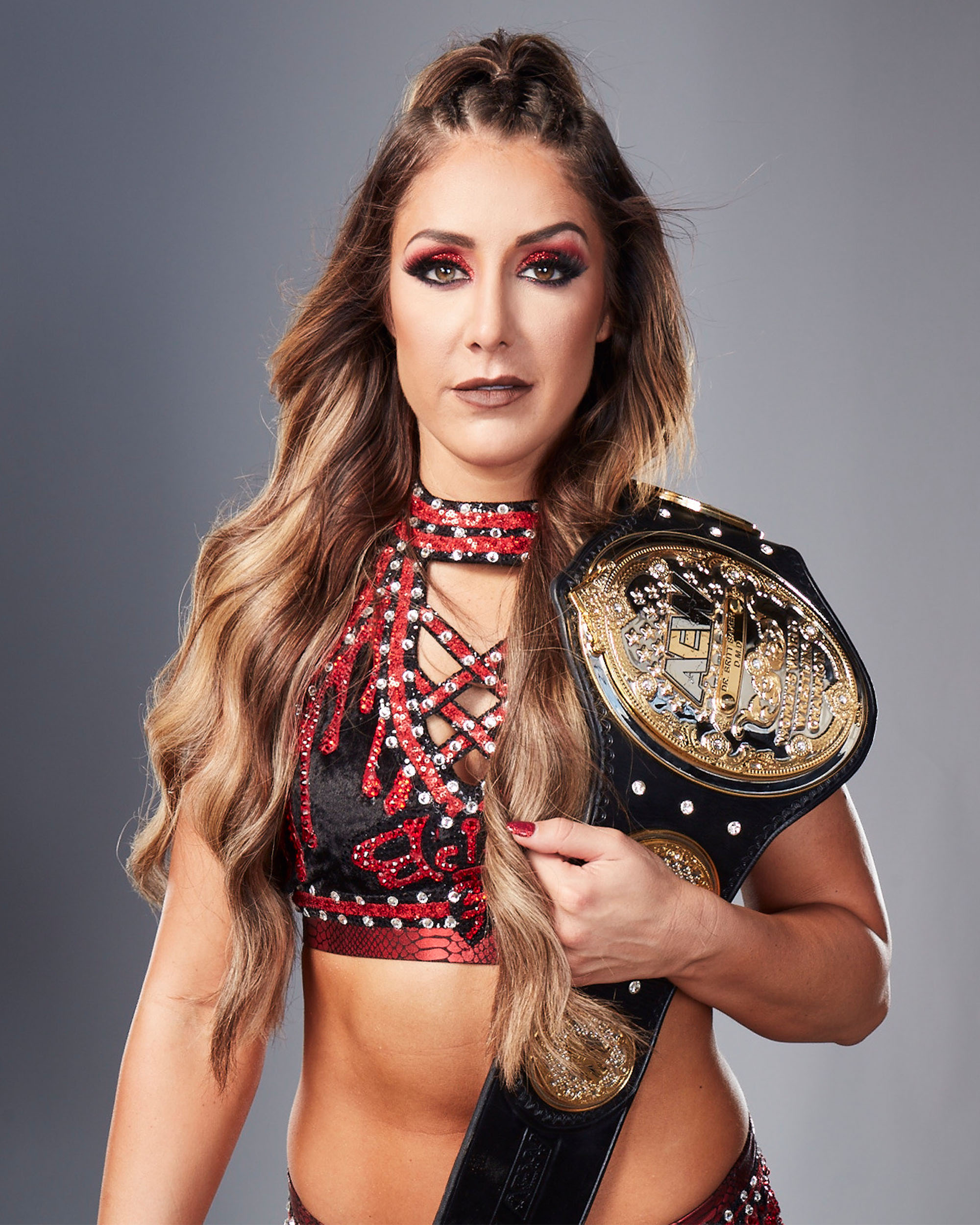
Dr. Britt Baker, D.M.D., with the 2021–2022 version of the championship belt

The original AEW Women's World Championship belt had a small oval shaped center plate. There were a total of six side plates, three on each side of the center plate. The top of the center plate had a crown and ornamentation lined the edge of the center plate. At the very center of the plate was a name plate to display the reigning champion's name. Above the name plate was AEW's logo while below the name plate read "Women's World Wrestling Champion". The side plates had a globe at the center with filigree around the globe. The plates were gold and nickel and were on a black leather strap.

On the May 28, 2021, Friday night special airing of Dynamite, reigning champion Hikaru Shida was awarded with a slightly updated championship belt. The updated belt featured the overall same design, but was slightly bigger with extra encrusted diamonds and extra gold plating, and it only had two side plates on each side of the center plate instead of three. The unveiling of this updated design was to commemorate Shida's reign of 370 days, which at the time was the longest reign for any AEW championship (this record would be broken by Jade Cargill with the AEW TBS Championship in January 2023). Shida, however, would lose the title just two days later at Double or Nothing to Dr. Britt Baker, D.M.D.

At Revolution on March 6, 2022, Baker unveiled a new design of the championship belt with bigger plates, which are gold and on a black strap. At the center of the center plate is a globe that shows the continents of North and South America. Above the globe is a black banner that says "Women's World" while below the globe is another black banner that says "Wrestling Champion". At the top of the center plate is AEW's logo while filigree fills out the rest of the plate. It lacks a nameplate that was on the previous design. The inner side plates each have a portion of the globe that shows continents not on the center plate, while the outer side plates have two wrestlers grappling below the AEW logo. This belt was designed by Andre Dorsey, which took three weeks to complete, and it was inspired by the Mid-South North American Championship belt of the 1980s.

== Reigns ==
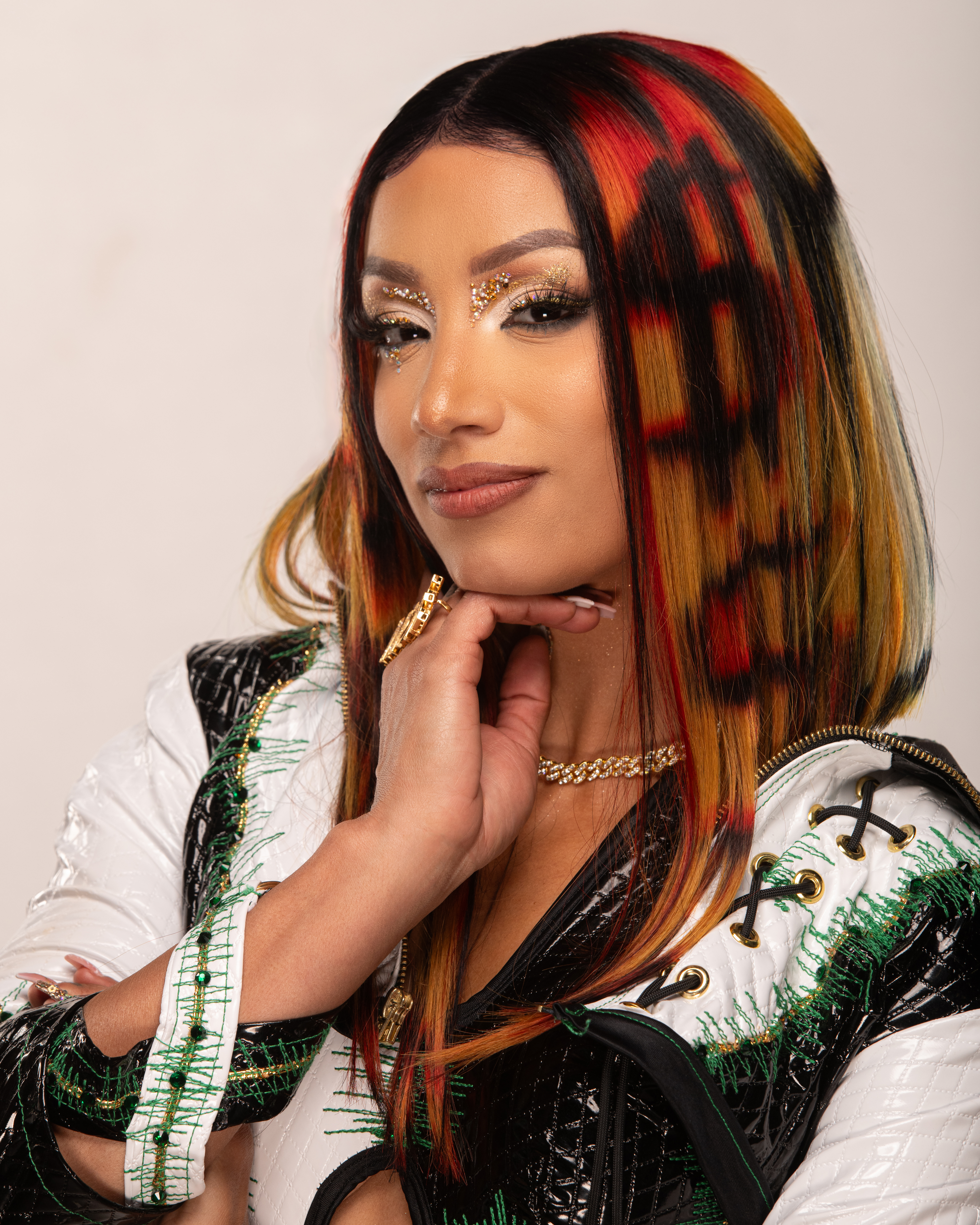
Current champion Mercedes Moné

As of November 20, 2026, there have been 18 reigns between 13 champions and one vacancy. Riho was the inaugural champion. "Timeless" Toni Storm has the most reigns at four, and she has the longest combined reign at 512 days. Hikaru Shida also has the longest and shortest reigns, with her first reign lasting 372 days and her second reign lasting 25 days. Riho was the youngest champion at 22 years old while Nyla Rose is the oldest champion at 37.

The current champion is Mercedes Moné, who is in her first reign. She won the title by defeating Willow Nightingale at All In on August 30, 2026, in London, England.
