= Serpentico =

Puerto Rican professional wrestler (born 1984)

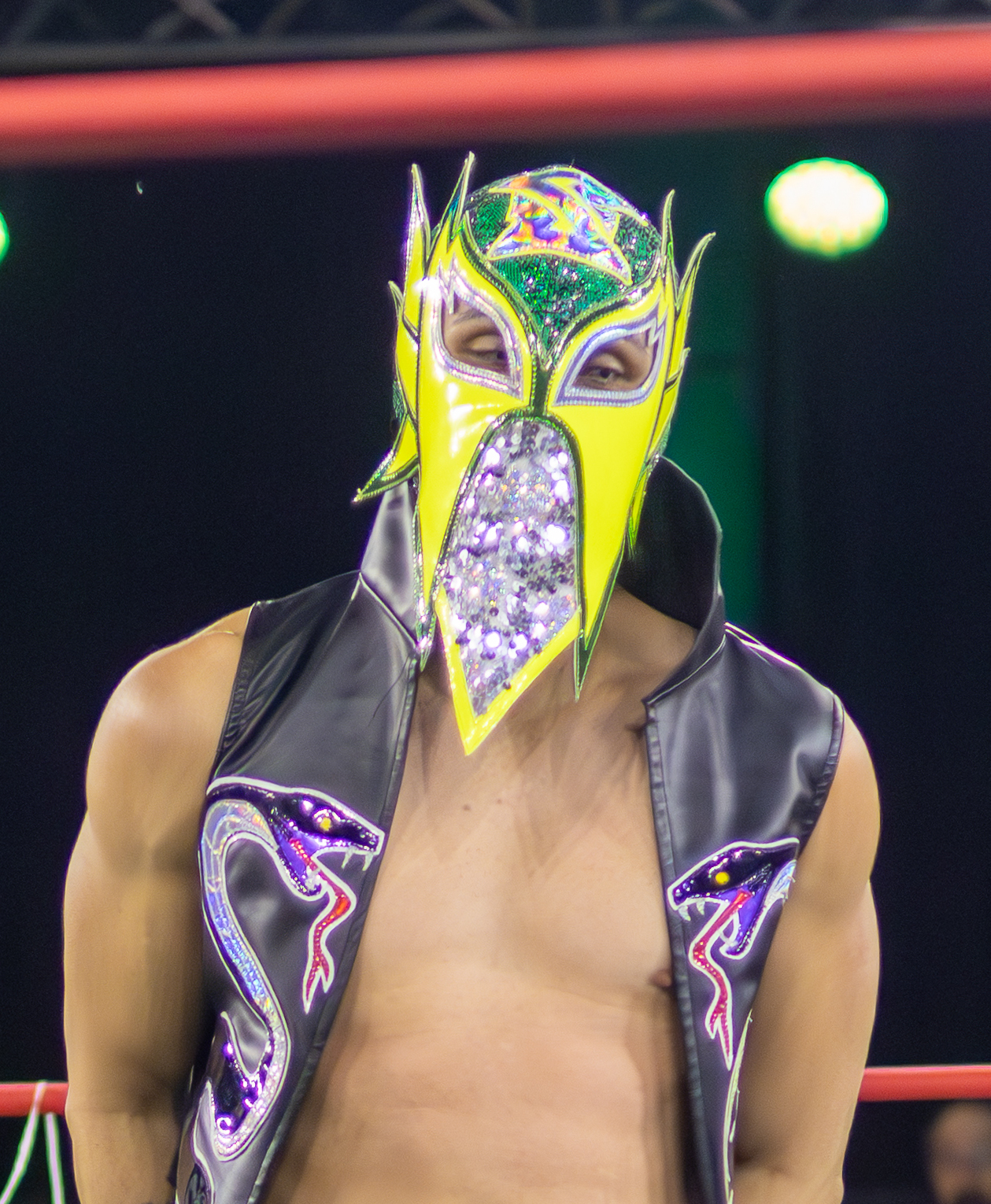
- Serpentico in September 2025

Personal information
- Born: Jonathan Cruz Rivera; February 23, 1984 (age 42) Bayamón, Puerto Rico

Professional wrestling career
- Ring name(s): Ben Dejo; Eddie Cruz; Jay Cruz; Jon Cruz; Jonathan Cruz; Serpentico
- Billed height: 5 ft 6 in (168 cm)
- Billed weight: 174 lb (79 kg)
- Billed from: Bayamón, Puerto Rico
- Trained by: Bubba Ray Dudley; D-Von Dudley
- Debut: 2007

Jonathan Cruz Rivera (born February 23, 1984) is a Puerto Rican professional wrestler. He is signed to the American promotion All Elite Wrestling (AEW) under the ring name Serpentico and occasionally under his real name of Jon Cruz, as well as working for Ring of Honor under the ring name Ben Dejo.

== Professional wrestling career ==
Cruz debuted in professional wrestling in 2007 under the ring name "Ben Dejo". In 2012, he changed his ring name to "Jay Cruz". In 2015, he also began using the ring name "Serpentico".

In 2020, Serpentico began wrestling for All Elite Wrestling. He made his debut on AEW Dark on March 18, 2020, teaming with Matt Sells, in a loss against The Natural Nightmares (Dustin Rhodes and Q. T. Marshall). He would wrestle under various gimmicks, including Jonathan Cruz and Serpentico. On July 2, 2020, Cruz won his first match, teaming with Luther to defeat Brady Pierce & Pineapple Pete. On December 2, 2020, he made his AEW Dynamite debut, participating in the Dynamite Diamond Ring Battle Royal. On the May 27, 2022 episode of AEW Rampage, Cruz would use the ring name Jon Cruz when teaming with Taylor Rust to unsuccessfully challenge The Young Bucks. In April 2023, he began teaming with Angélico as "Spanish Announce Project".

== Championships and accomplishments ==
- Pandemonium: Pro Wrestling
  - Pandemonium: Pro Wrestling Tag Team Championship (1 time, current) - with Nyla Rose
- Pro Wrestling Illustrated
  - PWI ranked him #436 of the top 500 singles wrestlers in the PWI 500 in 2015
