= Death Triangle =

Professional wrestling stable

Stable
- Name: Death Triangle
- Members: Pac; Penta El Zero Miedo; Rey Fénix; Alex Abrahantes (manager)
- Billed heights: Pac: 5 ft 8 in (1.73 m); Penta: 5 ft 11 in (1.80 m); Fénix: 5 ft 9 in (1.75 m)
- Combined billed weight: 564 lb (256 kg)
- Debut: March 4, 2020
- Disbanded: August 25, 2024
- Years active: 2020–2024

The Death Triangle was a professional wrestling stable in All Elite Wrestling (AEW) consisting of Pac and The Lucha Brothers (Penta El Zero Miedo and Rey Fénix), alongside their manager, Alex Abrahantes. The trio are former one-time AEW World Trios Champions. Additionally, since the team's formation in March 2020, The Lucha Brothers became one-time AEW World Tag Team Champions, while Pac and Fénix won the 2021 Casino Tag Team Royale. The Lucha Brothers also appeared for AEW's sister promotion, Ring of Honor (ROH), where they are former ROH World Tag Team Champions.

== History ==
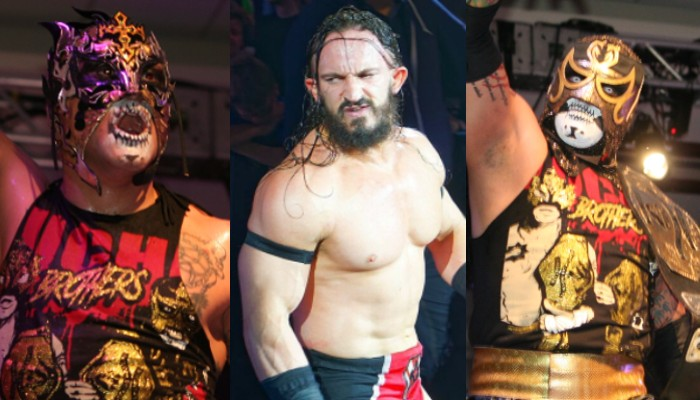
From left to right: Rey Fénix, Pac, and Penta El Zero M

On the March 4, 2020, episode of Dynamite, Pac formed an alliance with the Lucha Brothers, naming themselves Death Triangle after attacking Orange Cassidy, Chuck Taylor, and Trent. Shortly thereafter, Pac became inactive due to COVID-19 travel restrictions, while the Lucha Brothers aligned with Eddie Kingston and his stable. Pac returned to AEW television on the November 11, 2020, episode of Dynamite, confronting Kingston. The following week, Death Triangle reunited after the Lucha Brothers assisted Pac during an attack by Kingston, The Butcher, and The Blade.

At Revolution on March 7, 2021, Pac and Rey Fenix won the Casino Tag Team Royale to earn a future AEW World Tag Team Championship match. On the April 14 episode of Dynamite, they challenged The Young Bucks for the titles but were unsuccessful. At All Out on September 5, the Lucha Brothers, with Alex Abrahantes as their manager, defeated The Young Bucks in a steel cage match to win the AEW World Tag Team Championship. They successfully defended the titles against FTR at Full Gear. On the January 5, 2022, episode of Dynamite, Lucha Brothers lost the championships to Jurassic Express (Jungle Boy and Luchasaurus), ending their reign at 122 days. During the match, Fenix sustained a dislocated elbow.

Following Fenix’s injury, Penta El Zero Miedo adopted the "Penta Oscuro" persona and ring name. At the Revolution pre-show on March 6, Pac, Penta Oscuro, and Erick Redbeard were defeated by the House of Black in a six-man tag team match. Fenix returned on the April 27 episode of Dynamite, disguised as Alex Abrahantes, and assisted Pac and Penta Oscuro in attacking the House of Black. At Double or Nothing on May 29, Death Triangle lost to the House of Black after interference from Julia Hart.

At Forbidden Door on June 26, Pac won a four-way match to become the inaugural AEW All-Atlantic Champion. Death Triangle subsequently entered the tournament to crown the inaugural AEW World Trios Champions but were eliminated in the first round by United Empire (Will Ospreay, Mark Davis, and Kyle Fletcher). After the Trios Championship was vacated, Death Triangle defeated Best Friends (Chuck Taylor, Trent Beretta, and Orange Cassidy) on the September 7 episode of Dynamite to win the vacant titles, making Pac a double champion. They held the championship until January 11, 2023, when they lost them to The Elite (Kenny Omega, and The Young Bucks) in a ladder match that concluded a Best of Seven Series.

After a brief hiatus, Pac returned on the March 6, 2024, episode of Collision, assisting Eddie Kingston and the Lucha Brothers during an attack by The Elite (The Young Bucks, and Kazuchika Okada). On March 13 at Big Business, Pac, Penta El Zero Miedo, and Kingston were defeated by The Elite. At Double or Nothing on May 26, Death Triangle unsuccessfully challenged the Bang Bang Gang (Jay White, Austin Gunn, and Colten Gunn) for both the AEW World Trios Championship and the ROH World Six-Man Tag Team Championship. Following the event, Death Triangle quietly disbanded, with Pac joining Death Riders, while the Lucha Brothers subsequently departed AEW.

== Sub-groups ==
Affiliate	Members	Tenure	Type
The Lucha Brothers	Penta El Zero Miedo; Rey Fenix	2020–2024	Tag team

== Championships and accomplishments ==
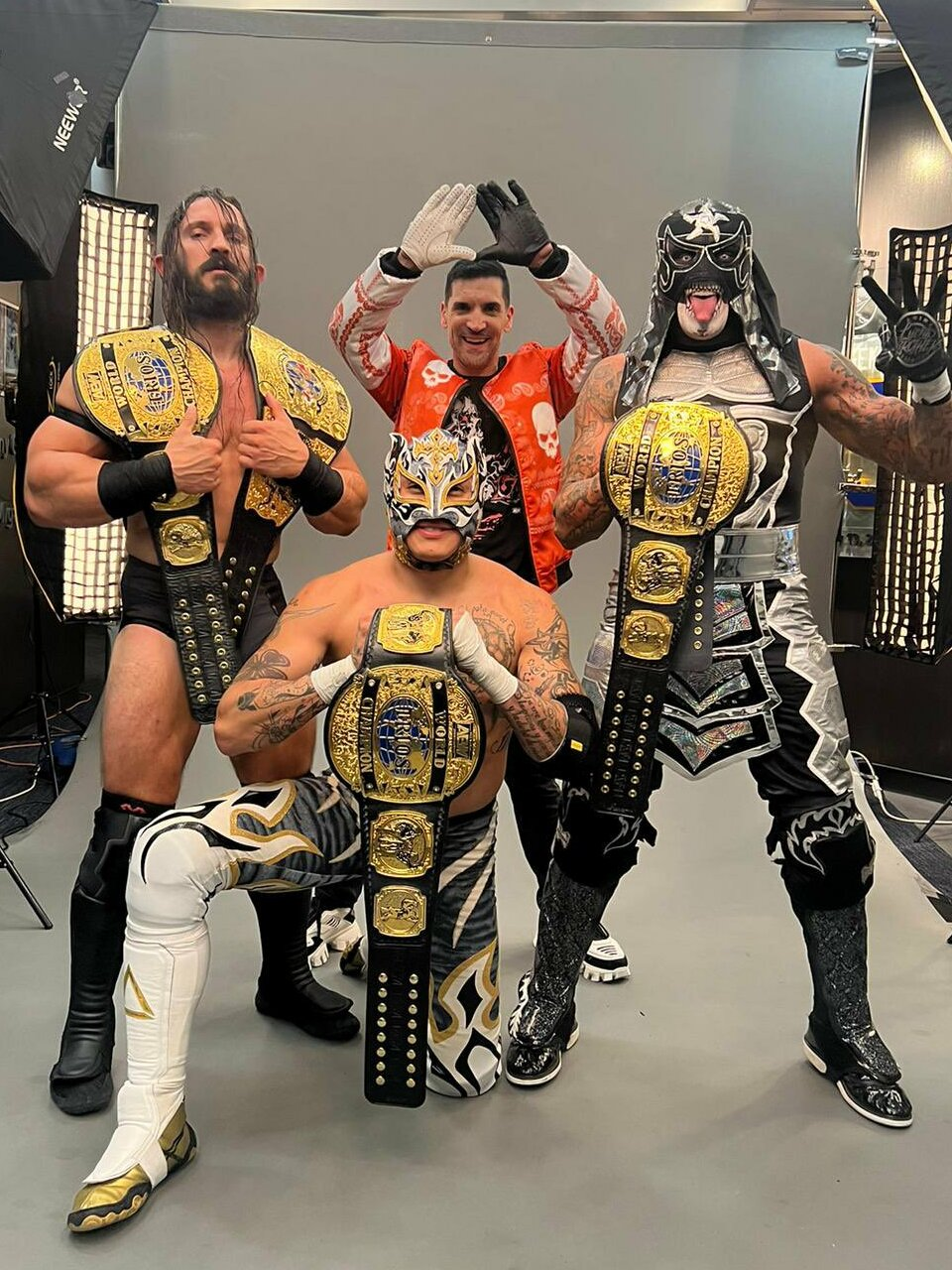
Death Triangle are former AEW World Trios Champions

- All Elite Wrestling
  - AEW All-Atlantic/International Championship (2 times) – Pac (1), Fénix (1)
  - AEW World Tag Team Championship (1 time) – Penta and Fénix
  - AEW World Trios Championship (1 time)
  - AEW All-Atlantic Championship Tournament (2022) – Pac
  - AEW World Tag Team Championship Eliminator Tournament (2021) – Penta and Fénix
  - Casino Tag Team Royale (2021) – Pac and Fénix
  - Dynamite Award (1 time)
    - Best Tag Team Brawl (2022) – Young Bucks vs Lucha Brothers, Steel Cage Match
- Pro Wrestling Illustrated
  - Ranked No. 4 of the top 50 Tag Teams in the PWI Tag Team 50 in 2022
- Ring of Honor
  - ROH World Tag Team Championship (1 time) – Penta and Fénix

Preceded by None (first)	Tag Team Casino Battle Royale winner 2021	Succeeded by Matt Jackson and Nick Jackson
