= Luchasaurus =

American professional wrestler

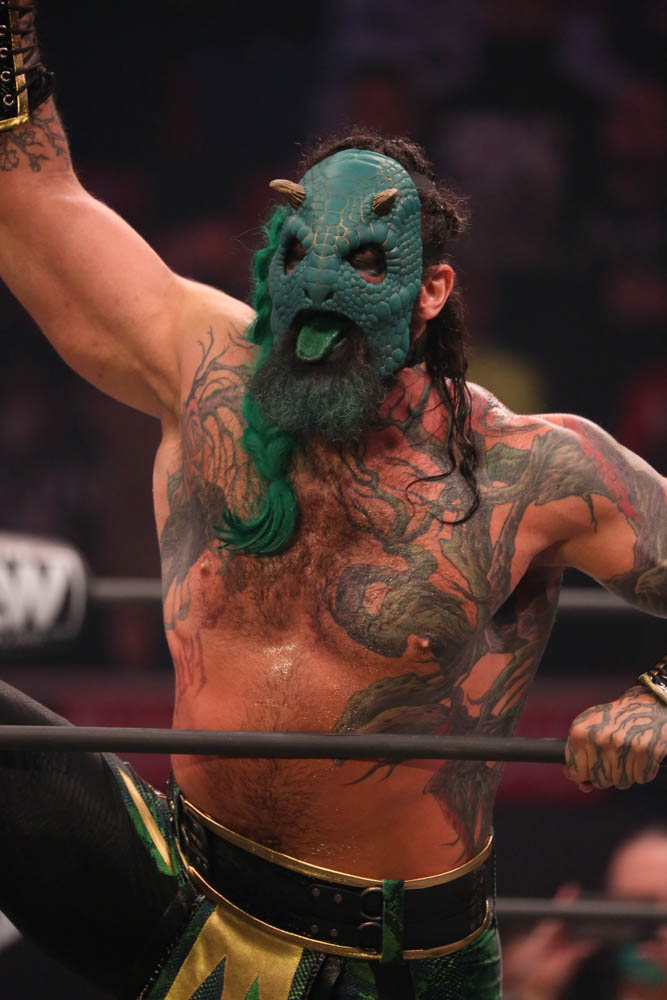
- Luchasaurus in 2022

Personal information
- Born: Austin Matelson; March 10, 1985 (age 41) Woodland Hills, California, U.S.
- Education: California State University, Northridge (BA, MA)

Professional wrestling career
- Ring name(s): Austin Draven; Austin Morrison; Judas Draven; Judas Devlin; Just Judas; Killswitch; Luchasaurus; Vibora
- Billed height: 6 ft 5 in (196 cm)
- Billed weight: 275 lb (125 kg)
- Billed from: "The Tar Pits"
- Trained by: Ballard Brothers; Bill DeMott; Billy Gunn; Ric Drasin; Ricky Steamboat; Terry Taylor
- Debut: 2009

Austin Matelson (born March 10, 1985), better known by his ring name Luchasaurus, is an American luchador enmascarado (or masked professional wrestler). He is signed to All Elite Wrestling (AEW), where he is one-half of Jurassic Express with Jack Perry.

Matelson began his professional wrestling career in 2009. He then signed a developmental contract with WWE in 2012 and was sent to train at the former Florida Championship Wrestling (FCW) under the ring name Judas Devlin; that same year, FCW was rebranded as NXT, where Matelson remained until his release in 2014. After a two-year hiatus, he signed with Lucha Underground as Vibora and worked there from 2016 to 2018. He also began working on the independent circuit in 2016 under the Luchasaurus gimmick until he signed with AEW in 2019. He continued his partnership with Jungle Boy as Jurassic Express, becoming a one-time AEW World Tag Team Champion. He later aligned with Christian Cage, which saw him win the AEW TNT Championship, and later took on the ring name Killswitch in September 2023 as a member of The Patriarchy

During his two-year wrestling hiatus from 2014 to 2016, Matelson appeared on Access Hollywood and was a house-guest on the reality competition, Big Brother 17, in which he placed 5th. He also appeared on The Price Is Right.

== Professional wrestling career ==
=== Early career (2009–2012) ===
Matleson started his wrestling career out in California working in various independent promotions.

=== WWE (2012–2014) ===
In 2012, Matelson signed a developmental contract with WWE and was sent for training at Florida Championship Wrestling (FCW) where he was given the ring name Judas Devlin. On August 1, 2012, he made his FCW debut teaming with Corey Graves defeating Briley Pierce and CJ Parker. In 2012, FCW was rebranded as NXT and Devlin transferred to the new development brand, performing mainly at house shows. Matelson was released in 2014 after a severe hip injury suffered in March 2013. He would be inactive from wrestling.

=== Independent circuit (2016–2019) ===
Matelson made his return to professional wrestling in 2016, having not competed since his release from WWE in 2014. On June 17, 2016, in a match for Millennium Pro Wrestling (MPW) under the ring name Austin Draven, he defeated Ryan J. Morales. On September 30, 2016, under the ring name Just Judas, he defeated Danny Divine to become MPW Heavyweight Champion.

On November 9, 2017, Matelson teamed with fellow Big Brother contestant Jessie Godderz under the team name "Team Big Brother", they defeated HATE (Peter Avalon and Ray Rosas) in a match for Bar Wrestling.

After Matelson became known for his work as the Vibora character in Lucha Underground, he started to use the character in the independent circuit. He changed the name to "Luchasaurus", after fans chanted that during his Lucha Underground debut. On November 17 and 18, Matelson wrestled for House of Hardcore under the new gimmick and ring name Luchasaurus, defeating Alex Reynolds on the first night and winning on the second night in a three-way by defeating Matt Riddle and Willie Mack.

=== Lucha Underground (2016–2018) ===
In May 2016, Matelson, under a mask and the ring name Vibora, made his Lucha Underground debut as a part of the Reptile Tribe stable. On May 7, 2016, Vibora along with Pindar and Drago won the Lucha Underground Trios Championship. On October 11, at Ultima Lucha Tres, Reptile Tribe lost the Lucha Underground Trios Championship against Dante Fox, Killshot and The Mack.

On the July 18, 2018 episode of Lucha Underground, Vibora defeated Johnny Mundo. On the August 1 episode of Lucha Underground, the character Vibora was "killed off" via decapitation by a sword-wielding Taya Valkyrie.

=== All Elite Wrestling (2019–present) ===
==== Jurassic Express (2019–2022) ====
On May 25, 2019, Matelson debuted for All Elite Wrestling (AEW) at Double or Nothing as a part of the pre-show Casino Battle Royale. He lasted until the final three, before being eliminated by Adam Page. Three days later, it was revealed that he had signed with the company full-time as Luchasaurus. He would then continue his tag team with Jungle Boy, as he managed him at Fyter Fest. At Fight for the Fallen, they were defeated in a Triple Threat tag team match involving The Dark Order (Evil Uno and Stu Grayson) and The Hybrid 2 (Angélico and Jack Evans). At All Out, Luchasaurus, alongside Jungle Boy and Marko Stunt, would debut as the stable Jurassic Express. Luchasaurus also sporadically competed as a singles competitor, most notably participating in the Casino Ladder match at Double or Nothing on May 23, 2020. On the August 12 episode of Dynamite, Jurassic Express unsuccessfully challenged Page and Kenny Omega for the AEW World Tag Team Championship. The following year, Christian Cage began mentoring Jungle Boy, which saw Cage become a prominent figure as an associate of the stable, and led to Stunt being eventually phased out.

On the August 18, 2021 episode of Dynamite, Jurassic Express received a title shot for the World Tag Team Championship against The Young Bucks (Matt Jackson and Nick Jackson), but failed to win. Following that, Jurassic Express participated in a tournament to determine the #1 contenders for the World Tag Team Championship. On the August 20 episode of Rampage, they defeated Private Party in the opening round. On the August 27 episode of Rampage, they lost to the Lucha Brothers (Penta El Zero Miedo and Rey Fénix) in the final. For three months, Jurassic Express feuded with various members of The Elite. On the September 1 episode of Dynamite, they partnered the Lucha Brothers in a loss to the Good Brothers (Doc Gallows and Karl Anderson) and the Young Bucks. On the September 24 episode of Rampage, Cage and Jurassic Express were defeated by the SuperKliq (Adam Cole and the Young Bucks), with Luchasaurus taking the pin. On the October 6 episode of Dynamite, Cage, Jurassic Express and Bryan Danielson were defeated by Cole, Omega and the Young Bucks. At Full Gear, Cage and Jurassic Express defeated the SuperKliq in a falls count anywhere match. On the November 19 episode of Rampage, Jurassic Express defeated Cole and Bobby Fish. On the January 5, 2022 episode of Dynamite, Jurassic Express defeated the Lucha Brothers to win their first World Tag Team Championship.

At the Revolution event on March 6, Jurassic Express successfully defended the championship against the Young Bucks and reDRagon (Bobby Fish and Kyle O'Reilly) in a three-way tag team match. At Double or Nothing on May 29, they retained the championship in a three-way tag match against Team Taz (Ricky Starks and Powerhouse Hobbs) and Swerve In Our Glory (Keith Lee and Swerve Strickland). After Jurassic Express lost the championship to the Young Bucks in a ladder match at Road Rager, Cage turned on Jungle Boy, with Luchasaurus also turning heel when he joined Cage. At the start of his alliance with Cage, Luchasaurus was presented as a "monster heel" and started squashing a number of opponents within minutes, all at Cage's direction. At week two of Fyter Fest, Luchasaurus turned on Christian Cage to realign with Jungle Boy. However, this was also a short-lived reunion, as at All Out, Luchasaurus cemented himself as a heel by attacking his tag partner once again and solidifying his alliance with Cage. As a result, Luchasaurus began feuding with Jungle Boy, who by this point was going by "Jungle Boy" Jack Perry, defeating him in a match on the October 12 episode of Dynamite. However, Luchasaurus lost to Perry in a steel cage match at Full Gear to end the rivalry.

==== The Patriarchy (2023–2024) ====
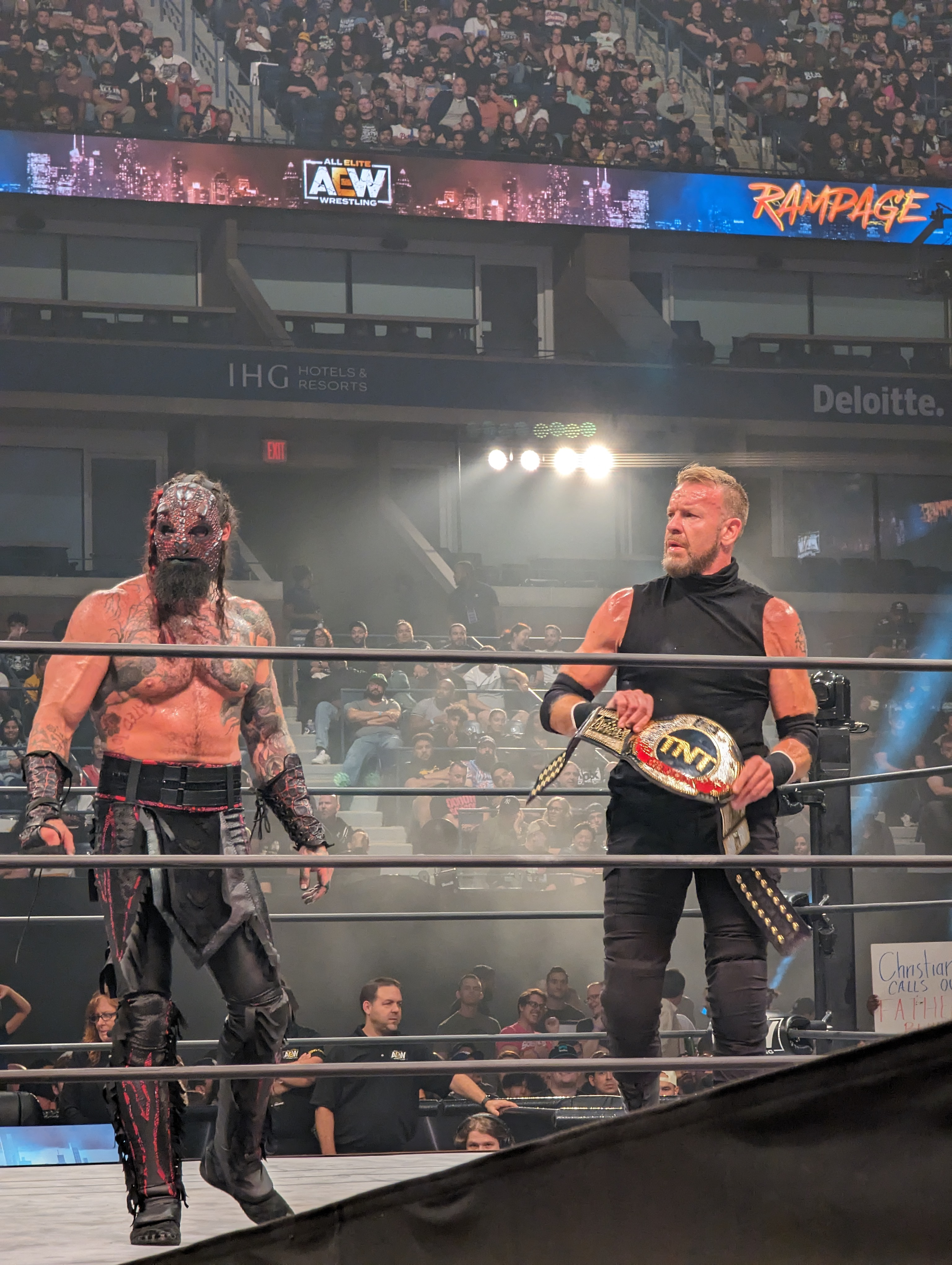
Killswitch and Cage in September 2023. Despite holding the AEW TNT Championship for three months, Killswitch was not presented as champion, with Cage, who later succeeded him, holding the belt instead.

On the June 17, 2023 premiere episode of AEW Collision, Luchasaurus defeated Wardlow to win the AEW TNT Championship. Luchasaurus held the title for three months, retaining against Shawn Spears at Battle of the Belts VII, Brock Anderson on the August 12 episode of Collision and Darby Allin at All Out. Luchasaurus would later lose the title to Cage in a three-way match that also involved Allin on the September 23 episode of Collision. At WrestleDream, Cage defeated Allin in a two out of three falls match to retain the championship. After the match, Cage, Luchasaurus, and Nick Wayne (who turned on Allin) assaulted Allin and Sting; they were interrupted by the debuting Adam Copeland, who ran out to confront Cage and save Allin. Cage's faction was later called The Patriarchy. At Full Gear, The Patriarchy lost to Copeland, Sting, and Allin in a six-man tag team match with Luchasaurus taking the pin. On the November 22 episode of Dynamite, Cage renamed Luchasaurus as Killswitch (named after Cage's finishing move) and dubbed Killswitch as his "finisher". At Worlds End, Killswitch won a 20-man battle royale for a future TNT Championship title match. Later that night, Cage lost the TNT Championship to Copeland in a no disqualification match. As Killswitch was about to sign off his title match contract on Copeland, Cage demanded Killswitch to hand over the contract and Killswitch relented. Cage then defeated Copeland to regain the TNT Championship. Cage eventually lost the TNT Championship to Copeland again in March 2024. On the July 21 episode of Collision, The Patriarchy defeated the Bang Bang Gang (Juice Robinson and The Gunns) for the vacant AEW World Trios Championship after interference from Mother Wayne. On August 25 at All In, The Patriarchy lost the AEW World Trios Championship in a four-way London ladder match to Pac and Blackpool Combat Club (Claudio Castagnoli and Wheeler Yuta), ending their reign at 37 days. Later in the event, Killswitch and Cage entered the Casino Gauntlet Match, where Killswitch assisted Cage to win the match.

On September 30, 2024, it was reported that Matelson was hospitalized due to double pneumonia after his fiancé found him collapsed at home. He was rushed to the hospital where his blood oxygen level was found to be below 80% and was days away from permanent lung damage. Matelson was told his recovery period could take up to a month, sidelining him indefinitely. During his time away, The Patriarchy was disbanded when Nick turned on Cage after the pair failed to win the AEW World Tag Team Championship from The Hurt Syndicate (Bobby Lashley and Shelton Benjamin) at All In: Texas on July 12, 2025.

==== Jurassic Express reunion (2025) ====
On the August 20, 2025 episode of Dynamite, Killswitch returned and was revealed as the replacement partner for Kip Sabian against Adam Copeland and Christian Cage at Forbidden Door, filling in for the injured Nick Wayne. On August 24 at Forbidden Door, Killswitch and Sabian were defeated by Copeland and Cage. On September 17 at September to Remember, Killswitch teased a face turn after walking out on Sabian during their match against JetSpeed (Kevin Knight and "Speedball" Mike Bailey). On September 20 at All Out, Killswitch cemented his face turn after saving Jack Perry from The Young Bucks, reuniting Jurassic Express and reverting back to his Luchasaurus name. On October 18 at WrestleDream, Jurassic Express defeated The Young Bucks. At Full Gear on November 22, Jurassic Express teamed with Kenny Omega, losing to the Young Bucks and Josh Alexander; post-match, Alexander and the Don Callis Family (Rocky Romero, Mark Davis, El Clon and Hechicero) attacked Omega and Jurassic Express until the Young Bucks returned to aid them. After fending off the Don Callis Family, Jurassic Express and The Young Bucks shook hands, signaling the end of their feud. On December 31 at Dynamite: New Year's Smash, Luchasaurus was attacked by The Demand (Ricochet, Bishop Kaun, and Toa Liona). This was done to write him off television as he had suffered a legitimate shoulder injury.

== Other media ==
In the summer of 2015, Matelson appeared as a contestant in the 17th season of Big Brother. He was evicted during the twelfth week and placed fifth. He returned during the 19th season for the "BB Comics" competition with other former contestants, including Dan Gheesling and fellow wrestler Jessie Godderz.

=== Filmography ===
Television
Year	Title	Role	Notes
2015	Access Hollywood	Himself	
2015	Big Brother 17	Himself	
2016	The Price Is Right	Himself	
2017	Big Brother 19	Himself	

== Personal life ==
Before beginning studies at California State University, Northridge, Matelson had been entirely homeschooled. He earned two history degrees at CSUN — a B.A. in 2008 and a M.A. in 2010, with his master's concentration and thesis in medieval literature.

While in the Big Brother house, Matelson began a relationship with Liz Nolan. The two continued to date for five months before breaking up in February 2016.

=== Bill DeMott scandal ===
In late February and March 2015, several former NXT trainees previously working within the WWE developmental system alleged misconduct by head trainer Bill DeMott, with Matelson and Brandon Traven publicizing complaints which they claimed they had submitted to WWE management about DeMott back in March 2013, when they were still employed with WWE. Meanwhile, other ex-trainees like Briley Pierce and Derrick Bateman also made allegations in 2015, while previous allegations made in 2013 by Chad Baxter and Chase Donovan were also noted. They accused DeMott of making trainees perform dangerous drills, physically assaulting and bullying trainees, using homophobic and racial slurs amongst other derogatory terms, and condoning sexual harassment. WWE released statements regarding some of the claims that came to light in 2013 and 2015, saying that investigations were done and no wrongdoing was found. On March 6, 2015, DeMott denied the allegations, but resigned from WWE "to avoid any embarrassment or damage" to the company.

== Championships and accomplishments ==
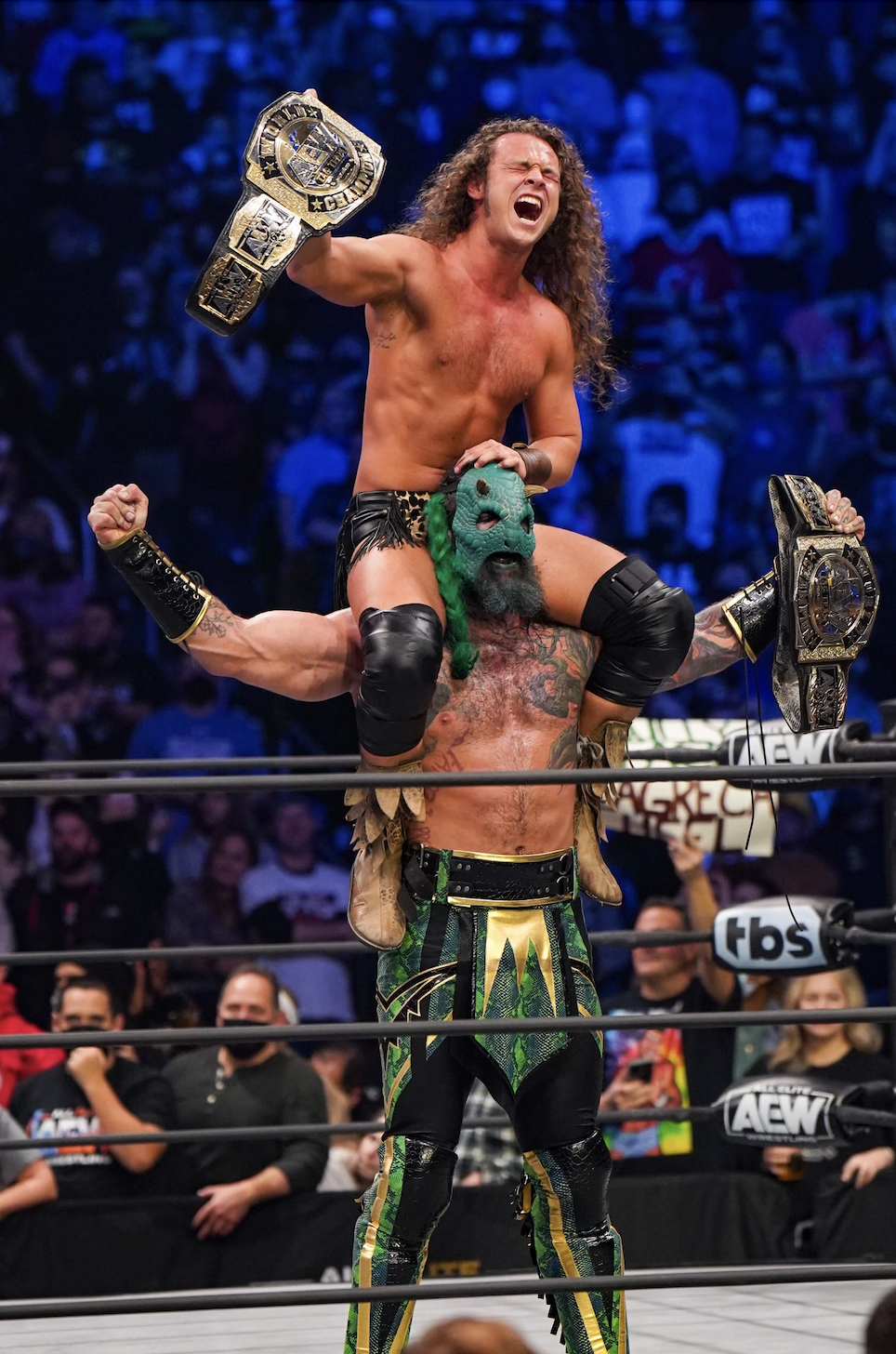
Jurassic Express as AEW World Tag Team Champions

- All Elite Wrestling
  - AEW TNT Championship (1 time)
  - AEW World Tag Team Championship (1 time) – with Jungle Boy
  - AEW World Trios Championship (1 time) – with Christian Cage and Nick Wayne
- All-Star Wrestling
  - ASW Tag Team Championship (1 time) – with The Thunder From Jalandhar
- DDT Pro-Wrestling
  - Ironman Heavymetalweight Championship (1 time)
- Lucha Underground
  - Lucha Underground Trios Championship (1 time) – with Drago and Pindar
- Pro Wrestling Illustrated
  - Ranked No. 105 of the top 500 singles wrestlers in the PWI 500 in 2020
- Millennium Pro Wrestling
  - MPW Heavyweight Championship (1 time)
