= Nick Wayne =

American professional wrestler (born 2005)

- Wayne at Death Before Dishonor 2026

Personal information
- Born: Nicholas Wayne Finley; July 10, 2005 (age 21) Seattle, Washington, U.S.
- Parent(s): Buddy Wayne (father); Shayna Wayne (mother)
- Relative: Moondog Ed Moretti (grandfather)

Professional wrestling career
- Ring name: Nick Wayne
- Billed height: 6 ft 1 in (185 cm)
- Billed weight: 175 lb (79 kg)
- Billed from: Seattle, Washington
- Trained by: Buddy Wayne
- Debut: April 27, 2018

Nicholas Wayne Finley (born July 10, 2005) is an American professional wrestler. He is signed to All Elite Wrestling (AEW), where he performs under his real name (stylized as Nick Wayne). He also makes appearances in AEW's sister promotion Ring of Honor (ROH) and in partner promotion New Japan Pro-Wrestling (NJPW).

Prior to joining AEW, Nick wrestled on the independent circuit – notably for DEFY Wrestling and Game Changer Wrestling (GCW). After joining AEW in 2023, he turned heel on his longtime friend Darby Allin and joined The Patriarchy alongside Mother Wayne, Nick's real-life mother, Christian Cage, and Killswitch. He would later win the AEW World Trios Championship as part of the stable, becoming the youngest champion in AEW history at 19 years old. He would later win the ROH World Television Championship, becoming the youngest champion in the title's history and also the fourth-longest reigning champion at 387 days. In 2025, Nick would rebrand The Patriarchy as The Matriarchy and become the leader of the stable alongside Mother Wayne and Kip Sabian; he would continue to lead the stable until its quiet dissolution in early 2026.

== Professional wrestling career ==
=== Early career (2018–2023) ===
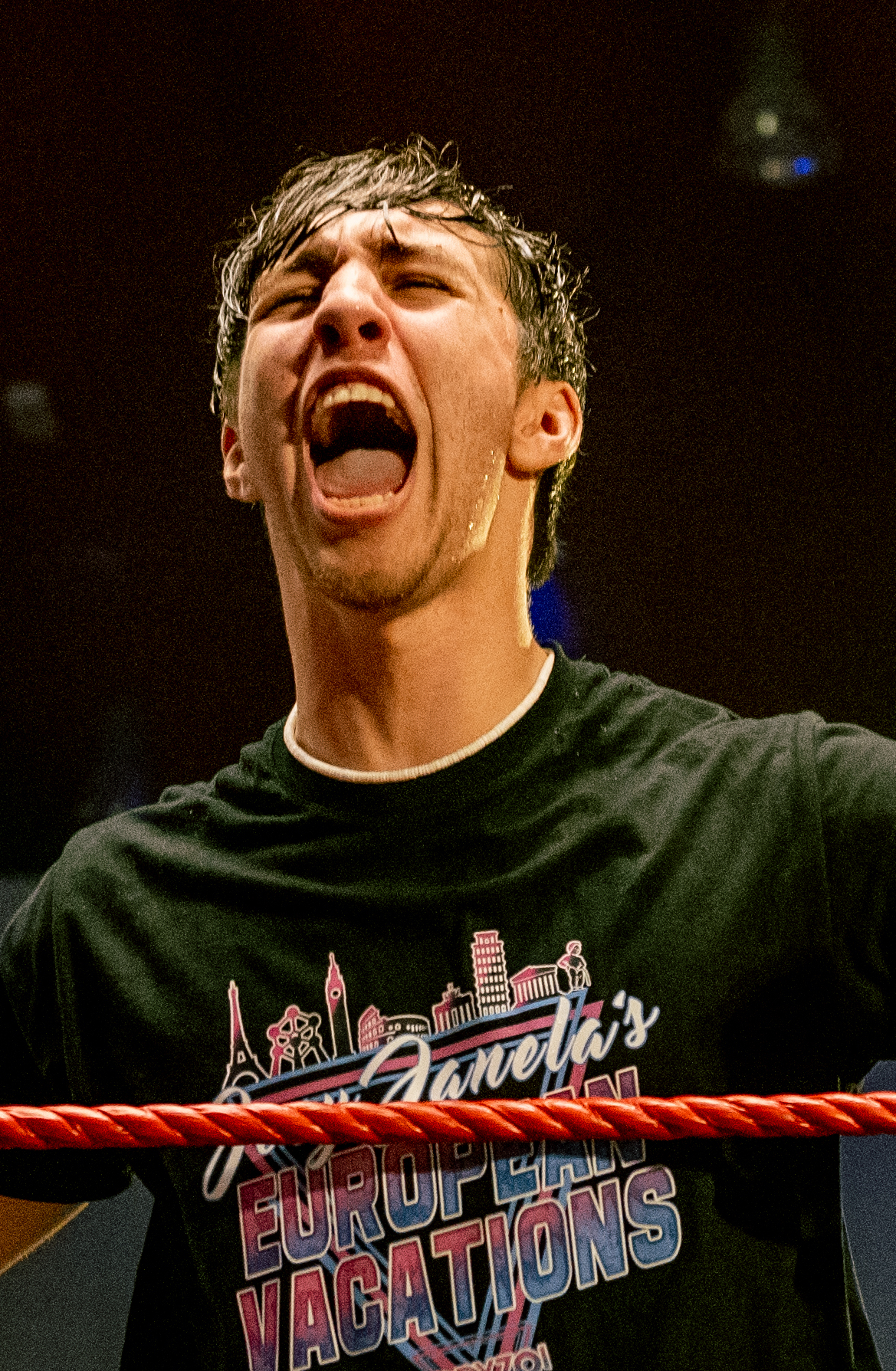
Wayne during a match in 2023

Wayne began wrestling during childhood, being trained by his father Buddy Wayne. He debuted at an Invasion Championship Wrestling show on April 27, 2018, at the age of 12.

On July 31, 2022 at Ric Flair's Last Match, Wayne faced Jonathan Gresham, Alan Angels and Konosuke Takeshita in a Four Corners match to determine the #1 contender to the Progress World Championship, where Gresham won the match.

On April 8, 2023, Wayne won the DEFY World Championship after defeating Swerve Strickland. He successfully defended the championship on two occasions before being defeated by Kenta on June 4, ending his reign at 56 days.

=== All Elite Wrestling / Ring of Honor (2023–present) ===
==== The Patriarchy / The Matriarchy (2023–2026) ====
On February 12, 2022, Wayne was offered an All Elite Wrestling (AEW) contract by longtime friend Darby Allin during DEFY Wrestling's 5th Anniversary event.

After turning 18 years old, Wayne made his debut for the promotion on the July 12, 2023 episode of Dynamite, in Saskatoon, Saskatchewan, Canada, losing to Swerve Strickland. On September 21, Wayne made his debut for AEW's sister promotion Ring of Honor (ROH) on that day's episode of Ring of Honor Wrestling, unsuccessfully challenging Katsuyori Shibata for the ROH Pure Championship.

At WrestleDream on October 1, Wayne turned on Allin to side with Christian Cage during Cage's and Allin's match for the AEW TNT Championship, turning heel in the process. Wayne joined Cage's stable The Patriarchy with Luchasaurus (later renamed to Killswitch) and was dubbed "The Prodigy" by Cage. At Full Gear, The Patriarchy lost to Adam Copeland, Sting and Allin in a six-man tag team match. On the December 23 episode of Collision, Cage announced that Wayne's mother, Shayna, has joined The Patriarchy as "The Matriarch" Mother Wayne.

On the July 21, 2024 episode of Collision, The Patriarchy defeated the Bang Bang Gang (Juice Robinson and The Gunns) for the vacant AEW World Trios Championship after interference from Mother Wayne. This is Wayne's first world championship title win and also made Wayne, at 19 years old, the youngest champion in AEW's history. On August 25 at All In, The Patriarchy lost the AEW World Trios Championship in a four-way London ladder match to Pac and Blackpool Combat Club (Claudio Castagnoli and Wheeler Yuta), ending their reign at 37 days.

On April 17 at the Spring BreakThru episode of Collision, Wayne defeated Komander to win the ROH World Television Championship for the first time and also makes Wayne, at 19 years old, the youngest title holder. This marked Wayne's first ever singles championship in a major promotion. On July 11 at Supercard of Honor, Wayne successfully defended his title against Titán. After Christian and Wayne failed to win the AEW World Tag Team Championship from The Hurt Syndicate (Bobby Lashley and Shelton Benjamin) at All In: Texas on July 12,, Wayne (along with Kip Sabian) turned on Christian and attacked him, thus kicking him out The Patriarchy. On the July 16 episode of Dynamite, The Patriachy was renamed to "The Matriachy". In August 2025, it was reported that Wayne had suffered a broken foot and would be out of action. Wayne returned from injury on the February 26, 2026 episode of Ring of Honor Wrestling, defeating Lucas Riley. On May 9 (aired May 14) at ROH Supercard Showdown, Wayne lost his title to AR Fox.

==== Singles competition (2026–present) ====
Wayne in 2026

After returning from competing in New Japan Pro-Wrestling's Best of the Super Juniors tournament in July 2026, Wayne began appearing as a singles wrestler without his mother and Kip Sabian, quietly disbanding the Matriarchy. On August 21 at Death Before Dishonor, Wayne unsuccessfully challenged Bandido for the ROH World Championship. On August 30 at All In, Wayne competed in the Casino Gauntlet match for an AEW World Championship opportunity which was won by Andrade El Idolo. Following All In, Wayne entered a feud with Jericho, trading victories against each other over the following weeks. On October 17 at WrestleDream, Wayne defeated Jericho in their third match to end their feud. On November 16 during a Selection Special uploaded to AEW's YouTube Channel Wayne was announced as a participant in the 2026 Continental Classic competing in the Gold League.

=== New Japan Pro-Wrestling (2025–present) ===
In 2025 and 2026, Wayne participated in New Japan Pro-Wrestling (NJPW)'s Best of the Super Juniors tournament. During the 2025 tournament, Wayne notably scored a win over the reigning IWGP Junior Heavyweight Champion El Desperado. Also in 2026, Wayne teamed with Kushida to form "Time Splliters V2" (also shortened to "TV2") in the 2026 Super Junior Tag League as part of Block A. The duo finished the tournament with finished with 4 points (2–3) and failed to qualify for the finals.

== Personal life ==
Wayne is a third generation wrestler, being the son of Buddy and Shayna Wayne, and the grandson of Moondog Ed Moretti. Buddy Wayne died at the age of 50 on June 17, 2017 from a heart attack.

== Championships and accomplishments ==
- 5CC Wrestling
  - 5CC Championship (1 time)
- All Elite Wrestling
  - AEW World Trios Championship (1 time) – with Christian Cage and Killswitch
- DEFY Wrestling
  - DEFY World Championship (1 time)
- Game Changer Wrestling
  - GCW Tag Team Championship (1 time) – with Jordan Oliver
- Pro Wrestling Illustrated
  - Ranked No. 78 of the top 500 singles wrestlers in the PWI 500 in 2025
- Ring of Honor
  - ROH World Television Championship (1 time)
