= The Patriarchy (professional wrestling) =

Professional wrestling stable

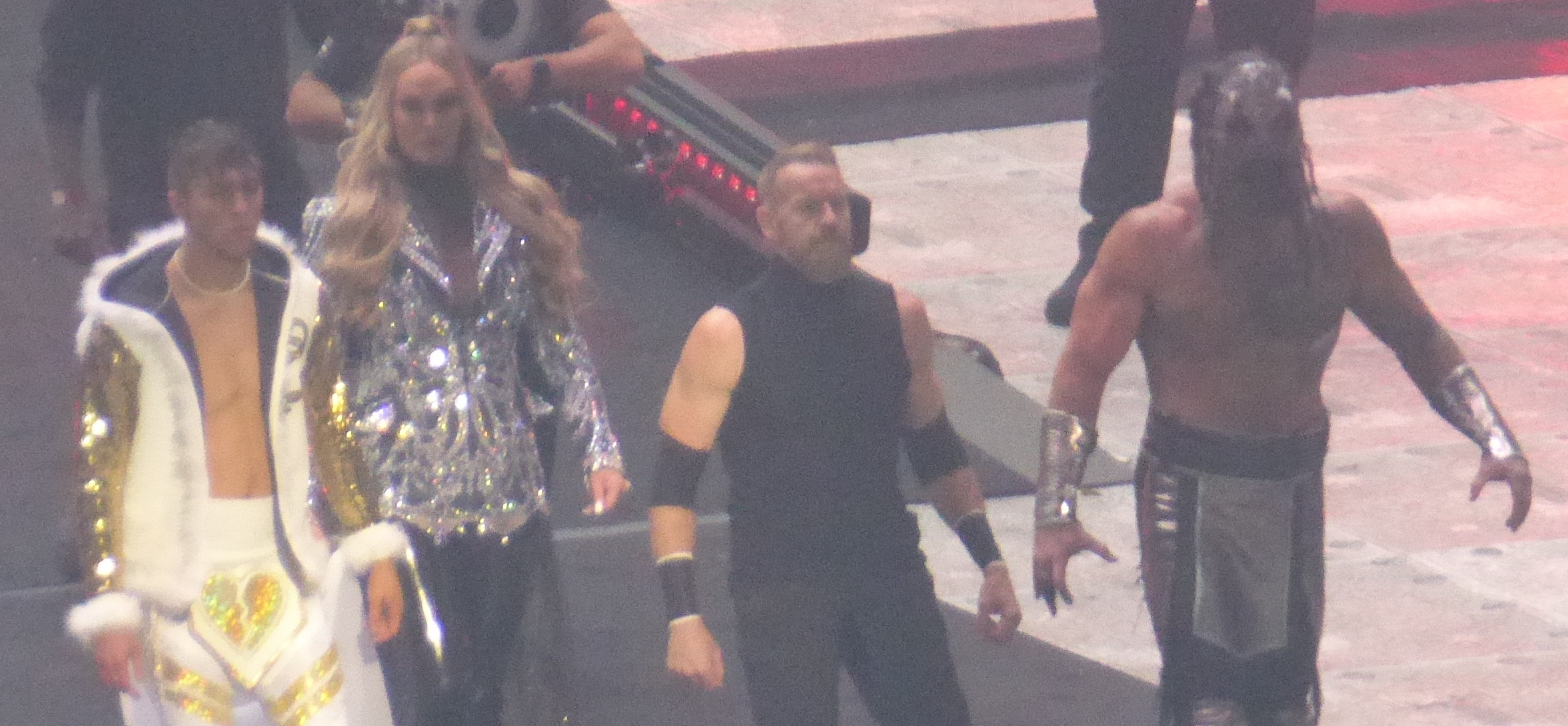
- The Patriarchy (Nick Wayne, Mother Wayne, Christian Cage, and Killswitch) (left to right) in August 2024

Stable
- Name(s): The Matriarchy; The Patriarchy
- Former members: Christian Cage (first leader); Luchasaurus/Killswitch; Nick Wayne (second leader); Kip Sabian; Mother Wayne (valet)
- Debut: October 1, 2023
- Disbanded: May 9, 2026
- Years active: 2023–2026

The Patriarchy, also known as The Matriachy, was a villainous professional wrestling stable in All Elite Wrestling (AEW) and Ring of Honor (ROH), consisting of Christian Cage, Nick Wayne, Killswitch, and Kip Sabian with Mother Wayne as their valet. Nick is a former ROH World Television Champion and is the youngest wrestler to hold the title.The stable's original name was derived from Cage's on-screen character of being a "father figure" to his stablemates. Cage, Killswitch and Nick are former one-time AEW World Trios Champions, and Cage was a one-time AEW TNT Champion.

== Background ==
Shortly after Christian Cage's All Elite Wrestling's (AEW) debut in 2021, he would begin a partnership with Jungle Boy and became his mentor. At Full Gear on November 13, Cage teamed with Jurassic Express (Jungle Boy and Luchasaurus) to defeat The Young Bucks (Matt and Nick Jackson) and Adam Cole in a six-man tag falls count anywhere match. On the June 15, 2022 special episode of Dynamite: Road Rager, Cage attacked Jungle Boy after Jungle Boy and Luchasaurus lost the AEW World Tag Team Championship to The Young Bucks in a ladder match. Two weeks later at Blood and Guts on June 29, Luchasaurus aligned himself with Cage, turning heel and seemingly ending Jurassic Express. However, at Fyter Fest on July 20, Luchasaurus stepped out of the way and allowed the returning Jungle Boy to chase Cage with a steel chair, apparently reuniting Jurassic Express. However, the reunion was short-lived as Luchasaurus attacked Jungle Boy during his entrance for his match against Cage at All Out on September 4, cementing his heel turn and alliance with Cage. Following this, it was revealed that Cage had suffered a triceps injury, which would render him unable to compete for the next six to nine months. Cage returned from his injury on the February 15, 2023 episode of Dynamite, attacking Jungle Boy. At Revolution, he was defeated by Jungle Boy in a Final Burial match to end their feud.

At Double or Nothing on May 28, Cage lost to Wardlow in a ladder match for the AEW TNT Championship. Wardlow then lost the title to Luchasaurus, with Cage's help, on the premiere episode of Collision on June 17. Cage then started a new storyline where he claimed to be the TNT Champion and would carry the championship around with him, despite the actual champion being Luchasaurus. At All Out on September 3, Cage helped Luchasaurus defeat Allin to retain the AEW TNT Championship. On the September 23 episode of Collision, Cage pinned Luchasaurus in a three-way match (also involving Allin) to become the new AEW TNT Champion.

== History ==
=== The Patriachy (2023–2025) ===
==== Formation and feud with Adam Copeland (2023–2024) ====
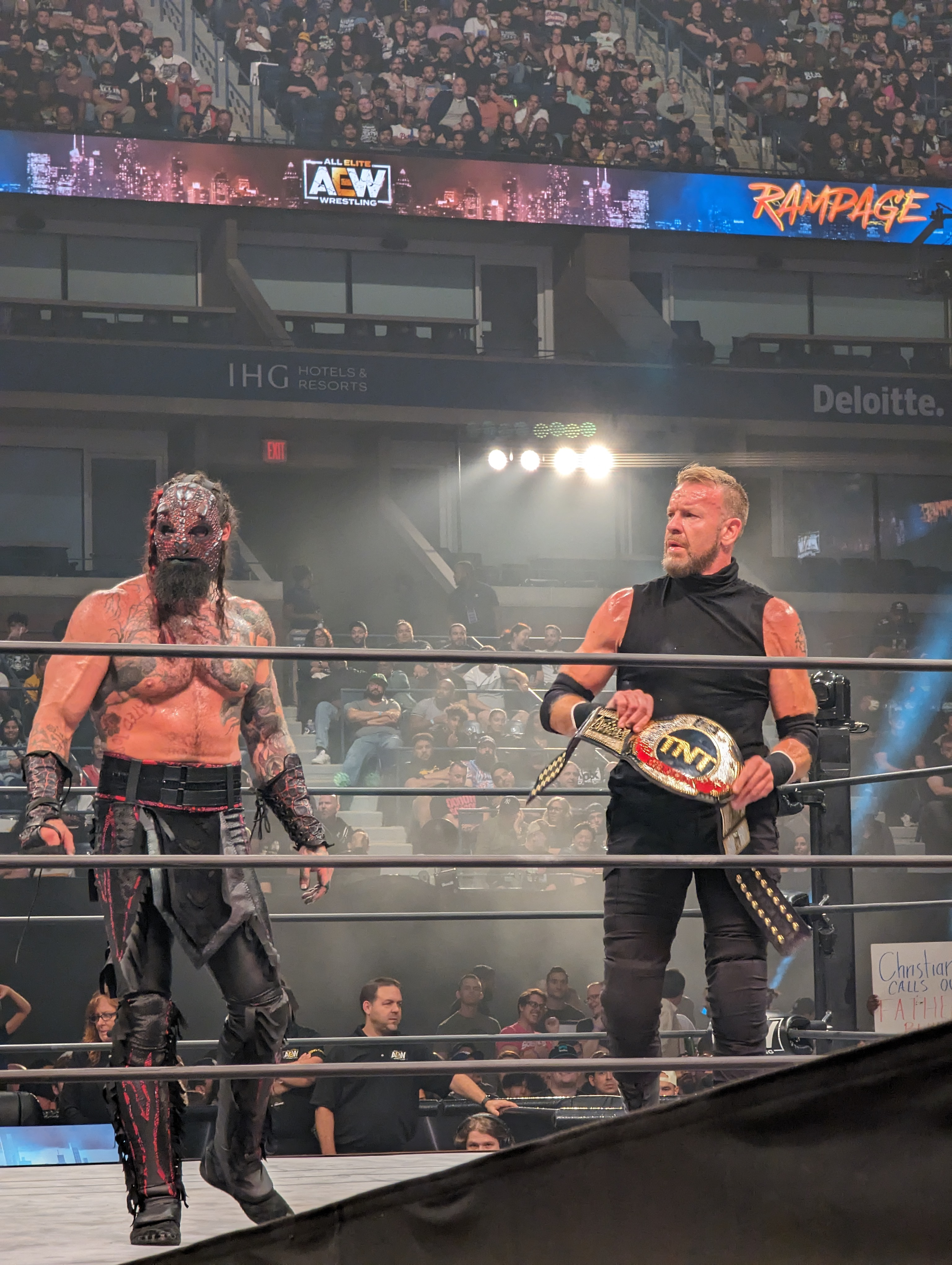
Killswitch (left) and Christian Cage (right) as AEW TNT Champion in 2023.

At WrestleDream on October 1, 2023, Christian Cage defeated Darby Allin in a two out of three falls match to retain the AEW TNT Championship. After the match, Cage, Luchasaurus, and Nick Wayne (who turned against Allin) assaulted Allin and Sting. They were interrupted by the debuting Adam Copeland who ran out to confront Cage. Cage's faction was later called The Patriarchy, with Cage being recognized as "The Patriarch" of the faction. At Full Gear, The Patriarchy lost to Copeland, Sting and Allin in a six-man tag team match. On the following episode of Dynamite, Cage renamed Luchasaurus as Killswitch and Wayne as "The Prodigy" Nick Wayne. On the December 6 episode of Dynamite, Cage successfully defended the AEW TNT Championship against Copeland after Shayna Wayne (Nick Wayne's mother) hit Copeland with the title belt in retaliation for taking out Nick. On the December 23 episode of Collision, Cage accepted Copeland's challenge to a no disqualification match for the AEW TNT Championship at Worlds End while announcing that Shayna Wayne had joined The Patriarchy as "The Matriarch" Mother Wayne. At Worlds End, Cage lost the title to Copeland, ending his reign at 98 days. Immediately after the match, Cage demanded and invoked Killswitch's AEW TNT Championship title shot (which Killswitch had won earlier that night) and defeated Copeland to win the AEW TNT Championship for the second time (his first after the creation of the stable). On the March 20, 2024 episode of Dynamite, Cage lost the AEW TNT Championship to Copeland in an I Quit match, ending his second reign at 81 days and ending their six month feud.

==== Cage's AEW World Championship pursuit and expulsion (2024–2025) ====
On the May 1, 2024 episode of Dynamite, Cage returned from an almost two-month hiatus as the challenger for Swerve Strickland's AEW World Championship at Double or Nothing on May 26 but he failed to win the title from Strickland. On the June 15 episode of Collision, Cage declared that he will challenge for the AEW World Championship again but will first challenge for the AEW World Trios Championship with Killswitch and Nick Wayne. On the July 21 episode of Collision, The Patriarchy defeated Bang Bang Gang (Juice Robinson, Colten and Austin Gunn) for the vacant AEW World Trios Championship. On August 25 at All In, The Patriarchy lost the AEW World Trios Championship in a four-way London ladder match to Pac and Blackpool Combat Club (Claudio Castagnoli and Wheeler Yuta), ending their reign at 37 days. Later in the event, Cage won a Casino Gauntlet Match to earn the right to challenge for the AEW World Championship whenever he wants. Two weeks later at All Out, Cage attempted to cash-in his AEW World Championship match contract on Bryan Danielson after Danielson successfully defended his title against Jack Perry (formerly Jungle Boy) but was blocked by the Blackpool Combat Club. On September 30, it was reported that Killswitch was hospitalized due to double pneumonia. On the October 23 episode of Dynamite, Kip Sabian saved Cage from an attack from Hook and was accepted as a member of The Patriarchy by Cage two weeks later. On November 23 at Full Gear, Cage attempted to cash-in on new AEW World Champion Jon Moxley but was blocked again, this time by Jay White. At Revolution on March 9, 2025, Cage cashed in his contract during the AEW World Championship match between Moxley and Adam Copeland (now renamed as Cope) to make it a three-way match but failed to win the title when he was choked out by Moxley.

Immediately after, cracks began to show within The Patriarchy when Nick stood up to Cage for losing the AEW World Championship match. On the April 17 episode of Collision: Spring BreakThru, Wayne defeated Komander to win the ROH World Television Championship for the first time and also makes Wayne, at 19 years old, the youngest title holder. This marked Wayne's first ever singles championship in a major promotion. After Cage and Nick failed to win the AEW World Tag Team Championship from The Hurt Syndicate (Bobby Lashley and Shelton Benjamin) at All In: Texas on July 12, Nick turned on Cage and attacked him, thus signaling his banishment from The Patriarchy. Cage was saved by Cope, where the latter told the former to "go find himself," hinting at a face turn for Cage.

=== The Matriachy (2025–2026) ===
On the July 16 episode of Dynamite, Nick, Mother Wayne, and Sabian rebranded The Patriarchy as The Matriachy. On the August 20 episode of Dynamite, Killswitch returned and was revealed as the replacement partner for Kip Sabian against Adam Copeland and Christian Cage at Forbidden Door, filling in for the injured Nick Wayne. On August 24 at Forbidden Door, Killswitch and Sabian were defeated by Copeland and Cage. On September 17 at September to Remember, Killswitch left The Matriachy after walking out on Sabian during their match against JetSpeed.

Wayne returned from injury on the February 26, 2026 episode of Ring of Honor Wrestling, defeating Lucas Riley. On May 9 (airing May 14) at ROH Supercard Showdown, Wayne lost his title to AR Fox. After returning from competing in New Japan Pro-Wrestling's Best of the Super Juniors tournament in July 2026, Wayne began appearing as a singles wrestler without his mother and Kip Sabian, quietly disbanding the Matriachy.

== Members ==
*	Founding member
I-II	Leader(s)
V	Valet

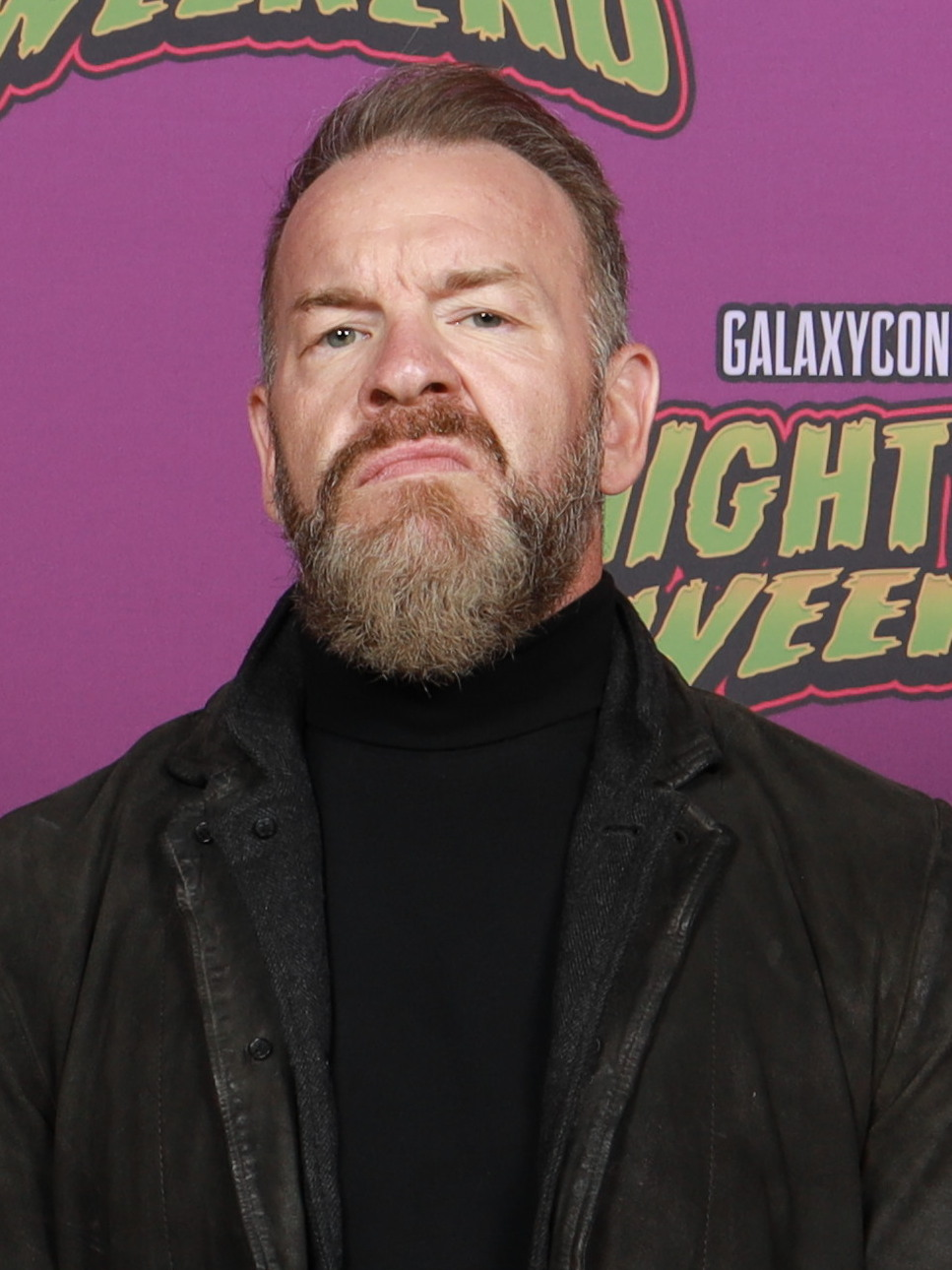
Christian Cage (*/I)

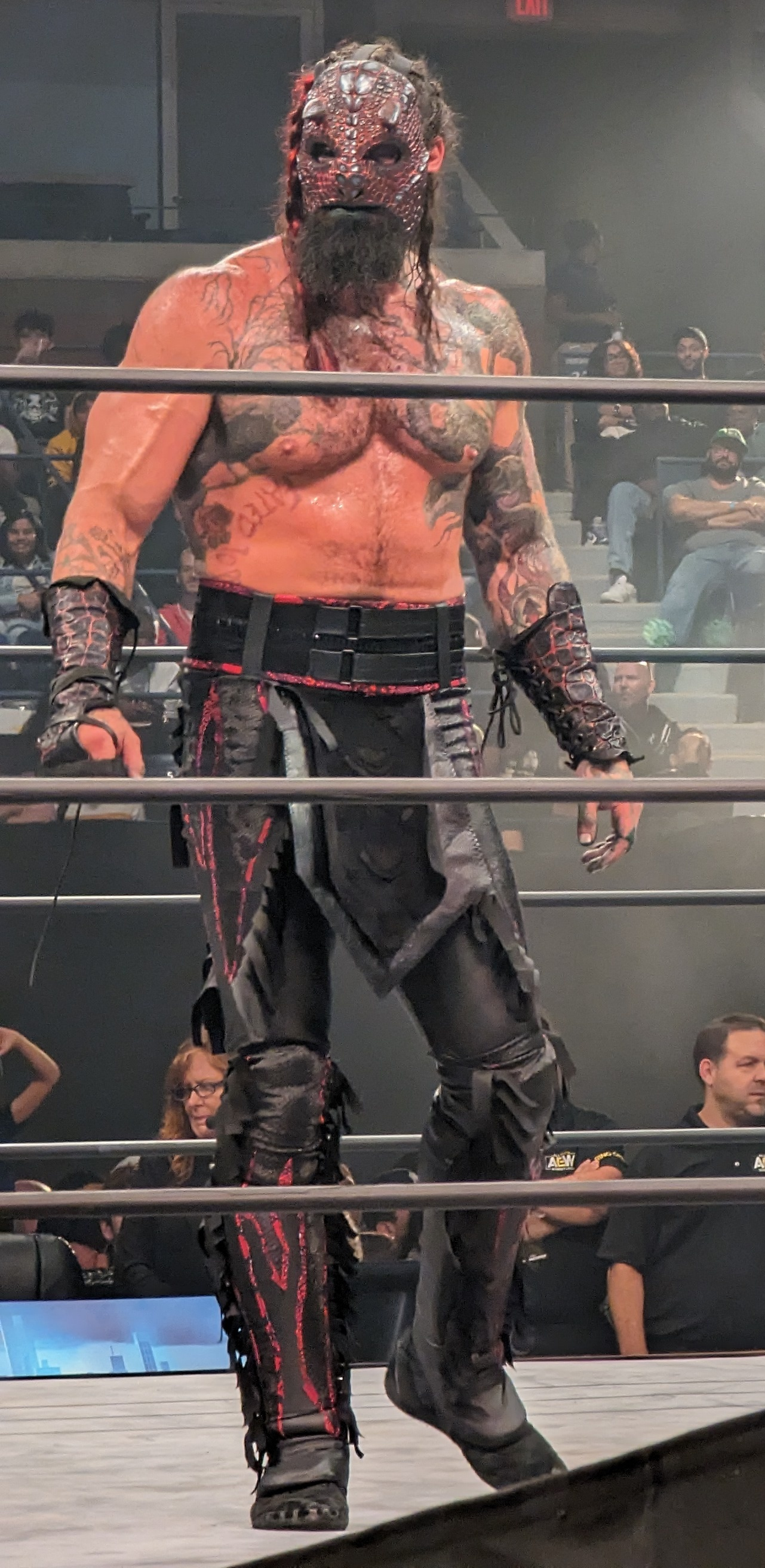
Luchasaurus/Killswitch (*)

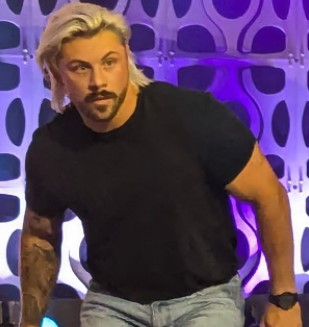
Kip Sabian

=== Former ===
Member		Joined	Left
Christian Cage	*I	October 1, 2023	July 12, 2025
Luchasaurus/Killswitch	*	October 1, 2023	September 17, 2025
Nick Wayne	*II	October 1, 2023	May 9, 2026
Mother Wayne	V	December 23, 2023	May 9, 2026
Kip Sabian		November 6, 2024	May 9, 2026

== Championships and accomplishments ==
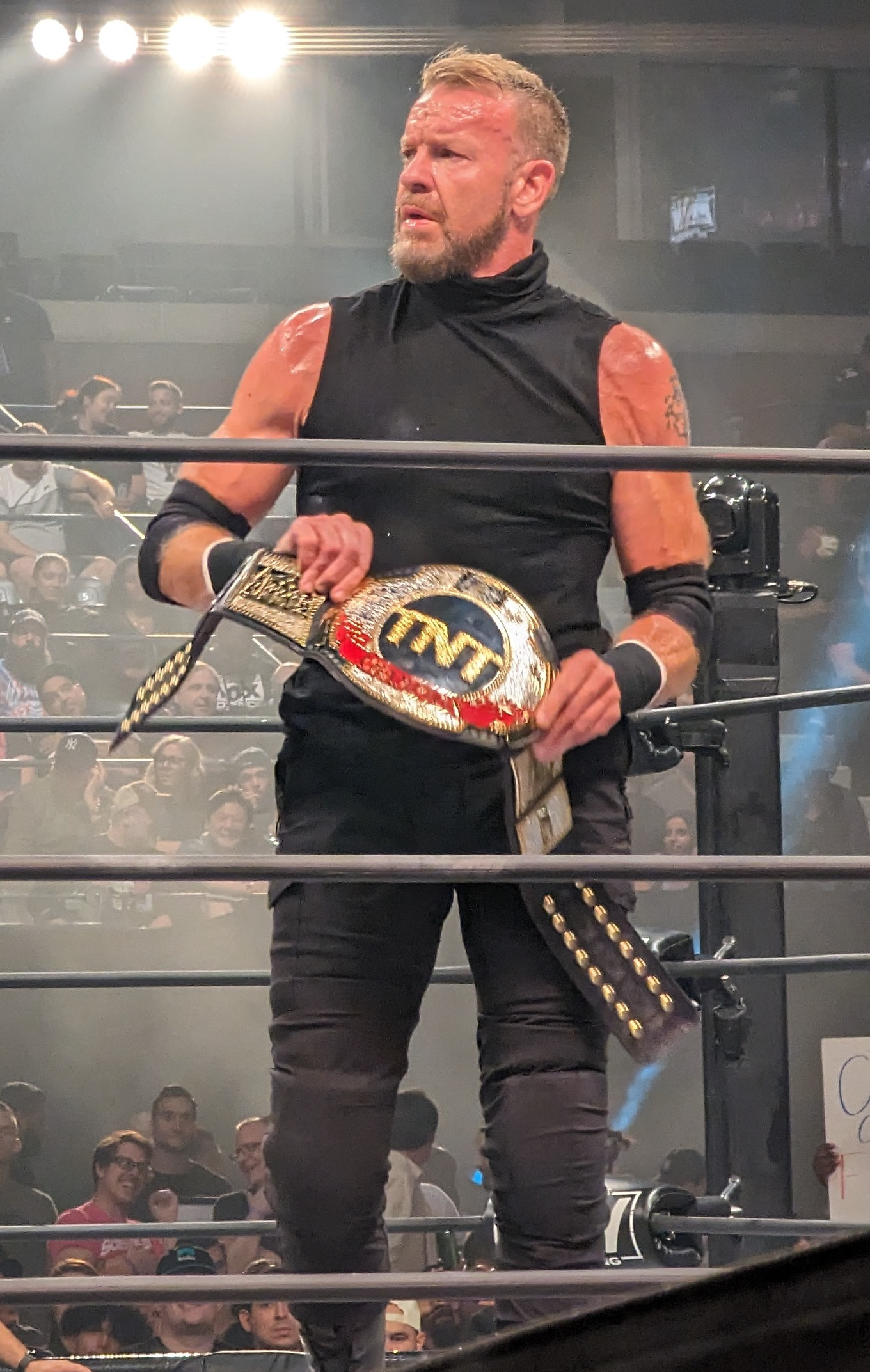
Cage as AEW TNT Champion.

- All Elite Wrestling
  - AEW TNT Championship (1 time) – Cage
  - AEW World Trios Championship (1 time) – Cage, Nick Wayne, and Killswitch
  - Casino Gauntlet (2024) – Cage
- Pro Wrestling Illustrated
  - Singles wrestlers
    - Ranked Wayne No. 147 of the top 500 singles wrestlers in the PWI 500 in 2023
- Ring of Honor
  - ROH World Television Championship (1 time) – Nick Wayne
