= All In (2025) =

All Elite Wrestling pay-per-view event

All In: Texas
- Promotional poster featuring Jon Moxley, Kenny Omega, "Hangman" Adam Page, "Timeless" Toni Storm, Kazuchika Okada, and Mercedes Moné
- Promotion: All Elite Wrestling
- Date: July 12, 2025
- City: Arlington, Texas
- Venue: Globe Life Field
- Attendance: 21,973 (Note: Turnstile attendance, which reflects the amount of tickets used for admission, was recorded at 21,973 by the Office of the Texas Governor. Tickets distributed, which reflects complimentary and sold tickets, was estimated at 27,245.)
- Buy rate: 182,500

Pay-per-view chronology
← Previous; Double or Nothing	Next → Forbidden Door

All In chronology
← Previous; 2024	Next → 2026

The 2025 All In, also promoted as All In: Texas, was a professional wrestling pay-per-view (PPV) event produced by All Elite Wrestling (AEW). It was AEW's third annual All In, and the fourth overall. The event took place on July 12, 2025, at Globe Life Field in Arlington, Texas. It marked AEW's first PPV in the U.S. state of Texas, its first at a Major League Baseball stadium, and the first All In to be livestreamed on Amazon Prime Video. The event was also the first professional wrestling event held at Globe Life Field. Additionally, All In was AEW's first afternoon PPV, with a special start time of 2:00 p.m. Central Time (3:00 p.m. Eastern Time), preceded by the Zero Hour pre-show at 12:00 p.m. CT (1:00 p.m. ET).

Twelve matches were contested at the event, including three on the Zero Hour pre-show. In the event's final match, which was promoted as part of a triple main event, "Hangman" Adam Page defeated Jon Moxley in a Texas Death match to win the AEW World Championship. The second main event, which was the penultimate match, saw AEW Continental Champion Kazuchika Okada defeat AEW International Champion Kenny Omega in a Winner Takes All Championship Unification match to win the inaugural AEW Unified Championship. The first main event saw "Timeless" Toni Storm defeat Mercedes Moné to retain the AEW Women's World Championship. In another prominent match, Swerve Strickland and Will Ospreay defeated The Young Bucks (Matthew Jackson and Nicholas Jackson) in a "High Stakes" tag team match and as a result, The Young Bucks were stripped of their Executive Vice President titles. Prior to the match for the AEW TNT Championship, Adam Cole was forced to vacate the title due to injury, implying the possibility of retirement, scrapping the planned bout between him and Kyle Fletcher in favor of a four-way match between Fletcher, Daniel Garcia, Sammy Guevara, and Dustin Rhodes. The latter won the match, marking his first singles title in AEW. The event also featured the returns of Juice Robinson, The Gunns (Austin Gunn and Colten Gunn), Cope, Bryan Danielson, and Darby Allin, the latter of whom had taken a hiatus to successfully climb Mount Everest.

All In: Texas received generally positive reviews, with high praise directed to the AEW Women's World Championship match, the Unified Championship bout, and the "High Stakes" tag match. The Texas Death Match for the AEW World Championship received high acclaim as a feel-good ending to the PPV and to Moxley's reign as AEW World Champion, though the overall length of the event—eight hours when including the pre-show—was criticized by many reviewers.

== Production ==
=== Background ===
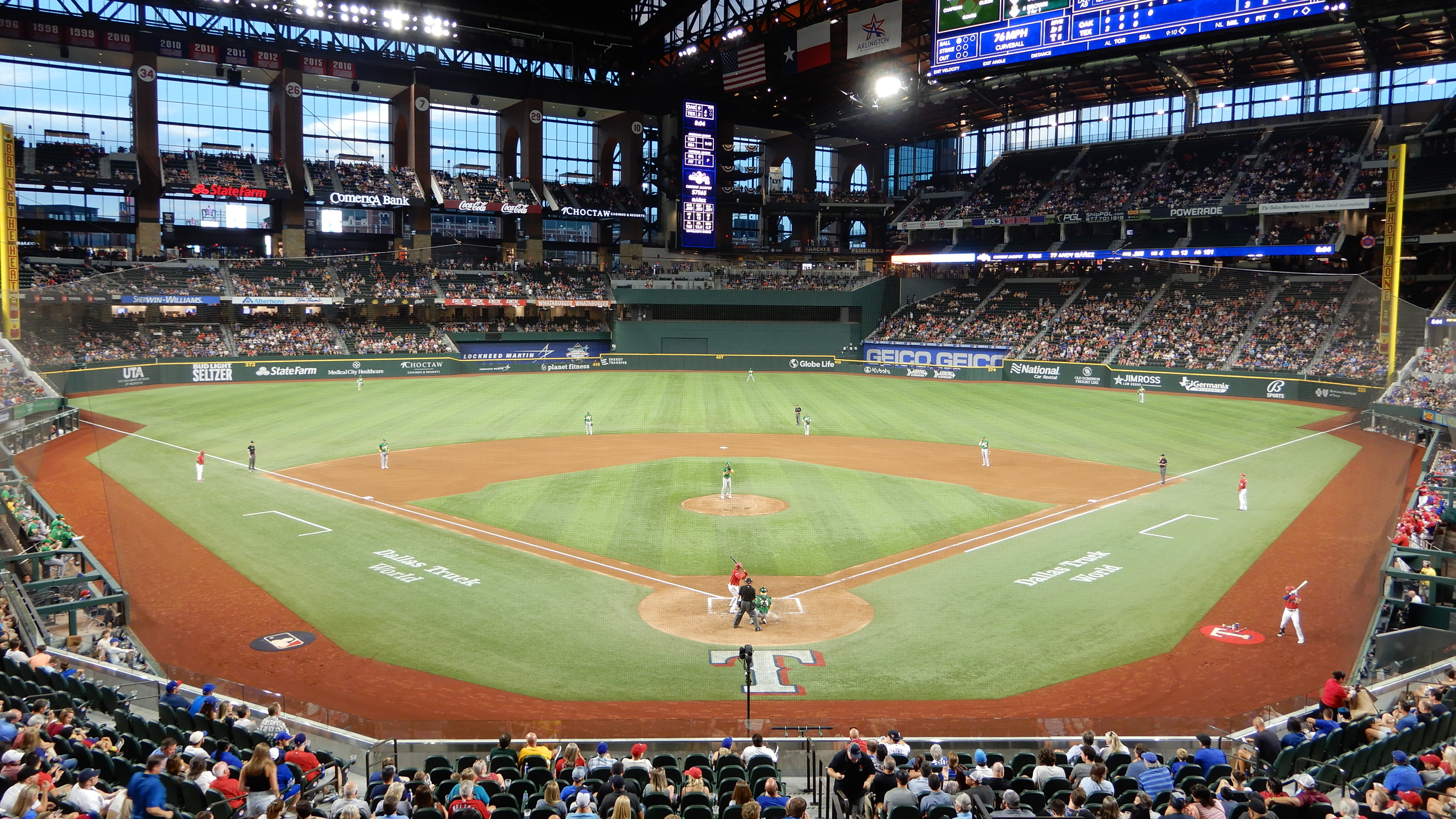
The event was held at Globe Life Field in Arlington, Texas, marking the first professional wrestling event held at the stadium.

All In was first held as an independent professional wrestling pay-per-view (PPV) event in September 2018, and was produced by members of The Elite in association with Ring of Honor (ROH), which retained the rights to All In. The event inspired the formation of the American promotion All Elite Wrestling (AEW) in January 2019, and after AEW president Tony Khan purchased ROH in March 2022, AEW revived All In as their first-ever PPV event held in the United Kingdom, with both the 2023 and 2024 events taking place during the United Kingdom's August Bank Holiday weekend at Wembley Stadium in London, England. All In would become AEW's biggest annual event, subsequently regarded as one of the "big five", along with Double or Nothing, All Out, Full Gear, and Revolution, the company's five biggest annual events.

On August 15, 2024, the third All In by AEW, and fourth overall, was announced to be held at Globe Life Field in Arlington, Texas, on Saturday, July 12, 2025, marking AEW's first PPV event held in an American baseball stadium and in the U.S. state of Texas. All In: Texas was also AEW's first PPV event held in July and subsequently the first professional wrestling event held at Globe Life Field. During an appearance on the Rich Eisen Show just a week before the event, Khan said that they were not at Wembley Stadium for 2025 as the band Coldplay had the venue booked for a tour that ran through the August Bank Holiday weekend.

Tickets for All In: Texas went on sale on December 9, 2024. Additionally, AEW hosted a free kickoff party at the Texas Live! sports bar adjacent to Globe Life Field on November 20, which included a meet-and-greet with wrestlers from AEW and ROH, as well as early access to purchase tickets for All In: Texas.

All In: Texas was originally set to take place during the evening of July 12, but on April 2, 2025, it was announced that All In would instead have a special start time of 2:00 p.m. Central Time (3:00 p.m. Eastern Time) to prevent a direct counterprogramming attempt by WWE's Saturday Night's Main Event XL. However, WWE later scheduled The Great American Bash, a livestreaming event for their NXT brand, to run against All In. Despite the earlier start time, All In's six-hour duration resulted in the last hour overlapping with the first hour of Saturday Night's Main Event XL.

Immediately following the July 10 episode of Collision, TNT and Max simulcast a television special previewing the event titled Countdown to All In.

=== Other All In week events ===
In the week leading up to All In, AEW hosted several events. Both Dynamite and Collision were held live at the Curtis Culwell Center in nearby Garland, Texas, on Wednesday, July 9, and Thursday, July 10, respectively. Collision was preempted from its usual Saturday night time slot due to All In taking place on Saturday. Immediately after Collision, AEW hosted a karaoke show in the Champions Ballroom of the Sheraton Arlington Hotel, where fans could sing karaoke with various AEW wrestlers. The hotel also hosted the fan convention Starrcast on Friday and Saturday, July 11 and 12. AEW's sister promotion ROH hosted their biggest annual pay-per-view, Supercard of Honor, at the Esports Stadium Arlington on July 11. On Saturday morning before All In, AEW kicked off the event with a "Texas Tailgate" inside Texas Live!'s Shift4 Arena. Immediately after All In, there was an "After Party" in The Arlington Backyard of Texas Live!. Both events allowed fans to meet various AEW wrestlers and win prizes.

=== Storylines ===
Other on-screen personnel
Role	Name
Commentators	Excalibur (Pre-show and PPV)
Commentators	Tony Schiavone (Pre-show and PPV)
Commentators	Nigel McGuinness (Pre-show and PPV)
Commentators	Taz (PPV)
Commentators	MVP (Men's Casino Gauntlet match)
Commentators	Matt Menard (TNT Championship match)
Commentators	FTR (Cash Wheeler and Dax Harwood) (World Tag Team Championship match)
Commentators	Don Callis (Okada vs. Omega)
Commentators	Jim Ross (last two matches)
Spanish commentators	Carlos Cabrera
Spanish commentators	Alvaro Riojas
Spanish commentators	Ariel Levy
Ring announcer	Bobby Cruise (Pre-show)
Ring announcer	Arkady Aura (Pre-show+PPV)
Ring announcer	Justin Roberts (PPV)
Referees	Aubrey Edwards
Referees	Bryce Remsburg
Referees	Mike Posey
Referees	Paul Turner
Referees	Rick Knox
Referees	Stephon Smith
Interviewer	Josh Mathews
Pre-show hosts	Renee Paquette
Pre-show hosts	RJ City
Pre-show hosts	Jeff Jarrett
Pre-show hosts	Paul Wight

All In: Texas featured 12 professional wrestling matches, including three on the Zero Hour pre-show, that were the result of pre-existing feuds and storylines, with results being predetermined by AEW's writers. Storylines were produced on AEW's weekly television programs, Dynamite and Collision.

The Owen Hart Cup is an annual professional wrestling tournament held by AEW in partnership with The Owen Hart Foundation in honor of Owen Hart. It consists of two single-elimination tournaments, one each for men and women. The respective winners receive a trophy called "The Owen", a commemorative championship belt, and a world championship match at All In. Both tournament finals occurred at Double or Nothing on May 25, 2025. The women's tournament was won by AEW TBS Champion Mercedes Moné, who defeated Jamie Hayter and earned an AEW Women's World Championship match against reigning champion "Timeless" Toni Storm. Meanwhile, the men's tournament was won by "Hangman" Adam Page, who defeated Will Ospreay and earned an AEW World Championship match against reigning champion Jon Moxley. At Dynamite 300 on July 2, it was confirmed that the bout between Moxley and Hangman would be contested as a Texas Death match.

Upon winning the 2024 Continental Classic at Worlds End on December 28 and retaining the AEW Continental Championship, Kazuchika Okada was confronted by returning long-time rival Kenny Omega, who had been out of action for over a year due to legitimately being diagnosed with diverticulitis which (in kayfabe) had recently been aggravated following an attack by The Elite (Omega's former stable whom Okada had joined by that time). Omega would go on to win the AEW International Championship at Revolution on March 9, 2025. Following a successful title defense at Dynamite: Fyter Fest on June 4, Omega was confronted by Okada. A Winner Takes All match for both the International Championship and the Continental Championship was then subsequently scheduled for All In. During the contract signing the following week at Dynamite: Summer Blockbuster, Tony Schiavone confirmed that the bout would be a championship unification match to unify the titles as the AEW Unified Championship.

On the June 21 episode of Collision, it was announced that a Casino Gauntlet match would be held at All In; it was subsequently revealed that there would be both a men's and women's version of the match with the respective winners receiving a future world championship match. Two four-way matches, one each for the men and women, occurred on the June 25 episode of Dynamite to determine the number one entrants respectively, where Mark Briscoe defeated Bandido, Konosuke Takeshita, and Roderick Strong, and then Kris Statlander defeated Athena, Thunder Rosa, and Willow Nightingale. On July 2 at Dynamite 300, The Hurt Syndicate's MJF defeated Anthony Bowens, AR Fox, and Brody King in a four-way match to become the number two entrant in the men's Gauntlet. On the July 9 episode of Dynamite, Megan Bayne defeated Queen Aminata, Tay Melo, and Thekla in a four-way match to become the number two entrant in the women's Gauntlet.

At Dynasty on April 6, The Young Bucks (Matthew Jackson and Nicholas Jackson) returned after a hiatus since October, and interfered in the main event, assisting Jon Moxley in defeating Swerve Strickland, with Moxley retaining his AEW World Championship. Strickland would feud with both Moxley and his Death Riders stable, and The Young Bucks, culminating in an Anarchy in the Arena match at Double or Nothing on May 25, which Strickland's team won. At Dynamite: Summer Blockbuster on June 11, The Young Bucks renewed their rivalry with Strickland, and attempted to superkick him with shoes that had thumbtacks encrusted on the soles following Strickland's match with Will Ospreay, but Ospreay purposefully moved in front of Strickland and was superkicked instead. On the June 25 episode of Dynamite, Ospreay and Strickland challenged The Young Bucks to a tag team match at All In, but The Young Bucks refused. At Dynamite 300 on July 2, Ospreay and Strickland again challenged The Young Bucks to a match, this time with the added stipulation that if The Young Bucks lost, they would be stripped of their Executive Vice President titles, but if Strickland and Ospreay lost, neither would be able to challenge for the AEW World Championship for one year, and The Young Bucks accepted.

At Dynasty in April, Adam Cole defeated Daniel Garcia to win the AEW TNT Championship. After Double or Nothing in May, Cole began a feud with Kyle Fletcher over the title, with Cole defeating Fletcher via disqualification on the May 28 episode of Dynamite. At Collision 100 on July 5, Fletcher defeated Garcia to become the #1 contender for the AEW TNT Championship at All In. However, during the All In Zero Hour pre-show, it was confirmed by AEW president Tony Khan that Cole was legitimately injured and could not be cleared for his TNT Championship defense. The match was subsequently changed to a four-way match for the vacant title between Fletcher, Garcia, Dustin Rhodes, and Sammy Guevara.

On the June 25 episode of Dynamite, the newly formed tag team of JetSpeed ("Speedball" Mike Bailey and Kevin Knight) defeated Ricochet and AR Fox. After the match, JetSpeed called out the AEW World Tag Team Champions, The Hurt Syndicate (Bobby Lashley and Shelton Benjamin), and challenged them to a match at All In, before being ambushed from behind by them. The match was subsequently made official for All In. On the July 5 episode of Collision, it was confirmed that The Patriarchy (Christian Cage and Nick Wayne) would also be in the match, making it a three-way tag team match.

At Dynamite: Spring BreakThru on April 16, The Opps (Samoa Joe, Katsuyori Shibata, and Powerhouse Hobbs) defeated Death Riders (Claudio Castagnoli, Wheeler Yuta, and Jon Moxley; the latter was filling in for a legitimately injured Pac) to win the AEW World Trios Championship. On May 14 at Dynamite: Beach Break, Moxley successfully defended the AEW World Championship against Joe in a Steel Cage match after interference from the Death Riders and Gabe Kidd. This led to an Anarchy in the Arena match at Double or Nothing between The Opps' team and the Death Rider's team, where the former team won despite Kidd's interference. On July 5 at Collision 100, Castagnoli and Yuta challenged The Opps for their AEW World Trios Championships at All In. On the July 9 episode of Dynamite, Kidd returned, and it was subsequently confirmed on the same episode that the title match was official with Kidd teaming with Castagnoli and Yuta.

== Reception ==
The event as a whole received generally positive reviews, with particularly positive reactions directed towards each of the three main events, along with the High Stakes tag team bout. Reviewing the event for TJRwrestling, John Canton gave the event an overall score of 8 out of 10. He referred to the entire suite of matches as "good", with the quality increasing to culminate in the final three matches which he deemed "excellent", though noted that he did not find any of the matches to be better than Page and Ospreay's bout at Double or Nothing, which he had ranked as AEW's best match of the year at the time. Writing for 411Mania, Kevin Pantoja also gave the show a score of 8 out of 10. He overall described All In as "a hell of a show that ended with a barrage of bangers", but criticized the quality of matches that ran too long, specifically naming the TNT and Tag Team Championship bouts, along with the Men's Casino Gauntlet match. Chris Mueller, reviewing for Bleacher Report, gave the show a score of an "A".

The final main event of Jon Moxley vs. "Hangman" Adam Page for the AEW World Championship received acclaim as a feel-good ending to the show, and finale of Moxley's reign as champion. Canton praised the decisive finish of the match, with Page utilizing a chain to hang Moxley so "Moxley had to tap out" underlined Page's victory. Pantoja described the match as "incredible", positively noting it as "overbooked in the best possible way with the right outcome in the end". He specifically noted that he was not fond of the Death Riders storyline, but found it "beautiful" that such a wonderful ending could come from it. Dave Meltzer, reviewing the match for the Wrestling Observer Newsletter, gave the match 5.5 stars, tying it as his best match of the night. Mueller praised the match, stating that Moxley and Page "stole the show", while noting the violence may be off-putting to some.

The event as a whole received criticism for its extended length. Coupled with the two hour pre-show, All In: Texas ran more than eight hours. Canton noted that the crowd was "dead" for several matches due to the length, which Pantoja echoed as causing several matches to suffer in quality from extended length.

For the other matches, Dave Meltzer rated the opening eight-man tag team match 2.25 stars, the eight-man tag team match featuring "Big Boom!" A.J. 3 stars, FTR vs. Outrunners 3 stars, the AEW World Trios Championship match 3.75 stars, the men's and women's Casino Gauntlet matches both 4 stars, the vacant TNT Championship four-way match 3 stars, the AEW World Tag Team Championship three-way match 4 stars, Ospreay and Strickland vs. Young Bucks 5.5 stars, the AEW Women's World Championship match 4.75 stars, and the AEW Unified Championship match 4.75 stars.

== Aftermath ==
Due to Kazuchika Okada winning as the Continental Champion, the Unified Championship adopted the former's Continental Rules (20-minute time limit, no one allowed at ringside, and outside interference strictly prohibited). Okada defended the Unified, Continental, and International titles as one championship between All In and the 2025 Continental Classic. The tournament itself was only for the Continental Championship, meaning if Okada lost, he would also have to vacate the Unified Championship. In the final of the Continental Classic at Worlds End on December 27, 2025, Okada lost to Jon Moxley, forcing him to relinquish the Unified Championship, rendering it inactive.

== Results ==
No.	Results	Stipulations	Times
1^{P}	Sons of Texas (Dustin Rhodes, Marshall Von Erich, Ross Von Erich, and Sammy Guevara) (with Kevin Von Erich) defeated Shane Taylor Promotions (Shane Taylor, Lee Moriarty, Carlie Bravo, and Capt. Shawn Dean) (with Anthony Ogogo and Trish Adora) by pinfall	Eight-man tag team match	7:15
2^{P}	"Big Boom!" A.J. and The Conglomeration (Kyle O'Reilly, Hologram, and Tomohiro Ishii) (with Big Justice and The Rizzler) defeated Don Callis Family (Lance Archer, Rocky Romero, Trent Beretta and Hechicero) by pinfall	Eight-man tag team match	12:45
3^{P}	FTR (Cash Wheeler and Dax Harwood) (with Stokely) defeated The Outrunners (Truth Magnum and Turbo Floyd) by pinfall	Tag team match	16:10
4	The Opps (Samoa Joe, Katsuyori Shibata, and Powerhouse Hobbs) (c) defeated Gabe Kidd and Death Riders (Claudio Castagnoli and Wheeler Yuta) by pinfall	Trios match for the AEW World Trios Championship	14:10
5	MJF (with MVP) won by pinning Roderick Strong (Note: Order of entrants: Mark Briscoe, MJF, Ricochet, Bandido, Konosuke Takeshita, Místico, Josh Alexander, Anthony Bowens, Roderick Strong, Brody King, Juice Robinson, Kota Ibushi, The Beast Mortos, and Max Caster.)	Men's Casino Gauntlet match for a future AEW World Championship match	34:55
6	Dustin Rhodes defeated Sammy Guevara, Daniel Garcia (with Matt Menard), and Kyle Fletcher (with Don Callis) by pinfall	Four-way match for the vacant AEW TNT Championship (Note: This was originally scheduled as a singles match in which Adam Cole was to defend the title against Kyle Fletcher before Cole had to relinquish the title on the pre-show due to injury.)	15:45
7	Swerve Strickland and Will Ospreay (with Prince Nana) defeated The Young Bucks (Matthew Jackson and Nicholas Jackson) by pinfall	Tag team match Since The Young Bucks lost, they were stripped of their Executive Vice President titles. Had Ospreay and Strickland lost, they would have not been able to challenge for the AEW World Championship for one year.	25:50
8	Athena won by pinning Mina Shirakawa (Note: Order of entrants: Kris Statlander, Megan Bayne, Willow Nightingale, Tay Melo, Thekla, Julia Hart, Queen Aminata, Mina Shirakawa, Athena, Thunder Rosa, Syuri, and Alex Windsor.)	Women's Casino Gauntlet match for a future AEW Women's World Championship match	27:00
9	The Hurt Syndicate (Bobby Lashley and Shelton Benjamin) (c) (with MJF and MVP) defeated JetSpeed (Kevin Knight and Mike Bailey) and The Patriarchy (Christian Cage and Nick Wayne) (with Kip Sabian and Mother Wayne) by pinfall	Three-way tag team match for the AEW World Tag Team Championship	18:40
10	"Timeless" Toni Storm (c) (with Luther) defeated Mercedes Moné by pinfall	Singles match for the AEW Women's World Championship	24:10
11	Kazuchika Okada (Continental) (with Don Callis) defeated Kenny Omega (International) (with Kota Ibushi) by pinfall	Winner Takes All match to unify the AEW Continental Championship and AEW International Championship as the inaugural AEW Unified Championship	30:32
12	"Hangman" Adam Page defeated Jon Moxley (c) (with Marina Shafir) by submission	Texas Death match for the AEW World Championship	35:55
(c) / – the champion(s) heading into the match; P / – the match was broadcast on the pre-show
