= All In (2024) =

All Elite Wrestling pay-per-view event

All In: London
- Promotional poster featuring various AEW wrestlers
- Promotion: All Elite Wrestling
- Date: August 25, 2024
- City: London, England
- Venue: Wembley Stadium
- Attendance: 46,476 (Note: Turnstile attendance, which reflects the amount of tickets used for admission, was recorded at 46,476 by Brent Council. Tickets distributed, which reflects complimentary and sold tickets, was reported at 53,385.)
- Buy rate: 170,000

Pay-per-view chronology
← Previous; Forbidden Door	Next → All Out

All In chronology
← Previous; 2023	Next → 2025

AEW in the United Kingdom chronology
← Previous; All In	Next → Forbidden Door

The 2024 All In, also promoted as All In: London at Wembley Stadium or simply All In: London, was a professional wrestling pay-per-view (PPV) event produced by the American promotion All Elite Wrestling (AEW). It was the second annual All In by AEW, and third All In overall. The event took place on August 25, 2024, at Wembley Stadium in London, England, coinciding with the United Kingdom's August Bank Holiday weekend.

Twelve matches were contested at the event, including three on the Zero-Hour pre-show. In the main event, Bryan Danielson defeated Swerve Strickland in a Title vs. Career match to win the AEW World Championship, making him the fourth wrestler to win the AEW World Championship and WWE Championship. In other prominent matches, Mercedes Moné defeated Dr. Britt Baker, D.M.D. to retain the AEW TBS Championship, Will Ospreay defeated MJF to win the AEW International Championship, and Mariah May defeated "Timeless" Toni Storm to win the AEW Women's World Championship. The event also featured the AEW debut of former WWE wrestler Ricochet, the return of Jamie Hayter, who had been out with an injury since May 2023, and appearances by former AEW wrestler Sting and independent wrestlers Grizzled Young Veterans (James Drake and Zack Gibson). The event also featured the in-ring return of English wrestler and London native Nigel McGuinness following his retirement in 2011 and subsequent transition into color commentary.

The event received positive reviews. In particular, the main event bout between Danielson and Strickland received widespread acclaim. Whilst many of the championship matches received positive reviews—especially the International Championship and Women's Championship bouts—the FTW match between Hook and Jericho, along with the TBS Championship bout between Mone and Baker, earnt a more mixed reception.

== Production ==
=== Background ===
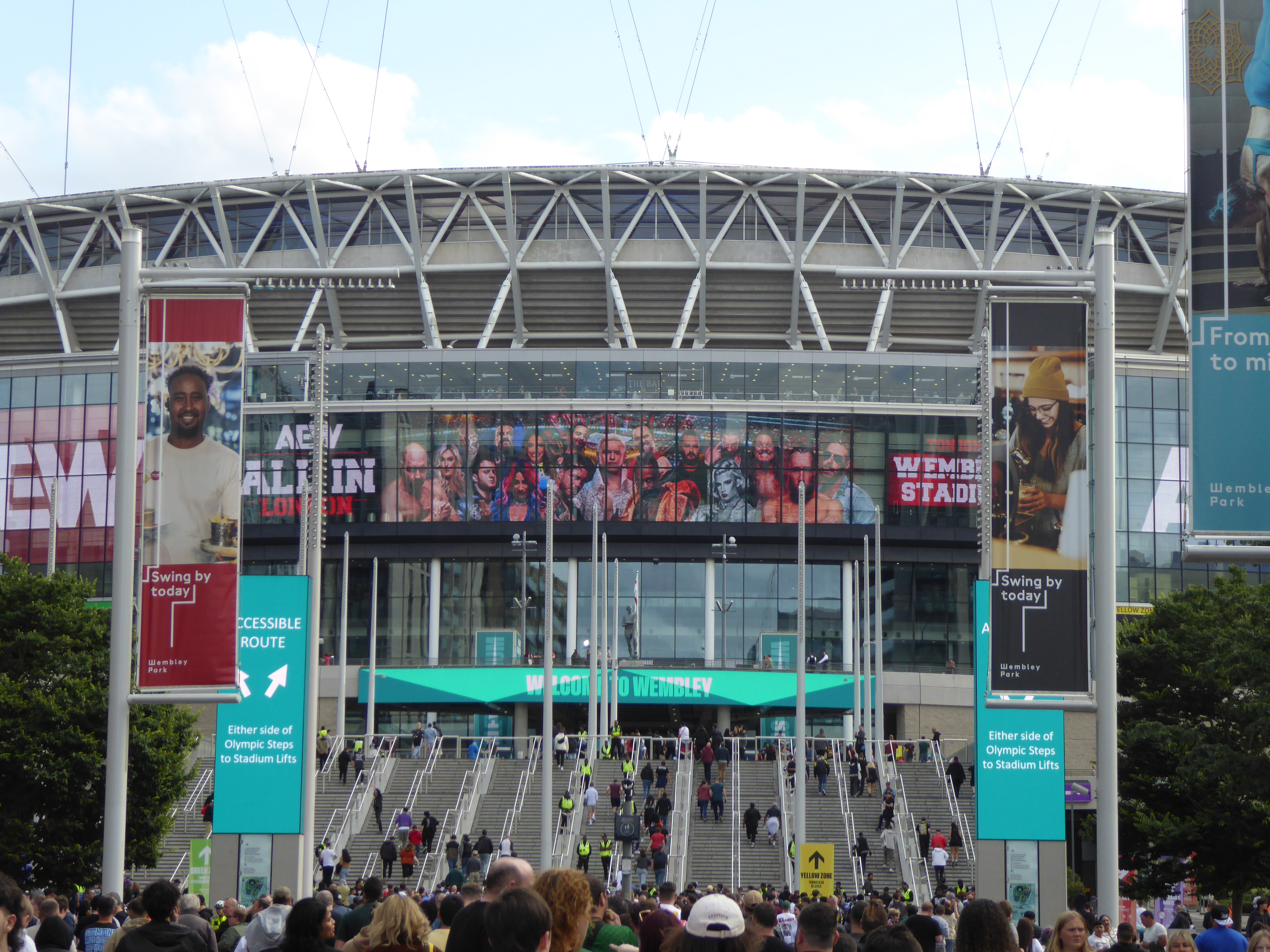
The event was held at Wembley Stadium in London, England for a second consecutive year.

All In was first held as an independent professional wrestling PPV event in September 2018, and was produced by members of The Elite in association with Ring of Honor (ROH), which retained the rights to All In. The event inspired the formation of the American promotion All Elite Wrestling (AEW) in January 2019, and after AEW president Tony Khan purchased ROH in March 2022, AEW revived All In as their first-ever PPV event held in the United Kingdom, which took place during the 2023 August Bank Holiday weekend at Wembley Stadium in London, England. At the conclusion of the 2023 event, AEW announced that All In would return to Wembley Stadium on August 25, 2024. Tickets went on sale on December 1, 2023. The day before the event on Saturday, August 24, AEW hosted a fan event called All In Celebration. The event was held at Boxpark Wembley and featured music, early access to All In merchandise, and several stage shows, interviews, and content featuring various AEW wrestlers.

=== Storylines ===
All In London at Wembley Stadium featured professional wrestling matches that were the result of pre-existing feuds and storylines, with results being predetermined by AEW's writers. Storylines were produced on AEW's weekly television programs, Dynamite, Collision, and Rampage, and the YouTube series Being The Dark Order. The Owen Hart Cup is an annual professional wrestling tournament held by AEW in partnership with The Owen Hart Foundation in honor of Owen Hart. It consists of two single-elimination tournaments, one each for men and women, and the respective winners receive a trophy called "The Owen" as well as a commemorative championship belt. During Double or Nothing on May 26, AEW president Tony Khan and Owen's widow Martha announced that the respective 2024 cup winners would also earn a world championship match at All In. Both tournament finals occurred on the July 10 episode of Dynamite in Owen's hometown of Calgary, Alberta, Canada.

The women's Owen Hart Foundation Tournament was won by Mariah May. After losing the AEW Women's World Championship at Dynamite 200 in August 2023, Toni Storm underwent a shift in character; her new persona was that of a paranoid Golden Age of Hollywood starlet, similar to the character of Norma Desmond in the 1950 film Sunset Boulevard. Storm would take on the epithet of "Timeless" Toni Storm starting in October 2023, and would be accompanied by her "butler" Luther, who was portraying a similar role to that of Sunset Boulevard's Max von Mayerling, with Storm being billed from Stage 7 at Warner Bros. Studios. In November, World Wonder Ring Stardom wrestler Mariah May debuted as a heel and a "superfan" of Storm; while initially dismissive of May, Storm later took May on as her "understudy", and Storm regained the AEW Women's World Championship at Full Gear that month. Subsequently, at Revolution in March 2024, May took on Storm's old "rockstar" gimmick. Throughout the following months, Storm and May's relationship developed romantic overtones, and as a gift, Storm entered May into the Owen Hart Cup: May would defeat 2023 winner Willow Nightingale in the tournament final to earn a match against Storm for the AEW Women's World Championship at All In. After the match, May turned on Storm, hitting her with the Owen Hart Cup championship belt and bloodying her in the process; this explicitly aligned May's persona to the character of Eve Harrington in the 1950 film All About Eve, whose primary ambition in the film was to supplant Margo Channing—another inspiration for Storm's character—as a Hollywood star. May subsequently took on the epithet "The Glamour" Mariah May.

The men's Owen Hart tournament was won by Bryan Danielson. Danielson, who made his AEW debut at the 2021 All Out, previously challenged for the AEW World Championship at Revolution in 2023, but was unsuccessful in the bout. In a backstage interview on the following Dynamite, Danielson teased a possible retirement storyline; he said the championship match made him realize he was putting wrestling ahead of his family. On the September 9, 2023, episode of Collision, Danielson confirmed that 2024 would be his last year as a full-time wrestler. Throughout the following year, Danielson would suffer a losing streak in marquee matches, which included losing in the 2023 Continental Classic tournament, losses in high-profile singles matches at New Japan Pro-Wrestling's (NJPW) Wrestle Kingdom 18 and AEW's Dynasty, and being on the losing team in the Anarchy in the Arena match at Double or Nothing. As a result, on the June 6 episode of Dynamite, Danielson became the first wrestler to declare for the 2024 Owen Hart Cup and vowed to "go out on top". Danielson would then go on to win the tournament, defeating "Hangman" Adam Page—who himself was seeking vengeance against his rival, reigning AEW World Champion Swerve Strickland—in the tournament final. On the July 31 episode of Dynamite, Danielson said if he did not defeat Strickland and win the AEW World Championship at All In, he would never wrestle again; they subsequently agreed that the stipulation would be a Title vs. Career match.

At Dynamite 250 on July 17, MJF defeated Will Ospreay to win the AEW International Championship. The following week, MJF threw the International Championship belt in the trash and replaced it with his own custom championship belt, which he unofficially renamed as the American Championship. Ospreay interrupted and announced that he would be facing MJF in a rematch for the title at All In. On the July 31 episode, Ospreay said that after he regained the title, he would restore it as the International Championship.

At Double or Nothing, Darby Allin joined Team AEW against The Elite, but Team AEW were defeated by The Elite in the Anarchy in the Arena match, a match in which Allin set Elite member Jack Perry on fire with a flamethrower. After taking a brief hiatus, Allin returned on the July 10 episode of Dynamite and attacked Elite member Brandon Cutler to send a warning to The Elite. Allin again joined Team AEW against The Elite for the Blood and Guts match at Dynamite: Blood & Guts. Team AEW won by way of Allin causing The Elite to forfeit by threatening to set Perry on fire, who Allin had handcuffed to the cage, while simultaneously making The Elite agree to give him a match against Perry for the AEW TNT Championship at All In. After a backstage brawl on the August 14 episode, Perry declared he would defend the title against Allin in a Coffin match, which was made official.

After Mercedes Moné retained the AEW TBS Championship at Forbidden Door, where she simultaneously won the NJPW Strong Women's Championship, Moné's celebration was interrupted by the returning Dr. Britt Baker, D.M.D., who had been out since September 2023. On the following Dynamite, Baker explained that she had been out for 10 months due to a diagnosis of a Transient Ischemic Attack. She was then interrupted by Moné, after which, Baker challenged Moné to a championship match at All In, but Moné declined. However, after a confrontation between the two during AEW's panel at San Diego Comic-Con on July 25, Tony Khan officially scheduled Moné to defend the TBS Championship against Baker at All In.

== Event ==
Other on-screen personnel
Role	Name
Commentators	Excalibur (Pre-show and PPV)
Commentators	Tony Schiavone (Pre-show and PPV)
Commentators	Taz (PPV)
Commentators	Nigel McGuinness (first two PPV matches)
Commentators	Jim Ross (Main event)
Commentators	Matt Menard (Pre-show)
Commentators	Don Callis (16-man tag team match)
Ring announcers	Justin Roberts (PPV)
Ring announcers	Bobby Cruise (Pre-show)
Referees	Aubrey Edwards
Referees	Bryce Remsburg
Referees	Mike Posey
Referees	Paul Turner
Referees	Rick Knox
Referees	Stephon Smith
Interviewers	Lexy Nair
Interviewers	Arkady Aura
Pre-show hosts	Renee Paquette
Pre-show hosts	RJ City
Pre-show hosts	Jeff Jarrett
Pre-show hosts	Madison Rayne

=== Pre-show ===
The opening bout, which aired on the pre-show, was a 16-man tag team match pitting Anthony Ogogo, Ariya Daivari, The Dark Order, Jay Lethal, Private Party, and Satnam Singh against Action Andretti, Kip Sabian, Kyle Fletcher, Lio Rush, Rocky Romero, Tommy Billington, and Top Flight. The team of Andretti, Sabian, Fletcher, Rush, Romero, Billington, and Top Flight won the match after Dante Martin of Top Flight pinned Daivari with a diving splash. The second bout, which aired on the pre-show, was a mixed tag team match pitting Kris Statlander and Stokely Hathaway against Willow Nightingale and Tomohiro Ishii. The match ended when Ishii pinned Hathaway following a sliding lariat.

The third bout, which aired on the pre-show, was a 10-man tag team match pitting Dustin Rhodes, Katsuyori Shibata, Marshall and Ross Von Erich (accompanied by their father, Kevin Von Erich) and Sammy Guevara against Cage of Agony and Undisputed Kingdom. The match ended when Guevara executed a diving senton on Matt Taven of Undisputed Kingdom, enabling Rhodes to pin Taven. Following the match, a brawl broke out, promoting Kevin Von Erich to enter the ring and apply the Iron Claw to Taven. Following the third bout, Saraya came to the ring with her family (including her mother, Sweet Saraya) and Harley Cameron to complain about not having a match on the pay-per-view and threaten to disrupt the show. They were driven off by the returning Jamie Hayter.

=== Pay-per-view ===
The fourth bout, and the first match to air on the pay-per-view broadcast proper, saw AEW World Trios Champions The Patriarchy defend their titles against Bang Bang Gang, House of Black, and the team of Claudio Castagnoli, Pac, and Wheeler Yuta. The match started with everyone focusing on The Patriarchy. Before they could attack him Christian Cage left the ring, leaving Killswitch and Nick Wayne alone. He came back down after everyone was down and tried to climb the ladder. He was then thrown onto everyone and was beaten up by everyone on the stage ramp. While everyone was attacking him, Mother Wayne tried to climb the ladder and grab the titles for The Patriarchy before being stopped by Austin Gunn and Colten Gunn. Killswitch came back and chokeslamed everyone. He then tried to climb the ladder, but Christian stopped him and climbed the ladder himself. The match ended when Pac retrieved the title belts from the top of the ladder.

The fifth match saw AEW Women's World Champion "Timeless" Toni Storm defend her title against Mariah May. May defeated Storm to win the title by giving her a piledriver and pinning her. The sixth bout saw FTW Champion Chris Jericho defend his title against Hook in a Last Chance match. Towards the end of the match, Jericho's stablemate Bryan Keith attempted to interfere, but was foiled when Hook's father Taz (who was providing color commentary at ringside) locked him in the Tazmission, enabling Hook to apply the Red Rum to Jericho and force him to submit. The seventh bout was a three-way tag team match in which AEW World Tag Team Champions the Young Bucks defended their titles against The Acclaimed and FTR. The Young Bucks won the match and retained their titles by pinning Dax Harwood of FTR following an EVP Trigger. Following the match, the Grizzled Young Veterans came to the ring and confronted the Young Bucks, only to instead attack FTR.

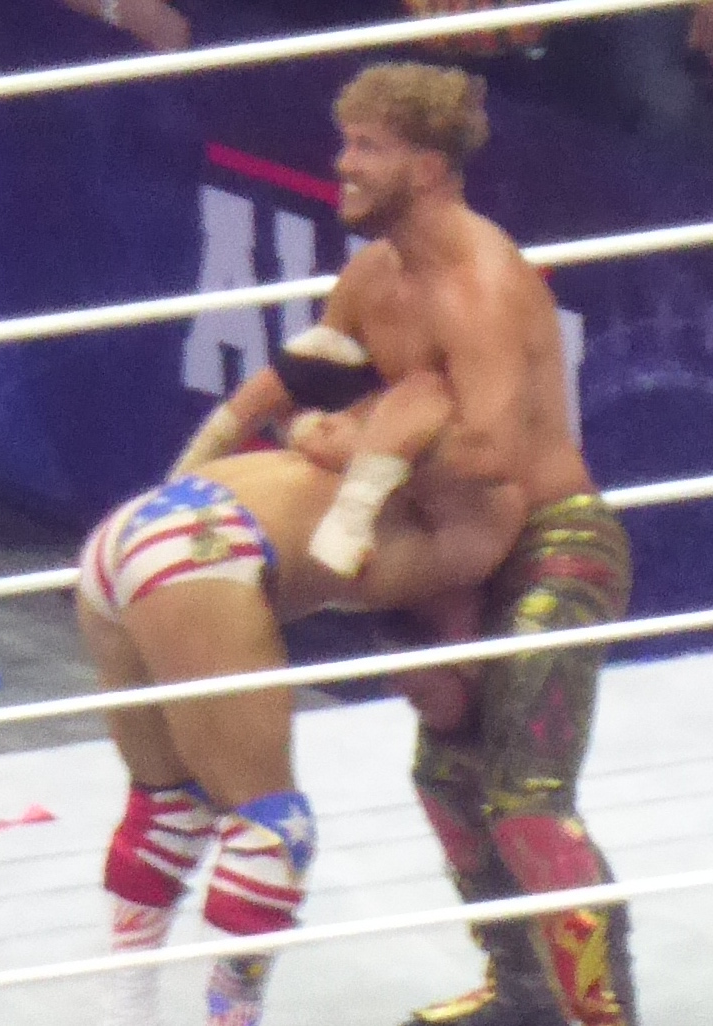
Will Ospreay defeated MJF for the AEW International Championship following a Tiger Driver '91 at All In.

The eighth bout was a Casino Gauntlet match, with the winner receiving a AEW World Championship match at a time of their choosing. The contestants were, in order of entry, Orange Cassidy, Kazuchika Okada, Nigel McGuinness (wrestling his first match since 2011), Kyle O'Reilly, Zack Sabre Jr., Roderick Strong, Mark Briscoe, "Hangman" Adam Page, Jeff Jarrett, Ricochet (making his unannounced debut), Christian Cage, and Killswitch. When Zack Saber Jr. came out, he and Nigel had a brief face off. Adam Page attempted to attack Karen Jarrett, but was stopped by Ricochet making his debut. Christian Cage came out and was immediately taken out by Ricochet who dived on him as be made his way to the ring. Karen distracted Page so Jeff Jarrett could hit him with his guitar. Then everyone hit their finishers on each other. Killswitch came out announced as Luchasaurus. He was about to chokeslam Cage, but chokeslammed O'Reilly instead. He then put Cage on top of O'Reilly for the win.

The ninth bout was a singles match in which MJF defended the AEW International Championship against Will Ospreay. The match ended when Daniel Garcia prevented MJF from hitting Ospreay with brass knuckles, enabling Ospreay to give MJF a Tiger Driver '91 and pin him to win the title. The tenth bout was a singles match in which AEW TBS Champion Mercedes Moné defended her title against Dr. Britt Baker, D.M.D.. Moné won the match by pinfall following a DDT after sending Baker into a backbreaker ("Moné Maker"). The eleventh bout was a coffin match in which AEW TNT Champion Jack Perry defended his title against Darby Allin. Perry won the bout by enclosing Allin in the coffin. Following the match, Perry and the Young Bucks seemingly attempted to burn Allin alive within the coffin, but were driven off by a returning Sting in his first appearance since Revolution in March 2024.

=== Main event ===
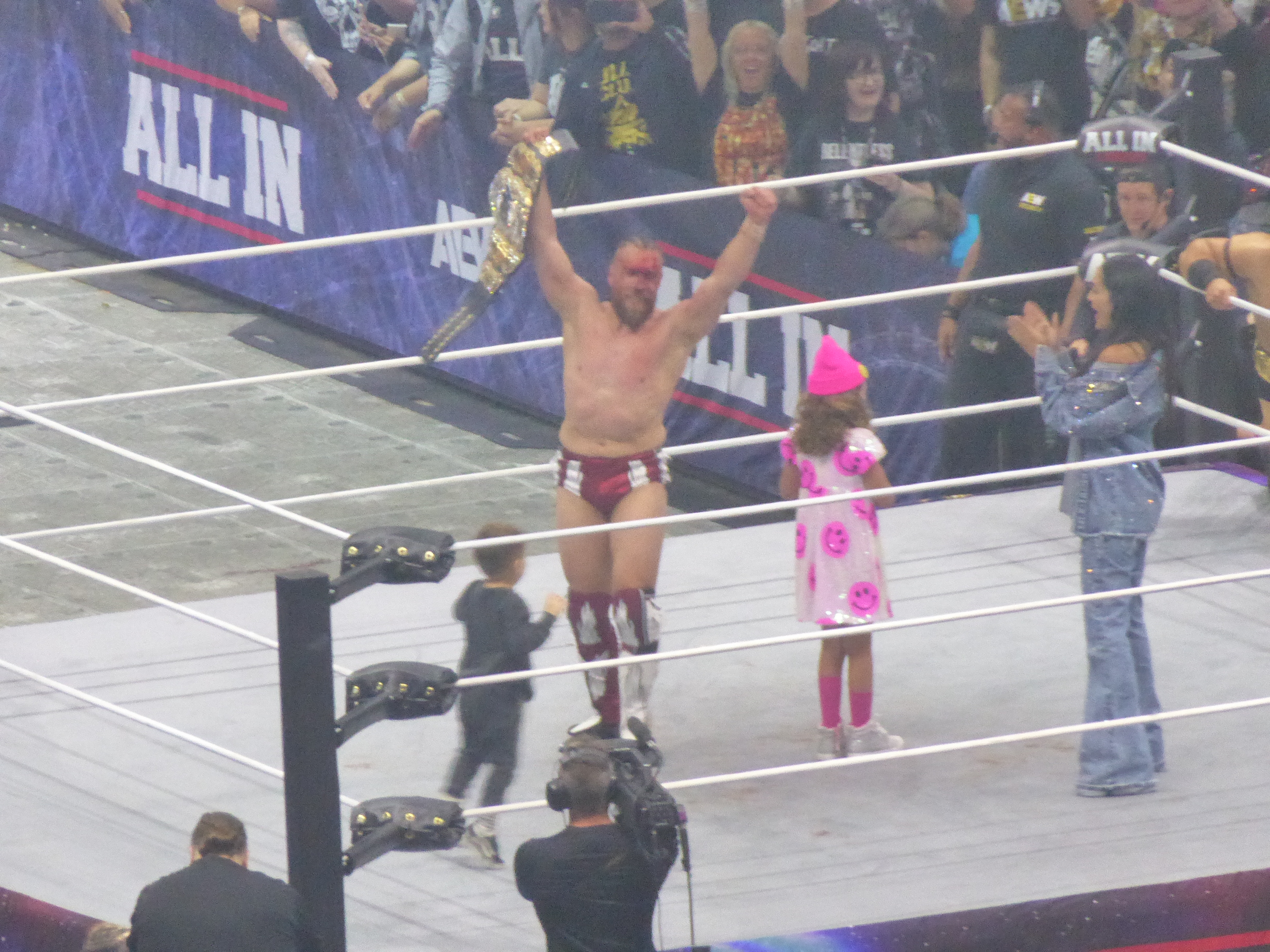
Bryan Danielson won the AEW World Championship at All In.

The main event was a title vs. career match pitting Swerve Strickland's AEW World Championship against Bryan Danielson's career. The match ended when Adam Page distracted Strickland, enabling Danielson to apply the LeBell Lock to Strickland before transitioning into the Rings of Saturn and force him to submit. The event ended with Danielson celebrating with his newly-won championship with his family.

== Reception ==
Wrestling journalist Dave Meltzer of the Wrestling Observer Newsletter rated the following matches: The four-way trios match for the AEW World Trios Championship in a London ladder match at 4.5 stars, Toni Storm vs Mariah May for the AEW Women's World Championship at 4.75 stars, the three-way tag team match for the World Tag Team Titles at 4.25 stars, Chris Jericho vs Hook for the FTW Championship at 3 stars, the Casino Gauntlet match at 4.5 stars, MJF vs Will Ospreay for the International Championship at 5 stars, Mercedes Mone vs Britt Baker for the TBS Championship at 2.5 stars (the lowest on the card), Jack Perry vs Darby Allin in a Coffin Match for the TNT Championship at 2.75 stars, and Swerve Strickland vs Bryan Danielson for the AEW World Championship at 5.25 (the highest on the card). Nikki Garcia said on her podcast The Nikki & Brie Show, hosted along with her sister Brie, that she was "in awe" of All In and the women's world championship match.

== Results ==
No.	Results	Stipulations	Times
1^{P}	Action Andretti, Kip Sabian, Kyle Fletcher, Lio Rush, Rocky Romero, Tommy Billington, and Top Flight (Dante Martin and Darius Martin) (with Don Callis) defeated Ariya Daivari, Anthony Ogogo, The Dark Order (John Silver and Alex Reynolds), Jay Lethal, Private Party (Isiah Kassidy and Marq Quen), and Satnam Singh (with Evil Uno and Sonjay Dutt) by pinfall	16-man tag team match	11:35
2^{P}	Tomohiro Ishii and Willow Nightingale defeated Kris Statlander and Stokely Hathaway by pinfall	Mixed tag team match Since Nightingale and Ishii won, they got to choose the stipulation of the match between Nightingale and Statlander at All Out.	8:10
3^{P}	The Sons of Texas (Dustin Rhodes, Sammy Guevara, Marshall Von Erich, and Ross Von Erich) and Katsuyori Shibata (with Kevin Von Erich) defeated Cage of Agony (Bishop Kaun, Brian Cage, and Toa Liona) and Undisputed Kingdom (Matt Taven and Mike Bennett) by pinfall	10-man tag team match	11:10
4	Blackpool Combat Club (Claudio Castagnoli and Wheeler Yuta) and Pac defeated The Patriarchy (Christian Cage, Killswitch, and Nick Wayne) (c) (with Mother Wayne), Bang Bang Gang (Austin Gunn, Colten Gunn, and Juice Robinson), and House of Black (Brody King, Buddy Matthews, and Malakai Black)	Four-way London Ladder match for the AEW World Trios Championship	18:50
5	Mariah May defeated "Timeless" Toni Storm (c) (with Luther) by pinfall	Singles match for the AEW Women's World Championship	15:15
6	Hook defeated Chris Jericho (c) (with Big Bill and Bryan Keith) by submission	Last Chance match for the FTW Championship; Had Hook lost, he would have never been able to challenge for the title again for as long as Jericho was champion.	10:15
7	The Young Bucks (Matthew Jackson and Nicholas Jackson) (c) defeated The Acclaimed (Anthony Bowens and Max Caster) (with Billy Gunn) and FTR (Cash Wheeler and Dax Harwood) by pinfall	Three-way tag team match for the AEW World Tag Team Championship	13:32
8	Christian Cage won by pinning Kyle O'Reilly (Note: Order of entrants: Orange Cassidy, Kazuchika Okada, Nigel McGuinness, Kyle O'Reilly, Zack Sabre Jr., Roderick Strong, Mark Briscoe, "Hangman" Adam Page, Jeff Jarrett, Ricochet, Christian Cage, and Luchasaurus)	12-man Casino Gauntlet match for a future AEW World Championship match	26:00
9	Will Ospreay defeated MJF (c) by pinfall	Singles match for the AEW International Championship (Note: Going into the match, the title was unofficially being referred to as the AEW American Championship. It was restored as the International Championship upon Ospreay's victory.)	25:50
10	Mercedes Moné (c) (with Kamille) defeated Dr. Britt Baker, D.M.D. by pinfall	Singles match for the AEW TBS Championship	17:25
11	Jack Perry (c) defeated Darby Allin	Coffin match for the AEW TNT Championship	10:40
12	Bryan Danielson defeated Swerve Strickland (c) (with Prince Nana) by submission	Title vs. Career match for the AEW World Championship	26:00
(c) / – the champion(s) heading into the match; P / – the match was broadcast on the pre-show
