= Kip Sabian =

English professional wrestler (born 1992)

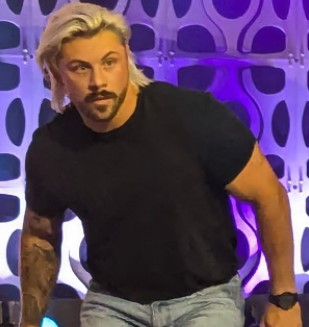
- Sabian in 2024

Personal information
- Born: Simon James Kippen; 19 May 1992 (age 34) Great Yarmouth, Norfolk, England
- Spouse: Penelope Ford (m. 2021)

Professional wrestling career
- Ring name(s): Kip Sabian; Kip Sabin
- Billed height: 5 ft 11 in (180 cm)
- Billed weight: 183 lb (83 kg)
- Billed from: Gorleston, Norfolk, England; Great Yarmouth, England
- Trained by: World Association of Wrestling
- Debut: 31 October 2010

Simon James Kippen (born 19 May 1992), better known by the ring name Kip Sabian, is an English professional wrestler. He is signed to All Elite Wrestling (AEW).

== Early life ==
Simon James Kippen was born in Great Yarmouth on 19 May 1992. Before entering the formal world of professional wrestling, Kippen engaged in backyard wrestling alongside friend and future peer Will Ospreay, and also befriended future professional wrestler Saraya.

== Professional wrestling career ==
=== Early career (2010–2019) ===
Sabian began his career with the World Association of Wrestling after graduating from the promotion's wrestling school. He competed throughout England and Europe, capturing various titles including the IPW:UK World Championship and World Of Sport Wrestling Tag Team Championship. In 2018, he debuted for Ring of Honor. He also had a tag-team "Super Brotheys" with Pakistani wrestler Amir Jordan.

=== All Elite Wrestling (2019–present) ===
==== Various feuds (2019–2024) ====
In February 2019, Sabian signed with All Elite Wrestling. Sabian made his AEW debut at Double or Nothing where he defeated Sammy Guevara in AEW's first ever singles match.

In late December, Sabian established himself as a heel after calling out members of The Elite, facing off against Kenny Omega on 10 December 2019 episode of Dark and Cody on 30 January 2020 episode of Dynamite, losing both matches. Sabian would also start to be managed by his real-life girlfriend Penelope Ford as he began feuding with Joey Janela, defeating him on 5 February episode of Dynamite but lost a falls count anywhere match on 25 February episode of Dark.

On 15 April episode of Dynamite, Sabian began teaming with Jimmy Havoc after Havoc delivered a DDT to Orange Cassidy on the floor during his match against Chuck Taylor. The following week, Sabian took part in a tournament to crown the inaugural AEW TNT Champion, losing to Dustin Rhodes in the first round. Sabian and Havoc made their tag team debut losing to Best Friends in a no disqualification, no count-out tag team match on 29 April episode of Dynamite. They would subsequently call themselves The Superbad Squad. They defeated SoCal Uncensored's Frankie Kazarian and Scorpio Sky in a number one contender's match for the AEW World Tag Team Championship on 27 May episode of Dynamite. They faced the champions Kenny Omega and "Hangman" Adam Page on the following week's Dynamite for the titles in a losing effort. Sabian and Havoc's team ended when Havoc was released by AEW on 13 August.

At All Out, Sabian announced that he and Ford were getting married while also teasing that he will reveal who his best man is for the wedding on the following Dynamite. On 9 September 2020 episode of Dynamite, Miro was revealed to be the best man for Sabian and Ford's wedding. In October, Sabian and Miro began feuding with Best Friends after Trent accidentally destroyed the arcade game that Miro had purchased for Sabian as a wedding gift. This culminated in an Arcade Anarchy match on 31 March 2021 episode of Dynamite, where they were defeated. On the 28 April episode of Dynamite, Miro turned on Sabian by attacking him backstage, thus ending their partnership. On 17 May, Sabian underwent shoulder surgery thus rendering him out of action for over a year.

On 24 August 2022, Sabian made his return on Dynamite and attacked AEW All-Atlantic Champion Pac during the main event. At All Out's Zero Hour pre-show on 4 September, Sabian fought Pac for the title in a losing effort. On the 7 December episode of Dynamite, Sabian competed in the Dynamite Dozen Battle Royale, being eliminated first by Dustin Rhodes. He began a feud with Orange Cassidy over the All-Atlantic Championship, sending Trent Seven in a failed attempt on 9 December episode of Rampage. On 6 January 2023 at Battle of the Belts V, Sabian failed to win the title from Cassidy. At Double or Nothing on 28 May, Sabian competed in the Blackjack Battle Royal for Cassidy's now renamed AEW International Championship, being eliminated by Chuck Taylor. At Worlds End's Zero Hour pre-show on 30 December, Sabian competed in a 20-man battle royale to become number one contender to the TNT Championship, being eliminated by Bryan Keith.

On 26 January 2024 episode of Rampage, Sabian competed in the Freshly Squeezed Four Way to determine the number one contender to Orange Cassidy's International Championship at tomorrow's Collision, losing to Komander who pinned him.

==== The Patriarchy / The Matriachy (2024–2026) ====
Sabian began a feud with The Patriarchy's Nick Wayne after being confronted by him at the Blood & Guts special on 24 July. On the following Rampage, Sabian competed in the Royal Rampage match to determine the number one contender to Swerve Strickland's AEW World Championship at Grand Slam, eliminating Wayne before being thrown out by both Jay Lethal and Jeff Jarrett. On 16 August episode of Rampage, he lost to Wayne after being attacked by Killswitch. At All In's Zero Hour pre-show on 25 August, Sabian was on the winning side of a 16-man tag team match. On 20 September episode of Rampage, he lost a four-way match to Wayne, which also involved Lio Rush and Rocky Romero. Five days later, at Dynamite: Grand Slam, Sabian prevented Christian Cage from signing his AEW World Championship match contract. On the 23 October episode of Dynamite, Sabian turned heel after preventing Hook from attacking Cage. Two weeks later, Sabian officially joined The Patriarchy.

After Christian and Wayne failed to win the AEW World Tag Team Championship from The Hurt Syndicate (Bobby Lashley and Shelton Benjamin) at All In: Texas on July 12, 2025, Wayne and Sabian turned on Christian and attacked him, thus kicking him out of The Patriarchy. On the July 16 episode of Dynamite, The Patriachy was renamed to "The Matriachy". On August 24 at Forbidden Door, Sabian and Killswitch were defeated by Adam Copeland and Christian Cage.

In July 2026, the Matriachy quietly disbanded as Sabian ceased appearing with Wayne who began performing as a singles wrestler.

== Other media ==
Kip Sabian

Twitch information
- Channel: thekipsabian
- Years active: 2020–present
- Genre: Gaming
- Followers: 20.4 thousand
- Last updated: 6 July 2025

Kippen is also a background character in the film Fighting With My Family, seen during multiple scenes at the WWE Performance Center.

== Personal life ==
In April 2020, Kippen got engaged to fellow professional wrestler Olivia Hasler better known by fans as Penelope Ford. On 23 December 2020 episode of AEW Dynamite: Holiday Bash, the couple announced that they would have a beach wedding on 3 February 2021 episode of AEW Dynamite: Beach Break. Kippen and Hasler married on 3 February 2021. In March 2023, Kippen and Hasler disclosed to the public that Hasler had suffered a miscarriage during a 2022 pregnancy.

On 20 December 2022, Kippen disclosed having ADHD, and also stated "Many years of finding coping mechanisms that work for my brain. I try to see it more as a super power with its hardships to be honest."

== Championships and accomplishments ==
- British Wrestling Revolution
  - BWR Cruiserweight Championship (1 time, inaugural)
  - BWR Cruiserweight Title Tournament (2018)
- DDT Pro-Wrestling
  - Ironman Heavymetalweight Championship (1 time)
- Dynamic Over-The-Top Action Wrestling
  - DOA UK Tag Team Championship (2 times) - with Brad Slayer (1) and Peter Nixon (1)
- European Catch Tour Association
  - ECTA Junior Heavyweight Championship (1 time)
  - ECTA Tag Team Championship (1 time) - with Brad Slayer
- House Of Pain: Evolution
  - HOPE Championship (1 time)
  - HOPE Kings Of Flight Championship (1 time)
  - Kings Of Flights Tournament (2017)
- International Pro Wrestling: UK
  - IPW:UK World Championship (1 time)
  - Z-Force Championship (2 times)
- Pro Wrestling Chaos
  - Knights Of Chaos Championship (1 time) - with Martin Kirby
- New Generation Wrestling
  - NGW Tag Team Championship (1 time) - with Iestyn Rees
- Plymouth Wrestling Association
  - PWA Tag Team Championship (1 time) - with Brad Slayer
- Pro Wrestling Chaos
  - Knights of Chaos Championship (1 time) - with Martin Kirby
- Pro Wrestling Illustrated
  - Ranked No. 162 of the top 500 singles wrestlers in the PWI 500 in 2020
- Reloaded Championship Wrestling Alliance
  - RCWA Elite-1 Championship (1 time)
- Southside Wrestling Entertainment
  - SWE Speed King Championship (1 time)
- World Association of Wrestling
  - WAW Open Light Heavyweight Championship (2 times)
  - WAW U23 Championship (1 time)
  - WAW World Tag Team Championship (3 times) - with Brad Slayer
- World Of Sport Wrestling
  - WOS Tag Team Championship (1 time) - with Iestyn Rees
