= AEW TNT Championship =

Men's professional wrestling championship

- Top: The standard TNT Championship belt (2021, 2023–present); Bottom: The "Bling Belt" used by reigning champion Darby Allin (2026–present), which was previously used as the standard belt from 2021–2023.

Details
- Promotion: All Elite Wrestling
- Date established: March 30, 2020
- Current champion: Darby Allin
- Date won: August 30, 2026
Statistics
- First champion: Cody Rhodes (Note: During his inaugural reign and through the majority of his second reign, his ring name was just Cody.)
- Most reigns: 3 reigns: Cody Rhodes; Sammy Guevara; Wardlow; Darby Allin
- Longest reign: Darby Allin (1st reign, 186 days)
- Shortest reign: Adam Copeland (1st reign, 3 minutes and 30 seconds)
- Oldest champion: Dustin Rhodes (56 years, 92 days)
- Youngest champion: Daniel Garcia (26 years, 67 days)
- Heaviest champion: Samoa Joe (310 lb (140 kg))
- Lightest champion: Jack Perry (167 lb (76 kg))

The AEW TNT Championship is a men's professional wrestling television championship created and promoted by the American promotion All Elite Wrestling (AEW). Established on March 30, 2020, it is named after the TNT television network, which airs AEW's weekly program Collision and other television specials. The inaugural champion was Cody Rhodes. The current champion is Darby Allin, who is in his record-tying third reign. He won the title by defeating previous champion Kevin Knight in a Falls Count Anywhere match at All In on August 30, 2026.

== History ==
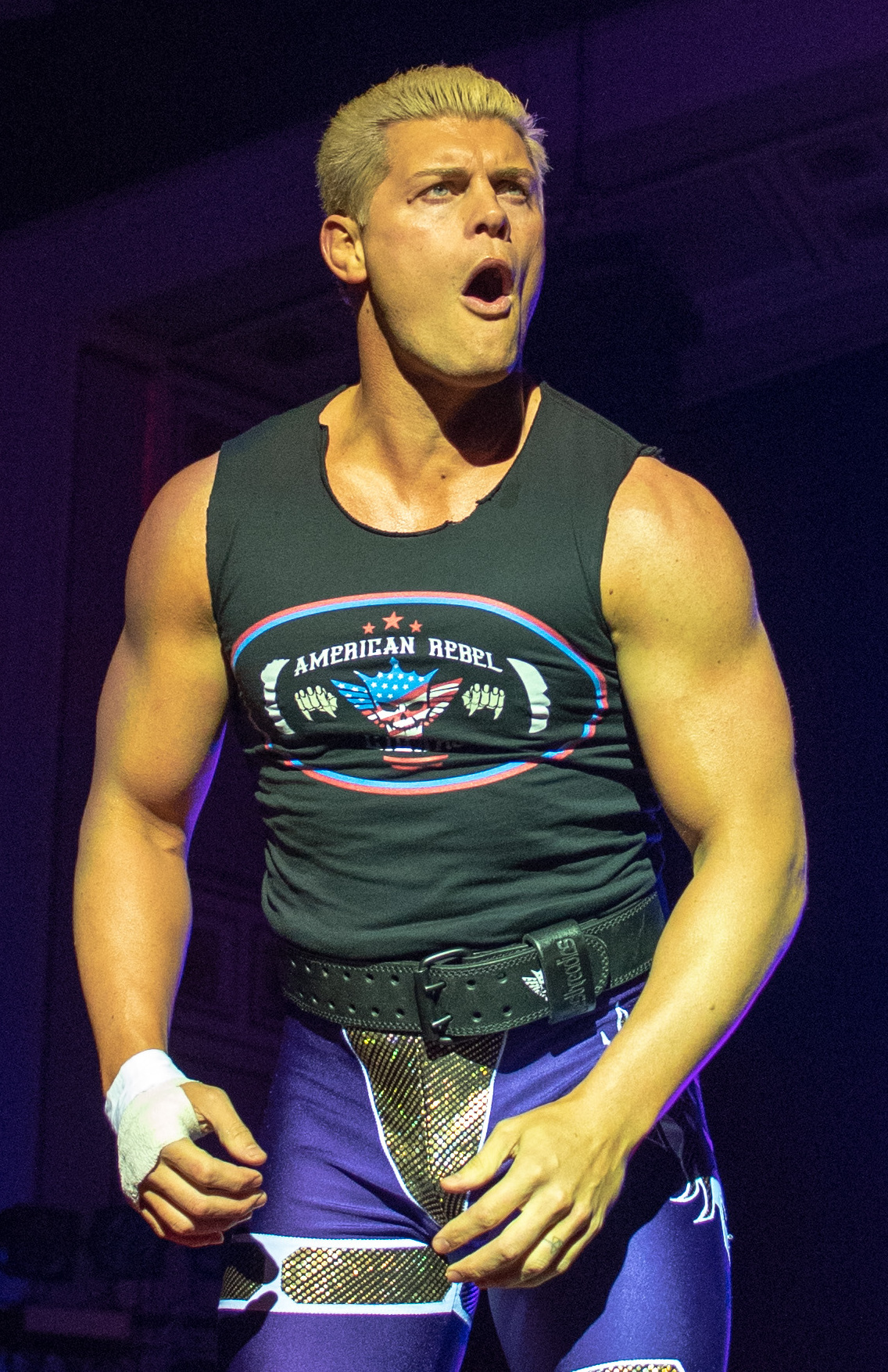
Inaugural and record-setting three-time champion Cody Rhodes; this record is currently tied between Rhodes, Sammy Guevara, Wardlow, and Darby Allin

In September 2019, a month before All Elite Wrestling (AEW) launched their first weekly television program, Dynamite, then-AEW Executive Vice President and wrestler Cody teased that the promotion would eventually debut a television championship, but their focus at that time was on their other recently established titles. In February 2020, wrestling journalist Dave Meltzer asked Cody about the possibility of the promotion adding a secondary championship. Although he did not confirm or deny it, Cody did not rule out the possibility of a secondary or "mid-card" title debuting that year. The following month, on March 30, on AEW's YouTube series Road to Dynamite, a secondary championship was officially announced. AEW play-by-play commentator and senior producer Tony Schiavone revealed that there would be an eight-man, single-elimination tournament to crown the first-ever AEW TNT Champion. The tournament began on the April 8 episode of Dynamite, and the final was scheduled for Double or Nothing on May 23. On the April 29 episode, Cody and Lance Archer won their semifinal matches, setting up the inaugural championship match.

At Double or Nothing, Cody defeated Archer to become the inaugural champion. Former professional boxer Mike Tyson presented the championship to Cody. His first reign with the title included an 'open challenge' where he would defend the title on a near-weekly televised basis, even to independent wrestlers outside the promotion. These performances notably led to the signings of Ricky Starks and Eddie Kingston. In November, during Cody's second reign as TNT Champion, his ring name was lengthened to Cody Rhodes following a legal battle with WWE over the trademark for the name.

During the Brodie Lee Celebration of Life, which aired as the December 30, 2020 episode of Dynamite, AEW announced that they had retired the red strap version of the title belt that had been used up to that point to honor Huber, whose ring name was Mr. Brodie Lee, the second TNT Champion. Lee unexpectedly died on December 26. His final match was on the October 7 episode of Dynamite where he unsuccessfully defended the TNT Championship against Cody Rhodes in a Dog Collar match. The retired TNT Championship belt was given to Huber's son, Brodie Lee Jr. (real name Brodie Huber), who was honored as "TNT Champion for life" by AEW President and Chief Executive Officer Tony Khan. AEW commentator Tony Schiavone clarified that only the belt design was retired, not the championship itself; a new black strap version of the belt was debuted by champion Darby Allin during Night 1 of the special New Year's Smash episode of Dynamite on January 6, 2021.

During the special Holiday Bash episode of Rampage on December 25, 2021, Cody Rhodes defeated Sammy Guevara to become a record three-time TNT Champion. The two were scheduled to have a rematch for the championship at Battle of the Belts I on January 8, 2022; however, Cody was pulled from the event as he had been in contact with family who had tested positive for COVID-19, thus requiring him to quarantine. Guevara instead faced Cody's brother, Dustin Rhodes, to determine an interim champion. Guevara defeated Dustin and served as the interim champion until the January 26 episode of Dynamite. In that episode, which was a special episode titled Beach Break, Guevara faced and defeated Cody in a ladder match to determine the undisputed TNT Champion.

On March 5, 2023, at Revolution, Wardlow defeated Samoa Joe to win the championship for a second time. Three days later, and initially not as part of a storyline, Wardlow's rental car was broken into; his gear and the championship belt were stolen as a result. This was turned into a storyline for his title defense against Powerhouse Hobbs on the March 8 episode of Dynamite, as the week prior, Hobbs had won the Face of the Revolution ladder match to earn a title shot against Wardlow. Q.T. Marshall and his QTV crew took credit for the crime with Wardlow requesting his title defense against Hobbs to be a Falls Count Anywhere match, which Hobbs won by technical knockout thanks to an assist by Marshall.

Although viewed as a secondary title to the AEW World Championship by fans and media of the professional wrestling industry, Tony Khan stated he takes exception to calling it a secondary or mid-card title. He said he does not book the championship as a mid-card title, saying, "I'm looking at it as a top championship that stars hold". Despite this, Samoa Joe called himself the "King of Television" for his TNT Championship reigns when he simultaneously held it with the ROH World Television Championship. Between 2022 and 2023, the championship had several title changes with short reigns, with journalists subsequently calling it a "hot potato" championship.

=== Name ===
The championship is named after the TNT television network, which originally aired AEW's then-two weekly programs, Dynamite and Rampage, the latter of which premiered in August 2021. TNT's parent company at the time, WarnerMedia, requested AEW to create the title and have it named the TNT Championship.

In January 2022, Dynamite moved to TNT's sister channel, TBS, which was also owned by WarnerMedia (later becoming Warner Bros. Discovery), while Rampage remained on TNT. In addition to Rampage remaining on the channel, AEW agreed to produce quarterly television specials on TNT (Battle of the Belts), with the championship defended on these specials. Another weekly program on TNT called Collision also premiered in June 2023. While it had been speculated that the title would be renamed to the TBS Championship, Cody Rhodes confirmed that it would not be renamed, and instead, a separate AEW TBS Championship was established for the women's division.

=== Inaugural tournament ===
The first half of the TNT Championship Tournament bracket was announced on the March 31, 2020, episode of Dark, with the second half revealed on the following night's Dynamite. The tournament began on the April 8 episode of Dynamite and concluded at Double or Nothing on May 23.

Quarterfinals; Dynamite (April 8, 15, 22, 2020)
Cody	Pin
Shawn Spears	21:38
Sammy Guevara	10:50
Darby Allin	Pin
Dustin Rhodes	Pin
Kip Sabian	14:10
Colt Cabana	12:42
Lance Archer	Pin

Semifinals; Dynamite (April 29, 2020)
Cody	Pin
Darby Allin	20:10
Dustin Rhodes	22:45
Lance Archer	Pin

Final; Double or Nothing (May 23, 2020)
Cody	Pin
Lance Archer	22:00

== Belt designs ==
The original red strap version of the TNT Championship belt; in honor of the late Mr. Brodie Lee (Jon Huber), the championship's second title holder, this red strap version of the title belt was retired on December 30, 2020, and given to Lee's son Brodie Lee Jr. (Brodie Huber), who was named honorary "TNT Champion for life"

The TNT Championship belt consists of six plates, which were originally on a red leather strap. The central plate prominently features the TNT network logo, with AEW's logo above and a red banner below saying "CHAMPION". The two inner side plates feature "Tara on Techwood", 1050 Techwood Drive in Atlanta, the original home of TNT. The two outer side plates feature AEW's logo, while a third smaller side plate on the far right also features the promotion's logo. Initially unveiled at Double or Nothing on May 23, the belt had no plating due to production delays caused by the COVID-19 pandemic. It was revealed that the final version would have gold plating and be unveiled at a later date. The belt was produced by AEW's then-primary belt maker, Ron Edwardsen of Red Leather. He mentioned that the final version of the TNT Championship would have both gold and nickel plating, as well as a relief TNT logo. The completed version of the belt was shown on AEW's Twitter just a few hours before the August 12 episode of Dynamite, where the finished design debuted for Cody's match against Scorpio Sky, where Cody retained.

After the unexpected passing of Mr. Brodie Lee, the championship's second title holder, in December 2020, AEW retired the red strap version of the championship belt that had been used up to that point to honor Lee, similar to how sports teams retire a number. During night one of the special New Year's Smash episode of Dynamite on January 6, 2021, a new belt was unveiled by Darby Allin. The new belt features the same design as the previous one, but on a black leather strap instead of red.

After Sammy Guevara defeated Miro to win the title on the September 29, 2021, episode of Dynamite, Guevara was presented with an updated design of the standard championship belt to replace Miro's custom belt. This new belt returned to the design of the standard black strap version introduced by Darby Allin, but with rhinestones added in the circular area behind the relief TNT logo. The original designer of the TNT Championship, Ron Edwardsen, also created the updated belt, which featured 1,577 rhinestones. Edwardsen nicknamed it the "TNT Bling" belt. Although initially a custom version for Guevara, other champions held this version until January 2023. After Allin defeated Samoa Joe to win his second TNT Championship, the title's design changed back to the mirror-finish nickel plating behind the TNT logo. After Kevin Knight won the title at Dynasty on April 12, 2026, he reintroduced the "Bling" belt on April 15.

=== Custom designs ===
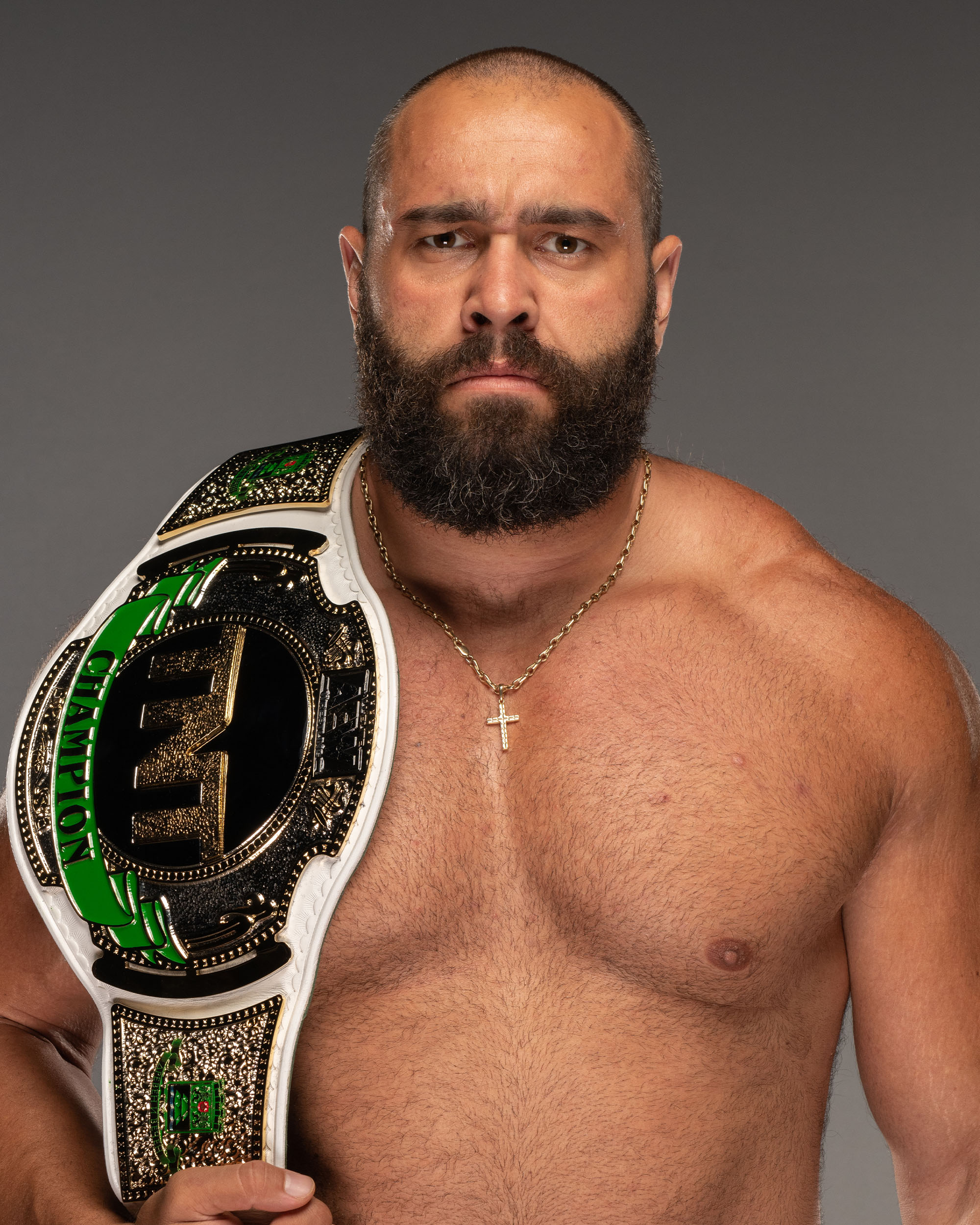
Miro with his custom "Bulgarian belt" that he used from July to September 2021

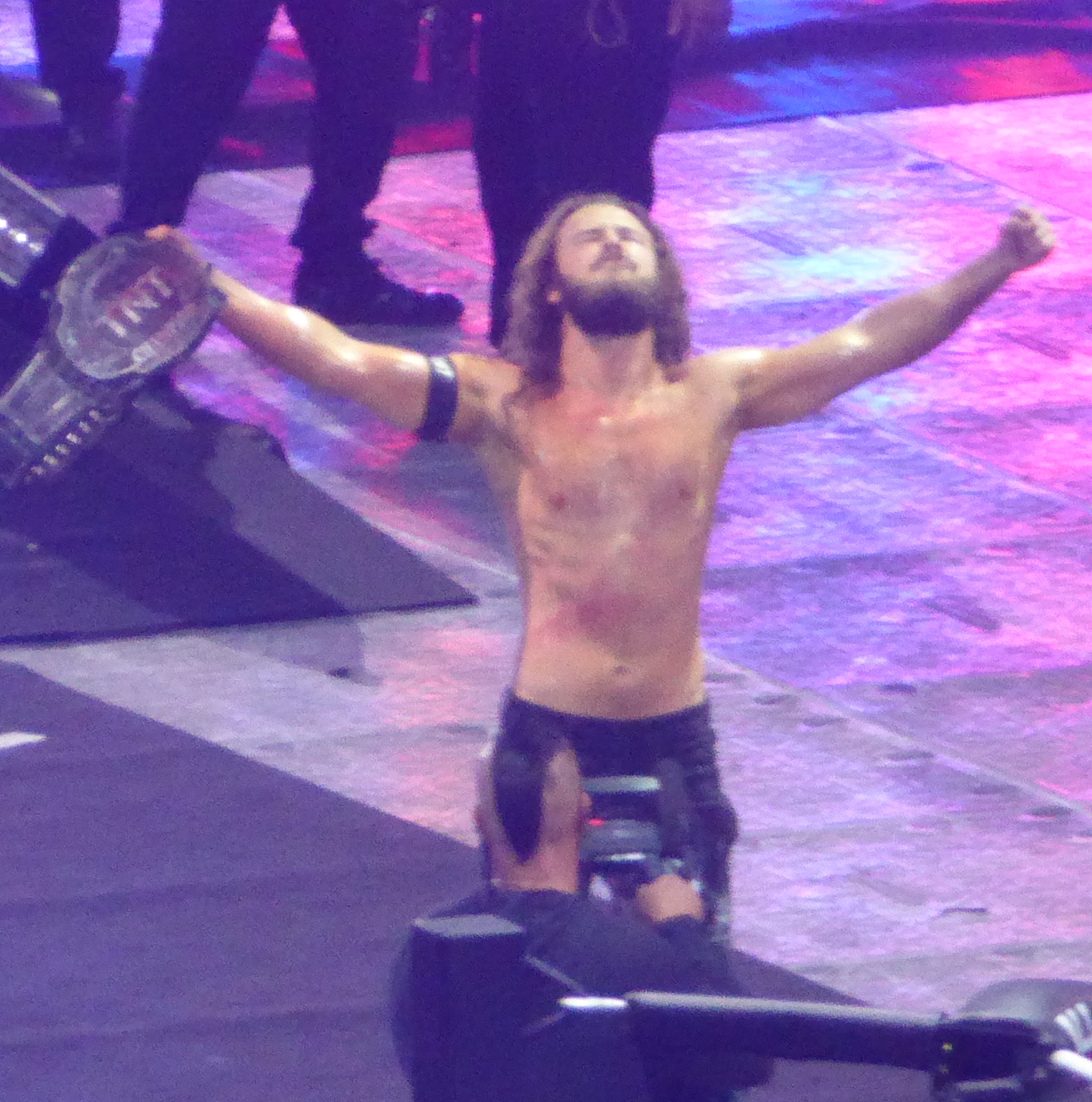
Jack Perry with his custom "Scapegoat belt", which he used from August to November 2024

Mark Briscoe's custom "snow camo" TNT Championship belt, used from November 2025 to January 2026

Kyle Fletcher's custom "pink" TNT Championship belt, used from February to April 2026

At Fyter Fest on July 14, 2021, Miro unveiled a custom championship belt in the colors of the Bulgarian flag, along with his new persona, "The Redeemer". The plates were on a white leather strap, and the center plate was the same; however, the red banner was changed to green. The two inner side plates were modified to display the coat of arms of his hometown, Plovdiv, Bulgaria. Below the arms, the city's motto "Древен и Вечен" (Bulgarian: Dreven i Vechen), which means "Ancient and Eternal", was added. Miro's custom belt was made by Belts By Dan.

During the May 20, 2022, episode of Rampage, Sammy Guevara, Tay Conti, and Frankie Kazarian destroyed the standard belt they stole from reigning champion Scorpio Sky. The following week, on the May 27 episode, Dan Lambert and Ethan Page presented Sky with a custom version of the championship belt in the colors of Sky's hometown and favorite National Basketball Association team, the Los Angeles Lakers. The "Lakers belt" had a gold strap and the word "Champion" on a purple banner. Emblazoned on the end of the strap between the snap buttons was "8-24", referring to the numbers worn by late Lakers star Kobe Bryant. The title's original designer, Ron Edwardsen, also designed the "Lakers belt".

Following reigning champion Jack Perry's match on the August 17, 2024, episode of Collision in the build to his defense against Darby Allin in a Coffin match at All In on August 25, Perry put his opponent Danny Orion in a body bag with Allin's name on it, along with the standard TNT Championship belt, which he spat on. Perry then unveiled his custom championship belt to accompany his "Scapegoat" persona, featuring the same design but completely spray-painted black with red paint splattered on the main plate (mimicking blood) and a warped and tattered leather strap. Perry himself changed the championship via blacksmithing, altering the metal, warping the leather strap, and then painting it.

After winning the title at Full Gear on November 22, 2025, Mark Briscoe was presented a custom belt by Orange Cassidy on behalf of their Conglomeration stable, which featured the same design as the standard belt, but with a snow camo strap, as snow camo ring gear is a trademark of both Mark and his late brother Jay. The red banner was also changed to white. This belt was made by Belts By Dan.

Following his successful defense in his home country of Australia at Grand Slam Australia on February 14, 2026, Kyle Fletcher unveiled his own custom TNT Championship belt, which retained the standard design but with a pink strap, as that is the signature color of Fletcher's ring gear. The belt was made by Belts By Dan.

== Reigns ==
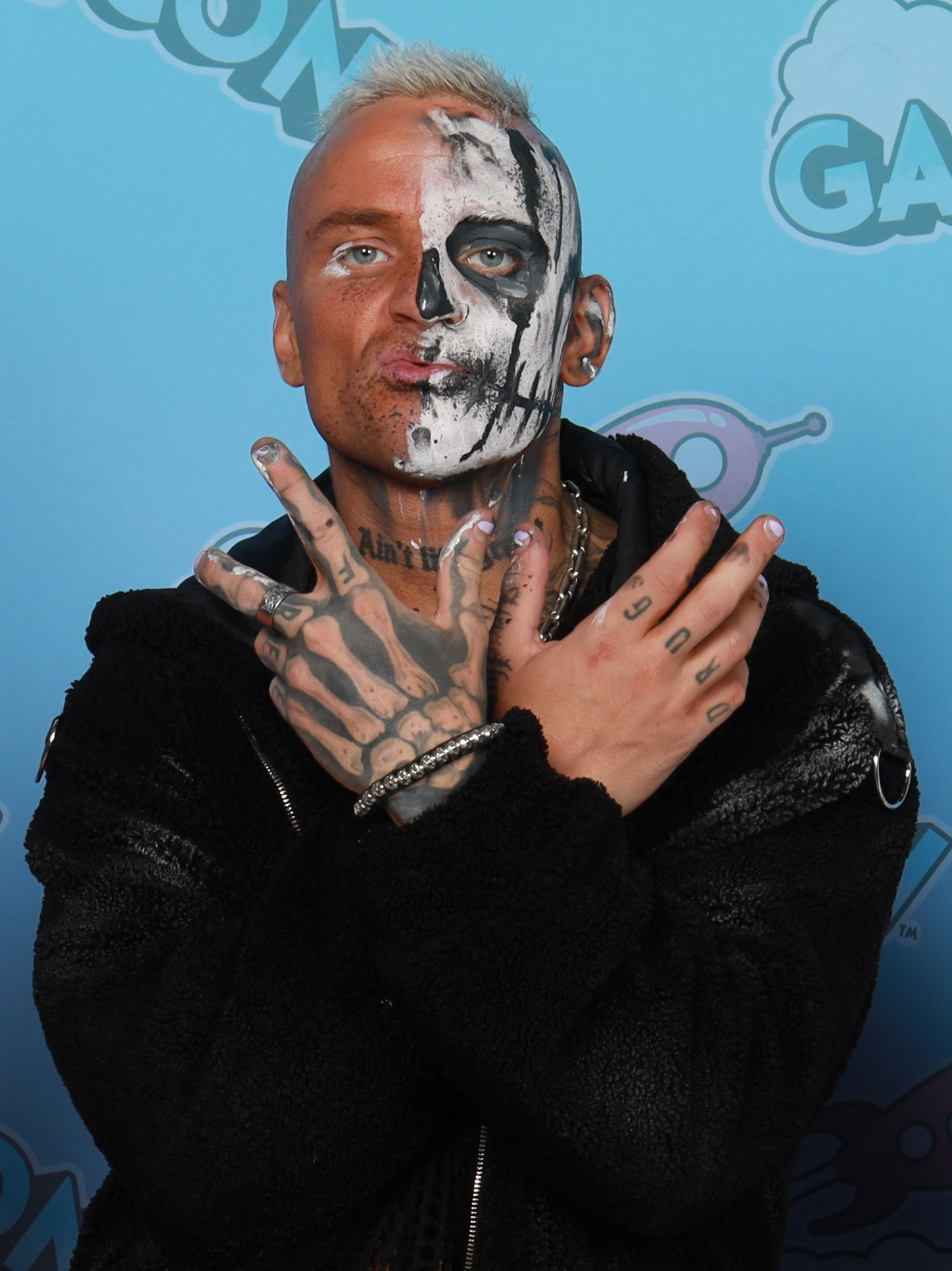
Current and record-tying three-time champion Darby Allin, who also has the longest combined reign at 295+ days

As of November 20, 2026, there have been 33 reigns between 20 champions and three vacancies. Cody Rhodes, then known simply as Cody, was the inaugural champion. Rhodes, Sammy Guevara, Wardlow, and Darby Allin are tied for the most reigns at three. Allin's first reign is the longest at 186 days, and he has the longest combined reign at 295+ days across his three reigns, while Adam Copeland's first reign is the shortest at 3 minutes and 30 seconds. Daniel Garcia is the youngest champion at 26 years, 67 days old, while Dustin Rhodes is the oldest, winning the title at 56.

Darby Allin is the current champion in his record-tying third reign. He defeated Kevin Knight in a Falls Count Anywhere match at All In on August 30, 2026.
