= List of All Elite Wrestling tournaments =

This is a list of All Elite Wrestling professional wrestling tournaments competed for by professional wrestlers that are part of their roster.

== Regular tournaments ==
=== Dynamite Diamond Ring ===
Since 2019, AEW has held a mini-tournament held late in the year to determine that year's recipient of the Dynamite Diamond Ring. The first round consists of the Dynamite Dozen Battle Royale, a twelve-man battle royal in which twelve wrestlers compete for the right to challenge for the ring. Between 2019 and 2021, the battle royale had two co-winners, who qualified for a final singles match to determine the ring's winner; from 2022 to 2024, the ring holder received a bye to the final. In 2024, the battle royale returned to a two-winner format, with the co-winners then facing each other for the right to challenge for the ring. MJF is a six-time winner of the ring, and the only wrestler to hold it until 2025. The current winner is Bandido, who beat Ricochet on December 24, 2025's Dynamite on 34th Street.

| Year | Winner | Runner-up | Finals match | |
| Year | Winner | Runner-up | Date and event | Location |
|---|---|---|---|---|
| 2019 | MJF | "Hangman" Adam Page | November 27, 2019; Thanksgiving Eve Dynamite | Hoffman Estates, Illinois |
| 2020 | MJF | Orange Cassidy | December 9, 2020; Dynamite | Jacksonville, Florida |
| 2021 | MJF | Dante Martin | December 15, 2021; Dynamite: Winter is Coming | Garland, Texas |
| 2022 (Note: This was a Winner Takes All match for both MJF's AEW World Championship and Dynamite Diamond Ring.) | MJF | Ricky Starks | December 14, 2022; Dynamite: Winter is Coming | Garland, Texas |
| 2023 | MJF | Juice Robinson | October 25, 2023; Dynamite | Philadelphia, Pennsylvania |
| 2024 | MJF | Adam Cole (Note: Kyle O'Reilly was the co-winner of the 2024 Dynamite Dozen Battle Royal.) | December 28, 2024; Worlds End | Orlando, Florida |
| 2025 | Bandido | Ricochet | December 20, 2025 (aired December 24); Dynamite on 34th Street | New York City, New York |

=== Owen Hart Cup ===
The Owen Hart Foundation Tournament, also known as the Owen Hart Cup, or simply, the Owen, is AEW's first regular major tournament. Held annually in the mid-year in collaboration with the Owen Hart Foundation, it consists of two eight-wrestler single-elimination tournaments – one for each gender – with the winner receiving a commemorative championship belt and, beginning in 2024, a world championship match at All In, AEW's biggest show of the year.

| Year | Winners | Final | | | Losing finalist | World title match | Notes |
| Year | Winners | Event | Date | Venue | Losing finalist | World title match | Notes |
|---|---|---|---|---|---|---|---|
| 2022 | Dr. Britt Baker, D.M.D. | Double or Nothing | May 29, 2022 | T-Mobile Arena; Paradise, Nevada | Ruby Soho | None | (Note: 15-woman tournament; Maki Itoh received a bye to the quarter-finals.) |
| 2022 | Adam Cole | Double or Nothing | May 29, 2022 | T-Mobile Arena; Paradise, Nevada | Samoa Joe | None | (Note: 15-man tournament; Johnny Elite received a bye to the quarter-finals.) |
| 2023 | Willow Nightingale | Collision | July 15, 2023 | Scotiabank Saddledome; Calgary, Alberta | Ruby Soho | None (Note: As a result of defeating ROH Women's World Champion Athena in the semi-finals, Nightingale was given a title shot at Death Before Dishonor; she was unsuccessful.) | —N/a |
| 2023 | Ricky Starks | Collision | July 15, 2023 | Scotiabank Saddledome; Calgary, Alberta | CM Punk | None (Note: Due to Starks' cheating in the tournament final, Punk demanded a rematch on the August 5, 2023, Collision with Punk's "Real World Championship" on the line; Starks was unsuccessful.) | —N/a |
| 2024 | Mariah May | Dynamite | July 10, 2024 | Scotiabank Saddledome; Calgary, Alberta | Willow Nightingale | Defeated "Timeless" Toni Storm at All In: London | —N/a |
| 2024 | Bryan Danielson | Dynamite | July 10, 2024 | Scotiabank Saddledome; Calgary, Alberta | "Hangman" Adam Page | Defeated Swerve Strickland in a Title vs. Career match at All In: London | —N/a |
| 2025 | Mercedes Moné | Double or Nothing | May 25, 2025 | Desert Diamond Arena; Glendale, Arizona | Jamie Hayter | Was defeated by "Timeless" Toni Storm at All In: Texas | —N/a |
| 2025 | "Hangman" Adam Page | Double or Nothing | May 25, 2025 | Desert Diamond Arena; Glendale, Arizona | Will Ospreay | Defeated Jon Moxley in a Texas Deathmatch at All In: Texas | —N/a |
| 2026 | Mercedes Moné | Forbidden Door | June 28, 2026 | SAP Center; San Jose, California | Maya World | Defeated Willow Nightingale at All In: London | —N/a |
| 2026 | Will Ospreay | Forbidden Door | June 28, 2026 | SAP Center; San Jose, California | Swerve Strickland | Defeated Kenny Omega at All In London | —N/a |

=== Continental Classic ===
The Continental Classic (C2) is AEW's second major regular tournament. Held annually at the end of the year, it is a round-robin tournament not unlike New Japan Pro-Wrestling's G1 Climax; two blocks of six wrestlers (twelve in total) wrestle each other to qualify for a short play-off tournament which culminates at the final pay-per-view of the year, Worlds End. The prize for winning the tournament is the AEW Continental Championship.

Tournament results
| Year | Winner | | Runner up | | Other participants | |
|---|---|---|---|---|---|---|
| 2023 | B | Eddie Kingston (9) | G | Jon Moxley (12) | Blue | Bryan Danielson (10), Andrade El Idolo (9), Claudio Castagnoli (7), Brody King (6), Daniel Garcia (3) |
| 2023 | B | Eddie Kingston (9) | G | Jon Moxley (12) | Gold | Swerve Strickland (12), Jay White (12), Rush (6), Mark Briscoe (3), Jay Lethal (0) |
| 2024 | B | Kazuchika Okada (c; 10) | G | Will Ospreay (9) | Blue | Kyle Fletcher (12), Mark Briscoe (9), Daniel Garcia (7), Shelton Benjamin (6), The Beast Mortos (0) |
| 2024 | B | Kazuchika Okada (c; 10) | G | Will Ospreay (9) | Gold | Ricochet (10), Claudio Castagnoli (9), Darby Allin (7), Brody King (6), Komander (3), ~~Juice Robinson~~ |
| 2025 | B | Jon Moxley (9) | G | Kazuchika Okada (c; 9) | Blue | Konosuke Takeshita (13), Claudio Castagnoli (7), Orange Cassidy (6), Máscara Dorada (6), Roderick Strong (3) |
| 2025 | B | Jon Moxley (9) | G | Kazuchika Okada (c; 9) | Gold | Kyle Fletcher (9), Kevin Knight (7), Pac (7), "Jungle" Jack Perry (6), "Speedball" Mike Bailey (6), ~~Darby Allin~~ |
(c) – the Continental Champion at the beginning of the tournament Numbers in brackets indicate how many points were won by each participant Italics indicate losing league finalists ~~Struckthrough text~~ indicates participants replaced due to injury

== Sporadic tournaments ==
| Tournament | Prize | Dates | Final | Winner | Notes |
|---|---|---|---|---|---|
| World Tag Team Championship Tournament | The inaugural World Tag Team Championship | October 9–30, 2019 | Dynamite: Halloween Eve | SoCal Uncensored (Frankie Kazarian and Scorpio Sky) | The Dark Order received a bye to the semi-finals. |
| World Championship #1 Contender Tournament | A World Championship match | January 15–22, 2020 | Bash at the Beach: Night 2 | Jon Moxley | Defeated Chris Jericho at Revolution. |
| TNT Championship Tournament | The inaugural TNT Championship | April 8 – May 23, 2020 | Double or Nothing | Cody | |
| Women's Tag Team Cup Tournament: The Deadly Draw | None | August 3–22, 2020 | Saturday Night Dynamite | Diamante and Ivelisse | |
| World Championship Eliminator Tournament | A World Championship match | October 21 – November 7, 2020 | Full Gear | Kenny Omega | Defeated Jon Moxley at Winter is Coming. |
| Women's World Championship Eliminator Tournament | A World Championship match | February 10 – March 3, 2021 | Dynamite: The Crossroads | Ryo Mizunami | Lost to Hikaru Shida at Revolution. |
| World Tag Team Championship Eliminator Tournament | A World Tag Team Championship match | August 20–27, 2021 | Rampage | Lucha Brothers (Penta El Zero Miedo and Rey Fénix) | Defeated The Young Bucks at All Out. |
| World Championship Eliminator Tournament | A World Championship match | October 22 – November 13, 2021 | Full Gear | Bryan Danielson | Took "Hangman" Adam Page to a time limit draw at Winter is Coming; lost a rematch on the January 8, 2022 Dynamite. |
| TBS Championship Tournament | The inaugural TBS Championship | October 23, 2021 – January 5, 2022 | Dynamite | Jade Cargill | Thunder Rosa, Jade Cargill, Nyla Rose and Ruby Soho received byes to the quarter-finals. |
| Interim World Championship Eliminator Series | The interim World Championship | June 8–26, 2022 | Forbidden Door | Jon Moxley | New Japan Pro-Wrestling held a qualifying match at Dominion to determine their representative for the match, Hiroshi Tanahashi. Moxley won the World Championship from lineal champion CM Punk on the August 24 Dynamite. |
| All-Atlantic Championship Tournament | The inaugural All-Atlantic Championship | June 8–26, 2022 | Forbidden Door | Pac | New Japan Pro-Wrestling held a preliminary qualifying tournament to determine its two representatives to the into the tournament, Clark Connors and Tomohiro Ishii. |
| World Trios Championship Tournament | The inaugural World Trios Championship | August 17 – September 4, 2022 | All Out | The Elite (Kenny Omega, Matt Jackson, and Nick Jackson) | |
| Grand Slam Tournament of Champions | The vacant World Championship | September 7–21, 2022 | Grand Slam | Jon Moxley | Moxley and Chris Jericho received byes into the semi-final. |
| World Championship Eliminator Tournament | A World Championship match | November 9–23, 2022 | Dynamite | Ricky Starks | Lost to MJF at Winter Is Coming. |
| Four Pillars Tournament | A World Championship match | April 19–26, 2023 | Dynamite | Sammy Guevara | Darby Allin received a bye into the final. Allin and "Jungle Boy" Jack Perry defeated MJF and Guevara on the May 3 Dynamite to turn the match at Double or Nothing into a four-way match, which MJF won. |
| Blind Eliminator Tag Team Tournament | A World Tag Team Championship match | July 5–19, 2023 | Blood and Guts | Better Than You Bay Bay (Adam Cole and MJF) | Lost to FTR on the July 29 Collision. |
| Women's World Championship Tournament | Women’s World Championship | August 9–27, 2023 | All In | Saraya | Hikaru Shida defended her championship throughout the tournament. Toni Storm used her rematch clause to receive a bye into the final. |
| Grand Slam World Championship Eliminator Tournament | A World Championship match | September 6–13, 2023 | Dynamite | Samoa Joe | Lost to MJF at Grand Slam. |
| World Tag Team Championship Tournament | The vacant World Tag Team Championship | March 16 – April 21, 2024 | Dynasty | The Young Bucks (Matt and Nick Jackson) | Best Friends, Don Callis Family, The Infantry, and House of Black were designated as wildcards. |
| FTW Contenders Series | A FTW Championship match | May 18–22, 2024 | Dynamite | Hook and Katsuyori Shibata | Hook and Shibata simultaneously submitted Bryan Keith in the final of the tournament. Both men lost to Chris Jericho at Double or Nothing. |
| World Tag Team Championship Full Gear 4-Way Contender Series | World Tag Team Championship | November 9–23, 2024 | Full Gear | Private Party | Private Party, who received a bye to the final, successfully defended their championship at Full Gear. |
| International Women’s Cup | A women’s championship match | November 27, 2024 – January 5, 2025 | Wrestle Dynasty | Momo Watanabe | Cross-promoted tournament with Consejo Mundial de Lucha Libre, Ring of Honor, and World Wonder Ring Stardom. Watanabe unsuccessfully challenged Mercedes Moné for the AEW TBS Championship at Revolution. |
| International Championship Eliminator Tournament | An International Championship match | March 12–19, 2025 | Dynamite | "Speedball" Mike Bailey and Ricochet | Ricochet successfully pinned Bailey as Bailey successfully pinned Mark Davis, resulting in both men qualifying. Kenny Omega successfully defended the International Championship at Dynasty. |
| International Championship Tournament | International Championship | May 28 – June 4, 2025 | Fyter Fest | Kenny Omega | Omega, who received a bye to the final, successfully defended his championship at Fyter Fest. |
| Unified Championship Tournament | Unified Championship | September 11–20, 2025 | All Out | Kazuchika Okada | Okada successfully defended his championship throughout the tournament. |
| Women's World Tag Team Championship Tournament | The inaugural Women's World Tag Team Championship | October 29 – December 10, 2025 | Winter Is Coming | The Babes of Wrath (Harley Cameron and Willow Nightingale) | |
| Continental Challenge Cup | Continental Championship | August 8–30, 2026 | All In | Jon Moxley | Tournament matches were scheduled, in storyline, by blind draw. Moxley successfully defended his championship throughout the tournament. |
