= Forbidden Door (2022) =

All Elite Wrestling and New Japan Pro-Wrestling pay-per-view event

AEW x NJPW: Forbidden Door
- Promotional poster featuring Jon Moxley and Hiroshi Tanahashi
- Promotion(s): All Elite Wrestling; New Japan Pro-Wrestling
- Date: June 26, 2022
- City: Chicago, Illinois
- Venue: United Center
- Attendance: 16,529
- Buy rate: 140,000

Pay-per-view chronology
← Previous; AEW: Double or Nothing; NJPW: Dominion 6.12 in Osaka-jo Hall	Next → AEW: All Out; NJPW: G1 Climax 32; Music City Mayhem

Forbidden Door chronology
← Previous; First	Next → 2023

The 2022 Forbidden Door was a professional wrestling pay-per-view (PPV) event and supershow co-produced by the American promotion All Elite Wrestling (AEW) and the Japan-based New Japan Pro-Wrestling (NJPW). It was the inaugural Forbidden Door and took place on June 26, 2022, at the United Center in Chicago, Illinois, and was the first AEW/NJPW co-promoted event. It was the first professional wrestling pay-per-view held at this venue since Spring Stampede in 2000, which was produced by World Championship Wrestling (WCW).

Thirteen matches were contested at the event, including four on The Buy In pre-show. In the main event, Jon Moxley defeated Hiroshi Tanahashi to become the interim AEW World Champion. In other prominent matches, Jay White defeated "Hangman" Adam Page, Kazuchika Okada, and Adam Cole in a four-way match to retain the IWGP World Heavyweight Championship, Pac defeated Clark Connors, Miro, and Malakai Black in a four-way match to become the inaugural AEW All-Atlantic Champion, and Claudio Castagnoli, formerly known as Cesaro in WWE, defeated Zack Sabre Jr. in his AEW debut match. The event also saw special appearances by Juice Robinson and Katsuyori Shibata.

== Production ==
=== Background ===
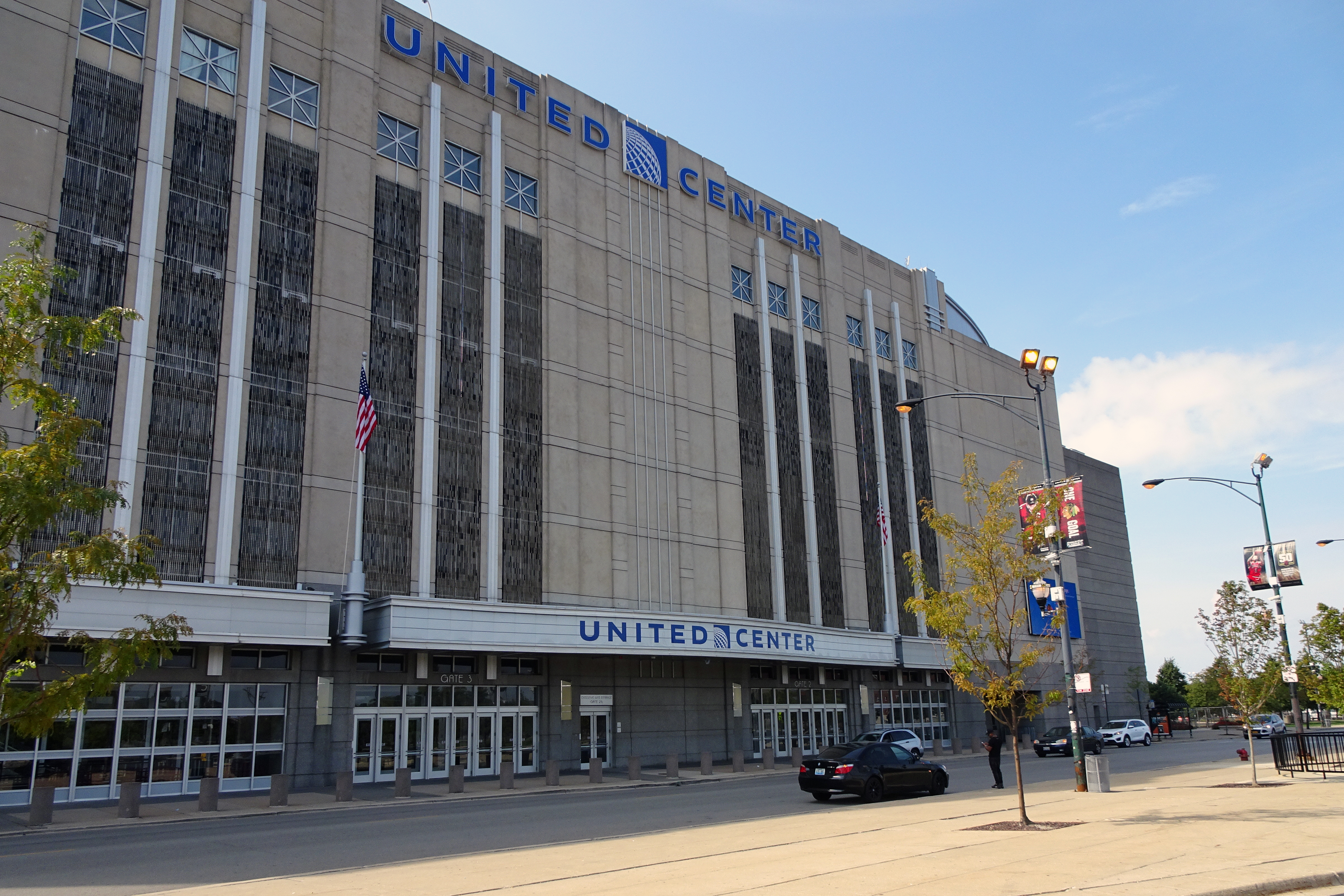
The inaugural Forbidden Door was held at the United Center in Chicago, Illinois, which was the first professional wrestling pay-per-view event held at the venue in 22 years.

In February 2021, the American professional wrestling promotion All Elite Wrestling (AEW) started a partnership with the Japanese promotion, New Japan Pro-Wrestling (NJPW), with Kenta being the first NJPW wrestler to appear on AEW's primary weekly television program, Wednesday Night Dynamite during the Beach Break special. Since then, both AEW and NJPW have had their wrestlers appear on each other's shows in the United States. On April 15, 2022, it was reported that a planned co-promoted event held by the two promotions was in the works.

On the April 20 episode of Dynamite, AEW President Tony Khan introduced NJPW President Takami Ohbari to make a major announcement regarding their respective companies. They were interrupted by AEW wrestler Adam Cole, who officially announced that a co-promoted event titled Forbidden Door would be held on June 26 at the United Center in Chicago, Illinois. The event took its name from the same term often used by AEW when referring to working with other professional wrestling promotions. The event aired on pay-per-view (PPV) via traditional PPV outlets, the Bleacher Report app, FITE TV, and was livestreamed in Japan on NJPW World. Pre-sale tickets went on sale on May 5 and sold out in less than 40 minutes, with more than 11,000 tickets sold with only a limited number of tickets set aside to go on sale to the general public on May 6. Forbidden Door became the first professional wrestling pay-per-view event to be held at the United Center since the former World Championship Wrestling (WCW)'s Spring Stampede took place in 2000.

=== Storylines ===
Forbidden Door featured professional wrestling matches that involved different wrestlers from pre-existing scripted feuds and storylines.

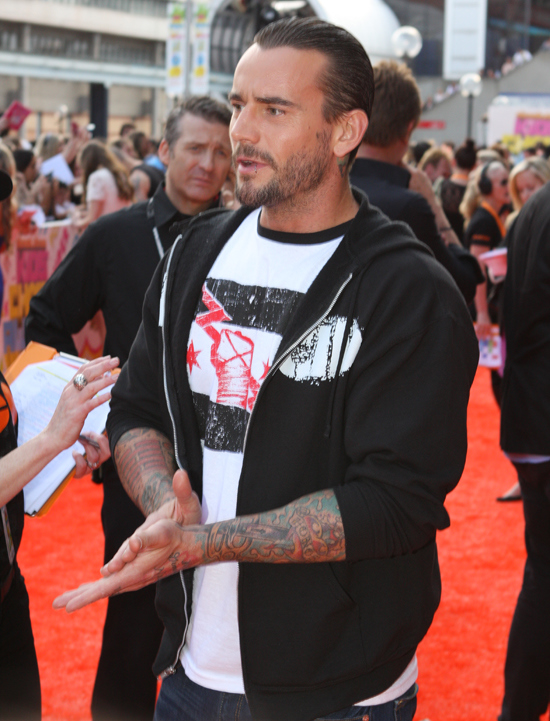
CM Punk was originally scheduled to defend the AEW World Championship against Hiroshi Tanahashi at the event, but was removed from the card due to an injury.

On the June 1 episode of Dynamite, newly crowned AEW World Champion CM Punk called out his NJPW Forbidden Door opponent. Hiroshi Tanahashi would make a surprise debut, indicating he would face Punk for the title at the supershow. On the June 3 episode of Friday Night Rampage, however, Punk announced that he needed surgery and would be taking time off. Instead of vacating the title, AEW president Tony Khan announced that they would crown an interim champion at Forbidden Door. A battle royal was scheduled to open the June 8 episode of Dynamite, with the winner facing Jon Moxley, who was the number one ranked singles competitor, in the show's main event, and the winner of that match would be placed in the match to crown the interim AEW World Champion at Forbidden Door. It was then announced on AEW's social media that the winner of Hiroshi Tanahashi vs. Hirooki Goto at NJPW's Dominion 6.12 in Osaka-jo Hall would be the other competitor in the interim championship match at Forbidden Door. On the June 8 episode of Dynamite, Kyle O'Reilly won the Casino Battle Royale, but was defeated by Moxley in the main event, who advanced to Forbidden Door. At Dominion, Tanahashi defeated Goto, setting up NJPW's half of the match.

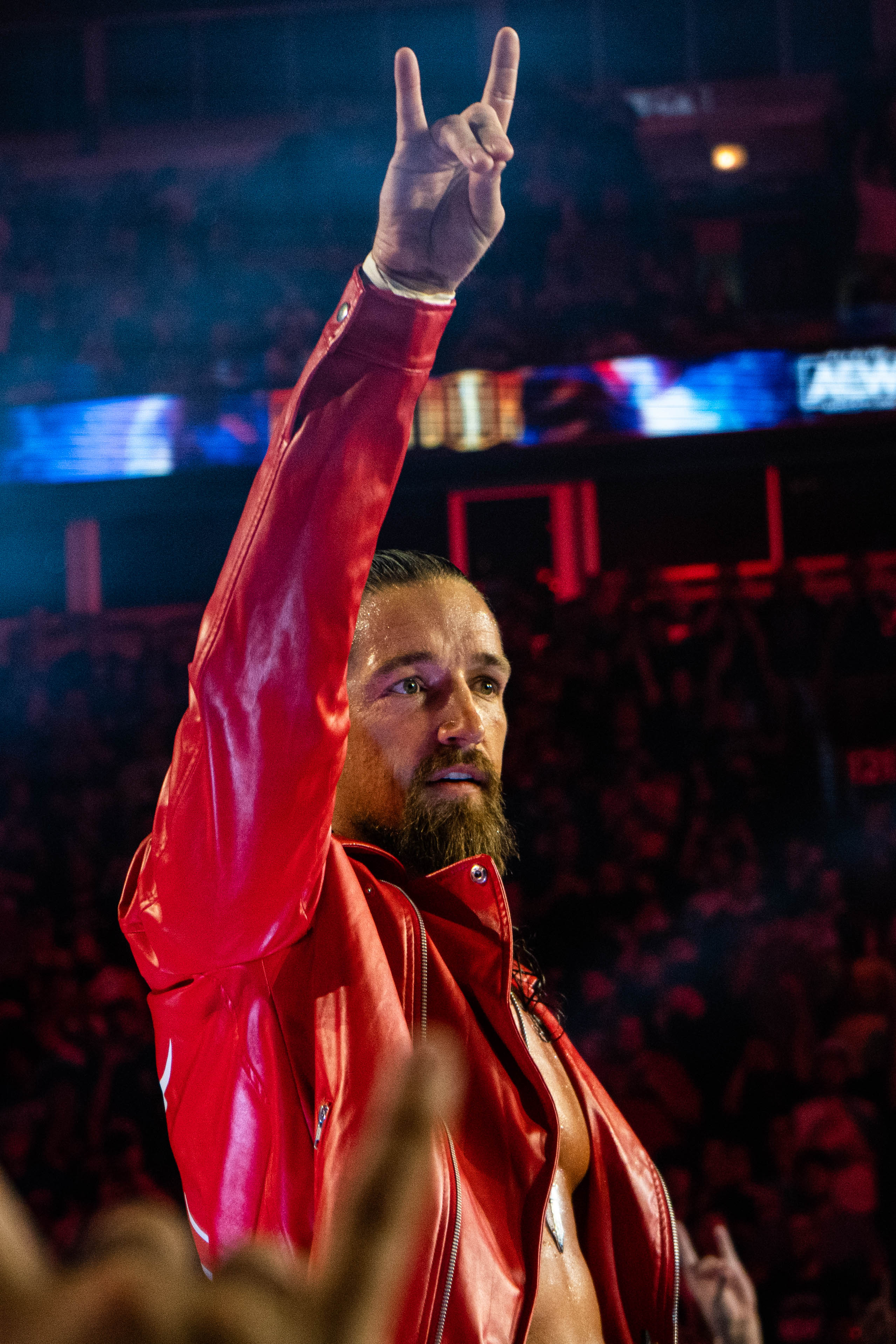
Jay White defended the IWGP World Heavyweight Championship against Kazuchika Okada, "Hangman" Adam Page, and Adam Cole in a four-way match.

On the June 8 episode of Dynamite, "Hangman" Adam Page wrestled his first match since losing the AEW World Championship to CM Punk at Double or Nothing, defeating David Finlay. After the match, Page called out Kazuchika Okada, the reigning IWGP World Heavyweight Champion, challenging him to a match for the title at Forbidden Door. Page was interrupted by Adam Cole, who pointed out that Okada may not be champion by Forbidden Door due to his scheduled title defense against Jay White at Dominion 6.12 in Osaka-jo Hall. On June 12, White defeated Okada to win the title and insulted Page after the match. Page addressed the situation on the June 15 episode of Dynamite, and was once again interrupted by Cole, who also wanted to face White for the title. White appeared from behind Page and attacked him with a Blade Runner. White went on to explain that he would not defend his title against Page, pointing out that he was 2–0 against Page, much to Cole's amusement. At the same time, much to Cole's dismay, White also stated he would not defend the title against Cole either, leaving White's Forbidden Door opponent still to be decided. On the June 22 episode, Cole and White once again attacked Page, however, Okada made his AEW debut, helping Page fend off Cole and White. It was later announced that White would defend the title in a four-way match against Okada, Page, and Cole at Forbidden Door.

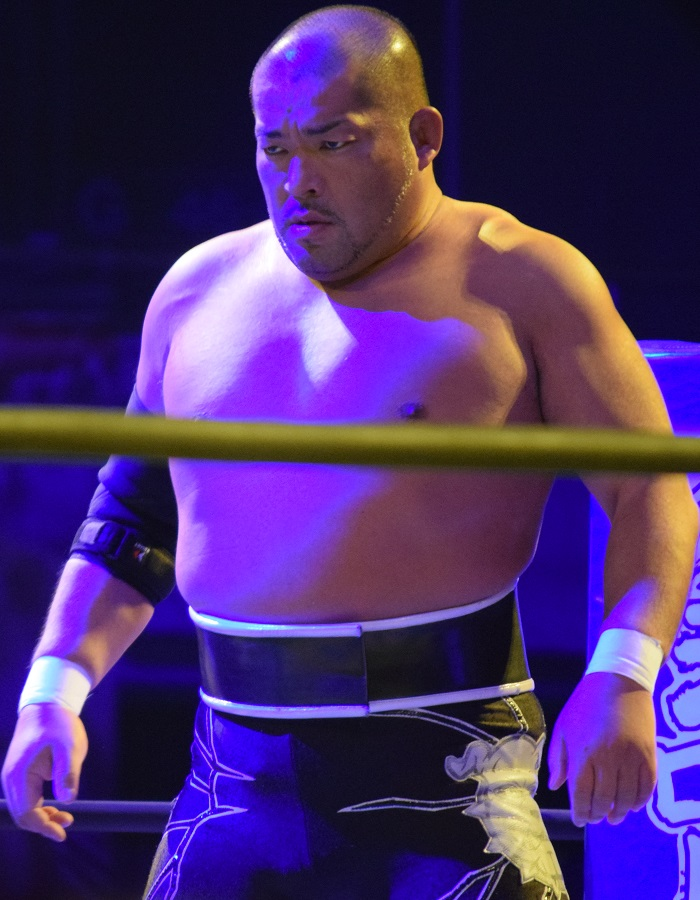
Tomohiro Ishii qualified for the inaugural AEW All-Atlantic Championship match, but he did not appear at the event because he was not medically cleared to compete.

Also on the June 8 episode of Dynamite, AEW unveiled a brand new men's singles championship, the AEW All-Atlantic Championship, to be a secondary championship of the promotion to "represent the AEW fans watching around the world in over 130 countries". It was announced that four wrestlers, determined through qualifying matches, would battle in a fatal four-way match at Forbidden Door to be crowned the inaugural champion. Pac defeated Buddy Matthews that same night to qualify. On the June 15 episode, Miro defeated Ethan Page to become the second qualifier, and Tomohiro Ishii defeated Clark Connors on June 21 at New Japan Road to qualify. Malakai Black was the last qualifier, defeating Penta Oscuro on the June 22 episode of Dynamite. On June 23, Ishii was replaced by Connors following an injury.

On the May 25, episode of Dynamite, the United Empire's (UE) Great-O-Khan and Jeff Cobb interrupted a match for the ROH World Tag Team Championship between FTR (Cash Wheeler and Dax Harwood) and Roppongi Vice (Trent Baretta and Rocky Romero), attacking both teams. The following week, faction leader Will Ospreay made his surprise debut where, along with other UE stablemates Aaron Henare and Kyle Fletcher and Mark Davis of Aussie Open, they attacked Beretta and FTR. On the June 10, episode of Rampage, Beretta and FTR picked up a victory against Ospreay, Davis, and Fletcher. Ospreay competed in his first AEW singles match at Road Rager on June 15, where he defeated Harwood. After the match, Ospreay and United Empire, including new IWGP Tag Team Champions O-Khan and Cobb, attacked FTR and Roppongi Vice once more, only to be interrupted by Orange Cassidy, who stared down Ospreay. Soon after, a singles match between both men was scheduled for Forbidden Door for Ospreay's IWGP United States Heavyweight Championship. A few days later, a Winner Takes All three-way tag team match between FTR, Roppongi Vice, and O-Khan and Cobb for the ROH World and IWGP Tag Team Championships was announced for the show as well.

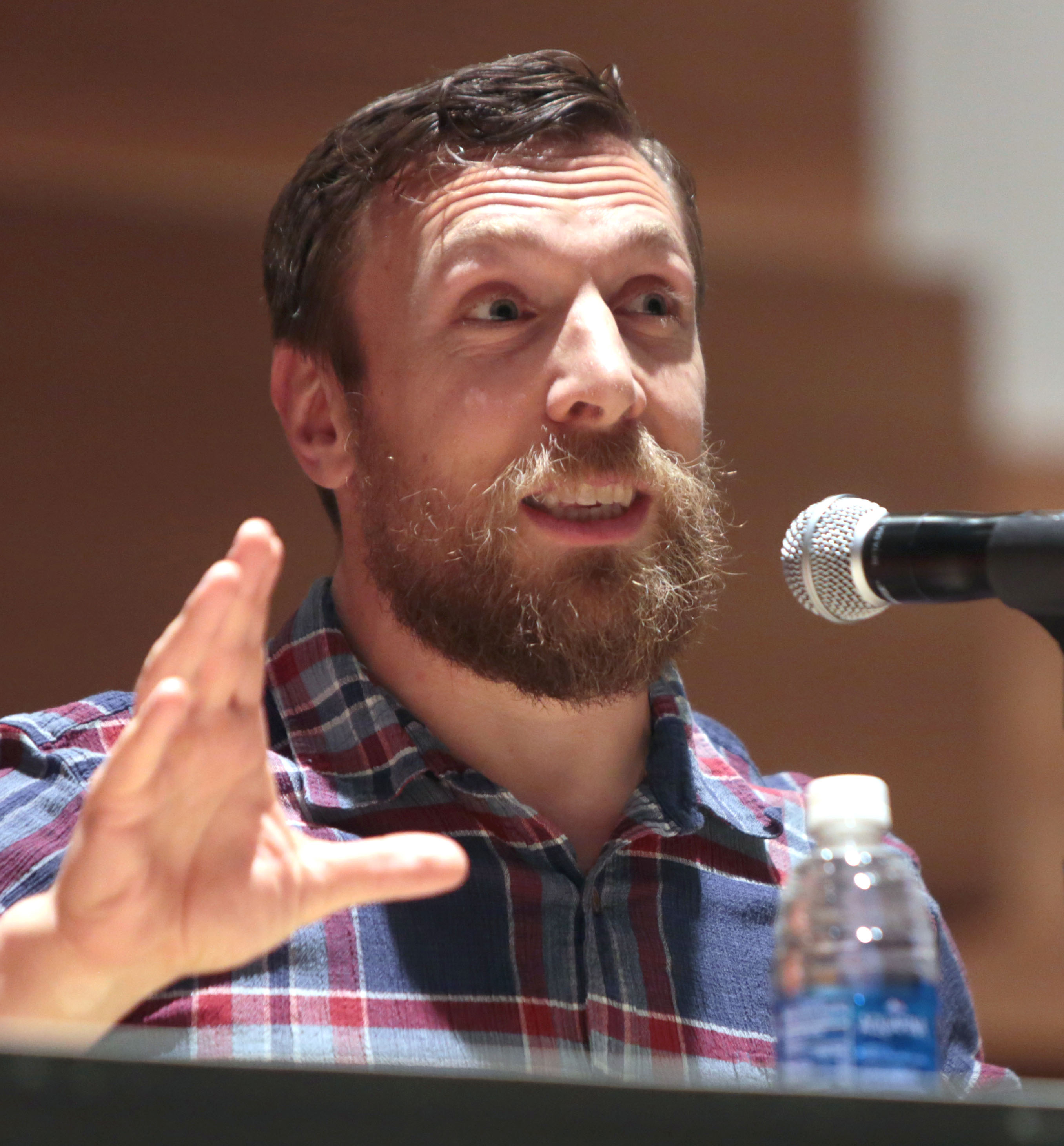
Bryan Danielson was scheduled to face Zack Sabre Jr. at the event; due to suffering an injury, an opponent of Danielson's choosing took the latter's place.

Since the announcement of Forbidden Door, Zack Sabre Jr. had continuously called out in post-match interviews, challenging "The American Dragon" Bryan Danielson to find out who the best technical wrestler was. However, following defeat in the Anarchy in the Arena match at Double or Nothing, it was speculated that Danielson had suffered an injury. This was confirmed by Danielson on the June 22 episode of Dynamite, yet he acknowledged Sabre Jr.'s challenge, revealing that he had organised a replacement as "the one person" he trusted to take his place at the PPV and the subsequent AEW Blood and Guts special episode of Dynamite. This led to Sabre Jr. making his AEW debut, verbally mocking Danielson.

Following their defeat in the Anarchy in the Arena match at Double or Nothing, Eddie Kingston along with Santana and Ortiz continued to feud with the Jericho Appreciation Society (JAS). On the June 1 episode of Dynamite, Blackpool Combat Club's (BCC) manager William Regal and Kingston issued a challenge to the JAS to fight the trio and the BCC in a Blood and Guts match, which Jericho declined. Ortiz then jumped Jericho from behind and cut a lock of Jericho's hair off, which led to Jericho accepting the match while also challenging Ortiz to a Hair vs. Hair match. On June 15 at Road Rager, Jericho defeated Ortiz in the match after seemingly receiving outside help from Fuego Del Sol, only for it to be revealed as Sammy Guevara under the mask, who would later be revealed to have joined the JAS along with his fiancé Tay Conti, turning both heels. Later in the night, Jericho interrupted the face-to-face confrontation between Moxley and Tanahashi, and both men were immediately attacked by Suzuki-gun members Lance Archer and El Desperado, despite additional help from Wheeler Yuta. Jericho announced that he and Sammy would team up with their leader, Minoru Suzuki, to face Kingston, Yuta, and Moxley's NJPW protege Shota Umino in a six-man tag team match.

On the June 8 episode of Dynamite, Thunder Rosa successfully defended her AEW Women's World Championship against Marina Shafir, only for Shafir to attack her after the match. Toni Storm rushed out to the ring to successfully stop Shafir's assault. Storm then picked up the championship belt, admired it, and handed it back to Rosa, indicating a possible future match against the two. Soon after, the match was made official for Forbidden Door.

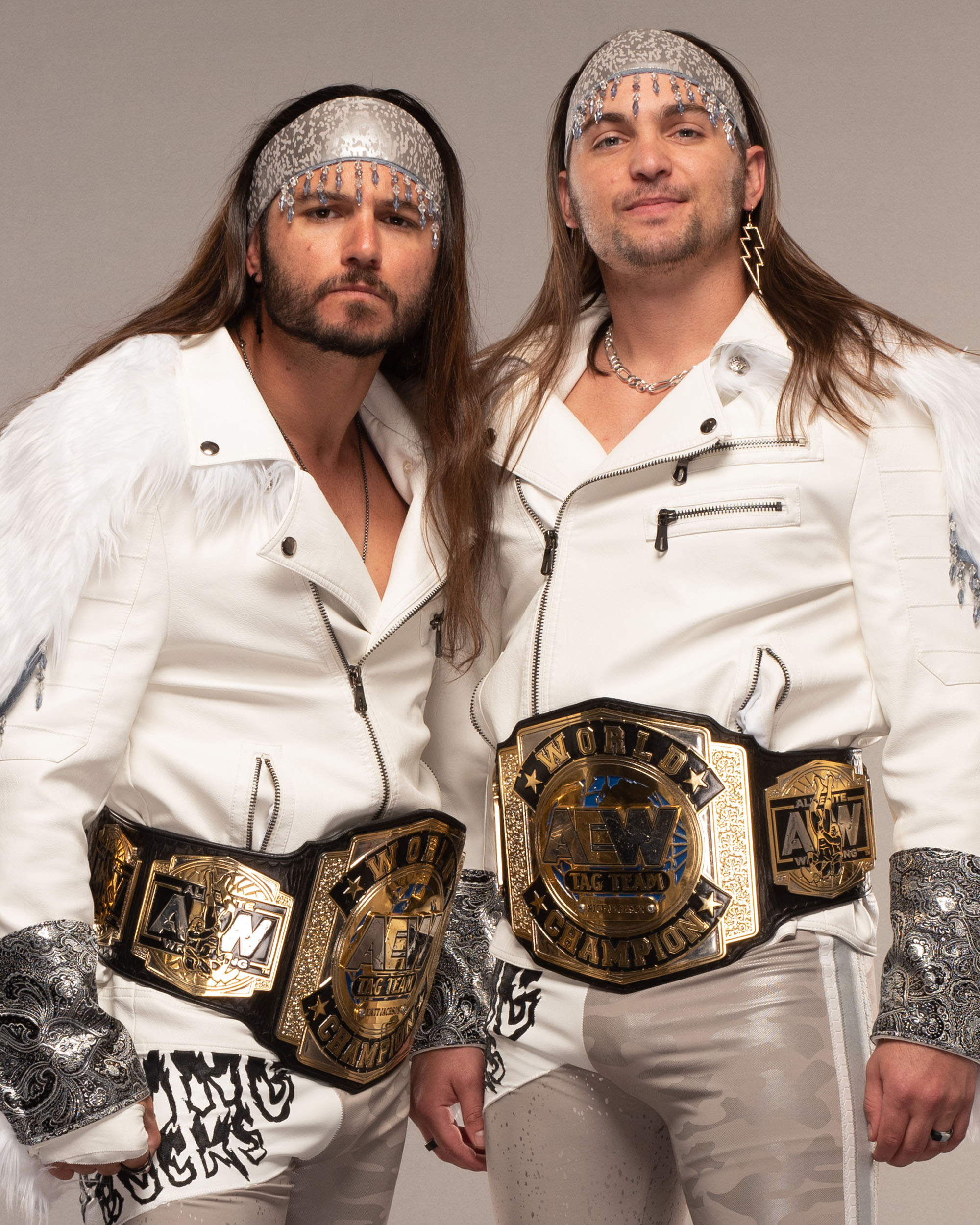
The Young Bucks (Matt Jackson on left and Nick Jackson on right) returned to Bullet Club for one night at the event.

In June, reDRagon (Bobby Fish and Kyle O'Reilly) began feuding with Darby Allin and Sting, which led to reDRagon challenging Allin to a match on the June 17 episode of Rampage. Allin defeated Fish, before being attacked by O'Reilly, however, Sting made the save, helping Allin fend off O'Reilly, with Allin breaking Fish's leg. The following week on Dynamite, O'Reilly and The Young Bucks (Matt Jackson and Nick Jackson) challenged them to a match at Forbidden Door with their partner being Hikuleo, rejoining Bullet Club for one night only. Allin and Sting accepted their challenge with their partners being Los Ingobernables de Japón's Hiromu Takahashi and Shingo Takagi. On June 23, it was announced that O'Reilly would be forced to miss the event, due to an injury, being replaced by El Phantasmo. On June 25, it was announced that Takahashi would be forced to miss the event, due to suffering from a fever, and that the match would be a trios match with Sting, Allin, and Takagi facing The Young Bucks and El Phantasmo.

== Event ==
Other on-screen personnel
Role	Name
Commentators	Excalibur
Commentators	Kevin Kelly
Commentators	Taz
Commentators	Jim Ross (last 4 matches)
Commentators	Tony Schiavone (Bullet Club vs. Dudes with Attitudes)
Commentators	Caprice Coleman (Three-way Tag Title match)
Japanese commentators	Haruo Murata
Japanese commentators	Milano Collection A.T.
Japanese commentators	Miki Motoi
Japanese commentators	Hollywood Zakoshisyoh (Guest commentator)
Spanish commentators	Alex Abrahantes
Spanish commentators	Dasha Gonzalez
Spanish commentators	Jon Cruz
French commentators	Alain Mistrangélo
French commentators	Norbert Feuillan
German commentators	Günter Zapf
German commentators	Mike Ritter
Ring announcer	Justin Roberts
Ring announcer	Takuro Shibata
Ring announcer	Bobby Cruise (Three-way Tag Title match)
Referees	Aubrey Edwards
Referees	Bryce Remsburg
Referees	Paul Turner
Referees	Rick Knox
Referees	Stephon Smith
Interviewer	Alex Marvez

=== The Buy-In ===
Four matches were contested on the Buy-In pre-show. In the first match, The Factory (Aaron Solo and Q. T. Marshall) faced Bishamon (Hirooki Goto and Yoshi-Hashi). Marshall went for a 450 splash, but Hashi avoided it. Hashi and Goto performed a Powerbomb/Spinning headlock elbow drop combo on Solo for the win.

Next, Lance Archer took on Nick Comoroto. Comoroto attempted to attack Archer before the match had begun, but Archer prevented it and took out Comoroto with a cannonball. In the end, Archer performed the Blackout on Comoroto to win the match.

After that, Swerve In Our Glory (Keith Lee and Swerve Strickland) took on Suzuki-gun (El Desperado and Yoshinobu Kanemaru). Strickland hit a backbreaker on Desperado, who came right back with a clothesline, which was followed by Strickland hitting him with a flatliner. Kanemaru took a swig from a whiskey bottle at ringside and spit the whiskey into Lee's eyes, which led to a nearfall. In the end, Lee performed the Big Bang Catastrophe on Kanemaru to secure the win. Following the match, Ricky Starks and Powerhouse Hobbs spoke from a luxury box. Hobbs stated that Strickland and Lee think they are Shaquille O'Neal and Kobe Bryant, and then compared himself and Starks to Michael Jordan and Scottie Pippen. Starks questioned how Strickland and Lee could call themselves the best tag team, when they have not beaten him and Hobbs.

In the final match of the pre-show, Max Caster (accompanied by Anthony Bowens) and Gunn Club (Billy Gunn, Austin Gunn, and Colten Gunn) faced Yuya Uemura and New Japan LA Dojo (Alex Coughlin, The DKC and Kevin Knight). Before the match began, Danhausen appeared on the screen and introduced a new "Ass Boys" theme, which caused Austin and Colten to run to the back. The NJPW dojo wrestlers took advantage of the numbers advantage while Austin and Colten were gone. In the end, Caster performed the Mic Drop on the DKC for the victory.

=== Preliminary matches ===
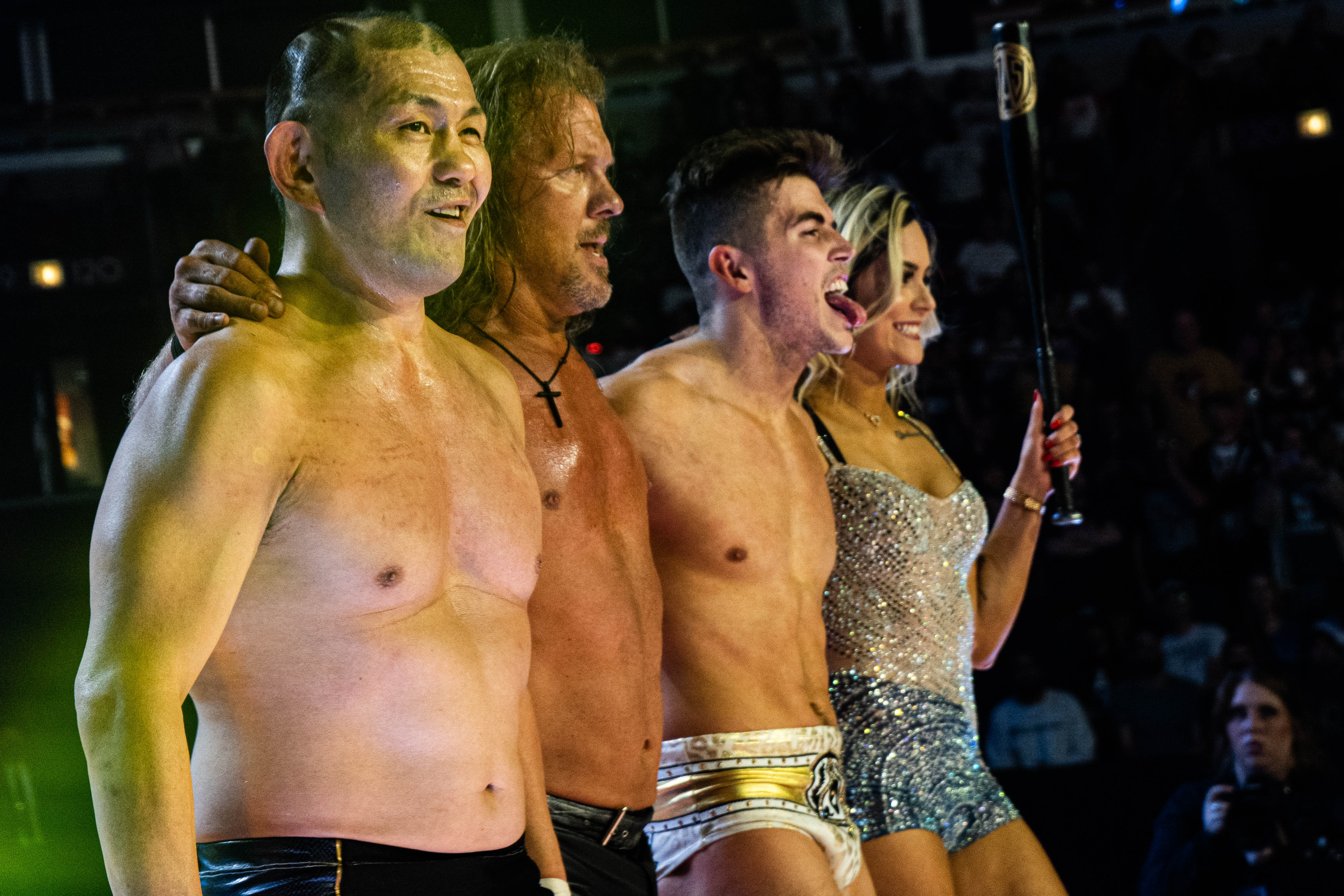
Minoru Suzuki and Jericho Appreciation Society (Chris Jericho and Sammy Guevara) with Tay Conti after defeating Eddie Kingston, Shota Umino, and Wheeler Yuta.

The actual pay-per-view opened with Minoru Suzuki and Jericho Appreciation Society (Chris Jericho and Sammy Guevara) (accompanied by Tay Conti) facing the team of Eddie Kingston, Shota Umino, and Wheeler Yuta, with the winning team receiving the man advantage for the upcoming Blood and Guts match between the Jericho Appreciation Society and Blackpool Combat Club. Early in the match, Yuta performed multiple German suplexes on Jericho. Yuta and Kingston performed suicide dives on Guevara and Jericho, respectively. In the final moments, Suzuki hit a Gotch-Style Piledriver on Kingston. Umino knocked both Guevara and Suzuki down, but Jericho took advantage and dropped Umino with a Judas Effect for the win, thus giving the Jericho Appreciation Society the man advantage for Blood and Guts.

Next was a Winner Takes All three-way tag team match for both the ROH World Tag Team Championship and IWGP Tag Team Championship between ROH World Tag Team Champions FTR (Cash Wheeler and Dax Harwood), IWGP Tag Team Champions United Empire (Great-O-Khan and Jeff Cobb), and Roppongi Vice (Rocky Romero and Trent Beretta). During the match, Harwood legitimately injured his left shoulder, leaving Wheeler to fly solo. Later, Harwood returned with his shoulder wrapped. Romero performed a suicide dive onto Harwood and Khan on the floor. FTR hit Romero with the Big Rig to win the IWGP Tag Team Championships and retain the ROH World Tag Team Championships.

Backstage, Tony Schiavone interviewed Juice Robinson and Jay White. Robinson had the IWGP United States Heavyweight Championship and White noted that Robinson never lost the title. White also spoke about retaining his IWGP World Heavyweight Championship later in the night.

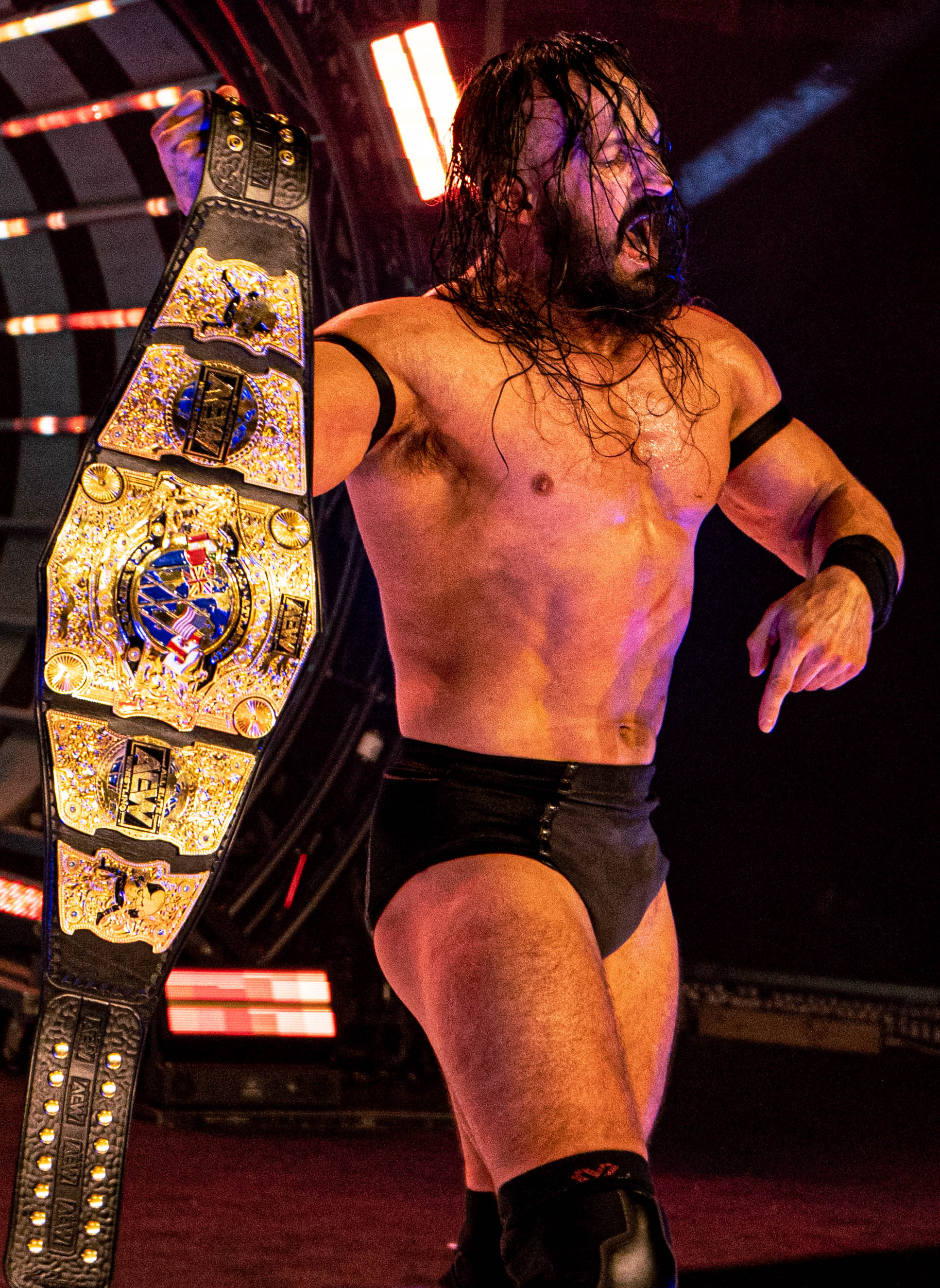
Pac became the inaugural AEW All-Atlantic Champion at the event by defeating Clark Connors, Miro, and Malakai Black in a four-way match.

After that was the inaugural AEW All-Atlantic Championship four-way match between Pac, Clark Connors, Miro, and Malakai Black. Outside the ring, Connors landed a Spear on Miro through a table. Back in the ring, Miro applied the Game Over submission on Pac but was broken up by Black who sprayed a mist into Miro's face. As Black and Connors were fighting over an armbar, Pac performed a 450 Splash on Black and applied the Brutalizer submission on Connors to become the inaugural AEW All-Atlantic Champion.

The next match was between Dudes with Attitudes (Darby Allin, Sting, and Shingo Takagi) against Bullet Club (El Phantasmo, Matt Jackson, and Nick Jackson) (accompanied by Hikuleo). As the Bullet Club was making their entrances, Sting dove onto Bullet Club from the top of one of the entrance tunnels. Allin hit a cutter on Phantasmo, but the Young Bucks took Allin out with a double superkick. Takagi performed the Last of the Dragon on Phantasmo to win the match.

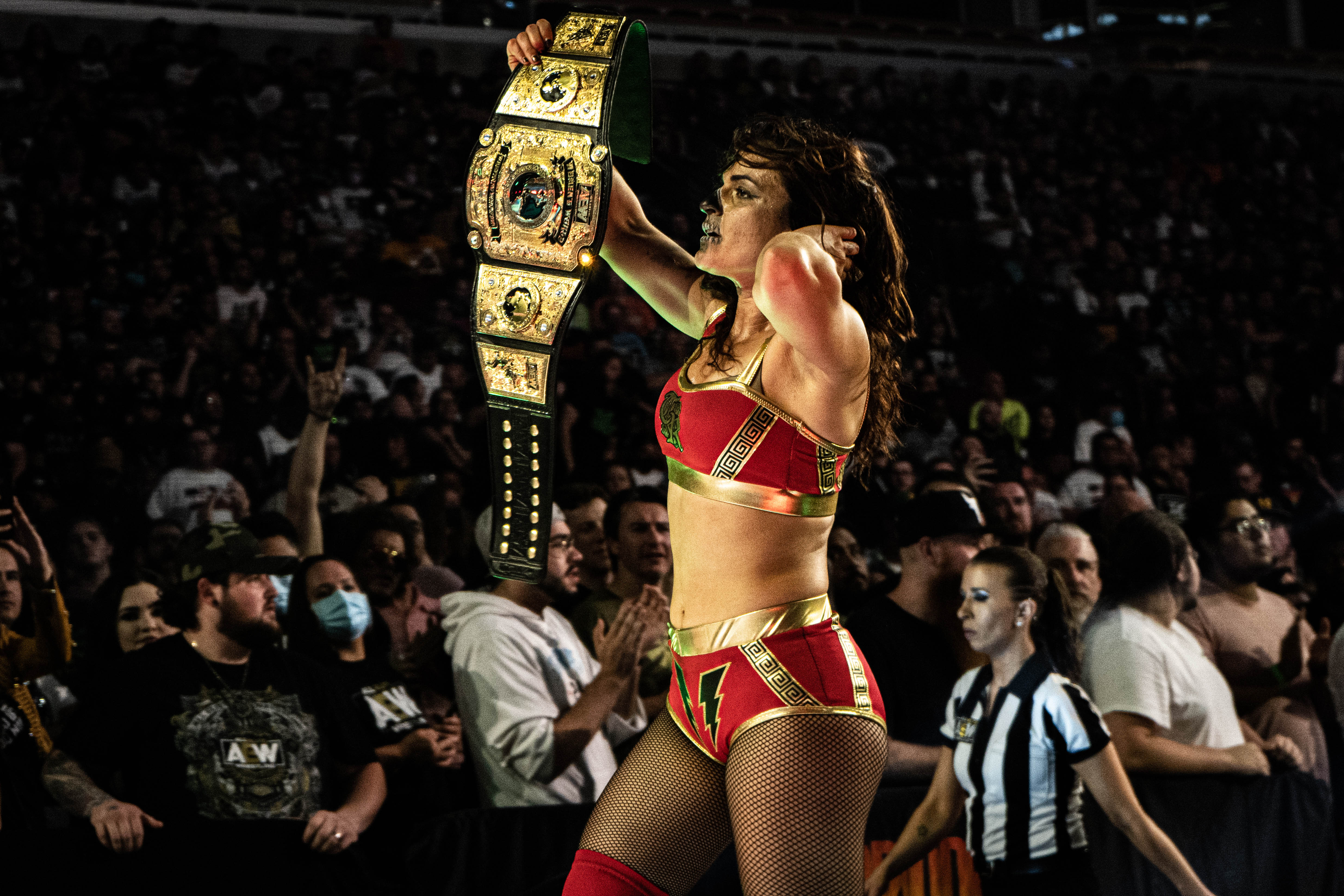
Thunder Rosa after retaining the AEW Women's World Championship against Toni Storm.

Next, Thunder Rosa defended the AEW Women's World Championship against Toni Storm. Rosa ended up at ringside and stuffed a Tornado DDT attempt and suplexed Storm. Storm executed a Tornado DDT on Rosa on the floor. Back in the ring, Rosa performed a Fire Thunder Driver on Storm for a near fall. Storm attempted the Storm Zero, but her shoulder gave out. Rosa then performed the Final Reckoning on Storm to retain the title. After the match, Rosa and Storm shook hands.

In the sixth match, Will Ospreay (accompanied by Aussie Open) defended the IWGP United States Heavyweight Championship against Orange Cassidy. Cassidy performed a Stundog Millionaire and Michinoku Driver on Ospreay for a near fall. Cassidy removed his elbow pad and attempted an Orange Punch on Ospreay, who countered and hit Cassidy with a cutter. Ospreay went for a Storm Breaker, but Cassidy countered into a frankensteiner for a near fall. Cassidy held up his thumb and Ospreay performed the Storm Breaker to retain the title. Following the match, Ospreay instructed Fletcher and Davis to take out Cassidy. Roppongi Vice (Rocky Romero and Trent Beretta) ran out to Cassidy's aid, but they were cleared from the ring. They were interrupted by Katsuyori Shibata, who attacked Ospreay and Aussie Open. Cassidy approached Shibata and teased putting his sunglasses on, but instead put them on Shibata and struck his thumbs-up pose.

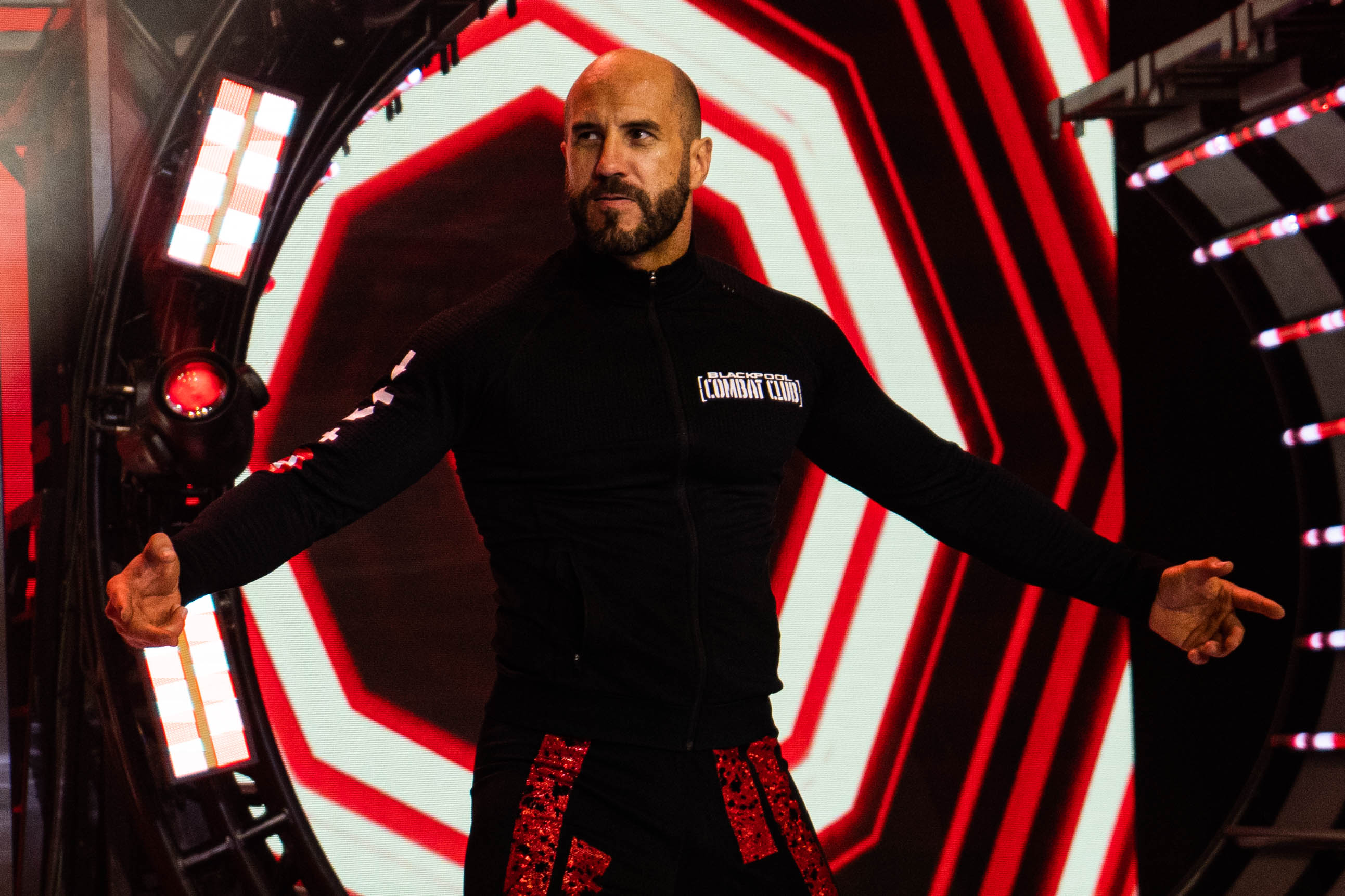
Claudio Castagnoli made his unannounced AEW debut at the event as Bryan Danielson's handpicked opponent for Zack Sabre Jr.

Subsequently, Zack Sabre Jr. came out for his match against an opponent who was pre-selected by Bryan Danielson. Claudio Castagnoli made his unannounced AEW debut as Sabre Jr.'s opponent and also became the newest member of Blackpool Combat Club. At the start of the match, Castagnoli performed a Neutralizer on Sabre Jr. for a near fall. A short time later when Sabre stood up, Castagnoli dropped him with a forearm shot. Castagnoli performed the Swing on Sabre Jr. and attempted a sharpshooter, but Sabre Jr. countered into a heel hook submission. Castagnoli broke free and later hit Sabre Jr. with an uppercut and a lariat and then performed the Ricola Bomb on the latter to win the match.

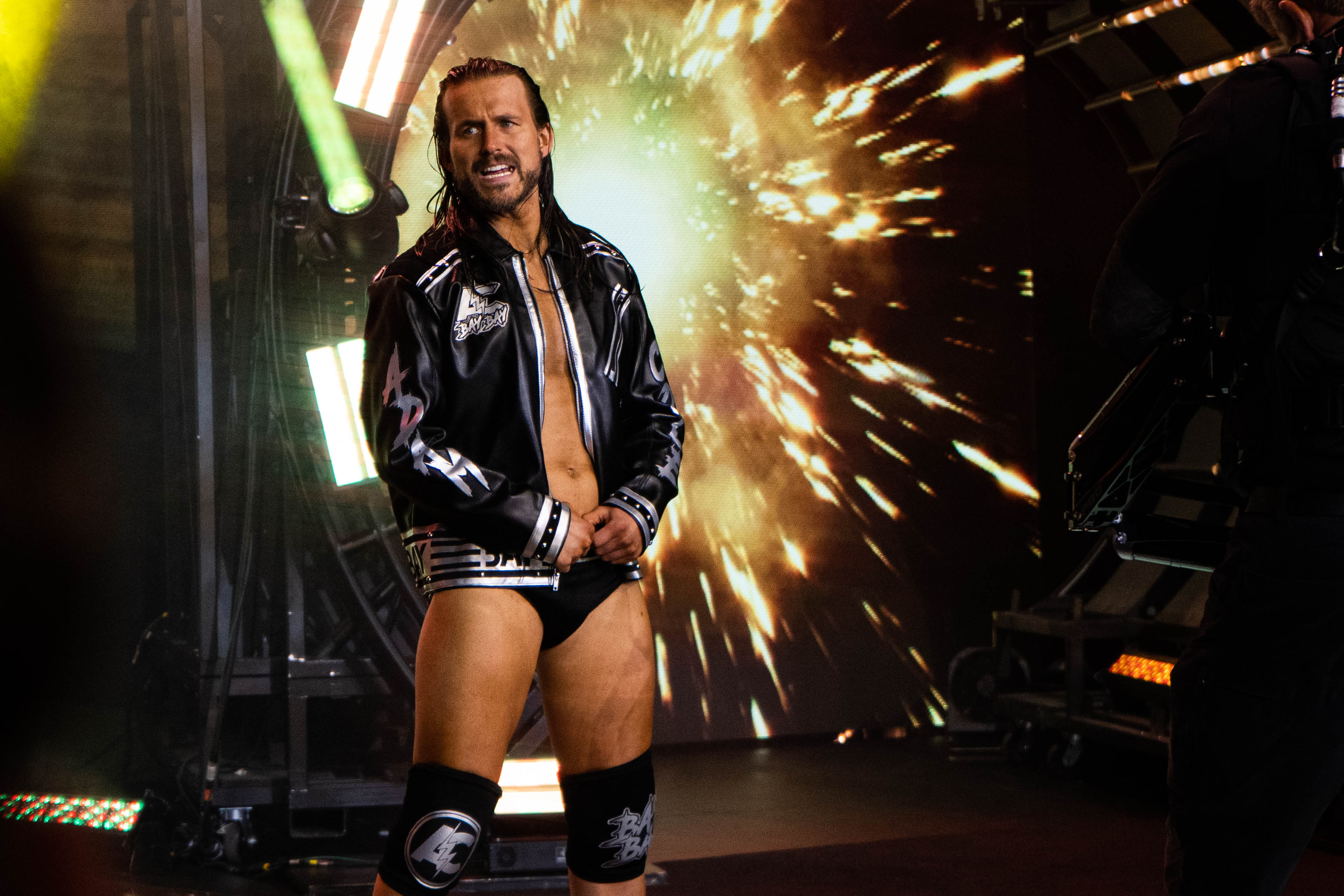
Adam Cole, one of the challengers for the IWGP World Heavyweight Championship at Forbidden Door.

In the penultimate match, Jay White (accompanied by Gedo) defended the IWGP World Heavyweight Championship against Kazuchika Okada, "Hangman" Adam Page, and Adam Cole in a four-way match. Cole attempted the Boom on White, but White ducked it and performed a Uranage Slam on Cole. Cole hit White with the Boom, Okada landed a dropkick on Cole, Page executed a lariat on Okada and all four men were down temporarily. White attempted a Bladerunner on Page, who countered with a Dead Eye. As Page performed the Buckshot Lariat on White, Okada broke up the pin. Cole hit multiple superkicks on Page and Okada for a near fall. White executed another Blade Runner on Okada and pinned Cole to retain the title.

=== Main event ===
In the main event, Jon Moxley took on Hiroshi Tanahashi to determine the interim AEW World Champion. Early in the match, Moxley performed a piledriver on Tanahashi for a near fall. Outside the ring, Tanahashi landed a crossbody block on a bloodied Moxley. Back in the ring, Moxley applied a bulldog choke submission on Tanahashi, who escaped the hold. Tanahashi slapped Moxley multiple times and ran the ropes, but Moxley blasted him with a clothesline. Moxley covered Tanahashi, but Tanahashi kicked out at one. Moxley applied the rear naked choke submission, who later released the hold and executed the Paradigm Shift on Tanahashi to become the interim AEW World Champion. Post-match, Moxley celebrated his victory. Chris Jericho and Daniel Garcia ran out and attacked Moxley and Tanahashi. Eddie Kingston ran out and went after Jericho, but Garcia put him in a sleeper. Wheeler Yuta, Santana, and Ortiz ran out and attacked Jericho and Garcia. Jake Hager, Matt Menard, Angelo Parker, and Sammy Guevara ran out to help Jericho and Garcia. Castagnoli ran out and went after Jericho. The Jericho Appreciation Society fled and lost the brawl, culminating in the Blackpool Combat Club celebrating.

== Aftermath ==
The following episode of Dynamite was the special episode Blood and Guts. Due to Chris Jericho, Sammy Guevara, and Minoru Suzuki defeating Shota Umino, Wheeler Yuta, and Eddie Kingston, the Jericho Appreciation Society earned the advantage in the Blood and Guts match. Additionally, due to Bryan Danielson's injury preventing him from participating in Blood and Guts, Claudio Castagnoli took his place in the match. The match resulted in the Blackpool Combat Club, Kingston, Santana, and Ortiz defeating the Jericho Appreciation Society.

Due to Hirooki Goto and YOSHI-HASHI's win over The Factory, The Young Bucks challenged them to a match on the Rampage special episode Royal Rampage for an opportunity at the Bucks' AEW World Tag Team Championship, however at the show Goto and Yoshi-Hashi were defeated.

On March 15, 2023, a second Forbidden Door event between AEW and NJPW was scheduled to be held on June 25, 2023.

== Results ==
No.	Results	Stipulations	Times
1^{P}	Bishamon (Hirooki Goto and Yoshi-Hashi) defeated The Factory (Aaron Solo and Q. T. Marshall) by pinfall	Tag team match	8:53
2^{P}	Lance Archer defeated Nick Comoroto by pinfall	Singles match	6:08
3^{P}	Swerve In Our Glory (Keith Lee and Swerve Strickland) defeated Suzuki-gun (El Desperado and Yoshinobu Kanemaru) by pinfall	Tag team match	12:08
4^{P}	Max Caster and Gunn Club (Billy Gunn, Austin Gunn, and Colten Gunn) (with Anthony Bowens) defeated Yuya Uemura and New Japan LA Dojo (Alex Coughlin, The DKC and Kevin Knight) by pinfall	Eight-man tag team match	5:35
5	Minoru Suzuki and Le Sex Gods (Chris Jericho and Sammy Guevara) (with Tay Conti) defeated Eddie Kingston, Shota Umino, and Wheeler Yuta by pinfall	Six-man tag team match The winning team received the man advantage for the Blood and Guts match.	18:58
6	FTR (Cash Wheeler and Dax Harwood) (ROH) defeated United Empire (Great-O-Khan and Jeff Cobb) (IWGP) and Roppongi Vice (Rocky Romero and Trent Beretta) by pinfall	Winners Take All Three-way tag team match for the ROH World Tag Team Championship and IWGP Tag Team Championship	16:19
7	Pac defeated Clark Connors, Miro, and Malakai Black by submission	Four-way match for the inaugural AEW All-Atlantic Championship	15:10
8	Dudes with Attitudes (Darby Allin, Sting, and Shingo Takagi) defeated Bullet Club (El Phantasmo, Matt Jackson, and Nick Jackson) (with Hikuleo) by pinfall	Six-man tag team match	13:01
9	Thunder Rosa (c) defeated Toni Storm by pinfall	Singles match for the AEW Women's World Championship	10:42
10	Will Ospreay (c) (with Aussie Open (Kyle Fletcher and Mark Davis)) defeated Orange Cassidy by pinfall	Singles match for the IWGP United States Heavyweight Championship	16:43
11	Claudio Castagnoli defeated Zack Sabre Jr. by pinfall	Singles match	18:26
12	Jay White (c) (with Gedo) defeated "Hangman" Adam Page, Kazuchika Okada, and Adam Cole by pinfall	Four-way match for the IWGP World Heavyweight Championship	21:05
13	Jon Moxley (with William Regal) defeated Hiroshi Tanahashi by pinfall	Singles match for the interim AEW World Championship	18:14
(c) / – the champion(s) heading into the match; P / – the match was broadcast on the pre-show

=== AEW Interim World Championship Eliminator Series bracket ===
Qualifiers; Dynamite (June 8, 2022); Dominion 6.12 in Osaka-jo Hall (June 12, 2022)
Jon Moxley	Pin
Kyle O'Reilly (Note: He won a 21-Man Casino Battle Royal earlier that night to qualify for the tournament.)	14:15
Hiroshi Tanahashi	Pin
Hirooki Goto	12:40

Final; Forbidden Door (June 26, 2022)
Jon Moxley	Pin
Hiroshi Tanahashi	18:14

Casino Battle Royale
Dynamite – June 8 (Cable Dahmer Arena – Independence, Missouri, U.S.)

No.	Results	Stipulations	Times
1	Kyle O'Reilly won by last eliminating Wheeler Yuta	21-Man Casino Battle Royale for a chance to qualify for the AEW Interim World Championship Eliminator Series	10:05

Casino Battle Royale entrances and eliminations
– Winner

Draw	Ent. Order	Entrant	Elmin. Order	Eliminated by	Eliminations
Clubs	1	Lance Archer	2	Keith Lee	0
Clubs	2	Tony Nese	1	Keith Lee	0
Clubs	3	Daniel Garcia	8	Eddie Kingston	0
Clubs	4	Darby Allin	15	Swerve Strickland	1
Clubs	5	Eddie Kingston	9	Jake Hager	1
Diamonds	6	Ricky Starks	13	Rey Fénix	2
Diamonds	7	Jake Hager	10	Wheeler Yuta	1
Diamonds	8	Rey Fénix	18	Andrade El Ídolo	2
Diamonds	9	Swerve Strickland	16	Andrade El Ídolo	2
Diamonds	10	Keith Lee	6	Swerve Strickland	4
Hearts	11	John Silver	7	Powerhouse Hobbs	0
Hearts	12	Konosuke Takeshita	11	Powerhouse Hobbs & Ricky Starks	0
Hearts	13	Max Caster	3	Rey Fénix	0
Hearts	14	Austin Gunn	5	Keith Lee	0
Hearts	15	Colten Gunn	4	Keith Lee	0
Spades	16	Powerhouse Hobbs	17	Wheeler Yuta	2
Spades	17	Bobby Fish	14	Darby Allin	0
Spades	18	Kyle O'Reilly	—	Winner	2
Spades	19	Dante Martin	12	Ricky Starks	0
Spades	20	Wheeler Yuta	20	Kyle O'Reilly	3
Joker	21	Andrade El Ídolo	19	Kyle O'Reilly and Wheeler Yuta	2

=== AEW All-Atlantic Championship inaugural tournament bracket ===
Preliminary Qualifiers; New Japan Road (June 20, 2022)
AEW International Championship
Inaugural championship tournament

Qualifiers; Dynamite (June 8, 15, and 22, 2022); New Japan Road (June 21, 2022)

Final; Forbidden Door (June 26, 2022)

== See also ==
- 2022 in professional wrestling
- List of AEW tournaments
- List of All Elite Wrestling pay-per-view events
- List of major NJPW events
