= Special Events Center =

Special Events Center may refer to:

- The CFSB Center, an arena in Murray, Kentucky, United States, formerly known as the Regional Special Events Center
- The Curtis Culwell Center, formerly known as the Garland Special Events Center, an arena and convention center in Garland, Texas, United States
- The Don Haskins Center, an arena in El Paso, Texas, United States, known as the Special Events Center from 1976 to 1998
- The Frank C. Erwin, Jr. Special Events Center, commonly known as the Frank Erwin Center, an arena in Austin, Texas, United States
- The Greensboro Coliseum Special Events Center, an exhibition center at the Greensboro Coliseum Complex in Greensboro, North Carolina, United States
- The Jon M. Huntsman Center, an arena in Salt Lake City, Utah, United States, known as the Special Events Center from 1969 to 1987
