= AEW Winter Is Coming =

All Elite Wrestling television special series

- AEW Winter Is Coming logo for Dynamite used as of 2024
- Promotions: All Elite Wrestling
- First event: 2020

AEW Winter Is Coming is an annual professional wrestling television special produced by the American promotion All Elite Wrestling (AEW). The event was established in 2020 and airs in December. Its title is a reference to the Game of Thrones motto "Winter Is Coming" and its eponymous television episode. The show is distributed by Warner Bros. Discovery, the parent company of AEW's broadcast partners, TNT and TBS, as well as HBO Max.

The event originally aired as a special episode of the promotion's flagship weekly television program, Wednesday Night Dynamite, but the 2023 event expanded the show to a three-part special, also encompassing Friday Night Rampage and Saturday Night Collision. Following the cancellation of Rampage at the end of 2024, the 2025 event was reduced to two nights, airing as Dynamite and Collision.

== History ==
On the November 18, 2020, episode of Wednesday Night Dynamite, All Elite Wrestling (AEW) announced that the December 2 episode would be a special episode titled "Winter Is Coming". The phrase was the title of the pilot episode of the Game of Thrones television series, as well as the motto (or "Words") of House Stark of Winterfell in the series. The use of the title was approved by WarnerMedia officials, as WarnerMedia, now Warner Bros. Discovery (WBD), has used Dynamite to promote HBO Max and other WarnerMedia properties. The event was notable for the debut of former World Championship Wrestling (WCW) legend Sting in AEW, which was his first appearance on TNT in over 19 years since he defeated Ric Flair on the final episode of WCW Monday Nitro in March 2001. Due to the COVID-19 pandemic, the event was held at Daily's Place in Jacksonville, Florida.

On the November 19, 2021, episode of Friday Night Rampage, it was announced that a second Winter Is Coming would air as the December 15 episode of Dynamite. This established Winter Is Coming as an annual December television special of Dynamite. With AEW's return to live touring in July 2021, this second event was held at the Curtis Culwell Center in Garland, Texas.

The third Winter Is Coming was held as the December 14, 2022, episode of Dynamite. It was also confirmed that the event would return to the Curtis Culwell Center in Garland, Texas. This was the first Winter Is Coming to air on TNT's sister channel, TBS, after Dynamite moved to the channel earlier in January that year. The fourth Winter Is Coming was originally scheduled to just be held on December 13, 2023. However, in addition to Dynamite on TBS on December 13 in Arlington at the College Park Center, the 2023 event was expanded to a three-part special, also encompassing the broadcasts of Friday Night Rampage and Saturday Night Collision, both on TNT. Rampage was taped after the live broadcast of Dynamite and aired on tape delay on December 15, with Collision airing live on December 16 and held at the Curtis Culwell Center in Garland.

The fifth Winter Is Coming was held as the December 11, 13, and 14, 2024, episodes of Dynamite, Rampage, and Collision, respectively, The Dynamite episode took place live on December 11 at the T-Mobile Center in Kansas City, Missouri, airing on TBS. Rampage was taped on December 11 after Dynamite's live broadcast and aired on tape delay on December 13 on TNT, while Collision was taped on December 12 at Chaifetz Arena in St. Louis, Missouri and aired on tape delay on December 14, also on TNT. This marked the first Winter Is Coming to be held outside of Texas since the original 2020 event.

The sixth Winter Is Coming was held as the December 10 and 13, 2025, episodes of Dynamite and Collision, respectively. The Dynamite episode took place live at the Gateway Center Arena in College Park, Georgia, simulcast on TBS and HBO Max. The Collision episode was held live at Utilita Arena in Cardiff, Wales, United Kingdom on December 13, simulcast on TNT and HBO Max. This marked the first Winter Is Coming special to be held outside the United States and also reduced it to a two-part special as the prior two years had aired in three parts including Rampage, which was canceled at the end of 2024. This also marked the first Winter Is Coming to stream on HBO Max, following AEW's updated broadcast deal with WBD that began earlier that year in January. The Dynamite broadcast also saw the crowning of the inaugural AEW Women's World Tag Team Champions, won by The Babes of Wrath (Willow Nightingale and Harley Cameron).

== Events ==
#	Event	Date	City	Venue	Main event	Ref.
1	Winter Is Coming (2020)	Dynamite; December 2, 2020	Jacksonville, Florida	Daily's Place	Jon Moxley (c) vs. Kenny Omega for the AEW World Championship	
2	Winter Is Coming (2021)	Dynamite; December 15, 2021	Garland, Texas	Curtis Culwell Center	MJF vs. Dante Martin for the AEW Dynamite Diamond Ring	
3	Winter Is Coming (2022)	Dynamite; December 14, 2022	Garland, Texas	Curtis Culwell Center	MJF (c) vs. Ricky Starks in a Winner Takes All match for the AEW World Championship and AEW Dynamite Diamond Ring	
4	Winter Is Coming (2023)	Dynamite; December 13, 2023	Arlington, Texas	College Park Center	Jon Moxley vs. Swerve Strickland in a Continental Classic Gold League match	
4	Winter Is Coming (2023)	Rampage; December 13, 2023 (aired December 15)	Arlington, Texas	College Park Center	Top Flight (Dante Martin and Darius Martin) and Action Andretti vs. Komander, El Hijo del Vikingo, and Penta El Zero Miedo	
4	Winter Is Coming (2023)	Collision; December 16, 2023	Garland, Texas	Curtis Culwell Center	Bryan Danielson vs. Brody King in a Continental Classic Blue League match	
5	Winter Is Coming (2024)	Dynamite; December 11, 2024	Kansas City, Missouri	T-Mobile Center	Mariah May (c) vs. Mina Shirakawa for the AEW Women's World Championship	
5	Winter Is Coming (2024)	Rampage; December 11, 2024 (aired December 13)	Kansas City, Missouri	T-Mobile Center	Powerhouse Hobbs and Mark Davis vs. Don Callis Family (Konosuke Takeshita and Lance Archer)	
5	Winter Is Coming (2024)	Collision; December 12, 2024 (aired December 14)	St Louis, Missouri	Chaifetz Arena	Kyle Fletcher vs. Mark Briscoe in a Continental Classic Blue League match	
6	Winter Is Coming (2025)	Dynamite; December 10, 2025	College Park, Georgia	Gateway Center Arena	Samoa Joe (c) vs. Eddie Kingston for the AEW World Championship	
6	Winter Is Coming (2025)	Collision; December 13, 2025	Cardiff, Wales	Utilita Arena	Mark Briscoe (c) vs. Daniel Garcia for the AEW TNT Championship	
(c) – refers to the champion(s) heading into the match

== See also ==
- List of All Elite Wrestling special events
- List of AEW Dynamite special episodes
- List of AEW Rampage special episodes
- List of AEW Collision special episodes
