= Winter Is Coming (2020) =

All Elite Wrestling television special

- Promotional poster featuring Jon Moxley and Kenny Omega
- Promotion: All Elite Wrestling
- Date: December 2, 2020
- City: Jacksonville, Florida
- Venue: Daily's Place
- Attendance: 1,000
- Tagline: War Is Here

Winter Is Coming chronology
← Previous; First	Next → 2021

AEW Dynamite special episodes chronology
← Previous; Fight for the Fallen	Next → Holiday Bash

The 2020 Winter Is Coming was the inaugural Winter Is Coming professional wrestling television special produced by All Elite Wrestling (AEW). The event took place on December 2, 2020, at Daily's Place in Jacksonville, Florida. It was broadcast on TNT as a special episode of AEW's weekly television program, Wednesday Night Dynamite.

Five matches were contested at the event. In the main event, Kenny Omega defeated Jon Moxley to win the AEW World Championship. In other prominent matches, Chris Jericho defeated Frankie Kazarian and AEW TNT Champion Darby Allin and Cody Rhodes defeated Team Taz (Ricky Starks and Powerhouse Hobbs).

The event is notable for the debut of former World Championship Wrestling (WCW) legend Sting in AEW, which was his first appearance on TNT in over 19 years since he defeated Ric Flair on the final episode of WCW Monday Nitro.

== Production ==
Other on-screen personnel
Role	Name
Commentators	Jim Ross
Commentators	Excalibur
Commentators	Tony Schiavone
Commentators	Don Callis (Moxley vs. Omega)
Ring announcer	Justin Roberts
Referees	Aubrey Edwards
Referees	Bryce Remsburg
Referees	Frank Gastineau
Referees	Mike Posey
Referees	Paul Turner
Referees	Rick Knox
Interviewer	Alex Marvez

=== Background ===
On the November 18, 2020, episode of Dynamite, All Elite Wrestling (AEW) announced that the December 2 episode would be a special episode titled "Winter Is Coming". Due to the ongoing COVID-19 pandemic, the event was held at Daily's Place in Jacksonville, Florida. The company billed the Moxley–Omega match as "the biggest match in Dynamite history" and the event as their "biggest Dynamite" to date.

The episode's title "Winter Is Coming" was derived from Game of Thrones, a television series from HBO, which is part of the WarnerMedia subsidiary of AT&T, which also includes AEW broadcast partner TNT. The phrase was the title of the pilot episode of Game of Thrones as well as the motto (or "Words") of House Stark of Winterfell. The use of the title was approved by WarnerMedia officials, as WarnerMedia has used Dynamite to promote HBO Max and other WarnerMedia properties.

=== Storylines ===
Winter Is Coming featured professional wrestling matches that involved different wrestlers from pre-existing scripted feuds and storylines. Wrestlers portrayed heroes, villains, or less distinguishable characters in scripted events that built tension and culminated in a wrestling match or series of matches. Storylines were produced on AEW's weekly television program, Dynamite, the supplementary online streaming show, Dark, and The Young Bucks' YouTube series Being The Elite.

At Full Gear, Kenny Omega defeated Adam Page, his former tag team partner, in the final of an eight-man eliminator tournament to receive a future AEW World Championship match. On the November 11, 2020, episode of Dynamite, it was announced that Jon Moxley would defend the AEW World Championship against Omega on the December 2 episode.

== Reception ==
The event was attended by a sellout crowd of 1,000 socially distant spectators (the limit on the 5,500 seat venue caused by pandemic restrictions) and received positive reception from critics and fans, with many praising Sting's debut and the Moxley–Omega match, which Dave Meltzer of Wrestling Observer Newsletter gave 4.5 stars on his 5 star rating system. However, there was controversy regarding the finish of the match and post-match angle with an apparent Impact Wrestling working relationship, which later crashed Impact's website. Erik Beaston of Bleacher Report said the battle royal "furthered several on-going storylines", Sting's debut "warms the soul", Moxley–Omega was "fantastic up until the overbooked finish", and the cross-promotional storytelling with Impact is a "game-changer". Wade Keller of Pro Wrestling Torch said the battle royal was "really good", Sting's debut was "well done" and a "big moment", he "would have watched another 30 minutes" of Moxley–Omega, and the Impact Wrestling relationship is "interesting".

In less than 24 hours, Sting’s first AEW shirt set a new Pro Wrestling Tees record for the most shirts sold in 24 hours. Sting's appearance was the 10th most searched topic on the Internet on December 3 and the clip of his AEW debut peaked at #3 on YouTube's trending feed, along with the clip of Moxley–Omega's match peaking at #8.

=== Television ratings ===
Winter Is Coming averaged 913,000 viewers on TNT and drew a 0.42 rating in the key demographic.

== Aftermath ==
After his debut, it was announced that Sting had signed a multi-year deal with AEW and he would speak on the following week's Dynamite. Also announced for the next Dynamite was an ultimatum for The Inner Circle to decide whether to unite or break up. Several matches were announced: Lance Archer and Lucha Brothers vs. Eddie Kingston and The Butcher and The Blade, The Young Bucks vs. The Hybrid 2, FTR vs. Varsity Blondes (Griff Garrison and Brian Pillman Jr.), Dustin Rhodes vs. Preston Vance, and MJF vs. Orange Cassidy in the Dynamite Diamond Final for the AEW Dynamite Diamond Ring. On December 7, it was announced that Shaquille O'Neal would appear on the December 9 episode of Dynamite and address AEW with Tony Schiavone.

Kenny Omega defeated Jon Moxley for the AEW World Championship, with help from long-time friend and Impact Wrestling Executive Vice President Don Callis, who did guest commentary for the match. After the match, they immediately left the building and were about to get into a car when Callis responded to interviewer Alex Marvez by saying he and Omega would explain things next Tuesday on Impact!. It was later officially confirmed by Impact Wrestling. Following Winter Is Coming, Don Callis became Kenny Omega's Manager. Following their appearance on the December 7 episode of Impact!, Omega and Callis appeared on the December 9 episode of Dynamite to make an announcement.

A second Winter Is Coming was held the following year, thus establishing Winter Is Coming as an annual December television special of Dynamite. The 2023 event then expanded Winter Is Coming to a three-part special, also encompassing Friday Night Rampage and Saturday Night Collision, AEW's second and third weekly television programs that premiered in August 2021 and June 2023, respectively. It was reduced to two nights following Rampage's cancellation at the end of 2024.

== Results ==
No.	Results	Stipulations	Times
1	MJF and Orange Cassidy co-won by last eliminating Wardlow (Note: Other competitors by order of elimination: Isiah Kassidy, Serpentico, Luther, Matt Sydal, Shawn Spears, Scorpio Sky, Alex Reynolds, John Silver, Adam Page, Kip Sabian, Lee Johnson, Marq Quen, Matt Hardy, Joey Janela, Miro, Sammy Guevara, and Jungle Boy)	Dynamite Diamond Battle Royale to determine the two competitors in the Dynamite Diamond Final for the AEW Dynamite Diamond Ring on Dynamite on December 9, 2020.	12:51
2	Chris Jericho (with Jake Hager and Ortiz) defeated Frankie Kazarian	Singles match	10:34
3	Dr. Britt Baker, D.M.D. (with Rebel) defeated Leyla Hirsch	Singles match	9:19
4	Darby Allin and Cody Rhodes (with Arn Anderson) defeated Team Taz (Ricky Starks and Powerhouse Hobbs) (with Taz)	Tag team match	10:32
5	Kenny Omega defeated Jon Moxley (c)	Singles match for the AEW World Championship	28:31
(c) / – the champion(s) heading into the match

== See also ==
- 2020 in professional wrestling
