= Winter Is Coming (2021) =

All Elite Wrestling television special

- Promotional poster featuring "Hangman" Adam Page and Bryan Danielson
- Promotion: All Elite Wrestling
- Date: December 15, 2021
- City: Garland, Texas
- Venue: Curtis Culwell Center
- Attendance: 6,002
- Tagline: War Is Here

Winter Is Coming chronology
| ← Previous; 2020 | Next → 2022 |

AEW Dynamite special episodes chronology
| ← Previous; Grand Slam | Next → Holiday Bash |

The 2021 Winter Is Coming was the second annual Winter Is Coming professional wrestling television special produced by All Elite Wrestling (AEW). The event took place on December 15, 2021, at the Curtis Culwell Center in Garland, Texas. It was broadcast live on TNT as a special episode of AEW's weekly television program, Wednesday Night Dynamite.

Four matches were contested at the event. In the main event, MJF defeated Dante Martin to win the AEW Dynamite Diamond Ring for the third time. The event was highly praised by fans and critics, with particular praise going towards the opening bout between defending AEW World Champion "Hangman" Adam Page and Bryan Danielson; their match ended in a 60-minute time limit draw. Wrestling journalist Dave Meltzer gave the match a 5 star rating.

== Production ==
=== Background ===
In December 2020, All Elite Wrestling (AEW) held a television special titled Winter Is Coming, which aired as a special episode of AEW's flagship program, Wednesday Night Dynamite. The episode's title "Winter Is Coming" was derived from Game of Thrones, a television series from HBO, which is part of the WarnerMedia subsidiary of AT&T, which also includes AEW broadcast partner TNT. On the November 19, 2021, episode of Friday Night Rampage, it was announced that a second Winter Is Coming would take place at the Curtis Culwell Center in Garland, Texas as the December 15, 2021, episode of Dynamite on TNT, thus establishing Winter Is Coming as an annual television special for AEW. The December 17 episode of Rampage was also taped that same night following the live broadcast of Winter Is Coming.

=== Storylines ===
Winter Is Coming featured professional wrestling matches that involved different wrestlers from pre-existing scripted feuds and storylines. Wrestlers portrayed heroes, villains, or less distinguishable characters in scripted events that built tension and culminated in a wrestling match or series of matches. Storylines were produced on AEW's weekly television programs, Dynamite and Rampage, the supplementary online streaming shows, Dark and Elevation, and The Young Bucks' YouTube series Being The Elite.

At Full Gear, "Hangman" Adam Page won the AEW World Championship, while also at the event, Bryan Danielson won the AEW World Championship Eliminator Tournament to earn a future match for the title. The championship match was then scheduled for Winter Is Coming. In the weeks leading up to the event, Danielson defeated several of Page's friends in The Dark Order.

On the December 8 episode of Dynamite, the third annual Dynamite Dozen Battle Royal took place in which the cowinners would face each other in the Dynamite Diamond Final for the AEW Dynamite Diamond Ring at Winter Is Coming. The cowinners of the match were MJF and Dante Martin.

== Results ==
| No. | Results | Stipulations | Times |
|---|---|---|---|
| 1 | "Hangman" Adam Page (c) vs. Bryan Danielson ended in a time limit draw | Singles match for the AEW World Championship | 1:00:00 |
| 2 | Wardlow (with Shawn Spears) defeated Matt Sydal by pinfall | Singles match | 1:43 |
| 3 | Hikaru Shida defeated Serena Deeb by pinfall | Singles match | 12:46 |
| 4 | MJF defeated Dante Martin by submission | Dynamite Diamond Final for the AEW Dynamite Diamond Ring | 12:25 |
(c) / – the champion(s) heading into the match
