= Winter Is Coming (2022) =

All Elite Wrestling television special

- Promotion: All Elite Wrestling
- Date: December 14, 2022
- City: Garland, Texas
- Venue: Curtis Culwell Center
- Attendance: 4,978

Winter Is Coming chronology
← Previous; 2021	Next → 2023

AEW Dynamite special episodes chronology
← Previous; Title Tuesday	Next → Holiday Bash

The 2022 Winter Is Coming was the third annual Winter Is Coming professional wrestling television special produced by All Elite Wrestling (AEW). The event took place on December 14, 2022, at the Curtis Culwell Center in Garland, Texas for the second consecutive year. It was broadcast live on TBS as a special episode of AEW's flagship weekly television program, Wednesday Night Dynamite.

== Production ==
=== Background ===
Winter Is Coming is an annual television special held in December by All Elite Wrestling (AEW) since 2020, and airs as a special episode of AEW's flagship program, Wednesday Night Dynamite. The title "Winter Is Coming" is derived from Game of Thrones, a television series from HBO, which is part of Warner Bros. Discovery, which also includes AEW broadcast partners TBS and TNT. On October 12, 2022, it was announced that the third Winter Is Coming would air as the December 14 episode of Dynamite on TBS and would again take place at the Curtis Culwell Center in Garland, Texas for the second consecutive year. The December 16 episode of Friday Night Rampage on TNT was taped the same night following the live broadcast of Winter Is Coming.

=== Storylines ===
Winter Is Coming featured professional wrestling matches that involved different wrestlers from pre-existing scripted feuds and storylines. Wrestlers portrayed heroes, villains, or less distinguishable characters in scripted events that built tension and culminated in a wrestling match or series of matches. Storylines were produced on AEW's weekly television programs, Dynamite and Rampage, the supplementary online streaming shows, Dark and Elevation, and The Young Bucks' YouTube series Being The Elite.

On the November 23 episode of Dynamite, Ricky Starks defeated Ethan Page in the finals of the AEW World Championship Eliminator Tournament to earn a match against MJF for the AEW World Championship at Winter Is Coming. Subsequently on the December 7 episode, the Dynamite Dozen Battle Royal took place. As MJF had won the AEW Dynamite Diamond Ring the last three years, he got a bye in the battle royal with there instead being only one winner who would face MJF for the ring in the Dynamite Diamond Final. Starks would also win the battle royal. It was then announced that the match at Winter Is Coming would be a Winner Takes All match for both the AEW World Championship and the Dynamite Diamond Ring.

At Full Gear, Death Triangle (Pac, Penta El Zero Miedo, and Rey Fénix) defeated The Elite (Kenny Omega, Matt Jackson, and Nick Jackson) to retain the AEW World Trios Championship. Afterwards, it was announced that the Full Gear match was the first in a Best of Seven Series for the championship. Death Triangle would again defeat The Elite on the following episode of Dynamite, but The Elite gained a win on the next week's episode. The fourth match in the series was scheduled for Winter Is Coming.

== Aftermath ==
With Death Triangle's (Pac, Penta El Zero Miedo, and Rey Fénix) win over The Elite (Kenny Omega, Matt Jackson, and Nick Jackson), it brought the series to 3–1, with the fifth match scheduled for Dynamite: Holiday Bash as a No Disqualification match.

While this and the prior two Winter Is Coming events only aired as a special episode of Dynamite, the 2023 event was expanded to a three-part special, also encompassing Friday Night Rampage and Saturday Night Collision, the latter of which premiered as AEW's third weekly television program in June 2023.

== Results ==
No.	Results	Stipulations	Times
1	Death Triangle (Pac, Penta El Zero Miedo, and Rey Fénix) (c) (with Alex Abrahantes) defeated The Elite (Kenny Omega, Matt Jackson, and Nick Jackson) (with Brandon Cutler and Michael Nakazawa) by submission	Six-man tag team match Match four in a Best of Seven Series for the AEW World Trios Championship (Death Triangle leads 3–1)	14:35
2	"Jungle Boy" Jack Perry defeated Brian Cage (with Prince Nana) by pinfall	Singles match	8:20
3	House of Black (Malakai Black, Brody King, and Buddy Matthews) (with Julia Hart) defeated The Factory (QT Marshall, Aaron Solo, and Cole Karter) (with Nick Comoroto and Lee Johnson) by pinfall	Trios match	0:25
4	Action Andretti defeated Chris Jericho by pinfall	Singles match	9:35
5	Ruby Soho defeated Tay Melo by pinfall	Singles match	7:25
6	MJF (c) defeated Ricky Starks by pinfall	Dynamite Diamond Final Winner Takes All match for the AEW World Championship and AEW Dynamite Diamond Ring	15:50
(c) / – the champion(s) heading into the match

=== AEW World Championship Eliminator Tournament ===
Quarterfinals; Dynamite (November 9, 2022); Rampage (November 11 and 18, 2022)
Eddie Kingston	10:19
Ethan Page	Pin
Bandido	Pin
Rush	9:45
Lance Archer	5:24
Ricky Starks	Pin
Brian Cage	Pin
Dante Martin	7:10

Semifinals; Dynamite (November 16, 2022); Full Gear: Zero Hour (November 19, 2022)
Ethan Page	Pin
Bandido	9:05
Ricky Starks	Pin
Brian Cage	10:00

Final; Dynamite (November 23, 2022)
Ethan Page	12:58
Ricky Starks	Pin
