= AEW Dynamite Diamond Ring =

Men's professional wrestling championship ring

- The current AEW Dynamite Diamond Ring (2021–present)
- Founded: 2019
- Founder: Tony Khan
- Organizing body: All Elite Wrestling
- Most recent champion: Bandido (2025)
- Most titles: MJF (6 times)

The AEW Dynamite Diamond Ring is a men's professional wrestling championship ring awarded annually by the American promotion All Elite Wrestling (AEW). Introduced in 2019, it is named after AEW's flagship weekly television program, Dynamite. The ring is awarded to the winner of the Dynamite Diamond Final, a singles match with either one or both participants determined by the Dynamite Diamond Battle Royale, a 12-man over the top rope battle royal. The inaugural winner of the Dynamite Diamond Ring was MJF, who won it for six consecutive years (2019–2024). The 2025 ring winner is Bandido, the first wrestler other than MJF to win it, defeating Ricochet at Dynamite on 34th Street on December 24, 2025 (taped December 20).

From its inception until 2021, the Dynamite Diamond Battle Royale ended when two participants were left in the wrestling ring and those two wrestlers would then face each other in the Dynamite Diamond Final for the championship ring. In 2022, as MJF had been the only ring winner since its inception, he received a bye in the battle royal, which only had one winner who then challenged MJF for the ring; MJF retained and this was again the format in 2023 where he retained again. In 2024, the battle royal returned to having two winners who then faced each other for the right to challenge MJF for the ring, who retained for a final time. For 2025, MJF was excluded with the battle royal returning to its original rules but with the addition that the ring winner would also earn a future AEW World Championship match. The event typically takes place towards the end of the year, with the Dynamite Diamond Battle Royale held as part of Dynamite, with the Dynamite Diamond Final occurring either on the following week's episode or at the next big event, such as a pay-per-view.

== History ==
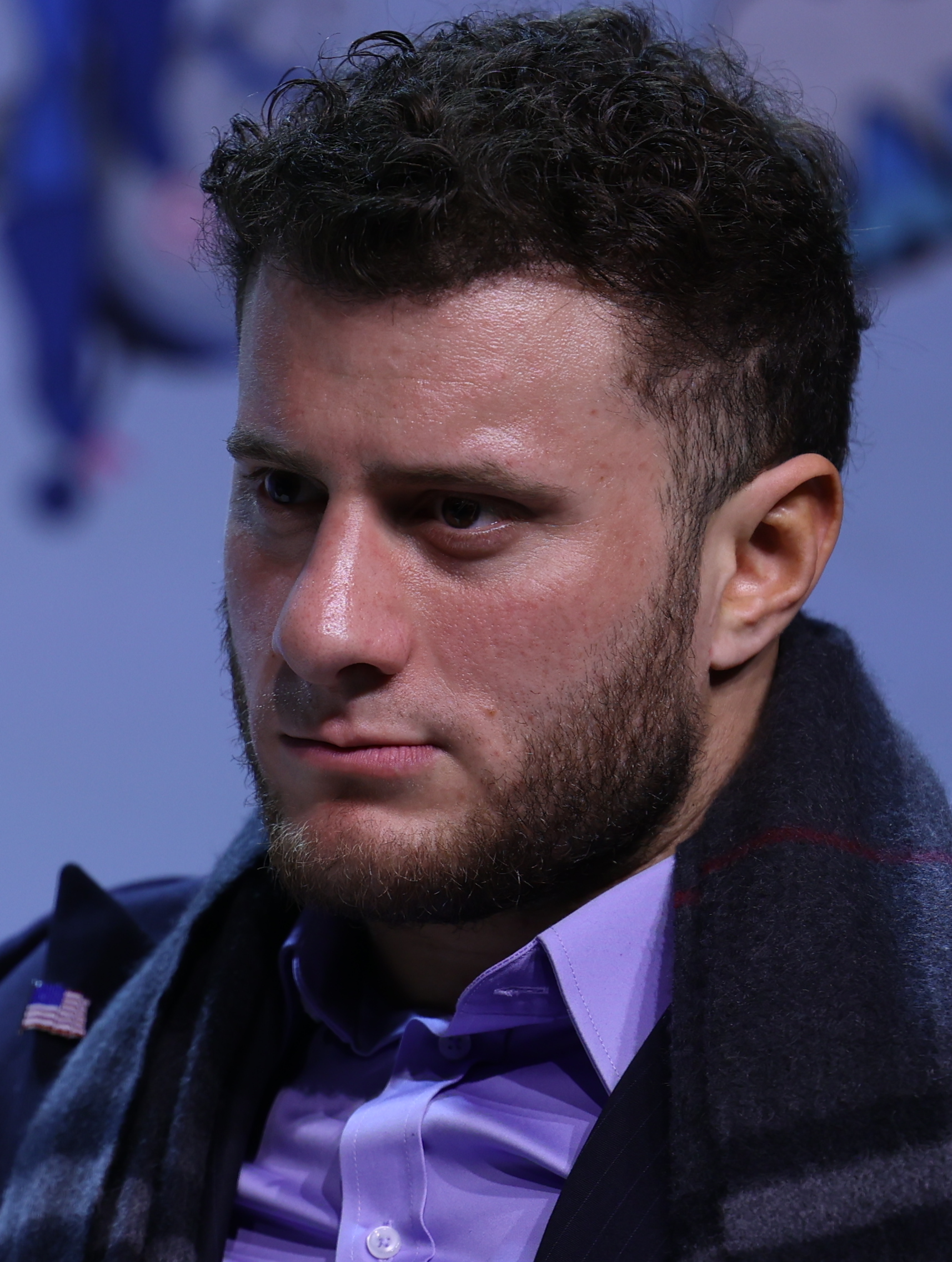
Inaugural and record six-time Dynamite Diamond Ring winner MJF, winning the ring every year from 2019 to 2024; he was excluded in 2025

The American professional wrestling promotion All Elite Wrestling (AEW) was founded in January 2019 and its flagship weekly television program, Dynamite, began airing later that year in October. A month after the program's launch, AEW established the Dynamite Dozen Battle Royal and the Dynamite Diamond Ring for male wrestlers, both taking their respective namesake from the show. The Dynamite Dozen Battle Royal—renamed Dynamite Diamond Battle Royale in 2020—was originally established as a 12-man battle royal that ended when there were two wrestlers remaining in the ring. Those two wrestlers would then face each other the following week in the Dynamite Diamond Final, a singles match for the Dynamite Diamond Ring. The original championship ring was valued at US$42,000. The ring was redesigned in 2021, with a new net worth of US$150,000.

The inaugural battle royal and championship ring final took place in November 2019, and then from 2020 to 2022, they were held in December to coincide with the annual Winter Is Coming television special of Dynamite. The matches then moved up to October in 2023. In 2024, the battle royal returned to coincide with Winter Is Coming, which also had a semi-final, with the final happening at the Worlds End pay-per-view event at the end of the month, while in 2025, the battle royal and final coincided with December's Holiday Bash and Dynamite on 34th Street specials, respectively.

The inaugural winner of the Dynamite Diamond Ring was MJF, who was presented the ring by wrestling veteran Diamond Dallas Page. MJF won the ring a record six times, winning it every year since its inception from 2019 until 2024—from 2022 to 2024, he received a bye in the battle royal and instead defended the ring against the battle royal winner. In 2025, MJF was excluded, with Bandido becoming only the second wrestler to win the ring.

== Dynamite Diamond Battle Royale ==
In a standard battle royal, all participants begin in the wrestling ring and the objective is to eliminate all other opponents by throwing them over the top rope with both feet touching the ground floor and the winner is the last wrestler remaining. As of December 2025, the rules of the Dynamite Diamond Battle Royale are that 12 wrestlers compete in a standard battle royal, but it ends when there are two wrestlers remaining. The co-winners then face each other in the Dynamite Diamond Final for the AEW Dynamite Diamond Ring and a future AEW World Championship match. As the Dynamite Diamond Ring is not like a standard professional wrestling championship, the winner of the championship ring holds it until the following year's battle royal.

=== Early matches (2019–2021) ===
The inaugural match, originally called the Dynamite Dozen Battle Royal, was held on the November 20, 2019, episode of Dynamite, where Adam Page and MJF were the cowinners. MJF then defeated Page in the Dynamite Diamond Final on the following week's episode of Dynamite to win the inaugural AEW Dynamite Diamond Ring.

The second annual battle royal, which renamed it as the Dynamite Diamond Battle Royale, occurred at the inaugural Winter Is Coming special of Dynamite on December 2, 2020. MJF and Orange Cassidy were the co-winners. They faced each other on the following week's episode of Dynamite, where MJF defeated Cassidy to win the AEW Dynamite Diamond Ring for the second time.

The third annual battle royal occurred on the December 8, 2021, episode of Dynamite, with MJF and Dante Martin cowinning. The Dynamite Diamond Final took place at the second annual Winter Is Coming special of Dynamite the following week, where MJF won the ring for a third time.

=== MJF's championship ring defenses (2022–2024) ===
The fourth annual battle royal took place on the December 7, 2022, episode of Dynamite, but with a slight change over the previous three iterations. Due to MJF being the only winner of the AEW Dynamite Diamond Ring, he was given a bye in the battle royal with there instead only being one winner for the 2022 Dynamite Diamond Battle Royale who would go on to face MJF for the ring in the Dynamite Diamond Final at the third annual Winter Is Coming special of Dynamite the following week. Ricky Starks won the battle royal. Prior to the battle royal, Starks had also won a tournament to become the number one contender for the AEW World Championship, also held by MJF. It was in turn decided that at Winter Is Coming, MJF would defend both the AEW World Championship and the AEW Dynamite Diamond Ring against Starks in a Winner Takes All match. MJF defeated Starks to retain both the championship and ring.

The fifth annual battle royal was moved up to the October 18, 2023, episode of Dynamite. Like the previous year, there was only one winner of the battle royal, who then faced reigning ring holder MJF for the Dynamite Diamond Ring on the following week's Dynamite. Juice Robinson won the battle royal, but MJF subsequently defeated Robinson to retain the Dynamite Diamond Ring for the fifth consecutive year.

The sixth annual battle royal was held on the December 4, 2024, episode of Dynamite. Like the first three iterations, there were two winners of the battle royal, but unlike those first three, the co-winners faced each other in a semi-final to advance to the final to challenge MJF for the ring. Adam Cole and Kyle O'Reilly co-won the battle royal and were scheduled to face each other at the fifth annual Winter Is Coming special of Dynamite the following week with the winner of that match facing MJF for the Dynamite Diamond Ring at the Worlds End pay-per-view event on December 28. Cole defeated O'Reilly to face MJF for the ring at Worlds End, where MJF won the ring for the sixth consecutive year. This also marked the first time that the Dynamite Diamond Final was not held on an episode of Dynamite.

=== AEW World Championship opportunity (2025–present) ===
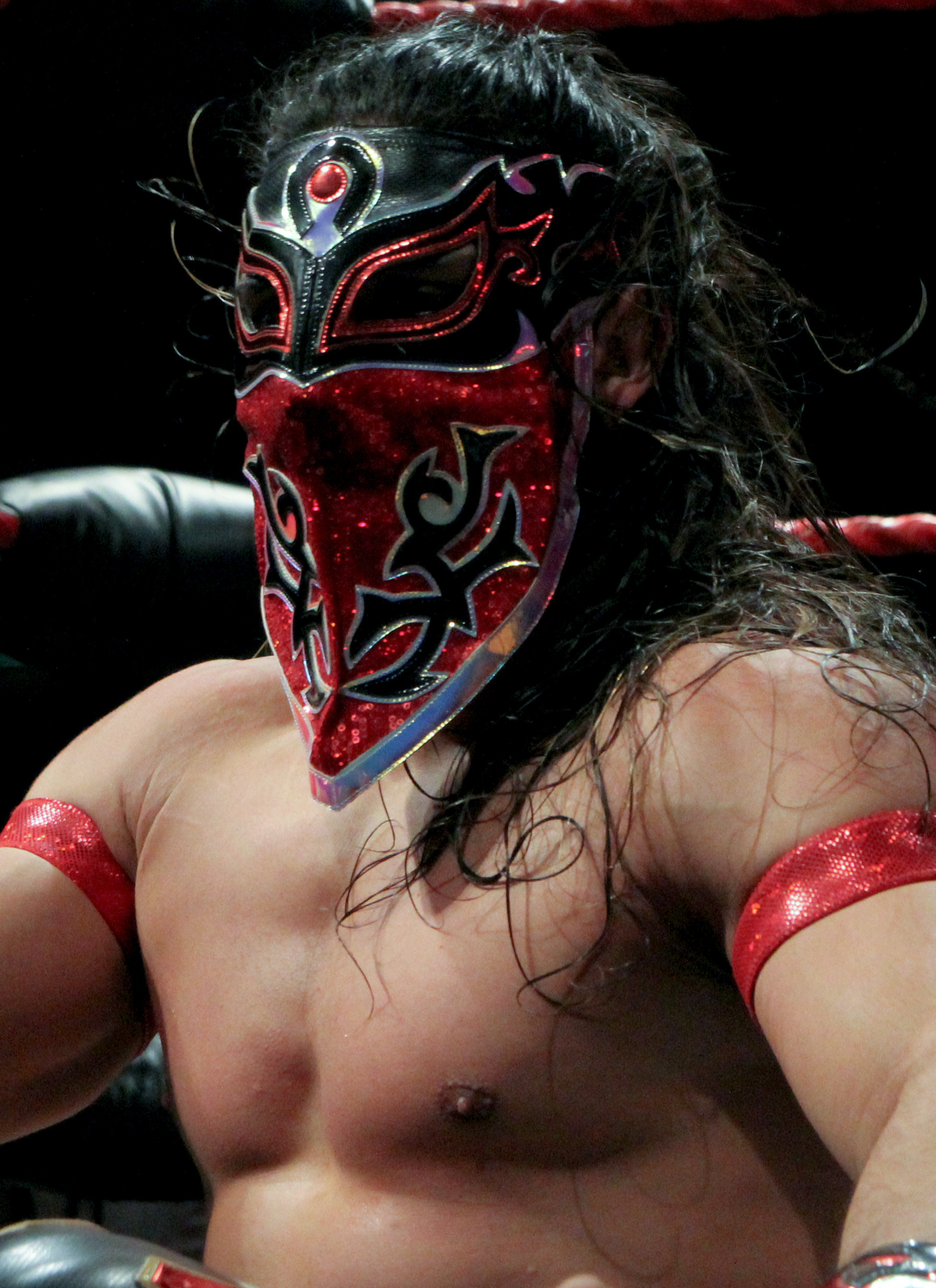
2025 Dynamite Diamond Ring winner Bandido, the second wrestler to win the ring since its inception in 2019.

The seventh annual battle royal took place at the sixth annual Holiday Bash episode of Dynamite on December 17, 2025. It was co-won by Ricochet and Bandido. Unlike prior years where reigning ring holder MJF would defend the ring in the Dynamite Diamond Final, MJF was excluded from the event altogether for unexplained reasons—he had been on hiatus since September and upon his surprise return on December 17, he cashed in his Casino Gauntlet match contract for an AEW World Championship match that was scheduled for the Worlds End pay-per-view the following week, but with no acknowledgement of the ring. Instead, Ricochet and Bandido faced each other in the Dynamite Diamond Final the following week at the Dynamite on 34th Street special episode (taped December 20, aired December 24), and it was also decided that the ring winner would get an AEW World Championship match at the Dynamite: Maximum Carnage special on January 14, 2026. The 2025 Dynamite Diamond Ring winner was Bandido, becoming only the second wrestler to win the ring since its inception in 2019. MJF won the AEW World Championship at Worlds End, in turn becoming the defending champion against the ring winner Bandido at Maximum Carnage, where MJF retained the AEW World Championship.

== Championship ring designs ==
The original AEW Dynamite Diamond Ring's dark silver design (2019–2020)

The design from 2019 to 2020, crafted by Jason of Beverly Hills, featured a square face with a dark silver finish. The center displayed the AEW logo, encrusted with white diamonds. Surrounding the logo were horizontal diamond-covered bars. The words "DYNAMITE" and "DIAMOND" were engraved in silver lettering on the top and bottom edges of the square. The bezel was lined with a full border of round-cut diamonds, continuing partway down the thick, angular band. The sides of the ring also included diamond detailing, enhancing its bold and luxurious appearance.

The current design introduced in 2021, also designed by Jason of Beverly Hills, features a large square golden face densely set with small diamonds, framed by polished silver edges with sharp, clean lines. Around the perimeter of the face, the words "DYNAMITE" and "DIAMOND" are engraved in bold capital letters. The band is thick and sturdy, also polished silver, with angular engravings on each side.

== Dynamite Diamond Ring winners ==
Year	Winner	Runner-up	Finals match	
Year	Winner	Runner-up	Date and event	Location
2019	MJF	"Hangman" Adam Page	November 27, 2019; Thanksgiving Eve Dynamite	Hoffman Estates, Illinois
2020	MJF	Orange Cassidy	December 9, 2020; Dynamite	Jacksonville, Florida
2021	MJF	Dante Martin	December 15, 2021; Dynamite: Winter is Coming	Garland, Texas
2022 (Note: This was a Winner Takes All match for both MJF's AEW World Championship and Dynamite Diamond Ring.)	MJF	Ricky Starks	December 14, 2022; Dynamite: Winter is Coming	Garland, Texas
2023	MJF	Juice Robinson	October 25, 2023; Dynamite	Philadelphia, Pennsylvania
2024	MJF	Adam Cole (Note: Kyle O'Reilly was the co-winner of the 2024 Dynamite Dozen Battle Royal.)	December 28, 2024; Worlds End	Orlando, Florida
2025	Bandido	Ricochet	December 20, 2025 (aired December 24); Dynamite on 34th Street	New York City, New York

== See also ==
- List of current champions in All Elite Wrestling
- Battle royal (professional wrestling)
