= Curtis Culwell Center =

Multi-purpose indoor arena and conference center in Garland, Texas, U.S.

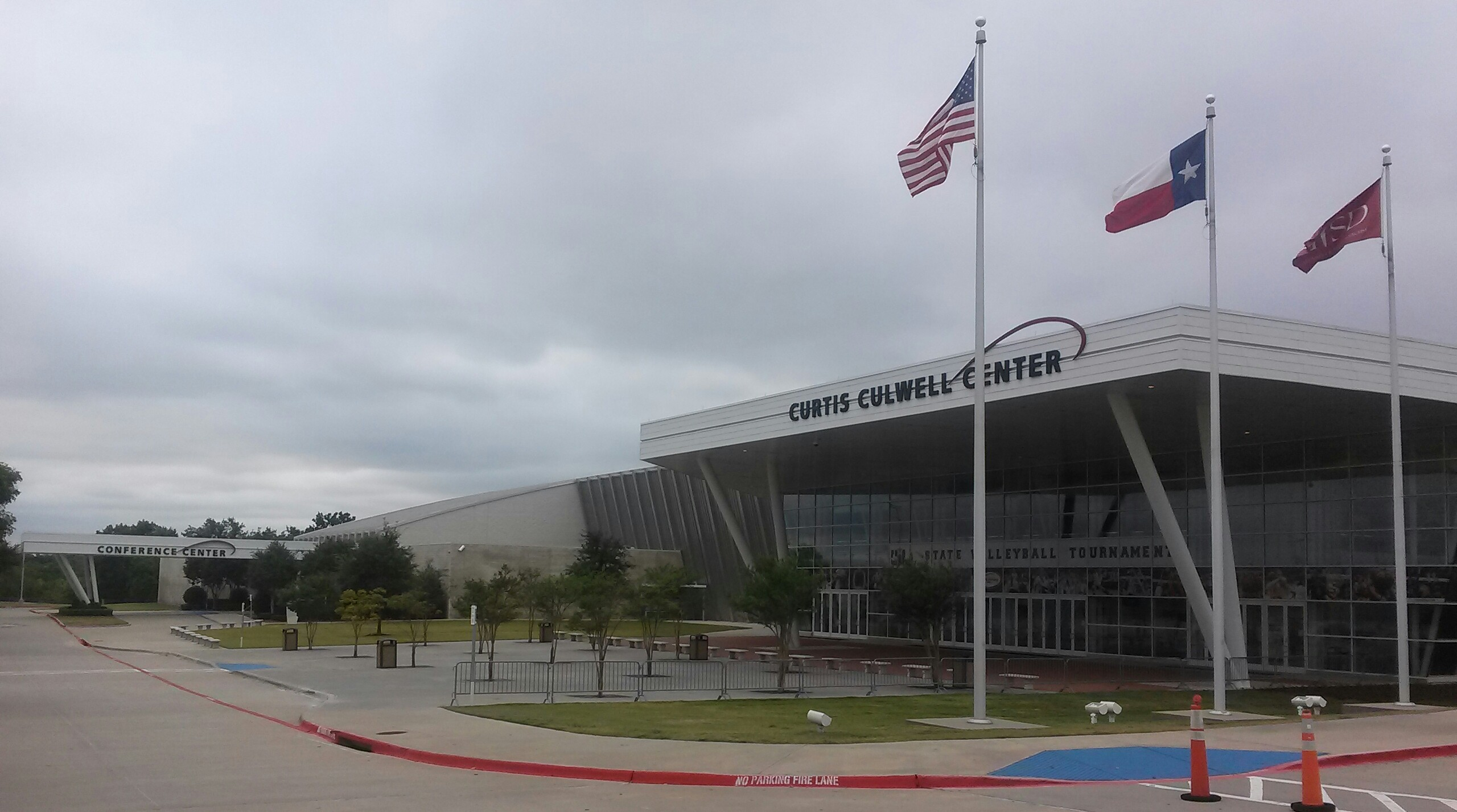
- Interactive map of Curtis Culwell Center
- Former names: Garland Special Events Center
- Address: 4999 Naaman Forest Blvd.
- Location: Garland, Texas, U.S.
- Coordinates: 32.95956°N 96.64191°W
- Owner: Garland Independent School District
- Capacity: 8,500 (standing capacity); 6,860 (seating capacity)

Construction
- Opened: August 2005
- Cost: $31,500,000
- Architect: HKS, Inc.

Tenants
- Garland Independent School District (2005-present); Dallas Darlings (WAFL) (2012); SMU Mustangs (NCAA) (2013)

Website
- curtisculwellcenter.com

The Curtis Culwell Center (formerly the Garland Special Events Center) is a 6,860-fixed seat arena (8,500 full capacity) and conference center in Garland, Texas. It opened in 2005 and was designed by HKS, Inc. and constructed at a cost of $31.5 million by Lee Lewis Construction with engineering by Walter P. Moore, Blum Consulting Engineers, and RLK Engineers Inc. The arena is the property of the Garland Independent School District (GISD).

== Notable Events ==
=== Attack ===
On May 3, 2015, two men carried out an attack during an art exhibition featuring works depicting Muhammad. Both men were killed at the scene. One Garland ISD officer was wounded in the exchange of gunfire.

=== Athletic Events ===
It is used by the men's basketball teams of the GISD. It was also used as a venue by the SMU Mustangs men's and women's basketball teams while the Moody Coliseum was being renovated. It also hosts the UIL state girls' volleyball championships.

=== Professional wrestling ===
The arena has hosted multiple events from the professional wrestling promotion All Elite Wrestling (AEW), its sister promotion Ring of Honor (ROH), New Japan Pro-Wrestling (NJPW), and Total Nonstop Action Wrestling (TNA). These include:

- The December 11, 2019 episode of AEW Dynamite,
- The Dynamite special episodes Fyter Fest and Winter Is Coming (both 2021). The latter event also included tapings for that week's episode of AEW Rampage.
- From June 25 to June 26, 2021, the area hosted New Japan Pro-Wrestling's Autumn Attack which aired as special episodes of NJPW STRONG.
- Supercard of Honor XV on April 1, 2022 for AEW's sister promotion Ring of Honor (ROH), the first card since the reboot of the company under the ownership of AEW co-owner/executive Tony Khan.
- On April 15, 2022, the Center hosted AEW's Battle of the Belts II.
- On December 14, 2022, Winter is Coming returned for the second consecutive year.
- The Center hosted ROH's Final Battle pay-per-view on December 15, 2023, followed by the third night of the Winter is Coming special on December 16 (the latter event, spanning two days, was co-hosted by both the Center and College Park Center on the University of Texas at Arlington campus; College Park hosted the live Dynamite show and the taped Rampage show on December 13).
- On November 10, 2023, the arena hosted NJPW's Lone Star Shootout pay-per-view.
- Total Nonstop Action Wrestling held its Genesis pay-per-view at the arena on January 19, 2025.
