= Ricky Starks =

American professional wrestler (born 1990)

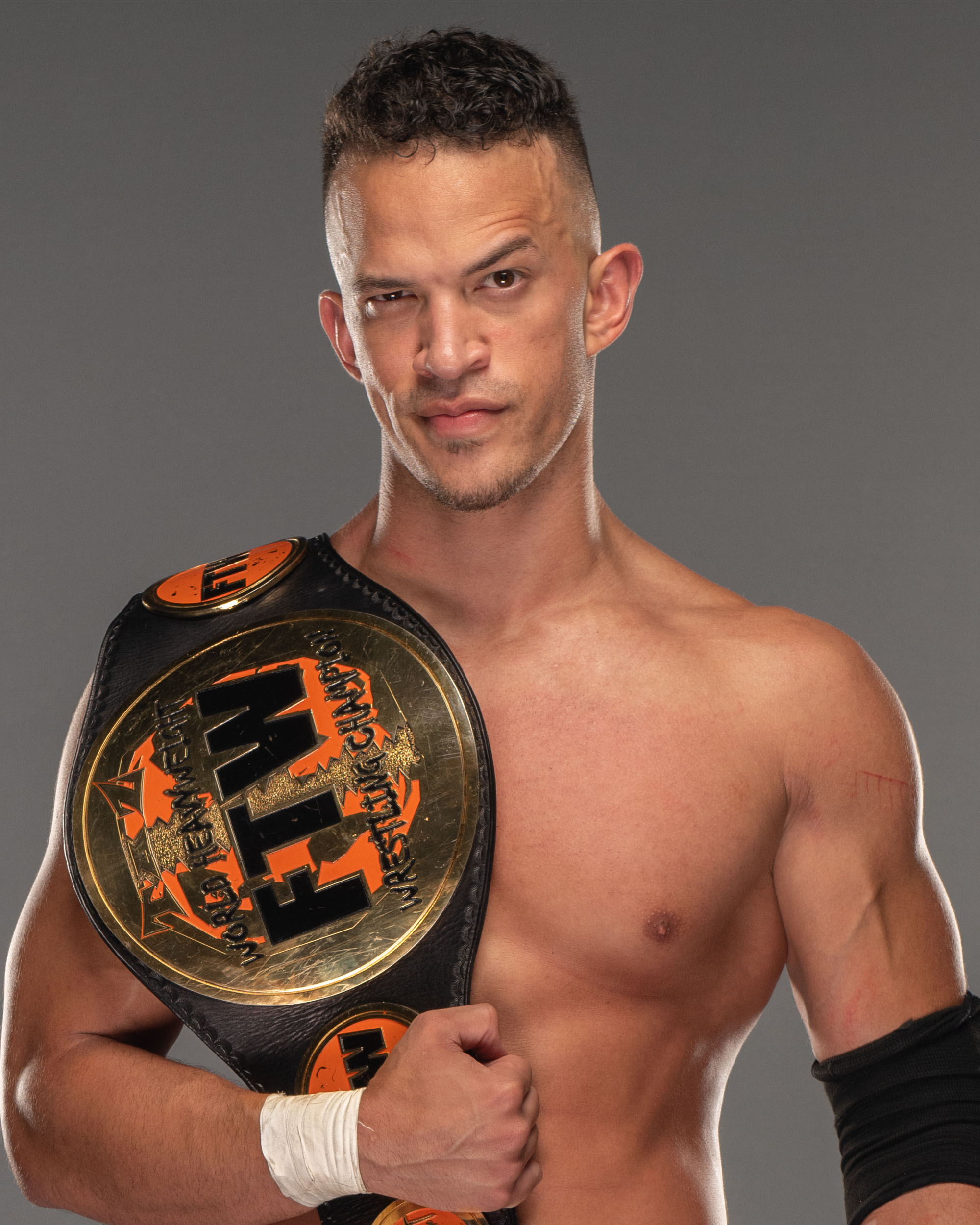
- Starks in 2021

Personal information
- Born: Richard Starks; February 21, 1990 (age 36) New Orleans, Louisiana, U.S.

Professional wrestling career
- Ring name(s): Ricky Saints; Ricky Starks
- Billed height: 6 ft 0 in (183 cm)
- Billed weight: 205 lb (93 kg)
- Billed from: New Orleans, Louisiana
- Trained by: Mr. Mexico II
- Debut: 2012

Richard Starks (born February 21, 1990) is an American professional wrestler. As of February 2025, he is signed to WWE, where he performs on the SmackDown brand under the ring name Ricky Saints.

Starks began his career as Ricky Starks in 2012 and worked on several independent promotions. In 2018, he began to work with National Wrestling Alliance (NWA), where he was the inaugural holder of the revived NWA World Television Championship. In 2020, he left NWA and signed with All Elite Wrestling (AEW). With AEW, Starks became part of Team Taz, where he won the FTW Championship. After leaving the stable, he won the 2023 Owen Hart Cup and the AEW World Tag Team Championship once. He left AEW in 2025 and signed with WWE soon after, being assigned to NXT under the name Ricky Saints, where he won the NXT North American Championship and the NXT Championship.

== Early life ==
Starks was born on February 21, 1990 in New Orleans, Louisana and was raised by a single mother with two siblings. At age 15, he and his family moved to Las Vegas, then Austin, Texas after Hurricane Katrina completely destroyed his childhood home.

== Professional wrestling career ==
=== Early career (2012–2018) ===
Starks idolized wrestlers including The Undertaker, The Rock, and Mankind, among many others, while growing up watching professional wrestling. Around the age of seventeen, Starks decided he would pursue his dream of becoming a professional wrestler. Before signing with WWE, Starks worked four matches for the promotion as an enhancement talent, losing against wrestlers like Jinder Mahal, Enzo Amore and Colin Cassady, Kane and The Revival (Scott Dawson and Dash Wilder), before debuting for the National Wrestling Alliance's (NWA) Velocity Pro Wrestling on October 14, 2012 at the NWA Velocity Haunted Havoc event in Austin, Texas. There, he wrestled in a triple threat match against Jaykus Plisken and Big Ricky. Since 2012, Starks became a regular talent featured across numerous promotions in the state of Texas, like Anarchy Championship Wrestling and Inspire Pro Wrestling. He appeared in a WWE backstage video on the July 29, 2013 episode of Raw, where he was bullied, mocked, and slammed through a table by Ryback. Starks again made an appearance on the March 19, 2018 episode of Raw as a US Marshal, arresting Roman Reigns, only for Starks to be attacked by Reigns.

=== National Wrestling Alliance (2018–2020) ===
Starks made his debut for National Wrestling Alliance (NWA) at the NWA 70th Anniversary Show on October 21, 2018, competing in a four-way elimination match against Jay Bradley, Mike Parrow and Willie Mack, which Mack won. He returned on the October 15, 2019 episode of Power, defeating Trevor Murdoch. At Into the Fire on December 14, Starks competed in a three-way match against Aron Stevens and NWA National Champion Colt Cabana for the title, where Stevens won. Soon after, Starks entered the tournament to crown the inaugural champion of the revived NWA World Television Championship at Hard Times on January 24, 2020, where he defeated Eddie Kingston in the first round, Matt Cross in the second round, Tim Storm in the semi-finals and Trevor Murdoch in the finals to become the new NWA World Television Champion. Starks lost the title two days later to Zicky Dice, which was aired on the March 3 episode of Powerrr due to tape delay. On May 18, it was announced that Starks was no longer with the NWA as his contract had expired.

=== All Elite Wrestling (2020–2025) ===
==== Team Taz (2020–2022) ====
On the June 17, 2020 episode of AEW Dynamite, Starks made his unannounced debut for All Elite Wrestling (AEW) where he answered Cody's open challenge for the AEW TNT Championship in a losing effort. After the match, AEW CEO Tony Khan announced that Starks had signed with the promotion. On the June 30 episode of Dark, Starks picked up his first victory in AEW by defeating Griff Garrison while quickly establishing himself as a heel. On the July 21 episode of Dark, after defeating Will Hobbs, Starks aided Brian Cage in attacking Robert Anthony and Darby Allin after their match, creating an alliance between the two. The team, managed by Taz and now known as Team Taz, began feuding with Allin as they faced Allin and Jon Moxley on the July 29 episode of Dynamite where they were defeated. At the All Out pay-per-view on September 5, Starks participated in the Casino Battle Royale, but he was eliminated by Allin. On the November 18 episode of Dynamite, Will Hobbs would join Starks, Taz, and Cage's alliance after he struck Cody with Cage's FTW Championship belt and then assisted them in attacking both Allin and Cody as well. On the December 2 episode of Dynamite: Winter Is Coming, Starks and Hobbs, the latter now known as Powerhouse Hobbs, would lose a tag team match to Cody and Allin, after which, Sting made his AEW debut and ran Team Taz off after a post-match attack. On the January 20 episode of Dynamite, it was announced that Starks and Brian Cage would be facing Allin and Sting in a street fight at Revolution, a cinematic match that Starks and Cage ultimately lost. On July 14, 2021, on night one of Fyter Fest, Starks won the FTW World Championship from Brian Cage, winning his first championship in AEW, although the FTW title is not an officially sanctioned championship in the company. On an episode of Rampage, Starks defeated Cage in a Philly street fight. Starks would qualify for the "Face of the Revolution" ladder match by defeating Preston "10" Vance, but would fail to win the match at Revolution. In September 2021, in addition to still being a wrestler on the show, Starks joined the Rampage commentary team, replacing Mark Henry.

On the July 20, 2022 episode of Dynamite, Starks issued an open challenge for his FTW Championship, where he defeated Cole Karter. After the match, he issued another open challenge for the following week's Dynamite, which was answered by Danhausen. At Fight for the Fallen on July 27, 2022, Starks issued an open challenge immediately after defeating Danhausen. It was answered by Team Taz teammate Hook, who defeated him for the title, ending Starks's reign at 378 days, making him the longest-reigning FTW Champion at the time. After a impassioned post-match promo by Starks, Powerhouse Hobbs attacked him, turning Starks face. The following week, Taz, while on commentary, announced that he had dissolved Team Taz. Starks came out to confront Hobbs on the August 3 episode of Dynamite only for his former partner to attack him and leave the ring. The grudge match between Hobbs and Starks was set for All Out, where Hobbs defeated Starks in just over five minutes. Starks and Hobbs faced off once more at Grand Slam in an Unsanctioned Lights Out match, where Starks defeated Hobbs, ending the feud.

==== Championship pursuits and departure (2022–2025) ====
On the Thanksgiving Eve special episode of Dynamite on November 23, Starks defeated Ethan Page in the finals of an AEW World Championship Eliminator Tournament to face AEW World Champion Maxwell Jacob Friedman at Dynamite: Winter Is Coming for the title. Two weeks later, on the December 7 edition of Dynamite, Starks competed in the Dynamite Dozen Battle Royale, last eliminating Ethan Page to add the Dynamite Diamond Ring as a second prize to his AEW World Championship match. The following week on Dynamite, Starks and Friedman faced off in a heated promo, with Starks insulting Friedman's cheap tactics of gaining acclaim, compared to the hard work Starks put in, resulting in Friedman hitting Starks with a low blow, only for Starks to retaliate with a spear, knocking Friedman down. At Winter is Coming, MJF defeated Starks to retain the AEW World Championship and winning Starks' Dynamite Diamond Ring.

Following this loss, Starks entered a feud with Chris Jericho, who attempted to recruit Starks into his Jericho Appreciation Society (JAS) group on the December 22 edition of Dynamite, but failed as Starks declined, insulting Jericho and JAS members Sammy Guevara and Daniel Garcia in the process. This led to JAS member Jake Hager attacking Starks along with the remainder of the group until Starks was saved by Action Andretti, who was also feuding with the JAS. Two weeks later on the January 4 edition of Dynamite, Starks defeated Jericho in a singles match, although he and Andretti were attacked by the JAS post-match, including Hager powerbombing Starks through a table. Starks avenged the attack, defeating Hager on the January 18 edition of Dynamite. On February 8, Starks faced the JAS in a Gauntlet match, defeating Matt Menard and Angelo Parker but lost to Daniel Garcia. Starks and Jericho's feud culminated at Revolution, where Starks once again defeated Jericho.

Starks then began a feud with Juice Robinson, who attacked Starks on the March 8 edition of Dynamite. The two men were set to face off on the April 5 edition of Dynamite, though before the match former Bullet Club leader Jay White made his debut after signing with AEW, attacking Starks alongside Robinson, causing a no-contest. Starks competed in the Owen Hart Foundation Men's Tournament, defeating Robinson and Powerhouse Hobbs to advance to the tournament finals. On the July 15 episode of Collision, he defeated CM Punk in the finals to win the men's tournament. On the August 5 episode of Collision, Starks unsuccessfully challenged Punk for the "Real World Championship", with Ricky "the Dragon" Steamboat serving as the special outside enforcer due to Starks cheating to defeat Punk in their previous two matches. After the match, Starks assaulted Steamboat with Steamboat's own belt, thus turning heel. As a result of his actions against Steamboat, AEW (kayfabe) suspended Starks from wrestling for 28 days. However, Starks acquired a manager's license in order to continue appearing in AEW and started managing Big Bill. On the September 2 episode of Collision, Starks issued a challenge to Steamboat and signed a match contract to strap match at All Out against "The Dragon". "The American Dragon" Bryan Danielson then came out to sign the match contract instead of Steamboat. At All Out, Starks lost to Danielson by technical submission after passing out from Danielson's modified submission using the strap.

On the October 7 episode of Collision, Starks and Big Cass won their first AEW championship by defeating FTR (Cash Wheeler and Dax Harwood) to become the new AEW World Tag Team Champions. Starks and Big Bill lost the titles to Sting and Darby Allin in a tornado tag team match on the February 7, 2024 episode of Dynamite, ending their reign at 123 days. On the March 30 episode of Collision, Starks and Big Bill were defeated by Top Flight (Dante Martin and Darius Martin) in what would be Starks' final AEW match. In February 2025, Starks' profile was removed from AEW's website and he was subsequently released, ending his five-year tenure with the company.

=== Independent circuit (2024–2025) ===
On November 23, 2024, Starks debuted in Game Changer Wrestling (GCW) at GCW Dream On, where he cut a promo stating that "I'd I will be damned if I sit at home and let my career dwindle", in reference to his absence from AEW. Later that night, GCW announced that Starks would face Matt Cardona at GCW Highest in the Room on December 14. Several days later, GCW announced that Starks had been pulled from all upcoming appearances. On December 29, Starks appeared in DEFY Wrestling at DEFY Blueprint to challenge DEFY World Champion Kenta for the title at DEFY Hundredth on February 7, 2025, where he went on to defeat Kenta for the title. On January 17, Starks made his debut for House of Glory (HOG) at HOG Watch The Throne, where he unsuccessfully challenged Mike Santana for the HOG Heavyweight Championship. On February 28, Starks relinquished the DEFY World Championship after signing with WWE, ending his reign at 21 days.

=== WWE (2025–present) ===
==== NXT (2025–2026) ====
Starks made his WWE debut on the February 11, 2025 episode of NXT as a face, adopting the ring name Ricky Saints soon after. Saints made his in-ring debut on the February 25 episode of NXT, where he teamed with Je'Von Evans to defeat Ethan Page and Wes Lee in a tag team match. On the April 1 episode of NXT, Saints defeated Shawn Spears to win the NXT North American Championship. During his celebration, Saints was attacked by Page to start a feud for the title. At NXT Stand & Deliver on April 19, Saints successfully defended the title against Page. On the May 27 episode of NXT, Saints lost the title to Page in a rematch, ending his reign at 56 days and suffering a laryngeal contusion. On July 12 at NXT The Great American Bash, Saints failed to regain the title from Page in a Falls Count Anywhere match.

At No Mercy on September 27, Saints defeated Oba Femi to win the NXT Championship, but lost it back to Femi at Deadline on December 6, ending his reign at 70 days. Three days later on the following episode of NXT, Saints turned heel after costing Je'Von Evans his NXT Championship match against Femi. On February 3 episode of NXT, Starks failed to win the title in a ladder match which was won by Joe Hendry. At NXT Vengeance Day on March 7, Saints failed to win the title from Hendry. At NXT Stand & Deliver on April 4, Saints failed to win once again after it was won by Tony D'Angelo. Saints wrestled his final match in NXT on the April 28 episode of NXT, where he lost to Shiloh Hill.

==== SmackDown (2026–present) ====
On April 24, 2026 episode of SmackDown, a vignette aired teasing Saints' arrival to the SmackDown brand for the following week, marking his official call up to the main roster. The following week, Saints made his SmackDown debut, confronting the Undisputed WWE Champion Cody Rhodes and was defeated by Rhodes in his debut match on the main roster. He got his first main roster win the following week against Matt Cardona. He challenged Trick Williams for the United States Championship at Night of Champions in a losing effort.

== Professional wrestling style and persona ==
A highlight reel of a match between Starks and Charles Mason in House of Glory in January 2025. Starks (trunks) can be seen using a leaping spear as well an Inverted powerbomb (called the Rochambeau) to win the match.

Starks has referred to his style as a "pastiche" of other wrestlers, most notably The Undertaker's selling and Shinjiro Otani. Dan Allanson of Pro Wrestling Torch agrees, describing Starks' in-ring style as a mix of the Undertaker and Bret Hart, while his persona is a throwback to self-confident Attitude Era stars such as The Rock and Stone Cold Steve Austin.

Starks uses an Inverted powerbomb dubbed the "Rochambeau" as a finishing manoeuvre. Other finishers include a lifting sitout double underhook facebuster called The Buster Keaton/Arms of Orion and a leaping spear.

== Personal life ==
Starks has spoken on a number of occasions about his frustrations that people often do not realize he is African-American (Starks has described himself as "light-skinned"), something that was a source of bullying and fights in his childhood.

== Other media ==
=== Film ===
Year	Title	Role	Notes
2020	A Grievance with Gravity	Randy	Short film

=== Television ===
Year	Title	Role	Notes
2021	Rhodes to the Top	Himself	Episode: "Off the Rails"
2026	Wild Cards	Atlas	Episode: "Dead Weight"

=== Video games ===
Trick Williams in video games
Year	Title	Ref.	Notes
2023	AEW Fight Forever		Video game debut
2026	WWE 2K26		

== Championships and accomplishments ==
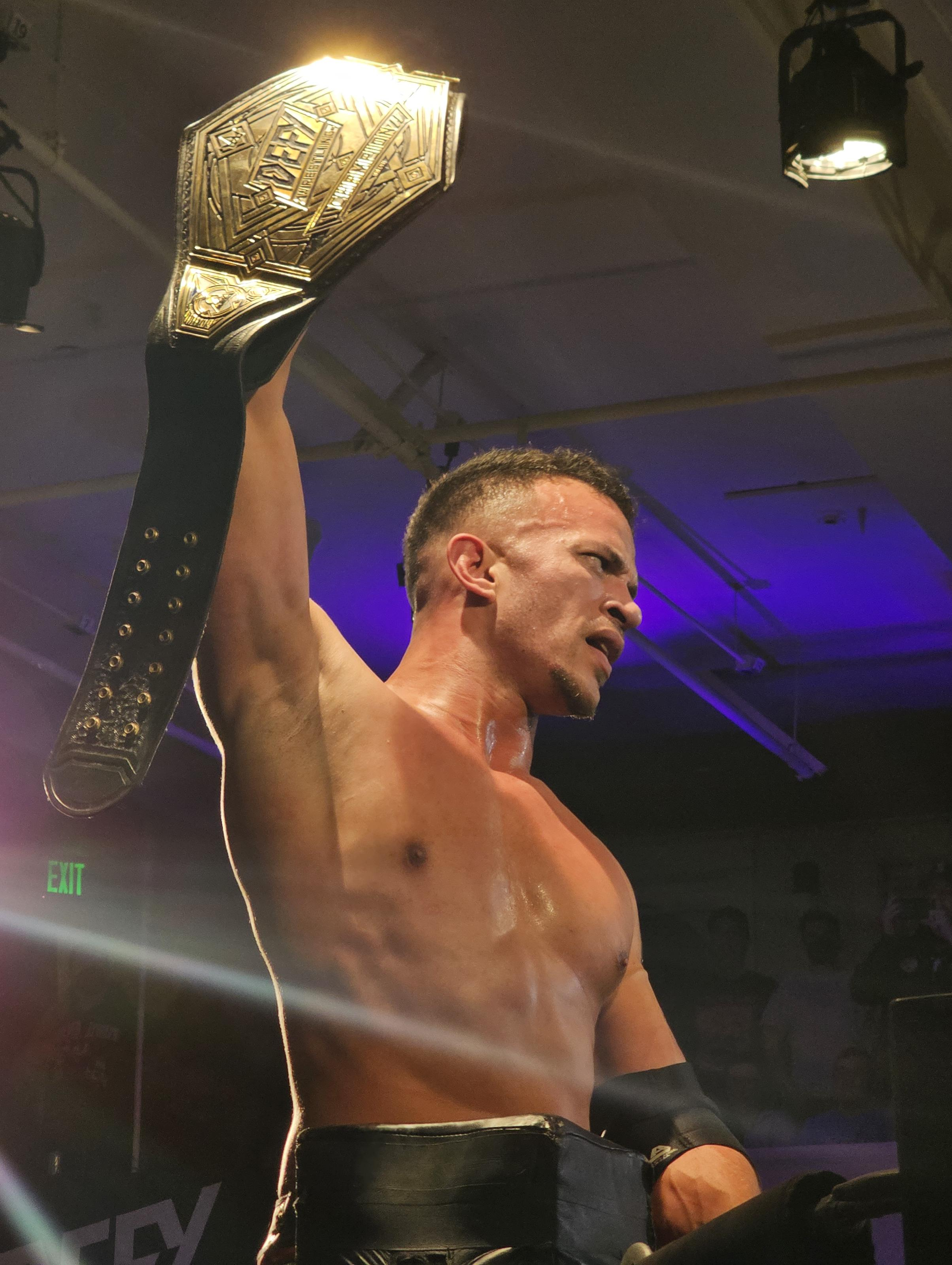
Starks as DEFY World Champion in February 2025.

- All Elite Wrestling
  - AEW World Tag Team Championship (1 time) – with Big Bill
  - FTW Championship (1 time)
  - AEW World Championship Eliminator Tournament (2022)
  - Dynamite Diamond Battle Royale (2022)
  - Men’s Owen Hart Cup (2023)
- Anarchy Championship Wrestling
  - ACW Hardcore Championship (1 time)
  - ACW Televised Championship (1 time)
  - ACW Unified Championship (1 time)
- DEFY Wrestling
  - DEFY World Championship (1 time)
- Dojo Pro Wrestling
  - Dojo Pro White Belt Championship (1 time)
- ESPN
  - Breakthrough Wrestler of the Year (2022)
- Imperial Wrestling Revolution
  - IWR Revolutionary Championship (1 time)
- Inspire Pro Wrestling
  - Inspire Pro Championship (1 time)
  - Inspire Pro Junior Crown Championship (1 time)
  - Inspire Pro Pure Prestige Championship (1 time)
- National Wrestling Alliance
  - NWA World Television Championship (1 time, inaugural)
  - NWA World Television Championship Tournament (2020)
- NWA Houston
  - NWA Lone Star Junior Heavyweight Championship (1 time)
- Pro Wrestling Illustrated
  - Ranked No. 39 of the top 500 singles wrestlers in the PWI 500 in 2025
- VIP Wrestling
  - VIP Tag Team Championship (1 time) – with Carson
  - VIP Tag Team Championship Tournament (2015) – with Carson
- WrestleCircus
  - WC Big Top Tag Team Championships (1 time) – with Aaron Solow
- WWE
  - NXT Championship (1 time)
  - NXT North American Championship (1 time)
- Xtreme Championship Wrestling
  - XCW Heavyweight Championship (1 time, final)
