= Holiday Bash (2023) =

All Elite Wrestling three-part television special

- Promotional poster for the Dynamite broadcast
- Promotion: All Elite Wrestling
- Date: December 20 and 23, 2023 (aired December 20, 22, and 23, 2023)
- City: Oklahoma City, Oklahoma (Dec. 20); San Antonio, Texas (Dec. 23)
- Venue: Paycom Center (Oklahoma City); Frost Bank Center (San Antonio)
- Attendance: Night 1: 4,631; Night 2: 4,631; Night 3: 4,874

Holiday Bash chronology
← Previous; 2022	Next → 2024

AEW Dynamite special episodes chronology
← Previous; Winter Is Coming	Next → New Year's Smash

AEW Rampage special episodes chronology
← Previous; Winter Is Coming	Next → New Year's Smash

AEW Collision special episodes chronology
← Previous; Winter Is Coming	Next → Collision's 1 Year Anniversary

The 2023 Holiday Bash was the fourth annual Holiday Bash professional wrestling Christmas television special produced by All Elite Wrestling (AEW). It took place on December 20 and 23, 2023. While the prior two events were two-part events, airing as special episodes of Wednesday Night Dynamite and Friday Night Rampage, the 2023 event expanded Holiday Bash to a three-part special, also encompassing Saturday Night Collision. Dynamite aired live on December 20 on TBS and was held at the Paycom Center in Oklahoma City, Oklahoma, while Rampage was taped that same night and aired on tape delay on December 22 on TNT. Collision aired live on December 23 on TNT and was held at the Frost Bank Center in San Antonio, Texas.

A total of 15 matches were contested across the three broadcasts; five aired live on Dynamite with four taped for Rampage, and then six aired live on Collision. In the main event of the Dynamite broadcast, Jay White defeated Jon Moxley in a Gold League match of the Continental Classic tournament. In the main event of the Rampage broadcast, El Hijo del Vikingo defeated Black Taurus to retain the AAA Mega Championship of the Mexican promotion Lucha Libre AAA Worldwide. In the main event of the Collision broadcast, Eddie Kingston defeated Andrade El Idolo in a Blue League match of the Continental Classic tournament. The Collision broadcast was also notable for Thunder Rosa's first match since August 2022 due to a back injury.

== Production ==
Other on-screen personnel
Role	Name
Commentators	Excalibur (Dynamite, Rampage)
Commentators	Tony Schiavone (all three shows)
Commentators	Taz (Dynamite)
Commentators	Toni Storm (Dynamite - Riho vs. Saraya)
Commentators	Jim Ross (Dynamite - main event)
Commentators	Chris Jericho (Rampage)
Commentators	Kevin Kelly (Collision)
Commentators	Nigel McGuinness (Collision)
Commentators	Matt Menard (Collision - Garcia vs. King)
Ring announcers	Justin Roberts (Dynamite, Rampage)
Ring announcers	Dasha Gonzalez (Collision)
Referees	Aubrey Edwards
Referees	Bryce Remsberg
Referees	Mike Posey
Referees	Paul Turner
Referees	Rick Knox
Referees	Brandon Martinez
Referees	Stephon Smith
Interviewers	Renee Paquette
Interviewers	Lexy Nair

=== Background ===
Holiday Bash is an annual professional wrestling Christmas television special produced by All Elite Wrestling (AEW) since 2020. While the original event only aired as a special episode of AEW's flagship program, Wednesday Night Dynamite, the 2021 event expanded it to a two-part event, with the second part airing as a special episode of Friday Night Rampage (although in 2021, Rampage aired on Saturday instead of its usual Friday slot). The 2023 event was then expanded to a three-part event, with the third night airing as a special episode of Saturday Night Collision, AEW's third weekly program that launched in June 2023. Dynamite aired live on December 20 on TBS and was held at the Paycom Center in Oklahoma City, Oklahoma, while Rampage was taped that same night and aired on tape delay on December 22 on TNT. Collision aired live on December 23 on TNT and was held at the Frost Bank Center in San Antonio, Texas.

=== Storylines ===
Holiday Bash featured professional wrestling matches that involved different wrestlers from pre-existing scripted feuds and storylines, written by AEW's writers. Storylines were produced on AEW's weekly television programs, Dynamite, Rampage, and Collision.

== Aftermath ==
The League Finals of the Continental Classic tournament were scheduled for the following week's Dynamite: New Year's Smash. As a result of Jay White's win over Jon Moxley on Dynamite: Holiday Bash, that tied him in points with Moxley and Swerve Strickland, with the three facing off in a three-way match in the Gold League Final. Additionally, due to Bryan Danielson and Claudio Castagnoli's time limit draw on Collision: Holiday Bash, that kept Danielson ahead in points to face Eddie Kingston in the Blue League Final. At Dynamite: New Year's Smash, Moxley and Kingston won their respective League Final matches to face each other in the Championship Final at Worlds End.

== Results ==
=== Night 1 ===
Dynamite (aired live December 20)
No.	Results	Stipulations	Times
1	Swerve Strickland defeated Rush by pinfall	AEW Continental Classic Gold League match	14:50
2	Mark Briscoe defeated Jay Lethal by pinfall	AEW Continental Classic Gold League match	13:55
3	Riho defeated Saraya by pinfall	Singles match to determine the #1 contender for the AEW Women's World Championship at Worlds End	6:30
4	Roderick Strong (with Matt Taven and Mike Bennett) defeated Komander (with Alex Abrahantes) by pinfall	Singles match	10:00
5	Jay White defeated Jon Moxley by pinfall	AEW Continental Classic Gold League match	15:05

=== Night 2 ===
Rampage (taped December 20; aired December 22)
No.	Results	Stipulations	Times
1	Orange Cassidy (c) (with Trent Beretta) defeated Rocky Romero by pinfall	Singles match for the AEW International Championship	11:00
2	The Kingdom (Matt Taven and Mike Bennett) (with Roderick Strong) defeated The Hardys (Jeff Hardy and Matt Hardy)	Tag team match	9:00
3	Skye Blue defeated Queen Aminata by submission	Singles match	3:30
4	El Hijo del Vikingo (c) defeated Black Taurus by pinfall	Singles match for the AAA Mega Championship	14:00
(c) / – the champion(s) heading into the match

=== Night 3 ===
Collision (aired live December 23)
No.	Results	Stipulations	Times
1	Bryan Danielson vs. Claudio Castagnoli ended in a time limit draw	AEW Continental Classic Blue League match	20:00
2	Billy Gunn and The Acclaimed (Max Caster and Anthony Bowens) (c) defeated Top Flight (Dante Martin and Darius Martin) and Action Andretti by pinfall	Trios match for the AEW World Trios Championship	9:20
3	Keith Lee defeated Brian Cage (with Prince Nana) by pinfall	Singles match	9:55
4	Daniel Garcia defeated Brody King by pinfall	AEW Continental Classic Blue League match	10:20
5	Thunder Rosa and Abadon defeated Julia Hart and Skye Blue by pinfall	Tag team match	9:00
6	Eddie Kingston defeated Andrade El Idolo by pinfall	AEW Continental Classic Blue League match	15:30
(c) / – the champion(s) heading into the match
