= Worlds End (2023) =

All Elite Wrestling pay-per-view event

- Promotional poster featuring MJF and Samoa Joe
- Promotion: All Elite Wrestling
- Date: December 30, 2023
- City: Uniondale, New York
- Venue: Nassau Coliseum
- Attendance: 10,093
- Buy rate: 141,000

Pay-per-view chronology
← Previous; Full Gear	Next → Revolution

Worlds End chronology
← Previous; First	Next → 2024

The 2023 Worlds End was a professional wrestling pay-per-view (PPV) event produced by All Elite Wrestling (AEW). It was the inaugural Worlds End and took place on December 30, 2023, at the Nassau Coliseum in Uniondale, New York on Long Island, marking AEW's first PPV to be held in the state of New York. The event featured the final of the inaugural Continental Classic to crown the inaugural AEW Continental Champion, and subsequently, AEW's first "American Triple Crown Champion".

Thirteen matches were contested at the event, including three on the "Zero Hour" pre-show. In the main event, Samoa Joe defeated MJF by technical submission to win the AEW World Championship. In another prominent match, Eddie Kingston defeated Jon Moxley in the Continental Classic final to become Triple Crown Champion, retaining the ROH World Championship and NJPW Strong Openweight Championship and winning the inaugural AEW Continental Championship. The event also saw the final match in AEW for both Andrade El Ídolo and Miro as Andrade's contract expired following the event, which would eventually return to WWE at the start of 2024, and Miro's contract expired in February 2025; however, Andrade would later leave WWE in September 2025 and return to AEW that same October; while Worlds End also saw the final AEW appearance of Danhausen, as he would be sidelined for two years and then subsequently signed with the WWE at the end of February 2026.

== Production ==
=== Background ===
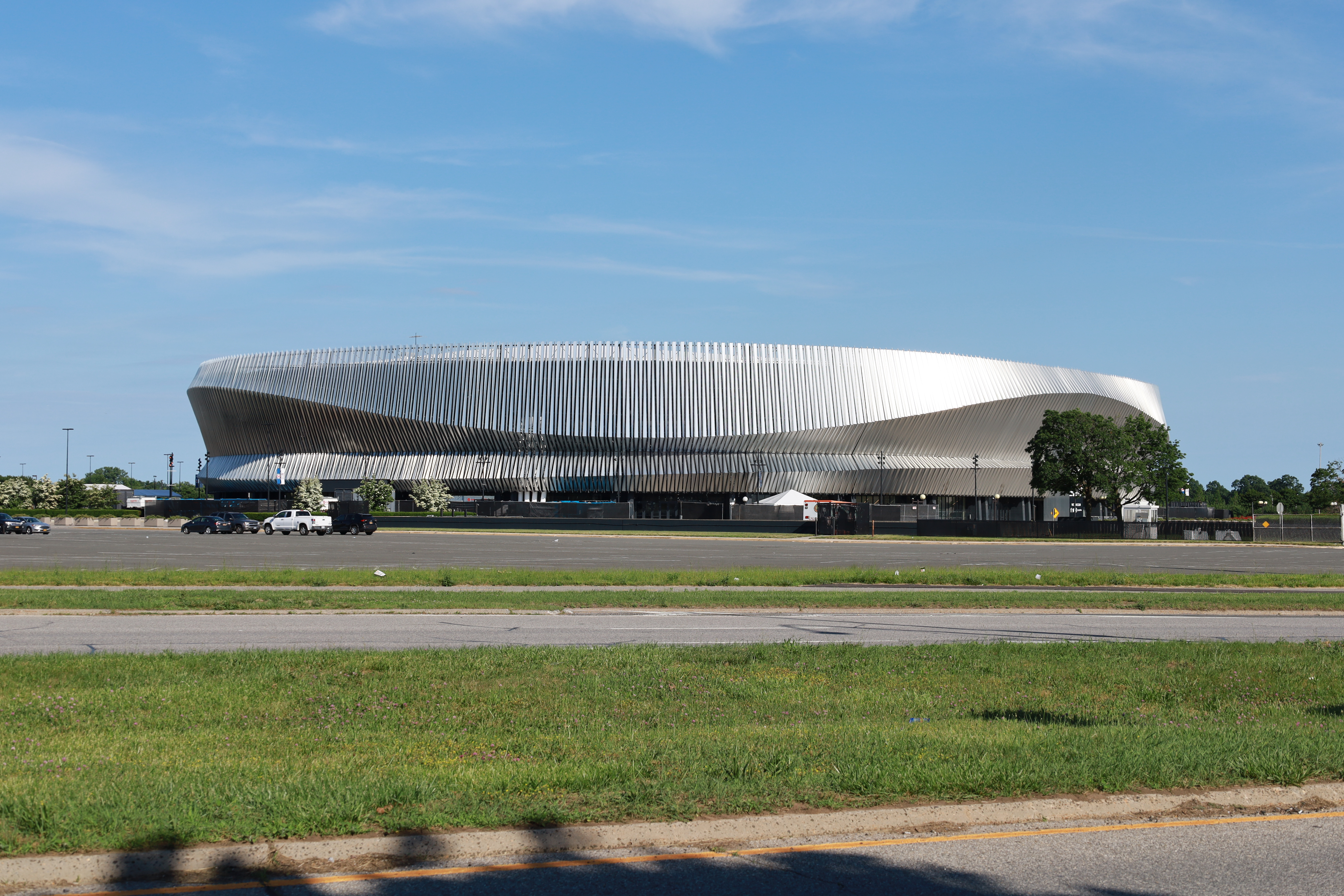
Worlds End was held at the Nassau Veterans Memorial Coliseum in Uniondale, New York on Long Island, marking All Elite Wrestling's first pay-per-view event to be held in New York state.

On October 25, 2023, it was reported that the American professional wrestling promotion All Elite Wrestling (AEW) had filed to trademark the name "Worlds End". Later that same night on Dynamite, AEW announced that it would hold a pay-per-view (PPV) event titled Worlds End on December 30, 2023, at the Nassau Coliseum in Uniondale, New York on Long Island, marking the company's first PPV to be held in the state of New York. Tickets went on sale on November 3, 2023.

=== Storylines ===
Worlds End featured professional wrestling matches that are the result of pre-existing feuds and storylines, with results being predetermined by AEW's writers. Storylines were produced on AEW's weekly television programs, Dynamite, Collision, and Rampage, and the YouTube series, Being The Dark Order.

On the November 11 episode of Collision, AEW president Tony Khan announced the Continental Classic (C2), a 12-man round-robin tournament similar to New Japan Pro-Wrestling's (NJPW) G1 Climax, to be held across episodes of Dynamite, Rampage, and Collision, starting from the November 22 episode of Dynamite, with the semi-finals (promoted as the League Finals) held on December 27 at Dynamite: New Year's Smash and the Championship Final held at Worlds End. Bryan Danielson announced his participation in the C2, despite his orbital bone injury. Eddie Kingston also announced his participation and that his ROH World Championship of sister promotion Ring of Honor (ROH) and his NJPW Strong Openweight Championship would also be on the line in the tournament final. In addition to those two titles, it was also revealed that the winner of the tournament would become the inaugural AEW Continental Champion, with the three titles then being collectively held and defended under the American Triple Crown Championship banner. In the League Finals at Dynamite: New Year's Smash, Kingston and Jon Moxley won the respective Blue League and Gold League Finals, thus setting up the Championship Final at Worlds End.

At Dynamite: Grand Slam on September 20, MJF defeated Samoa Joe to retain the AEW World Championship. Also during that match, MJF's tag team partner Adam Cole injured his foot after he jumped off the entrance ramp when he came out to support MJF. Cole subsequently was unable to defend the ROH World Tag Team Championship with MJF, who was scheduled to defend it during the Full Gear Zero Hour pre-show on November 18. Joe offered to be MJF's partner for the title defense on the condition that MJF would give him another opportunity at the AEW World Championship. MJF initially declined, but he eventually agreed after Joe saved him from a beatdown, and they retained the title, although MJF suffered a minor injury. On the subsequent episode of Dynamite, after Cole convinced him to keep his promise, MJF said he would defend the AEW World Championship against Joe that night, but Joe declined as he instead wanted to face a healed up MJF in the main event at Worlds End in MJF's hometown of Long Island, and MJF accepted.

At WrestleDream, after Christian Cage retained the AEW TNT Championship against Darby Allin, Cage, Luchasaurus, and Nick Wayne continued their attack on Allin until Sting attempted to make the save, but he was also attacked. As Luchasaurus and Wayne were about to perform a con-chair-to on Sting, Adam Copeland made his AEW debut and saved Sting and Allin. On the following episode of Dynamite, Copeland told Cage that he came to AEW to reform their tag team so they could have one more run together before retiring, but Cage rejected the offer. This would lead to a match at Full Gear where Copeland, Sting, and Allin defeated The Patriarchy (Cage, Luchasaurus, and Wayne). Copeland then faced Cage for the TNT Championship on the December 6 episode of Dynamite, but lost after Wayne's mother Shayna interfered and hit Copeland with the title belt. after the match, Shayna Wayne revealed she had signed with AEW, now working under the ring name, Mother Wayne. On December 16 at Collision: Winter Is Coming, Copeland challenged Cage to a No Disqualification match for the TNT Championship at Worlds End, and Cage accepted.

At Full Gear, The Golden Jets (Chris Jericho and Kenny Omega) defeated The Young Bucks (Matt Jackson and Nick Jackson) to earn the latter's AEW World Tag Team Championship opportunity. During Dynamite: Winter Is Coming on December 13, The Golden Jets called out champions Ricky Starks and Big Bill to invoke their title match for Worlds End, which was accepted. However, two days later on December 15, Omega revealed he had been legitimately diagnosed with diverticulitis, thus taking him out of action indefinitely and canceling the match at Worlds End. On December 23 during Collision: Holiday Bash, Jericho announced he would find a new partner for the championship match at an unknown date. The following week during Dynamite: New Year's Smash, Jericho saved a returning Sammy Guevara from a beatdown by The Don Callis Family (Konosuke Takeshita, Powerhouse Hobbs, and Kyle Fletcher), with Starks and Bill subsequently coming out to attack Jericho and Guevara. Sting and Darby Allin then came out to help Jericho and Guevara clear the ring. Later, an eight-man tag team match was scheduled for Worlds End, pitting the team of the reunited Le Sex Gods (Jericho and Guevara) along with Sting and Allin against the team of Starks, Bill, and The Don Callis Family (Takeshita and Hobbs).

== Event ==
Other on-screen personnel
Role	Name
Commentators	Excalibur (Pre-show and PPV)
Commentators	Nigel McGuinness (Pre-show and PPV)
Commentators	Taz (Pre-show and PPV)
Commentators	Tony Schiavone (PPV)
Commentators	Stokely Hathaway (Statlander vs. Nightingale)
Commentators	Matt Menard (Eight-man tag team match)
Commentators	Bryan Danielson (Moxley vs. Kingston)
Ring announcers	Justin Roberts
Ring announcers	Dasha Gonzalez
Referees	Aubrey Edwards
Referees	Bryce Remsburg
Referees	Paul Turner
Referees	Rick Knox
Referees	Stephon Smith
Referees	Brandon Martinez
Interviewer	Lexy Nair
Pre-show hosts	Renee Paquette
Pre-show hosts	RJ City

=== Pre-show ===
There were three matches that took place on the pre-show. In the opener, Kris Statlander faced Willow Nightingale. In the closing stages, Willow performed a crossbody and a spinebuster on Statlander for a two-count. Willow then landed a cannonball and a Death Valley Driver for a nearfall. Statlander then delivered a scissors kick to Willow and attempted the Sunday Night Fever, but Willow reversed it into a roll-up pin for a two-count. Statlander then attempted a 450° splash, but Willow moved out of the way and hit the Doctor Bomb and then pinned Statlander to win the match.

The next match was a 20-man battle royal for a future AEW TNT Championship match. In the closing stages, Killswitch delivered chokeslams to both Darius Martin and Action Andretti. Lance Archer and Killswitch then threw Darius and Andretti out of the ring. The final four men were Killswitch, Archer, Trent Beretta and Danhausen. Beretta and Danhausen threw Archer over the top rope. Beretta and Danhausen then hugged each other, but Beretta then tossed Danhausen over the top rope. Beretta then performed three running knee strikes. Beretta attempted another one, but Killswitch impeded him with a chokeslam. Killswitch then attempted to throw Beretta over the top rope, but Beretta still hung on. Killswitch then performed an uppercut on Beretta and Beretta was eliminated, thus Killswitch won the battle royal.

In the pre-show main event, Hook defended the FTW Championship against Wheeler Yuta under FTW Rules. In the closing stages, Yuta hit Hook with a stop sign and delivered a senton to him for a two-count. Hook then landed a northern lights suplex on Yuta for a two-count. As Hook attempted to lock in Red Rum, Yuta escaped and delivered a German suplex and a fisherman suplex to Hook. Yuta then hit Hook with the lid of a trash can and landed a DDT for a nearfall. Hook then hit Yuta with a hockey stick and used the remnants of the hockey stick to lock in a hockey stick-assisted Red Rum, forcing Yuta to tap out.

=== Preliminary matches ===
In the opening contest, Blackpool Combat Club (Bryan Danielson and Claudio Castagnoli), Mark Briscoe and Daniel Garcia faced Jay Lethal, Brody King, Jay White and Rush. In the opening stages, Danielson delivered Yes! Kicks in the corner to White and a diving hurricarana. King then delivered a Bossman Slam to Garcia. Mark then delivered an apron brain buster to White and a cactus elbow to Rush. Claudio then performed a stalling suplex to King for a two-count after Rush broke up the pin. Rush and King then performed a punt kick/senton combination to Danielson. Claudio and Danielson then performed a Gianr Swing/dropkick to King for a two-count. Lethal locked in the Figure Four Leglock on Garcia, but Mark used the Froggy Bow splash to break up the submission attempt. Danielson then landed a Busaiku Knee to Lethal, White hit Danielson with the Bladerunner, Claudio delivered a pop-up uppercut and a discus lariat to White, Garcia delivered a Saito suplex to Rush. Lethal then attempted the Lethal Injection, but Garcia impeded him with a jacknife pin to win the match.

Next, Miro faced Andrade El Ídolo (accompanied by CJ Perry). In the closing stages, Andrade attempted a suicide dive, but Miro impeded him with a uranage. Andrade then delivered a feint moonsault to Miro for a two-count. Miro then delivered the Machka Kick and attempted to lock in Game Over, but Andrade went to the ropes. Andrade then performed a back elbow to Miro for a two-count. Andrade then locked in the Figure Four Leglock on Miro and attempted to transition into the Figure Eight, but CJ betrayed Andrade and swiped his hands. As Andrade was distracted by CJ, Miro hit the Machka Kick and then locked in Game Over, forcing Andrade to tap out. At the time, this was the final match for both men in AEW, as Andrade would leave the company immediately after the event (although he would eventually return in October 2025), and Miro would not be used on AEW programming again after the event before his contract expired in February 2025.

Next, "Timeless" Toni Storm (accompanied by Luther the Butler and Mariah May) defended the AEW Women's World Championship against Riho. In the closing stages, Riho performed a corner running knee, a bulldog and a roundhouse kick to Storm. Storm then landed a sitout spine buster to Riho for a two-count. Storm locked in the Texas Cloverleaf and as Riho attempted to get to the ropes, Luther pulled her. The referee then ejected Luther from ringside. Riho then performed the 619 and a dragon suplex to Storm for a two-count. Storm then delivered a pildriver and the Storm Zero to Riho for a two-count. Storm then delivered a DDT to Riho and pinned her to retain her title.

Next, Swerve Strickland (accompanied by Prince Nana) faced Dustin Rhodes. Before the match started, Swerve performed a double stomp onto Dustin's ankle on a cinderblock. Swerve then performed a running boot to Dustin in the corner. Dustin then delivered an uppercut and a diving splash to Swerve. Dustin then performed a Canadian Destroyer and a snap powerslam on Swerve for a two-count. Dustin then hit Shattered Dreams and the Cross Rhodes on Swerve for a nearfall. Swerve then performed a double stomp to Dustin's knees and then hit the Swerve Stomp and pinned him to win the match.

Next, Sting, Darby Allin and Le Sex Gods (Chris Jericho and Sammy Guevara) faced Ricky Starks, Big Bill and The Don Callis Family (Konosuke Takeshita and Powerhouse Hobbs) (accompanied by Don Callis). In the closing stages, Takeshita attempted a German suplex to Allin, but Allin reversed it into a Code Red for a two-count. Takeshita then hit Allin with an avalanche Blue Thunder Bomb. Guevara then performed a cutter on Starks, but Big Bill broke up the pin. Big Bill then hit Guevara with a Bossman Slam, but Jericho then hit Big Bill with a Codebreaker. Hobbs then hit the Last Testament Spinebuster on Jericho and the World's Strongest Slam. Sting then delivered the Scorpion Death Drop to Hobbs. As Guevara attempted a suicide dive, Starks impeded it with a spear for a nearfall. Starks attempted the RoShamBo, but Guevara escaped and hit a superkick. Guevara then delivered the GTH and a shooting star press to Starks and pinned him to in the match.

The next match was for the AEW TBS Championship contested between defending champion Julia Hart and Abadon. In the closing stages, Hart performed a northern lights suplex to Abadon on the outside. Hart then performed a superplex and a running clothesline to Abadon. Abadon then delivered a spinning sit-out slam and a knee strike to Hart for a two-count. As Hart was distracting the referee, Skye Blue came down to the ring and pushed Abadon. Abadon then delivered a clothesline to Blue on the outside, but Hart pushed Abadon into the steps and repeatedly hit Abadon's head into the steps. Hart then performed a moonsault to Abadon and pinned her to retain her title.

The next match was a No Disqualification match for the AEW TNT Championship between defending champion Christian Cage (accompanied by Mother Wayne and her son Nick Wayne) and Adam Copeland. In the opening stages, Copeland delivered a diving crossbody off the balcony onto Christian. Christian attempted to hit Copeland with a wrench, but Copeland ducked and delivered the Sitout Rear Mat Slam for a two-count. Copeland then locked in a wrench-assisted crossface, but Christian escaped. Copeland then slingshot Christian into a wedged ladder. Copeland attempted to deliver a superplex to Christian from the ladder, but Christina blocked and delivered a sunset flip powerbomb from the ladder for a two-count. Nick Wayne then brought out a table from under the ring and set it up. Christian attempted to suplex Copeland through the table, but Copeland blocked it. Copeland then landed the Impaler DDT to Christian onto a chair. Copeland then attempted to deliver a con-chair-to to Christian, but Nick stopped it, allowing Christian to deliver a low blow to Copeland with the chair. Christian then set up a table in the corner and attempted a spear, but Copeland leapfrogged and threw a chair into Christian's face. Copeland then hit the Spear to Christian through the table and attempted to pin Christian, but Mother Wayne pulled the referee out the ring. Nick then hit Copeland with the title belt and then delivered Wayne's World. Nick then rolled Copeland into the ring and Christian pinned him for a two-count. Nick then lit the table on the outside with lighter fluid. Copeland then hit another spear to Christian and delivered a powerbomb to Wayne through the lighted table. Christian attempted a spear, but Copeland impeded it with a low blow. Copeland then delivered the Killswitch and pinned Christian to win the TNT title. After the match, Killswitch delivered a clothesline to the back of Copeland's head and then delivered a chokeslam onto a chair. Killswitch then attempted to cash-in the contract he won on the pre-show, but Christian stopped him and told him to give him the contract. Christian then signed the contract and the TNT Championship was again defended, this time Copeland was the defending champion. The referee rang the bell and Christian immediately delivered a spear and pinned Copeland to win the title for a second time.

In the penultimate match, Eddie Kingston faced Jon Moxley in the Continental Classic Final to crown the inaugural American Triple Crown Champion (ROH World Championship, Strong Openweight Championship and the inaugural AEW Continental Championship). In the opening stages, Kingston landed chops and an enzeguiri to Moxley. Kingston attempted the spinning backfist, but Moxley ducked and landed a German suplex. Moxley then delivered the Paradigm Shift and a punt kick to Kingston on the outside. Kingston then landed multiple Machine Gun chops and hit the spinning backfist, but he buckled his knee trying to make the cover. Moxley then delivered a piledriver to Kingston for a two-count. Kingston landed a DDT, but Moxley immediately delivered a cutter. Kingston delivered another spinning backfist, but Moxley delivered a lariat. Kingston then delivered a Northern Lights Bomb for a nearfall. Moxley then locked in a bulldog choke, but Kingston escaped and hit another Northern Lights Bomb for a two-count. Moxley delivered a lariat for a two-count. Both men then performed open palm strikes and Kingston then immediately delivered a spinning backfist and pinned Moxley to win the AEW Continental Championship. With this win, Kingston became the inaugural American Triple Crown Champion and the first man in AEW to hold three titles simultaneously.

=== Main event ===
In the main event, MJF (accompanied by Adam Cole) defended the AEW World Championship against Samoa Joe. In the opening stages, Joe delivered a big boot and a senton for a two-count. MJF then performed an inside cradle on Joe for a two-count. Joe then delivered a dropkick and a suicide dive to MJF. Joe then delivered a German suplex, a dragon suplex and a straightjacket suplex to MJF, but MJF got his foot on the ropes. Joe then delivered an apron Muscle Buster to MJF for a two-count. MJF then performed a Heatseeker on Joe for a two-count. MJF attempted another Heatseeker, but Joe muscled him onto his shoulders. MJF then landed a sunset flip powerbomb to Joe while on his shoulders for a two-count. Joe then locked in the Coquina Clutch, but MJF pushed him into the referee. MJF then delivered an avalanche Death Valley Driver to Joe for a nearfall. MJF then asked Cole to give him his Dynamite Diamond Ring, but Joe used the opportunity and locked in the Coquina Clutch, forcing MJF to pass out and then become the new champion. After the match, Cole attempted to console MJF. The Devil's Masked Men then appeared and attempted to attack MJF and Cole. The lights went out and came back on and Cole was sitting on a chair with the Masked Men. The Masked Men were then revealed to be Roderick Strong, Matt Taven, Mike Bennett and Wardlow, with Cole then revealed as The Devil. Strong then hit a jumping knee strike to MJF and Wardlow delivered a powerbomb to MJF to close out the show.

== Reception ==
Mike Malkasian of Wrestling Headlines gave the overall show an 8/10, saying that "the show was a rollercoaster and the opener, the TNT title match and the main event delivered the strongest. The rest of the card was fine, but underwhelming".

Doc-Chris Mueller of Bleacher Report gave the show a C+, saying that "this PPV had a couple of really great matches and moments, but when compared to every other major event AEW has held, this one might be considered one of the worst. It wasn't a bad show, but there were so many things that felt overbooked, mediocre or just plain wrong that it was hard to stay invested throughout the entire thing. Kingston winning was the biggest highlight of the night, but Cage and Copeland probably came in a close second place. All in all, Worlds End was a down-the-middle PPV with a few memorable moments".

Dave Meltzer of the Wrestling Observer Newsletter rated the following matches: the Statlander vs. Nightingale match and the Battle Royal 2 stars, the FTW Championship match 3.75 stars, the eight-man tag team match, the No Disqualification match and the Continental Classic final 4.75 stars (the highest rated matches on the card), the Miro-Andrade bout 4 stars, the AEW Women's World Championship and the AEW World Championship matches 3.5 stars, the Swerve-Dustin bout 3.75 stars, the eight-man tag team 2.5 stars, and the TBS title match 1.75 stars (the lowest rated match on the card).

== Aftermath ==
The following episode of Dynamite began with Samoa Joe stating that he would be taking everything from anyone who tried to dethrone him for the AEW World Championship. The following week, on January 10, Joe declared that challengers would be determined by "their record and reputation", before being accosted by "Hangman" Adam Page, Swerve Strickland, and Hook in quick succession. Joe would then retreat, with Hook stating "one week". This would follow up with Hook as Joe's first opponent for the AEW World Championship, which Joe would retain.

Also on Dynamite, Adam Cole, Wardlow, Roderick Strong, Matt Taven, and Mike Bennett, now dubbed the Undisputed Kingdom, taunted MJF and stated that he would never be coming back. Cole also stated that it was a pleasure doing business with Samoa Joe, but said that Wardlow would eventually win the AEW World Championship and give it to Cole. MJF would eventually return at Double or Nothing.

Additionally, Chris Jericho chose Sammy Guevara as his new partner to challenge for the AEW World Tag Team Championship, which was scheduled as a Street Fight at Battle of the Belts IX.

== Results ==
No.	Results	Stipulations	Times
1^{P}	Willow Nightingale defeated Kris Statlander by pinfall	Singles match	13:25
2^{P}	Killswitch won by last eliminating Trent Beretta (Note: Order of elimination: Serpentico, Dalton Castle, Johnny TV, Lee Johnson, Angelo Parker, Alex Reynolds, John Silver, Kip Sabian, Bryan Keith, Matt Menard, Christopher Daniels, Rocky Romero, Darius Martin, Action Andretti, The Blade, The Butcher, Lance Archer, Danhausen, and Trent Beretta)	20-man Battle Royale for a future AEW TNT Championship match	13:50
3^{P}	Hook (c) defeated Wheeler Yuta by submission	FTW Rules match for the FTW Championship	10:20
4	Blackpool Combat Club (Claudio Castagnoli and Bryan Danielson), Mark Briscoe, and Daniel Garcia defeated Jay Lethal, Brody King, Jay White, and Rush by pinfall	Eight-man tag team match	17:50
5	Miro defeated Andrade El Ídolo (with CJ Perry) by submission	Singles match	14:45
6	"Timeless" Toni Storm (c) (with Luther and Mariah May) defeated Riho by pinfall	Singles match for the AEW Women's World Championship	11:40
7	Swerve Strickland (with Prince Nana) defeated Dustin Rhodes (Note: Strickland was originally scheduled to face Keith Lee; as Lee was not medically cleared to compete, he was replaced by his Naturally Limitless tag team partner Rhodes.) by pinfall	Singles match	9:30
8	Sting, Darby Allin, and Le Sex Gods (Chris Jericho and Sammy Guevara) defeated Ricky Starks, Big Bill, and The Don Callis Family (Konosuke Takeshita and Powerhouse Hobbs) (with Don Callis) by pinfall	Eight-man tag team match	15:40
9	Julia Hart (c) defeated Abadon by pinfall	"House Rules" match for the AEW TBS Championship; Abadon's stipulation was that biting was legal.	11:35
10	Adam Copeland defeated Christian Cage (c) (with Mother Wayne and Nick Wayne) by pinfall	No Disqualification match for the AEW TNT Championship	25:00
11	Christian Cage (with Mother Wayne, Nick Wayne, and Killswitch) defeated Adam Copeland (c) by pinfall	Singles match for the AEW TNT Championship; Cage immediately invoked the title shot earned by Killswitch on the pre-show.	0:11
12	Eddie Kingston (c) (Note: Kingston came into the event as the ROH World and NJPW Strong Openweight Champion) defeated Jon Moxley by pinfall	Championship Final of the Continental Classic for the inaugural American Triple Crown Championship (ROH World Championship, NJPW Strong Openweight Championship, and the inaugural AEW Continental Championship)	17:20
13	Samoa Joe defeated MJF (c) (with Adam Cole) by technical submission	Singles match for the AEW World Championship	17:50
(c) / – the champion(s) heading into the match; P / – the match was broadcast on the pre-show

=== Continental Classic tournament ===
Legend
Qualified to league final

Participants
Blue League		Gold League	
Bryan Danielson	10	Jon Moxley	12
Eddie Kingston (Note: Kingston advanced to the Blue League final due to his head-to-head victory over Andrade.)	9	Swerve Strickland	12
Andrade El Idolo	9	Jay White	12
Claudio Castagnoli	7	Rush	6
Brody King	6	Mark Briscoe	3
Daniel Garcia	3	Jay Lethal	0

Tournament overview
Blue League	Andrade	Castagnoli	Danielson	Garcia	King	Kingston
Andrade	—N/a	Castagnoli (15:33)	Andrade (18:33)	Andrade (11:02)	Andrade (14:45)	Kingston (15:39)
Castagnoli	Castagnoli (15:33)	—N/a	Draw (20:00)	Castagnoli (10:27)	King (12:34)	Kingston (18:04)
Danielson	Andrade (18:33)	Draw (20:00)	—N/a	Danielson (15:35)	Danielson (15:11)	Danielson (16:50)
Garcia	Andrade (11:02)	Castagnoli (10:27)	Danielson (15:35)	—N/a	Garcia (10:21)	Kingston (12:12)
King	Andrade (14:45)	King (12:34)	Danielson (15:11)	Garcia (10:21)	—N/a	King (16:41)
Kingston	Kingston (15:39)	Kingston (18:04)	Danielson (16:50)	Kingston (12:12)	King (16:41)	—N/a
Gold League	Briscoe	Lethal	Moxley	Rush	Strickland	White
Briscoe	—N/a	Briscoe (13:53)	Moxley (11:29)	Rush (11:25)	Strickland (15:44)	White (11:19)
Lethal	Briscoe (13:53)	—N/a	Moxley (11:19)	Rush (4:30)	Strickland (13:51)	White (11:24)
Moxley	Moxley (11:29)	Moxley (11:19)	—N/a	Moxley (14:32)	Moxley (16:23)	White (15:09)
Rush	Rush (11:25)	Rush (4:30)	Moxley (14:32)	—N/a	Strickland (14:53)	White (13:53)
Strickland	Strickland (15:44)	Strickland (13:51)	Moxley (16:23)	Strickland (14:53)	—N/a	Strickland (15:27)
White	White (11:19)	White (11:24)	White (15:09)	White (13:53)	Strickland (15:27)	—N/a

League Finals; Dynamite: New Year's Smash (December 27)
Bryan Danielson	22:37
Eddie Kingston	Pin
Jon Moxley	Pin
Swerve Strickland Jay White	— 23:14

Championship Final; Worlds End (December 30)
Blue	Eddie Kingston	Pin
Gold	Jon Moxley	17:16
