= Holiday Bash (2022) =

All Elite Wrestling two-part television special

- Promotion: All Elite Wrestling
- Date: December 21, 2022 (aired December 21, 2022 and December 23, 2022)
- City: San Antonio, Texas
- Venue: Freeman Coliseum
- Attendance: 5,317

Holiday Bash chronology
← Previous; 2021	Next → 2023

AEW Dynamite special episodes chronology
← Previous; Winter Is Coming	Next → New Year's Smash

AEW Rampage special episodes chronology
← Previous; Grand Slam	Next → New Year's Smash

The 2022 Holiday Bash was the third annual Holiday Bash professional wrestling Christmas television special produced by All Elite Wrestling (AEW). It took place on December 21, 2022, at the Freeman Coliseum in San Antonio, Texas. The two-part event was broadcast as special episodes of AEW's weekly television programs, Wednesday Night Dynamite and Friday Night Rampage. Dynamite aired live on TBS while Rampage aired on tape delay on December 23 on TNT.

== Production ==
=== Background ===
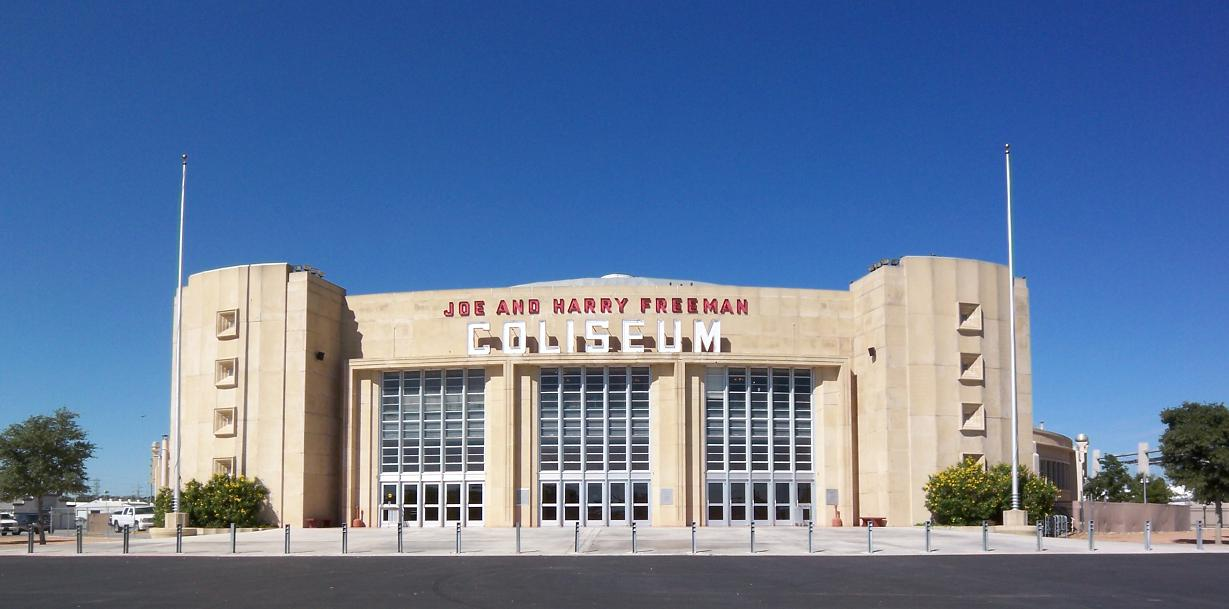
The event was held at the Freeman Coliseum in San Antonio, Texas.

Holiday Bash is an annual Christmas television special produced by All Elite Wrestling (AEW) since 2020. While the original event only aired as a special episode of AEW's flagship program, Wednesday Night Dynamite, the 2021 event expanded it to a two-part event, with the second part airing as a special episode of Rampage, which aired on Saturday instead of its usual Friday. On October 12, 2022, it was announced that the third Holiday Bash would take place on December 21 at the Freeman Coliseum in San Antonio, Texas. Dynamite aired live on TBS while Rampage aired on tape delay on Friday, December 23 on TNT.

=== Storylines ===
Holiday Bash featured professional wrestling matches that involved different wrestlers from pre-existing scripted feuds and storylines. Wrestlers portrayed heroes, villains, or less distinguishable characters in scripted events that built tension and culminated in a wrestling match or series of matches. Storylines were produced on AEW's weekly television programs, Dynamite and Rampage, the supplementary online streaming shows, Dark and Elevation, and The Young Bucks' YouTube series Being The Elite.

At Full Gear, Death Triangle (Pac, Penta El Zero Miedo, and Rey Fénix) defeated The Elite (Kenny Omega, Matt Jackson, and Nick Jackson) to retain the AEW World Trios Championship. Afterwards, it was announced that the Full Gear match was the first in a Best of Seven Series for the championship. Death Triangle would again defeat The Elite on the following episode of Dynamite, but The Elite gained a win on the next week's episode. At Winter Is Coming, Death Triangle secured another win to lead the series at 3–1. The fifth match in the series was scheduled for Dynamite: Holiday Bash as a No Disqualification match.

== Aftermath ==
With The Elite's (Kenny Omega, Matt Jackson, and Nick Jackson) win over Death Triangle (Pac, Penta El Zero Miedo, and Rey Fénix), it brought the series to 3–2, with the sixth match scheduled for Dynamite: New Year's Smash as a Falls Count Anywhere match.

== Results ==
Dynamite (aired live December 21)
No.	Results	Stipulations	Times
1	The Elite (Kenny Omega, Matt Jackson, and Nick Jackson) (with Brandon Cutler and Michael Nakazawa) defeated Death Triangle (Pac, Penta El Zero Miedo, and Rey Fénix) (with Alex Abrahantes) by pinfall	No Disqualification Six-man tag team match Match five in a Best of Seven Series for the AEW World Trios Championship (Death Triangle leads 3–2)	13:35
2	Hook defeated Exodus Prime by submission	Singles match	1:10
3	Jon Moxley (with Claudio Castagnoli) defeated Darius Martin (with Dante Martin) by pinfall	Singles match	8:50
4	The Gunns (Austin Gunn and Colten Gunn) defeated FTR (Cash Wheeler and Dax Harwood) by pinfall	Tag team match	9:10
5	Jamie Hayter (c) (with Dr. Britt Baker, D.M.D. and Rebel) defeated Hikaru Shida by pinfall	Singles match for the AEW Women's World Championship	16:15
(c) / – the champion(s) heading into the match

Rampage (aired on tape delay December 23)
No.	Results	Stipulations	Times
1	AR Fox and Top Flight (Dante Martin and Darius Martin) won by last eliminating Claudio Castagnoli (representing Blackpool Combat Club) (Note: Participants were: La Facción Ingobernable (Rush, Dralístico and Preston Vance), Kip Sabian, The Butcher and The Blade, Orange Cassidy and Best Friends (Trent Beretta and Chuck Taylor), The Dark Order (John Silver, Alex Reynolds, and Evil Uno), The Spanish Announce Project (Angélico, Serpentico, and Luther), Ari Daivari and The Varsity Athletes (Tony Nese and Josh Woods), Blackpool Combat Club (Jon Moxley, Claudio Castagnoli, and Wheeler Yuta) and A.R. Fox and Top Flight (Dante Martin and Darius Martin))	$300,000 Three Kings Christmas Casino Trios Royale	22:01
2	Jade Cargill (with The Baddies (Kiera Hogan and Leila Grey)) defeated VertVixen by pinfall	AEW TBS Championship Eliminator match Had VertVixen won, she would have received a future title shot at Cargill's AEW TBS Championship.	4:57
3	Jay Lethal and Jeff Jarrett (with Sonjay Dutt and Satnam Singh) defeated Anthony Bowens and Billy Gunn (with Max Caster) by pinfall	Tag team match	11:46
