= AEW Holiday Bash =

All Elite Wrestling television special series

- AEW Holiday Bash logo for Dynamite
- Promotions: All Elite Wrestling
- First event: 2020

AEW Holiday Bash is an annual professional wrestling television special produced by the American promotion All Elite Wrestling (AEW). Established in 2020, the event airs in December as one of AEW's Christmas-themed broadcasts. The inaugural event aired as a special episode of the promotion's flagship weekly television program, Wednesday Night Dynamite. In 2021, the event expanded to two nights, with the second night airing as a special episode of Friday Night Rampage. In 2023, the event added a third night, airing as a special episode of Saturday Night Collision. In 2024, the event returned to a two-night format on Dynamite and Rampage and then Dynamite and Collision in 2025 after Rampage's cancellation at the end of 2024.

== History ==
On December 9, 2020, the American professional wrestling company All Elite Wrestling (AEW) announced that the December 23 episode of their flagship television program, Dynamite, would be a special episode titled Holiday Bash, broadcast on TNT. The Christmas television special was taped on December 17 at Daily's Place in Jacksonville, Florida due to the ongoing COVID-19 pandemic.

AEW resumed live touring in July 2021. On December 7 that year, AEW President Tony Khan confirmed that Holiday Bash would return, expanding to a two-part event. The first part aired live on December 22 for Dynamite while the second part aired on tape delay on Christmas Day as a special episode of Rampage—AEW's secondary television program that began airing in August 2021 on TNT. The event took place at the Greensboro Coliseum in Greensboro, North Carolina. While Rampage usually aired on Fridays, for the Holiday Bash special, it was pushed back to Saturday night because of TNT's traditional Christmas Eve marathon showing of A Christmas Story.

The 2022 event retained the two-part format, but this time with Rampage airing in its normal Friday night time slot as there was not a broadcasting conflict like the previous year. This was also the first Holiday Bash to air on TBS as Dynamite moved to the channel earlier that year in January. The 2023 event then expanded Holiday Bash to a three-part special, also encompassing Collision, AEW's third television program that launched in June 2023 on TNT, airing on Saturdays. The 2024 event reduced it back to Dynamite and Rampage due to Collision airing as a different special that week called Christmas Collision.

Following the cancellation of Rampage at the end of 2024, the 2025 event was broadcast as Dynamite and Collision. The event took place on December 17 and aired on December 17 and 20. The December 17 broadcast was three hours, consisting of a two-hour Dynamite immediately followed by a one-hour Collision, simulcast on TBS and HBO Max, and then another one-hour Collision aired on tape delay on December 20, simulcast on TNT and HBO Max. This marked the first Holiday Bash to take place outside the United States, as it was held in Manchester, England. It also marked the first Holiday Bash to stream on HBO Max following AEW's updated deal with Warner Bros. Discovery that began earlier that year in January.

== Events ==
#	Event	Date	City	Venue	Main event	Ref.
1	Holiday Bash (2020)	Dynamite; December 17, 2020 (aired December 23)	Jacksonville, Florida	Daily's Place	The Young Bucks (Matt Jackson and Nick Jackson) (c) vs. The Acclaimed (Anthony Bowens and Max Caster) for the AEW World Tag Team Championship	
2	Holiday Bash (2021)	Dynamite; December 22, 2021	Greensboro, North Carolina	Greensboro Coliseum	Sting, CM Punk, and Darby Allin vs. The Pinnacle (MJF, Cash Wheeler, and Dax Harwood)	
2	Holiday Bash (2021)	Rampage; December 22, 2021 (aired December 25)	Greensboro, North Carolina	Greensboro Coliseum	Sammy Guevara (c) vs. Cody Rhodes for the AEW TNT Championship	
3	Holiday Bash (2022)	Dynamite; December 21, 2022	San Antonio, Texas	Freeman Coliseum	Jamie Hayter (c) vs. Hikaru Shida for the AEW Women's World Championship	
3	Holiday Bash (2022)	Rampage; December 21, 2022 (aired December 23)	San Antonio, Texas	Freeman Coliseum	Jay Lethal and Jeff Jarrett vs. Anthony Bowens and Billy Gunn	
4	Holiday Bash (2023)	Dynamite; December 20, 2023	Oklahoma City, Oklahoma	Paycom Center	Jon Moxley vs. Jay White in a Continental Classic Gold League match	
4	Holiday Bash (2023)	Rampage; December 20, 2023 (aired December 22)	Oklahoma City, Oklahoma	Paycom Center	El Hijo del Vikingo (c) vs. Black Taurus for the AAA Mega Championship	
4	Holiday Bash (2023)	Collision; December 23, 2023	San Antonio, Texas	Frost Bank Center	Andrade El Idolo vs. Eddie Kingston in a Continental Classic Blue League match	
5	Holiday Bash (2024)	Dynamite; December 18, 2024	Washington, D.C.	Entertainment & Sports Arena	Death Riders (Jon Moxley, Pac, and Wheeler Yuta) vs. "Hangman" Adam Page, Jay White, and Orange Cassidy	
5	Holiday Bash (2024)	Rampage; December 18, 2024 (aired December 20)	Washington, D.C.	Entertainment & Sports Arena	Brody King vs. Komander in a Continental Classic Gold League match	
6	Holiday Bash (2025) (Note: The special consisted of a two-hour episode of Dynamite and two one-hour episodes of Collision. The December 17 broadcast was three hours, encompassing Dynamite and a one-hour Collision, with another one-hour Collision airing on December 20.)	Dynamite; December 17, 2025	Manchester, England	Co-op Live	Dynamite Diamond Battle Royale	
6	Holiday Bash (2025)	Collision; December 17, 2025	Manchester, England	Co-op Live	FTR (Cash Wheeler and Dax Harwood) (c) vs. Bang Bang Gang (Juice Robinson and Austin Gunn) for the AEW World Tag Team Championship	
6	Holiday Bash (2025)	Collision; December 17, 2025 (aired December 20)	Manchester, England	Co-op Live	Kevin Knight vs. Kazuchika Okada in a Continental Classic Gold League match	
(c) – refers to the champion(s) heading into the match

== See also ==
- List of AEW Dynamite special episodes
- List of AEW Rampage special episodes
- List of AEW Collision special episodes
- List of All Elite Wrestling special events
- List of All Elite Wrestling pay-per-view events
