= AEW Collision =

Professional wrestling television program

- AEW Collision logo (2024–present)
- Genre: Professional wrestling
- Created by: Tony Khan
- Presented by: Tony Schiavone (play-by-play commentator); Nigel McGuinness (color commentator); Paul Wight (color commentator)
- Starring: AEW roster
- Opening theme: "Ionized" by Mikey Rukus
- Country of origin: United States
- Original language: English
- No. of seasons: 4
- No. of episodes: 172

Production
- Camera setup: Multi-camera setup
- Running time: 120 minutes (including commercials)
- Production company: All Elite Wrestling

Original release
- Network: TNT
- Release: June 17, 2023 – present
- Network: HBO Max
- Release: January 4, 2025 – present

Related
- AEW Dynamite; Ring of Honor Wrestling

AEW Collision, also known as Saturday Night Collision or simply Collision, is an American professional wrestling television program produced by the American promotion All Elite Wrestling (AEW). It currently airs live every Saturday at 8 p.m. Eastern Time (ET), with some exceptions, and is simulcast on TNT and the streaming service HBO Max. The show premiered on June 17, 2023, and is positioned as AEW's second main program behind Wednesday Night Dynamite.

The show is AEW's third overall program to air on TNT after Dynamite, which aired on TNT from October 2019 to December 2021 before moving to TBS in January 2022, and Friday Night Rampage, which aired on TNT from August 2021 until its cancelation in December 2024. This subsequently makes it the fourth overall wrestling show in general to air on TNT, after Dynamite, Rampage, and the former World Championship Wrestling's (WCW) Monday Nitro (1995–2001), as well as the first Saturday night program on a Ted Turner network since the final episode of WCW Saturday Night on June 24, 2000. Since January 4, 2025, the show has been simulcast on TNT and the streaming service HBO Max, airing live on the streaming platform regardless of the location from where the show is produced.

== History ==
On February 15, 2023, the American professional wrestling promotion All Elite Wrestling (AEW) filed to trademark the name "Collision", hinting at a possible new in-ring television series in addition to their other programs, AEW Dynamite on TBS and AEW Rampage on TNT. Another trademark for the name was filed on April 28, leading to the belief that this would be the name of an upcoming Saturday television show.

On May 17, 2023, AEW and broadcast partner Warner Bros. Discovery (WBD) announced a third weekly television show titled AEW Collision to air live on TNT as a two-hour show on Saturdays starting June 17, 2023, at 8 p.m. Eastern Time (ET). This was AEW's second weekly professional wrestling program to concurrently air on TNT after Rampage (which was cancelled in December 2024) and fourth overall wrestling show in general to air on TNT after Rampage, Dynamite (which aired on TNT from October 2019 to December 2021), and the former World Championship Wrestling's (WCW) Monday Nitro (which aired on TNT from September 1995 to March 2001) and the first wrestling show in a Saturday night time slot to air on a network founded by Ted Turner since the end of WCW Saturday Night on August 19, 2000. It was also revealed that AEW's sister promotion, Ring of Honor (ROH), would move its tapings for ROH Honor Club TV to coincide with Collision, with ROH's show being taped after the live broadcast of Collision.

In preparation for the debut of Collision, AEW's YouTube programs, AEW Dark and AEW Dark: Elevation, were canceled. This was due to an amended deal with WBD, in which all of AEW's programs would air exclusively on their channels. It was also reported that Rampage would begin showcasing younger AEW wrestlers and unsigned independent wrestlers, essentially becoming what Dark and Elevation were for the company.

Prior to the official announcement of Collision, there had been speculation that the inaugural episode would be held at the United Center in Chicago, Illinois. It was also speculated that it would feature the return of CM Punk, as the United Center is where Punk had made his AEW debut for the second episode of Rampage in August 2021. Since September 2022, Punk had been inactive due to both an injury and also a suspension as a result of the legitimate backstage altercation that occurred during the All Out post-event media scrum. Following the announcement of Collision, however, it was reported that there were still issues regarding Punk's return to AEW, with WBD denying his involvement with the show, but on May 24, 2023, it was reported that the issues had been settled. AEW president Tony Khan then confirmed that the first episode would be held at the United Center, and feature the return of Punk to AEW. Although Punk was brought back to be the centerpiece of the show, he would be fired that September after another legitimate backstage altercation that occurred at All In.

In speaking with the media on May 25 in promotion for AEW's Double or Nothing pay-per-view (PPV) that weekend, Khan clarified that Collision was not part of a new or extended deal with WBD, and instead, it was added on to their current contract, with AEW receiving a monetary increase from WBD for the show. Khan also confirmed that WBD reached out to AEW with the opportunity for another show, and that it was WBD's Chief Executive Officer David Zaslav's idea for there to be more AEW content on TNT. It had also been speculated that with the addition of Collision, AEW would do some form of a roster split, similar to WWE's brand extension, in which half of the roster would perform exclusively on Dynamite while the other half would exclusively appear on Collision. In an appearance on the Barstool Sports Rasslin' podcast with Brandon Walker, on June 13, Khan said that there would not be a hard split where wrestlers would exclusively appear on only one program. Instead, he said some wrestlers would be featured exclusively on certain shows for a certain period of time, but there could be opportunities for storylines to cross between Dynamite and Collision. He also confirmed that all AEW champions would continue to appear on all AEW programming.

On June 16, a day before Collision's debut, Khan confirmed that the show's commentary team would consist of Kevin Kelly and Nigel McGuinness, with Jim Ross occasionally sitting in on main events. On October 14, Tony Schiavone was confirmed to join the commentary team. This remained until March 8, 2024, when Kelly's AEW contract was terminated.

Beginning with the August 5, 2023, episode, Collision airs against WWE's monthly PPV and livestreaming events, which are typically held on Saturdays at 8 p.m ET, starting with SummerSlam. Additionally, due to AEW's pay-per-view Full Gear being held on Saturday, November 18, 2023, that weekend's episode of Collision was instead held the night before on Friday, November 17 at 8 p.m. ET, which put it head-to-head against WWE's Friday night program, SmackDown. AEW would later attempt to avoid counterprogramming against WWE's Saturday PPVs by airing Collision at an earlier time those days. Collision aired live on Friday, September 6 alongside Rampage, a day before All Out and competed again with SmackDown, which held its series finale on Fox. With the return of Saturday Night's Main Event on December 14 airing on NBC and Peacock, Collision goes head-to-head with WWE's revived program when it airs. To avoid counterprogramming against Night 1 of WWE's WrestleMania 41 on Saturday, April 19, 2025, Collision aired live on Thursday, April 17, which was also the second part of the Spring BreakThru special. On March 31, 2025, Dave Meltzer of the Wrestling Observer Newsletter reported that going forward, AEW may continue to move Collision off Saturday nights when WWE is running a Saturday show, noting that AEW and WBD were monitoring the situation.

On occasion, AEW has not taped episodes of Collision due to scheduling conflicts or have moved the shows earlier broadcasts to avoid a conflict with various TNT Sports events. For example, as a result of AEW's PPV event, Worlds End, being held during Collision's Saturday night time slot on December 30, 2023, Collision was not held that week. An episode of Collision was also not held on March 23, 2024, due to the NCAA March Madness coverage occurring that night. Currently, the conflicts are with March Madness (including the Final Four every other year), the National Hockey League Stanley Cup Playoffs, and the NASCAR In-Season Tournament, where the show will air on a different date.

On October 2, 2024, AEW announced a new media rights deal with WBD, wherein AEW's television programs Dynamite and Collision would be simulcast on WBD's streaming service Max and their respective television channels beginning in January 2025. The first broadcast of Collision to simulcast on TNT and Max was on January 4, 2025.

Starting with All Out in September 2025, WBD began selling AEW pay-per-views on Max. As AEW's PPVs between September and December typically take place on Saturdays to avoid counterprogramming the NFL – and specifically, the Khan-owned Jacksonville Jaguars – Collision on pay-per-view weeks is now split into two episodes to fulfil contractual obligations: a one-hour presentation immediately following Dynamite on Wednesday, and Saturday Tailgate Brawl, which airs immediately before the PPV on TNT and Max and serves as the pre-show for the pay-per-view.

== Special episodes ==
=== 2023 ===
Episode	Date	Venue	Location	Rating (18–49)	U.S. viewers (million)	Notes
Debut episode	June 17, 2023	United Center	Chicago, Illinois	0.33	0.816	Series debut, which saw the return of CM Punk to AEW since September 4, 2022, at All Out.: Wardlow (c) vs. Luchasaurus (with Christian Cage) for the AEW TNT Championship; Andrade El Idolo vs. Buddy Matthews (with Julia Hart); Miro vs. Tony Nese (with Mark Sterling); The Outcasts (Ruby Soho and Toni Storm) vs. Skye Blue and Willow Nightingale; Bullet Club Gold (Jay White and Juice Robinson) and Samoa Joe vs. CM Punk and FTR (Cash Wheeler and Dax Harwood)
Fight for the Fallen	August 19, 2023	Rupp Arena	Lexington, Kentucky	0.17	0.412	Part 3 of the fifth annual Fight for the Fallen event.: Jay White vs. Dalton Castle; Bullet Club Gold (Austin Gunn, Colten Gunn, and Juice Robinson) vs. Iron Savages (Jacked Jameson, Bronson, and Boulder); Big Bill vs. Derek Neal; Willow Nightingale vs. Diamanté; Powerhouse Hobbs vs. Kevin Ku; Darby Allin vs. Christian Cage
Fyter Fest	August 26, 2023	Gas South Arena	Duluth, Georgia	0.16	0.552	Part 3 of the fifth annual Fyter Fest event.: Orange Cassidy, Penta El Zero Miedo, and Eddie Kingston vs. Kip Sabian, The Blade, and The Butcher; The Dark Order (Alex Reynolds and John Silver) vs. Action Andretti and Darius Martin; Big Bill vs. Vary Morales; Willow Nightingale vs. Robyn Renegade; Keith Lee vs. Zicky Dice; Darby Allin, Sting, Hook, and CM Punk vs. Mogul Embassy (Brian Cage and Swerve Strickland), Jay White, and Luchasaurus in an All In All Star match
Friday Night Collision	November 17, 2023	Kia Forum	Los Angeles, California	0.09	0.270	Friday airing of Collision due to AEW's pay-per-view Full Gear taking place on Saturday.: Miro vs. Daniel Garcia; Kings of the Black Throne (Brody King and Malakai Black) vs. The Boys (Brandon Tate and Brent Tate); Brian Cage vs. Komander vs. Penta El Zero Miedo vs. Trent Beretta for a AEW TNT Championship match later that night on Rampage; Wardlow vs. Evan Daniels; Rush vs. Dax Harwood; Buddy Matthews vs. Wheeler Yuta; The Outcasts (Saraya and Ruby Soho) vs. Hikaru Shida and Kris Statlander
Winter Is Coming	December 16, 2023	Curtis Culwell Center	Garland, Texas	0.15	0.457	Part 3 of the fourth annual Winter Is Coming event.: Claudio Castagnoli vs. Andrade El Idolo in an AEW Continental Classic Blue League match; Abadon vs. Jazmin Allure; Orange Cassidy (c) vs. Bryan Keith for the AEW International Championship; Kris Statlander and Willow Nightingale vs. Mercedes Martinez and Diamante in a Texas Street Fight; Brian Cage vs. Kari Wright; Eddie Kingston vs. Daniel Garcia in an AEW Continental Classic Blue League match; Bryan Danielson vs. Brody King in an AEW Continental Classic Blue League match
Holiday Bash	December 23, 2023	Frost Bank Center	San Antonio, Texas	0.16	0.489	Part 3 of the fourth annual Holiday Bash event.: Bryan Danielson vs. Claudio Castagnoli in an AEW Continental Classic Blue League match; The Acclaimed (Anthony Bowens, Max Caster, and Billy Gunn) (c) vs. Top Flight (Darius Martin and Dante Martin) and Action Andretti for the AEW World Trios Championship; Brian Cage vs. Keith Lee; Brody King vs. Daniel Garcia in an AEW Continental Classic Blue League match; Skye Blue and Julia Hart vs. Thunder Rosa and Abadon; Eddie Kingston vs. Andrade El Idolo in an AEW Continental Classic Blue League match

=== 2024 ===
Episode	Date	Venue	Location	Rating (18–49)	U.S. viewers (million)	Notes
Collision's 1 Year Anniversary	June 15, 2024	Covelli Centre	Youngstown, Ohio	0.13	0.431	Celebrated Collision's first anniversary.: Blackpool Combat Club (Bryan Danielson, Claudio Castagnoli, Jon Moxley, and Wheeler Yuta) vs. Lio Rush, Rocky Romero, and TMDK (Mikey Nicholls and Shane Haste); Deonna Purrazzo vs. Thunder Rosa in a no disqualification match; Hechicero vs. Dalton Castle; Dante Martin vs. Lee Moriarty in a Forbidden Door qualifying match; Kyle O'Reilly vs. Anthony Henry; House of Black (Brody King, Buddy Matthews, and Malakai Black) vs. Bang Bang Gang (Austin Gunn, Colten Gunn, and Juice Robinson)
Grand Slam	September 28, 2024	Arthur Ashe Stadium	Queens, New York	0.13	0.435	Part 2 of the fourth annual Grand Slam event. Taped immediately after Dynamite's conclusion on September 25, 2024.: Jamie Hayter vs. Saraya in a "Saraya's Rules match"; The Conglomeration (Mark Briscoe, Kyle O'Reilly and Orange Cassidy) vs. The Learning Tree (Chris Jericho, Big Bill and Bryan Keith) in a tornado trios match; Brody King vs. Action Andretti; Jack Perry (c) vs. Minoru Suzuki for the AEW TNT Championship; Blackpool Combat Club (Pac, Claudio Castagnoli and Wheeler Yuta) (c) vs. Komander and Private Party ("Brother Zay" Isiah Kassidy and Marq Quen) for the AEW World Trios Championship; Hologram vs. The Beast Mortos vs. Dralístico; Jeff Jarrett vs. "Hangman" Adam Page in a Lumberjack Strap match; Kazuchika Okada (c) vs. Sammy Guevara in an AEW Continental Championship eliminator match
Winter Is Coming	December 14, 2024	Chaifetz Arena	St. Louis, Missouri	0.09	0.246	Part 3 of the fifth annual Winter Is Coming event, which was taped on December 12, 2024.: Jamie Hayter vs. Willow Nightingale in an International Women's Cup Qualifier Final; Kazuchika Okada vs. The Beast Mortos in an AEW Continental Classic Blue League match; Toni Storm vs. Shazza McKenzie; Action Andretti and Lio Rush vs. Top Flight (Darius Martin and Dante Martin); Kris Statlander vs. Tootie Lynn; Daniel Garcia, Orange Cassidy, Komander, and The Outrunners (Truth Magnum and Turbo Floyd) vs. MxM Collection (Mason Madden and Mansoor) and The Premier Athletes (Ari Daivari, Josh Woods, and Tony Nese); Kyle Fletcher vs. Mark Briscoe in an AEW Continental Classic Blue League match
Christmas Collision	December 21, 2024	Hammerstein Ballroom	New York City, New York	0.20	0.635	Christmas-themed episode of Collision.: Ricochet vs. Will Ospreay in an AEW Continental Classic Gold League match; Kris Statlander vs. Penelope Ford; Daniel Garcia vs. Shelton Benjamin in an AEW Continental Classic Blue League match; Mark Briscoe vs. The Beast Mortos in an AEW Continental Classic Blue League match; Claudio Castagnoli vs. Darby Allin in an AEW Continental Classic Gold League match

=== 2025 ===
Since the start of AEW Collision simulcasting on HBO Max from the January 4, 2025 episode onward official TV ratings for the show's simulcast on Max has been unavailable.

Episode	Date	Venue	Location	Rating (18–49)	U.S. viewers (million)	Notes
Maximum Carnage	January 18, 2025	Andrew J. Brady Music Center	Cincinnati, Ohio	0.10	0.342	Part 2 of the Maximum Carnage event, which was taped on January 16, 2025.: "Hangman" Adam Page vs. Christopher Daniels in a Texas Death match; The Undisputed Kingdom (Adam Cole, Kyle O'Reilly, and Roderick Strong) vs. Shane Taylor Promotions (Carlie Bravo, Capt. Shawn Dean, and Lee Moriarty); Murder Machines (Brian Cage and Lance Archer) vs. Top Flight (Dante Martin and Darius Martin); Kazuchika Okada (c) vs. Tomohiro Ishii for the AEW Continental Championship; Dustin Rhodes vs. Adam Priest; Julia Hart vs. Harley Cameron; Death Riders (Jon Moxley, Claudio Castagnoli, and Wheeler Yuta) and The Learning Tree (Chris Jericho, Big Bill, and Bryan Keith) vs. Powerhouse Hobbs, The Outrunners (Truth Magnum and Turbo Floyd), and Rated FTR (Dax Harwood, Cash Wheeler, and Cope)
Homecoming	January 25, 2025	Daily's Place	Jacksonville, Florida	0.07	0.250	Fourth Homecoming event.: Samoa Joe vs. Nick Wayne; Kazuchika Okada vs. Komander; Daniel Garcia, Angelo Parker, and Matt Menard vs. The Undisputed Kingdom (Adam Cole, Kyle O'Reilly, and Roderick Strong); Gates of Agony (Bishop Kaun and Toa Liona) vs. Hounds of Hell (Brody King and Buddy Matthews); Deonna Purrazzo vs. Queen Aminata vs. Serena Deeb vs. Yuka Sakazaki to determine the #1 contender for the AEW TBS Championship; Konosuke Takeshita (c) vs. Katsuyori Shibata for the AEW International Championship
Slam Dunk Saturday	March 22, 2025	Liberty First Credit Union Arena	Omaha, Nebraska	0.20	0.554	Aired at 11pm ET due to the 2025 NCAA Division I men's basketball tournament. Taped immediately after Dynamite's conclusion on March 19, 2025.: Daniel Garcia (c) vs. Adam Cole for the AEW TNT Championship; Hook vs. Max Caster; Julia Hart vs. Queen Aminata; The Don Callis Family (Brian Cage, Konosuke Takeshita, and Lance Archer) vs. Mark Briscoe, Powerhouse Hobbs, and Rocky Romero
Slam Dunk Sunday	March 23, 2025	Liberty First Credit Union Arena	Omaha, Nebraska	0.22	0.584	Aired at 11pm ET due to the 2025 NCAA Division I men's basketball tournament. Taped immediately after Dynamite's conclusion on March 19, 2025.: Death Riders (Claudio Castagnoli, Pac, and Wheeler Yuta) (c) vs. AR Fox and Top Flight (Dante Martin and Darius Martin) for the AEW World Trios Championship; Bandido vs. Johnny TV; Harley Cameron vs. Aminah Belmont; Hologram and Komander vs. La Faccion Ingobernable (Dralístico and The Beast Mortos)
Spring BreakThru	April 17, 2025	MGM Music Hall at Fenway	Boston, Massachusetts	0.08	0.353	Part 2 of the Spring BreakThru event. Special live Thursday broadcast, moved from its Saturday night slot because of 2025 Stanley Cup Playoffs coverage (Game 1 of both the St. Louis Blues at Winnipeg Jets and Colorado Avalanche at Dallas Stars first-round series) on TNT.: Kevin Knight vs. Lance Archer; The Don Callis Family (Konosuke Takeshita and Josh Alexander) vs. The Conglomeration (Tomohiro Ishii and Rocky Romero); Megan Bayne vs. Rebecca Scott and Ashley Vox; Adam Cole (c) vs. Claudio Castagnoli for the AEW TNT Championship; La Facción Ingobernable (Rush, Dralístico, and The Beast Mortos) vs. KM, Rosario Grillo, and LSG; Komander (c) vs. Nick Wayne for the ROH World Television Championship; Kris Statlander and Julia Hart vs. Mercedes Moné and Harley Cameron
Playoff Palooza	April 26, 2025	Lakefront Arena	New Orleans, Louisiana	0.21	0.707	Aired at 8:50pm ET due to the 2025 NBA playoffs. Taped immediately after Dynamite's conclusion on April 23, 2025.: Swerve Strickland vs. Blake Christian; "Timeless" Toni Storm vs. Queen Aminata in an AEW Women's World Championship eliminator match; Hologram vs. Max Caster; CRU (Lio Rush and Action Andretti) vs. Top Flight (Dante Martin and Darius Martin) in a tornado tag team match; Anna Jay vs. Taylor Gainey; Bandido (c) vs. Dralístico for the ROH World Championship; Rush vs. AR Fox; FTR (Cash Wheeler and Dax Harwood) vs. The Paragon (Roderick Strong and Kyle O'Reilly)
Beach Break	May 17, 2025	Now Arena	Hoffman Estates, Illinois	0.08	0.398	Part 2 of the fourth Beach Break event. Taped immediately after Dynamite's conclusion on May 14, 2025.: Megan Bayne vs. Anna Jay; Kyle Fletcher vs. AR Fox; Bandido, Brody King, and Tomohiro Ishii vs. The Don Callis Family (Lance Archer, Rocky Romero, and Trent Beretta); "Speedball" Mike Bailey vs. Blake Christian; The Learning Tree (Big Bill and Bryan Keith) vs. Gates of Agony (Bishop Kaun and Toa Liona) in a Chicago Street Fight; The Sons of Texas (Dustin Rhodes and Sammy Guevara) vs. CRU (Action Andretti and Lio Rush) to determine the #1 contenders for the AEW World Tag Team Championship at Double or Nothing; Powerhouse Hobbs vs. Wheeler Yuta
Fyter Fest	June 4, 2025	Mission Ballroom	Denver, Colorado	0.10	0.380	Part 2 of the sixth Fyter Fest event.: Will Ospreay vs. Lio Rush; FTR (Dax Harwood and Cash Wheeler) vs. Templario and Atlantis Jr.; The Don Callis Family (Kyle Fletcher and Konosuke Takeshita) and Hechicero vs. Bandido and The Outrunners (Truth Magnum and Turbo Floyd); Nick Wayne (c) vs. Sammy Guevara vs. AR Fox vs. Lee Johnson for the ROH World Television Championship; Thekla vs. Lady Frost; The Paragon (Adam Cole, Kyle O'Reilly, and Roderick Strong) and Daniel Garcia vs. The Don Callis Family (Josh Alexander, Lance Archer, Trent Beretta, and Rocky Romero)
Summer Blockbuster	June 11, 2025	Theater of the Clouds at Moda Center	Portland, Oregon	0.09	0.397	Part 2 of the Summer Blockbuster event.: Kyle Fletcher vs. Anthony Bowens; "Timeless" Toni Storm vs. Julia Hart; The Conglomeration (Mark Briscoe, Tomohiro Ishii, and Willow Nightingale) vs. MxM Collection (Mansoor and Mason Madden) and Taya Valkyrie in a Mixed trios match; Bandido vs. The Beast Mortos; Thekla vs. Queen Aminata; The Don Callis Family (Hechicero, Josh Alexander, Konosuke Takeshita, and Lance Archer) vs. Daniel Garcia and Paragon (Adam Cole, Kyle O'Reilly, and Roderick Strong)
Collision 100	July 5, 2025	Toyota Arena	Ontario, California	0.10	0.310	Celebrating the show's 100th episode. Was taped immediately after the conclusion of Dynamite 300 on July 2, 2025.: Kevin Knight vs. Nick Wayne vs. Shelton Benjamin; FTR (Cash Wheeler and Dax Harwood) vs. The Outrunners (Truth Magnum and Turbo Floyd); Místico and The Conglomeration (Hologram and Mark Briscoe) vs. The Don Callis Family (Hechicero, Rocky Romero and Trent Beretta); Scorpio Sky vs. Max Caster; Willow Nightingale vs. Vipress; Athena, Julia Hart, Megan Bayne and Thekla vs. Queen Aminata, TayJay (Anna Jay and Tay Melo) and Thunder Rosa; Kyle Fletcher vs. Daniel Garcia to determine the #1 contender for the AEW TNT Championship at All In
September to Remember	September 17, 2025	Canada Life Place	London, Ontario, Canada	0.12	0.535	Part 2 of the September to Remember event.: The conclusion to Thekla vs. Queen Aminata in a No Holds Barred match; JetSpeed (Kevin Knight and "Speedball" Mike Bailey) vs. The Matriarchy (Kip Sabian and Killswitch) to qualify for the AEW World Tag Team Championship match at All Out; Riho vs. Robyn Renegade; The Don Callis Family (Hechicero and Josh Alexander) vs. Top Flight (Dante and Darius Martin) to qualify for the AEW World Tag Team Championship match at All Out
Saturday Tailgate Brawl: All Out	September 20, 2025	Scotiabank Arena	Toronto, Ontario, Canada	0.04	0.184	Also served as the pre-show for the All Out pay-per-view.: The Opps (Samoa Joe and Powerhouse Hobbs) vs. The Workhorsemen (Anthony Henry and JD Drake); Daniel Garcia vs. Katsuyori Shibata; Hologram and Paragon (Roderick Strong and Kyle O'Reilly) vs. The Frat House (Preston Vance, Cole Karter, and Griff Garrison); Harley Cameron, Mina Shirakawa, Queen Aminata and Willow Nightingale vs. Megan Bayne, Penelope Ford and the Sisters of Sin (Julia Hart and Skye Blue) in a Tornado Tailgate Brawl
Homecoming	October 11, 2025	Daily's Place	Jacksonville, Florida	0.06	0.286	Fourth Homecoming event.: Kota Ibushi vs. Josh Alexander; TayJay (Anna Jay and Tay Melo) vs. Dream Girl Ellie and Carolina Cruz; Triangle of Madness (Julia Hart, Skye Blue, and Thekla) vs. Kris Statlander, "Timeless" Toni Storm, and Harley Cameron; La Facción Ingobernable (Rush, Dralístico, and Sammy Guevara) vs. MxM TV (Johnny TV, Mansoor and Mason Madden); Eddie Kingston vs. The Beast Mortos; Top Gods (Megan Bayne, Cash Wheeler and Dax Harwood) vs. Willow Nightingale and JetSpeed ("Speedball" Mike Bailey and Kevin Knight)
Saturday Tailgate Brawl: WrestleDream	October 18, 2025	Chaifetz Arena	St. Louis, Missouri	0.04	0.228	Also served as the pre-show for the WrestleDream pay-per-view.: Death Riders (Claudio Castagnoli, Wheeler Yuta, Pac, and Daniel Garcia) vs. Roderick Strong and The Conglomeration (Orange Cassidy, Kyle O'Reilly, and Tomohiro Ishii); Eddie Kingston and Hook vs. The Frat House (Cole Karter and Griff Garrison); Harley Cameron and Willow Nightingale vs. Divine Vanity (Megan Bayne and Penelope Ford); FTR (Dax Harwood and Cash Wheeler) vs. JetSpeed ("Speedball" Mike Bailey and Kevin Knight)
Fright Night Collision	November 1, 2025	Bert Ogden Arena	Edinburg, Texas	0.03	0.217	Halloween themed episode. Taped immediately after the conclusion of Dynamite on October 29, 2025.: The Don Callis Family (Kazuchika Okada and Konosuke Takeshita) vs. Max Caster and Anthony Bowens; Mercedes Moné vs. Olympia for the CMLL World Women's Championship; Megan Bayne and Marina Shafir vs. Nixon Newell and Miranda Alize; Mark Briscoe, Roderick Strong, and Komander vs. La Facción Ingobernable (Sammy Guevara, Dralístico, and The Beast Mortos); MxM TV (Johnny TV, Mansoor and Mason Madden) vs. Bang Bang Gang (Juice Robinson, Austin Gunn, and Ace Austin); Bandido (c) vs. Máscara Dorada for the ROH World Championship
Thanksgiving Collision	November 27, 2025	The Pinnacle	Nashville, Tennessee	0.06	0.285	Thanksgiving themed episode. Taped immediately after the conclusion of Dynamite on November 26, 2025.: Pac vs. "Speedball" Mike Bailey in a Continental Classic Gold League match; Daniel Garcia vs. "Daddy Magic" Matt Menard; MxM TV (Johnny TV, Mansoor and Mason Madden) vs. Dalton Castle and The Outrunners (Turbo Floyd and Truth Magnum); Eddie Kingston vs. Katsuyori Shibata; Thekla vs. Tay Melo; Roderick Strong vs. Konosuke Takeshita in a Continental Classic Blue League match
Winter Is Coming	December 13, 2025	Utilita Arena Cardiff	Cardiff, Wales			Part 2 of the fifth annual Winter Is Coming event. Aired live immediately after the conclusion of Dynamite on December 13, 2025.: Swerve Strickland vs. Josh Alexander; Kris Statlander and Jamie Hayter vs. Sisters of Sin (Julia Hart and Skye Blue); Konosuke Takeshita vs. Claudio Castagnoli in a Continental Classic Blue League match; Kevin Knight vs. "Speedball" Mike Bailey in a Continental Classic Gold League match; Mark Briscoe (c) vs. Daniel Garcia for the AEW TNT Championship
Holiday Bash	December 17, 2025	Co-op Live	Manchester, England	0.05	0.333	Part 2 of the fifth annual Holiday Bash event. Aired live immediately after the conclusion of Dynamite on December 17, 2025.: Orange Cassidy vs. Máscara Dorada in a Continental Classic Blue League match; Jamie Hayter vs. Isla Dawn; FTR (Dax Harwood and Cash Wheeler) (c) vs. Bang Bang Gang (Juice Robinson and Austin Gunn) for the AEW World Tag Team Championship
Holiday Bash	December 20, 2025	Co-op Live	Manchester, England			Part 3 of the fifth annual Holiday Bash event. Taped immediately after the conclusion of Collision on December 17, 2025.: "Speedball" Mike Bailey vs. "Jungle" Jack Perry in a Continental Classic Gold League match; Eddie Kingston vs. Nathan Cruz; Mercedes Moné (c) vs. Alex Windsor for the Undisputed British Women's Championship; Kazuchika Okada vs. Kevin Knight in a Continental Classic Gold League match

=== 2026 ===
Episode	Date	Venue	Location	Rating (18–49)	U.S. viewers (million)	Notes
Maximum Carnage	January 17, 2026	Arizona Financial Theatre	Phoenix, Arizona	0.07	0.492	Part 2 of the second annual Maximum Carnage event. Taped immediately after the conclusion of Dynamite on January 14, 2026.: Andrade El Ídolo vs. Angélico; Eddie Kingston and Ortiz vs. Grizzled Young Veterans (James Drake and Zack Gibson); Marina Shafir vs. Zayda Steel.; The Don Callis Family (Kyle Fletcher, Josh Alexander, and El Clon) vs. SkyFlight (Scorpio Sky, Dante Martin, and Darius Martin).; "Jungle" Jack Perry vs. Anthony Bowens to determine the #1 contender to the AEW National Championship.; The Opps (Samoa Joe, Katsuyori Shibata, and Powerhouse Hobbs) (c) vs. Jet Set Rodeo ("Hangman" Adam Page, Kevin Knight, and "Speedball" Mike Bailey) for the AEW World Trios Championship.
Slam Dunk Saturday	March 21, 2026	Save Mart Center at Fresno State	Fresno, California	0.10	0.469	Aired after 2026 NCAA Division I men's basketball tournament. Taped immediately after Dynamite's conclusion on March 18, 2026.: Kyle Fletcher (c) vs. Robbie Eagles for the AEW TNT Championship; La Facción Ingobernable (Rush, Dralístico, and The Beast Mortos) vs. Dom Kubrick, Alpha Zo, and Lucas Riley; The Brawling Birds (Jamie Hayter and Alex Windsor) vs. Sisters of Sin (Julia Hart and Skye Blue); Death Riders (Claudio Castagnoli and Daniel Garcia) vs. Komander and Máscara Dorada
Slam Dunk Sunday	March 22, 2026	Save Mart Center at Fresno State	Fresno, California	0.12	0.616	Aired after the 2026 NCAA Division I men's basketball tournament Taped immediately after Dynamite's conclusion on March 18, 2026.: Orange Cassidy and Roderick Strong vs. The Lethal Twist (Jay Lethal and Lee Johnson); Divine Dominion (Megan Bayne and Lena Kross) vs. Vipress and Alex Gracia; Tommaso Ciampa vs. "Blackheart" Lio Rush; Místico and JetSpeed (Kevin Knight and "Speedball" Mike Bailey) (c) vs. Don Callis Family (Konosuke Takeshita, Josh Alexander, and El Clon) for the AEW World Trios Championship
Fairway to Hell	May 9, 2026	SoFi Center	Palm Beach Gardens, Florida	0.05	0.342	"Jungle" Jack Perry (c) vs. Mark Davis for the AEW National Championship; Divine Dominion (Megan Bayne and Lena Kross) (c) vs. Rachel Ley and Ruthie Slay in an AEW Women's World Tag Team Championship five minute challenge eliminator match; "Speedball" Mike Bailey vs. Kiran Grey; Darby Allin (c) vs. Pac in a No Countout match for the AEW World Championship
Summer Blockbuster	June 13, 2026	Andrew J. Brady Music Center	Cincinnati, Ohio	0.04	0.364	Part 2 of the second annual Summer Blockbuster event. Taped on June 11, 2026.: Kenny Omega vs. Bad Dude Tito; The Rascalz (Dezmond Xavier and Zachary Wentz) vs. Austin Atlas and Aaron Atlas; Kevin Knight (c) vs. Myron Reed for the AEW TNT Championship; Athena vs. Tiara James; The Young Bucks (Matt Jackson and Nick Jackson) vs. The Dogs (David Finlay and Clark Connors); Julia Hart vs. Persephone in an AEW TBS Championship Survival of the Fittest qualifying match; "Speedball" Mike Bailey vs. Jake Doyle; Hikaru Shida vs. Zayda Steel in an AEW TBS Championship Survival of the Fittest qualifying match; Death Riders (Jon Moxley, Claudio Castagnoli, Wheeler Yuta, Pac, and Marina Shafir) vs. Shane Taylor Promotions (Shane Taylor, Lee Moriarty, Carlie Bravo, Capt. Shawn Dean, and Trish Adora) in a Cincinnati Street Fight
Andy Williams Memorial Show	September 12, 2026	Springfield, Massachusetts	MassMutual Center	0.06	0.344	A television special honoring the life of "The Butcher" Andy Williams.: Jon Moxley (c) vs. "Speedball" Mike Bailey in an AEW Continental Championship eliminator match; The Rascalz (Zachary Wentz, Myron Reed, and Dezmond Xavier) vs. Aaron Solo, Griff Garrison, and Nick Comoroto; Queen Aminata vs. Mina Shirakawa; Jay White vs. Adam Priest; Bang Bang Gang (Juice Robinson, Austin Gunn, Colten Gunn, and Ace Austin) vs. Pac and The Dogs (David Finlay, Clark Connors, and Gabe Kidd); The Conglomeration (Orange Cassidy, Roderick Strong, and Kyle O'Reilly) vs. The Lethal Twist (Jay Lethal, Blake Christian, and Lee Johnson); 12-man "The Butcher" Battle Royale
Saturday Tailgate Brawl: All Out	September 26, 2026	NOW Arena	Hoffman Estates, Illinois	0.22		Also served as the pre-show for the All Out pay-per-view.: "Jungle" Jack Perry vs. Katsuyori Shibata; Sisters of Sin (Julia Hart and Skye Blue) vs. Queen Aminata and Mina Shirakawa; Bang Bang Gang (Jay White, Austin Gunn, Colten Gunn, and Ace Austin) vs. Death Riders (Daniel Garcia and Wheeler Yuta) and The Dogs (David Finlay and Clark Connors)
Grand Slam France	October 10, 2026	Adidas Arena	Paris, France	0.04Russell, Skylar (October 16, 2026). "AEW Collision Grand Slam France Dips Below 400,000 Viewers On TNT, Key Demo Rating Also Down". Fightful.</ref>	0.372	Part 2 of the ninth Grand Slam event. Taped immediately after Dynamite's conclusion on October 6, 2026.: The Conglomeration (Orange Cassidy, Roderick Strong, Kyle O'Reilly, and Willow Nightingale) vs. Death Riders (Claudio Castagnoli, Wheeler Yuta, Daniel Garcia, and Marina Shafir) in an eight-person mixed tornado tag team match; Jericho vs. Nick Wayne; Lee Moriarty vs. "Speedball" Mike Bailey with the winner qualifying for the Clockwork Carnage match at WrestleDream; Swerve Strickland vs. Carlie Bravo; Andrade El Ídolo (c) vs. Michael Oku for the AEW National Championship; Divine Dominion (Megan Bayne and Lena Kross) vs. Sisters of Sin (Julia Hart and Skye Blue) vs. Wrathlander (Kris Statlander and Harley Cameron to determine the #1 contenders to the AEW Women's World Tag Team Championship at WrestleDream; The Young Bucks (Matt Jackson) and Nick Jackson) (c) vs. The Dogs (David Finlay and Clark Connors) for the AEW World Tag Team Championship
Saturday Tailgate Brawl: WrestleDream	October 17, 2026	Addition Financial Arena	Orlando, Florida (Note: The venue is on the main campus of the University of Central Florida, which has an Orlando mailing address but is located to the east of the city in unincorporated Orange County.)	0.05	0.372	Also served as the pre-show for the WrestleDream pay-per-view.: Sisters of Sin (Julia Hart and Skye Blue) vs. Divine Dominion (Megan Bayne and Lena Kross); The Don Callis Family (Wardlow, Josh Alexander, and Jake Doyle) vs. Rhys Maddox, Alex Breeze, and Papi D; Death Riders (Claudio Castagnoli, Wheeler Yuta, Daniel Garcia, and Gabe Kidd) and The Dogs (David Finlay and Clark Connors) vs. Bang Bang Gang (Jay White, Austin Gunn, and Colten Gunn) and The Conglomeration (Orange Cassidy, Roderick Strong, and Kyle O'Reilly); FTR (Dax Harwood and Cash Wheeler) vs. Motor City Machine Guns (Chris Sabin and Alex Shelley) in Match 1 of a best-of-five series
Chris Jericho's Rock 'N' Wrestling Rager at Sea – Seventh Cruise of a Seventh Cruise	November 7, 2026	Norwegian Jewel	Miami, Florida			Jericho vs. Blake Christian; Motor City Machine Guns (Chris Sabin and Alex Shelley vs. FTR (Dax Harwood and Cash Wheeler) in Match 4 of a best-of-five series; Nick Wayne vs. Marcus Mathers; Death Riders (Jon Moxley, Daniel Garcia, and Gabe Kidd) vs. Shane Taylor Promotions (Shane Taylor, Carlie Bravo, and Capt. Shawn Dean); Persephone vs. Mina Shirakawa; Andrade El Ídolo (c) vs. Tommaso Ciampa for the AEW National Championship

== Roster ==
The wrestlers featured on All Elite Wrestling take part in scripted feuds and storylines. Wrestlers are portrayed as heroes, villains, or less distinguishable characters in scripted events that build tension and culminate in a wrestling match.

The primary commentators for AEW Collision are Tony Schiavone, Nigel McGuinness and Paul Wight. Additional commentary has been provided by Kevin Kelly, Jim Ross, Ian Riccaboni, Excalibur and others since its creation.

Since July 2024, Arkady Aura is Collision's lead ring announcer.

== See also ==
- List of professional wrestling television series
