= Winter Is Coming (2023) =

All Elite Wrestling three-part television special

- Promotional poster for the Dynamite broadcast
- Promotion: All Elite Wrestling
- Date: December 13 and 16, 2023 (aired December 13, 15, and 16, 2023)
- City: Arlington, Texas (Dec. 13); Garland, Texas (Dec. 16)
- Venue: College Park Center (Arlington); Curtis Culwell Center (Garland)
- Attendance: Night 1: 3,659; Night 2: 3,659; Night 3: 3,108

Winter Is Coming chronology
← Previous; 2022	Next → 2024

AEW Dynamite special episodes chronology
← Previous; Title Tuesday	Next → Holiday Bash

AEW Rampage special episodes chronology
← Previous; Grand Slam	Next → Holiday Bash

AEW Collision special episodes chronology
← Previous; Fyter Fest	Next → Holiday Bash

The 2023 Winter Is Coming was the fourth annual Winter Is Coming professional wrestling television special produced by All Elite Wrestling (AEW). The event took place on December 13 and 16, 2023. While the prior three events only aired as a special episode of Wednesday Night Dynamite, the 2023 event expanded Winter Is Coming to a three-part special, also encompassing Friday Night Rampage and Saturday Night Collision. Dynamite aired live on December 13 on TBS and was held at the College Park Center in Arlington, Texas, while Rampage was taped that same night and aired on tape delay on December 15 on TNT. Collision aired live on December 16 on TNT and was held at the Curtis Culwell Center in Garland, Texas, the same location as the 2021 and 2022 events.

A total of 17 matches were contested across the three broadcasts; six aired live on Dynamite with four taped for Rampage, and then seven aired live on Collision. In the main event of the Dynamite broadcast, Jon Moxley defeated Swerve Strickland in a Gold League match of the Continental Classic tournament. The event also saw a special appearance by members of the Von Erich family (Kevin and his sons Marshall and Ross), with Marshall and Ross having their AEW debut match on the Rampage broadcast. In the main event of the Rampage broadcast, Top Flight (Dante Martin and Darius Martin) and Action Andretti defeated Komander, El Hijo del Vikingo, and Penta El Zero Miedo. In the main event of the Collision broadcast, Bryan Danielson defeated Brody King in a Blue League match of the AEW Continental Classic tournament.

== Production ==
Other on-screen personnel
Role	Name
Commentators	Excalibur (both shows)
Commentators	Tony Schiavone (three shows)
Commentators	Taz (Dynamite)
Commentators	Toni Storm (Dynamite, Riho vs. Ruby Soho)
Commentators	Chris Jericho (Rampage)
Commentators	Kevin Kelly (Collision)
Commentators	Nigel McGuinness (Collision)
Commentators	Matt Menard (Collision, Kingston vs. Garcia)
Ring announcers	Justin Roberts (both shows)
Ring announcers	Dasha Gonzalez (Collision)
Referees	Brandon Martinez
Referees	Mike Posey
Referees	Paul Turner
Referees	Stephon Smith
Interviewers	Renee Paquette (both shows)
Interviewers	Lexy Nair (Collision)

=== Background ===
Winter Is Coming is an annual professional wrestling television special held in December by All Elite Wrestling (AEW) since 2020. The title "Winter Is Coming" is derived from Game of Thrones, a television series from HBO, which is part of Warner Bros. Discovery, which also includes AEW broadcast partners TBS and TNT.

On October 4, 2023, it was originally announced that the fourth Winter Is Coming would be held on December 13, 2023, at the College Park Center in Arlington, Texas. From 2020 to 2022, Winter Is Coming only aired as a special episode of Wednesday Night Dynamite. For the 2023 event, it was expanded to a three-part special, also encompassing Friday Night Rampage and Saturday Night Collision. Dynamite aired live on TBS on December 13 with Rampage taped that same night and aired on tape delay on December 15 on TNT. Collision aired live on December 16 on TNT and was held at the Curtis Culwell Center in Garland, Texas, the location of the prior two Winter Is Coming events.

During the December 6 episode of Dynamite, it was announced that Kevin Von Erich and his sons Marshall and Ross, members of the Von Erich family of professional wrestlers from Texas, would be making a special appearance on the Dynamite broadcast of Winter Is Coming, marking their debut appearance in AEW. This came a week before the US theatrical release of the film, The Iron Claw, a biopic about the Von Erich family.

=== Storylines ===
Winter Is Coming featured professional wrestling matches that involved different wrestlers from pre-existing scripted feuds and storylines, written by AEW's writers. Storylines were produced on AEW's weekly television programs, Dynamite, Collision, and Rampage.

== Results ==
=== Night 1 ===
Dynamite (aired live December 13)
No.	Results	Stipulations	Times
1	"Hangman" Adam Page defeated Roderick Strong (with Mike Bennett and Matt Taven) by pinfall	Singles match	14:45
2	Andrade El Idolo defeated Brody King by pinfall	AEW Continental Classic Blue League match	14:45
3	Riho defeated Ruby Soho by pinfall	Singles match	9:30
4	Rush defeated Jay Lethal by submission	AEW Continental Classic Gold League match	4:30
5	Jay White defeated Mark Briscoe by pinfall	AEW Continental Classic Gold League match	11:00
6	Jon Moxley defeated Swerve Strickland by pinfall	AEW Continental Classic Gold League match	16:25

=== Night 2 ===
Rampage (taped December 13, aired December 15)
No.	Results	Stipulations	Times
1	Orange Cassidy and The Von Erichs (Marshall Von Erich and Ross Von Erich) (with Danhausen) defeated Angelo Parker, Matt Menard, and Jake Hager by pinfall	Six-man tag team match	7:30
2	The Don Callis Family (Kyle Fletcher and Powerhouse Hobbs) (with Don Callis) defeated Hunter Grey and Paul Titan by pinfall	Tag team match	1:00
3	Anna Jay defeated Red Velvet by submission	Singles match	8:30
4	Top Flight (Dante Martin and Darius Martin) and Action Andretti defeated Komander, El Hijo del Vikingo, and Penta El Zero Miedo (with Alex Abrahantes) by pinfall	Six-man tag team match	13:00

=== Night 3 ===
Collision (aired live December 16)
No.	Results	Stipulations	Times
1	Claudio Castagnoli defeated Andrade El Idolo by pinfall	AEW Continental Classic Blue League match	15:34
2	Abadon defeated Jazmin Allure by pinfall	Singles match	1:05
3	Orange Cassidy (c) defeated Bryan Keith by pinfall	Singles match for the AEW International Championship	9:30
4	Kris Statlander and Willow Nightingale defeated Mercedes Martinez and Diamante by pinfall	Texas Street Fight	10:30
5	Brian Cage (with Prince Nana) defeated Kari Wright by pinfall	Singles match	1:20
6	Eddie Kingston defeated Daniel Garcia by pinfall	AEW Continental Classic Blue League match	12:12
7	Bryan Danielson defeated Brody King by pinfall	AEW Continental Classic Blue League match	15:12
(c) / – the champion(s) heading into the match
