= Holiday Bash (2021) =

All Elite Wrestling two-part television special

- Promotional poster featuring various AEW wrestlers
- Promotion: All Elite Wrestling
- Date: December 22, 2021 (aired December 22, 2021 and December 25, 2021)
- City: Greensboro, North Carolina
- Venue: Greensboro Coliseum
- Attendance: 5,600

Holiday Bash chronology
← Previous; 2020	Next → 2022

AEW Dynamite special episodes chronology
← Previous; Winter Is Coming	Next → New Year's Smash

AEW Rampage special episodes chronology
← Previous; Grand Slam	Next → New Year's Smash

The 2021 Holiday Bash was the second annual Holiday Bash professional wrestling Christmas television special produced by All Elite Wrestling (AEW). It took place on December 22, 2021, at the Greensboro Coliseum in Greensboro, North Carolina. The two-part event was broadcast on TNT as special episodes of AEW's weekly television programs, Wednesday Night Dynamite and Friday Night Rampage. Dynamite aired live while Rampage aired on tape delay on December 25 at 9pm ET as a special Saturday night episode, which was moved back from its usual Friday night 10pm ET slot because of TNT's traditional holiday marathon showing of A Christmas Story.

The Dynamite broadcast is notable for the AEW debut of Kyle O'Reilly, who previously wrestled on WWE's NXT brand. O'Reilly reunited with Adam Cole and Bobby Fish, the original three members of The Undisputed Era in NXT. It was also the first time that Sting and CM Punk main evented an AEW event; the two teamed with Darby Allin and defeated The Pinnacle (MJF and FTR (Dax Harwood and Cash Wheeler)). In the main event of the Rampage broadcast, Cody Rhodes defeated Sammy Guevara to win the AEW TNT Championship for a record third time.

== Production ==
=== Background ===
In December 2020, All Elite Wrestling (AEW) held a television special titled Holiday Bash, which aired as a special episode of AEW's flagship program, Wednesday Night Dynamite. On December 7, 2021, AEW President Tony Khan confirmed that Holiday Bash would return live on December 22 for Dynamite and an episode of Rampage that would air on tape delay on Christmas Day. The event was scheduled to take place at the Greensboro Coliseum in Greensboro, North Carolina. While Rampage usually airs on Fridays, for the Holiday Bash special, it was pushed back to Saturday night because of TNT's traditional Christmas Eve marathon showing of A Christmas Story.

=== Storylines ===
Holiday Bash featured professional wrestling matches that involved different wrestlers from pre-existing scripted feuds and storylines. Wrestlers portrayed heroes, villains, or less distinguishable characters in scripted events that built tension and culminated in a wrestling match or series of matches. Storylines were produced on AEW's weekly television programs, Dynamite and Rampage, the supplementary online streaming shows, Dark and Elevation, and The Young Bucks' YouTube series Being The Elite.

On December 10, Tony Khan announced that Sting would make his return to the Greensboro Coliseum for Holiday Bash on December 22. Greensboro Coliseum was the location of Sting's first world championship match, which was against Ric Flair at the 1988 Clash of the Champions. Sting and Darby Allin were interviewed by Tony Schiavone backstage on the December 10 episode of Rampage about Sting's return to Greensboro, however, they were interrupted by FTR (Dax Harwood and Cash Wheeler) and their manager Tully Blanchard. On the December 15 episode of Dynamite, MJF faced Dante Martin for the AEW Dynamite Diamond Ring in the main event. After winning the ring for the third year in a row, FTR came out to celebrate with MJF but were attacked by Sting and Allin. CM Punk then came out to even the odds. A six-man tag team match with Punk teaming up with Sting and Allin against The Pinnacle (MJF and FTR) was made official for Holiday Bash.

On the December 8 episode of Dynamite, The Varsity Blondes were interviewed by Tony Schiavone. Arena lights went out and Malakai Black appeared out of nowhere. He blew black mist in Julia Hart's eyes and then disappeared. The following week, Varsity Blondes' Griff Garrison challenged Black to a match which was made official for Holiday Bash.

On October 23, 2021, the AEW TBS Championship Tournament began. On November 17, Nyla Rose defeated Hikaru Shida and on December 1, Ruby Soho defeated Kris Statlander in Quarterfinal matches. Rose and Soho were then scheduled to face each other in the Semifinal match at Holiday Bash with Vickie Guerrero in Rose's corner.

After losing his AEW World Championship to Adam Page at Full Gear, Kenny Omega announced his hiatus on the November 17 episode of Dynamite. After that, Adam Cole teamed up with Omega's The Elite members, The Young Bucks (Matt Jackson and Nick Jackson); they were eventually joined by Bobby Fish. On the December 15 episode, in a backstage segment, Cole announced to his teammates that he had the biggest Christmas gift for them and they would find out what it was at Holiday Bash. Cole was also scheduled for a match against Orange Cassidy on the same night.

On the December 8 episode of Dynamite, Cody Rhodes interrupted Sammy Guevara by answering his AEW TNT Championship open challenge. Guevara accepted and the match was set for the Holiday Bash episode of Rampage. This rivalry goes back to 2019, when Rhodes faced Guevara in the first-ever match on the first-ever episode of Dynamite.

Another match scheduled for the Christmas Day episode of Rampage was Hook against Bear Bronson. Hook made his debut on the December 10 episode of Rampage against Fuego Del Sol.

On December 17, while speaking on the Busted Open Radio podcast with David LaGreca and Mark Henry, Tony Khan announced that AEW would hold the "Owen Hart Cup", which would consist of both a men's and women's tournament. Initial information about the respective tournaments were announced on the December 17 episode of Rampage with more information to be revealed at Holiday Bash.

== Event ==
Other on-screen personnel
Role	Name
Commentators	Excalibur (both shows)
Commentators	Tony Schiavone (Dynamite)
Commentators	Taz (both shows)
Commentators	Eddie Kingston (Elevation)
Commentators	Ricky Starks (Rampage)
Ring announcer	Justin Roberts
Referees	Aubrey Edwards
Referees	Bryce Remsburg
Referees	Paul Turner
Referees	Rick Knox
Interviewer	Mark Henry (Rampage)

=== Dynamite (December 22) ===
==== Preliminary matches ====
The event opened with Orange Cassidy taking on Adam Cole. The Young Bucks and Best Friends also got involved in the match. In the end, Cole won after getting some help from the debuting Kyle O'Reilly. O'Reilly reunited with Adam Cole and Bobby Fish, the original three members of The Undisputed Era in WWE NXT. As they celebrated in the ring, The Young Bucks stood behind them, confused about what just happened.

After the opening match, Tony Schiavone interviewed AEW World Champion Adam Page. They were interrupted by Bryan Danielson, who said that due to their championship match at Winter Is Coming ending in a draw, they would have a rematch for the AEW World Championship in two weeks during the debut broadcast of Dynamite on TBS on January 5, 2022, in Newark, New Jersey. Danielson then stated that he wanted to make sure there was a clear winner this time, so three judges have been selected to decide a winner in the case there was another time limit draw.

Next, Wardlow, who was accompanied by Shawn Spears, defeated Shawn Dean in about one minute.

Right after the match, Dan Lambert appeared in the crowd alongside Ethan Page and Scorpio Sky, talking about how unfair it was that Cody Rhodes was getting an AEW TNT Championship match against Sammy Guevara before one of Lambert's guys.

After that segment, backstage, Dr. Britt Baker, D.M.D. held a Christmas Party with Jamie Hayter and Rebel, while being interviewed about her match at AEW Battle of the Belts by Tony Schiavone.

After that segment, AEW aired special footage of Owen Hart in anticipation of the recently announced Owen Hart Cup.

After that, Ruby Soho faced Nyla Rose, who was accompanied by Vickie Guerrero, in a semifinals match of the AEW TBS Championship tournament. Soho performed a No Future Kick on Nyla Rose to advance to the finals, taking place on the debut episode of Dynamite on TBS on January 5, 2022.

In the penultimate match, Malakai Black faced Griff Garrison, who was accompanied by Brian Pillman Jr.. Black defeated Garrison in just three minutes and after the match, Black attacked Pillman Jr. also.

==== Main event ====
In the main event, Sting made his long-awaited return to the Greensboro Coliseum to team up with CM Punk and Darby Allin to face The Pinnacle (MJF and FTR). Sting's face paint for this match included Punk's cross-armed logo. Punk also wore face paint, similar to Sting's old face paint before he took on the black and white "crow" look; Punk also wore similar ring gear of Sting's from that time. As the match went on, Sting performed several Stinger Splashes on his opponents. Every time MJF and Punk would be tagged-in at the same time, MJF would try to stay away from Punk. At one point, Punk chased MJF through the arena. In the end, Sting, Punk, and Allin defeated MJF and FTR. This match was Sting and Punk's first main event match in AEW.

=== Rampage (December 25) ===
==== Preliminary matches ====
Rampage: Holiday Bash took place on December 22 at the Greensboro Coliseum but did not air until Christmas night. In the opening match, Jungle Boy, who was accompanied by Luchasaurus and Christian Cage defeated Isiah Kassidy, who was accompanied by Marq Quen and Matt Hardy.

Also during the episode, Hook defeated Bear Bronson in his second match. After that match, Kris Statlander, who was accompanied by Orange Cassidy defeated Leyla Hirsch.

==== Main event ====
In the main event of Christmas night Rampage, Cody Rhodes, who was accompanied by Arn Anderson, defeated Sammy Guevara to win his third AEW TNT Championship. Following his victory, Brandi Rhodes, Dustin Rhodes, Brock Anderson and Lee Johnson entered the ring to celebrate with Rhodes. Legendary Jim Crockett Promotions announcer, David Crockett entered the ring to present the championship to Rhodes to close the show.

== Reception ==
=== Television ratings ===
Dynamite averaged 1,020,000 television viewers on TNT, with a 0.37 rating in the key demographic. It was their highest rating since October.

Rampage averaged 589,000 television viewers on TNT, with a 0.26 rating in the key demographic. It was also their highest rating since October.

== Results ==
Dynamite - (December 22) - (Part 1)
No.	Results	Stipulations	Times
1	Adam Cole defeated Orange Cassidy by pinfall	Singles match	17:21
2	Wardlow (with Shawn Spears) defeated Capt. Shawn Dean by pinfall	Singles match	1:12
3	Ruby Soho defeated Nyla Rose (with Vickie Guerrero) by pinfall	Singles match This was a Semifinals match in the AEW TBS Championship tournament.	14:36
4	Malakai Black defeated Griff Garrison (with Brian Pillman Jr.) by submission	Singles match	3:12
5	CM Punk, Sting, and Darby Allin defeated The Pinnacle (MJF and FTR (Dax Harwood and Cash Wheeler)) by pinfall	Six-man tag team match	26:01

Rampage - (December 25) - (Part 2)
No.	Results	Stipulations	Times
1	Jungle Boy (with Luchasaurus and Christian Cage) defeated Isiah Kassidy (with Marq Quen and Matt Hardy) by submission	Singles match	8:55
2	Hook defeated Bear Bronson (with Bear Boulder) by submission	Singles match	3:06
3	Kris Statlander (with Orange Cassidy) defeated Leyla Hirsch by submission	Singles match	6:22
4	Cody Rhodes (with Arn Anderson) defeated Sammy Guevara (c) by pinfall	Singles match for the AEW TNT Championship	15:09
(c) / – the champion(s) heading into the match
