= 2023 Continental Classic =

Professional wrestling tournament

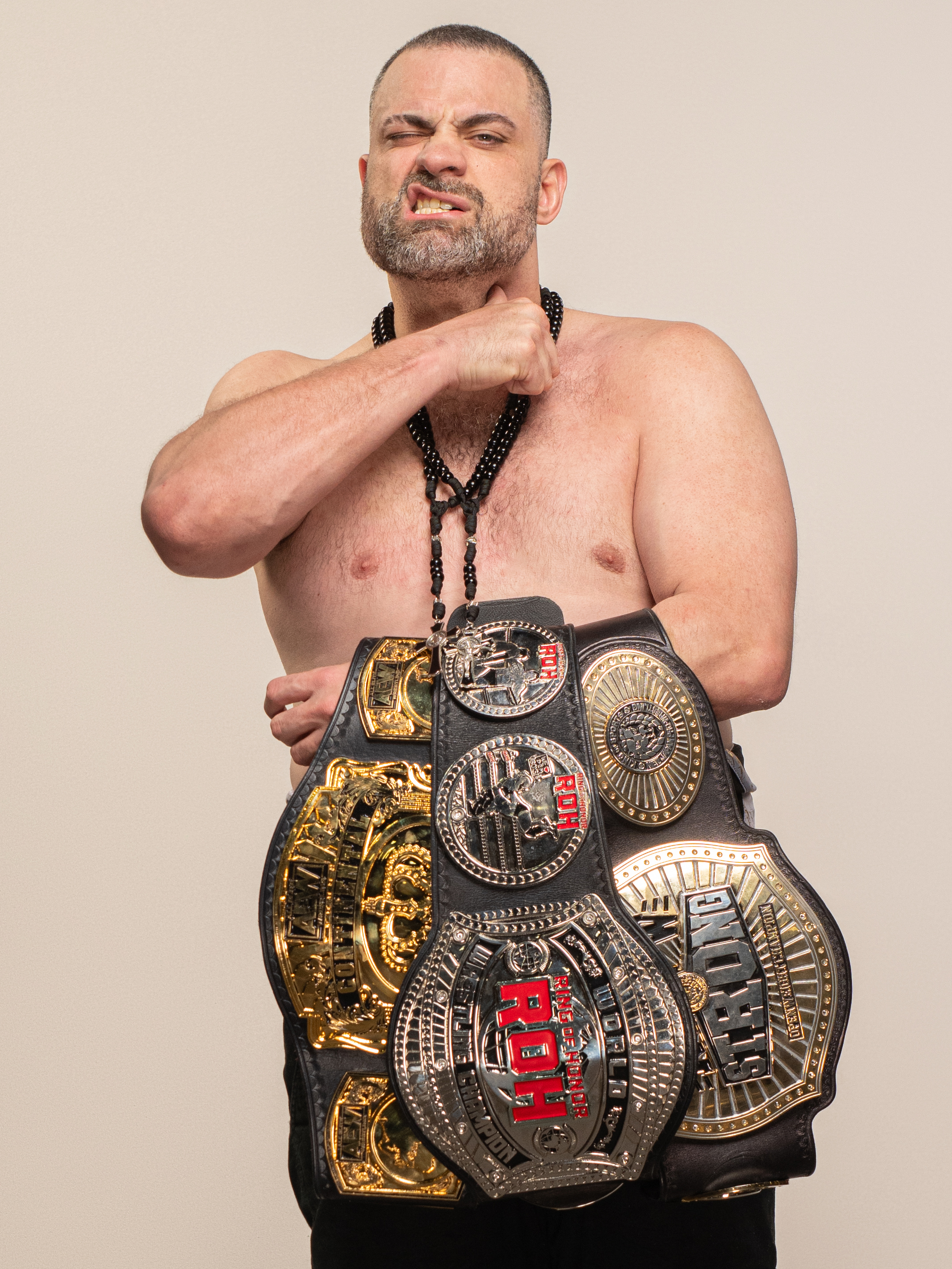
- 2023 Continental Classic winner Eddie Kingston

Tournament information
- Sport: Professional wrestling
- Location: United States; Canada
- Dates: November 22, 2023–December 30, 2023
- Tournament format: Two-block round-robin tournament
- Host: All Elite Wrestling
- Venue: Various arenas (see matches)
- Participants: 12

Final positions
- Champion: Eddie Kingston
- Runner-up: Jon Moxley

The 2023 Continental Classic (C2) was a professional wrestling round-robin tournament hosted by the American promotion All Elite Wrestling (AEW). The inaugural edition of the AEW Continental Classic began on the November 22, 2023, episode of Wednesday Night Dynamite and culminated at the Worlds End pay-per-view (PPV) on December 30, 2023. Tournament matches were held under "Continental Rules", which feature a 20-minute time limit, no one is allowed at ringside, and strictly prohibit outside interference. Eddie Kingston—who also defended the ROH World Championship and NJPW Strong Openweight Championship in the tournament—won the tournament by defeating Jon Moxley in the final, and was crowned the first-ever AEW Continental Champion, as well as the first-ever AEW American Triple Crown Champion for holding all three titles, also referred to as the Continental Crown Champion.

== History ==
On November 11, 2023, the American professional wrestling promotion All Elite Wrestling (AEW) announced a tournament called the Continental Classic (C2). AEW president Tony Khan and AEW wrestler Bryan Danielson announced that the tournament would begin on the November 22, 2023, episode of Dynamite, lasting six weeks and concluding at the Worlds End pay-per-view (PPV) event on December 30.

The Continental Classic was announced to be a round-robin tournament consisting of two groups of six wrestlers. The first four confirmed participants were Bryan Danielson, Andrade El Idolo, Mark Briscoe, and Eddie Kingston. A week later, AEW unveiled the AEW Continental Championship as a prize for the tournament winner, and announced that Kingston would also put his ROH World Championship and his NJPW Strong Openweight Championship on the line; the winner of the tournament would hence be declared the first American Triple Crown Champion, also referred to as the Continental Crown. Khan also announced that the incumbent Continental Champion at the time of future editions of the tournament would be given automatic entry to defend their title.

The inaugural tournament's matches were scheduled to be held across episodes of Dynamite, Rampage, and Collision, with the semi-finals (promoted as the "League Finals") held on December 27 at Dynamite: New Year's Smash and the tournament final (promoted as the "Championship Final") held at the Worlds End PPV. All 12 participants and their groupings in the inaugural Continental Classic were revealed during the "Selection Special" midday on November 22 across AEW's social media. The two blocks were named the Gold and Blue Leagues, with the Gold League matches beginning that night on Dynamite. During the tournament's final week, it was given the secondary branding of "Tournament For Tots", in conjunction with AEW and their action figure manufacturer partner Jazwares's donation of US$1 million worth of toys for the Toys for Tots charity for underprivileged children.

== Overview ==
The Continental Classic is an annual tournament that starts after the promotion's Full Gear PPV event in mid-November and ends at the Worlds End PPV at the end of December. The tournament takes place in a round-robin format, with two blocks of six wrestlers – titled the Blue and Gold Leagues – wrestling each other across AEW's television shows, Dynamite, Rampage, and Collision. Matches are held under "Continental Rules": each match has 20-minute time limit, no other wrestlers are allowed at ringside, and outside interference is strictly prohibited under threat of penalty.

Similar to most soccer leagues, match winners obtain three points for a win, and drawn matches give one point to each participant. After the round-robin phase, the top two wrestlers in each league qualify for a league final match, with ties for position broken based on head-to-head record. The winner of each league final match then face each other for the AEW Continental Championship at Worlds End.

Eddie Kingston was the incumbent ROH World Champion and NJPW Strong Openweight Champion heading in to the tournament; he put these championships on the line as a tournament prize, with the winner to be recognised as the American Triple Crown Champion, also referred to as the Continental Crown. When the tournament was announced, Andrade El Idolo, Mark Briscoe, and Bryan Danielson were also announced as participants. The other eight participants and the league draw were announced in a "Selection Special" presentation in the afternoon preceding the first matches: Andrade, Danielson, Kingston, Claudio Castagnoli, Daniel Garcia, and Brody King in the Blue League, and Briscoe, Jay Lethal, Jon Moxley, Rush, Swerve Strickland, and Jay White in the Gold League.

== Matches ==
Legend
Gold League match
Blue League match
Tournament final match

Tournament matches
Dates	Show	Venue	Matches		Time
November 22	Dynamite	Wintrust Arena; Chicago, Illinois	G	Swerve Strickland defeated Jay Lethal by pinfall	13:51
November 22	Dynamite	Wintrust Arena; Chicago, Illinois	G	Jay White defeated Rush by pinfall	13:53
November 22	Dynamite	Wintrust Arena; Chicago, Illinois	G	Jon Moxley defeated Mark Briscoe by pinfall	11:29
November 25	Collision	Petersen Events Center; Pittsburgh, Pennsylvania	B	Claudio Castagnoli defeated Daniel Garcia by pinfall	10:27
November 25	Collision	Petersen Events Center; Pittsburgh, Pennsylvania	B	Brody King defeated Eddie Kingston by pinfall	16:41
November 29	Dynamite	Target Center; Minneapolis, Minnesota	G	Jon Moxley defeated Jay Lethal by submission	11:19
November 29	Dynamite	Target Center; Minneapolis, Minnesota	G	Rush defeated Mark Briscoe by pinfall	11:25
November 29	Dynamite	Target Center; Minneapolis, Minnesota	G	Swerve Strickland defeated Jay White by pinfall	15:27
December 2	Collision	Erie Insurance Arena; Erie, Pennsylvania	B	Brody King defeated Claudio Castagnoli by pinfall	12:35
December 2	Collision	Erie Insurance Arena; Erie, Pennsylvania	B	Andrade El Idolo defeated Daniel Garcia by pinfall	11:01
December 2	Collision	Erie Insurance Arena; Erie, Pennsylvania	B	Bryan Danielson defeated Eddie Kingston by pinfall	16:50
December 5	Collision (aired December 9)	Bell Centre; Montreal, Quebec, Canada	B	Eddie Kingston defeated Claudio Castagnoli by pinfall	18:04
December 5	Collision (aired December 9)	Bell Centre; Montreal, Quebec, Canada	B	Andrade El Idolo defeated Bryan Danielson by pinfall	18:33
December 6	Dynamite	Bell Centre; Montreal, Quebec, Canada	G	Jon Moxley defeated Rush by technical submission	14:32
December 6	Dynamite	Bell Centre; Montreal, Quebec, Canada	G	Swerve Strickland defeated Mark Briscoe by pinfall	15:44
December 6	Dynamite	Bell Centre; Montreal, Quebec, Canada	G	Jay White defeated Jay Lethal by pinfall	11:24
December 6	Rampage (aired December 8)	Bell Centre; Montreal, Quebec, Canada	B	Bryan Danielson defeated Daniel Garcia by technical submission	15:35
December 13	Dynamite: Winter Is Coming	College Park Center; Arlington, Texas	B	Andrade El Idolo defeated Brody King by pinfall	14:45
December 13	Dynamite: Winter Is Coming	College Park Center; Arlington, Texas	G	Rush defeated Jay Lethal by submission	4:30
December 13	Dynamite: Winter Is Coming	College Park Center; Arlington, Texas	G	Jay White defeated Mark Briscoe by pinfall	11:19
December 13	Dynamite: Winter Is Coming	College Park Center; Arlington, Texas	G	Jon Moxley defeated Swerve Strickland by pinfall	16:23
December 16	Collision: Winter Is Coming	Curtis Culwell Center; Garland, Texas	B	Claudio Castagnoli defeated Andrade El Idolo by pinfall	15:33
December 16	Collision: Winter Is Coming	Curtis Culwell Center; Garland, Texas	B	Eddie Kingston defeated Daniel Garcia by pinfall	12:12
December 16	Collision: Winter Is Coming	Curtis Culwell Center; Garland, Texas	B	Bryan Danielson defeated Brody King by pinfall	15:11
December 20	Dynamite: Holiday Bash	Paycom Center; Oklahoma City, Oklahoma	G	Swerve Strickland defeated Rush by pinfall	14:53
December 20	Dynamite: Holiday Bash	Paycom Center; Oklahoma City, Oklahoma	G	Mark Briscoe defeated Jay Lethal by pinfall	13:53
December 20	Dynamite: Holiday Bash	Paycom Center; Oklahoma City, Oklahoma	G	Jay White defeated Jon Moxley by pinfall	15:09
December 23	Collision: Holiday Bash	Frost Bank Center; San Antonio, Texas	B	Claudio Castagnoli vs. Bryan Danielson went to a time-limit draw	20:00
December 23	Collision: Holiday Bash	Frost Bank Center; San Antonio, Texas	B	Daniel Garcia defeated Brody King by pinfall	10:21
December 23	Collision: Holiday Bash	Frost Bank Center; San Antonio, Texas	B	Eddie Kingston defeated Andrade El Idolo by pinfall	15:39
December 27	Dynamite: New Year's Smash	Addition Financial Arena; Orlando, Florida	G	Jon Moxley defeated Swerve Strickland and Jay White by pinfall	23:14
December 27	Dynamite: New Year's Smash	Addition Financial Arena; Orlando, Florida	B	Eddie Kingston defeated Bryan Danielson by pinfall	22:37
December 30	Worlds End	Nassau Veterans Memorial Coliseum; Uniondale, New York	F	Eddie Kingston defeated Jon Moxley by pinfall	17:16

== Leagues ==
Legend
Qualified to league final

Participants
Blue League		Gold League	
Bryan Danielson	10	Jon Moxley	12
Eddie Kingston (Note: Kingston advanced to the Blue League final due to his head-to-head victory over Andrade.)	9	Swerve Strickland	12
Andrade El Idolo	9	Jay White	12
Claudio Castagnoli	7	Rush	6
Brody King	6	Mark Briscoe	3
Daniel Garcia	3	Jay Lethal	0

Tournament overview
Blue League	Andrade	Castagnoli	Danielson	Garcia	King	Kingston
Andrade	—N/a	Castagnoli (15:33)	Andrade (18:33)	Andrade (11:02)	Andrade (14:45)	Kingston (15:39)
Castagnoli	Castagnoli (15:33)	—N/a	Draw (20:00)	Castagnoli (10:27)	King (12:34)	Kingston (18:04)
Danielson	Andrade (18:33)	Draw (20:00)	—N/a	Danielson (15:35)	Danielson (15:11)	Danielson (16:50)
Garcia	Andrade (11:02)	Castagnoli (10:27)	Danielson (15:35)	—N/a	Garcia (10:21)	Kingston (12:12)
King	Andrade (14:45)	King (12:34)	Danielson (15:11)	Garcia (10:21)	—N/a	King (16:41)
Kingston	Kingston (15:39)	Kingston (18:04)	Danielson (16:50)	Kingston (12:12)	King (16:41)	—N/a
Gold League	Briscoe	Lethal	Moxley	Rush	Strickland	White
Briscoe	—N/a	Briscoe (13:53)	Moxley (11:29)	Rush (11:25)	Strickland (15:44)	White (11:19)
Lethal	Briscoe (13:53)	—N/a	Moxley (11:19)	Rush (4:30)	Strickland (13:51)	White (11:24)
Moxley	Moxley (11:29)	Moxley (11:19)	—N/a	Moxley (14:32)	Moxley (16:23)	White (15:09)
Rush	Rush (11:25)	Rush (4:30)	Moxley (14:32)	—N/a	Strickland (14:53)	White (13:53)
Strickland	Strickland (15:44)	Strickland (13:51)	Moxley (16:23)	Strickland (14:53)	—N/a	Strickland (15:27)
White	White (11:19)	White (11:24)	White (15:09)	White (13:53)	Strickland (15:27)	—N/a

League Finals; Dynamite: New Year's Smash (December 27)
Bryan Danielson	22:37
Eddie Kingston	Pin
Jon Moxley	Pin
Swerve Strickland Jay White	— 23:14

Championship Final; Worlds End (December 30)
Blue	Eddie Kingston	Pin
Gold	Jon Moxley	17:16

== See also ==
- List of All Elite Wrestling tournaments
