= Holiday Bash (2020) =

All Elite Wrestling television special

- Promotional poster
- Promotion: All Elite Wrestling
- Date: December 17, 2020 (aired December 23, 2020)
- City: Jacksonville, Florida
- Venue: Daily's Place

Holiday Bash chronology
| ← Previous; First | Next → 2021 |

AEW Dynamite special episodes chronology
| ← Previous; Winter Is Coming | Next → Brodie Lee Celebration of Life |

The 2020 Holiday Bash was the inaugural Holiday Bash professional wrestling Christmas television special produced by All Elite Wrestling (AEW). The event took place at Daily's Place in Jacksonville, Florida on December 17, 2020, and aired on tape delay on December 23. It was broadcast on TNT as a special episode of AEW's weekly television program, Dynamite. It aired immediately following the NBA on TNT broadcast of the Celtics vs Bucks game.

== Production ==
=== Background ===
On December 9, 2020, All Elite Wrestling (AEW) announced that the December 23 episode of their flagship television program, Dynamite, would be a special episode titled Holiday Bash. The Christmas television special was taped on December 17 at Daily's Place in Jacksonville, Florida due to the ongoing COVID-19 pandemic. TNT aired the Boston Celtics vs. Milwaukee Bucks National Basketball Association game prior to Dynamite's normal 8pm Eastern Time (ET) slot; however, with the expectation that the game would go past 8pm, Holiday Bash was scheduled to air immediately following the game's conclusion.

=== Storylines ===
Holiday Bash featured professional wrestling matches that involved different wrestlers from pre-existing scripted feuds and storylines. Wrestlers portrayed heroes, villains, or less distinguishable characters in scripted events that built tension and culminated in a wrestling match or series of matches. Storylines were produced on AEW's weekly television program, Dynamite, the supplementary online streaming show, Dark, and The Young Bucks' YouTube series Being The Elite.

== Aftermath ==
A second Holiday Bash was held the following year, thus establishing Holiday Bash as an annual Christmas television special for AEW. Additionally, the second event expanded the special to a two-part event, with the first part airing as Dynamite and the second part airing as the same week's episode of Rampage, a second weekly program that began airing in August 2021.

== Results ==
| No. | Results | Stipulations | Times |
|---|---|---|---|
| 1 | The Inner Circle (Chris Jericho and MJF) (with Jake Hager) defeated Top Flight (Darius Martin and Dante Martin) | Tag Team match | 11:46 |
| 2 | Jurassic Express (Jungle Boy, Luchasaurus and Marko Stunt) defeated The Dark Order (Alan "5" Angels, Preston "10" Vance and Colt Cabana) | Six-man Tag Team Match | 10:28 |
| 3 | PAC (with Penta El Zero Miedo) defeated The Butcher (with The Blade and The Bunny) | Singles match | 11:49 |
| 4 | Dustin Rhodes (with Lee Johnson) defeated Evil Uno (with Stu Grayson) | Singles match | 8:27 |
| 5 | Hikaru Shida defeated Alex Gracia | Singles match | 3:33 |
| 6 | The Young Bucks (Matt Jackson and Nick Jackson) (c) defeated The Acclaimed (Anthony Bowens and Max Caster) | Tag Team match for the AEW World Tag Team Championship | 14:47 |
(c) / – the champion(s) heading into the match

== See also ==
- 2020 in professional wrestling
