= Paul Turner (referee) =

American professional wrestling referee

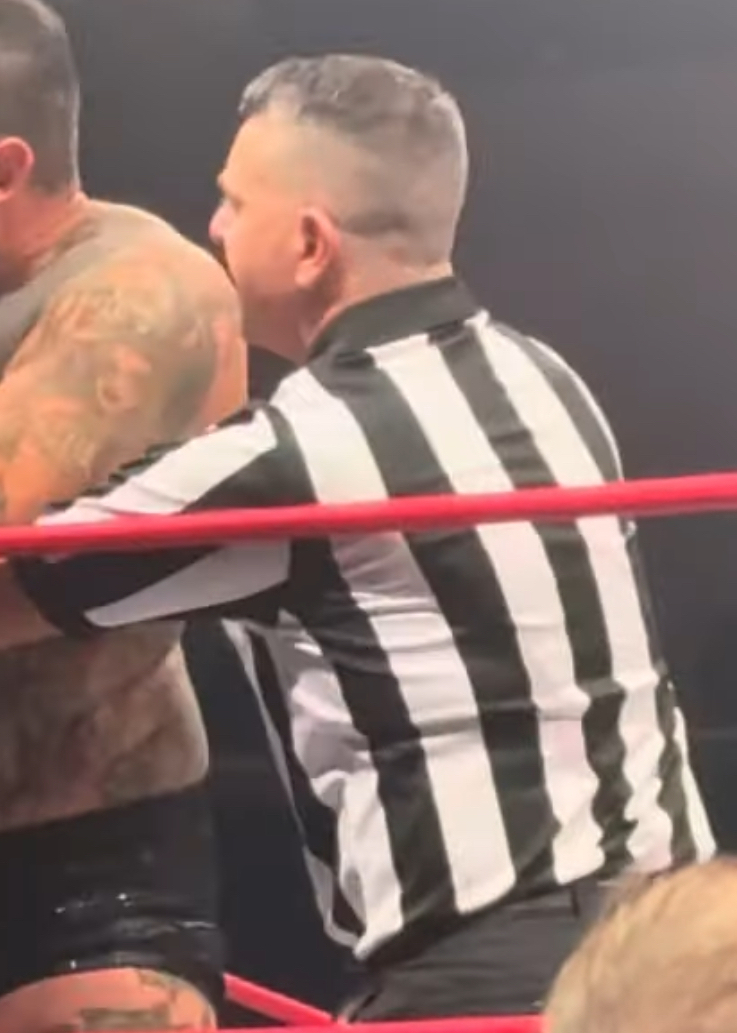
- Turner at Winter is Coming in 2023

Personal information
- Born: Lancaster, Pennsylvania, U.S.

Professional wrestling career
- Ring name: Paul Turner
- Debut: 1998

Paul Turner is an American professional wrestling referee signed to All Elite Wrestling (AEW), and has previously worked for New Japan Pro Wrestling and Ring of Honor.

== Career ==
Turner began his career in 1998 on the independent circuit in Pennsylvania. He made his Ring of Honor debut in 2002 at All Star Extravaganza. On September 1, 2018, he refereed at the All In event that led to the creation of All Elite Wrestling. He has continued as a referee for All Elite Wrestling since the inaugural pay-per-view Double or Nothing on May 25, 2019.

On September 22, 2022, Tony Khan congratulated Turner on refereeing 100 AEW events.
