= AEW Dark =

Professional wrestling streaming television program

- AEW Dark logo
- Genre: Professional wrestling
- Created by: Tony Khan
- Starring: AEW roster
- Opening theme: "Facedown" by Mikey Rukus (November 17, 2020 – April 25, 2023) "Falling From Grace" by No One Hero (October 8, 2019 – November 10, 2020)
- Country of origin: United States
- Original language: English
- No. of seasons: 3
- No. of episodes: 194 (list of episodes)

Production
- Camera setup: Multicamera setup
- Running time: 60–120 minutes
- Production company: All Elite Wrestling

Original release
- Network: YouTube
- Release: October 8, 2019 – December 16, 2025

Related
- AEW Dynamite; AEW Collision; AEW Rampage; AEW Battle of the Belts; AEW Dark: Elevation; Ring of Honor Wrestling

AEW Dark, or simply Dark, is an American professional wrestling streaming television program that was produced by the American promotion All Elite Wrestling (AEW), running from October 8, 2019, to April 25, 2023, on AEW's YouTube channel. The show was originally hosted by Tony Schiavone and Dasha Gonzalez in a studio called the "AEW Control Center". Both Dark and its spin-off, Elevation, were canceled due to the addition of AEW's weekly television program, Collision. The program made a one-night return for a special holiday episode on December 16, 2025, titled "Stocking Stuffer".

The program featured matches taped either before or after the preceding episode of Rampage (if it was live), a pay-per-view, or at Soundstage 21 in Universal Studios Florida, which served as the main location for the tapings of Dark's weekly episodes. Prior to this, it was taped before and after the preceding episode of AEW's flagship program, Dynamite, and had featured segments highlighting the previous week's Dynamite and interviews with AEW personalities.

== History ==
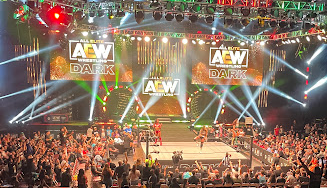
Old stage for Dark from 2019 to 2022

On October 2, 2019, All Elite Wrestling's (AEW) flagship professional wrestling television program, Dynamite, premiered on TNT. During the event, there were four dark matches, two before and two after the live broadcast. During the media scrum following this event, AEW President and Chief Executive Officer Tony Khan stated that the dark matches would become available to view on video in some form. On October 5, then-AEW Executive Vice President and wrestler Cody Rhodes announced a sister program to Dynamite called AEW Dark, which would be the home of AEW's dark matches. On October 8, the program began airing on Tuesdays at 8pm Eastern Time (ET) on AEW's YouTube channel. During the week of a pay-per-view (PPV), however, Dark would air on Friday as the go-home show; this continued until May 2021 for that year's Double or Nothing PPV. Unlike the dark matches of other wrestling promotions, which generally do not affect storylines, these matches on Dark were part of AEW's storylines and counted towards the wrestlers' match statistics.

During the November 5 episode, Tony Schiavone announced AEW Spanish commentator Dasha Gonzalez would be his co-host going forward. Schiavone and Gonzalez hosted segments on Dark from the "AEW Control Center," highlighting matches and storylines within AEW. On December 31, AEW aired a special episode called AEW Dark – 2019 Year in Review, featuring highlights of the show from the past year.

On February 24, 2021, AEW announced that a new spinoff of Dark would premiere on Monday, March 15 titled Dark: Elevation. This was the promotion's third program, after Dynamite and Dark, and aired on Monday nights at 7pm ET, also on AEW's YouTube channel. With the premiere of Rampage in August 2021, Khan said that Dynamite and Rampage would be AEW's core properties, while their YouTube shows, Dark and Elevation, would be their peripheral properties, essentially their developmental shows. With Rampage airing in the 10pm ET slot on Fridays, it replaced Dark as the go-home show for pay-per-views.

On August 27, 2021, it was revealed that Dark would begin being taped at its own set within Universal Studios in Orlando, Florida at Soundstage 21—the same studio which previously hosted weekly episodes of TNA Impact!—while Elevation would continue to be taped in conjunction with Dynamite. The first set of tapings for Dark at Universal Studios occurred on September 11, 2021. AEW taped Dark episodes about once a month, recording four shows per taping with each show lasting about 90 minutes. During the weeks that Rampage or Battle of the Belts aired live, AEW taped Dark in conjunction with that program. AEW had also occasionally taped Dark in conjunction with Elevation, notably in December 2021.

Dark aired its last episode on April 25, 2023. Both it and Elevation were canceled in preparation for the addition of AEW's television program, Collision, which premiered on TNT in June 2023. This was due to an amended deal with AEW's broadcast partner Warner Bros. Discovery (WBD), in which all of AEW's programs would air exclusively on WBD's channels. It was also reported that Rampage would begin showcasing younger wrestlers, essentially becoming what Dark and Elevation were for the company.

In an interview with Iridian Fierro in July 2025, Khan stated that he was open to bringing back Dark and/or Elevation, but it would have to align with AEW's media strategy and television partnerships. He also said it would have to make sense to bring either back, but the ultimate decision was with WBD. While in Cardiff, Wales on December 13 that year for the live special of Collision: Winter Is Coming, Khan announced a one-night only return of Dark for a special titled "Stocking Stuffer". Three matches were taped that day for the special that streamed on YouTube on December 16.
