= Dasha Gonzalez =

American fitness model

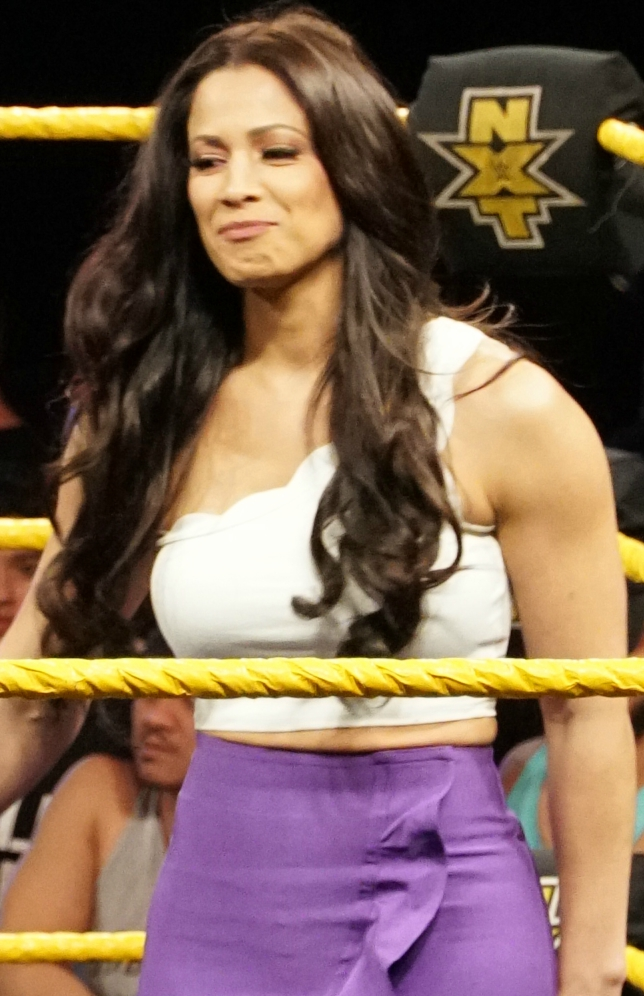
- Gonzalez in April 2018

Personal information
- Born: Dasha Janis González; April 17, 1988 (age 38) Orlando, Florida, U.S.
- Education: University of Central Florida (BS)
- Spouse: Gabe Kuret (m. 2014)

Professional wrestling career
- Ring name(s): Dasha; Dasha Fuentes; Dasha Gonzalez; Dasha Kuret
- Billed height: 5 ft 3 in (160 cm)
- Billed from: Orlando, Florida
- Trained by: WWE Performance Center
- Debut: April 2015

Dasha Janis Kuret (née González; born April 17, 1988) is an American fitness model, professional wrestler, and ring announcer. She is also known for her time as a backstage interviewer and ring announcer in WWE under the ring name Dasha Fuentes and All Elite Wrestling (AEW) under the ring name Dasha Gonzalez.

== Early life and career ==
Gonzalez was born and raised in Orlando, Florida and later attended the University of Central Florida (UCF), where she studied health sciences, microbiology, and molecular biology, graduating in 2012. She worked at LA Fitness and at the beauty retail store Ulta Beauty. Gonzalez also competed in the Miss America organization, winning several titles including Miss UCF and Miss Volusia County. Gonzalez was active in swimming, diving, and gymnastics until a knee injury sustained in the summer of 2014 forced her to be sidelined.

== Professional wrestling career ==
=== WWE (2014–2019) ===
Dasha signed a contract with WWE in 2014 and was assigned to their developmental territory NXT in May, where she was given the ring name Dasha Fuentes. Fuentes debuted in a NXT live event in April 2015, teaming with Dana Brooke and Becky Lynch in a losing effort to Carmella, Alexa Bliss and Devin Taylor. In mid 2015, Dasha began appearing as a backstage interviewer on NXT. Fuentes appeared at the NXT TakeOver: Unstoppable event on May 20, as part of Tyler Breeze's entrance. On April 9, 2019, Fuentes was released from WWE.

=== Independent circuit (2019) ===
In October 2019, Gonzalez competed in a singles match against Renee Michelle as part of Great Lakes Championship Wrestling's Blizzard Brawl Event, where she was victorious.

=== All Elite Wrestling (2019–2024) ===
On August 31, 2019, Gonzalez was part of the Spanish announcers for All Elite Wrestling's inaugural All Out (2019) PPV. In October 2019, Gonzalez made her debut as a Spanish commentator for the AEW program Dark. On November 4, 2019, during AEW Dark, Gonzalez appeared alongside host Tony Schiavone and was later revealed to be joining the program as Schiavone's co-host. On the November 27 episode of AEW Dynamite, Gonzalez took Justin Roberts' place as the event's ring announcer after Roberts was (kayfabe) attacked earlier in the night. On the August 10, 2020, episode of the AEW Women’s Tag Team tournament, she made her in-ring debut teaming with Rachael Ellering in a losing effort to Ivelisse and Diamanté. On April 1, 2024, Dasha Kuret was released from AEW.

== Other media ==
In 2020, Gonzalez competed during the second season of the sports competition series The Titan Games.
