= Baillargeon =

Baillargeon is a surname. Notable people with the surname include:

- Annie Baillargeon (born 1978), Canadian artist
- Charles-François Baillargeon (1798–1870), Canadian Roman Catholic priest and archbishop
- David Baillargeon (born 1996), Canadian squash player
- Émile Charles Baillargeon-Laberge (born 1990), Canadian professional wrestler
- Hélène Baillargeon, (1916–1997), Canadian singer, actor and folklorist
- Joel Baillargeon (born 1964), Canadian ice hockey left winger
- Luce Baillargeon (born 1977), Canadian judoka
- Pascal Baillargeon (born 1986), Canadian football offensive lineman
- Paul Baillargeon (born 1943), Canadian composer, known for his music for television shows
- Paule Baillargeon (born 1945), Canadian actress and film director
- Pierre Baillargeon (politician) (1812–1891), Canadian physician and political figure
- Pierre Baillargeon (1916–1967), Quebec writer and literary critic
- Renée Baillargeon (born 1954), Canadian academic
- Baillargeon Brothers, Canadian professional wrestlers
  - Adrien Baillargeon (1918–1995)
  - Antonio Baillargeon (1928–1997)
  - Charles Baillargeon (1917–2010)
  - Jean Baillargeon (1915–1994)
  - Lionel Baillargeon (1921–1982)
  - Paul Baillargeon (wrestler) (1922–1999)
