= PWG Twenty: Mystery Vortex =

Twenty: Mystery Vortex
- Promotion: Pro Wrestling Guerrilla
- Date: August 13, 2023
- City: Los Angeles, California
- Venue: Globe Theatre

Event chronology
| ← Previous; Battle of Los Angeles | Next → — |

Anniversary Show chronology
| ← Previous; Nineteen | Next → — |

Mystery Vortex chronology
| ← Previous; Mystery Vortex 7 | Next → — |

Twenty: Mystery Vortex was a professional wrestling event produced by Pro Wrestling Guerrilla (PWG), which took place at the Globe Theatre in Los Angeles, California on August 13, 2023. It was the eighth edition of PWG's Mystery Vortex event and the nineteenth edition of PWG's Anniversary Show, marking the twentieth anniversary of the promotion, as the promotion's first event took place in July 2003.

Six professional wrestling matches were contested at the event. The main event was a sixty-minute Iron Man match, in which Battle of Los Angeles winner Mike Bailey challenged Daniel Garcia for the PWG World Championship. The match ended in a tie until Garcia won in overtime to retain the title. Maintaining the element of surprise of Mystery Vortex, no matches were announced beforehand and featured many surprise returns and debuts. Notably, All Elite Wrestling star Jon Moxley made his surprise PWG debut by defeating Titus Alexander. The event also featured the surprise return of former PWG World Champion Roderick Strong after a seven-year absence, having last appeared for the promotion at Thirteen in 2016. Strong defeated Michael Oku in his return match.

== Production ==
On July 19, 2023, PWG announced via its official Twitter handle that Twenty: Mystery Vortex would take place on August 13, 2023. It marked the first PWG event in seven months since the Battle of Los Angeles in January. Tickets for the event went on sale on January 24.

== Results ==
| No. | Results | Stipulations | Times |
|---|---|---|---|
| 1 | Konosuke Takeshita defeated Rey Horus | Singles match | 13:00 |
| 2 | Jon Moxley defeated Titus Alexander | Singles match | 9:30 |
| 3 | Roderick Strong defeated Michael Oku | Singles match | 19:30 |
| 4 | Aramís, Evil Uno and Maki Itoh defeated Látigo, Masha Slamovich and Peter Avalon | Six-person mixed tag team match | 17:20 |
| 5 | Rey Fenix defeated Black Taurus | Singles match | 10:30 |
| 6 | Daniel Garcia (c) defeated Mike Bailey (4-3) | 60-minute Iron man match for the PWG World Championship | 60:00 |
(c) / – the champion(s) heading into the match
