= Battle of Los Angeles (2023) =

2023 professional wrestling tournament by PWG

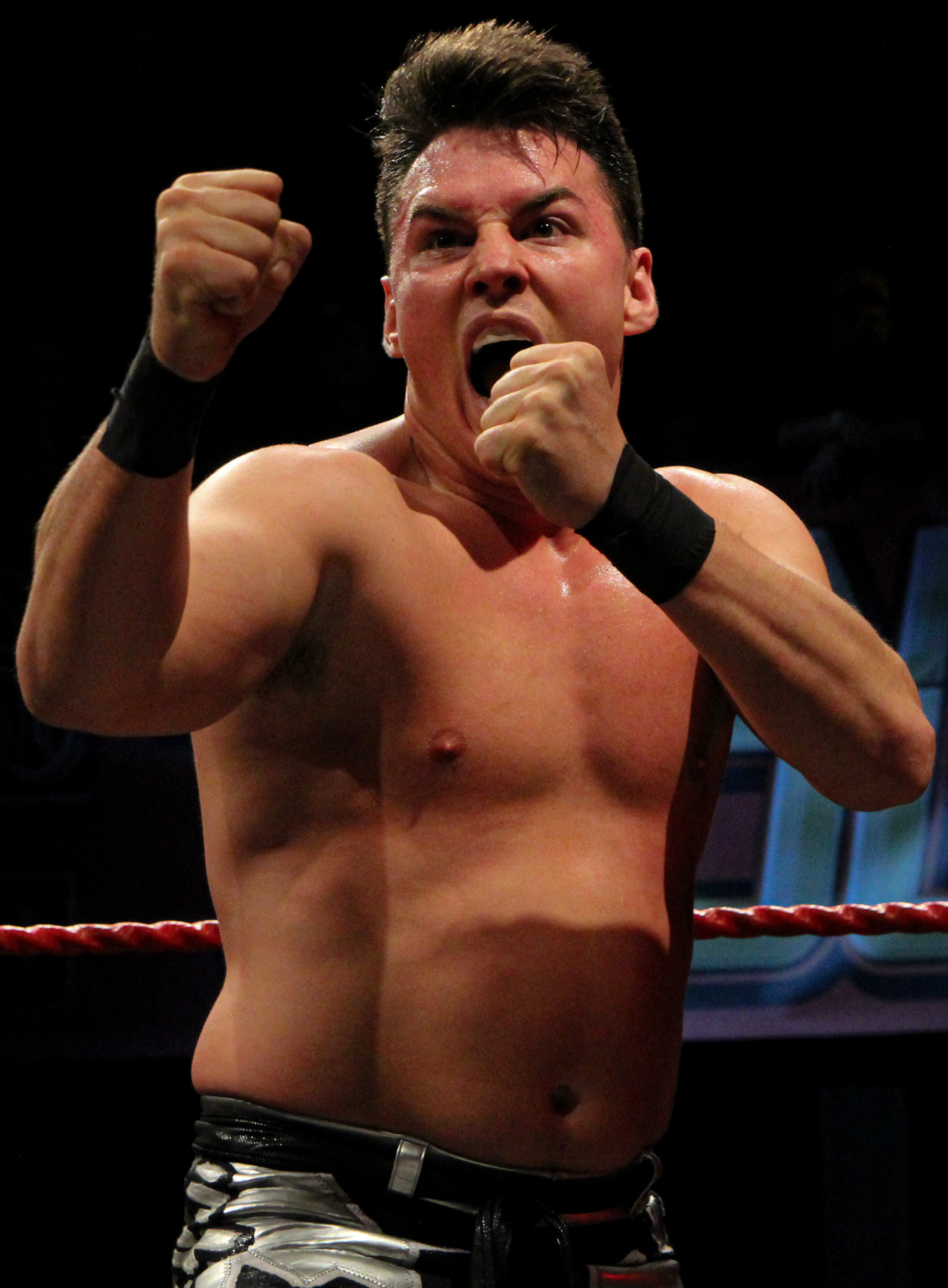
- The 2023 tournament winner Mike Bailey
- Promotion: Pro Wrestling Guerrilla
- Date: Night One: January 7, 2023; Night Two: January 8, 2023
- City: Los Angeles, California
- Venue: Globe Theatre

Event chronology
← Previous; DINK	Next → Twenty: Mystery Vortex

Battle of Los Angeles chronology
← Previous; 2022	Next → —

The 2023 Battle of Los Angeles was the seventeenth Battle of Los Angeles professional wrestling tournament produced by Pro Wrestling Guerrilla (PWG). It was a two-night event on January 7 and 8, 2023, at the Globe Theatre in Los Angeles, California.

The tournament marked the PWG debuts of Michael Oku, Shun Skywalker, El Hijo del Vikingo, SB Kento and Bryan Keith as well as the surprise PWG debut of Chris Jericho. Mike Bailey won the Battle of Los Angeles tournament by defeating Konosuke Takeshita in the final. Two non-tournament matches took place on the second night. In the first match, Black Taurus and Latigo defeated Aramis and Rey Horus. The second match was a ten-man tag team match in which Jericho Appreciation Society (Chris Jericho, Daniel Garcia, Angelo Parker, Matt Menard and Sammy Guevara) defeated Jonathan Gresham, Kevin Blackwood, Michael Oku, Player Uno, and SB Kento.

== Production ==
=== Background ===
On November 22, 2022, PWG announced via its official Twitter handle that the 2023 Battle of Los Angeles tournament would take place on January 7 and January 8, 2023.

=== Original line-up ===
The following participants were announced to participate in the tournament: Michael Oku, Shun Skywalker, Masha Slamovich, "Speedball" Mike Bailey, Komander, Alex Shelley, Jonathan Gresham, Aramís, Titus Alexander, Jordynne Grace, Lio Rush, Black Taurus, Latigo, 2022 winner and the World Champion Daniel Garcia, 2019 winner Bandido, Konosuke Takeshita and El Hijo del Vikingo.

On December 14, PWG tweeted that Bailey would be unable to compete in his first round match on the night one but committed to compete in his first round match on night two. It prompted PWG to add SB Kento as the eighteenth participant in the tournament and PWG announced that a match would be held on night one to determine Bailey's opponent on night two. On December 15, PWG revealed the list of first-round matches on night one including a three-way match between Bandido, Black Taurus, and El Hijo del Vikingo.

=== Replacement ===
Due to injuries sustained in a match at Wrestle Kingdom 17, Lio Rush was removed from the tournament on January 5 and replaced with the debuting Bryan Keith.

== Event ==
=== Night One ===
The Battle of Los Angeles kicked off with a match between Alex Shelley and Masha Slamovich. Slamovich countered a sit-out side powerslam attempt by Shelley into a cradle and pinned him for the win.

Next, SB Kento took on Bryan Keith. Keith hit a knee strike and a powerbomb for the win.

Next, Komander took on Latigo. Komander pinned Latigo with a cradle after a ropewalk shooting star press.

Next, Jonathan Gresham took on Jordynne Grace. Grace countered a European clutch by Gresham into a choke to win via submission. Grace advanced to compete against Mike Bailey in the first round match on the night two.

Next, Aramis took on Shun Skywalker. Skywalker delivered a spinning powerbomb to Aramis for the win.

Next, Konosuke Takeshita took on Michael Oku. Takeshita delivered a jumping knee strike and a running knee strike to Oku for the win.

Next, the World Champion Daniel Garcia took on Titus Alexander. Garcia was disqualified after the referee caught him hitting Alexander with the World Championship title belt.

It was followed by a three-way match between Bandido, Black Taurus, and El Hijo del Vikingo. Bandido delivered a kneeling reverse piledriver to Taurus for the win.

=== Night Two ===
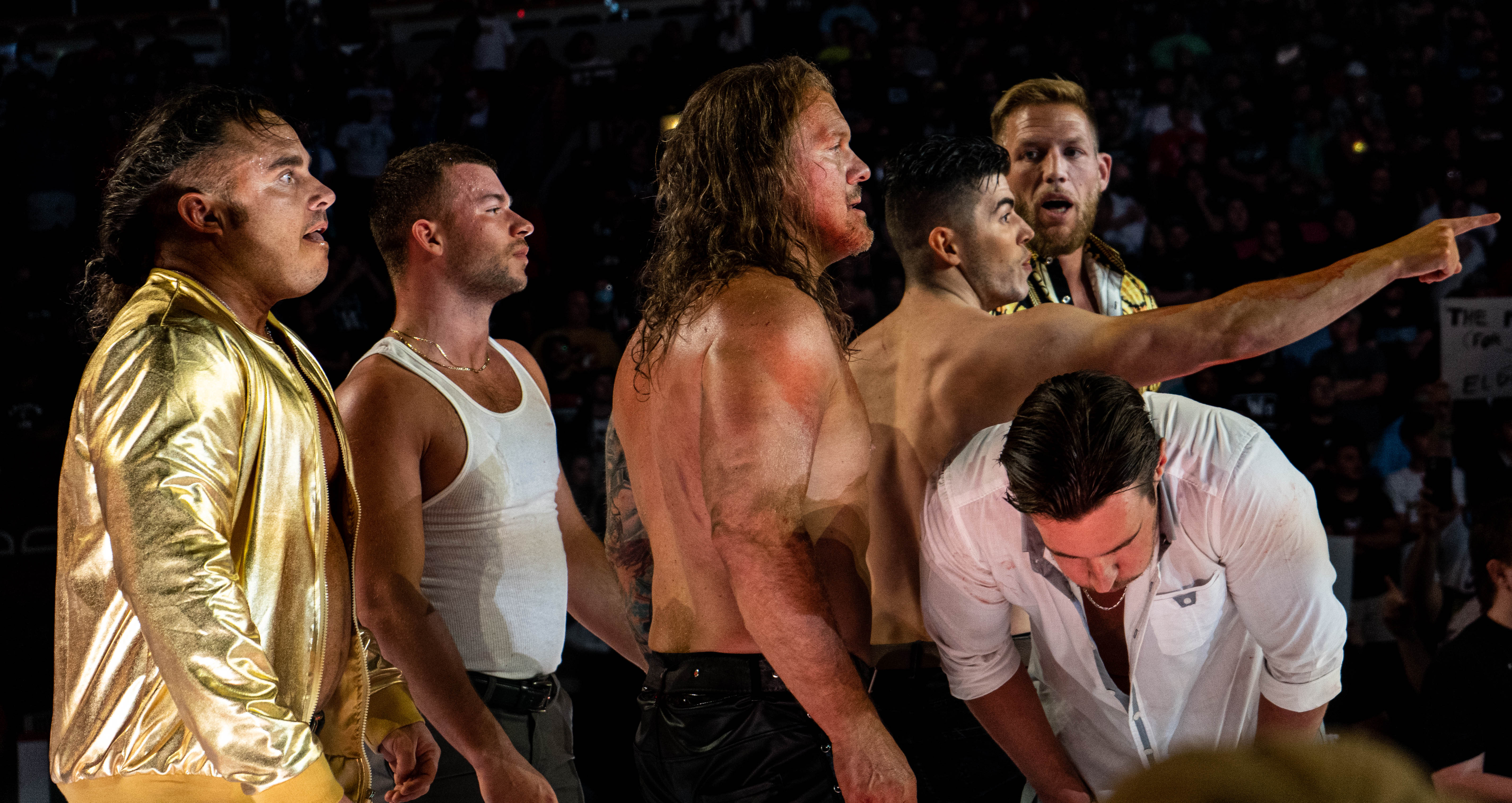
Jericho Appreciation Society made a surprise appearance at Battle of Los Angeles and won the ensuing ten-man tag team match.

The night two opened with the first round match between Mike Bailey and Jordynne Grace. Bailey delivered a Flamingo Driver to Grace for the win.

Quarterfinals

The quarterfinal round of the Battle of Los Angeles began as Konosuke Takeshita took on Titus Alexander. Takeshita delivered a jumping knee strike to Alexander for the win.

Next, Bryan Keith took on Masha Slamovich. Keith delivered a running knee strike to Slamovich for the win.

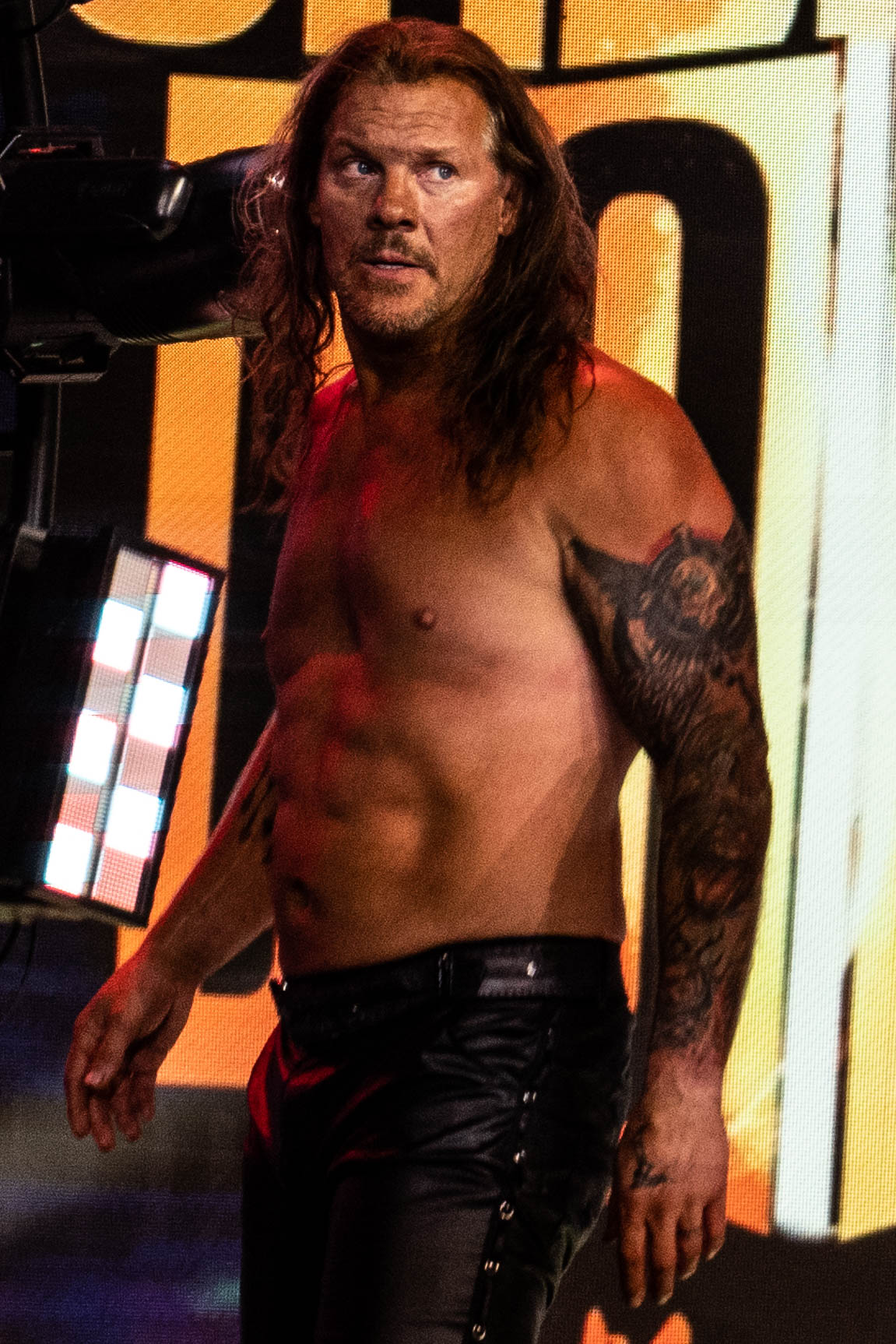
Chris Jericho made his surprise PWG debut at the event.

Next, Bandido took on Komander. Komander delivered a ropewalk shooting star press to Bandido for the win.

Next, Mike Bailey took on Shun Skywalker. Bailey delivered a shooting star press with double knees to Skywalker's chest for the win.

It was followed by a tag team match in which Black Taurus teamed with Latigo to take on Aramis and Rey Horus. Taurus delivered a powerbomb, a backbreaker and a belly-to-back piledriver to Horus for the win.

Semifinals

In the first semifinal match, Konosuke Takeshita defeated Komander by pinning him with a backslide.

Next, Mike Bailey took on Bryan Keith. Bailey delivered an Ultima Weapon on Keith's back for the win.

It was followed by a ten-man tag team match featuring a surprise appearance by Jericho Appreciation Society (Angelo Parker, Chris Jericho, Daniel Garcia, Matt Menard and Sammy Guevara), thus marking Jericho's surprise PWG debut. Parker and Menard made their surprise returns to PWG after a near fifteen-year absence, having last appeared at the 2008 DDT4 while Guevara also made his surprise PWG return after a four-year absence, having last appeared as a participant in the 2018 Battle of Los Angeles. JAS took on Jonathan Gresham, Kevin Blackwood, Michael Oku, Player Uno and SB Kento. Jericho delivered a Judas Effect to Blackwood for the win.

Final

Mike Bailey took on Konosuke Takeshita in the final of the 2023 Battle of Los Angeles. Bailey delivered an Ultima Weapon and a Flamingo Driver to Takeshita to win the tournament.

== Aftermath ==
By winning the Battle of Los Angeles tournament, Mike Bailey received his PWG World Championship against champion Daniel Garcia in an Iron Man match at Twenty: Mystery Vortex, which Garcia won to retain the title.

== Results ==
Night 1 (January 7)
No.	Results	Stipulations	Times
1	Masha Slamovich defeated Alex Shelley	Singles match in the first round of the Battle of Los Angeles tournament	11:01
2	Bryan Keith defeated SB Kento	Singles match in the first round of the Battle of Los Angeles tournament	14:08
3	Komander defeated Latigo	Singles match in the first round of the Battle of Los Angeles tournament	15:04
4	Jordynne Grace defeated Jonathan Gresham	Singles match to determine Mike Bailey's opponent in the first round of the Battle of Los Angeles tournament on night two	14:56
5	Shun Skywalker defeated Aramis	Singles match in the first round of the Battle of Los Angeles tournament	14:27
6	Konosuke Takeshita defeated Michael Oku	Singles match in the first round of the Battle of Los Angeles tournament	17:17
7	Titus Alexander defeated Daniel Garcia via disqualification	Singles match in the first round of the Battle of Los Angeles tournament	18:54
8	Bandido defeated Black Taurus and El Hijo del Vikingo	Three-way match in the first round of the Battle of Los Angeles tournament	18:20

Night 2 (January 8)
No.	Results	Stipulations	Times
1	Mike Bailey defeated Jordynne Grace	Singles match in the first round of the Battle of Los Angeles tournament	15:41
2	Konosuke Takeshita defeated Titus Alexander	Singles match in the quarter-final round of the Battle of Los Angeles tournament	9:38
3	Bryan Keith defeated Masha Slamovich	Singles match in the quarter-final round of the Battle of Los Angeles tournament	15:45
4	Komander defeated Bandido	Singles match in the quarter-final round of the Battle of Los Angeles tournament	14:42
5	Mike Bailey defeated Shun Skywalker	Singles match in the quarter-final round of the Battle of Los Angeles tournament	15:39
6	Black Taurus and Latigo defeated Aramis and Rey Horus	Tag team match	10:38
7	Konosuke Takeshita defeated Komander	Singles match in the semi-final round of the Battle of Los Angeles tournament	5:43
8	Mike Bailey defeated Bryan Keith	Singles match in the semi-final round of the Battle of Los Angeles tournament	18:12
9	The Jericho Appreciation Society (Angelo Parker, Chris Jericho, Daniel Garcia, Matt Menard and Sammy Guevara) defeated Jonathan Gresham, Kevin Blackwood, Michael Oku, Player Uno and SB Kento	Ten-man tag team match	19:12
10	Mike Bailey defeated Konosuke Takeshita	Singles match in the Battle of Los Angeles tournament final	27:22

=== Tournament brackets ===
Battle of Los Angeles (2023)
Tournament information
- Sport: Professional wrestling
- Location: Los Angeles, California
- Dates: January 7, 2023–January 8, 2023
- Tournament format(s): Single elimination tournament
- Participants: 17

Final positions
- Champion: Mike Bailey
- Runner-up: Konosuke Takeshita

Qualifier
Jonathan Gresham	Submission
Jordynne Grace	14:56

First round
Alex Shelley	Pin
Masha Slamovich	11:01
SB Kento	Pin
Bryan Keith	14:08
Jordynne Grace	Pin
Mike Bailey	15:41
Aramis	Pin
Shun Skywalker	14:27
Komander	Pin
Latigo	15:04
Bandido	Pin
Black Taurus El Hijo del Vikingo	18:20
Konosuke Takeshita	Pin
Michael Oku	17:17
Daniel Garcia	DQ
Titus Alexander	18:54

Quarterfinals
Masha Slamovich	Pin
Bryan Keith	15:45
Mike Bailey	Pin
Shun Skywalker	15:39
Komander	Pin
Bandido	14:42
Konosuke Takeshita	Pin
Titus Alexander	9:38

Semifinals
Bryan Keith	Pin
Mike Bailey	18:12
Komander	Pin
Konosuke Takeshita	5:43

Final
Mike Bailey	Pin
Konosuke Takeshita	27:22
