= Jericho Appreciation Society =

American professional wrestling stable

Stable
- Leader: Chris Jericho
- Members: Daniel Garcia; Jake Hager; Angelo Parker; Matt Menard; Sammy Guevara; Tay Melo; Anna Jay
- Name: Jericho Appreciation Society
- Debut: March 9, 2022
- Disbanded: August 9, 2023
- Years active: 2022–2023

The Jericho Appreciation Society (JAS) was a villainous professional wrestling stable formed in American professional wrestling promotion All Elite Wrestling (AEW), created and led by Chris Jericho and also appeared in AEW's sister promotion, Ring of Honor (ROH). The group also included Daniel Garcia, Jake Hager, Angelo Parker, Matt Menard, Sammy Guevara, Tay Melo, and Anna Jay A.S., several of whom were members of Jericho's previous stable, The Inner Circle.

The group frequently made reference to "sports entertainment", a term used by WWE, where Jericho wrestled between 1999 and 2018.

== History ==
=== All Elite Wrestling and Ring of Honor (2022–2023) ===
On March 6 at Revolution, Chris Jericho was defeated by Eddie Kingston. On March 9, Jericho turned heel when he, 2point0, Daniel Garcia, and Jake Hager attacked Santana and Ortiz, and Kingston. The following week, Jericho stated that the fans and the Inner Circle did not appreciate him and that Eddie Kingston embarrassed him by making him tap out. He then dubbed the stable as "sports-entertainers" who beat up wrestlers. On the May 11 episode of Dynamite, Kingston along with Santana and Ortiz, united with the Blackpool Combat Club (William Regal, Bryan Danielson, Jon Moxley, and Wheeler Yuta) to fight off the Jericho Appreciation Society.

The following week, Kingston agreed to team with Moxley and Danielson, along with Santana and Ortiz, to wrestle the Jericho Appreciation Society in an Anarchy in the Arena match at Double or Nothing, in which the Jericho Appreciation Society emerged victorious. On June 15 at Road Rager, Jericho defeated Ortiz in a Hair vs. Hair match following interference from former Inner Circle teammate Sammy Guevara, who joined the stable along with his fiancé, Tay Conti. On June 26, 2022, at AEW x NJPW: Forbidden Door, Chris Jericho and Sammy Guevara, under the sub-unit of "Le Sex Gods" teamed up with Minoru Suzuki to defeat Eddie Kingston, Shota Umino, and Wheeler Yuta. At Blood and Guts on June 29, The JAS were defeated by the Blackpool Combat Club, Santana and Ortiz, and Kingston in a Blood and Guts match. On July 20 at Fyter Fest, Anna Jay joined the stable after attacking Ruby Soho and allowing the JAS to help Jericho defeat Kingston in a "Barbed Wire Everywhere Deathmatch". On August 17, after Bryan Danielson defeated Daniel Garcia on a 2 out of 3 falls match, Jericho attacked Danielson from behind but was pulled off by Garcia, who slapped his hand away before Jericho left the ring. On September 4 at All Out, Jericho defeated Danielson after which he celebrated with the entirety of the JAS, minus Garcia. The following week on Dynamite, Garcia defeated Wheeler Yuta for the ROH Pure Championship. After the match, he showed respect to Yuta and celebrated with Danielson, increasing tensions between Jericho and Garcia.

On September 22 during Dynamite: Grand Slam, Jericho defeated Claudio Castagnoli to win the ROH World Championship, marking his overall eighth world title. The following week on Dynamite, Jericho gave Garcia a bucket hat as a peace offering but demanded he picks a side. Garcia threw down the hat and told Jericho he didn't take orders from him. Bryan Danielson came down and told Garcia to make his own decision, and offered him a spot in the Blackpool Combat Club. The next week Danielson and Garcia teamed up in a tag team match against Jericho and Sammy Guevara. Jericho and Guevara would win the match following Jericho hitting Garcia with his Ring of Honor World Championship belt.

On the October 12 episode of Dynamite, Garcia would assist Jericho in retaining the ROH World Championship against Danielson, realigning himself with the JAS. There was some brief dissension within the JAS as Jericho was forced to defend the title against Guevara as well as Claudio Castagnoli and Bryan Danielson in a four-way match at Full Gear, which Jericho retained.

At Final Battle, Parker and Menard defeated Shinobi Shadow Squad (Cheeseburger and Eli Isom) on the pre-show while Garcia lost the Pure Championship to Wheeler Yuta and Jericho lost the ROH World Championship to Claudio Castagnoli.

On the August 9, 2023, episode of Dynamite, a mandatory meeting for the Jericho Appreciation Society was held after Jericho began interacting with Don Callis and eventually having an intent to join the Don Callis Family with Konosuke Takeshita. Every single member proceeded to walk out on Jericho, with only Sammy being open to returning if Jericho fixes the situation. In subsequent weeks, the other members remained together as a group without a name, while Sammy and Jericho briefly reformed their tag team, Le Sex Gods, before Guevara challenged Jericho to a match at the 2023 Grand Slam, citing the desire not to be seen in Jericho's shadow. At Grand Slam, Jericho defeated Guevara, but was betrayed by Sammy striking him with a low blow after the match and then being revealed as the newest member of the Don Callis Family.

=== Pro Wrestling Guerrilla (2023) ===
Shortly after the formation of JAS, Garcia enjoyed success in Pro Wrestling Guerrilla (PWG) by cashing in his PWG World Championship opportunity which he earned by winning the Battle of Los Angeles earlier in the year, at Delivering The Goods in May 2022. Garcia went on to defeat Bandido to win the title.

At the 2023 Battle of Los Angeles, Garcia was supposed to compete in a six-man tag team match but he refused to team with his partners and said that he only teamed with "sports entertainers", leading to the surprise appearance of JAS in PWG. This marked Jericho's debut in the company, Guevara's return to PWG after a four-year absence, and Menard and Parker's return after a fourteen-year absence. JAS went on to defeat Jonathan Gresham, Kevin Blackwood, Michael Oku, Player Uno and SB Kento in a ten-man tag team match.

== Members ==
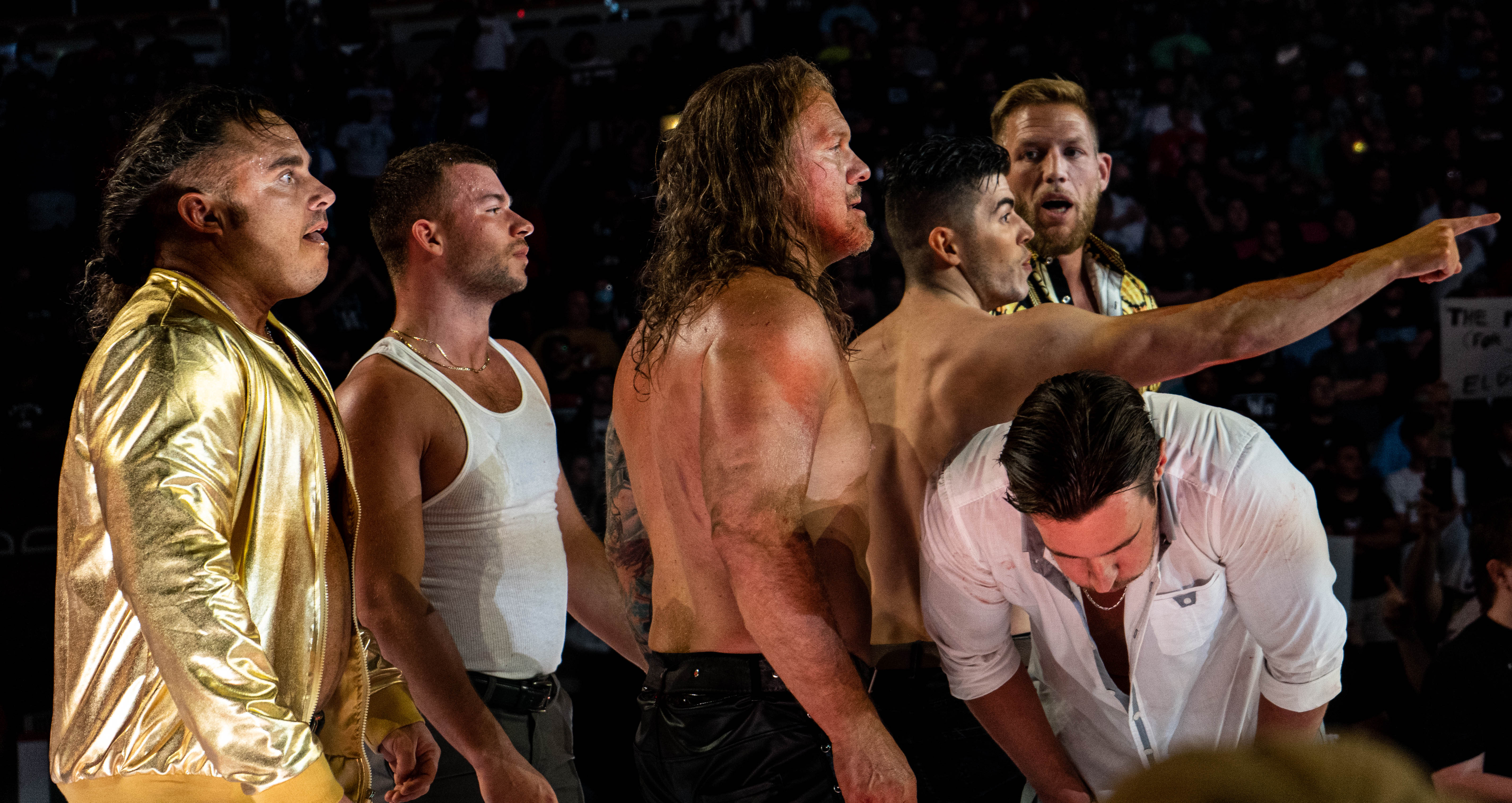
From left to right: Matt Menard, Daniel Garcia, Chris Jericho, Sammy Guevara, Jake Hager and Angelo Parker (ducking down) on June 26, 2022, at AEW x NJPW: Forbidden Door.

*	Founding members
L	Leader

=== Former ===
Name	Joined	Left
Chris Jericho (L)	March 9, 2022*	August 9, 2023
Daniel Garcia	March 9, 2022*	August 9, 2023
Jake Hager	March 9, 2022*	August 9, 2023
Angelo Parker	March 9, 2022*	August 9, 2023
Matt Menard	March 9, 2022*	August 9, 2023
Sammy Guevara	June 15, 2022	August 9, 2023
Tay Conti / Tay Melo	June 15, 2022	August 9, 2023
Anna Jay / Anna Jay A.S.	July 20, 2022	August 9, 2023

== Sub-groups ==
Affiliate	Members	Tenure	Promotion(s)
Angelo Parker and Matt Menard	Angelo Parker; Matt Menard	2022–2023	Tag team

== Championships and accomplishments ==
- Lucha Libre AAA Worldwide
  - AAA World Mixed Tag Team Championship (1 time) – Guevara and Conti/Melo
- Pro Wrestling Illustrated
  - Ranked Jericho No. 22 of the top 500 singles wrestlers in the PWI 500 in 2022
  - Ranked Guevara No. 28 of the top 500 singles wrestlers in the PWI 500 in 2022
  - Ranked Garcia No. 48 of the top 500 singles wrestlers in the PWI 500 in 2022
  - Ranked Hager No. 301 of the top 500 singles wrestlers in the PWI 500 in 2022
  - Ranked Parker No. 368 of the top 500 singles wrestlers in the PWI 500 in 2022
  - Ranked Menard No. 369 of the top 500 singles wrestlers in the PWI 500 in 2022
  - Ranked Jay No. 103 of the top 150 female wrestlers in the PWI Women's 150 in 2022
  - Ranked Melo No. 127 of the top 150 singles wrestlers in the PWI Women's 150 in 2022
- Ring of Honor
  - ROH World Championship (1 time) – Jericho
  - ROH Pure Championship (1 time) – Garcia
