= Battle of Los Angeles (2022) =

2022 professional wrestling tournament by PWG

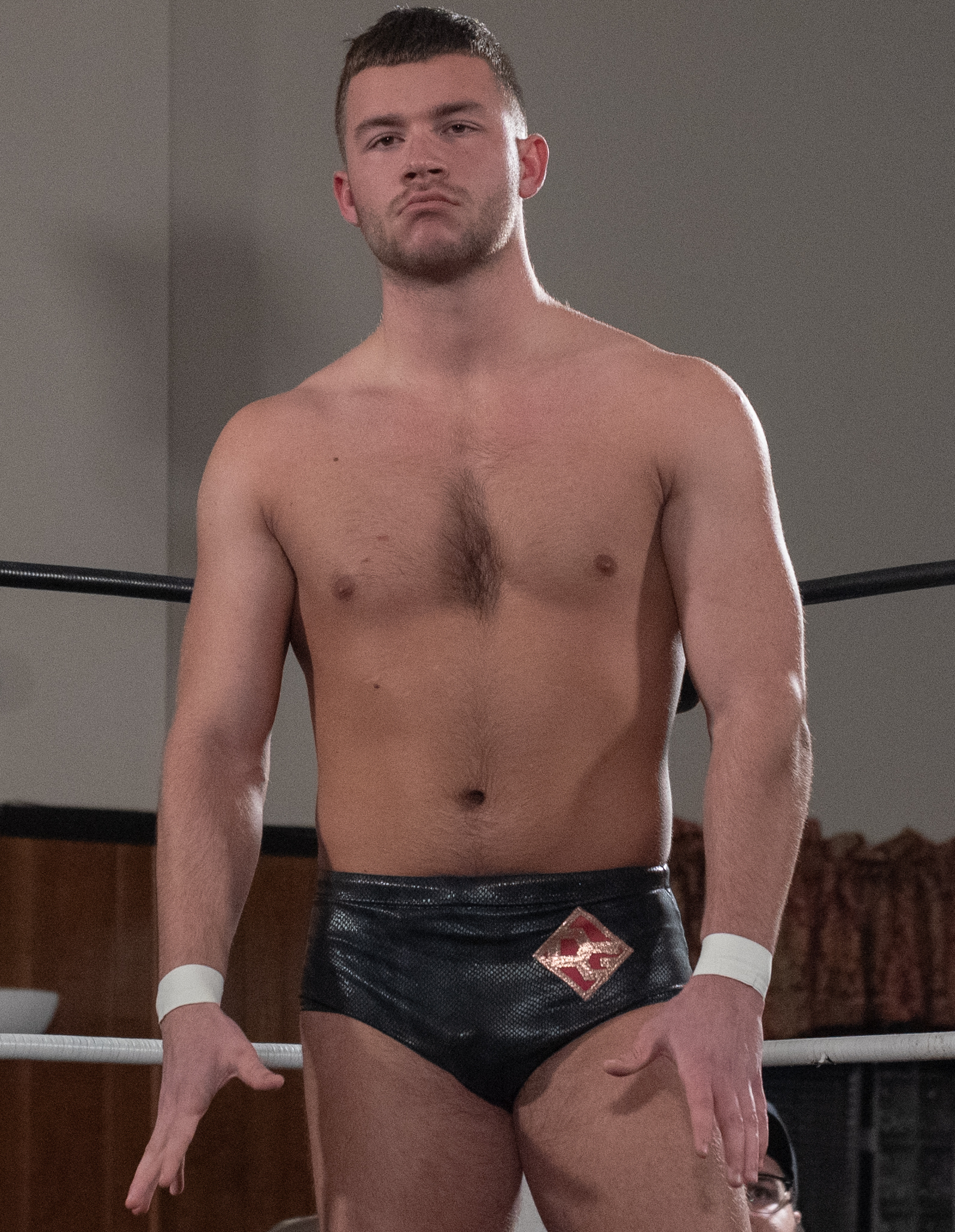
- The 2022 tournament winner Daniel Garcia
- Promotion: Pro Wrestling Guerrilla
- Date: Night One: January 29, 2022; Night Two: January 30, 2022
- City: Los Angeles, California
- Venue: Globe Theatre
- Attendance: Night One: 600; Night Two: 600

Event chronology
← Previous; It's A Long Way To The Top (If You Wanna Rock 'n' Roll)	Next → Delivering The Goods

Battle of Los Angeles chronology
← Previous; 2019	Next → 2023

Battle of Los Angeles (2022) was the sixteenth Battle of Los Angeles professional wrestling tournament produced by Pro Wrestling Guerrilla (PWG). It was a two-night event which took place on January 29 and January 30, 2022 at the Globe Theatre in Los Angeles, California.

The night one of the tournament featured the first round matches of the tournament. The night two featured the quarterfinals, semifinals and final rounds of the tournament and an eight-man tag team match featuring losers of the first round matches from night one. Daniel Garcia defeated Mike Bailey in the final to win the 2022 Battle of Los Angeles.

== Production ==
=== Background ===
PWG postponed its planned event KOBE scheduled for March 29, 2020 due to the outbreak of the COVID-19 pandemic in the United States. On June 11, 2021, PWG announced via Twitter that it would resume holding events with Mystery Vortex 7 on August 1, the last event held being The Makings of a Varsity Athlete on December 20, 2019. On November 29, PWG announced that Battle of Los Angeles tournament would return in 2022 for the first time since 2019 and would be taking place on January 29 and January 30, 2022.

=== Original line-up ===
The following participants would be announced for the tournament: Jonah Rock, Alex Shelley, Kevin Blackwood, Lio Rush, Black Taurus, Daniel Garcia, Jack Cartwheel, 2019 winner and PWG World Champion Bandido, Lee Moriarty, 2006 winner Davey Richards, Aramis, Jonathan Gresham, JD Drake, Rey Horus, the fictitious "Phillip Five Skulls" and Buddy Matthews.

=== Replacement ===
On January 11, 2022, PWG announced that the non-existent Skulls had retired and he was replaced by ″Speedball″ Mike Bailey. On January 28, Gresham withdrew from the tournament due to testing positive for COVID-19. Gresham's scheduled opponent Richards also withdrew from the tournament and both men would be replaced by Wheeler Yuta and Blake Christian, who would compete against each other.

== Aftermath ==
After winning the 2022 Battle of Los Angeles, Garcia received a title shot against Bandido for the PWG World Championship at Delivering The Goods event on May 1, which Garcia won.

== Results ==
Night 1 (January 29)
No.	Results	Stipulations
1	Aramís defeated Rey Horus	Battle of Los Angeles tournament first round match
2	Wheeler Yuta defeated Blake Christian	Battle of Los Angeles tournament first round match
3	Buddy Matthews defeated JONAH	Battle of Los Angeles tournament first round match
4	Daniel Garcia defeated Kevin Blackwood	Battle of Los Angeles tournament first round match
5	Lio Rush defeated Jack Cartwheel	Battle of Los Angeles tournament first round match
6	Black Taurus defeated JD Drake	Battle of Los Angeles tournament first round match
7	Alex Shelley defeated Lee Moriarty	Battle of Los Angeles tournament first round match
8	Mike Bailey defeated Bandido	Battle of Los Angeles tournament first round match

Night 2 (January 30)
No.	Results	Stipulations
1	Black Taurus defeated Aramís	Battle of Los Angeles tournament second round match
2	Daniel Garcia defeated Alex Shelley	Battle of Los Angeles tournament second round match
3	Lio Rush defeated Buddy Matthews by disqualification	Battle of Los Angeles tournament second round match
4	Mike Bailey defeated Wheeler Yuta	Battle of Los Angeles tournament second round match
5	Daniel Garcia defeated Black Taurus	Battle of Los Angeles tournament semi-final match
6	Mike Bailey defeated Buddy Matthews	Battle of Los Angeles tournament semi-final match
7	Blake Christian, JONAH, Kevin Blackwood and Rey Horus defeated Bandido, Jack Cartwheel, JD Drake and Lee Moriarty	Eight-man tag team match
8	Daniel Garcia defeated Mike Bailey	Battle of Los Angeles tournament final

=== Tournament brackets ===
Battle of Los Angeles (2022)
Tournament information
- Sport: Professional wrestling
- Location: Los Angeles, California
- Dates: January 29, 2022–January 30, 2022
- Tournament format(s): Single elimination tournament
- Participants: 16

Final positions
- Champion: Daniel Garcia
- Runner-up: Mike Bailey

First round
Daniel Garcia	Submission
Kevin Blackwood	14:57
Alex Shelley	Pinfall
Lee Moriarty	18:12
Aramís	Pinfall
Rey Horus	13:05
Black Taurus	Pinfall
JD Drake	14:21
Mike Bailey	Pinfall
Bandido	20:36
Blake Christian	14:07
Wheeler Yuta	Pinfall
Jonah	15:25
Buddy Matthews	Pinfall
Jack Cartwheel	13:14
Lio Rush	Pinfall

Quarterfinals
Daniel Garcia	Submission
Alex Shelley	14:14
Aramís	12:54
Black Taurus	Pinfall
Mike Bailey	Pinfall
Wheeler Yuta	13:10
Buddy Matthews	15:44
Lio Rush†	DQ

Semifinals
Daniel Garcia	Submission
Black Taurus	9:58
Mike Bailey	Pinfall
Buddy Matthews†	0:08

Final
Daniel Garcia	Submission
Mike Bailey	28:06

†Lio Rush suffered an injury which forced him to withdraw and was replaced by his quarterfinal opponent Buddy Matthews.
