= Les Fermières Obsédées =

Les Fermières Obsédées (F.O., "Obsessed Farm Wives") is a contemporary Québécois feminist visual art performance ensemble founded by Annie Baillargeon and Eugénie Cliche in 2001. The name refers to a feminist organization, Cercles des fermières, in Quebec.
