= Annie Baillargeon =

Canadian artist

- Born: 1978 (age 47–48); Victoriaville, Quebec
- Known for: Photomontage and Performance Art
- Awards: Salt Spring National Art Prize (2015)
- Website: Artist website

Annie Baillargeon (born 1978) is a Canadian artist known for photomontage and performance art. A mix of "performance and relational aesthetics with new media art techniques", her work is found in the collections of the National Gallery of Canada, Canada Council for the Arts Art Bank and the Musée national des beaux-arts du Québec. Her images have also been exhibited at the Musée national des beaux-arts du Québec, Musée d'art contemporain de Montréal, Contact Photography Festival in Toronto, and at the Liverpool Biennial. A co-founder of the art action collectives, Les Fermières Obsédées (2001-2015) and Les B.L.U.S.H. (2015-), she has performed at the Musée national des beaux-arts du Québec and internationally in the United States, Ireland, Wales, Poland and Australia.

Baillargeon's photomontages are characterized by staged, sole or patterned self-portraits. As actor, set designer, and choreographer, her "kaleidoscopic" images and photographic narratives cross into performance art. Described as allegory, her work reflects feminist issues of physical violence, exploitation, and seduction, as well as the imagination, the dream, and the unconscious.

== Career highlights ==
Annie Baillargeon was born in 1978 in Victoriaville, Quebec. Interested in dance, cinema and the visual arts, in 2001 she co-founded the art-performance collective, Les Fermières Obsédées, and her first solo photographic exhibition was held at La Bande Vidéo (Québec QC). In 2005 a solo exhibition of her work was held at Gallery 44 (Toronto ON). She also performed with Les Fermières Obsédées in 2005 at the Eastern Edge Gallery (St.John's NL) and at the 2006, 7a*11d International Festival of Performance Art (Toronto ON). During this time Baillargeon participated in important art exhibitions at the Musée d'art contemporain de Montréal (2005), Musée national des beaux-arts du Québec (2008), Toronto Contact Photography Festival (2008), and the UK Liverpool Biennial (2010). In 2011 her series of "aesthetic choreographies", Emballage anatomique, was exhibited at La maison des artistes visuels francophone (Winnipeg MB) and at Galerie d'art Outremont (Montreal QC). By 2014 Baillargeon's photomontages included hand-painted lines and decorations on the surface of the prints. In a review of Les natures mortes: Épisodes de petits déclins at Galerie D'Este (Montreal), La Presse art critic Eric Clement also noted that "the narrative is now more obvious." In 2015, Baillargeon's award-winning "Les Cannibales" was exhibited in Vancouver, and the following year she participated in the exhibition In a Post-World: Post-Punk Art Now at The Invisible Dog Art Center (Brooklyn NY). In 2016-17 she created an art installation with young immigrants from the Centre communautaire Jasmine Turcotte-Vaillancourt. Interviewed in Le Devoir, Baillargeon commented: "The goal is to have fun, to remove their daily concerns and immerse them in creation." She also performed with her new collective B.L.U.S.H. at the 2016 Biennale d'art performatif de Rouyn-Noranda, while solo expositions of her work were held during the Quebec City Biennial at Bibliothèque Aliette-Marchand and at Galerie D'Este in Montreal. Baillargeon lives and works in Quebec City.

== Recognition and contribution ==
Baillargeon is recognized for both her innovative approach and the aesthetic quality of her work. Described as "choreographed gesture and luxuriant colors", art critic Guy Sioui Durand also noted that, with subtle "symbolic values", "the photographs of Annie Baillargeon 'revamp' the genre of allegory." Josianne Desloges wrote in Le Soleil that her work "borrowed both from Alice in Wonderland, unknown legends, and the disjointed visual universe of the multidisciplinary collective Les Fermières obsédées." Art critic Julie Boivon wrote that the underlying meaning in her work – "death, loss of self, helplessness" – once revealed is transformed into ornament. Describing her photomontages as "visually striking with "overwhelming detail ordered into semi-patterns" similar to Rococo Art, she also compared Baillargeon to contemporary artists Shary Boyle, Yannick Pouliot, and Wym Delvoye. For art writer Jean-François Caron, the artist's feminism aligns the body with "a multifaceted, unfixed intimacy which we see exposed, injured and manipulated". He concluded: "Annie Baillargeon's work is a call for the restitution of the individual... one must redefine oneself, reconstitute oneself, in order to recognize oneself". In 2015 she was awarded the Salt Spring National Art Prize Juror's Choice Award, and was listed for the Sobey's Art Prize in 2017.
