= Látigo =

Mexican wrestler (born 1990)

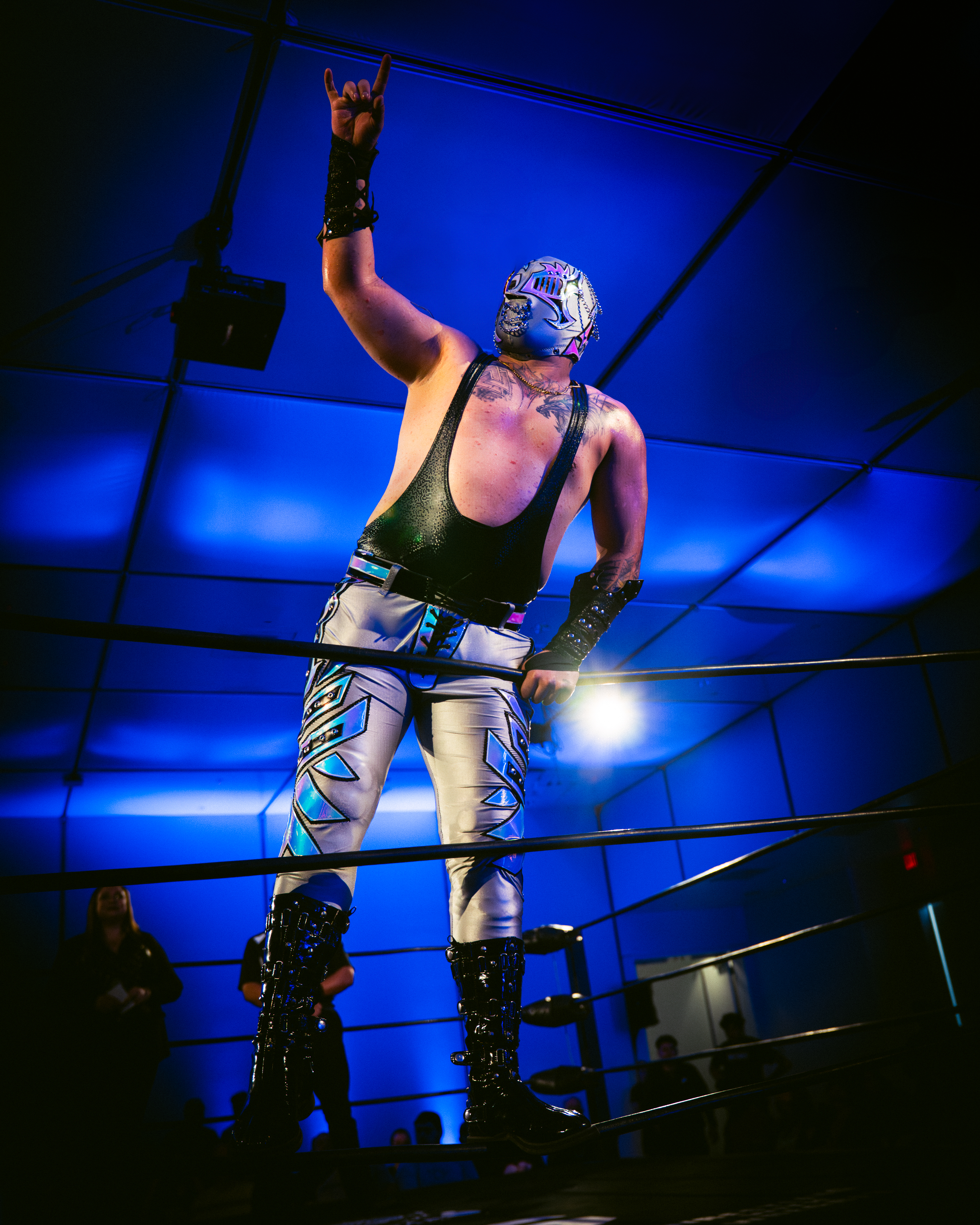
- Latigo in April 2025

Personal information
- Born: June 7, 1990 (age 36) Mexico City, Mexico

Professional wrestling career
- Trained by: Black Terry; Comando Negro; Dr. Muerte; Negro Navarro; Toro Negro Jr. Trauma I Trauma II
- Debut: 2012

Látigo (born June 7, 1990) is a Mexican professional wrestler. He is currently makes appearances for the promotion Game Changer Wrestling (GCW) and International Wrestling Revolution Group (IWRG). He is known for his time with Lucha Libre AAA Worldwide (AAA) and Pro Wrestling Guerrilla (PWG), where he wrestled as a rudo (heel), a part of the Los Nuevos Vipers group, based on the original stable Los Vipers. His uncle was CMLL luchador Raziel.

== Career ==
Latigo debuted in International Wrestling Revolution Group in 2012. In 2014 IWRG would repackage him as Leo, leader of the Tortugas Ninjas group. Látigo would leave the gimmick some time in 2015. A long time wrestler on the Mexico City independent scene, throughout 2015 and 2016 he would garner attention as a member of the La Mala Hierba stable with Fly Warrior and Centvrion.

In May 2018 he would wrestle his first match in Lucha Libre AAA Worldwide at a taping in Tehuacán. Wrestling another handful of matches for the promotion in 2018 and 2019, he wouldn't become a regular until 2021.

October 9, 2021 at Héroes Inmortales XIV, the Los Nuevos Vipers group was formed, which consisted of Látigo, Abismo Negro Jr., Arez, Chik Tormenta and with Psicosis as a mentor. On March 6, 2024, he left AAA.

After getting a work visa, Látigo made his United States debut in Garden State Pro Wrestling on August 27, 2022. With fellow Vipers member Arez, the team defeated Big Lucha wrestlers Elemental and El Bendito. He would regularly make appearances for Game Changer Wrestling throughout 2022 and made his debut for Pro Wrestling Guerrilla at the event DINK on November 6.

Shortly after, Latigo would be invited to participate in the Pro Wrestling Guerrillas Battle of Los Angeles event January 7–8, 2023. He lost his first round match to fellow luchador Komander, but would go on to score a tag team victory along with Black Taurus in an exhibition match against Aramis and Rey Horus on the second night of the event.

== Championships and accomplishments ==
- Indy Army Wrestling
  - IAW Championship (1 time, inaugural)
  - IAW Title Tournament (2020)
  - La Batalla De Los Barrios Tournament (2020)
- International Wrestling Revolution Group
  - IWRG Intercontinental Tag Team Championship (1 time) – with Toxin
  - IWRG Intercontinental Trios Championship (1 time) – with Arez and Toxin
- Hugo's Lucha Libre
  - Hugo's Lucha Libre Tag Team Championship (1 time) – with Arez
