= 2point0 =

Professional wrestling tag team

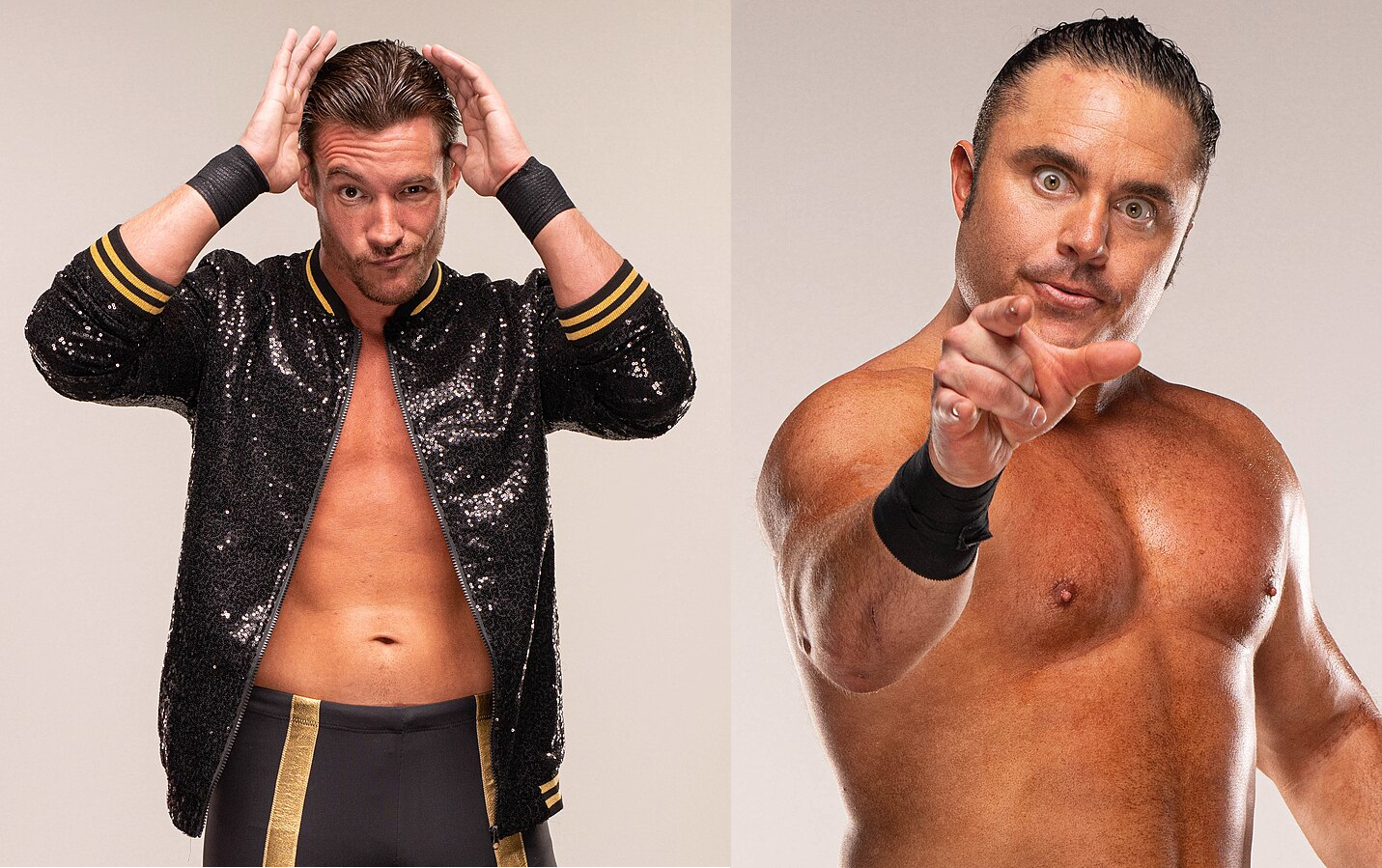
- Angelo Parker (left) and Matt Menard (right) in 2022

Statistics
- Members: Cool Hand Ang/Angelo Parker/Jeff Parker/Chad Badd/Chase Parker/Jagged/Jean-Paul/Scott Parker; Daddy Magic/Matt Menard/"Daddy Magic" Matt Menard/Matt Lee/Big Magic/Brad Badd/Francois/Matt Martel/Shane Matthews
- Name(s): 2.0; 3.0; The Badd Boyz; Hybrid; Ever-Rise; Jean-Paul and Francois; Angelo Parker and Matt Menard; Jericho Appreciation Society; Daddy Magic and Cool Hand Ang
- Billed heights: Parker: 5 ft 11 in (1.80 m); Menard: 5 ft 10 in (1.78 m)
- Combined billed weight: 403 lb (183 kg)
- Hometown: Châteauguay, Quebec, Canada
- Debut: 2003
- Trained by: The Dudley Boyz

Angelo Parker and Matt Menard, also formerly known as 2.0 (stylized as 2point0) and 3.0, and later Ever-Rise in WWE, are a Canadian professional wrestling tag team signed to All Elite Wrestling (AEW), both as wrestlers and, in Menard's case, an occasional commentator.

The team of "Cool Hand" Angelo Parker (born March 20, 1984) and "Daddy Magic" Matt Menard (born December 7, 1983) is best known for working for Chikara and International Wrestling Syndicate (IWS), but have also made appearances for several other independent promotions, including Ring of Honor (ROH), Combat Zone Wrestling (CZW), Independent Wrestling Association Mid-South (IWA-MS) and Pro Wrestling Guerrilla (PWG). They are former two-time holders of both the Chikara Campeonatos de Parejas and the IWS Tag Team Championship. They are also known for their time in WWE's developmental territory NXT, where they performed under the ring names Chase Parker and Matt Martel, respectively.

== Professional wrestling career ==
=== International Wrestling Syndicate (2004–2010, 2014–2019, 2022) ===
2.0 began working for Montreal, Quebec-based International Wrestling Syndicate (IWS) in June 2004. For the first six months in the promotion, Jagged and Shane Matthews worked as faces, but in January 2005 2.0 turned heel at a Northern Championship Wrestling (NCW) co-promoted event with IWS. On March 26, 2005, 2.0 received their first shot at the IWS Tag Team Championship, but were unable to dethrone the defending champions the Flying Hurricanes (Kenny the Bastard and Takao) in a four-way match, which also included SLI (Marc Le Grizzly and Viking) and the Wrecking Crew (Chris Wells and Tomassino). 2.0 received a rematch for the titles on July 9, 2005, during IWS' first, and only, show at The Arena in Philadelphia, but managed to defeat the Flying Hurricanes only via countout, which meant that they didn't win the championship. This set up a rubber match for August 20, when 2.0 finally defeated the Flying Hurricanes to win the IWS Tag Team Championship.

After five successful defenses and an eight-month reign, 2.0 lost the IWS Tag Team Championship to the Hardcore Ninjaz (Hardcore Ninja #1 and Hardcore Ninja #2) on June 2, 2006. Shortly afterwards Matthews tore his posterior cruciate ligament, which would sideline him for the rest of the year and forced Jagged to go on a singles career. On September 30, 2006, Jagged defeated Player Uno to win the IWS Canadian Championship, which he would hold for 63 days, before losing it to Dan Paysan. Matthews made his return as a face on March 24, 2007, to face Jagged in the first IWS match between the former members of 2.0. In the finish of the match Matthews turned heel and defeated Jagged, after an interference from Uncle Manny, which consequently turned Jagged face. On the following show Matthews explained that Jagged, unlike Manny, had shown no concern for him while he was out with his injury.

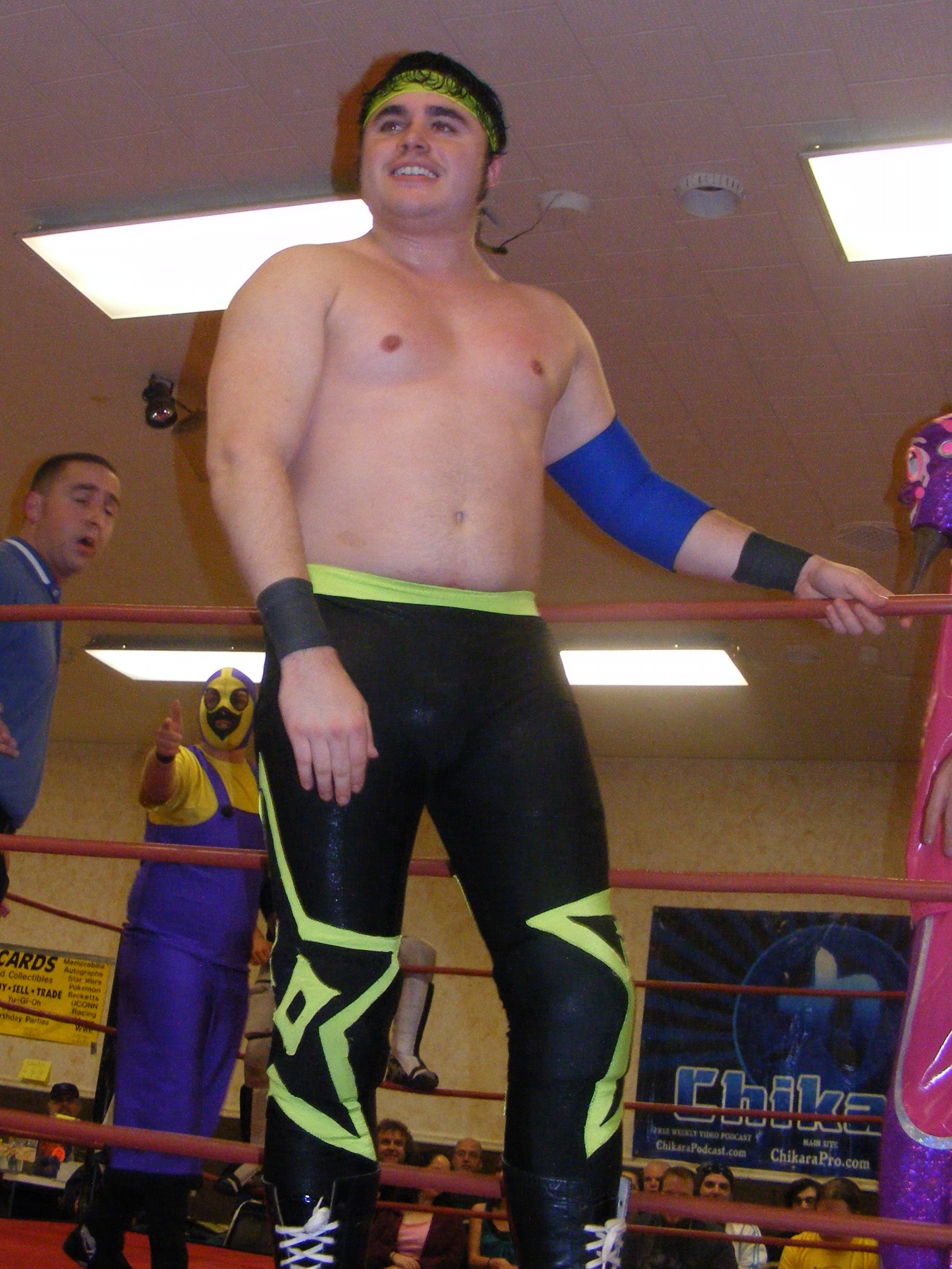
Shane Matthews in November 2008

After missing the next couple of shows, Jagged returned on June 16, 2007, and chased Matthews and Manny out of the ring, just as they were about to attack Twiggy. However, Jagged then turned on Twiggy, reunited with Matthews and announced that at the next event they would be challenging for the IWS Tag Team Championship. On July 14 2.0 regained the IWS Tag Team Championship from the Hardcore Ninjaz, but their second reign would turn out to be a short one as on September 22, 2007, they lost the titles to the Super Smash Bros. (Player Uno and Stupefied). 2.0 received a rematch for the titles on November 3, but were once again defeated, this time in a Two Out of Three Falls match. After multiple unsuccessful attempts at regaining the titles from teams such as Franky The Mobster and Twiggy and Up in Smoke (Cheech and Cloudy), 2.0 put their future as a tag team on the line in order to get one last shot at the IWS Tag Team Championship on May 30, 2009, at IWS' 10th Anniversary Show. However, in the end The Untouchables (Don Paysan and James Stone) were able to retain the titles and as a result 2.0 could no longer team in IWS.

After the break-up Matthews dubbed himself Canada's greatest athlete and started a singles career, while Jagged went on to replace injured IWS Tag Team Champion James Stone and formed the tag team The Untouchables 2.0 with former rival Don Paysan. In their first match together Jagged and Paysan lost the IWS Tag Team Championship to the Rock N' Roid Express (Franky the Mobster and Twiggy). However, both men's singles careers were cut short and the break-up stipulation was waived, when IWS announced it would hold its final show on October 9, 2010, where 2.0 would re-form to face longtime rivals the Super Smash Bros. in a tag team match. At the event 2.0 defeated the Super Smash Bros. to end their IWS careers on a high note.

When IWS returned in 2014, Matthews and Parker once again became part of the promotion's roster. On May 28, 2016, at Bloodstream Vol. 2, Parker defeated Shayne Hawke for the IWS Canadian Championship. On February 4, 2017, at Freedom To Fight, Parker defeated Black Dynomite in an IWS Championship Unification Match. At Season's Beatings on December 2, 2017, Big Magic won the IWS World Heavyweight Championship in a 4-Way Elimination Match. On April 28, 2018, at Unstoppable, TDT and Buxx Belmar defeated Les Brasseurs with Parker and British Strong Style.

On March 12, 2022, IWS presented Un F'N Sanctioned Part 2.0 at MTelus, featuring the return of 2.0 (representing the Jericho Appreciation Society).

=== Chikara ===
==== 2.0 (2006–2009) ====
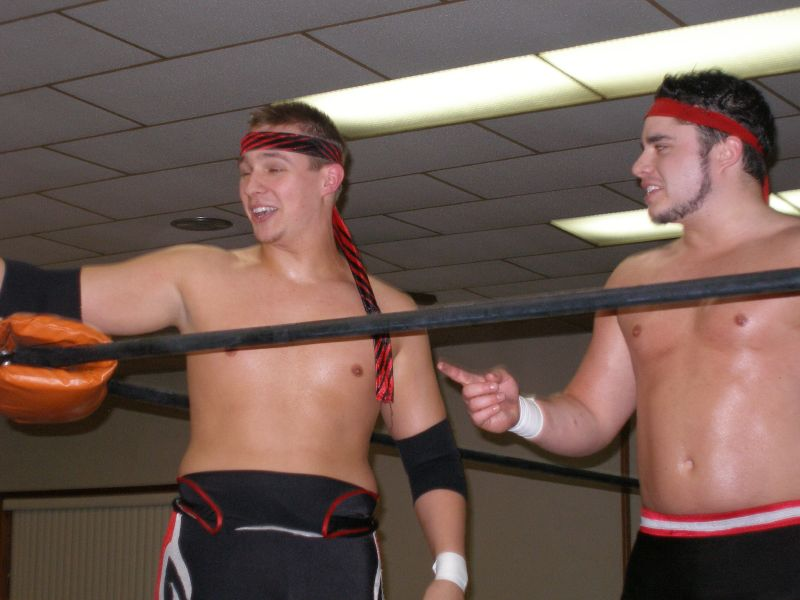
Jagged and Shane Matthews in February 2007

Jagged and Shane Matthews made their debuts as rudos (heels) for Philadelphia-based Chikara on February 25, 2006, taking part in the 2006 Tag World Grand Prix, losing to Men@Work (Mister ZERO and Shane Storm) in the first round of the tournament. After taking part in a tag team gauntlet match at Aniversario Delta in May, Matthews suffered an injury that would sideline him for eight months, leaving Jagged to wrestle singles matches against the likes of Equinox, Twiggy and Player Uno. Matthews returned to the promotion in February to team with Jagged and Young Lions Cup Champion Maxime Boyer as Team Canada in the 2007 King of Trios, but the team was eliminated from the tournament in the first round by the eventual winners of the entire tournament, Mike Quackenbush, Jigsaw and Shane Storm. On March 23, 2007, 2.0 picked up their first tag team victory in Chikara, defeating BLKOUT (Joker and Sabian). Despite being rudos, 2.0 quickly gained a cult following due to their entertaining promos and comedic behaviour, but were unable to win another match in 21 months. Their long losing streak finally came to an end on April 25, 2009, when they defeated Incoherence (Hallowicked and Frightmare) in a tag team match, thanks to an interference from Brodie Lee, who was feuding with Hallowicked at the time. However, on May 23 Incoherence defeated 2.0 in a rematch. After the loss Jagged and Matthews declared that they would give no more interviews until they were able to pick up their first point. In Chikara tag teams need three points (three straight victories) to become eligible to challenge for the promotion's tag team championship, the Campeonatos de Parejas. This didn't take long, as the very next day 2.0 scored a victory over the Sea Donsters (Hydra and Tim Donst). On June 12 Jagged and Matthews defeated Atsushi Ohashi and Mototsugu Shimizu during Chikara's tour with Big Japan Pro Wrestling in Saitama, Japan, but failed to pick up their third point the following day, when they were defeated by Ryuichi Kawakami and Yoshihito Sasaki in Tokyo, Japan.

==== The Badd Boyz (2009–2010) ====
After losing another match against The Colony (Fire Ant and Soldier Ant) on August 14, 2009, Chikara witnessed the debut of The Badd Boyz, with Jagged renaming himself Chad Badd and Matthews Brad Badd, adopting the gimmick of tough bikers, one that they had previously used in Inter Species Wrestling. Despite not trying to hide their true identities at all, The Badd Boyz were billed as a completely new tag team and there were no references made to the similarities between them and 2.0, who also kept appearing in Chikara. In their first Chikara match, The Badd Boyz defeated Fire Ant and Soldier Ant on September 12. On November 21 The Badd Boyz defeated The Future is Now (Helios and Lince Dorado), but on February 28, 2010, once again failed in their attempt to earn a championship match. Chikara's Director of Fun Dieter VonSteigerwalt, however, was not amused by The Badd Boyz's antics and booked them in a Loser Leaves Town match against 2.0 for March 20, 2010. The Badd Boyz won the match via countout, when 2.0 didn't show up. After the match The Badd Boyz revealed that they had been 2.0 all along and announced that from now on the new and improved version of the team would be known as 3.0. With the announcement, 3.0 turned tecnico (face), while Jagged adopted the new ring name Scott "Jagged" Parker.

==== 3.0 (2010–2014, 2015) ====
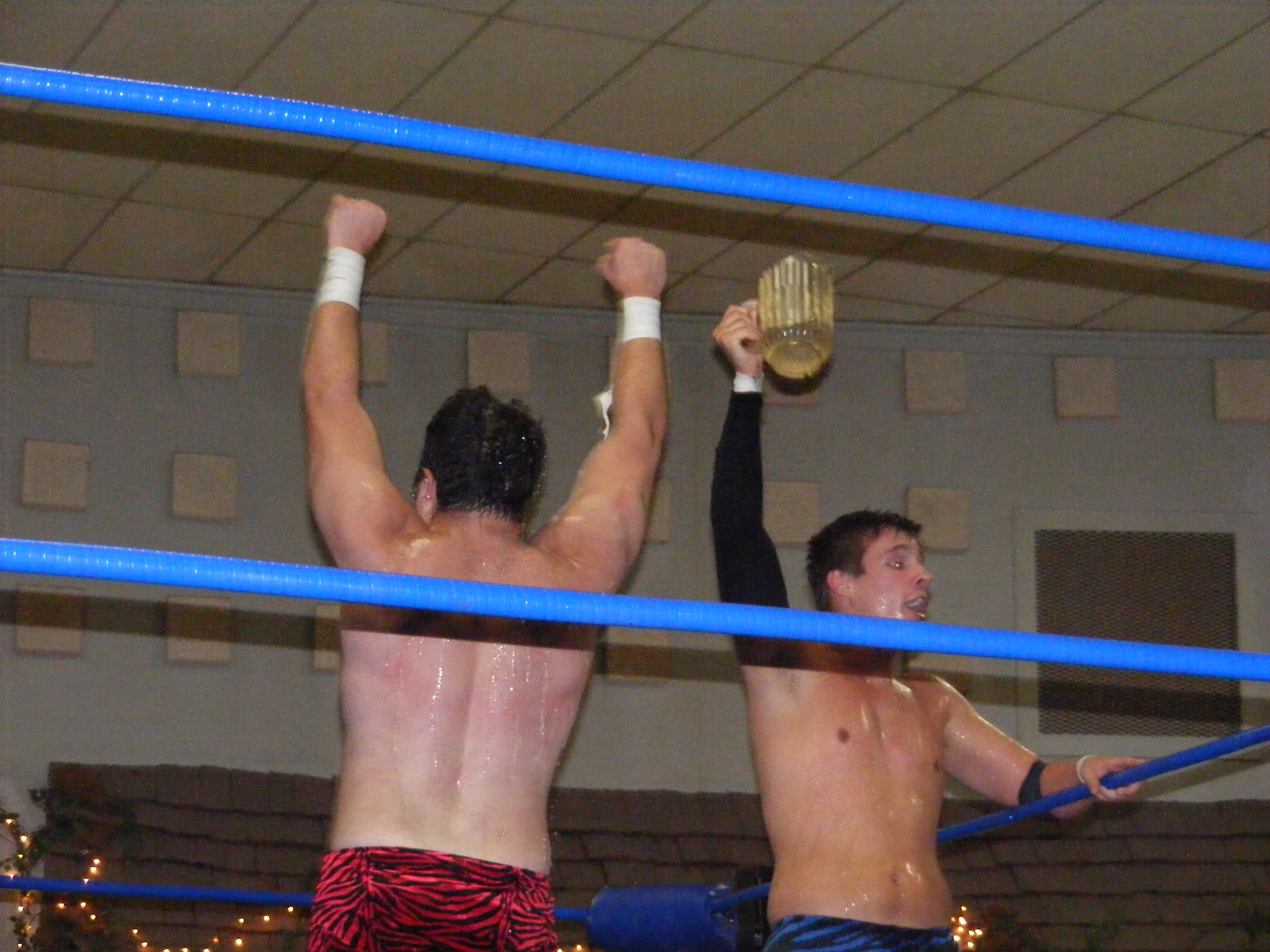
Matthews and Parker celebrating their third point on August 29, 2010

On June 27 3.0 picked up their first point by defeating F.I.S.T. (Chuck Taylor and Icarus) and followed that up with a victory over the Super Smash Bros. (Player Uno and Player Dos) on August 28. The following day 3.0 defeated the House of Truth (Christian Abel and Josh Raymond) to earn their third point and first shot at the Campeonatos de Parejas. Parker and Matthews received their shot at the following event on September 18, 2010, in a Chikara tradition, a Two Out of Three Falls match, against the defending champions, Ares and Claudio Castagnoli of the Bruderschaft des Kreuzes (BDK). BDK won the first fall in quick fashion thanks to a pre-match assault from BDK member Delirious. However, Parker managed to tie the score by pinning Castagnoli with a flash roll-up, the first time BDK had dropped a fall in their title matches. Despite having the entire Chikara locker room by ringside cheering 3.0 on, BDK managed to win the third fall, when Castagnoli forced Matthews to submit with the Inverted Chikara Special, and retained the Campeonatos de Parejas. 3.0. earned another three points on February 20, 2011, in a four-way elimination tag team match, after eliminating Los Ice Creams (El Hijo del Ice Cream and Ice Cream Jr.), but lost the points after being eliminated themselves by BDK members Daizee Haze and Delirious, after a distraction from the UnStable (Vin Gerard and STIGMA), from whom Parker and Matthews had earned their second point the previous day. For the 2011 King of Trios, 3.0 came together with El Generico to form ¡3.0lé!. On April 15, the team was eliminated from the tournament in the first round by The Osirian Portal (Amasis, Hieracon and Ophidian). On May 21, 3.0 ended their three-month-long feud with the UnStable by defeating them in a tag team match, where the losing team had to split up. In early 2012, 3.0 earned another shot at the Campeonatos de Parejas by picking up three points with victories over The Bravado Brothers (Harlem and Lancelot), BDK (Jakob Hammermeier and Tim Donst) and the Throwbacks (Dasher Hatfield and Mark Angelosetti). On March 24 in Vaughan, Ontario, 3.0 defeated F.I.S.T. (Chuck Taylor and Icarus) in the main event of Chikara's first ever event in Canada to become the new Campeones de Parejas. On April 29, 3.0 lost the Campeonatos de Parejas back to F.I.S.T. in their first title defense, ending the team's reign at just 36 days. Following their title loss, 3.0 started feuding with the Bravado Brothers, who were blamed for injuring Parker's rib prior to the loss. The rivalry built to a grudge match on June 23, where 3.0 was victorious, earning their second point in the process. Also in June, 3.0 began regularly teaming with Gran Akuma in six man tag team matches. On August 17, 3.0 earned their third point by eliminating Arik Cannon and Darin Corbin from a four tag team elimination match. However, later that same match, the Bravado Brothers eliminated 3.0, costing their rival team all of their points and a match for the Campeonatos de Parejas. On September 14, 3.0 and Gran Akuma entered the 2012 King of Trios tournament, but were eliminated in their first round match by The Batiri (Kobald, Kodama and Obariyon).

On December 2, 3.0 made their pay-per-view debuts at Under the Hood, Chikara's third internet pay-per-view, where they defeated F.I.S.T. (Chuck Taylor and Johnny Gargano) to earn their third point and a shot at the Campeonatos de Parejas. On February 10, 2013, 3.0 defeated The Young Bucks (Matt Jackson and Nick Jackson) to win the Campeonatos de Parejas for the second time. 3.0 made their first successful title defense on March 8 against the Devastation Corporation (Blaster McMassive and Max Smashmaster). Their second successful title defense took place on May 4, when they defeated Kodama and Obariyon of The Batiri. On June 2 at Aniversario: Never Compromise, 3.0 lost the Campeonatos de Parejas to Pieces of Hate (Jigsaw and The Shard) in their third defense. Following the event, Chikara went inactive for eight months during a storyline, which saw a united group of rudos from the promotion's past trying to kill it off. The storyline culminated on February 1, 2014, when the Chikara roster defeated the group in a mass brawl, following the late arrival of 3.0 with Archibald Peck, leading to the promotion announcing its return. In September, 3.0 teamed up with Peck for the 2014 King of Trios. The team made it to the semifinals of the tournament, before losing to the eventual tournament winners, the Devastation Corporation (Blaster McMassive, Flex Rumblecrunch and Max Smashmaster). After obtaining another three points, 3.0 received a shot at the Campeonatos de Parejas on November 16, but were defeated by the defending champions, The Throwbacks.

Following the unsuccessful title challenge, 3.0 did not wrestle another match for Chikara in ten months. They returned on September 5, 2015, when they teamed with N_R_G (Hype Rockwell and Race Jaxon) in an eight-man tag team match, where they defeated The Colony: Xtreme Force (Arctic Rescue Ant and Orbit Adventure Ant) and the Flying Francis (Branden O'Connor and Matt Novak).

=== Ring of Honor (2012, 2013) ===
On October 6, 2012, 3.0 made their Ring of Honor (ROH) debuts in a losing effort against the Bravado Brothers. On July 17, 2013, ROH announced that 3.0 would be returning to the promotion on July 27.

=== WWE (2016–2021) ===
On April 27, 2016, 3.0, billed under their real names of Jeff Parker and Matt Lee, made their debut for WWE's developmental branch NXT, losing to The Revival (Dash Wilder and Scott Dawson). On September 29, Parker and Lee were part of a group of about 40 wrestlers invited to a tryout at the WWE Performance Center. 3.0 made an appearance as enhancement talents playing two French-Canadians local competitors named Jean-Paul and François on the April 30, 2018 episode of Raw, losing to the Authors of Pain.

On January 22, 2019, it was leaked that 3.0 had signed a contract with WWE. On February 11, 2019, the WWE announced that Parker and Lee were part of the newly signed recruits at the WWE Performance Centre in Orlando, Florida. Team 3.0 was performing at NXT house shows across Florida, since their debut in Venice, Florida on March 8, 2019. May 1, 2019, Team 3.0 performed in a dark match before the NXT taping at Full Sail University. Team 3.0 was re-branded as Chase Parker and Matt Martel on the September 4, 2019 episode of NXT, in a losing effort against Tyler Breeze and Fandango. On the September 25 episode of NXT, the duo now dubbed "Ever-Rise" faced Oney Lorcan and Danny Burch in a losing effort, and again to Rinku Singh and Saurav Gurjar. On May 22, 2020, they made their debut on 205 Live once again losing to Lorcan and Burch. Ever-Rise picked up their first victory in WWE on the June 12 episode of 205 Live when they defeated Leon Ruff and Adrian Alanis, establishing themselves as heels in the process. Following this, Ever-Rise would become regulars on 205 Live and would make occasional appearances on NXT. In early 2021, Ever-Rise took part in the 2021 Dusty Rhodes Tag Team Classic but were eliminated in the first round by the Grizzled Young Veterans.

On June 25, 2021, Ever-Rise were released from their WWE contracts.

=== All Elite Wrestling (2021–present) ===
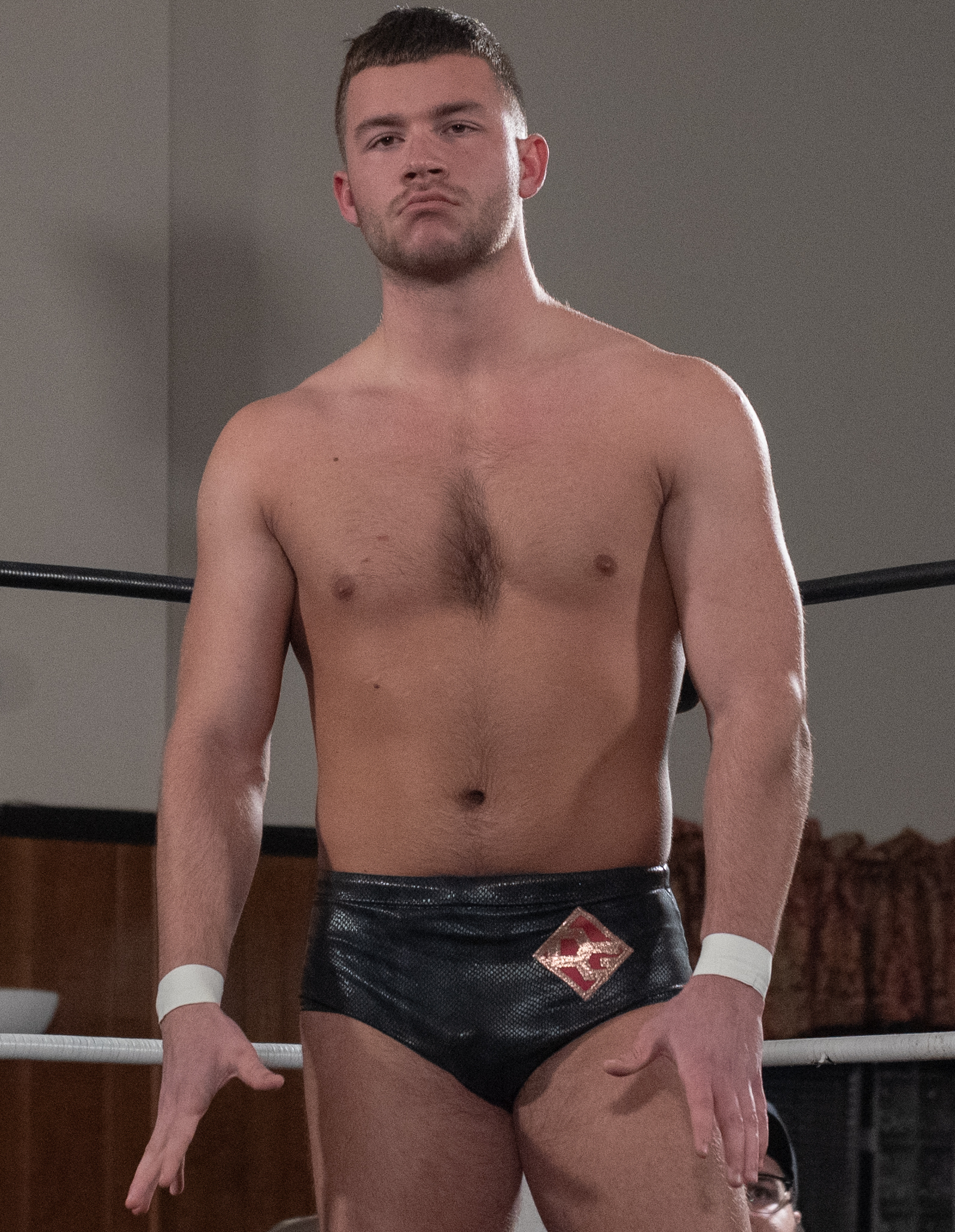
Throughout their time in AEW, Parker and Menard have been presented as the onscreen mentors of Daniel Garcia.

On August 4, 2021, 2.0 made their All Elite Wrestling debut at the 2021 Homecoming event, teaming with Daniel Garcia against Jon Moxley, Eddie Kingston and Darby Allin in a losing effort. On the August 10 episode of AEW Dark, 2.0 defeated Adrian Alanis and Liam Gray earning their first victory. On the August 18 episode of AEW Dynamite, 2.0 faced Darby Allin and Sting in a Texas Tornado match where they were defeated. The following day, on August 19, it was announced that 2.0 had officially signed with AEW making them full time members of the AEW roster. On the March 9, 2022 episode of Dynamite, 2.0 and Daniel Garcia attacked Eddie Kingston and formed a new stable with Chris Jericho and Jake Hager called the Jericho Appreciation Society changing their ring names to "Daddy Magic" Matt Menard and "Cool Hand" Angelo Parker.

In July 2023, Don Callis began tempting Jericho to join his new "Callis Family" stable, which eventually culminated in the JAS splitting up and Parker, Menard and Garcia branching off as their own group once again. The trio challenged Billy Gunn and the Acclaimed for the AEW World Trios Championship on two occasions, but were defeated both times.

== Championships and accomplishments ==
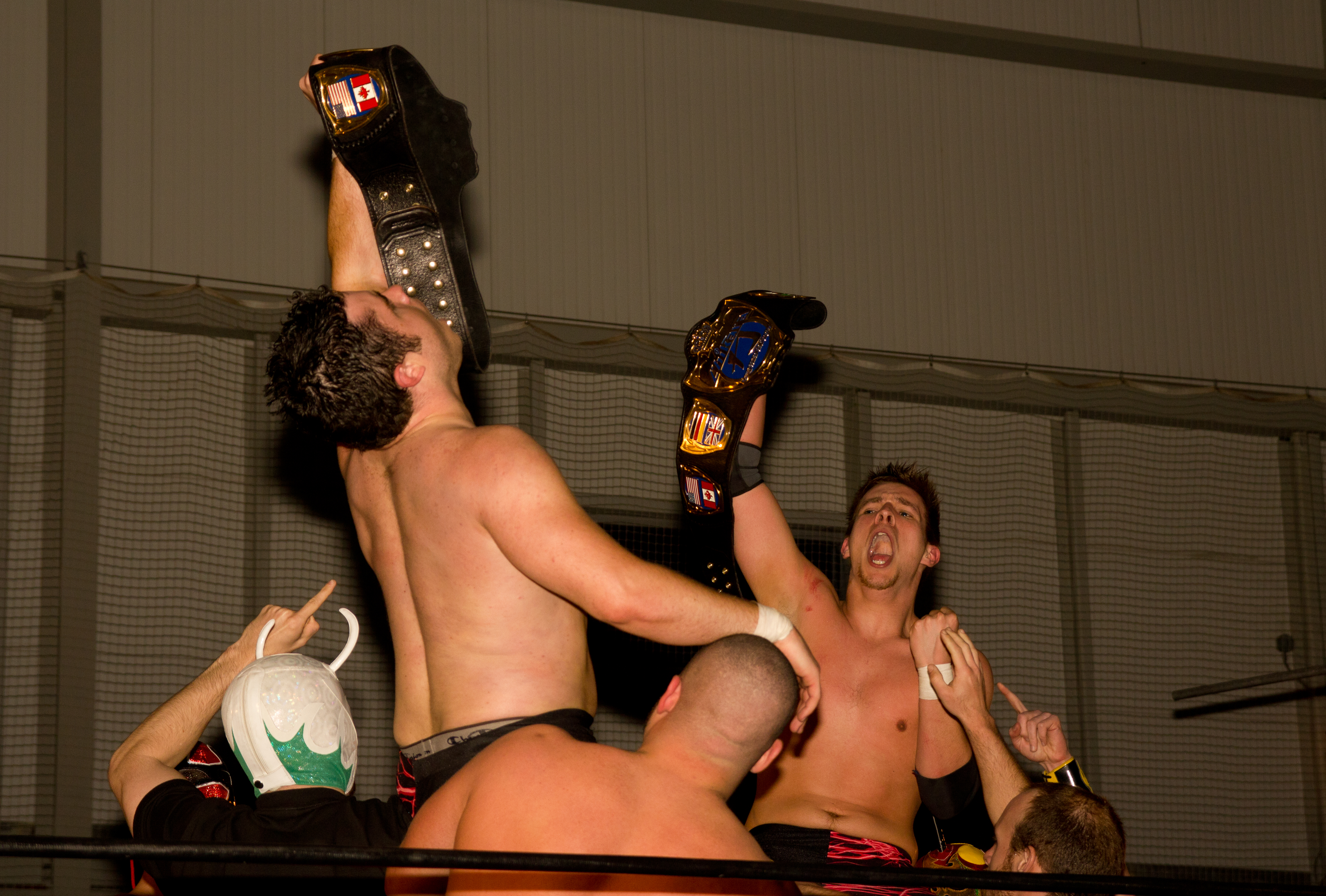
Matthews and Parker with the Chikara Campeonatos de Parejas belts

- Chikara
  - Chikara Campeonatos de Parejas (2 times)
- Combat Revolution Wrestling
  - CRW Tag Team Championship (1 time)
- International Wrestling Syndicate
  - IWS Canadian Championship (2 times) – Parker
  - IWS World Heavyweight Championship (2 times) – Parker (1) and Big Magic (1)
  - IWS World Tag Team Championship (2 times)
- North Shore Pro Wrestling
  - NSPW Tag Team Championship (1 time)
- Northern Championship Wrestling
  - NCW Tag Team Championship (2 times)
- Pro Wrestling Illustrated
  - Ranked Matthews No. 266 of the top 500 singles wrestlers in the PWI 500 in 2013
  - Ranked Parker No. 277 of the top 500 singles wrestlers in the PWI 500 in 2013
- Wrestling is Awesome
  - WiA Heavyweight Championship (1 time) – Parker
  - WiA Heavyweight Championship Tournament (2013) – Parker
