= Pierre Baillargeon =

Quebec writer

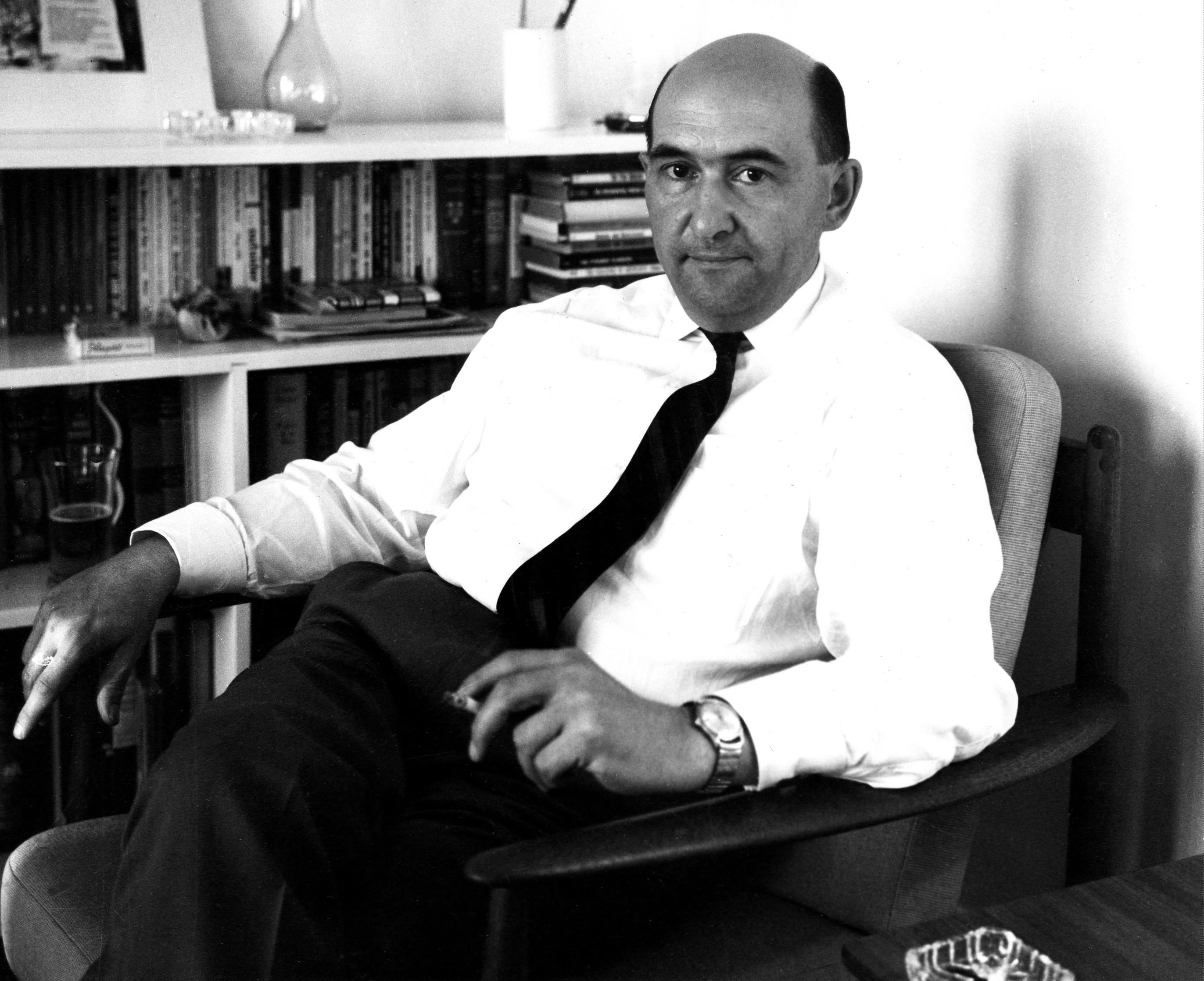
- Born: September 10, 1916; Montreal, Quebec
- Died: August 15, 1967 (aged 50); Rochester, Minnesota
- Occupation: Writer
- Spouse: Jacqueline Mabit (m. 1939)
- Children: 4
- Writing career
- Period: 20th century
- Genres: History, fiction

Pierre Baillargeon (September 10, 1916 – August 15, 1967) was a French-Canadian journalist, novelist, and poet.

== Biography ==
Baillargeon was born in Montreal, Quebec in 1916. His father Oliva Baillargeon was a political organizer and his mother was Alphonsine Mercier. He studied with the Clerics of Saint-Viateur and at the Collège Jean-de-Brébeuf between 1929 and 1938, then in France at the Faculty of Medicine. It was in France that he met Jacqueline Mabit whom he married in 1939. They later had four children.

He returned to Quebec in 1940 due to ill-health and the German invasion of France. He worked as a translator for the Royal Canadian Air Force and founded the journal Amérique française, of which he was director until 1943.

In 1942, he became a journalist for La Patrie. He returned to France and stayed there from 1949 to 1959. He continued to work for La Nouvelle Relève, La Presse, La Patrie and Le Devoir. He also wrote an article on Jacques Chevalier in the newspaper La Patrie on April 5, 1959, entitled "Visite à Jacques Chevalier" (Visit to Jacques Chevalier), which evokes his visit to the philosopher's home in rue Pierre-Leroux in Paris; it was reprinted in the Cahiers bourbonnais in the 3rd quarter of 1962, following Chevalier's death.

Baillargeon died while undergoing heart surgery, August 15, 1967, in Rochester, Minnesota.

== Works ==
- La Neige et le Feu, (1948)
- Le scandale est nécessaire, (1962)

=== Essays ===
- Hasard et moi, (1940)
- Églogues, (1943) with Jean Papineau-Couture and Jacques de Tonnancour
- Les Médisances de Claude Perrin, (1945)
- Commerce, (1947)

=== Plays ===
- Madame Homère, (1963)

=== Collections ===
- Le Choix, (1969) edited by Robert Bernier
