= Mike Bailey (wrestler) =

Canadian professional wrestler (born 1990)

- Bailey in September 2025

Personal information
- Born: Émile Charles Baillargeon-Laberge; July 16, 1990 (age 36) Laval, Quebec, Canada
- Spouse: Veda Scott (m. 2022)

Professional wrestling career
- Ring name(s): Kitsune; Mike Bailey; Mike Sydal; Speedball
- Billed height: 1.73 m (5 ft 8 in)
- Billed weight: 79 kg (174 lb)
- Trained by: Fred La Merveille; Lex Lerman
- Debut: 2006

Émile Charles Baillargeon-Laberge (born July 16, 1990), better known by his (Note: Baillargeon-Laberge uses he/him and they/them pronouns. This article uses he/him pronouns for consistency.) ring name Mike Bailey, is a Canadian professional wrestler. He is signed to All Elite Wrestling (AEW), where he is a member of the United Empire and a former two-time AEW World Trios Champion.

He is also known for his work in Total Nonstop Action Wrestling (TNA), where he was a three-time TNA X Division Champion, and in AEW partner promotions New Japan Pro-Wrestling (NJPW) and Consejo Mundial de Lucha Libre (CMLL). He is a former two time IWS World Heavyweight Champion and a former two-time KO-D Tag Team Champion. Bailey was also the winner of Combat Zone Wrestling's 2015 Best of the Best, DDT Pro-Wrestling's 2016 DNA Grand Prix, Revolution Pro Wrestling's 2021 British J-Cup and Pro Wrestling Guerrilla's 2023 Battle of Los Angeles tournaments.

== Professional wrestling career ==
=== Independent circuit (2006–present) ===
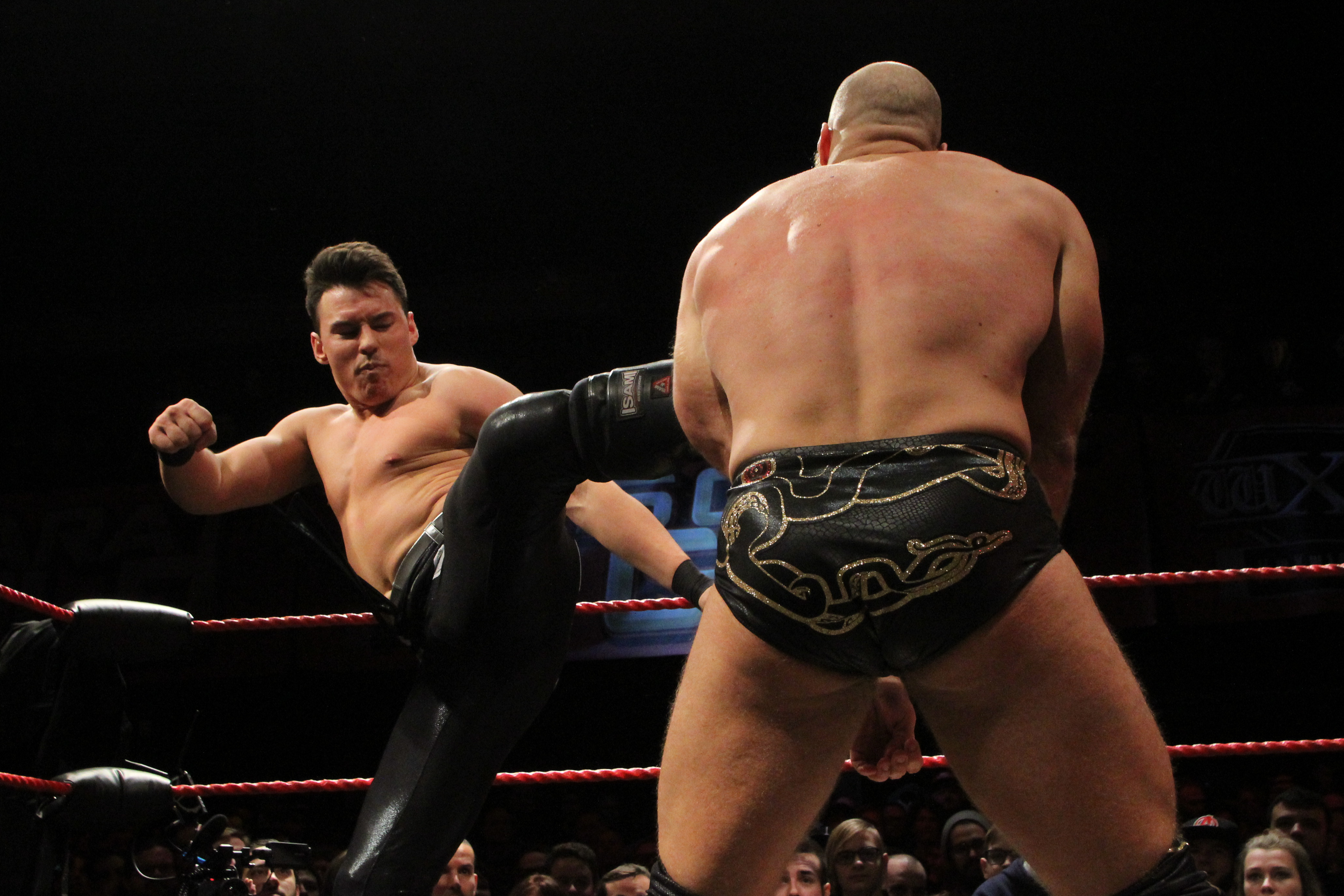
Bailey facing Jurn Simmons at wXw 16 Carat Gold 2020

Baillargeon-Laberge made his professional wrestling debut in 2006 under the ring name Mike Sydal before adopting the name Mike Bailey and the nickname "Speedball." He competed extensively on the Canadian independent wrestling scene, particularly for IWS and Capital City Championship Combat (C4), where he won the C4 Tag Team Championship with Kevin Steen in 2011 and the C4 Championship in 2013. In 2014, Bailey captured the IWS World Heavyweight Championship, establishing himself as one of Canada's top independent wrestlers.

Between 2014 and 2016, Bailey expanded internationally, wrestling for promotions including Combat Zone Wrestling (CZW), Pro Wrestling Guerrilla (PWG), Revolution Pro Wrestling (RevPro), and Westside Xtreme Wrestling (wXw). He competed in the PWG Battle of Los Angeles tournament, reaching the 2015 final, and challenged for several championships across North America and Europe. In early 2016, Bailey was barred from wrestling in the United States for five years because he lacked a proper work visa, leading him to focus primarily on promotions in Canada and Europe. From 2016 to 2020, Bailey remained active in RevPro, wXw, Progress Wrestling, Ring of Honor (ROH), and other promotions. During this period he competed in multiple tournaments, challenged for championships, and won the SWE Tag Team Championship alongside Mao. He also continued wrestling for IWS, where he remained a featured performer.

In 2021, he regained the IWS World Heavyweight Championship, won a second C4 Championship, captured the C4 Underground Championship, and won the 2021 British J-Cup tournament. He returned to PWG in 2022, reaching the final of the Battle of Los Angeles tournament before losing to Daniel Garcia. Bailey has taught seminars and until moving to the United States, was part of the IWS Training Centre coaching staff.

In 2023, Bailey won the Battle of Los Angeles tournament by defeating Jordynne Grace, Shun Skywalker, Bryan Keith, and Konosuke Takeshita, earning a PWG World Championship opportunity against Daniel Garcia, which he lost in sudden-death overtime following a sixty-minute Iron Man match. In 2024, he debuted for Maple Leaf Pro Wrestling (MLP) at their two-night event Forged In Excellence, losing to Konosuke Takeshita on the first night before defeating El Phantasmo on the second.

=== DDT Pro-Wrestling (2016–2020) ===
Bailey debuted for DDT Pro-Wrestling on August 1, 2016, for DDT's Tavern Pro Wrestling brand, at Drunkers Kingdom: Most Drunk in Tavern's History For 3 Days!!, losing to Isami Kodaka. He often wrestled alongside members of the Happy Motel stable Konosuke Takeshita and Antonio Honda without being part of the group. They challenged Damnation (Daisuke Sasaki, Mad Paulie and Tetsuya Endo) for the KO-D 6-Man Tag Team Championship at Sapporo Wrestling Festa: DDT Crab on October 10, 2016, but were unsuccessful. Later that month, Bailey took part in the DNA Grand Prix, where he advanced to the finals after winning his block with a record of five wins and one loss. In the finals, he defeated Kazusada Higuchi and earned a one-way plane ticket to New York which he refused and gave to Higuchi instead. Bailey captured his first title in DDT, the KO-D Tag Team Championship, by teaming up with Konosuke Takeshita at Osaka Octopus 2016 on December 4, to defeat Damnation (Daisuke Sasaki and Tetsuya Endo).

They dropped the titles to Masakatsu Funaki and Yukio Sakaguchi at Road to Super Arena in Oyodo on January 9, 2017. Bailey entered the 2017 King of DDT Tournament on June 2, but was eliminated in the first round by Tetsuya Endo. On July 2 at Hello From Shinjuku Village 2017, he unsuccessfully challenged Konosuke Takeshita for the KO-D Openweight Championship.

He won the KO-D Tag Team Championship for the second time by teaming with Mao as a part of the Moonlight Express on July 22, 2018, at Summer Vacation 2018, where they defeated Damnation (Mad Paulie and Tetsuya Endo). Bailey unsuccessfully challenged Harashima for the KO-D Openweight Championship at New Year Lottery Special! on January 3, 2017. He is a former Ironman Heavymetalweight Champion, title which he won in the block B of the D-Oh Grand Prix 2019 tournament show from November 30, 2018, where he defeated Konosuke Takeshita. Bailey participated in comedic matches such as a five-way loser explosion weapon rumble tag team match at Judgement 2018: DDT 21st Anniversary on March 25, where he teamed up with Mao to defeat Michael Nakazawa and Chinsuke Nakamura, Isami Kodaka and Fuminori Abe, Sanshiro Takagi and Ippanjin Munenori Sawa, and Smile Squash (Yuko Miyamoto and Soma Takao).

=== Impact Wrestling / Total Nonstop Action Wrestling (2021–2024) ===
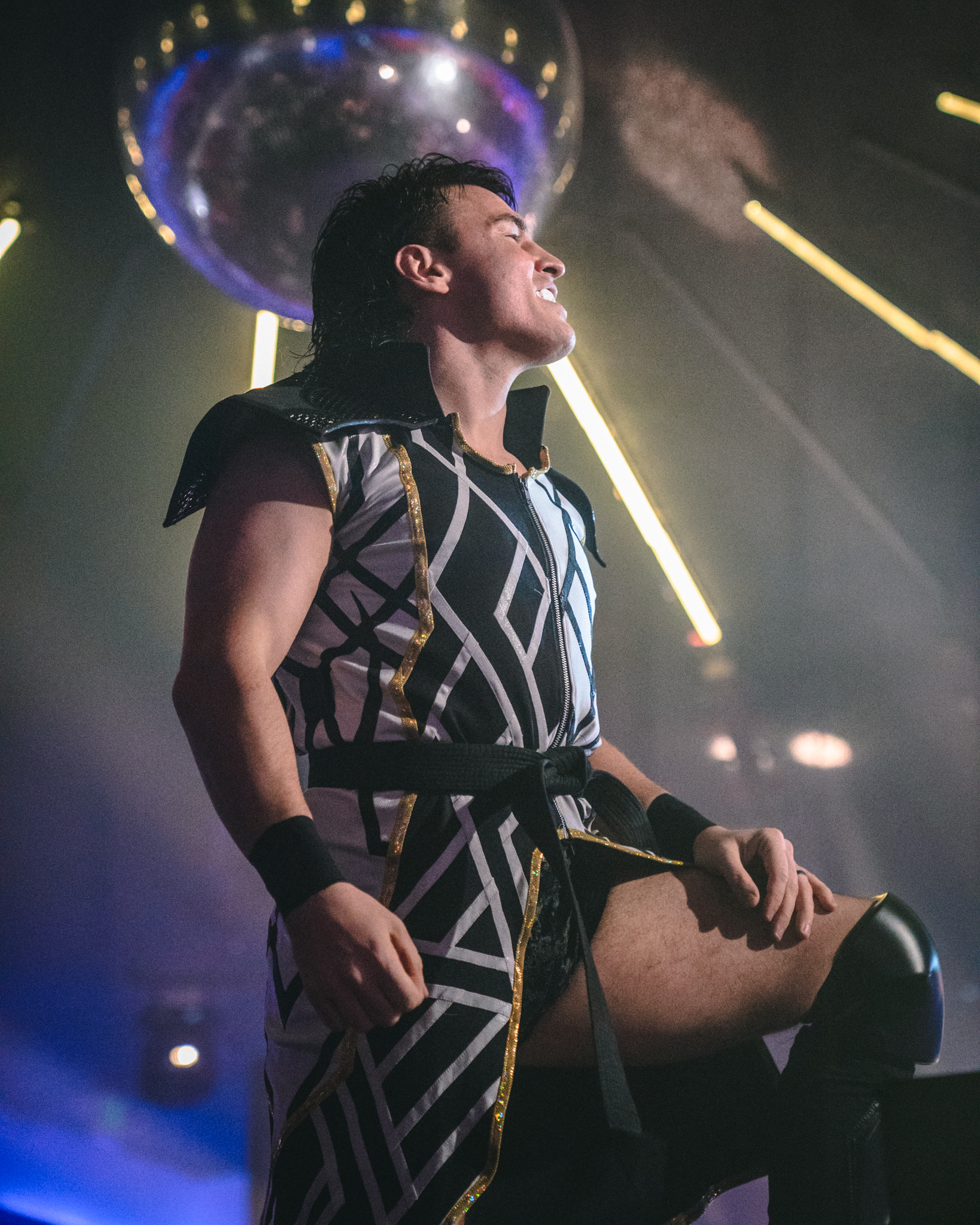
Bailey in 2024

On October 31, 2021, Bailey signed a contract with Impact Wrestling, offered by Impact executive Scott D'Amore after their match against Josh Alexander at Destiny Wrestling's Raising Hell. Bailey competed on the Hard To Kill pre-show in their debut match in Impact, winning a four-way match against Ace Austin, Laredo Kid, and Chris Bey.

On June 19, 2022, Mike Bailey defeated Ace Austin, Alex Zayne, Andrew Everett, Kenny King, and Trey Miguel in a 6-man Ultimate X match for the X Division Championship to become Impact X Division Champion for their first time at Impact's Slammiversary 2022. At Against All Odds, Bailey defeated Trey Miguel to retain the title. At Emergence, Bailey defeated Jack Evans to retain the title. At Victory Road, Bailey defeated Delirious to retain the title. Afterwards, Bailey lost the X Division title to Frankie Kazarian at Impact's Bound for Glory 2022 via submission.

At Slammiversary, Bailey defeated Mustafa Ali to win the X-Division Championship for the second time. At Emergence, Bailey lost the title to Zachary Wentz in a Ultimate X match. At Victory Road on September 13, Bailey defeated Wentz to win the TNA X Division Championship for the third time. At Bound for Glory, Bailey defeated El Hijo del Vikingo to retain the title. On the November 7 episode of Impact!, Bailey lost the title to Moose. A week later, it was reported Bailey's contract had expired and his profile was removed from TNA's official website, ending his tenure with the promotion.

=== New Japan Pro-Wrestling (2023) ===
On April 27, 2023, Bailey was announced as an entrant in New Japan Pro-Wrestling's Best of the Super Juniors 30 tournament, competing in the A Block. In his first tournament match, Bailey defeated IWGP Junior Heavyweight Champion and four-time tournament winner, Hiromu Takahashi. Bailey scored 14 points in the tournament, topping the A Block and advancing to the semi-finals. In the semi-final round, Bailey was defeated by Master Wato. On August 19, Bailey was announced as one of four participants for One-Night All Star Jr. USA tournament which was held as part of All Star Jr. Festival USA 2023 event in Philadelphia. He defeated Francesco Akira in semifinal and Kevin Knight in the final to win the tournament. On October 9 of Destruction event in Ryogoku Sumo Hall, Tokyo, he unsuccessfully challenged Hiromu for the IWGP Junior Heavyweight Championship in a three-way match that also included YOH. On November 10 at Lonestar Shootout, Bailey unsuccessfully challenged Zack Sabre Jr. for the NJPW World Television Championship.

=== All Elite Wrestling (2025–present) ===
==== JetSpeed (2025–2026) ====
On the February 22, 2025 episode of Collision, a video aired teasing Bailey's debut in All Elite Wrestling (AEW). He made his debut on the March 12 episode of Dynamite, defeating The Beast Mortos in the semi-final of the AEW International Championship eliminator tournament, advancing to the four-way grand final. The following week, both Bailey and Ricochet pinned Mark Davis to win the match, meaning that both wrestlers would challenge Kenny Omega for the International Championship on April 6 at Dynasty in a three-way match. At the event, Omega retained the title against both Bailey and Ricochet. On May 25 at Double or Nothing, Bailey unsuccessfully challenged Kazuchika Okada for the AEW Continental Championship. After Double or Nothing, Bailey formed a tag team with Kevin Knight, known as "JetSpeed". JetSpeed would go on to challenge for the AEW World Tag Team Championship on two occasions, once on July 12 at All In and another on September 20 at All Out, but failed to win both matches. On November 24, Bailey was announced as a participant in the 2025 Continental Classic, where he was placed in the Gold League. Bailey finished the tournament with 6 points, but failed advanced to the semi-finals.

On the January 14, 2026 taping of Collision: Maximum Carnage, JetSpeed teamed with "Hangman" Adam Page to defeat The Opps (Samoa Joe, Powerhouse Hobbs, and Katsuyori Shibata) and win the AEW World Trios Championship, marking Bailey's first championship in AEW. AEW officially began recognizing this reign when the episode aired on tape delay on January 17. The trio of JetSpeed and Page were officially named "Jet Set Rodeo". The team lost the AEW World Trios Championship on the March 4 episode of Dynamite to Don Callis Family (Kazuchika Okada, Kyle Fletcher, and Mark Davis) after interference from MJF, ending their reign at 49 days (46 days as recognized by AEW). JetSpeed, this time with Místico, regained the Trios Championship from Don Callis Family at Revolution on March 15. On the April 8 tapings of Collision (aired on April 11), JetSpeed and Místico lost their titles to The Dogs (David Finlay, Clark Connors, and Gabe Kidd), ending their reign at 25 days (27 days as recognized by AEW). On the May 20 episode of Dynamite, Bailey unsuccessfully challenged Darby Allin for the AEW World Championship. Over the following weeks, JetSpeed would disband after Knight turned heel and Bailey would unsuccuessfully challenge him for the AEW TNT Championship.

==== United Empire (2026–present) ====
On July 26, 2026 at Redemption in his hometown of Montreal, Quebec, Bailey won a six-way ladder match to earn a shot at the International Championship and chose to invoke it for Grand Slam Mexico on August 5, but lost the title match against Kyle Fletcher. At All In on August 30, Bailey competed in the Casino Gauntlet match which was won by Andrade El Ídolo. On the September 23 episode of Dynamite, Bailey joined the AEW branch of the United Empire stable led by Will Ospreay. At Grand Slam France on October 6 (aired October 10), Bailey defeated Lee Moriarty to qualify for the Clockwork Carnage match for the AEW World Championship at WrestleDream. At the event on October 17, Bailey failed to win the title after being eliminated in the first stage by Konosuke Takeshita.

=== Consejo Mundial de Lucha Libre (2025–present) ===
Bailey made his debut for Consejo Mundial de Lucha Libre (CMLL) on August 29, 2025 at the International Grand Prix as part of Team World, where he lasted till the final two and was eliminated by Místico. On December 19 at Dream Match Friday, Bailey unsuccessfully challenged Máscara Dorada for the NWA World Historic Light Heavyweight Championship.

On the April 3, 2026 episode of Viernes Espectacular, JetSpeed and Místico successfully defended their AEW World Trios Championship against El Clon, Hechicero, and Volador Jr. of the Don Callis Family.

== Personal life ==
In March 2016, the Wrestling Observer Newsletter reported that Baillargeon-Laberge had been arrested while trying to get into the United States to compete for Evolve. He was subsequently banned from entering the country at all for the next five years. The Observer reported that he was in the process of obtaining a visa through Combat Zone Wrestling at the time of his ban, but the process was going extremely slowly and would have forced him to miss the Evolve booking.

Baillargeon-Laberge was the subject of the documentary film Keep It Kayfabe, which made its world premiere at San Diego Comic-Con in July 2025.

Baillargeon-Laberge is non-binary, and uses both he/him and they/them pronouns. He got engaged to American professional wrestler Veda Scott in November 2020. They were married in May 2022.

== Championships and accomplishments ==
- Active Advance Pro Wrestling/Kaientai Dojo
  - Strongest-K Tag Team Championship (1 time) – with Mao
- All Elite Wrestling
  - AEW World Trios Championship (2 times) – with Adam Page and Kevin Knight (2) and Místico
- Attack! Pro Wrestling
  - Attack! 24:7 Championship (2 times)
- Capital City Championship Combat
  - C4 Championship (2 times)
  - C4 Underground Championship (1 time)
  - C4 Tag Team Championship (1 time) – with Kevin Steen
  - Snowbrawl Tournament (2014)
- Combat Revolution Wrestling
  - CRW ITV Championship (1 time)
- Combat Zone Wrestling
  - Best of the Best 14 (2015)
- DDT Pro-Wrestling
  - Ironman Heavymetalweight Championship (1 time)
  - KO-D Tag Team Championship (2 times) – with Mao (1) and Konosuke Takeshita (1)
  - DNA Grand Prix (2016)
  - Grand Sumo Tournament (2019)
- Deadlock Pro-Wrestling
  - DPW Worlds Tag Team Championship (1 time) – with Jake Something

- DPW Awards (2 times)
  - Tag Team of the Year (2024) – with Jake Something
  - Match of the Year (2024) – with Jake Something vs. Violence Is Forever at 3rd Anniversary

- Hogtown Pro Wrestling
  - HPW Openweight Championship (1 time)
- Total Nonstop Action Wrestling/Impact Wrestling
  - TNA/Impact X Division Championship (3 times)
  - Gravy Train Turkey Trot (2023) – with Jake Something, Johnny Swinger, and PCO
  - Impact Year End Awards (4 times)
    - Two-time X Division Star of the Year (2022, 2023)
    - Match of the Year (2022) vs. Josh Alexander December 8 on Impact
    - Match of the Year (2023) vs. Will Ospreay at Bound for Glory
- International Wrestling Syndicate
  - IWS World Heavyweight Championship (2 times)
- Monteregie Wrestling Federation
  - MWF Junior Championship (1 time)
  - MWF Regional Championship (1 time)
  - MWF Tag Team Championship (1 time) – with Alex Silva
- New Japan Pro Wrestling
  - All Star Jr. Festival USA tournament (2023)
- North Shore Pro Wrestling
  - Standing 8 Tournament (2016)
- Pandemonium: Pro Wrestling
  - Pandemonium Pro Championship (1 time, inaugural)
  - Rumble Riot (2023)
- Pro Wrestling Guerrilla
  - Battle of Los Angeles (2023)
- Pro Wrestling Illustrated
  - Ranked No. 30 of the top 500 singles wrestlers in the PWI 500 in 2022
- Revolution Pro Wrestling/Southside Wrestling Entertainment
  - SWE Tag Team Championship (1 time) – with Mao
  - British J-Cup (2021)
- Smash Wrestling
  - The Northern Tournament (2019)
