= Daniel Garcia (wrestler) =

American professional wrestler (born 1998)

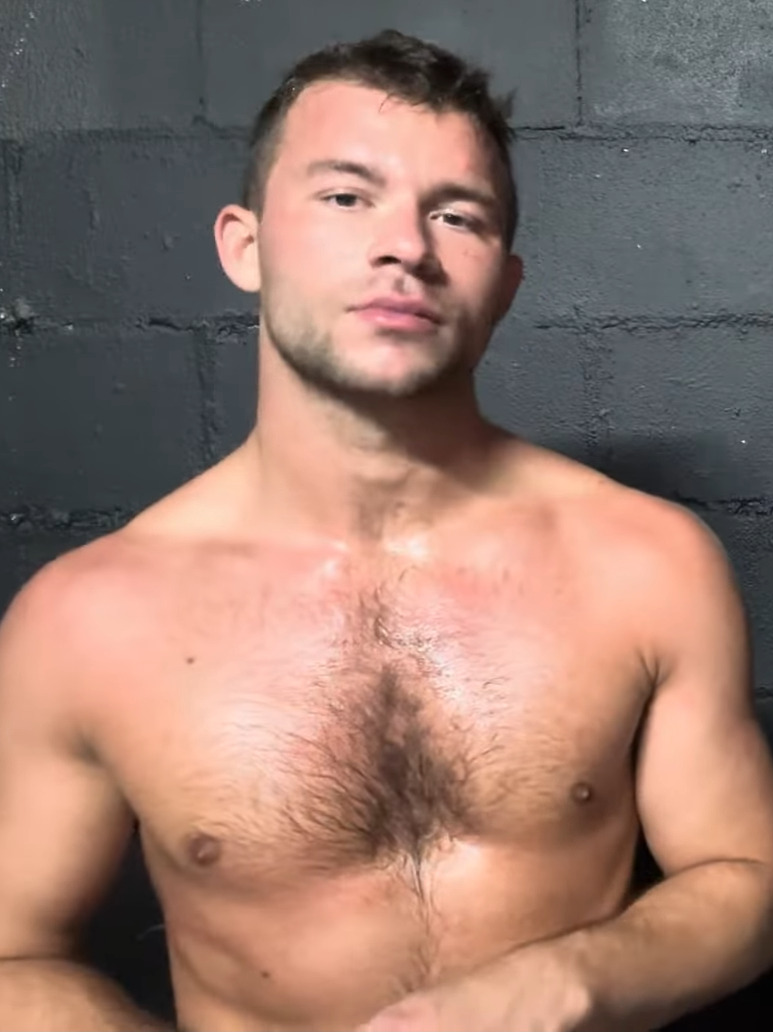
- Garcia in May 2024

Personal information
- Born: September 17, 1998 (age 28) Buffalo, New York, U.S.
- Education: Buffalo State College

Professional wrestling career
- Ring name(s): Daniel Garcia; Danny Garcia; Dante Rios
- Billed height: 6 ft 0 in (1.83 m)
- Billed weight: 187 lb (85 kg)
- Billed from: Buffalo, New York
- Trained by: Brandon Thurston; Grapplers Anonymous; Mikey Everynite; Pepper Parks
- Debut: 2017

Daniel Garcia (born September 17, 1998) is an American professional wrestler. He is signed to All Elite Wrestling (AEW), where he is a member of the Death Riders stable. He is a former AEW TNT Champion. He also makes appearances in AEW's sister-promotion Ring of Honor (ROH), where he is a former ROH Pure Champion, and for partner-promotion Consejo Mundial de Lucha Libre (CMLL).

== Professional wrestling career ==
=== Early career (2017–2021) ===
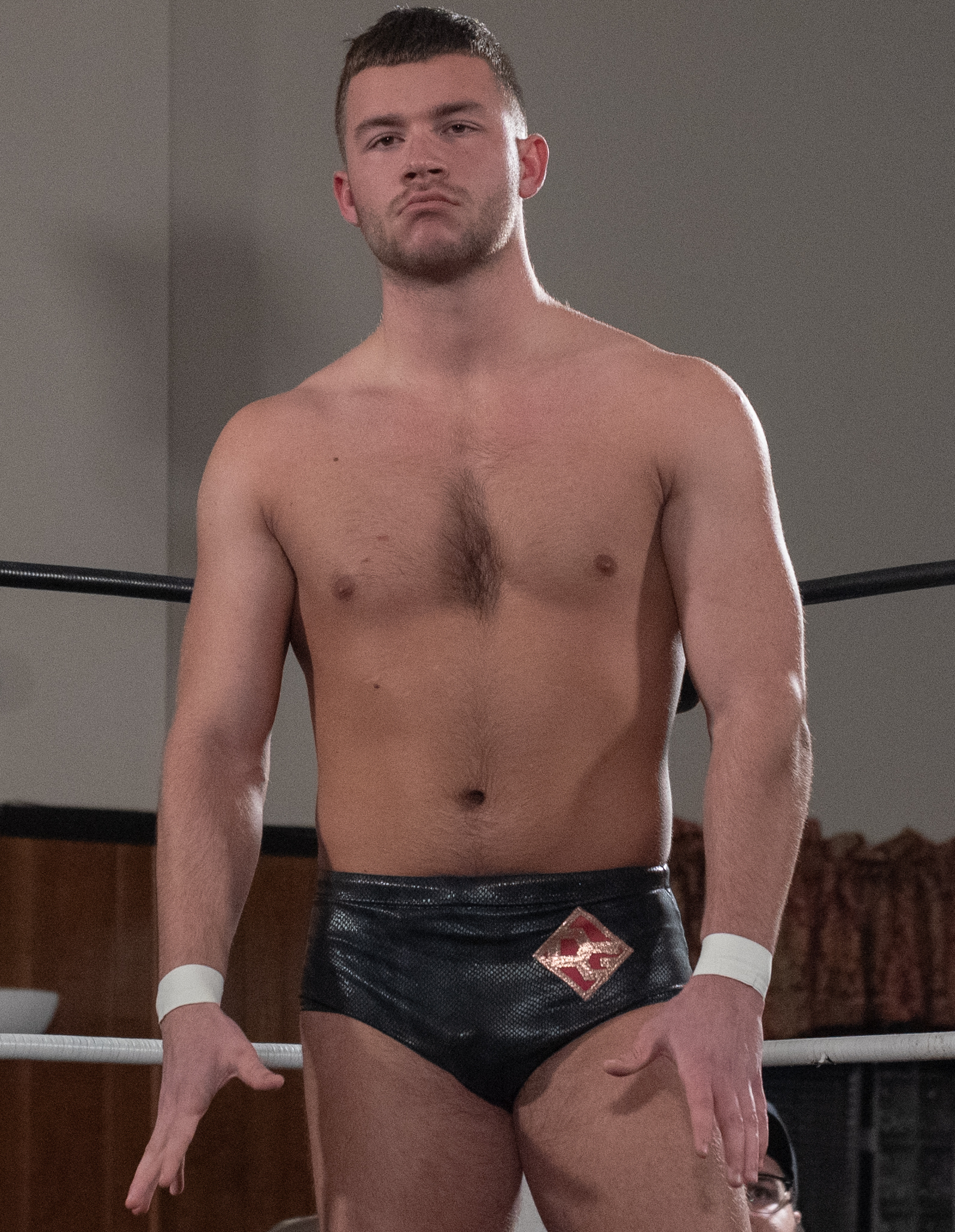
Garcia in 2019

Garcia began training under Grapplers Anonymous before debuting on the independent circuit in 2017. He competed regularly for Limitless Wrestling, where he won the Limitless World Championship in 2021. He also made appearances for WWE, facing Drew Gulak on 205 Live in 2018 and Tyler Rust on NXT in 2021.

=== All Elite Wrestling / Ring of Honor (2020–present) ===
==== Early beginnings and Jericho Appreciation Society (2020–2023) ====
Garcia made his All Elite Wrestling (AEW) debut on Dark in September 2020 and was officially signed in October 2021. Early in his run, he established himself as a heel and aligned with 2point0 (Matt Menard and Angelo Parker), forming a trio that regularly appeared on AEW programming. In March 2022, the group joined Chris Jericho and Jake Hager to form the Jericho Appreciation Society (JAS), a faction promoting a "sports entertainment" philosophy.

Later that year, the JAS entered into a feud with the Blackpool Combat Club (BCC), with BCC member Bryan Danielson encouraging Garcia to embrace his technical wrestling background and join the BCC. Although teased to leave the JAS, Garcia ultimately remained loyal to Jericho after attacking Danielson during the ROH World Championship match between Jericho and Danielson. At Double or Nothing on May 29, the JAS defeated the BCC, Eddie Kingston, Santana and Ortiz) in an Anarchy in the Arena match. The JAS would face the BCC Kingston, Santana and Ortiz, in a rematch in a Blood and Guts match at the eponymous event, but were defeated. On the September 7, 2022, episode of Dynamite, he defeated Wheeler Yuta to win the ROH Pure Championship, which he held for 94 days before losing it back to Yuta at Final Battle.

In 2023, Garcia unsuccessfully challenged for the AEW International Championship on multiple occasions, including a four-way match at Forbidden Door. He also reached the finals of the "Blind Eliminator" tag team tournament with Sammy Guevara, losing to MJF and Adam Cole. The JAS disbanded later that year, and Garcia resumed teaming with Menard and Parker, turning face.

==== Singles competition (2023–2025) ====
Following the breakup of the Jericho Appreciation Society, Garcia continued teaming with Matt Menard and Angelo Parker, with the trio unsuccessfully challenging for the AEW World Trios Championship on two occasions. Garcia later entered a brief program with MJF, culminating in an AEW World Championship match on the November 29, 2023, episode of Dynamite, which Garcia lost. Garcia was announced as a participant in the inaugural Continental Classic tournament. After a four-match losing streak, he earned a victory in his final bout against Brody King, finishing the tournament with three points.

In early 2024, Garcia aligned with FTR in a feud against the House of Black, earning a singles win over Buddy Matthews and later teaming with FTR in a victory over the group in an Escape The Cage Elimination match. He then entered a storyline pursuit of the TNT Championship, which led to a match against Christian Cage at Revolution, where he was unsuccessful. On July 3 at Beach Break, Garcia faced Will Ospreay for the International Championship but lost after interference from MJF. A post-match attack by MJF wrote Garcia off television. He returned at All In in August, interfering in Ospreay’s match against MJF and costing MJF the title. The feud concluded at All Out, where Garcia was defeated but attacked MJF after the match.

Garcia returned on Dynamite in October and announced he had re-signed with AEW. The following month, he defeated Jack Perry at Full Gear to win the TNT Championship, his first title in AEW. He was later confirmed for the 2024 Continental Classic, finishing with seven points but failing to advance to the semifinals. During his 134-day reign as TNT Champion, Garcia made successful defenses against several opponents such as Mark Briscoe and Katsuyori Shibata, before losing the title to Adam Cole at Dynasty on April 6, 2025. After losing to Cole, Garcia entered a feud with FTR, who were now heels. On May 25 at Double or Nothing, Garcia teamed with Nigel McGuinness in a losing effort against FTR. On July 12 at All In, Garcia competed in a four-way match for the vacant TNT Championship, but failed to win.

==== Death Riders (2025–present) ====
On the September 10 episode of Dynamite, Garcia turned heel after attacking Darby Allin and joined the Death Riders. After joining the Death Riders, Garcia teamed with his stablemates in a Blood and Guts match on November 12 at the namesake event and in a Mixed Nuts Mayhem match on December 27 at Worlds End.

On August 21, 2026 at Death Before Dishonor, Garcia defeated Adam Priest in a Continental Challenge Cup play-in match to replace an injured Eddie Kingston in the tournament, but would lose to stabelmate Claudio Castagnoli the following night on Collision in the quarter-final. On September 12 at the A Tribute to "The Butcher" Andy Williamse special episode of Collision, Garcia won "The Butcher Battle Royal", earning the right to donate $100,000 to any charity of his choice in honor of fellow wrestler and Buffalo native "The Butcher" Andy Williams who had died a week prior. Garcia chose to donate the money to MusiCares. On the October 21 episode of Dynamite, the Death Riders all officially turned face after they and The Conglomeration were all attacked by The Dogs and the Bang Bang Gang, who turned heel. Garcia and the Death Riders teamed with the Conglomeration to face the Dogs and Bang Bang Gang – who had merged into a new faction, The Cut – at Full Gear on November 14 in an Anarchy in the Arena match, which they lost.

=== Pro Wrestling Guerrilla (2021–2023) ===
In 2021, Garcia debuted for Pro Wrestling Guerrilla (PWG), where he won the Battle of Los Angeles tournament in January 2022. He defeated Bandido in May to win the PWG World Championship, successfully defending the title against several challengers. As of August 2023, PWG has since gone on hiatus, leaving Garcia's status as PWG World Champion unknown.

=== Consejo Mundial de Lucha Libre (2025–present) ===
Garcia and his Death Riders stablemate Wheeler Yuta made their Consejo Mundial de Lucha Libre (CMLL) debut on the November 11, 2025 episode of Viernes Espectacular, unsuccessfully challenging Los Hermanos Chavez (Angel de Oro and Niebla Roja) for the CMLL World Tag Team Championship. At Homenaje a Dos Leyendas on March 20, 2026, Garcia, Yuta, and Jon Moxley unsuccessfully challenged El Sky Team (Místico, Máscara Dorada, and Neón) for the CMLL World Trios Championship.

== Professional wrestling style and persona ==
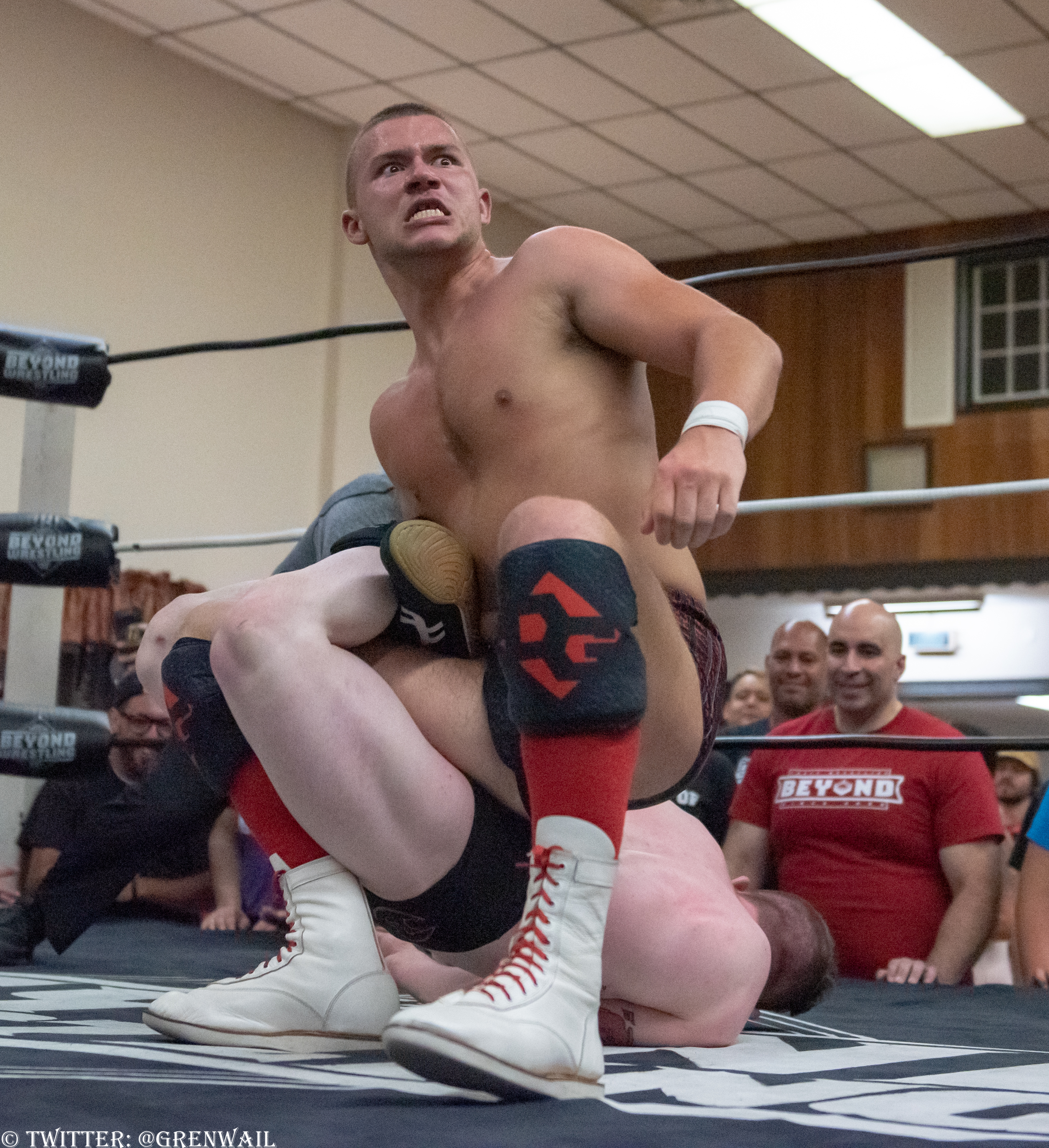
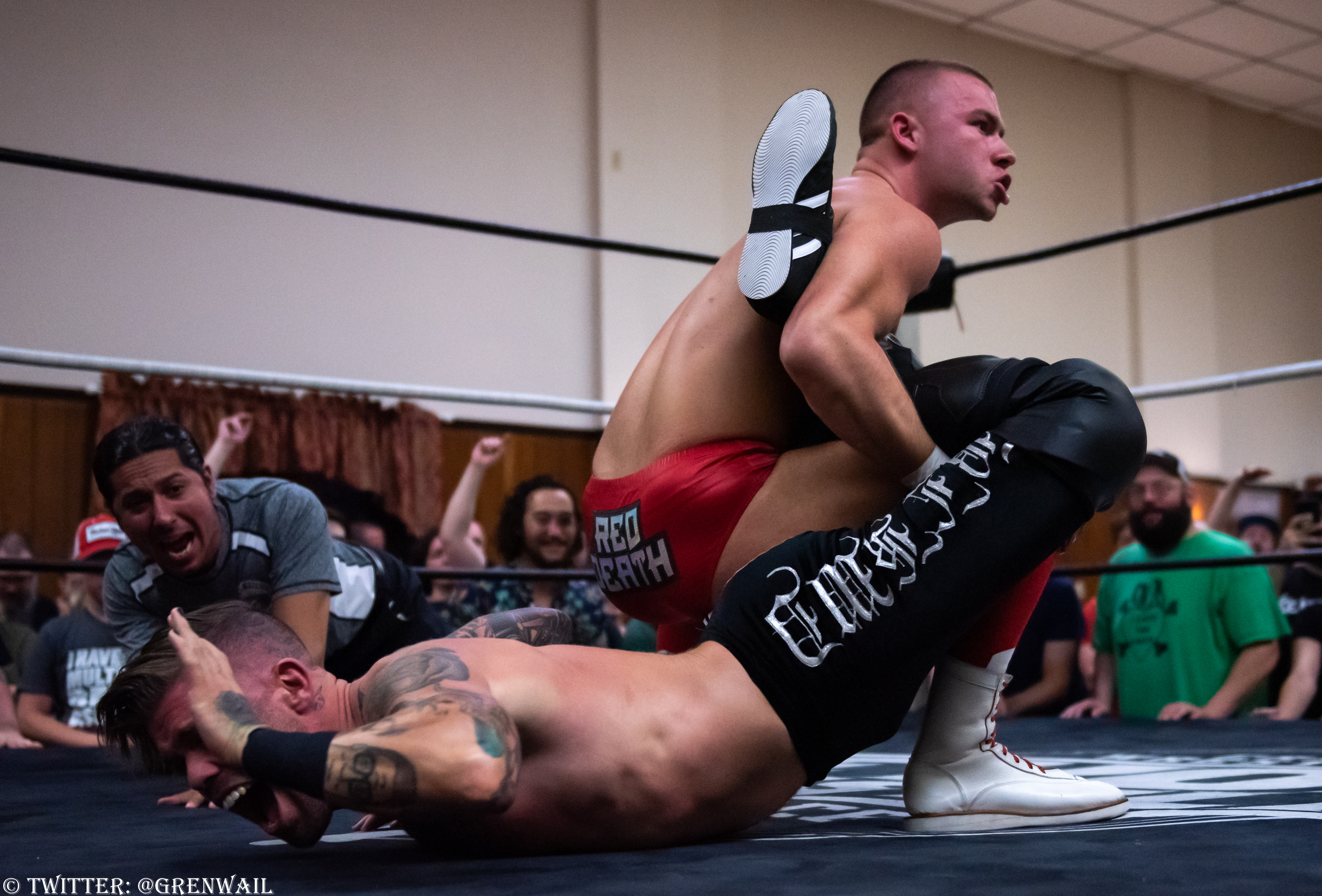
Garcia, seen here in 2019, applying a Sharpshooter hold, which he dubbed the Dragon Tamer in 2022.

Garcia has been described as a technical wrestler. He uses a bridging Sharpshooter hold as a finishing move, which since 2022 he calls the Dragon Tamer. This is a reference to his upset victory over "The American Dragon" Bryan Danielson by using the move at the Dynamite special Fight for the Fallen on July 27, 2022.

Following his entry into the JAS, Garcia rejected the label "professional wrestler" and embraced calling himself a sports entertainer, a pejorative term used in AEW to denote a wrestling storytelling style that prioritizes showmanship. On a Dynamite show held in El Paso, Texas, Garcia began to dance in a Latin-esque way to elicit reactions from the crowd; he has since incorporated this into his character, where he uses the dance as a taunt.

== Personal life ==
In January 2019, Garcia broke both of his legs in a car crash involving three other wrestlers. The vehicle he was riding in crashed after hitting black ice. Garcia returned to wrestling six months later. The following year, he graduated from Buffalo State College with a communications degree.

== Championships and accomplishments ==
- All Elite Wrestling
  - AEW TNT Championship (1 time)
  - The Butcher Battle Royale (2026)
- Capital City Championship Combat
  - C4 Championship (1 time)
  - Fighting Back Invitational Battle Royal (2019)
- Empire State Wrestling
  - ESW Heavyweight Championship (1 time)
- ESPN
  - Ranked No. 29 of the 30 best Pro Wrestlers Under 30 in 2023
- Limitless Wrestling
  - Limitless World Championship (1 time)
- Pro Wrestling Guerrilla
  - PWG World Championship (1 time,)
  - Battle of Los Angeles (2022)
- Pro Wrestling Illustrated
  - Ranked No. 69 of the top 500 singles wrestlers in the PWI 500 in 2023
- Ring of Honor
  - ROH Pure Championship (1 time)
