= AEW Unified Championship =

Men's professional wrestling championship

- The AEW Unified Championship belt without the outer side plates

Details
- Promotion: All Elite Wrestling
- Date established: June 11, 2025
Statistics
- First champion: Kazuchika Okada
- Longest reign: Kazuchika Okada (168 days)
- Shortest reign: Kazuchika Okada (168 days)

The AEW Unified Championship is a men's professional wrestling championship created and promoted by the American promotion All Elite Wrestling (AEW). It is the unification of the AEW Continental Championship and AEW International Championship, and is only active when a wrestler holds both titles, which maintain their individual title histories while the Unified title also has its own unique history. As of December 27, 2025, the Unified Championship is inactive.

When active, matches specifically for the Unified Championship are Winner Takes All matches as the Continental and International Championships are also on the line. Additionally, it is contested under the same rules as the Continental Championship, in which no one is allowed at ringside, outside interference is strictly prohibited, and matches have a 20-minute time limit.

The title was unveiled during Dynamite: Summer Blockbuster on June 11, 2025. The inaugural and only Unified Champion thus far was Kazuchika Okada, who was the reigning Continental Champion. He defeated reigning International Champion Kenny Omega in a Winner Takes All championship unification match at All In: Texas on July 12. His reign ended when he was forced to relinquish the Unified Championship after he lost the Continental Championship to Jon Moxley in the final of the 2025 Continental Classic at Worlds End on December 27.

== History ==
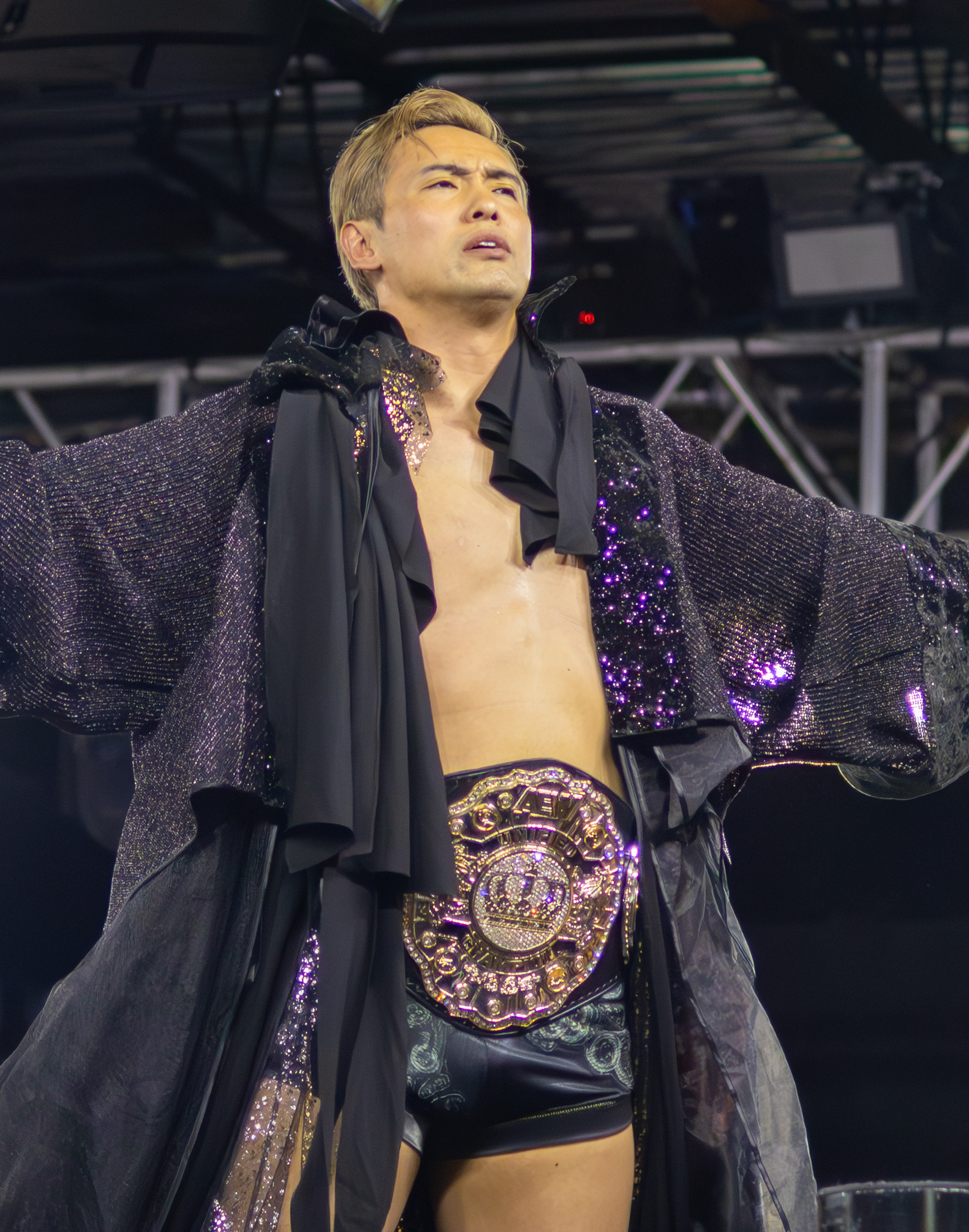
Inaugural and thus far only Unified Champion Kazuchika Okada

On the March 20, 2024, episode of the professional wrestling promotion All Elite Wrestling's (AEW) flagship television program, Dynamite, Kazuchika Okada defeated defending champion Eddie Kingston to win the AEW Continental Championship. The following year on March 9, 2025, at the Revolution pay-per-view (PPV) event, Kenny Omega defeated defending champion Konosuke Takeshita to win the AEW International Championship. At Dynamite: Fyter Fest on June 4, a match for both the Continental Championship and International Championship was scheduled for All In: Texas, reviving Okada and Omega's rivalry from 2017 and 2018 in New Japan Pro-Wrestling (NJPW). During their contract signing at Dynamite: Summer Blockbuster a week later, AEW senior producer Tony Schiavone announced that the match would unify the Continental and International titles as the AEW Unified Championship.

Fightful Select reported that the title would be booked as another top championship on par with the AEW World Championship and not as a "mid or upper-midcard level title". During the All In: Texas media call on July 8, Khan clarified that neither the Continental Championship nor International Championship would be retired, and that their lineages would still be intact. The Unified Championship would have its own lineage, and the champion can choose to carry all three titles. Khan stated that the Unified Championship was established because, "I wanted to create something special around this match and event."

At All In: Texas on July 12, Okada defeated Omega to become the inaugural Unified Champion. Since Continental Champion Okada won, AEW president Tony Khan announced that the Unified Championship would be contested under Continental Rules, the same rules for matches for the Continental Championship, in which no one is allowed at ringside, outside interference is strictly prohibited, and matches have a 20-minute time limit. At the 2025 Continental Classic, only the Continental Championship was at stake. Thus, if Okada lost, he would also have to vacate the Unified Championship. In the final of the Continental Classic at Worlds End on December 27, Okada lost to Jon Moxley, forcing him to relinquish the Unified Championship, rendering it inactive.

== Belt design ==
The AEW Unified Championship belt takes inspiration from both the Continental and International Championship belts. It has five gold plates on a black leather strap. The oval shaped center plate features AEW's logo at the top. At the center of the center plate is a circle that has the crown from the Continental Championship, with the rest of the circle filled in with jewels. Above and below this are two black banners, in similar style to the International Championship, which say "Unified" on the top banner and "Champion" on the lower banner. The banners are held up on each side by an upright lion facing inward, also from the International Championship. By the end of each banner are parts of a globe, similar to the circles on the four corners of the International Championship's center plate. The inner side plates also have an oval shape and are modeled after the Continental Championship's side plates, featuring part of the globe with the AEW logo above it, but these are customizable as the globe can be removed and replaced with the reigning champion's logos.

The outer side plates are unique in that the left one features Kenny Omega delivering his finisher, the One-Winged Angel, while the right one shows Kazuchika Okada performing his finisher, The Rainmaker. According to the Wrestling Observer, AEW president Tony Khan plans to keep the Omega and Okada side plates to commemorate the International and Continental titles and the legacies that Omega and Okada brought to the unification match. Like most of AEW's prior championships, the belt was produced by Red Leather Belts. This would be the last championship belt produced by Red Leather for AEW, as their partnership ended in August 2025.

== Reigns ==
As of November 7, 2026, the Unified Championship is inactive with only one champion. The inaugural and thus far only champion is Kazuchika Okada. The title was deactivated when Okada was forced to relinquish the title after losing the AEW Continental Championship to Jon Moxley in the final of the 2025 Continental Classic at Worlds End on December 27, 2025, in Hoffman Estates, Illinois.

Key
No.	Overall reign number
Reign	Reign number for the specific champion
Days	Number of days held
+	Current reign is changing daily

No.	Champion	Championship change			Reign statistics		Notes	Ref.
No.	Champion	Date	Event	Location	Reign	Days	Notes	Ref.
1	Kazuchika Okada	July 12, 2025	All In: Texas	Arlington, TX	1	168	Defeated AEW International Champion Kenny Omega in a Winner Takes All unification match, in which Okada defended his AEW Continental Championship, to become the inaugural Unified Champion. The respective titles maintained their individual lineages.	
—	Deactivated	December 27, 2025	Worlds End	Hoffman Estates, IL	—	—	The title was vacated after previous champion Kazuchika Okada lost the AEW Continental Championship to Jon Moxley in the final of the 2025 Continental Classic, rendering the Unified Championship inactive.	
