= AEW Revolution (2026) =

All Elite Wrestling pay-per-view event

Revolution
- Promotional poster featuring MJF and "Hangman" Adam Page
- Promotion: All Elite Wrestling
- Date: March 15, 2026
- City: Los Angeles, California
- Venue: Crypto.com Arena
- Attendance: 12,590
- Buy rate: 178,000

Pay-per-view chronology
← Previous; Worlds End	Next → Dynasty

Revolution chronology
← Previous; 2025	Next → —

The 2026 Revolution was a professional wrestling pay-per-view (PPV) event produced by All Elite Wrestling (AEW). It was the seventh annual Revolution and took place on March 15, 2026, at Crypto.com Arena in Los Angeles, California, marking the second consecutive year that Revolution was hosted at the venue. Internationally, this was the company's first PPV to livestream on MyAEW.

Thirteen matches were contested at the event, including three on the "Zero Hour" pre-show. In the main event, MJF defeated "Hangman" Adam Page by technical knockout in a Last Chance Texas Deathmatch to retain the AEW World Championship. In other prominent matches, Jon Moxley defeated Konosuke Takeshita by technical submission in a no time limit match to retain the AEW Continental Championship, Thekla defeated Kris Statlander in a two out of three falls match to retain the AEW Women's World Championship, and in the opening bout, FTR (Cash Wheeler and Dax Harwood) defeated The Young Bucks (Matt Jackson and Nick Jackson) to retain the AEW World Tag Team Championship. The event also featured the returns of Adam Copeland, Christian Cage, Will Ospreay, and Kenny Omega, and an appearance by Ronda Rousey.

Revolution received positive reviews, with particularly high marks given to the Continental Championship match, the Andrade/Bandido bout, and the Texas Death Match main event. Additionally, the opening Tag Team Championship Match between FTR and The Young Bucks received widespread acclaim from critics for their performances.

== Production ==
=== Background ===
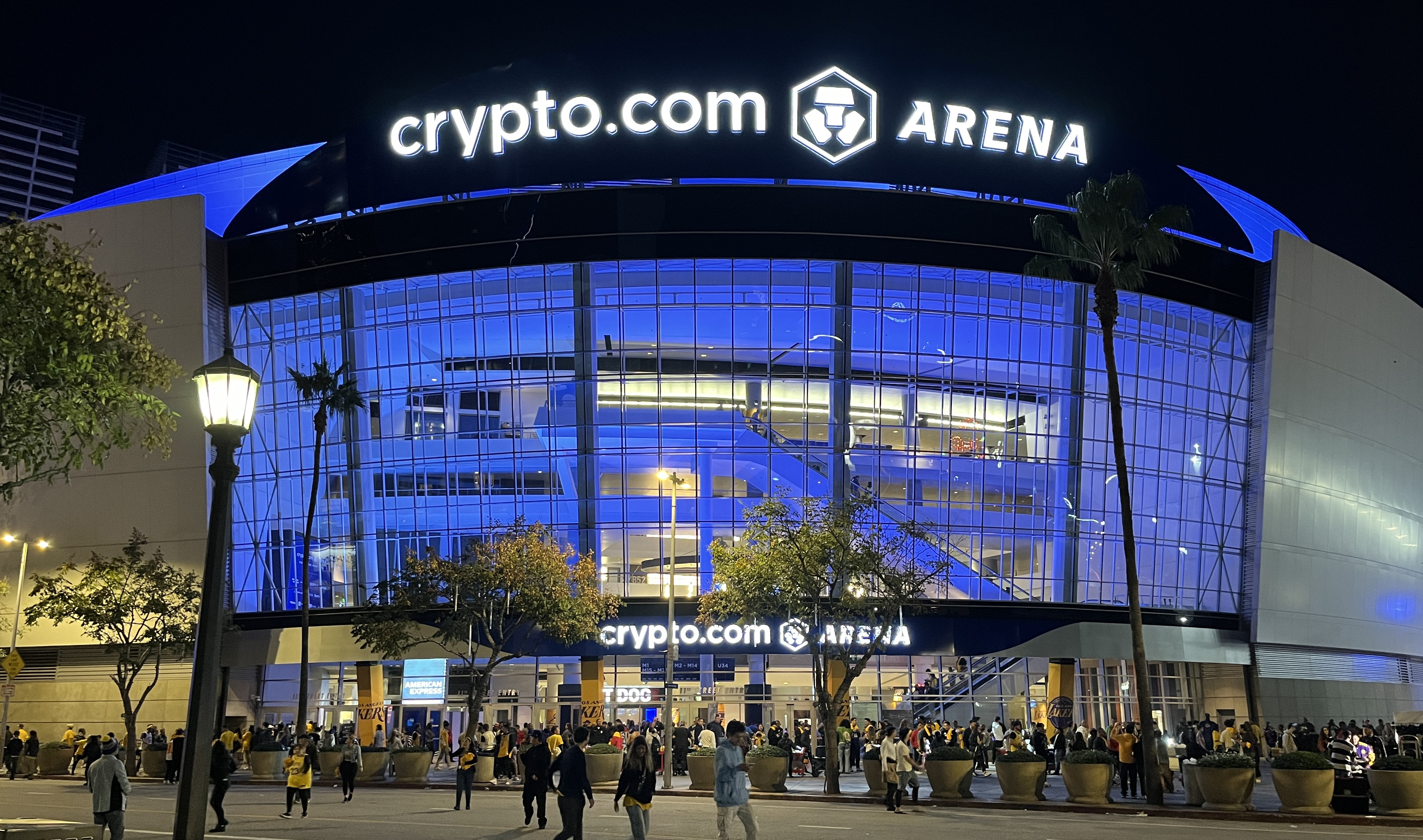
For a second consecutive year, Revolution was held at Crypto.com Arena in Los Angeles, California.

Revolution is a professional wrestling pay-per-view (PPV) event held annually by All Elite Wrestling (AEW) since 2020—it was originally held in late February but moved to early March in 2021. It is one of AEW's "Big Five" PPVs, which also includes Double or Nothing, All In, All Out, and Full Gear, their five biggest shows produced throughout the year.

On December 1, 2025, AEW announced that the seventh annual Revolution would take place at Crypto.com Arena in Los Angeles, California on March 15, 2026, marking the second consecutive year for the venue to host Revolution. This was also the latest scheduled Revolution, taking place in mid-March instead of early March. Tickets went on sale on December 15.

=== Broadcast ===
Revolution aired via PPV through traditional cable and satellite providers. In the United States, AEW PPV events are available on HBO Max at an exclusive discounted rate for subscribers. The event was also available in the United States and internationally on DAZN, Prime Video, Triller TV, PPV.com, and YouTube. Additionally in the United States, the show was broadcast at Dave & Buster's and Tom's Watch Bar locations. Outside of the United States and Canada, the event was available to stream on MyAEW, the company's new streaming service that launched internationally on March 9, 2026.

=== Storylines ===
Other on-screen personnel
Role	Name
Commentators	Excalibur (Pre-show and PPV)
Commentators	Tony Schiavone (Pre-show and PPV)
Commentators	Nigel McGuinness (Pre-show and PPV)
Commentators	Bryan Danielson (PPV)
Commentators	Don Callis (Andrade vs. Bandido)
Spanish Commentators	Carlos Cabrera
Spanish Commentators	Alvaro Riojas
Spanish Commentators	Ariel Levy
Ring announcers	Arkady Aura
Ring announcers	Justin Roberts
Referees	Aubrey Edwards
Referees	Bryce Remsburg
Referees	Mike Posey
Referees	Paul Turner
Referees	Rick Knox
Referees	Stephon Smith
Pre-show hosts	Renee Paquette
Pre-show hosts	RJ City
Pre-show hosts	Jeff Jarrett

Revolution featured 13 professional wrestling matches that involved different wrestlers from pre-existing feuds and storylines. Storylines were produced on AEW's weekly television programs, Dynamite and Collision.

At Full Gear in November 2025, "Hangman" Adam Page lost the AEW World Championship. He then failed to regain the title the following month at Worlds End in a four-way match that also involved MJF, who won the championship. Page then won a match at Grand Slam Australia in February 2026 to earn another title match at Revolution. After that, Page challenged MJF to a Texas Deathmatch for the title, but after MJF refused, Page offered that he would never challenge for the title again if he lost, and MJF accepted. A coin flip occurred the following week to decide the stipulation where tails meant that the match would be a Texas Deathmatch but heads would be that MJF could not be disqualified. After MJF flipped the coin and it landed on heads, Page noticed that the coin was double-sided, and consequently, AEW President Tony Khan officially sanctioned Page's last chance as a Texas Deathmatch.

During the league matches of the 2025 Continental Classic, Konosuke Takeshita defeated Jon Moxley with this being the only non-Death Rider to defeat Moxley during the tournament. Moxley, however, ultimately won the tournament and the AEW Continental Championship at Worlds End. He faced Takeshita again at Grand Slam Australia in a match that ended in a 20-minute time limit draw. Frustrated that he did not defeat Takeshita in the time limit, Moxley issued a challenge for a rematch at Revolution with no time limit, which Takeshita accepted, marking the first time that the title would be defended without its time limit rule.

On the February 11 episode of Dynamite, The Young Bucks (Matt Jackson and Nick Jackson) won a three-way tag team match to earn a title match against FTR (Cash Wheeler and Dax Harwood) for the AEW World Tag Team Championship at Revolution. Things got personal after FTR assaulted The Young Bucks's family, including their younger brother, Malachi, on the February 21 episode of Collision.

== Aftermath ==
During the post-event media scrum, Tony Khan was questioned on if "Hangman" Adam Page could ever challenge for the AEW World Championship again. Khan said that the last chance stipulation was a gentleman's handshake agreement between Page and MJF and claimed that Page "is somebody that's known for being a man of his word".

== Results ==
No.	Results	Stipulations	Times
1^{P}	Boom & Doom ("Big Boom!" A.J. and Q. T. Marshall) (with Aaron Solo, Big Justice, and The Rizzler) defeated The Infantry (Capt. Shawn Dean and Carlie Bravo) (with Christyan XO, Shane Taylor, and Trish Adora) by pinfall	Tag team match	7:40
2^{P}	Willow Nightingale (c) defeated Lena Kross by pinfall	Singles match for the AEW TBS Championship	11:00
3^{P}	Jack Perry won by last eliminating Ricochet (c) (Note: Order of elimination: Rocky Romero, Austin Gunn, AR Fox, Johnny TV, Scorpio Sky, Lio Rush, Dralístico, Anthony Bowens, Dalton Castle, The Beast Mortos, Trent Beretta, Komander, Daniel Garcia, Katsuyori Shibata, Rush, Ace Austin, Tommaso Ciampa, Juice Robinson, El Clon, and Ricochet.)	21-man Blackjack Battle Royal for the AEW National Championship	21:55
4	FTR (Dax Harwood and Cash Wheeler) (c) (with Stokely) defeated The Young Bucks (Nick Jackson and Matt Jackson) by pinfall	Tag team match for the AEW World Tag Team Championship	18:50
5	"Timeless" Toni Storm defeated Marina Shafir by pinfall	Singles match Everyone was banned from ringside.	9:50
6	Jon Moxley (c) defeated Konosuke Takeshita by technical submission	No time limit match for the AEW Continental Championship	23:25
7	Divine Dominion (Megan Bayne and Lena Kross) defeated The Babes of Wrath (Harley Cameron and Willow Nightingale) (c) by pinfall	Tag team match for the AEW Women's World Tag Team Championship	5:00
8	Swerve Strickland (with Prince Nana) defeated Brody King by pinfall	Singles match	14:50
9	Thekla (c) defeated Kris Statlander 2–1	Two out of three falls match for the AEW Women's World Championship	17:30
10	Místico and JetSpeed (Kevin Knight and "Speedball" Mike Bailey) defeated The Don Callis Family (Kazuchika Okada, Kyle Fletcher, and Mark Davis) (c) by pinfall	Trios match for the AEW World Trios Championship	17:10
11	Andrade El Ídolo (with Don Callis) defeated Bandido by pinfall	Singles match	21:00
12	Darby Allin, Orange Cassidy, and Roderick Strong defeated The Dogs (David Finlay, Gabe Kidd, and Clark Connors) by pinfall	Tornado trios match	12:25
13	MJF (c) defeated "Hangman" Adam Page	Last Chance Texas Deathmatch for the AEW World Championship; Since Page lost, he agreed that he can never challenge for the AEW World Championship again.	46:20
(c) / – the champion(s) heading into the match; P / – the match was broadcast on the pre-show
