= AEW International Championship =

Men's professional wrestling championship

- The AEW International Championship belt (2023–present)

Details
- Promotion: All Elite Wrestling
- Date established: June 8, 2022
- Current champion: Kazuchika Okada
- Date won: August 30, 2026

Other names
- AEW All-Atlantic Championship (2022–2023); AEW International Championship (Note: During MJF's reign from July to August 2024, he unofficially rebranded the title as the AEW American Championship) (2023–present)
Statistics
- First champion: Pac
- Most reigns: 2 reigns: Orange Cassidy; Will Ospreay; Konosuke Takeshita; Kazuchika Okada
- Longest reign: Orange Cassidy (1st reign, 326 days)
- Shortest reign: Jon Moxley (17 days)
- Oldest champion: Kenny Omega (41 years, 144 days)
- Youngest champion: Kyle Fletcher (27 years, 196 days)
- Heaviest champion: Konosuke Takeshita (251 lb (114 kg))
- Lightest champion: Orange Cassidy (161 lb (73 kg))

The AEW International Championship is a professional wrestling championship created and promoted by the American promotion All Elite Wrestling (AEW). It is a secondary championship for male wrestlers, and unlike AEW's other titles, which are almost exclusively defended on AEW programming, the International Championship can also be defended in other promotions globally. The current champion is Kazuchika Okada, who is in his record-tying second reign. He won the title by defeating previous champion Kyle Fletcher and Konosuke Takeshita in a three-way match at All In on August 30, 2026.

Established as the AEW All-Atlantic Championship on June 8, 2022, the title was created to represent AEW's fans from around the world with no particular focus on the Atlantic Ocean or countries surrounding it. The inaugural champion was Pac. Since its inception, it has been defended in Britain's Revolution Pro Wrestling, Ireland's Over the Top Wrestling, Japan's New Japan Pro-Wrestling, Mexico's Consejo Mundial de Lucha Libre, and Canada's Maple Leaf Pro Wrestling. On March 15, 2023, the title was rebranded as the AEW International Championship, while during MJF's reign from July to August 2024, he unofficially rebranded the title as the AEW American Championship. When the title is jointly held with the AEW Continental Championship, both titles together make up the AEW Unified Championship; as of October 2026, this has only happened once.

== History ==
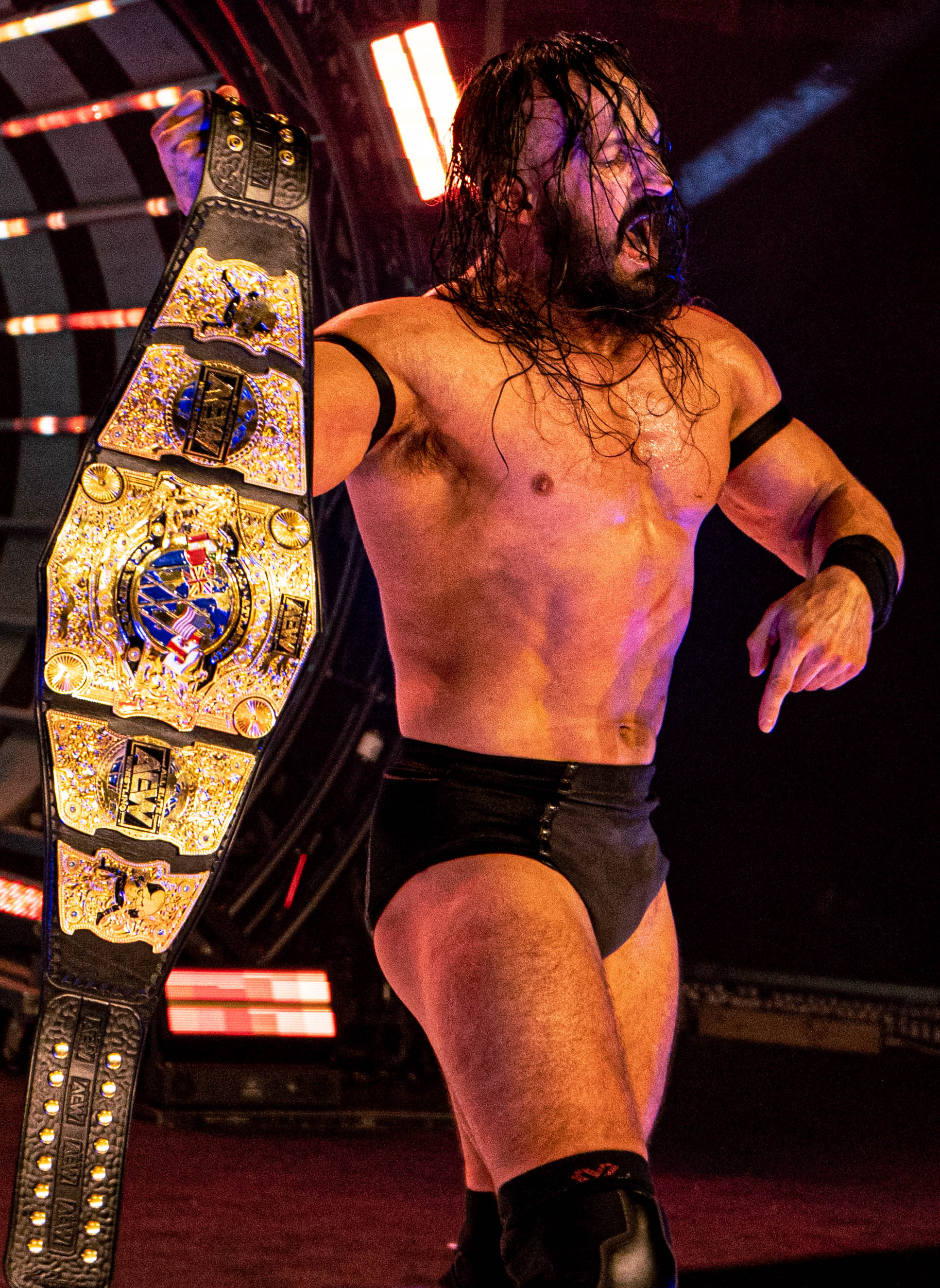
Inaugural champion Pac, who won the title as the AEW All-Atlantic Championship

The professional wrestling championship was unveiled by the American promotion All Elite Wrestling (AEW) on its television program Dynamite on June 8, 2022. It was originally established as the AEW All-Atlantic Championship and was created to be a secondary title for the men's division. Despite its original name seemingly centering on countries around the Atlantic Ocean, the company said that the championship represented AEW's fans from around the world.

The inaugural champion was crowned in a four-way match which was held at the Forbidden Door pay-per-view event on June 26, which was co-produced with the Japanese promotion New Japan Pro-Wrestling (NJPW). To determine the competitors in the four-way, six qualifying matches were held. Three of these featured wrestlers from AEW with the three winners advancing to the four-way match. The other three qualifying matches were held between four wrestlers from NJPW in a single-elimination tournament fashion. The winners of NJPW's preliminary qualifiers faced off and the winner of that match advanced to the four-way at Forbidden Door. On the AEW side, Pac, Miro, and Malakai Black won their qualifiers; on the NJPW side, Tomohiro Ishii qualified but suffered a legitimate left knee injury and had to be replaced with the runner-up, Clark Connors. At Forbidden Door, Pac became the inaugural champion by submitting Connors.

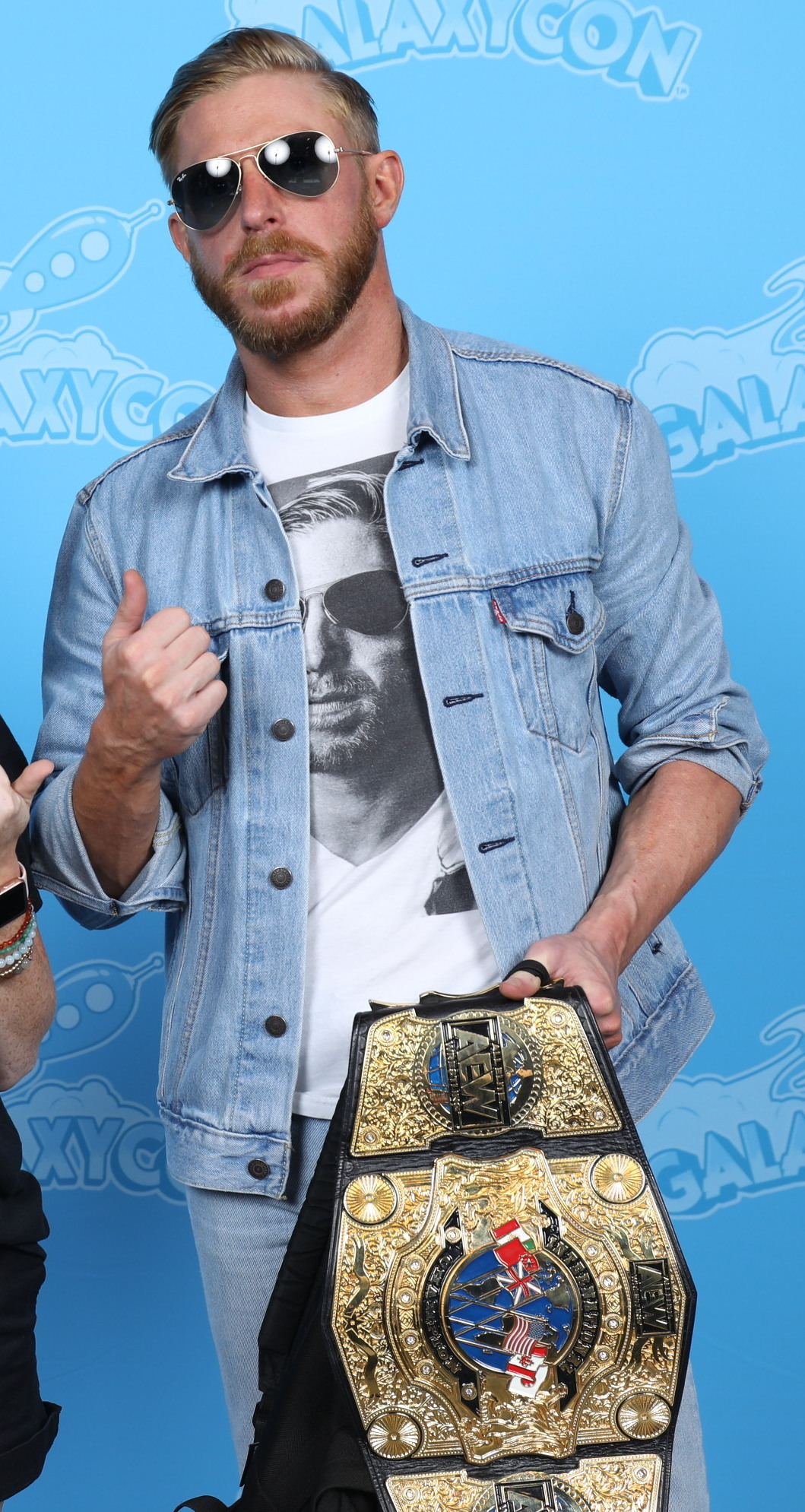
Record-tying two-time champion Orange Cassidy; his first reign is also the longest reign at 326 days and he has the longest combined reign at 471 days. Cassidy originally won the title as the All-Atlantic Championship and it was renamed to International Championship during his first reign in March 2023.

In an interview with Robbie Fox on the My Mom's Basement podcast, AEW president Tony Khan confirmed that the championship would be defended differently than the company's other titles. Khan said that holders of the championship would defend the title internationally in other promotions, in addition to AEW. This interview came shortly after Pac defended the title at an event for Britain's Revolution Pro Wrestling (RevPro), which was later shown on AEW's YouTube show, Dark, on July 12. Pac also defended the title at an event for Ireland's Over the Top Wrestling (OTT) on July 22. Since then, the title has been defended in NJPW, Mexico's Consejo Mundial de Lucha Libre (CMLL), and Canada's Maple Leaf Pro Wrestling (MLP).

On the March 8, 2023, episode of Dynamite, Tony Khan announced that Orange Cassidy's defense of the title that night was the final as the AEW All-Atlantic Championship. The following week on March 15, in celebration of the release of the Warner Bros. film Shazam! Fury of the Gods, the title was rebranded as the AEW International Championship due to AEW's broadcast partnership with Warner Bros. Discovery. At the time, AEW had considered this to be a new title, with Cassidy regarded as the final All-Atlantic Champion and inaugural International Champion, but the title history was later amended to show that it was the same championship with Cassidy's reign as one continuous reign from when he originally defeated Pac for the title.

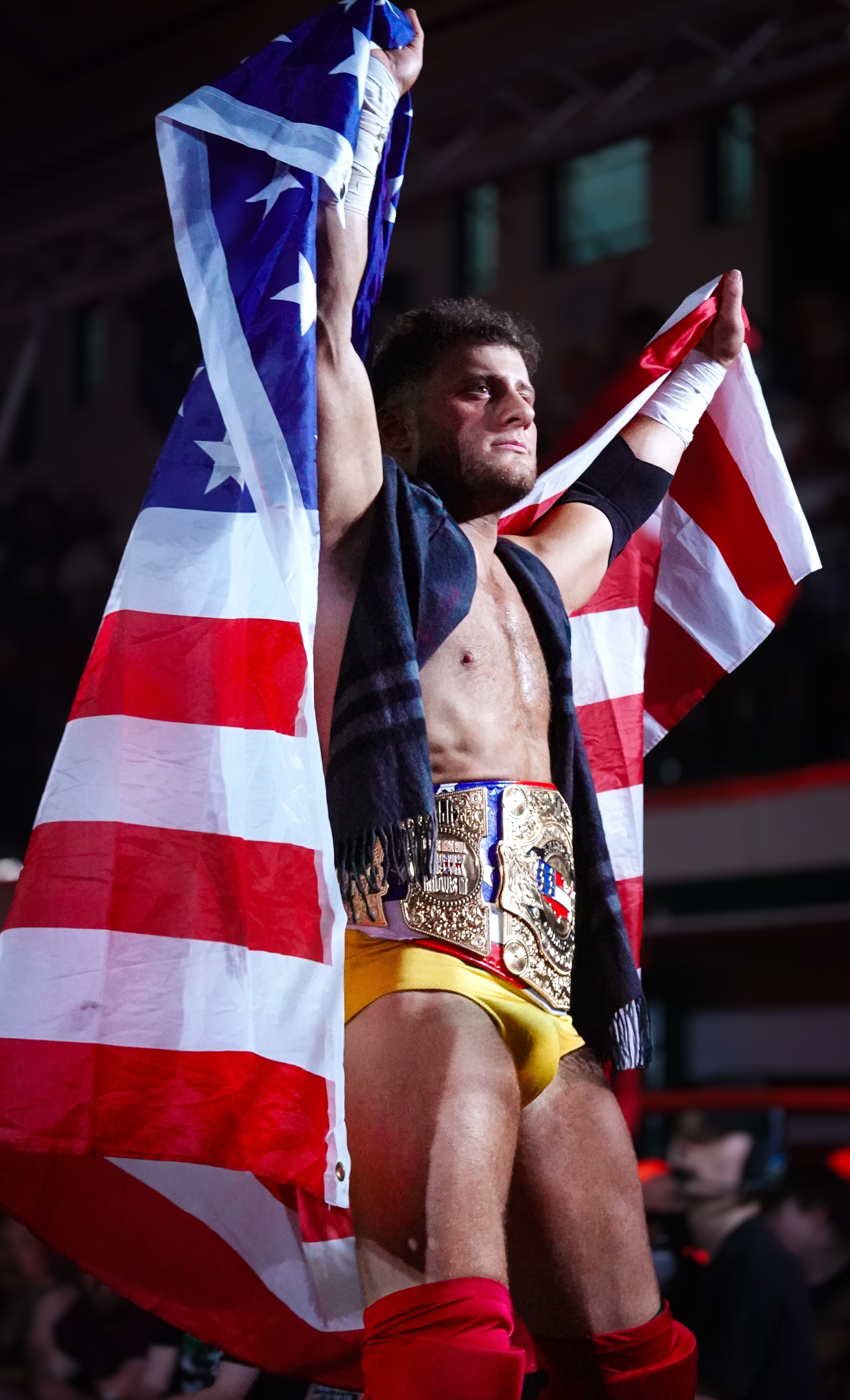
One-time champion MJF with his custom "American Championship" belt.

During Dynamite: Blood & Guts on July 24, 2024, reigning champion MJF, who won the title from Will Ospreay at the previous week's Dynamite 250, unofficially rebranded the title as the "AEW American Championship". He also introduced his own custom version of the title belt to reflect this unofficial name change. After Ospreay regained the title at All In London the following month on August 25, the title was restored as the International Championship.

At Revolution on March 9, 2025, Kenny Omega dethroned Konosuke Takeshita to win the International Championship. After successfully defending the title at Dynamite: Fyter Fest on June 4, 2025, Omega was confronted by AEW Continental Champion Kazuchika Okada, setting up a Winner Takes All match for All In on July 12. A week later during the contract signing at Dynamite: Summer Blockbuster, Tony Schiavone announced that the winner would also unify the International and Continental titles as the AEW Unified Championship. During the All In: Texas media call just a few days prior to the event on July 8, Tony Khan clarified that neither the Continental or International Championships would be retired and that their lineages would still be intact along with a new lineage for the Unified Championship, and the champion had the option to carry around all three belts. At All In, Okada defeated Omega to become the Unified Champion. Okada defended the three belts as one between All In and the 2025 Continental Classic. The tournament itself was only for the Continental Championship, meaning if Okada lost, he would also have to vacate the Unified Championship. In the final of the Continental Classic at Worlds End on December 27, 2025, Okada lost to Jon Moxley, thus ending the unification and forcing Okada to relinquish the Unified Championship.

=== Inaugural championship tournament ===
Preliminary Qualifiers; New Japan Road (June 20, 2022)
(Japan) Tomoaki Honma	11:29
(United States) Clark Connors	Pin
(Japan) Tomohiro Ishii	Pin
(Japan) Yoshinobu Kanemaru	19:01

Qualifiers; Dynamite (June 8, 15, and 22, 2022); New Japan Road (June 21, 2022)
(Australia) Buddy Matthews	10:32
(United Kingdom) Pac	Pin
(Canada) Ethan Page	9:25
(Bulgaria) Miro	Sub
(Mexico) Penta Oscuro	9:49
(Netherlands) Malakai Black	Pin
(United States) Clark Connors	13:21
(Japan) Tomohiro Ishii	Pin

Final; Forbidden Door (June 26, 2022)
(United Kingdom) Pac	Sub
(Bulgaria) Miro	—
(Netherlands) Malakai Black	—
(United States) Clark Connors (Note: Connors replaced Ishii who was not medically cleared.)	15:05

== Belt design ==
Ron Edwardsen of Red Leather Belts designed the standard version of the championship belt. At the top of the center plate is AEW's logo, while at the center of the plate is a globe with flags representing six countries: Mexico, China, the United Kingdom (UK), the United States, Canada, and Japan. Originally, the banner above the globe read "All-Atlantic", but this was changed to "International" with the championship's rebranding on March 15, 2023. Another banner below the globe reads "Champion". On each opposing side of the globe are lions standing upright facing inwards. Sitting on each side of the center plate are two side plates. The inner side plates include AEW's logo over a globe, while the outer side plates feature two wrestlers grappling. Filigree fills in the rest of each plate.

=== Custom design ===
The custom AEW American Championship belt used by MJF during his reign from July to August 2024.

During Dynamite: Blood & Guts on July 24, 2024, reigning champion MJF threw away the standard version of the championship belt. He then introduced his own custom version, which he unofficially rebranded as the AEW American Championship. It featured the overall same design as the standard version, but the strap was painted like the American flag, the globe at the center was replaced by the contiguous United States, also painted like the American flag, and the upper banner read "American" instead of "International". Additionally, the two inner side plates mocked the UK, as well as UK native Will Ospreay, who MJF beat to win the title, as one side plate said "Better Than Will and the UK Knows It", a play on MJF's catchphrase of "better than you and you know it", and the other side plate said "Only Country That Matters", with the text for each written in red, white, and blue except the UK text, which was adorned as the UK flag. The grappling wrestlers on the outer side plates were also replaced by MJF himself posing, showing him kneeling on one knee and flexing his bicep. MJF's logo also replaced AEW's logo at the top of the center plate and was also placed at the top of the inner side plates. This custom belt was also designed by Ron Edwardsen. After MJF lost the title back to Ospreay at All In on August 25, the title was restored as the International Championship.

== Reigns ==
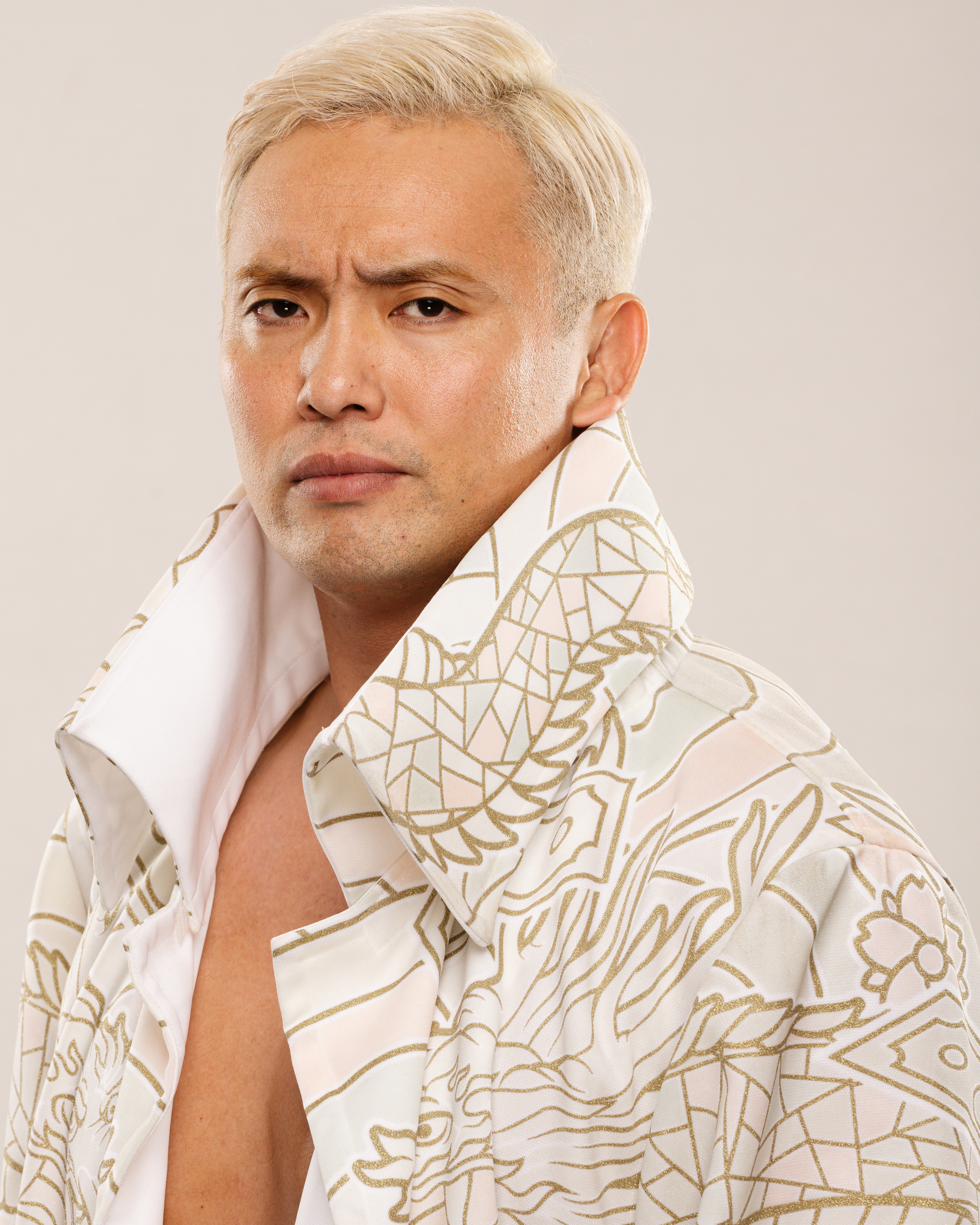
Current and record-tying two-time champion Kazuchika Okada

As of November 20, 2026, there have been 15 reigns between 11 champions. Pac was the inaugural champion. Orange Cassidy, Will Ospreay, Konosuke Takeshita, and Kazuchika Okada are tied for the most reigns at two, with Cassidy's first reign being the longest reign at 326 days, and he has the longest combined reign at 471 days. Jon Moxley has the shortest reign at 17 days. Kyle Fletcher is the youngest champion, winning the title at 27, while Kenny Omega is the oldest, winning the title at 41.

The reigning champion is Kazuchika Okada, who is in his first record-tying second reign. He won the title by defeating previous champion Kyle Fletcher and Konosuke Takeshita in a three-way match at All In on August 30, 2026, in London, England.
