= AEW Continental Championship =

Men's professional wrestling championship

- The AEW Continental Championship belt

Details
- Promotion: All Elite Wrestling
- Date established: November 18, 2023
- Current champion: Jon Moxley
- Date won: December 27, 2025
Statistics
- First champion: Eddie Kingston
- Longest reign: Kazuchika Okada (647 days)
- Shortest reign: Eddie Kingston (81 days)
- Oldest champion: Eddie Kingston (42 years, 18 days)
- Youngest champion: Kazuchika Okada (36 years, 133 days)
- Heaviest champion: Eddie Kingston (240 lb (110 kg))
- Lightest champion: Jon Moxley (231 lb (105 kg))

The AEW Continental Championship is a men's professional wrestling championship created and promoted by the American promotion All Elite Wrestling (AEW). Established on November 18, 2023, the title has a special attribute in that it is defended under Continental Rules—no one is allowed at ringside, outside interference is strictly prohibited, and matches have a 20-minute time limit. The reigning champion is Jon Moxley, who is in his first reign. He won the title by defeating Kazuchika Okada in the 2025 Continental Classic final at Worlds End on December 27, 2025; this also ended the title's unification with the AEW International Championship, rendering the AEW Unified Championship inactive.

The title is also the prize of the promotion's Continental Classic (C2), an annual round-robin tournament that begins at the end of November and culminates at the Worlds End pay-per-view event in late December. The incumbent champion at the time of the tournament is automatically entered and defends the title in the C2. Eddie Kingston became the first-ever Continental Champion after winning the inaugural tournament in December 2023.

When the title is jointly held with the ROH World Championship of sister American promotion Ring of Honor (ROH) and the Strong Openweight Championship of the American branch of partner promotion New Japan Pro-Wrestling, the three titles together make up the American Triple Crown Championship, also referred to as the Continental Crown. When the title is jointly held with the AEW International Championship, both titles together make up the AEW Unified Championship. As of December 2025, each unified championship has only happened once.

== History ==
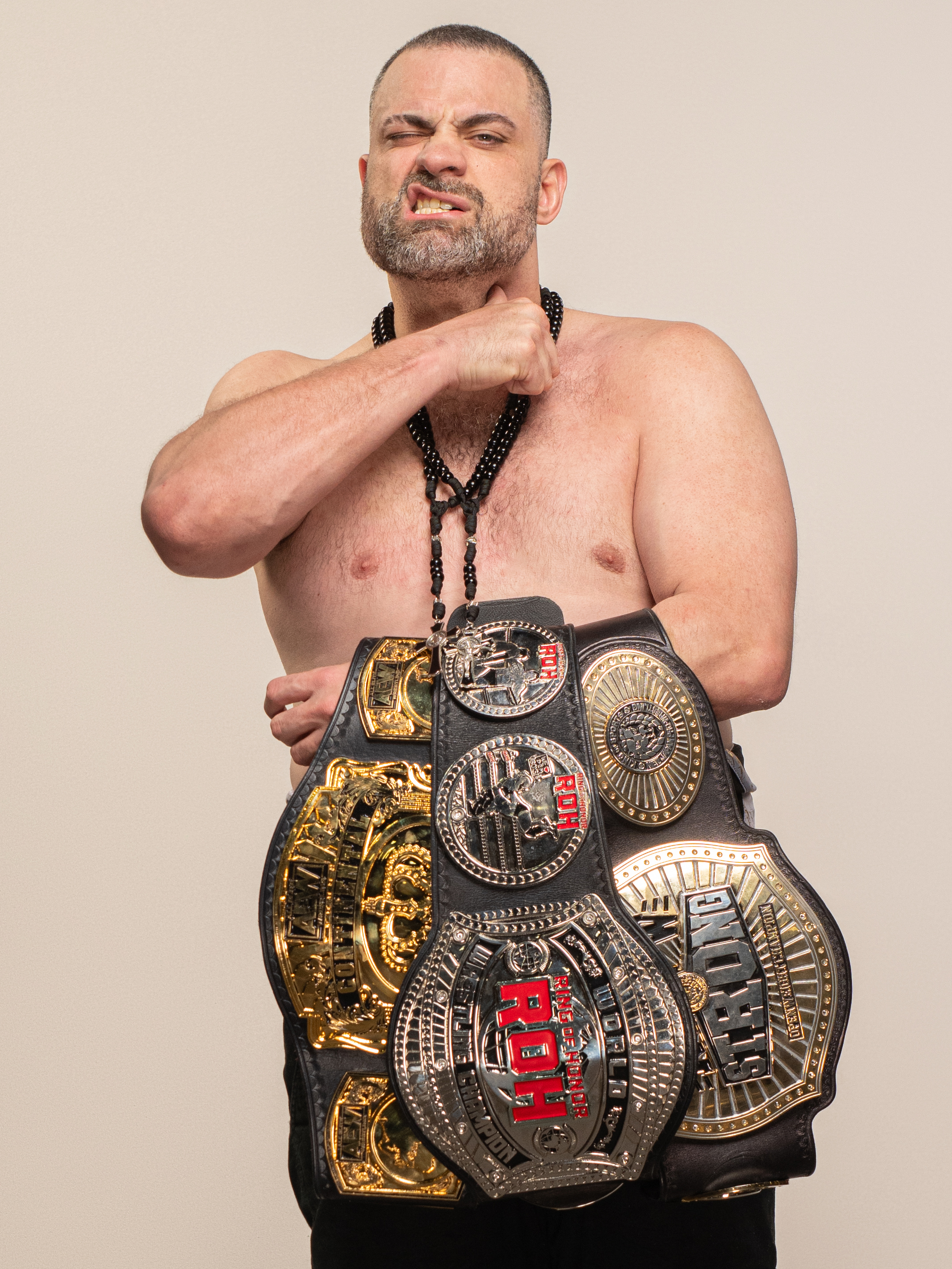
Inaugural champion Eddie Kingston as the Continental Crown Champion (AEW Continental Championship, ROH World Championship, and NJPW Strong Openweight Championship)

On November 11, 2023, the American professional wrestling promotion All Elite Wrestling (AEW) announced a tournament called the Continental Classic (C2). AEW president Tony Khan and AEW wrestler Bryan Danielson announced that the 2023 tournament would begin on the November 22 episode of Dynamite, lasting six weeks and held across episodes of Dynamite, Rampage, and Collision, and then concluding at the Worlds End pay-per-view (PPV) event on December 30. It was also announced that the winner of the tournament would become the inaugural holder of the AEW Continental Championship.

Eddie Kingston became the inaugural Continental Champion by defeating Jon Moxley in the final of the C2 at Worlds End. Kingston was also declared the American Triple Crown Champion (also referred to as the Continental Crown) upon winning the Continental Championship, as he simultaneously held the ROH World Championship of sister American promotion Ring of Honor (ROH) and the Strong Openweight Championship of the American branch of partner promotion New Japan Pro-Wrestling (NJPW). By being part of the Triple Crown Championship, the Continental Championship was recognized by AEW, ROH, and NJPW, allowing it to be defended in all three promotions.

On the March 20, 2024, episode of Dynamite, the championship was defended for the first time by itself, where Kazuchika Okada defeated Kingston to win the title. This in turn separated the Continental Championship from the Triple Crown. Tony Khan then clarified the rules of the championship. Title matches are held under Continental Rules, which are the same rules of the C2 in which no one is allowed at ringside, outside interference is strictly prohibited, and matches have a 20-minute time limit. He also re-clarified that whoever is champion coming out of November's Full Gear PPV, they would automatically be entered into the C2 and would defend the title in the tournament.

At Dynamite: Fyter Fest on June 4, 2025, reigning champion Okada confronted AEW International Champion Kenny Omega to set up a Winner Takes All match for All In on July 12. A week later during the contract signing at Dynamite: Summer Blockbuster, Tony Schiavone announced that the winner would also unify the International and Continental titles as the AEW Unified Championship. During the All In: Texas media call just a few days prior to the event on July 8, Tony Khan clarified that neither the Continental or International Championships would be retired and that their lineages would still be intact along with a new lineage for the Unified Championship, and the champion had the option to carry around all three belts. At All In, Okada defeated Omega to become the Unified Champion. Okada defended the three belts as one between All In and the 2025 Continental Classic. The tournament itself was only for the Continental Championship, meaning if Okada lost, he would also have to vacate the Unified Championship. In the final of the Continental Classic at Worlds End on December 27, 2025, Okada lost to Jon Moxley, thus ending the unification and forcing Okada to relinquish the Unified Championship.

At Revolution on March 15, 2026, the title was contested for the first time without its time limit rule. During Grand Slam Australia the prior month, reigning champion Jon Moxley defended the title against Konosuke Takeshita, but the match ended in a time limit draw. Frustrated that he could not defeat Takeshita within the time limit, Moxley challenged Takeshita to a rematch but with no time limit to ensure there was a decisive winner. Takeshita accepted and the match was scheduled for Revolution. In a match that went over 23 minutes, Moxley retained.

== Reigns ==
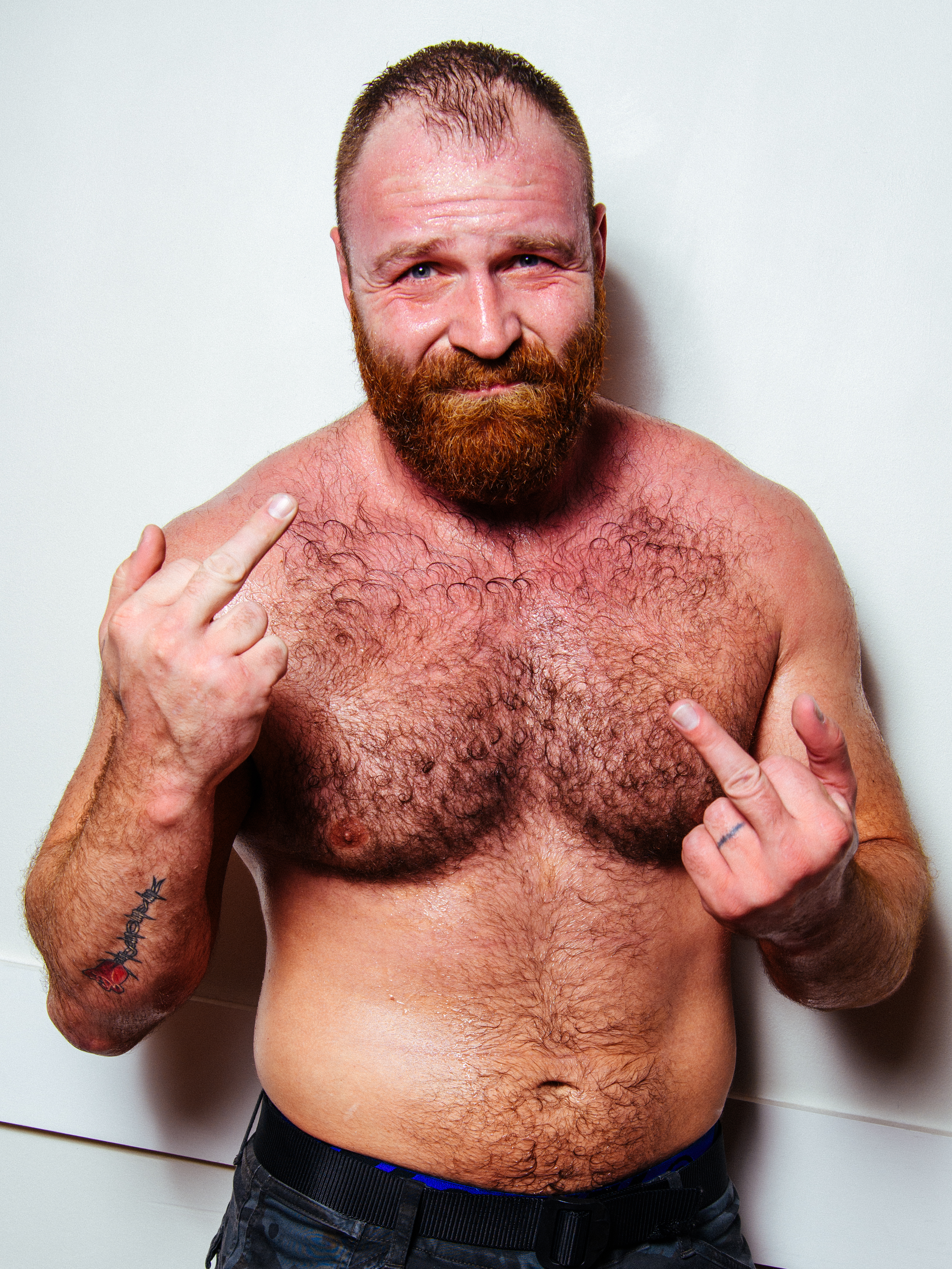
Current champion Jon Moxley

As of November 21, 2026, there have been three reigns. Eddie Kingston was the inaugural champion, which was the shortest reign at 81 days. Kazuchika Okada has the longest reign at 647 days, which is also the longest reign of any AEW championship, surpassing the record held by Jade Cargill at the time with her 508-day reign with the AEW TBS Championship. Kingston is also the oldest champion at 42 years old, while Okada is the youngest at 36.

The current champion is Jon Moxley, who is in his first reign. He won the title by defeating Kazuchika Okada in the final of the 2025 Continental Classic at Worlds End on December 27, 2025. This also ended the title's unification with the AEW International Championship, rendering the AEW Unified Championship inactive.

Key
No.	Overall reign number
Reign	Reign number for the specific champion
Days	Number of days held
+	Current reign is changing daily

No.	Champion	Championship change			Reign statistics		Notes	Ref.
No.	Champion	Date	Event	Location	Reign	Days	Notes	Ref.
1	Eddie Kingston	December 30, 2023	Worlds End	Uniondale, NY	1	81	Defeated Jon Moxley in the final of the 2023 Continental Classic to become the inaugural champion; Kingston's ROH World Championship and NJPW Strong Openweight Championship were also on the line, and he was dubbed the inaugural American Triple Crown Champion (also referred to as the Continental Crown) for holding all three titles.	
2	Kazuchika Okada	March 20, 2024	Dynamite	Toronto, ON, Canada	1	647	This match was only for the Continental Championship, thus separating it from the Continental Crown. During this reign at All In on July 12, 2025, Okada defeated Kenny Omega in a Winner Takes All match to win the AEW International Championship and become the inaugural AEW Unified Champion.	
3	Jon Moxley	December 27, 2025	Worlds End	Hoffman Estates, IL	1	329+	This was the final of the 2025 Continental Classic, which was only for the Continental Championship. This subsequently ended the title's unification with the AEW International Championship, thus rendering the AEW Unified Championship inactive.	
