= Worlds End (2025) =

All Elite Wrestling pay-per-view event

- Promotional poster featuring Swerve Strickland, Samoa Joe, MJF, and "Hangman" Adam Page
- Promotion: All Elite Wrestling
- Date: December 27, 2025
- City: Hoffman Estates, Illinois
- Venue: Now Arena
- Attendance: 8,968
- Buy rate: 140,000

Pay-per-view chronology
← Previous; Full Gear	Next → Revolution

Worlds End chronology
← Previous; 2024	Next → 2026

The 2025 Worlds End was a professional wrestling pay-per-view (PPV) event produced by All Elite Wrestling (AEW). It was the third annual Worlds End and took place on December 27, 2025, at the Now Arena in the Chicago suburb of Hoffman Estates, Illinois. It hosted the semifinals and final of the 2025 Continental Classic.

Thirteen matches were contested at the event, including four on the "Zero Hour" pre-show. In the main event, MJF defeated defending champion Samoa Joe, Swerve Strickland, and "Hangman" Adam Page in a four-way match to win the AEW World Championship. In other prominent matches, Jon Moxley defeated Kazuchika Okada in the Continental Classic final to win the AEW Continental Championship, subsequently ending the title's unification with the AEW International Championship and rendering the AEW Unified Championship inactive, and Kris Statlander defeated Jamie Hayter to retain the AEW Women's World Championship.

== Production ==
=== Background ===
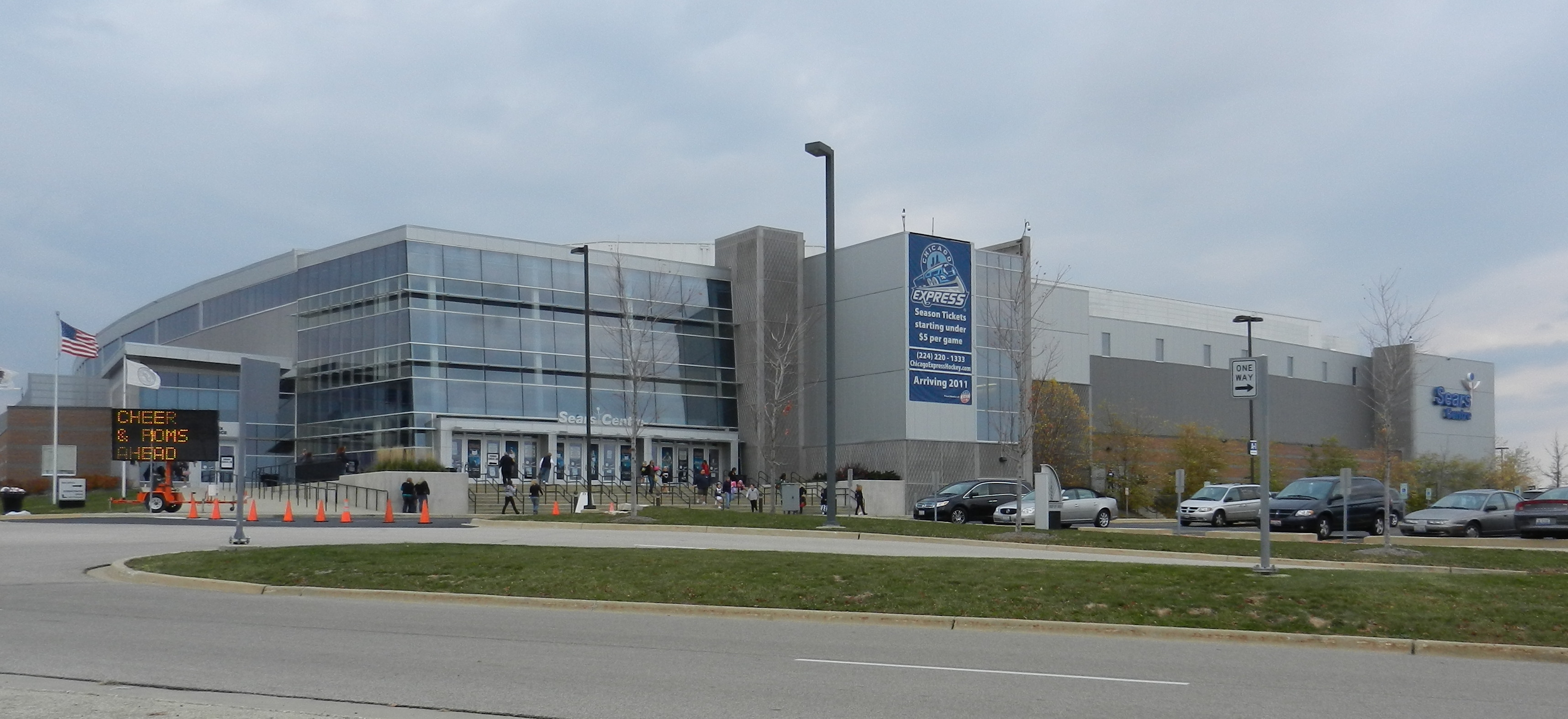
The event was held at the Now Arena in Hoffman Estates, Illinois.

Worlds End is an annual professional wrestling pay-per-view (PPV) event produced in late December by All Elite Wrestling (AEW) since 2023. The event notably hosts the finals of the annual Continental Classic (C2) for the AEW Continental Championship. On July 31, 2025, AEW announced that the third annual Worlds End would take place on December 27 at the Now Arena in Hoffman Estates, Illinois, a suburb of Chicago. This was AEW's fifth PPV event at the venue, following the 2019, 2021, 2022, and 2024 editions of All Out, and the seventh overall in the Chicago metropolitan area after the 2022 edition of Forbidden Door and the 2023 All Out (both held at the United Center). The venue also hosted the first edition of All In. Tickets for Worlds End went on sale September 22. The event was presented by Bell's Two Hearted IPA.

=== Broadcast outlets ===
Other on-screen personnel
Role	Name
Commentators	Excalibur (Pre-show and PPV)
Commentators	Tony Schiavone (Pre-show and PPV)
Commentators	Nigel McGuinness (Pre-show and PPV)
Commentators	Bryan Danielson (PPV)
Commentators	Don Callis {Okada vs. Takeshita)
Spanish commentators	Carlos Cabrera
Spanish commentators	Alvaro Riojas
Spanish commentators	Ariel Levy
Ring announcers	Arkady Aura
Ring announcers	Justin Roberts
Referees	Aubrey Edwards
Referees	Brandon Martinez
Referees	Bryce Remsburg
Referees	Mike Posey
Referees	Paul Turner
Referees	Rick Knox
Referees	Stephon Smith
Pre-show hosts	Renee Paquette
Pre-show hosts	RJ City
Pre-show hosts	Jeff Jarrett
Pre-show hosts	Lexy Nair

Worlds End aired via PPV through traditional cable and satellite providers. In the United States, AEW PPV events are also available on HBO Max at an exclusive discounted rate for subscribers. The event was also available in the United States and internationally on Prime Video, Triller TV, PPV.com, and YouTube. Additionally in the United States, the show was broadcast at Dave & Buster's and Tom's Watch Bar locations.

=== Storylines ===
Worlds End featured 13 professional wrestling matches, including four on the Zero Hour pre-show, that involved different wrestlers from pre-existing feuds and storylines. Storylines were produced on AEW's weekly television programs, Dynamite and Collision.

As the incumbent Continental Champion, Kazuchika Okada was automatically entered into the C2. Months prior in July at All In: Texas, Okada had also won the AEW International Championship, subsequently holding and defending both titles under the AEW Unified Championship. Amid confusion over the Unified title in regards to the C2, it was confirmed that only the Continental Championship would be the prize of the 2025 tournament, with Okada only carrying the International Championship belt throughout the league matches. It was also revealed that should Okada lose the Continental Championship in the C2, he would also lose the Unified Championship.

At Full Gear, Samoa Joe defeated "Hangman" Adam Page to win the AEW World Championship after Hook turned on Page. After the bout, Swerve Strickland returned and feigned attacking Page, attacking The Opps dojo instead. On the following episode of Dynamite, Page challenged Joe to a rematch at Worlds End. During Collision: Winter is Coming, Strickland declared himself the rightful contender following Page's initial challenge to Joe. At Dynamite: Holiday Bash on December 17, during the contract signing for the match at Worlds End, MJF made his return since his last appearance at All Out and invoked his Casino Gauntlet match cash-in contract to put him into the match with Joe, Page, and Strickland, making it a four-way match for the title.

== Results ==
No.	Results	Stipulations	Times
1^{P}	Sisters of Sin (Julia Hart and Skye Blue) defeated Hyan and Maya World by pinfall	Tag team match	6:10
2^{P}	Eddie Kingston defeated Zack Gibson (with James Drake) by pinfall	Singles match	5:40
3^{P}	Máscara Dorada and Bandido (with Alex Abrahantes) defeated Don Callis Family (Mark Davis and Rocky Romero) by pinfall	Tag team match	7:30
4^{P}	JetSpeed (Kevin Knight and "Speedball" Mike Bailey) and Jurassic Express ("Jungle" Jack Perry and Luchasaurus) defeated Josh Alexander and The Demand (Ricochet, Bishop Kaun, and Toa Liona) by pinfall	Eight-man tag team match	9:00
5	Kazuchika Okada (c) defeated Konosuke Takeshita by pinfall	Continental Classic Semifinal; Had Okada lost, he would have vacated both the AEW Continental Championship and AEW Unified Championship, (Note: The Unified Championship is only active when a wrestler simultaneously holds the Continental and International championships.) which would have guaranteed a new Continental Champion in the final.	17:25
6	Jon Moxley defeated Kyle Fletcher by technical submission	Continental Classic Semifinal	22:35
7	FTR (Dax Harwood and Cash Wheeler) (c) (with Stokely) defeated Bang Bang Gang (Juice Robinson and Austin Gunn) by pinfall	Chicago Street Fight for the AEW World Tag Team Championship	17:00
8	The Babes of Wrath (Harley Cameron and Willow Nightingale) (c) defeated Mercedes Moné and Athena by pinfall	Tag team match for the AEW Women's World Tag Team Championship	13:10
9	Darby Allin defeated Gabe Kidd by pinfall	Singles match	12:50
10	"Timeless" Toni Storm, Roderick Strong, and The Conglomeration (Mark Briscoe and Orange Cassidy) defeated Death Riders (Claudio Castagnoli, Daniel Garcia, Wheeler Yuta, and Marina Shafir) by pinfall	Mixed Nuts Mayhem	12:45
11	Kris Statlander (c) defeated Jamie Hayter by pinfall	Singles match for the AEW Women's World Championship	18:10
12	Jon Moxley defeated Kazuchika Okada (c) by pinfall	Continental Classic Final for the AEW Continental Championship; Since Okada lost, he was forced to relinquish the AEW Unified Championship.	20:10
13	MJF defeated Samoa Joe (c), Swerve Strickland (with Prince Nana), and "Hangman" Adam Page by pinfall	Four-way match for the AEW World Championship; MJF invoked his right to a world title shot won in the Casino Gauntlet at All In: Texas to receive this match.	20:35
(c) / – the champion(s) heading into the match; P / – the match was broadcast on the pre-show

=== Continental Classic Tournament ===
Legend
Qualified to league final

Participants
Blue League		Gold League	
Konosuke Takeshita	13	Kyle Fletcher (Note: Fletcher won the Gold League due to his head-to-head victory against Okada.)	9
Jon Moxley	9	Kazuchika Okada (c)	9
Claudio Castagnoli	7	Kevin Knight	7
Orange Cassidy	6	Pac	7
Máscara Dorada II	6	Jack Perry (Note: Darby Allin sustained an injury during his first match with Kevin Knight; he was replaced in the tournament by Jack Perry.)	6
Roderick Strong	3	Mike Bailey	6
(c) – the incumbent champion at the beginning of the tournament

Tournament overview
Blue League	Cassidy	Castagnoli	Dorada	Moxley	Strong	Takeshita
Cassidy	—N/a	Castagnoli (12:28)	Cassidy (11:12)	Moxley (17:03)	Cassidy (13:23)	Takeshita (15:26)
Castagnoli	Castagnoli (12:28)	—N/a	Dorada (12:00)	Castagnoli (15:08)	Strong (3:22)	Draw (20:00)
Dorada	Cassidy (11:12)	Dorada (12:00)	—N/a	Moxley (12:55)	Dorada (9:20)	Takeshita (11:40)
Moxley	Moxley (17:03)	Castagnoli (15:08)	Moxley (12:55)	—N/a	Moxley (18:10)	Takeshita (17:29)
Strong	Cassidy (13:23)	Strong (3:22)	Dorada (9:20)	Moxley (18:10)	—N/a	Takeshita (13:15)
Takeshita	Takeshita (15:26)	Draw (20:00)	Takeshita (11:40)	Takeshita (17:29)	Takeshita (13:15)	—N/a
Gold League	Bailey	Fletcher	Knight	Okada	Pac	Perry
Bailey	—N/a	Bailey (19:10)	Bailey (12:56)	Okada (16:02)	Pac (15:16)	Perry (12:41)
Fletcher	Bailey (19:10)	—N/a	Fletcher (13:03)	Fletcher (16:46)	Pac (14:54)	Fletcher (19:18)
Knight	Bailey (12:56)	Fletcher (13:03)	—N/a	Knight (13:53)	Draw (20:00)	Knight (11:56)
Okada	Okada (16:02)	Fletcher (16:46)	Knight (13:53)	—N/a	Okada (13:32)	Okada (12:58)
Pac	Pac (15:16)	Pac (14:54)	Draw (20:00)	Okada (13:32)	—N/a	Perry (14:28)
Perry	Perry (12:41)	Fletcher (19:18)	Knight (11:56)	Okada (12:58)	Perry (14:28)	—N/a

Semifinals; Worlds End; December 27, 2025
B1	Konosuke Takeshita	17:17
G2	Kazuchika Okada (c)	Pin
G1	Kyle Fletcher	23:33
B2	Jon Moxley	TKO

Championship Final; Worlds End; December 27, 2025
G2	Kazuchika Okada (c)	20:01
B2	Jon Moxley	Pin
