= 2025 Continental Classic =

Professional wrestling tournament

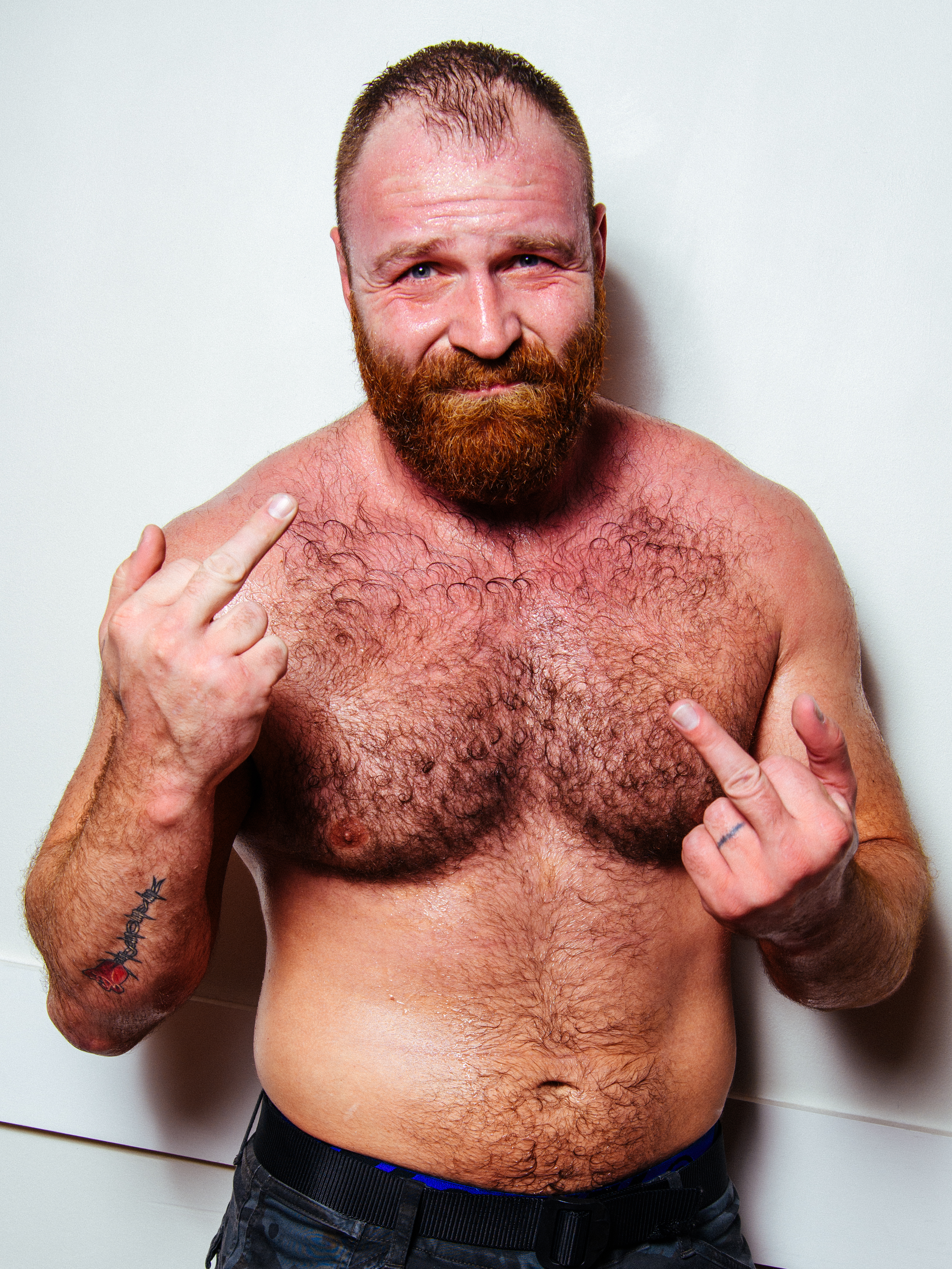
- 2025 Continental Classic winner Jon Moxley

Tournament information
- Sport: Professional wrestling
- Location: United States; United Kingdom
- Dates: November 26, 2025–December 27, 2025
- Tournament format: Two-block round-robin tournament
- Host: All Elite Wrestling
- Venue: Various arenas (see matches)
- Participants: 13 (Note: Darby Allin sustained an injury during his first match with Kevin Knight; he was replaced in the tournament by Jack Perry.)

Final positions
- Champion: Jon Moxley
- Runner-up: Kazuchika Okada

The 2025 Continental Classic (C2) was a professional wrestling round-robin tournament hosted by the American promotion All Elite Wrestling (AEW). The third annual edition of the AEW Continental Classic began on the Thanksgiving Eve episode of Dynamite on November 26, 2025, and culminated at the Worlds End pay-per-view (PPV) event on December 27, 2025. Tournament matches were held under "Continental Rules", which featured 20-minute time limits, no one allowed at ringside, and outside interference strictly prohibited. The prize of the tournament was the AEW Continental Championship. The 2025 tournament winner was Jon Moxley.

== Overview ==
Established in 2023, the Continental Classic (C2) is an annual professional wrestling tournament hosted by All Elite Wrestling (AEW) that starts after the promotion's Full Gear pay-per-view (PPV) event in mid-November and ends at the Worlds End PPV at the end of December. The tournament takes place in a round-robin format, with two blocks of six wrestlers – titled the Blue and Gold Leagues – wrestling each other across AEW's television shows, Dynamite, and Collision.

Matches are held under "Continental Rules": each match has 20-minute time limit, no other wrestlers are allowed at ringside, and outside interference is strictly prohibited under threat of penalty. Similar to most soccer leagues, match winners obtain three points for a win, and drawn matches give one point to each participant, and ties are broken based on head-to-head record. After the round-robin phase, the winner of each league will face the runner-up of the opposite league in a playoff match at Worlds End to determine the two championship finalists, who will wrestle each other for the AEW Continental Championship later in the evening.

As the reigning Continental Champion, Kazuchika Okada was awarded automatic entry into the tournament. Two of his fellow stable-mates in the Don Callis Family, Konosuke Takeshita and Kyle Fletcher, announced their entry at Full Gear. The remaining nine entrants and the draw for the blocks was announced in a Selection Special on November 24: Okada, Fletcher, Darby Allin, "Speedball" Mike Bailey, Kevin Knight, and Pac were drawn into the Gold League; and Takeshita, Orange Cassidy, Claudio Castagnoli, Máscara Dorada, Jon Moxley, and Roderick Strong were drawn into the Blue League. After Allin was declared medically unable to continue the tournament after his first match against Knight, he was replaced by Jack Perry.

In July 2025 at All In: Texas, reigning Continental Champion Kazuchika Okada defeated Kenny Omega in a Winner Takes All Championship unification match to win the AEW International Championship and become the inaugural AEW Unified Champion; since Okada won as the Continental Champion, the Unified Championship adopted the rules of the Continental Championship. Although he defended both belts as one between All In and the Continental Classic, the tournament was only for the Continental Championship, meaning if Okada lost, it would end the unification, thus forcing him to relinquish the Unified Championship.

== Matches ==
Legend
Gold League match
Blue League match
Semifinal match
Tournament final match

Tournament matches
Dates	Show	Venue	Matches		Time
November 26	Thanksgiving Eve Dynamite	The Pinnacle; Nashville, Tennessee	G	Kyle Fletcher defeated Kazuchika Okada by pinfall	16:46
November 26	Thanksgiving Eve Dynamite	The Pinnacle; Nashville, Tennessee	B	Jon Moxley defeated Máscara Dorada by technical submission	12:55
November 26	Thanksgiving Eve Dynamite	The Pinnacle; Nashville, Tennessee	G	Kevin Knight defeated Darby Allin by pinfall	11:56
November 26	Thanksgiving Eve Dynamite	The Pinnacle; Nashville, Tennessee	B	Claudio Castagnoli defeated Orange Cassidy by pinfall	12:28
November 26	Thanksgiving Collision (aired November 27)	The Pinnacle; Nashville, Tennessee	G	Pac defeated Mike Bailey by technical submission	15:16
November 26	Thanksgiving Collision (aired November 27)	The Pinnacle; Nashville, Tennessee	B	Konosuke Takeshita defeated Roderick Strong by pinfall	13:15
December 3	Dynamite	Fishers Event Center; Fishers, Indiana	G	Kazuchika Okada defeated Pac by pinfall	13:32
December 3	Dynamite	Fishers Event Center; Fishers, Indiana	G	Kyle Fletcher defeated Kevin Knight by pinfall	13:08
December 3	Dynamite	Fishers Event Center; Fishers, Indiana	B	Claudio Castagnoli defeated Jon Moxley by pinfall	15:08
December 6	Collision	Greater Columbus Convention Center; GalaxyCon; Columbus, Ohio	B	Orange Cassidy defeated Roderick Strong by pinfall	13:23
December 6	Collision	Greater Columbus Convention Center; GalaxyCon; Columbus, Ohio	B	Máscara Dorada defeated Claudio Castagnoli by pinfall	12:00
December 6	Collision	Greater Columbus Convention Center; GalaxyCon; Columbus, Ohio	B	Konosuke Takeshita defeated Jon Moxley by pinfall	17:29
December 10	Dynamite: Winter Is Coming	Gateway Center Arena; Atlanta, Georgia	G	Kazuchika Okada defeated Jack Perry by pinfall	12:58
December 10	Dynamite: Winter Is Coming	Gateway Center Arena; Atlanta, Georgia	G	Mike Bailey defeated Kyle Fletcher by pinfall	19:10
December 13	Collision: Winter Is Coming	Utilita Arena Cardiff; Cardiff, Wales, United Kingdom	B	Claudio Castagnoli vs. Konosuke Takeshita went to a time-limit draw	20:00
December 13	Collision: Winter Is Coming	Utilita Arena Cardiff; Cardiff, Wales, United Kingdom	G	Mike Bailey defeated Kevin Knight by pinfall	12:56
December 17	Dynamite: Holiday Bash	Co-op Live; Manchester, England, United Kingdom	B	Jon Moxley defeated Roderick Strong by pinfall	18:10
December 17	Dynamite: Holiday Bash	Co-op Live; Manchester, England, United Kingdom	G	Pac defeated Kyle Fletcher by pinfall	14:54
December 17	Collision: Holiday Bash	Co-op Live; Manchester, England, United Kingdom	B	Orange Cassidy defeated Máscara Dorada by pinfall	11:12
December 17	Collision: Holiday Bash (aired December 20)	Co-op Live; Manchester, England, United Kingdom	G	Jack Perry defeated Mike Bailey by pinfall	12:41
December 17	Collision: Holiday Bash (aired December 20)	Co-op Live; Manchester, England, United Kingdom	G	Kevin Knight defeated Kazuchika Okada by pinfall	13:53
December 20	Dynamite on 34th Street (aired December 24)	Hammerstein Ballroom; New York City, New York	B	Konosuke Takeshita defeated Orange Cassidy by pinfall	15:26
December 20	Dynamite on 34th Street (aired December 24)	Hammerstein Ballroom; New York City, New York	B	Máscara Dorada defeated Roderick Strong by pinfall	9:20
December 20	Dynamite on 34th Street (aired December 24)	Hammerstein Ballroom; New York City, New York	G	Jack Perry defeated Pac by pinfall	14:28
December 21	Christmas Collision (aired December 25)	Hammerstein Ballroom; New York City, New York	G	Kyle Fletcher defeated Jack Perry by pinfall	19:18
December 21	Christmas Collision (aired December 25)	Hammerstein Ballroom; New York City, New York	B	Konosuke Takeshita defeated Máscara Dorada by pinfall	11:40
December 21	Christmas Collision (aired December 25)	Hammerstein Ballroom; New York City, New York	B	Roderick Strong defeated Claudio Castagnoli by pinfall	3:22
December 21	Christmas Collision (aired December 25)	Hammerstein Ballroom; New York City, New York	G	Kevin Knight vs. Pac went to a time-limit draw	20:00
December 21	Christmas Collision (aired December 25)	Hammerstein Ballroom; New York City, New York	B	Jon Moxley defeated Orange Cassidy by pinfall	17:03
December 21	Christmas Collision (aired December 25)	Hammerstein Ballroom; New York City, New York	G	Kazuchika Okada defeated Mike Bailey by pinfall	16:02
December 27	Worlds End	Now Arena; Hoffman Estates, Illinois	SF	Kazuchika Okada defeated Konosuke Takeshita by pinfall	17:17
December 27	Worlds End	Now Arena; Hoffman Estates, Illinois	SF	Jon Moxley defeated Kyle Fletcher by technical submission	23:33
December 27	Worlds End	Now Arena; Hoffman Estates, Illinois	F	Jon Moxley defeated Kazuchika Okada by pinfall	20:01

== Leagues ==
Legend
Qualified to league final

Participants
Blue League		Gold League	
Konosuke Takeshita	13	Kyle Fletcher (Note: Fletcher won the Gold League due to his head-to-head victory against Okada.)	9
Jon Moxley	9	Kazuchika Okada (c)	9
Claudio Castagnoli	7	Kevin Knight	7
Orange Cassidy	6	Pac	7
Máscara Dorada II	6	Jack Perry	6
Roderick Strong	3	Mike Bailey	6
(c) – the incumbent champion at the beginning of the tournament

Tournament overview
Blue League	Cassidy	Castagnoli	Dorada	Moxley	Strong	Takeshita
Cassidy	—N/a	Castagnoli (12:28)	Cassidy (11:12)	Moxley (17:03)	Cassidy (13:23)	Takeshita (15:26)
Castagnoli	Castagnoli (12:28)	—N/a	Dorada (12:00)	Castagnoli (15:08)	Strong (3:22)	Draw (20:00)
Dorada	Cassidy (11:12)	Dorada (12:00)	—N/a	Moxley (12:55)	Dorada (9:20)	Takeshita (11:40)
Moxley	Moxley (17:03)	Castagnoli (15:08)	Moxley (12:55)	—N/a	Moxley (18:10)	Takeshita (17:29)
Strong	Cassidy (13:23)	Strong (3:22)	Dorada (9:20)	Moxley (18:10)	—N/a	Takeshita (13:15)
Takeshita	Takeshita (15:26)	Draw (20:00)	Takeshita (11:40)	Takeshita (17:29)	Takeshita (13:15)	—N/a
Gold League	Bailey	Fletcher	Knight	Okada	Pac	Perry
Bailey	—N/a	Bailey (19:10)	Bailey (12:56)	Okada (16:02)	Pac (15:16)	Perry (12:41)
Fletcher	Bailey (19:10)	—N/a	Fletcher (13:03)	Fletcher (16:46)	Pac (14:54)	Fletcher (19:18)
Knight	Bailey (12:56)	Fletcher (13:03)	—N/a	Knight (13:53)	Draw (20:00)	Knight (11:56)
Okada	Okada (16:02)	Fletcher (16:46)	Knight (13:53)	—N/a	Okada (13:32)	Okada (12:58)
Pac	Pac (15:16)	Pac (14:54)	Draw (20:00)	Okada (13:32)	—N/a	Perry (14:28)
Perry	Perry (12:41)	Fletcher (19:18)	Knight (11:56)	Okada (12:58)	Perry (14:28)	—N/a

Semifinals; Worlds End; December 27, 2025
B1	Konosuke Takeshita	17:17
G2	Kazuchika Okada (c)	Pin
G1	Kyle Fletcher	23:33
B2	Jon Moxley	TKO

Championship Final; Worlds End; December 27, 2025
G2	Kazuchika Okada (c)	20:01
B2	Jon Moxley	Pin

== See also ==
- List of All Elite Wrestling tournaments
