= All Elite Wrestling =

American professional wrestling promotion

All Elite Wrestling, LLC
- Trade name: All Elite Wrestling
- Type: Private
- Industry: Professional wrestling
- Founded: January 1, 2019; 7 years ago
- Founder: Tony Khan
- Headquarters: 1 Tower Court, Suite 402; Jacksonville, Florida, United States
- Area served: Worldwide
- Key people: Tony Khan (President, CEO & General Manager); Shahid Khan (Lead investor); Kosha Irby (Chief Operating Officer); Michael Mansury (Executive Vice President & Global Head of Production); Tyson Smith, Matthew and Nicholas Massie (Executive Vice Presidents)
- Products: Home video; Live events; Merchandise; Music; Pay-per-view; Publishing; TV; Video on demand
- Services: Licensing
- Owner: Beatnik Investments, LLC (Shad Khan & Tony Khan) (90%); Skydance (<10%)
- Divisions: AEW Games; AEW Heels; AEW Music; AEW Together; MyAEW; Shop AEW
- Website: allelitewrestling.com

All Elite Wrestling (AEW) is an American professional wrestling promotion based in Jacksonville, Florida. It is majority owned and operated by Tony Khan, who serves as president and chief executive officer.

AEW was founded in 2019 by Khan with professional wrestlers Kenny Omega, Cody Rhodes, and brothers Matt and Nick Jackson serving as initial co-executive vice presidents, following the success of the independent wrestling event All In in 2018. AEW's roster primarily appears on its weekly broadcast television shows Dynamite and Collision, as well as on its streaming and pay-per-view (PPV) programming. AEW wrestlers have also appeared at events produced by or co-produced with other promotions, including Ring of Honor (ROH), which was acquired by Khan in 2022. AEW's programming is available in 220 territories in 50 languages.

As with other professional wrestling promotions, AEW promotes predetermined contests that are athletic and entertainment-based featuring storyline-driven, scripted, and partially choreographed matches. However, matches require considerable athletic skill and often include moves that can put performers at risk of serious injury or death if not performed correctly.

With an estimated value of US$2 billion, AEW is the second-largest wrestling promotion in the world and the third most valuable combat sports-related promotion in the world.

== History ==
=== Background and formation (2017–2019) ===
In May 2017, professional wrestling journalist Dave Meltzer commented that the American promotion Ring of Honor (ROH) could not sell 10,000 tickets for an event. This was a feat that no U.S.-based wrestling promotion besides WWE had accomplished since World Championship Wrestling (WCW) in 1999. The comment was responded to by professional wrestlers Cody Rhodes and The Young Bucks (the tag team of Matt Jackson and Nick Jackson). At the time, they were both top stars signed to ROH and good friends both inside and outside the ring as members of the group Bullet Club, and later part of the sub-Bullet Club faction, The Elite.

They promoted and held an independent professional wrestling event called All In in September 2018, featuring wrestlers from ROH as well as other promotions. The event sold out in 30 minutes and had the largest audience in attendance for a professional wrestling show in the United States held and organized by promoters not affiliated with WWE or WCW since 1993. The event was attended by 11,263 people. The event was acclaimed, and it led to much online speculation that Cody and The Young Bucks would expand their ambitions and create their own professional wrestling promotion or do a second All In event. Reportedly, people in the television industry were also very impressed with the show.

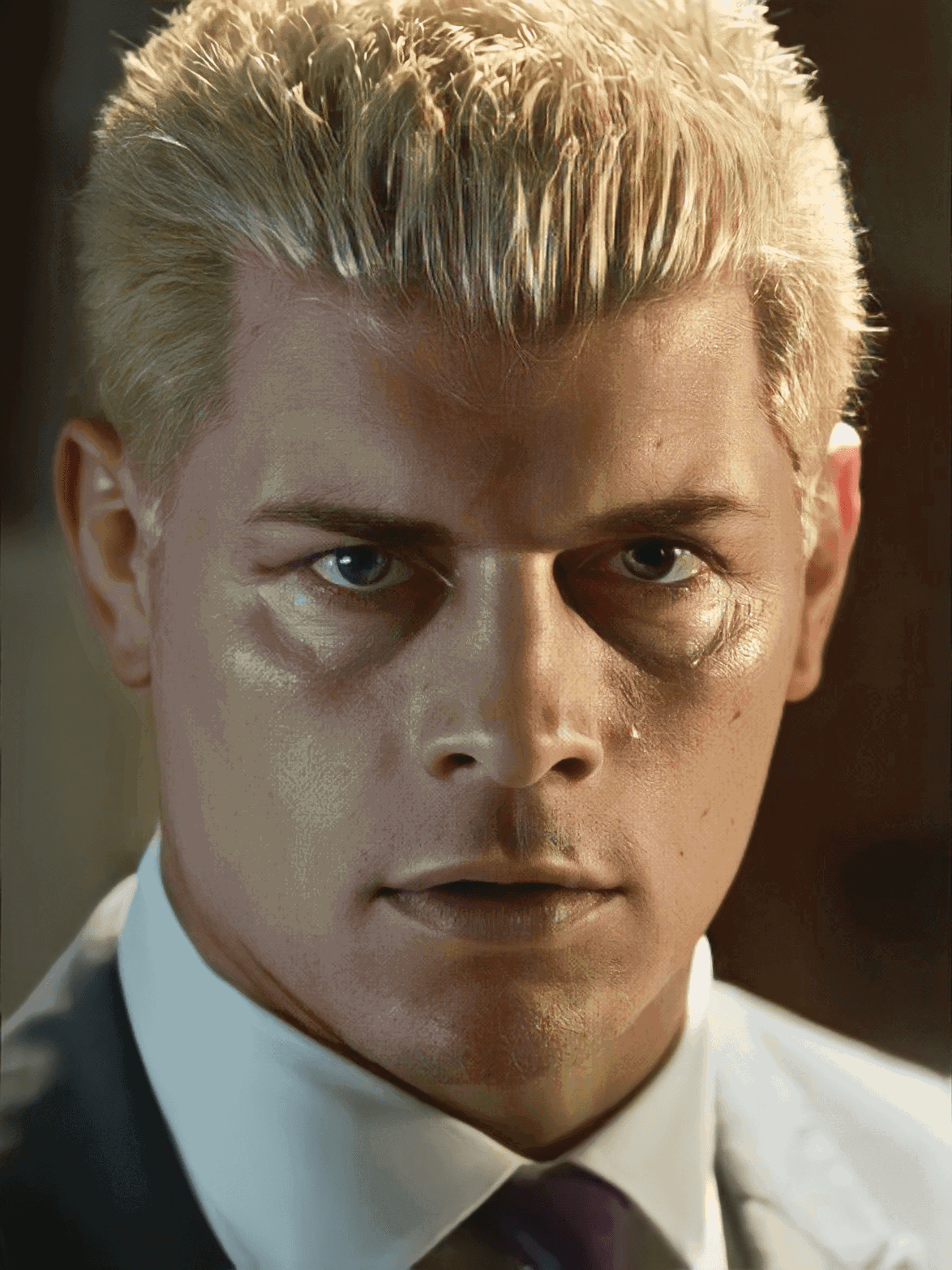
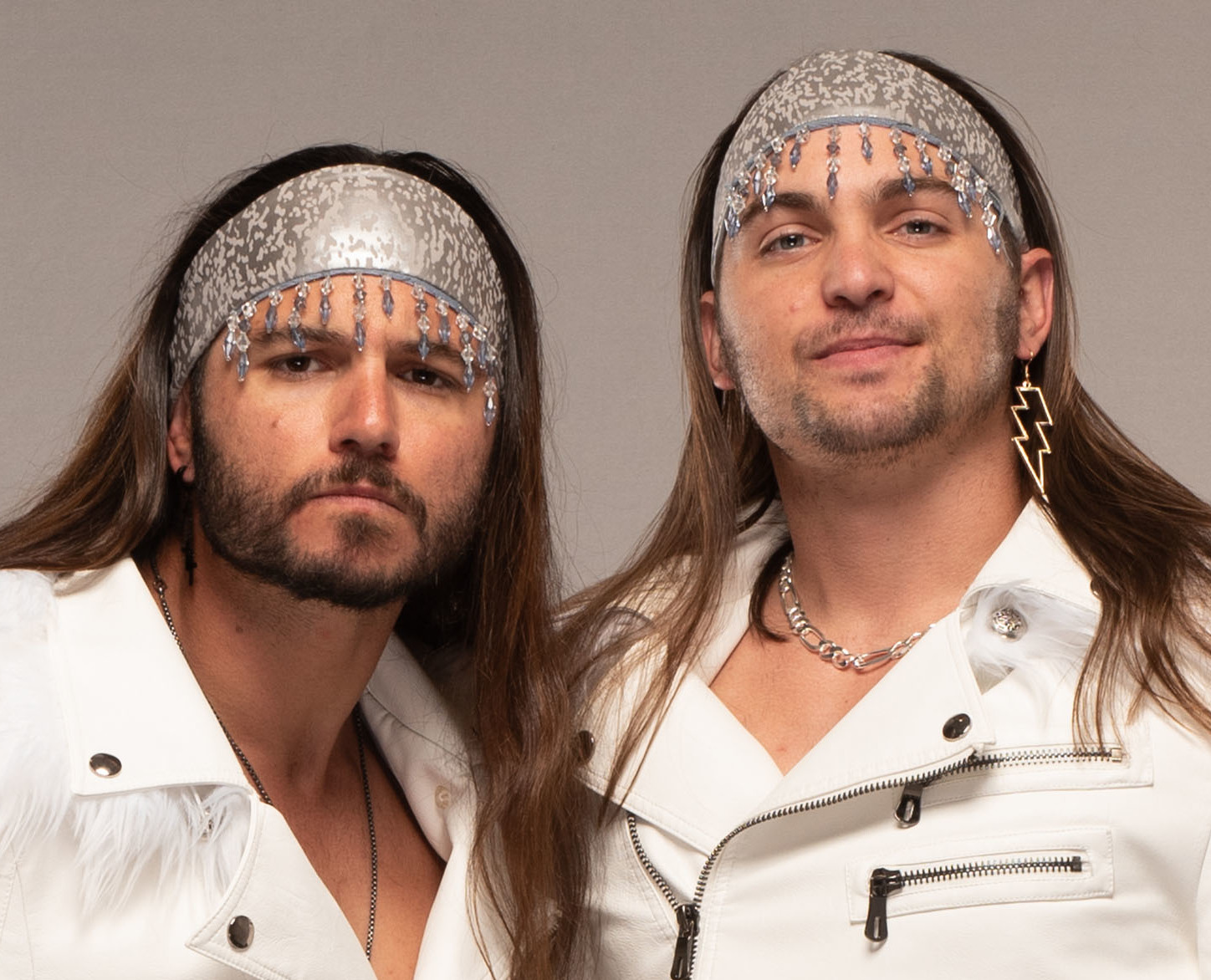
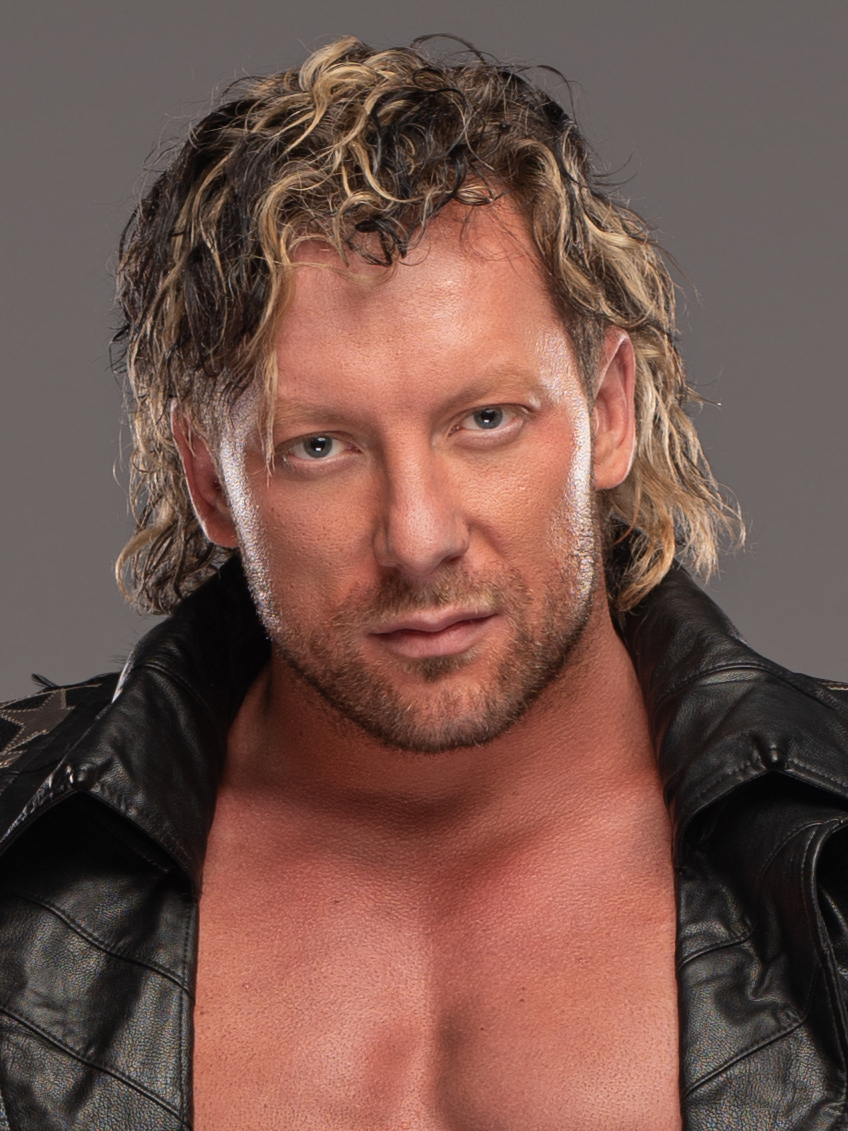
Left to right: Cody Rhodes, Matt Jackson and Nick Jackson, and Kenny Omega helped start AEW.
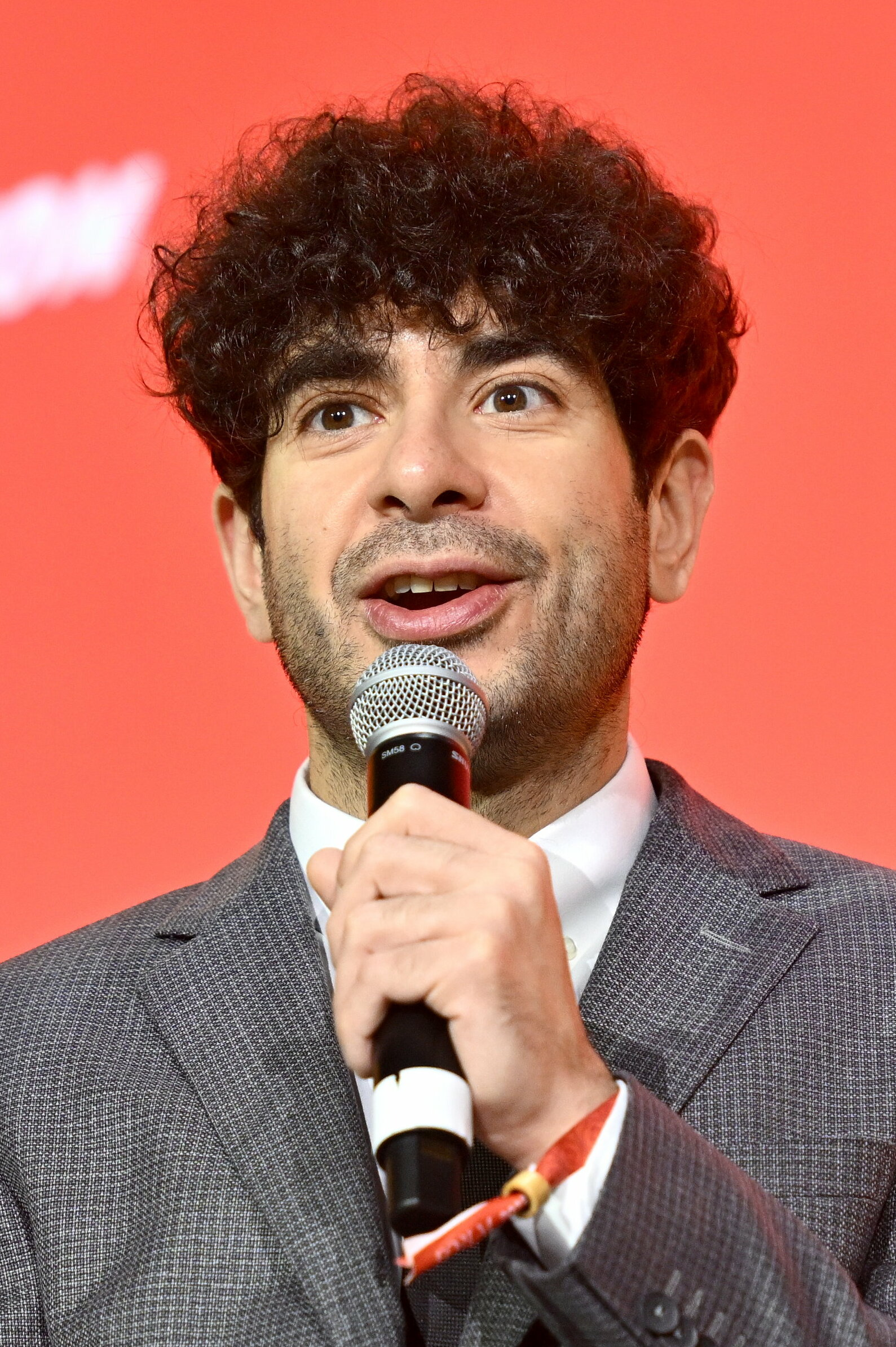
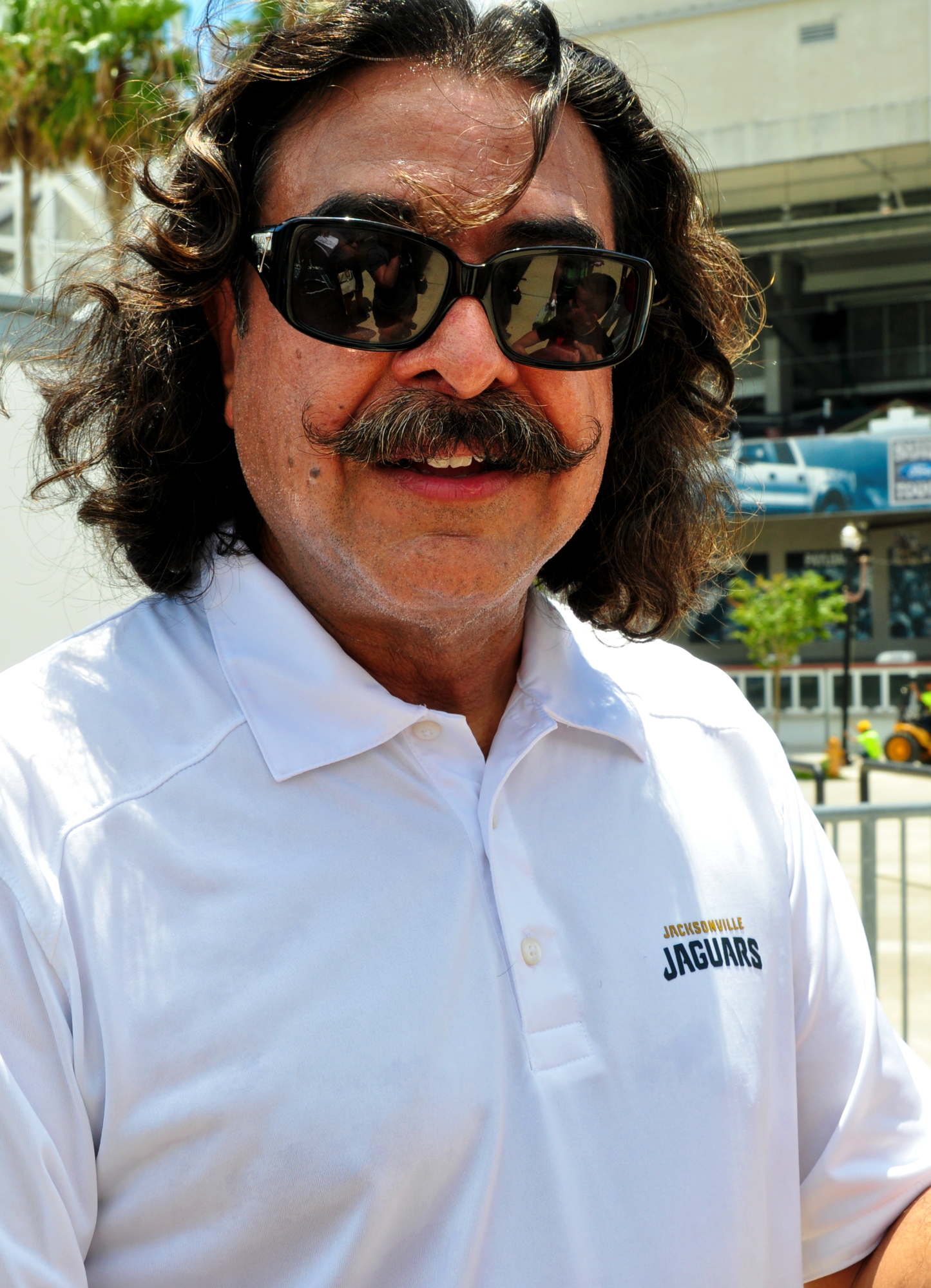
Tony Khan (left) is the president and chief executive officer (CEO) of AEW, while his father Shahid Khan (right) is the lead investor.

On November 5, 2018, several trademarks were filed in Jacksonville, Florida, that indicated the launch of All Elite Wrestling. Names filed for trademark included: All Elite Wrestling, AEW All Out, All Out, AEW, Double or Nothing, Tuesday Night Dynamite, AEW Double or Nothing, and several logos. In December 2018, Cody, The Young Bucks, Hangman Page, and several other wrestlers left ROH. The official announcement of AEW's creation came at midnight Eastern Time on January 1, 2019, in an episode of Being the Elite, a YouTube web series created by and featuring The Elite, wherein Page looked at his phone to show the All Elite Wrestling logo on his smartphone. Also announced in the episode was Double or Nothing on Cody & The Bucks' smartphones, AEW's inaugural event and sequel to All In.

On January 2, 2019, Cody, The Young Bucks, & Page officially signed with the promotion as competitors as well as serving as AEW's co-Executive vice presidents, (with the exception of Page), while entrepreneur, football executive, and longtime wrestling fan Tony Khan was announced as the president of the company. Tony's father, Shahid, was reportedly backing the promotion as lead investor. The Khans are billionaires and part of the ownership group of the Jacksonville Jaguars NFL team and Fulham F.C..

Cody's wife, Brandi Rhodes, was announced as the company's chief brand officer on January 3, 2019. On January 8, 2019, the company held its inaugural press conference on the forecourt of the TIAA Bank Field, where they announced talents that were going to perform as part of the promotion, including former ROH wrestlers the team of SoCal Uncensored (Christopher Daniels, Scorpio Sky, and Frankie Kazarian), independent wrestlers Britt Baker, Joey Janela, MJF, Penelope Ford, and former WWE wrestlers Pac and Chris Jericho.

On February 7, 2019, the group held a press conference where tickets were released for Double or Nothing. Other big announcements included Kenny Omega joining as a wrestler and the company's fourth co-Executive Vice President, as well as the signings of Sammy Guevara, The Lucha Brothers (Pentagón Jr. and Rey Fénix) and Best Friends (Trent Beretta and Chuck Taylor).

=== Early history and TNT debut (2019–2020) ===
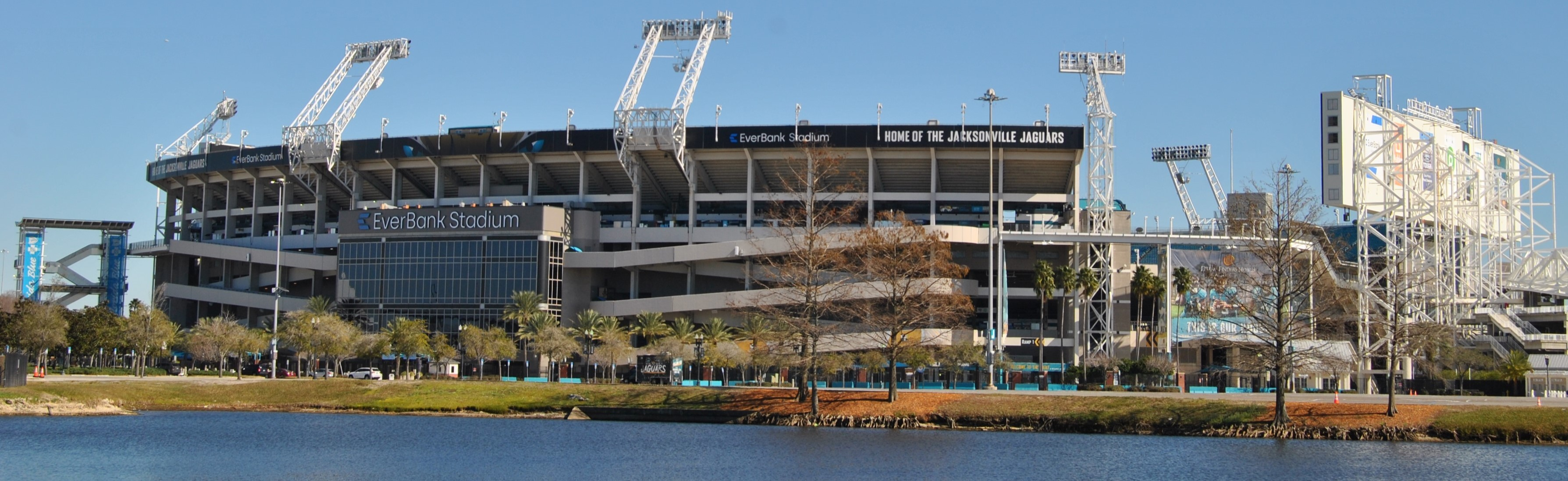
AEW initially was headquartered at EverBank Stadium in Jacksonville, Florida.

The original logo used from January 1, 2019, to January 3, 2023.

On May 15, 2019, AEW and WarnerMedia announced a deal for a weekly primetime show airing live on TNT, the network that formerly had broadcast WCW's Monday Nitro during the Monday Night Wars (1995–2001). CBS Sports described AEW as "the first company with major financial backing to take a swing at beginning to compete with WWE on a major level in nearly two decades".

On May 25, 2019, AEW produced their first pay-per-view (PPV), Double or Nothing. It took place at the MGM Grand Garden Arena in the Las Vegas suburb of Paradise, Nevada and saw the debut of Jon Moxley, formerly known as Dean Ambrose in WWE. Also during Double or Nothing, pro-wrestling veteran Bret Hart unveiled the AEW World Championship belt. During the summer, AEW produced two more events, Fyter Fest in June and Fight for the Fallen in July.

On August 31, 2019, AEW produced their second pay-per-view event, All Out as a spiritual successor to All In. At the event, the AEW Women's World Championship belt was unveiled and in the main event, Chris Jericho defeated "Hangman" Adam Page to become the inaugural AEW World Champion. On September 19, TNT's website listed AEW's show as AEW Dynamite with a one-hour preview show scheduled for October 1 at 8 p.m. On October 2, Dynamite debuted on TNT which averaged 1.409 million viewers, which made it the largest television debut on TNT in five years. Also on October 2, WWE's NXT would make its two-hour debut on USA Network (the previous two episodes featured the first hour on USA with the second hour on the WWE Network), and they averaged 891,000 viewers. Dynamite beat out NXT in viewership and more than doubled its competition in the key adults 18–49 demographic, scoring 878,000 viewers compared to NXT's 414,000. This would also mark the beginning of the "Wednesday Night Wars". Prior to and after the episodes, untelevised matches were filmed to air on AEW Dark on the following Tuesdays (except before PPV events, where the episodes aired Fridays) on AEW's YouTube channel. On November 9, AEW produced their third pay-per-view event, Full Gear. In the main event, Jon Moxley defeated Kenny Omega in an unsanctioned Lights Out match.

On January 15, 2020, WarnerMedia and AEW announced a $175 million contract extension for Dynamite on TNT through 2023 and that AEW would be launching an upcoming second television weekly show, later revealed as AEW Rampage and airing on Friday nights.

=== Effects of the COVID-19 pandemic (2020–2021) ===
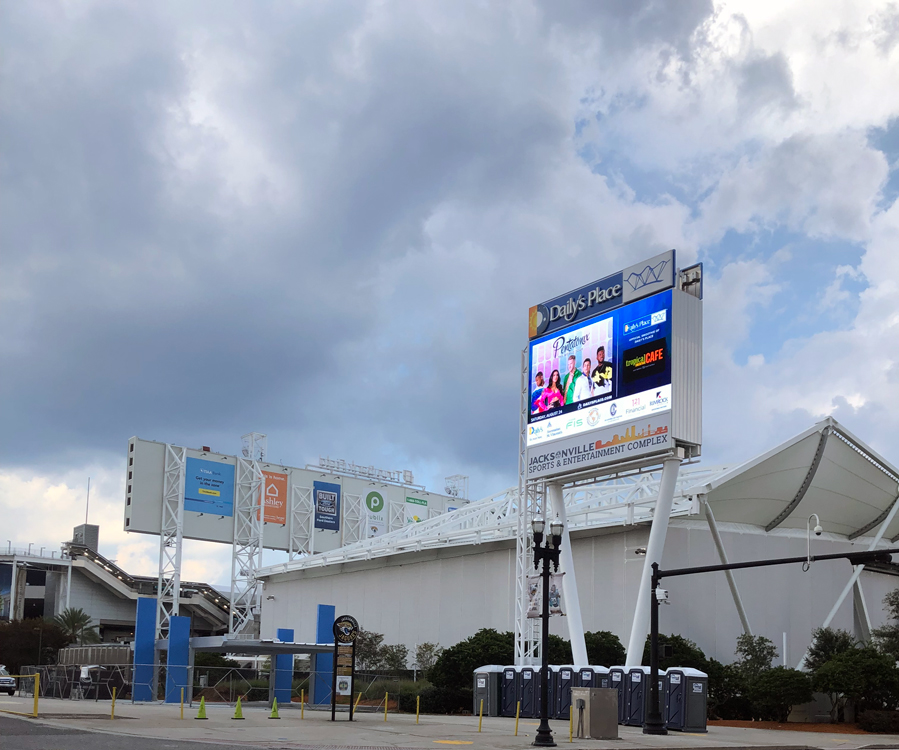
From March 2020 to July 2021, AEW hosted most of its events at Daily's Place in Jacksonville, Florida (which is connected to EverBank Stadium), due to the COVID-19 pandemic.

As other sports cancellations and postponements were being announced in March 2020, AEW began to be impacted by the American onset of the COVID-19 pandemic. Following the suspension of the 2019–20 NBA season after two players tested positive for the virus, the March 18 episode of Dynamite was held without spectators from Daily's Place in Jacksonville, Florida. That year's Double or Nothing was supposed to take place on May 23, but on April 8, the MGM Grand Garden Arena announced that they had canceled all events up through May 31 due to the pandemic. At that point, Nevada had been in a state of emergency since March 12, banning all public gatherings indefinitely. In response, AEW announced that Double or Nothing would still proceed as planned but from Daily's Place, as well as TIAA Bank Field for the main event match.

On April 13, Florida Governor Ron DeSantis had deemed AEW, like WWE, an essential business critical to the state's economy, and had added an exception under the state's stay-at-home order for employees of a "professional sports and media production" that is closed to the public and has a national audience. In an interview on the AEW Unrestricted podcast, Tony Khan stated the pandemic has deprived AEW millions of dollars in revenue from live events.

On August 3, 2020, Jazwares released the first line of AEW action figures and toys.

AEW announced the return of ticketed fans to live events on August 20, following the Centers for Disease Control and Prevention (CDC) guidelines including wearing masks, physical distancing, and temperature checks. Beginning with their August 27 episode of Dynamite, they allowed up to 10 percent capacity at Daily's Place and up to 15 percent capacity starting with that year's All Out.

On November 10, 2020, the promotion announced AEW Games, the company's video game brand. AEW revealed that three games were in development; AEW Casino: Double or Nothing and AEW Elite GM for mobile devices, and AEW Fight Forever developed by former WWE 2K developer Yuke's.

For the Double or Nothing pay-per-view in May 2021, the venue was raised to full capacity, making it the first time AEW held an event with a full capacity crowd since March 2020.

=== Return to live touring and ROH purchase (2021–2022) ===
In May 2021, AEW announced that they would be returning to live touring, beginning with a special episode of Dynamite titled Road Rager on July 7 in Miami, Florida, in turn becoming the first major professional wrestling promotion to resume live touring during the COVID-19 pandemic. Road Rager was also the first in a four-week span of special Dynamite episodes called the "Welcome Back" tour, which continued with the two-part Fyter Fest on July 14 and 21 in Cedar Park and Garland, Texas, respectively, and then concluded with Fight for the Fallen on July 28 in Charlotte, North Carolina. In June, AEW announced that the September 22 episode of Dynamite would be another special episode titled Grand Slam and would be AEW's New York City debut, a city primarily known as home territory for WWE, as well as their first full event held in a stadium. The event would also become AEW's most attended event, with over 20,000 spectators.

On August 20, 2021, CM Punk joined AEW. It was Punk's comeback to professional wrestling after leaving WWE in 2014.

On August 27, 2021, it was revealed that Dark would begin being taped at its own set within Universal Studios Florida in Orlando at Soundstage 21.

On the March 2 episode of Dynamite, Tony Khan announced that he had purchased Ring of Honor from Sinclair Broadcast Group, including its brand assets, intellectual property, and video library. It was clarified through a press release issued that night that the acquisition was made through an entity separate from AEW and wholly owned by Khan. In a media scrum following AEW's Revolution PPV on March 6, Khan revealed that he eventually planned to run ROH separately from AEW, and also indicated that ROH could be used as a developmental brand for AEW. On May 4, the sale of ROH to Tony Khan was officially completed. Later in 2022, AEW promoted its first events outside of the United States, when they held a live broadcast of Dynamite on October 12 in Toronto, Ontario, Canada, followed by a Rampage taping the next night at the same venue.

=== Expansion of live and broadcast events (2022–present) ===
The logo used on AEW's first weekly show Dynamite since 2024

Following the 2022 All Out pay-per-view, then-reigning AEW World Champion CM Punk used the post-PPV media scrum to air out-of-character grievances against multiple members of the roster, including Colt Cabana, Adam Page and AEW Executive Vice Presidents Kenny Omega and The Young Bucks. After Punk's portion of the scrum concluded, it later emerged that Punk and his friend Ace Steel had a legitimate brawl with Omega, the Young Bucks and Christopher Daniels following the Bucks and Omega storming into the former's locker room. The incident was dubbed by fans and reporters as "Brawl Out". In the aftermath, all involved were suspended, Omega and the Bucks were stripped of their AEW World Trios Championship and Punk was stripped of the AEW World Championship. Steel's contract was terminated by AEW a month later, The Bucks and Omega returned at Full Gear and Punk returned the following June after undergoing surgery for an injury from his match with Moxley.

On February 1, 2023, AEW announced that they would be expanding its live events schedule and would begin doing house shows, with its house show series titled AEW: House Rules. AEW's first House Rules event took place on March 18 at the Hobart Arena in Troy, Ohio. Prior to House Rules, AEW had only held one house show, titled The House Always Wins, which occurred at Daily's Place in Jacksonville on April 9, 2021. On April 5, 2023, AEW announced that they would revive the All In name—which Tony Khan acquired the rights to after purchasing ROH—for AEW's United Kingdom debut to be held at London's Wembley Stadium on August 27, 2023.

On May 17, 2023, AEW announced a third weekly television show titled AEW Collision, with its first episode featuring Punk's return to the company and Luchasaurus capturing the AEW TNT Championship from Wardlow. The show airs live, with some exceptions, and premiered on TNT on Saturday, June 17, 2023.

In June 2023 AEW released AEW Fight Forever after years of development; the game received mixed reviews, being praised for its throwback style of arcade gameplay but criticized for limited presentation, modes and customization.

In August 2023, AEW held All In at Wembley Stadium, a pay-per-view that received critical acclaim; with a live paid attendance number of 72,265, it became one of the highest attended events in professional wrestling history. The event is also notable for being CM Punk's final AEW event, as he was fired with cause by Khan and the AEW Discipline Committee, following a legitimate backstage altercation with Jack Perry; Perry was also later suspended indefinitely.

At the conclusion of the All In event in London, AEW announced that it would return to Wembley Stadium on August 25, 2024, with tickets going on sale on December 1, 2023. All In subsequently took place at Wembley Stadium as scheduled, coinciding with the United Kingdom's August Bank Holiday weekend. The event was notable for featuring the AEW debut of former WWE wrestler Ricochet, the return of British wrestler Jamie Hayter, who had been out with an injury since May 2023, the appearance of former AEW wrestler Sting, and the in-ring return of English wrestler and London native Nigel McGuinness following his retirement in 2011 and subsequent transition into color commentary.

On October 2, 2024, AEW and Warner Bros. Discovery (WBD) announced a multi-year contract extension; the contract maintained most of AEW's existing programs on TBS and TNT (aside from Rampage, which was cancelled), while adding digital rights for Max (including rights to simulcast live AEW programs, and a rolling library of past television episodes and PPVs) beginning in January 2025. Later in 2025, AEW pay-per-views will also become available for purchase via Max; although they will still be sold via television providers and other platforms, they will be sold at a discount on Max, and the service will be promoted as the main outlet for AEW pay-per-views.

In January 2026, amidst a proposed Paramount acquisition of Warner Bros. Discovery assets, it was reported that Warner Bros. Discovery owned a minority stake of AEW, which was later transferred to Skydance Corporation following their acquisition closure in October 2026.

On March 9, 2026, in partnership with Kiswe, AEW launched MyAEW, an over-the-top streaming service and digital television network available worldwide outside of the United States and Canada. The service hosts all episodes of AEW's programs and all PPV events, live and on-demand, as well as hosting the archive for all prior programs and PPVs. It also hosts the archive for ROH. AEW's first PPV to stream on MyAEW was Revolution.

== Programming ==
Prior to Dynamite and pay-per-view events, AEW released a "Road to..." and "Countdown to..." series of videos on its official YouTube channel. The videos consist of interviews, video packages, and backstage segments. The series is used to hype pre-existing matches, as well as create new rivalries.

In November 2019, AEW announced Bash at the Beach, a nine-day series of events, featuring two episodes of Dynamite, including one aboard Chris Jericho's Rock 'N' Wrestling Rager at Sea.

In February 2021, AEW announced their newest show AEW Dark: Elevation, which began airing on March 15. The series premiered new episodes on the AEW YouTube channel on Mondays at 7 p.m. ET as a complement to AEW Dark. On May 19, 2021, amid TNT's acquisition of rights to the National Hockey League, AEW announced that Dynamite would move to sister channel TBS in January 2022. TNT would subsequently receive two new AEW programs, including a new hour-long Friday-night show known as Rampage beginning August 13, and a series of quarterly specials.

The quarterly specials would be known as Battle of the Belts, with the first special airing on January 8, 2022. Beginning with the fourth special on October 7, 2022, Battle of the Belts was moved to Friday nights, airing immediately after Rampage at 11 p.m. ET to avoid potential counterprogramming, particularly against WWE's pay-per-views.

In May 2023, AEW and WBD announced a third weekly television series—Collision—a two-hour program which would be broadcast on Saturday nights by TNT beginning June 17. As part of the premiere and a new contractual agreement to only air its main programming on WBD networks, AEW discontinued both Dark and Dark: Elevation, and Rampage was repositioned to focus on developmental talent in a similar fashion. Beginning with the seventh special on July 15, 2023, Battle of the Belts would be moved back to Saturday nights and would air live after Collision.

On the February 22, 2023, episode of Dynamite, Tony Khan and Adam Cole announced a new television program beginning on March 29 called AEW: All Access. The program was a mini-series and ran six episodes, airing from March 29 to May 10, 2023. It was a reality television show about the lives of the promotion's wrestlers and featured behind-the-scenes footage. The program aired immediately after Dynamite at 10 p.m. ET on TBS. Though Khan stated that the show performed well and was positively received, there was no confirmation of a second season.

Battle of the Belts aired its final episode on October 19, 2024, while Rampage aired its final episode on December 27, 2024, which was the New Year's Smash special.

On April 16, 2025, AEW broadcast Spring BreakThru live on TBS and Max. The broadcast was the 289th episode of Dynamite, making it the longest-running prime time weekly pro-wrestling program in Turner Sports history, surpassing the former WCW's Monday Nitro, which had a total of 288 episodes that aired on TNT from September 1995 to March 2001.

Broadcast

Program	Original release	Original networks	Notes
AEW Dynamite	October 2, 2019–present	TBS and HBO Max	AEW's live flagship television program.
AEW Collision	June 17, 2023–present	TNT and HBO Max	AEW's second live television program.

Online exclusive

Program	Original release	Original network	Notes
AEW Stories	July 25, 2023–present	YouTube	The stories of individual AEW wrestlers through interviews and backstage access.
AEW Timelines	August 1, 2023–present	YouTube	Highlights greatest moments, matches, and wrestlers in AEW's history.

Former

Program	Aired	Network	Notes
AEW All Access	March 29 – May 10, 2023	TBS	Reality television program that featured behind-the-scenes footage.
AEW Battle of the Belts	January 8, 2022 – October 17, 2024	TNT	Quarterly television specials.
AEW Dark	October 8, 2019 – December 16, 2025	YouTube and HBO Max	Online show that featured matches that were taped before or after Dynamite or Rampage.
AEW Dark: Elevation	March 15, 2021 – April 24, 2023	YouTube	Online show that featured untelevised matches from Dynamite tapings which involved wrestlers from AEW's roster and the independent circuit.
AEW Rampage	August 13, 2021 – December 27, 2024	TNT	Taped supplemental television program.
AEW Unrestricted	February 24, 2020 – March 26, 2026	YouTube	Featured interviews with AEW wrestlers hosted by Tony Schiavone, Will Washington, and Aubrey Edwards.
Hey! (EW)	March 13, 2022 – December 7, 2025	YouTube	Featured interviews with AEW wrestlers hosted by RJ City.
Johnny Loves Taya	February 14, 2024–March 21, 2026	YouTube	Reality show that featured real life husband and wife Johnny TV and Taya Valkyrie.
TNT Overdrive	August 10–31, 2024	TNT	Clip show that was presented by various AEW wrestlers.

=== Events ===
AEW pay-per-view events are available on Amazon Prime Video in the U.S., Canada, and the UK. In select international markets, AEW PPVs are available on Triller TV, PPV.COM, and YouTube. They are also available via traditional PPV outlets in the U.S. and Canada, and are carried by all major satellite providers.

=== International rights ===
On May 8, 2019, AEW reached a media rights deal with British media company ITV plc to broadcast AEW shows on ITV4 with pay-per-views being broadcast on ITV Box Office starting with Double or Nothing on May 25, 2019. However, after ITV Box Office ceased operations in January 2020, ITV no longer broadcasts AEW pay-per-views in the UK.

On February 19, 2020, AEW reached a new media rights deal with German media company Sky Deutschland (which previously broadcast WWE and Total Nonstop Action Wrestling shows) to broadcast AEW pay-per-views on Sky Select Event.

In summer 2020, all AEW programs (with the exception of AEW Collision) have been broadcast in Italy by Sky Italia through its sports' channels.

On January 22, 2021, TNT Africa announced that the channel would begin airing Dynamite on Friday nights in Sub-Saharan Africa. The show premiered on February 5, 2021.

On August 2, 2021, AEW announced a deal with Discovery Inc. to air Dynamite and Rampage on Eurosport in India starting on August 15, 2021. On February 10, 2022, Warner TV announced that they would be airing Dynamite and Rampage in Poland. On April 8, 2022, it was announced that as part of the AEW and NJPW working relationship, Dynamite and Rampage would air in Japan on NJPW World. On May 5, 2022, AEW announced that Dynamite and Rampage would air on TNT in Spain starting on June 17, 2022, and later live from June 19, 2022.

AEW events aired in Latin America on Space from late 2020 to late 2022. The promotion airs in Hispanic America on Vix since July 2023, and in Brazil on AEW Plus.

In January 2023, AEW sold its broadcasting rights to streaming service DAZN in 42 territories in Europe and Central Asia.

On October 9, 2024, AEW signed a multi-year deal with Fox Sports Mexico, carrying its weekly shows, and pay-per-views on Fox Sports Premium. The network also planned to produce a weekly AEW-related studio show on Monday nights.

== Partnerships ==
AEW has partnership agreements with several promotions around the world. Additionally, as Tony Khan owns both AEW and Ring of Honor (ROH), wrestlers from AEW frequently appear on ROH and vice versa; however, although ROH belts are often defended on AEW shows the reverse is rarely true.

Shortly after its founding in early 2019, AEW struck partnership deals with promotions Lucha Libre AAA Worldwide (AAA) in Mexico and Oriental Wrestling Entertainment (OWE) in China. By late 2020 and through 2021, AEW was collaborating with other wrestling promotions in the U.S. and abroad, with Tony Khan stating he needed to be "open to allow all of the partnerships with the multiple promotions that AEW is working with." In December of that year, AEW began a partnership with Impact Wrestling, which saw AEW World Champion Kenny Omega making appearances on Impact!. Omega would later make his in-ring debut for Impact at Hard to Kill, defeating Rich Swann to win the Impact World Championship at the Rebellion event, making him the first person to hold championships in both Impact and AEW concurrently. In October 2021, the working relationship between AEW and Impact ended following the latter's Bound for Glory PPV.

On February 3, 2021, at the Beach Break television special, AEW started a partnership with New Japan Pro-Wrestling (NJPW). After the main event, Kenta made his AEW debut and hit Jon Moxley with his finishing strike, the Go 2 Sleep. Kenta would later make his AEW in ring debut at the following Dynamite. Over one year later on the April 20, 2022 edition of Dynamite, it was announced that AEW and NJPW reached an agreement to co-produce a pay-per-view event titled AEW×NJPW: Forbidden Door, which took place at the United Center in Chicago on June 26. The event was an acclaimed success and was followed by a second iteration on June 25, 2023, held at Scotiabank Arena in Toronto, which AEW's first PPV outside the U.S. and NJPW's first traditional PPV in Canada.

On March 20, 2022, during Japanese promotion DDT Pro-Wrestling's Judgement event, it was announced that AEW had formed a working relationship with DDT and with Tokyo Joshi Pro-Wrestling that would see wrestlers from both brands appear on AEW programming.

On October 13, 2023, AEW announced a working relationship with Mexico's Consejo Mundial de Lucha Libre promotion.

== Contracts and roster ==
AEW signs most of its talent to exclusive contracts, under which they can appear or perform only on AEW programming and events (which includes ROH) or AEW-approved independent events; additionally, AEW allows periodic appearances from wrestlers and personalities from partner promotions, including Japan's New Japan Pro-Wrestling (NJPW), DDT Pro-Wrestling (DDT), Tokyo Joshi Pro Wrestling (TJPW), Pro Wrestling Noah, and World Wonder Ring Stardom, and Mexico's Consejo Mundial de Lucha Libre (CMLL). In the past, this also included with previous partner promotions, such as Mexico's Lucha Libre AAA Worldwide (AAA, originally Asistencia Asesoría y Administración), China's Oriental Wrestling Entertainment (OWE; defunct, 15 March 2021), and the United States' Total Nonstop Action Wrestling (TNA, formerly Impact Wrestling during partnership), and National Wrestling Alliance (NWA).

AEW has garnered attention for seeking to diversify its roster, including signing international talent. To that end, AEW reportedly offers salaries well above the industry norm, often bidding directly against WWE. AEW's comparatively high salaries have reportedly impacted the industry by driving up the bargaining power of professional wrestlers.

AEW has been criticized for using non-union employees, and its 2025 residence at 2300 Arena in Philadelphia, Pennsylvania was picketed by IATSE 8.

== Video games ==
List of video games based on the company
Year	Title	Developer	
Main series
2020	AEW Casino: Double or Nothing	KamaGames	Android, iOS
2020	AEW Elite General Manager	Crystallized Games	Android, iOS
2023	AEW Fight Forever	Yuke's	Nintendo Switch, PlayStation 4, PlayStation 5, Windows, Xbox Series X/S, Xbox One
2024	AEW Rise to the Top	East Side Games	Android, iOS
2024	AEW Figure Fighters	Immutable X	Android, iOS

== Championships ==
As of November 12, 2026

=== Men's division ===
Singles

Championship	Current champion	Reign	Date	Days	Location	Notes	Ref.
AEW World Championship	Will Ospreay	1	August 30, 2026	74	London, England	Defeated Kenny Omega at All In.	
AEW International Championship	Kazuchika Okada	2	August 30, 2026	74	London, England	Defeated previous champion Kyle Fletcher and Konosuke Takeshita in a three-way match at All In.	
AEW Continental Championship	Jon Moxley	1	December 27, 2025	320	Hoffman Estates, Illinois	Defeated Kazuchika Okada in the 2025 Continental Classic final at Worlds End.	
AEW National Championship	Tommaso Ciampa	1	November 7, 2026	5	Miami, Florida	Defeated Andrade El Ídolo on Collision: Chris Jericho's Rock 'N' Wrestling Rager at Sea – Seventh Cruise of a Seventh Cruise.	
AEW TNT Championship	Darby Allin	3	August 30, 2026	74	London, England	Defeated Kevin Knight in a Falls Count Anywhere match at All In.	

Tag teams

Championship	Current champion	Reign	Date	Days	Location	Notes	Ref.
AEW World Tag Team Championship	The Young Bucks (Matt Jackson and Nick Jackson)	4	September 26, 2026	47	Hoffman Estates, Illinois	Defeated previous champions Cage and Cope (Christian Cage and Adam Copeland) and FTR (Dax Harwood and Cash Wheeler) in a three-way Ladder match at All Out.	
AEW World Trios Championship	"Hangman" Adam Page and Brodido (Brody King and Bandido)	2 (3, 3, 2)	October 17, 2026	26	Orlando, Florida	Defeated Swerve Strickland and The New Level (Kofi and Austin Creed) by 2–1 in a two out of three falls match at WrestleDream.	

=== Women's division ===
Singles

Championship	Current champion	Reign	Date won	Days held	Location	Notes	Ref.
AEW Women's World Championship	Mercedes Moné	1	August 30, 2026	74	London, England	Defeated Willow Nightingale at All In.	
AEW TBS Championship	Queen Aminata	1	October 28, 2026	15	St. Louis, Missouri	Defeated Persephone at Fright Night Dynamite.	

Tag Team

Championship	Current champions	Reign	Date won	Days held	Location	Notes	Ref.
AEW Women's World Tag Team Championship	The Brawling Birds (Jamie Hayter and Alex Windsor)	1	August 30, 2026	74	London, England	Defeated Divine Dominion (Megan Bayne and Lena Kross) at All In.	
