= Double or Nothing (2026) =

All Elite Wrestling pay-per-view and livestreaming event

- Promotional poster featuring various AEW wrestlers
- Promotion: All Elite Wrestling
- Date: May 24, 2026
- City: Queens, New York
- Venue: Louis Armstrong Stadium
- Attendance: 14,394
- Buy rate: 204,700

Pay-per-view chronology
← Previous; Dynasty	Next → Forbidden Door

Double or Nothing chronology
← Previous; 2025	Next → —

The 2026 Double or Nothing was a professional wrestling pay-per-view (PPV) event produced by All Elite Wrestling (AEW). It was the eighth annual Double or Nothing and took place during Memorial Day weekend on May 24, 2026, at Louis Armstrong Stadium in Queens, New York.

Twelve matches were contested at the event, including three on the "Buy In" pre-show. In the main event, MJF defeated Darby Allin in a Title vs. Hair match to win the AEW World Championship. In other prominent matches: Konosuke Takeshita defeated Kazuchika Okada to win the AEW International Championship; Jericho, The Hurt Syndicate (Bobby Lashley and Shelton Benjamin), and The Elite (Kenny Omega, Jack Perry, Matt Jackson and Nick Jackson) defeated The Demand (Ricochet, Bishop Kaun and Toa Liona), The Don Callis Family (Mark Davis and Andrade El Ídolo), and The Dogs (David Finlay and Clark Connors) in a Stadium Stampede match; and in the opening bout, Cope and Cage (Adam Copeland and Christian Cage) defeated FTR (Dax Harwood and Cash Wheeler) to win the AEW World Tag Team Championship in a New York Street Fight "I Quit" match where if Cage and Cope had lost, they would have disbanded as a team forever. The event also saw the return of Kyle Fletcher, who had been out with an injury since March as well as the on-screen AEW pay-per-view debut of Hardcore legend Mick Foley, who was signed a few days prior.

== Production ==
=== Background ===
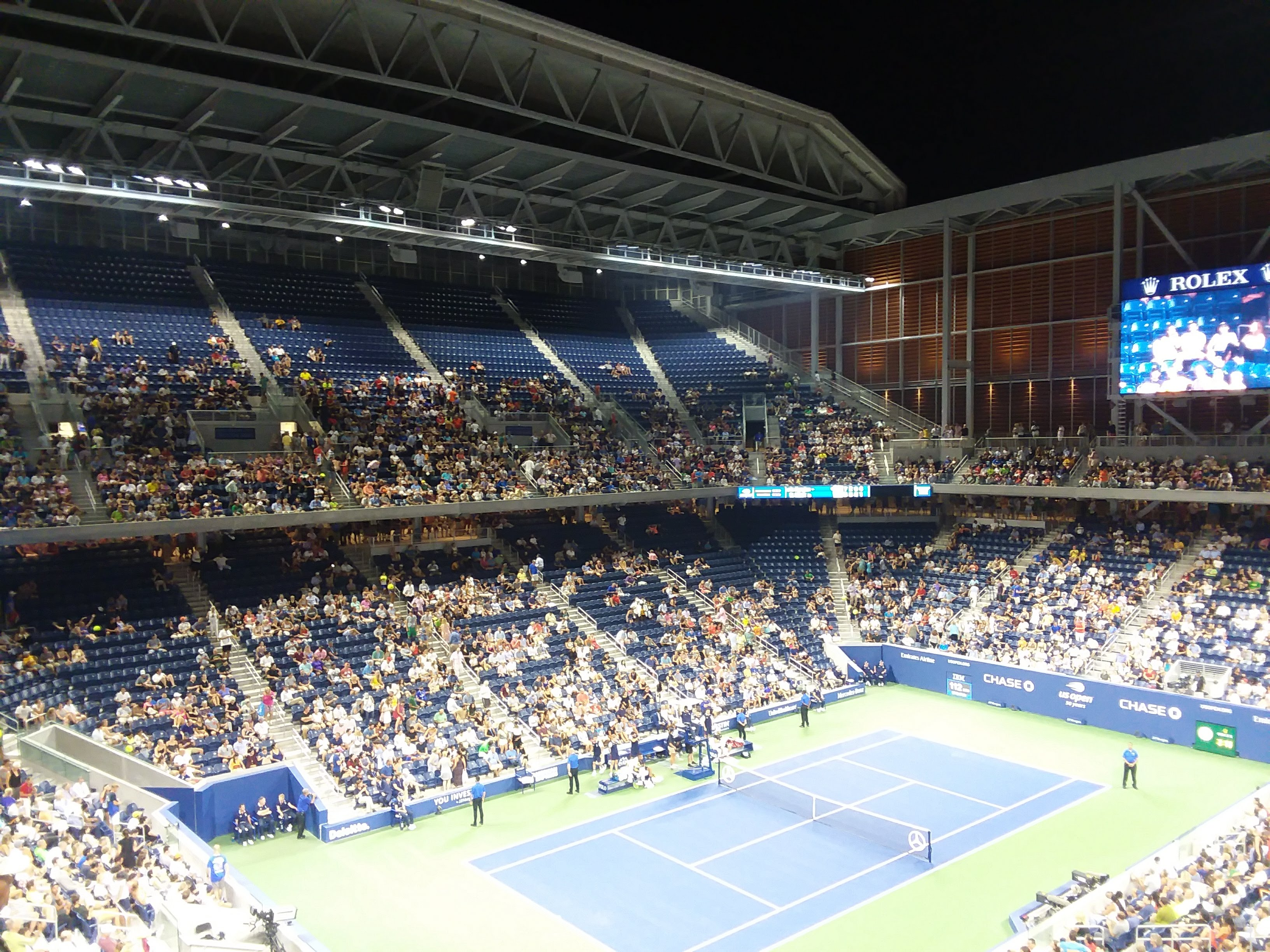
The 2026 Double or Nothing was held at the Louis Armstrong Stadium in Queens, New York.

Double or Nothing is considered one of All Elite Wrestling's (AEW) marquee events, having first been held in 2019, which was the promotion's first professional wrestling event and first pay-per-view (PPV) event produced. It is held annually in May during Memorial Day weekend and is one of AEW's "Big Five" PPVs, which includes All In, All Out, Full Gear, and Revolution, the promotions five biggest annual shows. Since its inception, it carried a gambling theme due to the event being held either in the Las Vegas area or a town/venue associated with casinos.

On February 18, 2026, AEW announced that the eighth annual Double or Nothing event would take place at the Louis Armstrong Stadium in Queens, New York on May 24, 2026. This marked the first AEW pay-per-view to be held in New York City, and the fifth AEW event to be held at the USTA Billie Jean King National Tennis Center following the 2021, 2022, 2023, and 2024 editions of Grand Slam at nearby Arthur Ashe Stadium. Tickets for the event went on sale March 9.

=== Broadcast ===
Double or Nothing aired via PPV through traditional cable and satellite providers. In the United States, AEW PPV events are available on HBO Max at an exclusive rate for subscribers. The event will also be available in the United States and internationally on Prime Video, PPV.com, and YouTube. Additionally in the United States, the show was broadcast at Dave & Buster's and Tom's Watch Bar locations. Outside of the United States and Canada, the event was available to stream on MyAEW.

=== Storylines ===
Double or Nothing featured professional wrestling matches that involved different wrestlers from pre-existing feuds and storylines. Storylines were produced on AEW's weekly television programs, Dynamite and Collision.

After a one-year hiatus, Chris Jericho returned to AEW on the April 1 episode Dynamite, renaming himself mononymously as Jericho. The following week, Jericho signed a new multi-year contract for AEW and began a feud with The Demand (Ricochet, Bishop Kaun, and Toa Liona) after they interrupted him. According to Jericho, his contract allowed him to challenge anyone of his choice, and he chose Ricochet, the group's leader, for a match at Dynasty, where Ricochet defeated Jericho by pinfall. Following his loss, Jericho began an alliance with The Hurt Syndicate (Bobby Lashley, Shelton Benjamin, and MVP) on the April 22 episode, however, The Demand would defeat Jericho, Lashley, and Benjamin at Collision: Playoff Palooza on April 25, with Ricochet pinning Jericho a second time. On the April 29 episode of Dynamite, Jericho was attacked backstage by The Demand. The following week, Jericho called out The Demand in the ring, with Ricochet challenging Jericho for a Stadium Stampede match at Double or Nothing, which he accepted. They eventually brawl, with The Hurt Syndicate later arriving to aid Jericho with Lashley and Benjamin joining Jericho's team. On the May 9 special episode of Collision: Fairway to Hell, Jack Perry defended his AEW National Championship against Don Callis Family member Mark Davis. However, Ricochet, who was the one Perry defeated at Revolution to win the title, interfered, causing Perry to lose the title. Because of that, Perry announced that The Elite (Perry, The Young Bucks, and Kenny Omega) would join Jericho's team. In response, Ricochet recruited Davis. On the May 13 episode of Dynamite, Ricochet also recruited Don Callis Family member Andrade El Ídolo and The Dogs (Clark Connors and David Finlay).

This year's Double or Nothing would feature the Owen Hart Cup, a yearly annual tournament established since 2021 where the winner receives "The Owen" trophy and a commemorative belt. The brackets for men and women was announced on the May 13 episode of Dynamite, with three quarterfinal matches, Samoa Joe vs. Will Ospreay, Bandido vs. Swerve Strickland, and Alex Windsor vs. Willow Nightingale being scheduled for Double or Nothing. The rest of the quarterfinal matches alongside the semifinals will take place on AEW's weekly television programs Dynamite and Collision with tournament finals matches taking place at Forbidden Door on June 28 and the winner receiving a world title match at AEW's flagship show All In on August 30. On the May 20 episode, Nightingale announced that she was injured, and unable to compete in the tournament. Winsor's opponent was then announced to be a Wild Card entrant, with another quarterfinal match, this one between Athena and Mina Shirakawa, scheduled for Double or Nothing.

In March, Darby Allin set his sight on the AEW World Championship, held by MJF, who would then make an agreement with The Don Callis Family to prevent Allin from coming after his championship. Allin was then scheduled to face Andrade El Ídolo at Dynasty, where if Allin won, he would have a shot at the title. Allin won the match, and invoked the title match three days later at AEW Dynamite: Spring BreakThru. Allin went on to defeat MJF to win the title for the first time after successfully landing four coffin drops. The match lasted 2 minutes and 15 seconds, marking the fastest AEW title win in company history. Following the win, Allin began defending the title weekly on Dynamite and Collision. MJF constantly demanded a rematch for the title, however, Allin declined numerous time, stating that MJF had to put something on the line. On the May 6 episode of Dynamite, MJF would again demand a rematch, to which Allin also made a demand for MJF to put his hair on the line to accept the rematch. Initially refusing and attempting to put other things on the line, such as his Burberry scarf and $1,000,000, MJF agreed to put his hair on the line on the following week's Dynamite, with both MJF and Allin signing the contract to make their Title vs. Hair match official.

== Event ==
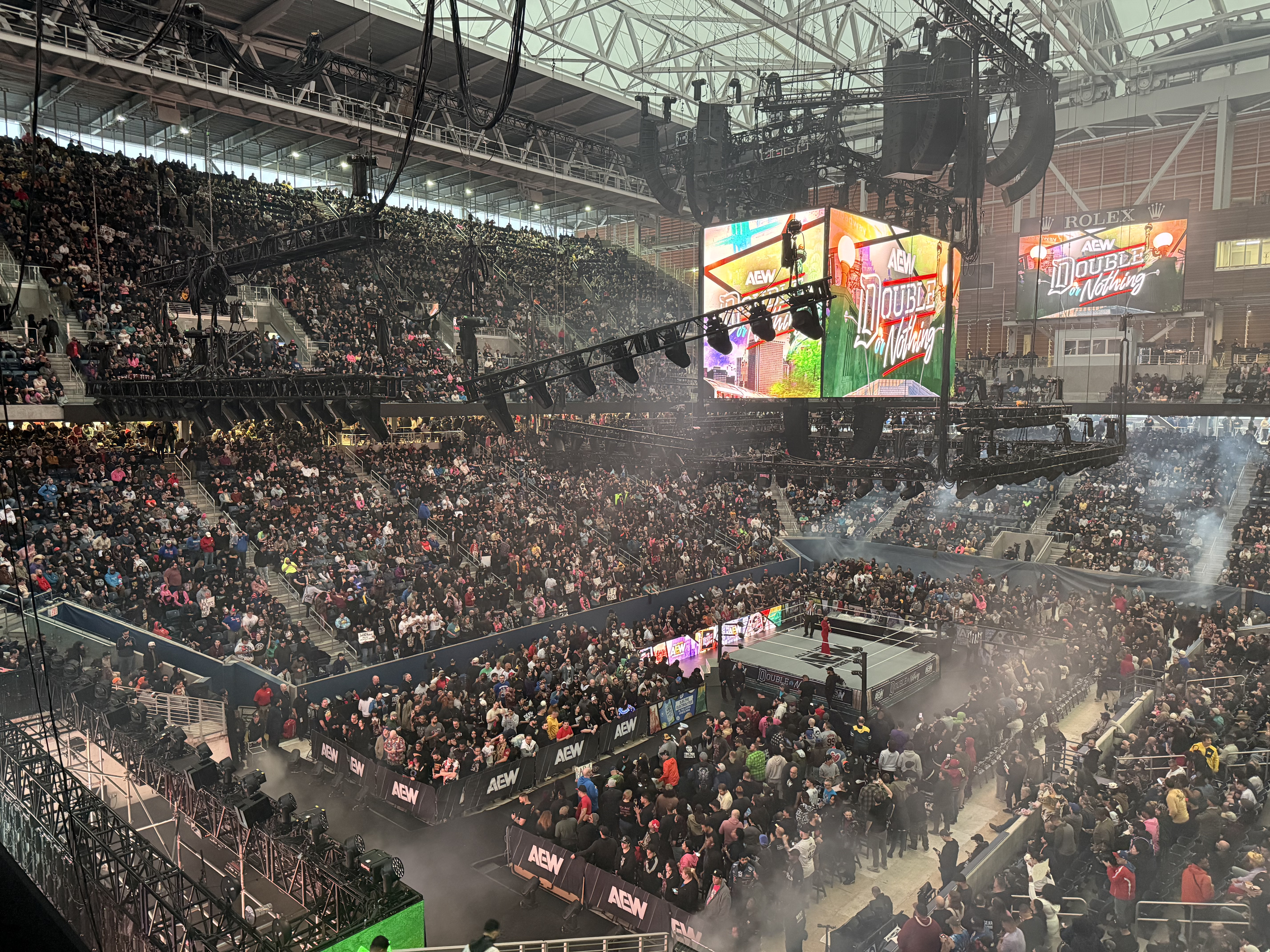
Louis Armstrong Stadium during Double or Nothing

Role	Name
Commentators	Excalibur (Pre-show and PPV)
Commentators	Tony Schiavone (Pre-show and PPV)
Commentators	Nigel McGuinness (Pre-show and PPV)
Commentators	Taz (PPV)
Commentators	Jim Ross (Continental title match)
Commentators	Don Callis (International title match)
Spanish Commentators	Carlos Cabrera
Spanish Commentators	Alvaro Riojas
Spanish Commentators	Ariel Levy
Ring announcers	Arkady Aura
Ring announcers	Justin Roberts
Referees	Aubrey Edwards
Referees	Bryce Remsburg
Referees	Mike Posey
Referees	Paul Turner
Referees	Rick Knox
Referees	Stephon Smith
Pre-show hosts	Renee Paquette
Pre-show hosts	Mick Foley

=== Zero Hour ===
The Zero Hour pre-show began with an introduction for pre-show co-host Renee Paquette, who then introduced wrestling veteran Mick Foley, making his AEW debut as a pre-show co-host. Foley expressed how he fell in love with professional wrestling again thanks to AEW.

The opening match featured AEW Women's World Tag Team Champions Divine Dominion (Megan Bayne and Lena Kross) against Viva Van and Zayda Steel (accompanied by Christopher Daniels) in a five-minute championship eliminator, where if Van and Steel lasted the whole five minutes, they would receive a future tag team title match. Divine Dominion both executed a running kick on the team, Bayne then took down Steel with an exploder suplex, and the team took down Steel with a double chokeslam for the win, with fourteen seconds left, thus Van and Steel failed the championship eliminator.

The next match was a trios match featuring The Opps (Hook, Anthony Bowens, and Katsuyori Shibata) facing the Death Riders (Wheeler Yuta, Claudio Castagnoli, and Daniel Garcia, accompanied by Marina Shafir). During the final moments of the match, Castagnoli successfully landed a DDT on Bowens, but failed to pin him. Bowens was later attacked outside the ring by Yuta and Garcia, and Castagnoli successfully landed his signature uppercut with the help of Yuta and Garcia, pinning Bowens for the win.

The next match featured a 10-man tag team match, consisting of The Conglomeration (Orange Cassidy, Mark Briscoe, Roderick Strong) and Boom & Doom ("Big Boom!" A.J. and Q.T. Marshall, accompanied by Big Justice, The Rizzler, Harley Cameron, and a Vita Coco mascot) going against Shane Taylor Promotions (Shane Taylor, Lee Moriarty, Shawn Dean, Carlie Bravo, and Anthony Ogogo), accompanied by Christyan XO. The Conglomeration and Boom & Doom took the victory after the team landed a triple DDT, with A.J. pinning Bravo for the win. Following the match, Shane Taylor Promotions began staring at the celebration of The Conglomeration and Boom & Doom from the ring apron, seemingly wanting to fight, only to be stopped by Eddie Kingston, Ortiz, and Mance Warner.

Following the match, Zero Hour hosts Renee Paquette and Mick Foley entered the ring to talk about Double or Nothing's main event. Foley predicted that Allin would win the match, which MJF was displeased about and interrupted him. MJF entered the ring, face-to-face with Foley, telling him that he failed during his most prominent moments. Foley responded, claiming that he had lost many matches, but also said that he never lost a match in 2 minutes and 15 seconds, referencing MJF's world title loss to Darby Allin. Foley called MJF's quick loss a disgrace, to which MJF responded with a low-blow to Foley. MJF looked to hit Foley with his Dynamite Diamond Ring, only to be chased out by Darby Allin.

=== Preliminary matches ===
Double or Nothing opened up with FTR (Cash Wheeler and Dax Harwood) defending the AEW World Tag Team Championship against Cage and Cope (Christian Cage and Adam Copeland) in a New York Street Fight "I Quit" match where if Cage and Cope lost, they would disband as a tag team forever. During the match, Cage unveiled barbed wire and wrapped it around the middle rope. Harwood tripped into the rope, and the referee checked on if he wanted to quit, and refused. Harwood later grabbed a toolbox used to build the ring, which was later seized by Cage and used a set of pliers to attack Harwood. Outside the ring, Copeland attempted to attack FTR, but would later be spike piledrived by the team on the spanish announce table. As Copeland was down, FTR focused on Cage, who put his kayfabe injured wrist through a cinderblock and attacked the wrist with chair shots. The referee asked if Cage wanted to quit, which Cage refused by making sexual remarks and insults at FTR. Later, the top rope would be loosened by Harwood and tried to use the rope to choke Cage, but Cage was able to fight back and began choking Harwood. Harwood briefly passes out and his head was placed on top of a chair. Wheeler notices this, and pleaded to stop, claiming that he would say the words. However, this was set up for FTR manager Stokely to attack Copeland with Cage's watch. Beth Copeland then made an appearance to stop Stokely. Later, Harwood had set a table on fire for Beth to go through. However, Beth countered and left Stokely to go through the flaming table by Wheeler's spear. Harwood began to attack Copeland, and told him that if he wanted to see his children, he should quit. Both Cage and Beth attacked Harwood with a low-blow, and put Harwood in a crossface and sharpshooter simultaneously. Refusing to quit, Beth grabbed a baseball bat with nails and handed it to Copeland, pressing into Harwood's head, leaving Harwood to quit and Cage and Cope becoming new AEW World Tag Team Champions and ending FTR's reign at 183 days.

The next match was Kazuchika Okada defending his AEW International Championship against Konosuke Takeshita. During the match, Takeshita performed a piledriver on Okada, but Okada stood back up and executed a dropkick. Both then counter-attacked each other with a lariat, laying both of them down. Later, Okada and Takeshita were on the ring apron, and Okada successfully executed a Rainmaker and later a DDT, leaving Takeshita laying outside the ring. After Takeshita began to recover, he performs a Brainbuster on Okada outside the ring, and Don Callis, who was at the commentary desk commentating, began confronting Takeshita, who ignored Callis. Back in the ring, Takeshita landed a superplex. As he was setting up for another move, Okada countered and attempted a Rainmaker, and was hit with a German Suplex, but was able to avoid the pinfall. After the two began recovering, they both landed elbow strikes at each other. Okada briefly was at an advantage, but Takeshita was able to fight back and land a Blue Thunder Bomb. After a failed attempt at a pinfall, Okada slammed Takeshita and landed another Rainmaker. Okada began setting up Takeshita for yet another Rainmaker, but Takeshita countered and hit Okada with his own Rainmaker. The two stood back up with Okada landing a dropkick, not phasing Takeshita, who executed a knee strike to the face. Another unsuccessful pinfall, Takeshita later hit Okada with a Raging Fire, and successfully pinned Okada, becoming the new AEW International Champion and ending Okada's reign at 316 days. Following the match, Takeshita was kicked out of the Don Callis Family by a returning Kyle Fletcher.

After that was the first quarterfinal match of the Owen Hart Cup, which saw Athena versus Mina Shirakawa. As Athena entered the ring, Shirakawa immediately attacked, with Athena countering and landing a dropkick. Later, Athena sets Shirakawa next to the steel stairs outside the ring, and attempted to land a knee strike. Shirakawa avoids the knee strike, leaving Athena's left knee kayfabe injured. Shortly after, Athena fights back with a dropkick, pushing Shirakawa to an LED board on the barricade, breaking the boards. In the ring, Shirakawa attacked Athena's left knee, but Athena countered and slammed Shirakawa. Unsuccessfully attempting the pinfall, Athena performs a Corkscrew, and Shirakawa recovers with a missile dropkick. Aiding her left knee, Athena attempted a middle rope O-Face, but Shirakawa countered and landed a head-scissors for another failed pinfall. Shirakawa placed Athena in a Figure-four leg lock, but was able to break the submission. Afterward, Athena landed a jumping piledriver and the O-Face, successfully pinning Shirakawa to advance in the semifinals of the tournament.

The fourth match was a no-time limit AEW Continental Championship match in which Jon Moxley defended the title against Kyle O'Reilly, with everyone else banned from ringside. During the match, Moxley countered a kick from O'Reilly, which left O'Reilly to hit the ring post, kayfabe injuring his leg. Moxley takes advantage of the leg by executing a leg lock. O'Reilly was able to break the submission by grabbing the rope. After several body shots to each other, O'Reilly lands a knee strike, a cross-arm breaker and an ankle lock. After the ankle lock, O'Reilly stomps on Moxley's targeted ankle. Moxley was able to roll out to the ring to re-group, and upon entering the ring, lands a cutter on O'Reilly. They both land a clothesline to each other, and after they began recovering, Moxley had the upper hand, connecting a clothesline and the Death Rider on O'Reilly. Moxley followed up with a grapevine submission hold, only to be countered by O'Reilly with an ankle lock on the targeted ankle. Moxley also counters with his own ankle lock on the injured leg, but rolled up Moxley for a failed pinfall. Moxley repositions himself and places O'Reilly in an ankle lock again. O'Reilly taps out and Moxley retains the Continental title. Following the match, O'Reilly's Conglomeration teammates checked on him, with the Death Riders also appearing to celebrate with Moxley. No brawl took place and the two participants shook hands.

The next match was another quarterfinal match of the Owen Hart Cup, which saw Will Ospreay face Samoa Joe. During Joe's entrance and posing in the ring, Ospreay attacked with an OsCutter. Later, Ospreay attempted a backflip dive on Joe. Joe evaded and followed up with a sleeper hold, and throwing Ospreay into the barricade. Ospreay re-enters the ring, to which Joe lands a runnine boot. Ospreay attempts the OsCutter with Joe walking away from the attack. Afterward, Joe landed a Santon, and after unsuccessfully pinning Ospreay, he performed a Boston Crab, then the STF. Ospreay broke the hold by grabbing the ropes. Ospreay was back up and landed a Styles Clash on Joe, which ended with another unsuccessful pinfall. Ospreay followed up with a Hidden Blade and another unsuccessful pinfall attempt. Joe countered another Hidden Blade attempt and powerslammed Ospreay. Later, Joe puts Ospreay in a Coquina Clutch, which left Ospreay temporarily passing out. Upon the referee checking if he's conscious, Ospreay grabbed the rope to break the hold. Ospreay followed up with a Hidden Blade, which Joe kicked out at one during a pinfall attempt. Ospreay landed another Hidden Blade to secure a pinfall victory and advance in the semifinals of the tournament.

After that was another quartfinal match of the Owen Hart Cup, which saw Swerve Strickland versus Bandido. The match began quickly with body shots, but Bandido gained the upper hand by dropkicking Strickland's knee, and executing a standing double stomp and a head-scissors takedown. Strickland recovered quickly and attacked Bandido with a clothesline. Bandido responded with a one-arm military press, and then a missile dropkick outside the ring. Later, Bandido landed a superkick, and followed up with a cannonball dive. Back in the ring, Bandido attacked in the corner, but Strickland moved out the way and stunned Bandido by hitting the top turnbuckle. Bandido recovered with a dropkick and a German Suplex, and followed with a frog splash for an unsuccessful pinfall attempt. Afterward, Bandido was setting up for the 21 Plex, but Strickland countered with a Flatliner. Strickland attempted to pin Bandido with no success, and was later hit with a House Call Kick. Strickland fought back with a Swerve Stomp, followed by another unsuccessful pinfall. Strickland executes the Poison Rana and sent Bandido to the outside floor. Bandido returns to the ring, and later lands a 21 Plex on Strickland, but was met with keyfabe neck pain that prevented a successful pinfall attempt. At the end of the match, Bandido landed a hurricanrana, and set himself up for the 21 Plex. Strickland countered and landed a Vertebreaker to successfully pin Bandido and advance to the semifinals of the tournament.

The seventh match was a four-way match which saw Thekla defend the AEW Women's World Championship against Kris Statlander, Jamie Hayter, and Hikaru Shida. The match begins with the three challengers attacking Thekla, and later attacking each other after Thekla was laid down outside the ring. Statlander and Shida briefly aligned and attacked Hayter, and after Hayter took down the two, Thekla recovered and attacked Hayter. For some time, Hayter and Statlander fought in the ring alone, and Thekla recovered for a double bodyslam attempt from the top rope. The two caught her, only for Shida to dropkick all three. A number of roll-up pinfall attempts took place, and all later exit the ring. Thekla climbs to the top rope and successfully takes down all three with a crossbody to the floor. Later on, Thekla and Statlander return to the ring, with Thekla forcefully opening Statlander's jaw in a submission attempt. Statlander countered and bit Thekla's fingers. Later on, all four enter the ring, with Statlander landing a discus lariat, Thekla landing a spear, Hayter landing a head-butt, and Statlander and Shida backdrop suplexing Thekla and Hayter respectively, putting all four temporarily down. Statlander and Hayter get the upperhand and fight each other, which the two go down after a double crossbody. At the near end of the match, Hayter lands a Hayterade on Thekla, and attempted a pinfall before it was stopped by Shida. Shida lands a Falcon Arrow on Hayter, and attempts to submit before Statlander stopped her. Statlander takes down Shida and fights Thekla in the ring, landing a Sunday Night Fever, and attempting the pinfall before it was interrupted by Shida, who used a kendo stick. Hayter grabs the kendo stick, and Shida attacks her outside the ring, both eventually going down. The match ends with Thekla performing a stomp to Statlander's face for a pinfall victory, retaining her championship.

The penultimate match was a 7-on-7 Stadium Stampede match, which saw The Demand (Ricochet, Bishop Kaun, and Toa Liona), The Don Callis Family (Mark Davis and Andrade El Idolo), and The Dogs (David Finlay and Clark Connors) face Jericho, The Hurt Syndicate (Bobby Lashley and Shelton Benjamin) and The Elite (Kenny Omega, Matt Jackson, Nick Jackson, and Jack Perry). All 14 participants began the match fighting in the ring with Jericho's team taking the upper hand, all attacking Ricochet at the corner of the ring, and throwing Ricochet to his team outside the ring. Later, Davis performs a piledriver on Benjamin through a chair, and Liona holds onto The Young Bucks and Perry in his shoulders before performing a Samoan Drop on all three. Ricochet's team held onto Liona to make his abdominal stretch submission on Omega more effective, but it was stopped by MVP. The Young Bucks and Omega perform the tope suicida, with Benjamin and Jericho following up with a dive of their own. Afterward, five hurricanrana's were successfully executed in favor of Jericho's team. Ricochet's team fights back, but were all put in a Walls of Jericho submission. The submissions were interrupted after Perry hit Davis with a vacuum cleaner tank. Backstage, The Hurt Syndicate and Gates of Agony fight in the medical area. Lio Rush appears and fights Liona by biting his hand and putting him in a chokehold. In the back of the arena, The Young Bucks fight The Dogs on the merch stand and escalator. El Idolo was taking photos with fans, which was interrupted by Luchasaurus. In the ring, Jericho poured a bag filled with tennis balls, with both of them slamming onto the balls respectively. Backstage in the catering area saw Perry and Davis fighting, followed by Omega shoving El Idolo to Satnam Singh. El Idolo faces Singh, and a food fight broke out in the room. On the entrance ramp, The Young Bucks and Connors fought, with Matt Jackson putting Connors in a shopping cart and a trash can, and Nick Jackson superkicking Connors while inside a trash can. Backstage, Ricochet and Jericho were fighting, with Ricochet using a tennis racket, and upon opening a door, Jericho was greeted by Luther the Butler, who handed Jericho a larger tennis racket to attack Ricochet and later used a tennis ball machine, before slamming Ricochet to garage steel doors for an unsuccessful pinfall attempt. Outside the arena, Davis was almost run over by Perry using his bus, but managed to escape and arrived to the ringside. At the end of the match, Ricochet's team was slammed onto tables by Jericho's team. Ricochet was put in the ring, but was saved by Kaun, who would be superkicked by all seven members of Jericho's team, and ended with Jericho landing a Lionsault for a pinfall victory.

=== Main event ===
The main event match saw Darby Allin defend the AEW World Championship against MJF in a Title vs Hair match, where if MJF lost, he would have to shave his head bald. During MJF's introduction, he provoked ring announcer Justin Roberts to insult the audience. The match began with Allin performing a side headlock to attempt an early pinfall victory, but MJF kicks out. MJF is outside the ring, and Darby attempts the suicide dive on MJF but misses, causing Allin to hit hard on the ground and the announce desk. MJF laughed at the fail and insulted Allin. Later in the match, Allin sets up for a coffin drop, but MJF leaves the ring. Allin performs a successful suicide dive, launching MJF over the announce desk. Afterwards, Allin attempts a coffin drop on the apron, but MJF moves out the way. MJF sets up steel stairs by positioning it on its side, allowing MJF to land a package piledriver on Allin. Entering the ring, Allin pushed MJF to the referee, distracting the referee and low-blowing MJF, followed by an unsuccessful pinfall attempt. Later in the match, Allin puts MJF in a Scorpion Death Drop, which MJF broke by grabbing the rope. Allin immediately attempted a coffin drop which MJF responded by raising his knees. Darby performed a Code Red on MJF, but failed to pin him. The two get back up, and Allin attempted a suicide dive onto MJF outside the ring. Allin accidentally hits the cameraman after MJF grabbed him into position. Afterward, MJF carries Allin to the entrance stage where a barber chair, table and a hair clipper is placed in-case MJF lost the match. Allin locks MJF in a front guillotine and briefly passes him out. Allin then puts MJF on the table, climbed on top of the front stage, and used Mick Foley's "Bang Bang!" catchphrase before coffin dropping onto MJF. The coffin drop caused the back of Allin's head to bleed after accidentally hitting himself with the hair clipper. Allin drags MJF to the ring, performs a coffin drop, but MJF kicks out of the pinfall attempt. Allin performs another Scorpion Death Lock, but lost consciousness mid-way through. Allin performs a Scorpion Death Drop, but MJF takes down Allin with an avalanche piledriver from the second rope. MJF side headlocks and defeats Allin via pinfall to become a three-time AEW World Champion.

Following the main event, Kevin Knight appeared and attempted to attack MJF. However, Knight locked his eyes on Darby Allin who was strapped to a stretcher, and performed a UFO splash onto Allin, turning heel for the first time in his career. MJF witnessed the splash and was shocked, but later smiled and applauded.

== Aftermath ==
On the Dynamite after Double or Nothing on May 27, Kevin Knight entered the ring and explained why he attacked Darby Allin. His JetSpeed partner Mike Bailey enters the ring and demands Knight to apologize for what he did at Double or Nothing. Knight then attacks Bailey with a urigani, ending JetSpeed as a tag team. Later in the show, Knight encountered MJF, who thanked Knight, but assured to MJF that he will be hunting for the AEW World Championship.

Following Stadium Stampede, Jericho and Ricochet rematched for their third singles match together, where Jericho picked up his first win over Ricochet.

MJF celebrated his victory in the ring, only to be interrupted by Mark Briscoe. Briscoe demanded a world title match, which MJF refused because of his appearance. MJF, upon leaving, was interrupted by Rush, telling him that he isn't a fighting champion. MJF agreed to have a match with him on next week's episode of Dynamite, where he defeated Rush, but suffered a legitimate injury to his knee.

Cage and Cope celebrated their tag team victory in the ring by handing out disposable cameras to the fans as they prepare for a five second pose in the ring, which was interrupted by The Dogs (David Finlay and Clark Connors) who attacked the tag team champions.

On the Collision after Double or Nothing, Don Callis announced that Kyle Fletcher has been cleared to compete, and set his sights on the International Championship title. Takeshita agreed to face Kyle Fletcher in the future.

== Reception ==
Double or Nothing has received positive reviews from critics. Chris Mueller of Bleacher Report graded the event an A−, and considered it "successful" and praised the match variants. He also rewarded Kazuchika Okada vs Konosuke Takeshita as the events best bell-to-bell performance, the story of Takeshita leaving the Don Callis Family, and praised Kevin Knight's heel turn as "unexpected". Writing for TJR Wrestling, John Canton graded the event an 8.25 out of 10, praising its entertainment value, the matches, Kevin Knight's heel turn on Darby Allin, but criticized that the event could have been 30 minutes shorter. Dave Meltzer of the Wrestling Observer Newsletter also praised the event, rewarding seven out of the nine matches in the main show at least four stars. Of the seven matches, Cage and Cope vs. FTR and Konosuke Takeshita vs. Kazuchika Okada were rewarded five stars. Writing for 411Mania, Thomas Hall also praised the event as "pretty outstanding". Hall deemed that many of the matches can be picked "match of the night", and graded the event a 9.5 out of 10. Also writing for 411Mania, Theo Sambus also graded Double or Nothing a 9.5 out of 10, calling it a "phenomenal PPV" and also rewarded Kazuchika Okada vs Konosuke Takeshita's International Championship title match five stars and "match of the year contender (MOTYC)".

== Results ==
No.	Results	Stipulations	Times
1^{P}	Divine Dominion (Megan Bayne and Lena Kross) (c) defeated Zayda Steel and Viva Van (with Christopher Daniels) by pinfall	Five-minute tag team championship eliminator match Had Steel and Van lasted the full five minutes, they would have earned a future AEW Women's World Tag Team Championship match.	4:46
2^{P}	Death Riders (Claudio Castagnoli, Wheeler Yuta, and Daniel Garcia) (with Marina Shafir) defeated The Opps (Hook, Anthony Bowens, and Katsuyori Shibata) by pinfall	Trios match	10:35
3^{P}	Boom & Doom ("Big Boom!" A.J. and Q. T. Marshall) and The Conglomeration (Mark Briscoe, Orange Cassidy, and Roderick Strong) (with Big Justice, Harley Cameron, and The Rizzler) defeated Shane Taylor Promotions (Shane Taylor, Lee Moriarty, Anthony Ogogo, Carlie Bravo, and Capt. Shawn Dean) (with Christyan XO) by pinfall	10-man tag team match	6:30
4	Cope and Cage (Adam Copeland and Christian Cage) defeated FTR (Dax Harwood and Cash Wheeler) (c) (with Stokely)	New York Street Fight "I Quit" match for the AEW World Tag Team Championship; Had Cage and Cope lost, they would have disbanded as a tag team forever.	19:35
5	Konosuke Takeshita defeated Kazuchika Okada (c) by pinfall	Singles match for the AEW International Championship	19:00
6	Athena defeated Mina Shirakawa by pinfall	Women's Owen Hart Cup Quarterfinal	11:00
7	Jon Moxley (c) defeated Kyle O'Reilly by submission	No time limit match for the AEW Continental Championship	18:45
8	Will Ospreay defeated Samoa Joe by pinfall	Men's Owen Hart Cup Quarterfinal	13:55
9	Swerve Strickland (with Prince Nana) defeated Bandido by pinfall	Men's Owen Hart Cup Quarterfinal	15:20
10	Thekla (c) defeated Hikaru Shida, Jamie Hayter, and Kris Statlander by pinfall	Four-way match for the AEW Women's World Championship	14:00
11	Jericho, The Hurt Syndicate (Bobby Lashley and Shelton Benjamin), and The Elite (Kenny Omega, Jack Perry, Matt Jackson and Nick Jackson) (with MVP) defeated The Demand (Ricochet, Bishop Kaun and Toa Liona), The Don Callis Family (Mark Davis and Andrade El Ídolo), and The Dogs (David Finlay and Clark Connors) by pinfall	Stadium Stampede match	31:15
12	MJF defeated Darby Allin (c) by pinfall	Title vs. Hair match for the AEW World Championship	23:10
(c) / – the champion(s) heading into the match; P / – the match was broadcast on the pre-show
