= Grand Slam France =

2026 All Elite Wrestling two-part television special

- Promotional poster
- Promotion: All Elite Wrestling
- Date: October 6, 2026 (aired October 6 and 10, 2026)
- City: Paris, France
- Venue: Adidas Arena
- Attendance: 6,482

Grand Slam chronology
← Previous; Mexico	Next → —

All Elite Wrestling special events chronology
← Previous; A Tribute to Pac	Next → —

AEW Dynamite special episodes chronology
← Previous; A Tribute to Pac	Next → Fright Night

AEW Collision special episodes chronology
← Previous; A Tribute to "The Butcher" Andy Williams	Next → Fright Night

Grand Slam France was a two-part professional wrestling television special produced by All Elite Wrestling (AEW). The event took place on Tuesday, October 6, 2026 at the Adidas Arena in Paris, France, encompassing the broadcasts of Wednesday Night Dynamite and Saturday Night Collision. Dynamite was taped and aired later that same night on tape delay on TBS in the United States, while Collision was also taped and aired on tape delay on October 10 on TNT, also in the United States. Both shows were also simulcast on the streaming service HBO Max. This was also the first AEW event to take place in France.

== Production ==
=== Background ===
Grand Slam is an annual professional wrestling television special produced by the American promotion All Elite Wrestling (AEW) since 2021. From its inception until 2024, the event was held in late September at the Arthur Ashe Stadium in the New York City borough of Queens. It also originally aired as a two-part special—from 2021 to 2023, it encompassed the broadcasts of Wednesday Night Dynamite and Friday Night Rampage, while in 2024, it aired as Dynamite and Saturday Night Collision. AEW then held Grand Slam Australia in February 2025, which was the company's first event in Australia and aired as a standalone special.

On April 16, 2025, AEW held a second Grand Slam event for the year to be held on June 18 at Arena México in Mexico City, Mexico, marking the company's first televised event in Mexico. Grand Slam Mexico was held in partnership with the Mexican promotion Consejo Mundial de Lucha Libre (CMLL), the owners and primary operators of Arena México. It aired live as a special episode of Dynamite, simulcast on TBS and the streaming service Max in the United States.

On August 24, 2026, AEW announced that they would be holding their first event in France beginning with Grand Slam France on October 6, 2026 at the Adidas Arena in Paris.

=== Storylines ===
Grand Slam France featured professional wrestling matches that involved different wrestlers from pre-existing feuds and storylines. Storylines were produced on AEW's weekly television programs, Dynamite and Collision.

== Results ==
Dynamite (aired October 6)
No.	Results	Stipulations	Times
1	Bandido (with Brody King) (c) defeated Kofi (with Austin Creed) by pinfall	Singles match for the ROH World Championship	14:20
2	Samoa Joe defeated Jack Perry by pinfall	Singles match The winner qualified for the Clockwork Carnage match at WrestleDream.	10:45
3	Davis and Doyle (Mark Davis and Jake Doyle) defeated Death Riders (Jon Moxley and Gabe Kidd) (with Marina Shafir) by pinfall	Tag team match	10:50
4	Darby Allin (c) defeated Kyle Fletcher by pinfall	Singles match for the AEW TNT Championship	15:45
5	Mercedes Moné (c) defeated Queen Aminata by pinfall	Singles match for the AEW Women's World Championship	11:10
6	Will Ospreay (c) defeated Kazuchika Okada (with Don Callis) by pinfall	Singles match for the AEW World Championship	18:20
(c) / – the champion(s) heading into the match

Collision (aired October 10)
No.	Results	Stipulations	Times
1	Death Riders (Claudio Castagnoli, Daniel Garcia, Wheeler Yuta, and Marina Shafir) (with Gabe Kidd and Jon Moxley) defeated The Conglomeration (Orange Cassidy, Kyle O'Reilly, Roderick Strong, and Willow Nightingale) by pinfall	Eight-person mixed tornado tag team match	14:36
2	Nick Wayne defeated Jericho by pinfall	Singles match	12:30
3	Mike Bailey defeated Lee Moriarty by pinfall	Singles match The winner qualified for the Clockwork Carnage match at WrestleDream.	8:56
4	Swerve Strickland (with Austin Creed, Kofi, and Prince Nana) defeated Carlie Bravo (with Capt. Shawn Dean, Shane Taylor, and Trish Adora) by pinfall	Singles match	6:40
5	Andrade El Ídolo (c) defeated Michael Oku (with Amira Blair) by pinfall	Singles match for the AEW National Championship	8:18
6	Wrathlander (Harley Cameron and Kris Statlander) defeated Divine Dominion (Lena Kross and Megan Bayne) and Sisters of Sin (Julia Hart and Skye Blue) by pinfall	Three-way tag team match to determine the #1 contenders to the AEW Women's World Tag Team Championship at WrestleDream	7:34
7	The Young Bucks (Matt Jackson and Nick Jackson) (c) defeated The Dogs (David Finlay and Clark Connors)	Tag team match for the AEW World Tag Team Championship	13:30
(c) / – the champion(s) heading into the match
