= Grand Slam Australia (2026) =

All Elite Wrestling television special

- Promotional poster featuring various AEW wrestlers
- Promotion: All Elite Wrestling
- Date: February 14, 2026
- City: Sydney, Australia
- Venue: Qudos Bank Arena
- Attendance: 7,029

Grand Slam chronology
← Previous; Mexico (2025)	Next → Mexico (2026)

AEW in Australia chronology
← Previous; Global Wars Australia	Next → —

Grand Slam Australia chronology
← Previous; 2025	Next → —

The 2026 Grand Slam Australia was a professional wrestling television special produced by the American promotion All Elite Wrestling (AEW). It was the seventh Grand Slam event and the second annual Grand Slam Australia. The event took place on Saturday, February 14, 2026, at Qudos Bank Arena in Sydney, Australia. The special was simulcast on TNT and Max in the United States, airing on tape delay later that same day in place of AEW's regular Saturday night program, Collision. (Note: The event was taped at 6:00 p.m. Australian Eastern Standard Time, which is 3:00 a.m. Eastern Time (ET) in the United States. Due to this time difference, the event aired later that same day at 8:00 pm. ET in the US, the same timeslot as when Collision airs.)

Six matches were contested at the event. In the main event, MJF defeated Brody King to retain the AEW World Championship. In other prominent matches, Kyle Fletcher defeated Mark Briscoe in a Ladder match to retain the AEW TNT Championship, "Timeless" Toni Storm and Orange Cassidy defeated Death Riders (Wheeler Yuta and Marina Shafir) in a Hair vs. Hair mixed tag team match, resulting in Yuta's hair being shaved off since he was pinned, and Jon Moxley vs. Konosuke Takeshita for the AEW Continental Championship ended in a time limit draw. The event also featured the official AEW debut of Lena Kross as a contracted wrestler.

== Production ==
=== Background ===
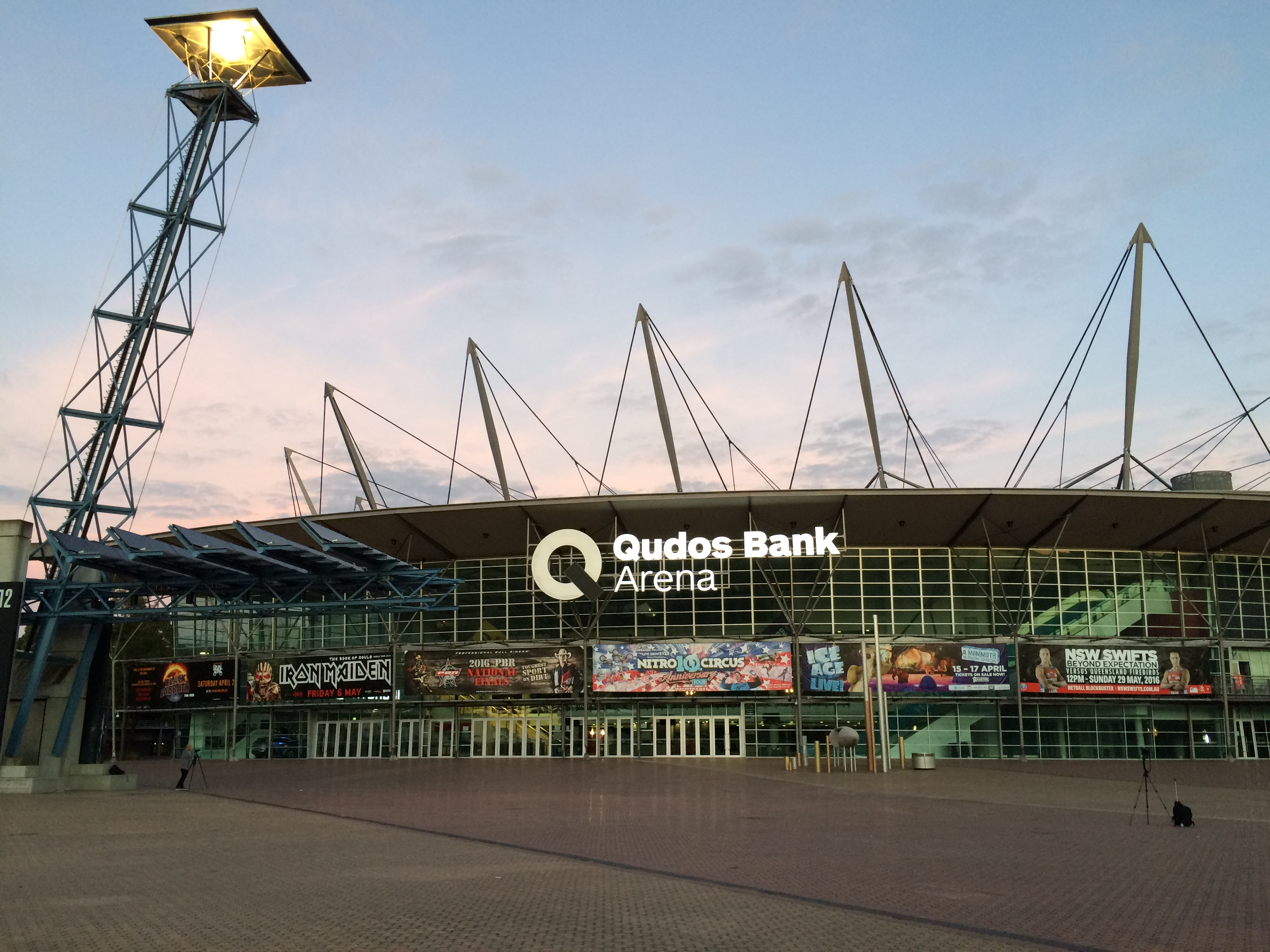
The event was held at the Qudos Bank Arena in Sydney, New South Wales, Australia.

Grand Slam is an annual professional wrestling television special produced by the American promotion All Elite Wrestling (AEW) since 2021. After holding two Grand Slam specials in 2025, first in February in Australia and then in June in Mexico, on August 24, 2025, at Forbidden Door, AEW announced that they would return to Australia for the seventh Grand Slam event, scheduled for Saturday, February 14, 2026, at the Qudos Bank Arena in Sydney, Australia, with the event also promoted as Grand Slam Sydney. This was AEW's second Grand Slam held in the country, after the February 2025 event. AEW also announced House Rules: Brisbane, a house show taking place the following day on February 15, 2026, at the Brisbane Entertainment Centre in Brisbane, Queensland, the same venue that hosted the February 2025 special. Tickets for the 2026 Grand Slam Australia went on sale on September 1.

=== Storylines ===
Grand Slam Australia featured professional wrestling matches that involved different wrestlers from pre-existing feuds and storylines. Storylines were produced on AEW's weekly television programs, Dynamite and Collision.

After MJF successfully defended his the AEW World Championship against Bandido at Dynamite: Maximum Carnage, he launched a post-match assault on Bandido. Brody King charged the ring to save his partner, forcing MJF to flee. On the January 21 episode of Dynamite, King confronted MJF, demanding a title shot. MJF dismissed him, claiming King was "all bark and no bite" and needed to beat "elite level talent" before earning a shot at the title. On the January 28 epsisode, King revealed he had met with Tony Khan to bypass MJF's stalling. They agreed on a World Title Eliminator Match the following week, where a victory for King would guarantee a title shot at Grand Slam Australia. King defeated MJF following a distraction from "Hangman" Adam Page.

During the 2025 Continental Classic, Konosuke Takeshita defeated Jon Moxley in a league match; Moxley ended up winning the overall tournament at Worlds End in December 2025 to win the AEW Continental Championship. On the January 31 episode of Collision, Moxley publicly addressed the loss stating that Takeshita's victory motivated him. He then laid out a challenge to Takeshita for Grand Slam Australia with his Continental Championship on the line.

== Results ==
No.	Results	Stipulations	Times
1	Jon Moxley (c) vs. Konosuke Takeshita ended in a time limit draw	Singles match for the AEW Continental Championship	20:00
2	The Babes of Wrath (Harley Cameron and Willow Nightingale) (c) defeated MegaBad (Megan Bayne and Penelope Ford) by pinfall	Tag team match for the AEW Women's World Tag Team Championship	11:04
3	"Hangman" Adam Page defeated Andrade El Ídolo (with Don Callis) by pinfall	Singles match The winner received an AEW World Championship match at Revolution	16:29
4	Orange Cassidy and "Timeless" Toni Storm defeated Death Riders (Wheeler Yuta and Marina Shafir) by pinfall	Mixed tornado tag team hair vs. hair match Since Yuta got pinned, he was the one who had his hair shaved.	11:27
5	Kyle Fletcher (c) defeated Mark Briscoe	Ladder match for the AEW TNT Championship	16:02
6	MJF (c) defeated Brody King by pinfall	Singles match for the AEW World Championship	21:37
(c) / – the champion(s) heading into the match
