= Grand Slam Mexico (2026) =

All Elite Wrestling and Consejo Mundial de Lucha Libre television special

- Promotional poster featuring various AEW wrestlers
- Promotion(s): All Elite Wrestling; Consejo Mundial de Lucha Libre
- Date: August 5, 2026
- City: Mexico City, Mexico
- Venue: Arena México
- Attendance: 13,200

Grand Slam chronology
← Previous; Australia	Next → France

AEW Dynamite special episodes chronology
← Previous; Beach Break	Next → Rebel Heart

The 2026 Grand Slam Mexico was a professional wrestling television special produced by the American company All Elite Wrestling (AEW) in partnership with the Mexican promotion Consejo Mundial de Lucha Libre (CMLL). It was the eighth Grand Slam event and the second annual Grand Slam Mexico. The event took place on August 5, 2026 at Arena México in Mexico City, Mexico and aired live as a special episode of Wednesday Night Dynamite, simulcast on TBS and HBO Max in the United States and Fox Sports Mexico in Mexico.

== Production ==
Other on-screen personnel
Role:	Name:
Commentators	Tony Schiavone (English)
Commentators	Nigel McGuinness (English)
Commentators	Excalibur (English)
Commentators	Carlos Cabrera (Spanish)
Commentators	Jimena Sánchez (Spanish)
Ring announcer	Justin Roberts

=== Background ===
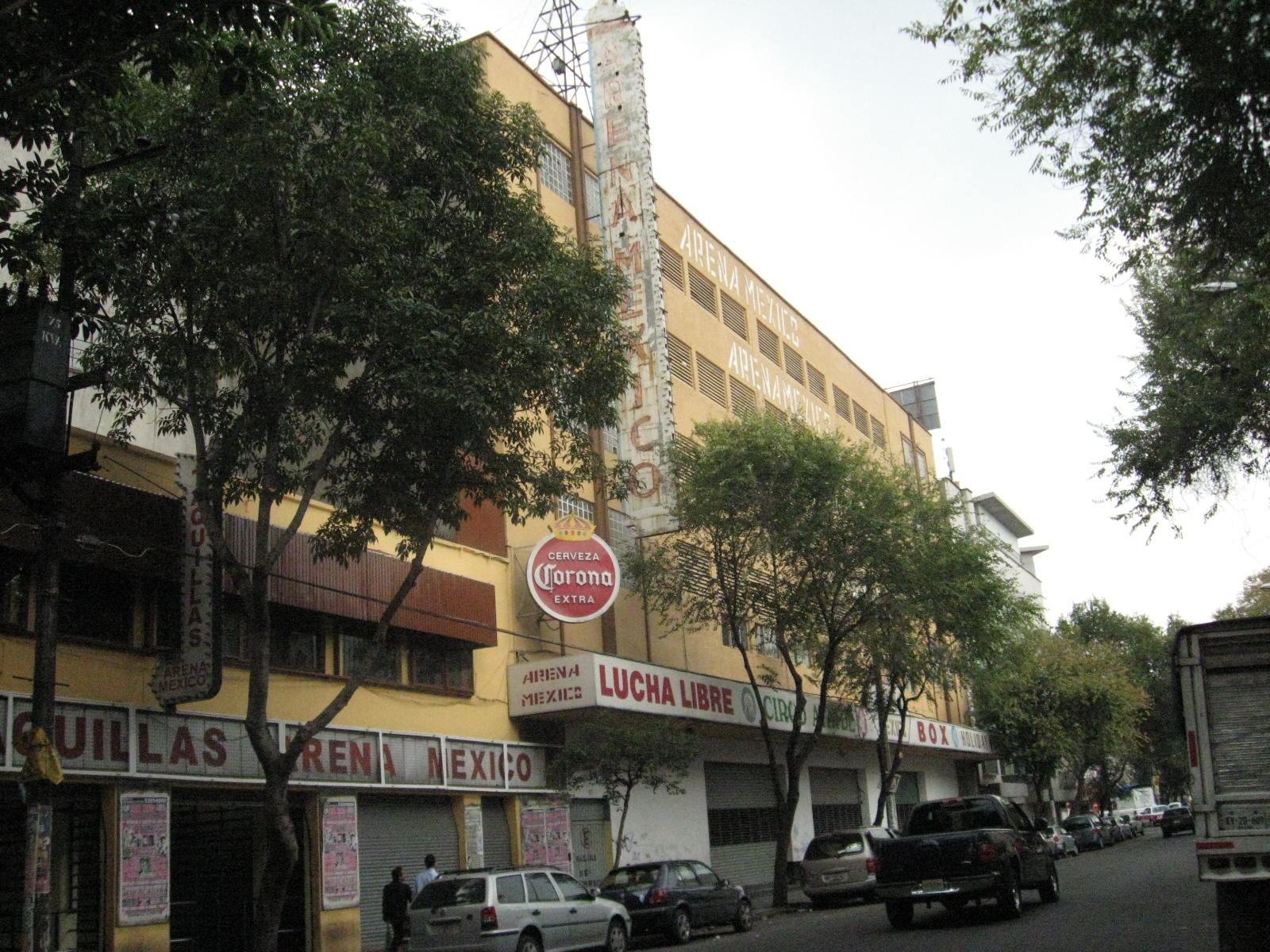
Grand Slam Mexico took place at the historic Arena México in Mexico City, Mexico, which is owned and operated by All Elite Wrestling's Mexican partner promotion and co-producers of the event, Consejo Mundial de Lucha Libre.

Grand Slam is a professional wrestling television special produced by the American promotion All Elite Wrestling (AEW) since 2021. From its inception until 2024, the event was held annually in late September at the Arthur Ashe Stadium in the New York City borough of Queens. It also originally aired as a two-part special—from 2021 to 2023, it encompassed the broadcasts of Wednesday Night Dynamite and Friday Night Rampage, while in 2024, it aired as Dynamite and Saturday Night Collision. AEW then held Grand Slam Australia in February 2025, which was the company's first event in Australia and aired as a standalone special.

On April 16, 2025, AEW scheduled a second Grand Slam event for the year to be held on June 18 at Arena México in Mexico City, Mexico, marking the company's first televised event in Mexico. Grand Slam Mexico was held in partnership with the Mexican promotion Consejo Mundial de Lucha Libre (CMLL), the owners and primary operators of Arena México. It aired live as a special episode of Dynamite, simulcast on TBS and the streaming service Max in the United States, and Fox Sports Mexico in Mexico. Tickets went on sale on April 26 and sold out within 48 hours. Grand Slam Mexico had a special runtime of 2.5 hours instead of Dynamite's regular two hours.

On April 16, 2026, it was reported in the Wrestling Observer Newsletter that AEW was expected to be returning to Mexico City in the second half of 2026. On June 2, 2026, AEW announced that they would be returning to Arena Mexico for a second Grand Slam Mexico special on August 5, 2026.

=== Storylines ===
Grand Slam Mexico featured professional wrestling matches that involved different wrestlers from pre-existing scripted feuds and storylines. Storylines were produced on AEW's weekly television programs, Dynamite and Collision, as well as CMLL's weekly Friday night show Super Viernes and other CMLL events.

== Results ==
No.	Results	Stipulations	Times
1	Death Riders (Jon Moxley, Wheeler Yuta, Pac, and Daniel Garcia) (with Marina Shafir) defeated Cage and Cope (Christian Cage and Adam Copeland) and The Young Bucks (Matt Jackson and Nick Jackson) by pinfall	Eight-man tag team match	11:20
2	Andrade El Ídolo defeated Tommaso Ciampa and Komander by pinfall	Three-way match to determine the #1 spot in the Casino Gauntlet match at All In	11:05
3	Willow Nightingale and The Brawling Birds (Alex Windsor and Jamie Hayter) defeated Mercedes Moné and Divine Dominion (Megan Bayne and Lena Kross) by pinfall	Trios match	11:25
4	Kyle Fletcher (c) (with Don Callis) defeated "Speedball" Mike Bailey by pinfall	Singles match for the AEW International Championship	16:40
5	Místico, Jericho, and Darby Allin defeated The Don Callis Family (Kazuchika Okada, Kevin Knight, and Hechicero) by pinfall	Trios match	10:30
6	Persephone defeated Kris Statlander by pinfall	Singles match	9:05
7	"Hangman" Adam Page and Brodido (Brody King and Bandido) (with KeMalito) defeated The Demand (Ricochet, Bishop Kaun, and Toa Liona) (c) by pinfall	Trios match for the AEW World Trios Championship	13:35
8	Will Ospreay defeated Mark Davis by pinfall	Mexico City Street Fight; No outside interference was allowed.	18:00
(c) / – the champion(s) heading into the match
