= AEW Grand Slam (2022) =

All Elite Wrestling two-part television special

Coordinates: 40.750°N 73.847°W

- Promotional poster for the Dynamite broadcast featuring various AEW wrestlers
- Promotion: All Elite Wrestling
- Date: September 21, 2022 (aired September 21 and 23, 2022)
- City: Flushing, Queens, New York
- Venue: Arthur Ashe Stadium
- Attendance: 13,800

Grand Slam chronology
← Previous; 2021	Next → 2023

AEW Dynamite special episodes chronology
← Previous; Quake by the Lake	Next → Title Tuesday

AEW Rampage special episodes chronology
← Previous; Quake by the Lake	Next → Holiday Bash

The 2022 Grand Slam was a two-part professional wrestling television special produced by All Elite Wrestling (AEW). It was the second annual Grand Slam event and took place on September 21, 2022, at the Arthur Ashe Stadium in the Queens borough of New York City, encompassing the broadcasts of Wednesday Night Dynamite and Friday Night Rampage. Dynamite aired live on TBS while Rampage aired on tape delay on September 23 on TNT and was expanded to two hours for the Grand Slam special.

The card comprised a total of thirteen matches, five of which aired live on Dynamite while the other eight were taped for Rampage. In the main event of the Dynamite broadcast, Jon Moxley defeated Bryan Danielson in a tournament final to win the vacant AEW World Championship. Other prominent matches saw The Acclaimed (Anthony Bowens and Max Caster) defeat Swerve In Our Glory (Keith Lee and Swerve Strickland) to win the AEW World Tag Team Championship, and in the opening bout, Chris Jericho defeated Claudio Castagnoli to win the ROH World Championship and his eighth overall world championship. In the main event of the Rampage broadcast, Ricky Starks defeated Powerhouse Hobbs in a Lights Out match. In other prominent matches, "Hangman" Adam Page won the Golden Ticket Battle Royale to earn a future AEW World Championship match, Action Bronson and Hook defeated Jericho Appreciation Society (Matt Menard and Angelo Parker), and in the opening bout, Sting and Darby Allin defeated House of Black (Buddy Matthews and Brody King) in a No Disqualification tag team match.

The Dynamite broadcast was also notable for the debut of Saraya, previously known as Paige in WWE, who last wrestled in 2017. The Rampage broadcast was also notable for an appearance by Japanese wrestling veteran The Great Muta, who came to the aid of old rival Sting.

== Production ==
=== Background ===
Other on-screen personnel
Role	Name
Commentators	Excalibur (Dynamite and Rampage
Commentators	Tony Schiavone (Dynamite and Rampage)
Commentators	Taz (Dynamite)
Commentators	Ian Riccaboni (Castagnoli vs. Jericho)
Commentators	William Regal (Castagnoli vs. Jericho)
Commentators	Jim Ross (Rampage)
Commentators	Chris Jericho (Rampage)
Commentators	Paul Wight (Rampage)
Ring announcer	Justin Roberts
Referees	Aubrey Edwards
Referees	Bryce Remsburg
Referees	Paul Turner
Referees	Rick Knox

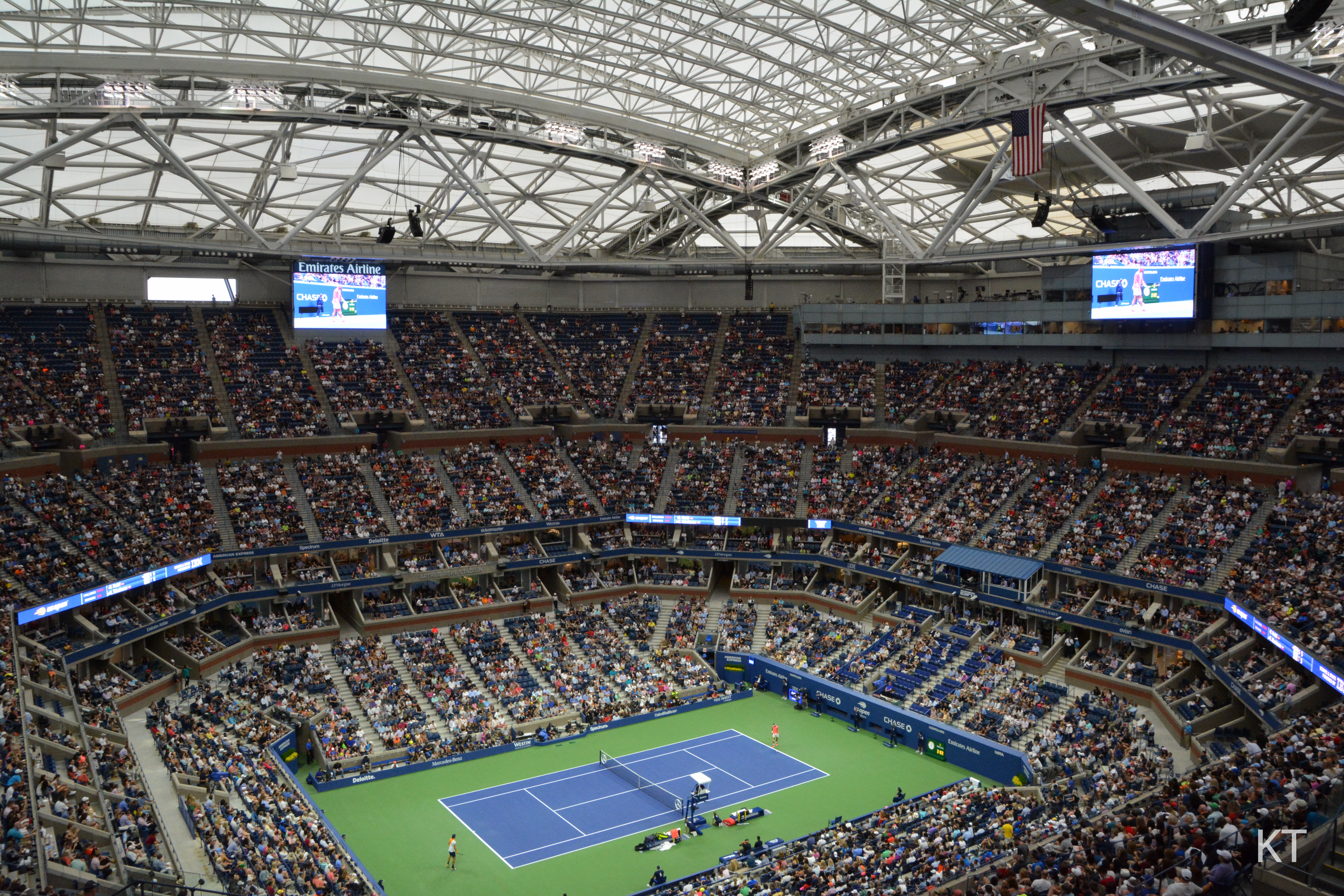
The event was held at the Arthur Ashe Stadium in the Queens borough of New York City.

In September 2021, All Elite Wrestling (AEW) held a two-part television special called Grand Slam, which aired as special episodes of AEW's weekly television programs, Wednesday Night Dynamite and Friday Night Rampage. The event was held in the New York City borough of Queens at the Arthur Ashe Stadium, the main stadium of tennis' US Open, and marked AEW's first event held in New York City, which is primarily known as home territory for WWE, as well as the company's first full event to be held in a stadium.

On May 11, 2022, AEW president Tony Khan confirmed that Grand Slam would return to the Arthur Ashe Stadium later that year and the event would continue forward as an annual event at the same venue. During the Forbidden Door pay-per-view on June 26, the 2022 Grand Slam's date was confirmed for September 21, with Dynamite airing live that night on TBS and Rampage airing on tape delay on September 23 on TNT. Like the previous year, Rampage was expanded to two hours for the Grand Slam special.

=== Storylines ===
Grand Slam featured professional wrestling matches that involved different wrestlers from pre-existing scripted feuds and storylines. Wrestlers portrayed heroes, villains, or less distinguishable characters in scripted events that built tension and culminated in a wrestling match or series of matches. Storylines were produced on AEW's weekly television programs, Dynamite and Rampage, and the supplementary online streaming shows, Dark and Elevation.

After CM Punk won the AEW World Championship at All Out, Punk got suspended due to a legitimate backstage physical altercation following the event's media scrum. On the following episode of Dynamite, AEW president Tony Khan announced that the AEW World Championship was vacated. A tournament then began that episode to crown a new champion, with the final taking place at Dynamite: Grand Slam.

At All Out, Swerve In Our Glory (Keith Lee and Swerve Strickland) defeated The Acclaimed (Max Caster and Anthony Bowens) to retain the AEW World Tag Team Championship. A championship rematch was then subsequently scheduled for Dynamite: Grand Slam.

On the September 14 episode of Dynamite, after Dr. Britt Baker, D.M.D. and Serena Deeb defeated interim AEW Women's World Champion Toni Storm and Athena, it was later announced that Storm was scheduled to defend the title in a four-way match against Deeb, Athena, and Baker at Dynamite: Grand Slam.

During the All Out Zero Hour pre-show, AEW All-Atlantic Champion Pac, who had just retained the title, was interrupted by long-time rival Orange Cassidy, who seemingly challenged him to a title match, which Pac immediately declined. After weeks of confrontations between the two, the championship match was scheduled for Dynamite: Grand Slam.

Citing the seven world championships he had won, Chris Jericho confronted ROH World Champion Claudio Castagnoli on the September 16 episode of Rampage and challenged him to a match for the championship, as he had never won the ROH World Championship. Castagnoli accepted and the match was scheduled for Dynamite: Grand Slam.

After Hook defeated Angelo Parker to retain the FTW Championship during the All Out Zero Hour pre-show, Parker's tag team partner, Matt Menard, ambushed Hook until rapper Action Bronson, who wrote Hook's theme song, made the save and took out Menard and Parker. On the September 14 episode of Dynamite, a match pitting Bronson and Hook against Menard and Parker was announced for Rampage: Grand Slam.

Eddie Kingston and Sammy Guevara were originally scheduled to face each other at All Out, however, Kingston was quietly suspended by AEW after getting into a legitimate backstage verbal dispute with Guevara. After Kingston's suspension was lifted, a match between Kingston and Guevara was announced for Rampage: Grand Slam.

At the Fight for the Fallen special episode of Dynamite on July 27, after Ricky Starks lost the FTW Championship, his tag team partner Powerhouse Hobbs attacked him, thus disbanding Team Taz. A match between Starks and Hobbs was scheduled for All Out, which Hobbs won. A rematch between Starks and Hobbs was announced for Rampage: Grand Slam, and was later stipulated to be a Lights Out match.

== Results ==
Dynamite (aired live September 21)
No.	Results	Stipulations	Times
1	Chris Jericho defeated Claudio Castagnoli (c) by pinfall	Singles match for the ROH World Championship	14:25
2	The Acclaimed (Max Caster and Anthony Bowens) (with DJ Whoo Kid and Billy Gunn) defeated Swerve In Our Glory (Keith Lee and Swerve Strickland) (c) (with Fabolous) by pinfall	Tag team match for the AEW World Tag Team Championship	13:00
3	Pac (c) defeated Orange Cassidy by pinfall	Singles match for the AEW All-Atlantic Championship	13:00
4	Toni Storm (c) defeated Serena Deeb, Athena, and Dr. Britt Baker, D.M.D. (with Rebel) by pinfall	Four-way match for the interim AEW Women's World Championship	9:50
5	Jon Moxley defeated Bryan Danielson by technical submission	Tournament final for the vacant AEW World Championship	19:15
(c) / – the champion(s) heading into the match

Rampage (aired on tape delay September 23)
No.	Results	Stipulations	Times
1	Sting and Darby Allin defeated House of Black (Buddy Matthews and Brody King) (with Julia Hart) by pinfall	No Disqualification tag team match	13:00
2	Action Bronson and Hook defeated Jericho Appreciation Society (Matt Menard and Angelo Parker) by submission	Tag team match	5:07
3	WarJoe (Wardlow and Samoa Joe) defeated Tony Nese and Josh Woods (with Mark Sterling) by pinfall	Tag team match	2:20
4	"Jungle Boy" Jack Perry defeated Rey Fénix (with Alex Abrahantes) by pinfall	Singles match	17:48
5	Sammy Guevara (with Tay Melo) defeated Eddie Kingston by reverse decision	Singles match	7:58
6	Jade Cargill (c) (with The Baddies (Kiera Hogan and Leila Grey)) defeated Diamanté (with Trina) by pinfall	Singles match for the AEW TBS Championship	2:34
7	"Hangman" Adam Page won by last eliminating Rush	25-man Golden Ticket Battle Royale for a future AEW World Championship match (Note: Also in the match were Ari Daivari, Brian Cage, Chuck Taylor, Cole Karter, Dalton Castle, Danhausen, Daniel Garcia, Dante Martin, Evil Uno, Isiah Kassidy, Jake Hager, Jay Lethal, John Silver, Lance Archer, Lee Moriarty, Marq Quen, Matt Hardy, Penta El Zero M, Q. T. Marshall, Preston Vance, The Blade, The Butcher, and Trent Beretta.)	13:20
8	Ricky Starks defeated Powerhouse Hobbs by pinfall	Lights Out match	11:54
(c) / – the champion(s) heading into the match

=== AEW Grand Slam Tournament of Champions ===
Wild Card Round; Dynamite (September 7); Rampage (September 9)
"Hangman" Adam Page	23:04
Bryan Danielson	Pin
Sammy Guevara	Pin
Darby Allin	11:06

Semifinals; Dynamite (September 14)
Chris Jericho (Note: Chris Jericho and Jon Moxley both received a first round bye into the semifinals.)	19:49
Bryan Danielson	Sub
Sammy Guevara	13:46
Jon Moxley	Pin

Finals; Dynamite: Grand Slam (September 21)
Bryan Danielson	19:15
Jon Moxley	TKO

== See also ==
- 2022 in professional wrestling
- List of All Elite Wrestling special events
- List of AEW Dynamite special episodes
- List of AEW Rampage special episodes
