= AEW Grand Slam (2023) =

All Elite Wrestling two-part television special

Coordinates: 40.750°N 73.847°W

- Promotion: All Elite Wrestling
- Date: September 20, 2023 (aired September 20 and 22, 2023)
- City: Flushing, Queens, New York
- Venue: Arthur Ashe Stadium
- Attendance: 11,265

Grand Slam chronology
← Previous; 2022	Next → 2024

AEW Dynamite special episodes chronology
← Previous; Fyter Fest	Next → Title Tuesday

AEW Rampage special episodes chronology
← Previous; Fyter Fest	Next → Winter Is Coming

The 2023 Grand Slam was a two-part professional wrestling television special produced by All Elite Wrestling (AEW). It was the third annual Grand Slam event and took place on September 20, 2023, at the Arthur Ashe Stadium in the Queens borough of New York City, encompassing the broadcasts of Wednesday Night Dynamite and Friday Night Rampage. Dynamite aired live on TBS while Rampage aired on tape delay on September 22 on TNT and was expanded to two hours for the Grand Slam special. This would be the final Grand Slam in which the second part aired as Rampage as in 2024, the second part instead aired as Saturday Night Collision.

A total of 12 matches were held across the two episodes, with five broadcast live on Dynamite and seven taped for Rampage. In the main event of the Dynamite broadcast, MJF defeated Samoa Joe to retain the AEW World Championship. In the main event of the Rampage broadcast, The Elite (Matt Jackson, Nick Jackson, and "Hangman" Adam Page) defeated Mogul Embassy (Brian Cage, Bishop Kaun, and Toa Liona) to win the ROH World Six-Man Tag Team Championship.

== Production ==
=== Background ===
Grand Slam is an annual television special produced every September by the American professional wrestling promotion All Elite Wrestling (AEW) since 2021. The event is held at the Arthur Ashe Stadium in the New York City borough of Queens and airs as a two-part special, encompassing the broadcasts of Wednesday Night Dynamite and Friday Night Rampage. On the June 28, 2023, episode of Dynamite, it was announced that the third annual Grand Slam would be held on September 20, with Dynamite airing live that night on TBS and Rampage airing on tape delay on September 22 on TNT with Rampage expanded to two hours for the Grand Slam special.

=== Storylines ===
Grand Slam featured professional wrestling matches that involved different wrestlers from pre-existing scripted feuds and storylines. Wrestlers portrayed heroes, villains, or less distinguishable characters in scripted events that built tension and culminated in a wrestling match or series of matches. Storylines were produced on AEW's weekly television programs, Dynamite, Rampage, and Collision.

On the August 30 episode of Dynamite, it was revealed that there would be a tournament in which the winner would receive an AEW World Championship match against MJF at Dynamite: Grand Slam. The tournament was won by Samoa Joe.

On the September 6 episode of Dynamite, it was announced that on the next episode, a four-way match between Dr. Britt Baker, D.M.D., Hikaru Shida, Nyla Rose, and Toni Storm would take place to determine Saraya's challenger for the AEW Women's World Championship at Dynamite: Grand Slam. The match was won by Storm.

== Results ==
=== Night 1 ===
Dynamite (aired live September 20)
No.	Results	Stipulations	Times
1	Eddie Kingston (Strong) defeated Claudio Castagnoli (ROH) (with Wheeler Yuta) by pinfall	Winner Takes All match for the ROH World Championship and Strong Openweight Championship	15:15
2	Chris Jericho defeated Sammy Guevara by pinfall	Singles match	16:10
3	Rey Fenix (with Alex Abrahantes) defeated Jon Moxley (c) by pinfall	Singles match for the AEW International Championship	11:35
4	Saraya (c) (with Ruby Soho) defeated Toni Storm by pinfall	Singles match for the AEW Women's World Championship	8:30
5	MJF (c) defeated Samoa Joe by technical submission	Singles match for the AEW World Championship	18:40
(c) / – the champion(s) heading into the match

=== Night 2 ===
Rampage (taped September 20, aired September 22)
No.	Results	Stipulations	Times
1	Sting and Darby Allin (with Nick Wayne) defeated Christian Cage and Luchasaurus by pinfall	Tag team match	7:42
2	Hook, Kris Statlander, and Orange Cassidy defeated Angelo Parker, Anna Jay, and Matt Menard (with Jake Hager) by pinfall	Six-person mixed tag team match	9:24
3	The Righteous (Dutch and Vincent) defeated Best Friends (Chuck Taylor and Trent Beretta), The Kingdom (Matt Taven and Mike Bennett), and The Hardys (Matt Hardy and Jeff Hardy) by pinfall	Four-way tag team match for a ROH World Tag Team Championship match at WrestleDream	9:28
4	Billy Gunn and The Acclaimed (Max Caster and Anthony Bowens) (c) defeated The Dark Order (Alex Reynolds, Evil Uno, and John Silver) by pinfall	Six-man tag team match for the AEW World Trios Championship	10:38
5	Julia Hart (with Brody King) defeated Skye Blue by submission	Singles match	8:14
6	Mike Santana defeated Boulder by pinfall	Singles match	2:24
7	The Elite (Matt Jackson, Nick Jackson, and "Hangman" Adam Page) defeated Mogul Embassy (Brian Cage, Bishop Kaun, and Toa Liona) (c) (with Prince Nana) by pinfall	Six-man tag team match for the ROH World Six-Man Tag Team Championship	11:56
(c) / – the champion(s) heading into the match

=== Grand Slam World Championship Eliminator Tournament ===
Quarterfinals; Dynamite (September 6, 2023); Rampage (September 8, 2023)
Darby Allin	Sub
Nick Wayne	14:55
Trent Beretta	11:00
Roderick Strong	Pin
Penta El Zero Miedo	Pin
Jay Lethal	12:07
Samoa Joe	Pin
Jeff Hardy	8:31

Semifinals; Collision (September 9, 2023)
Darby Allin	14:45
Roderick Strong	Pin
Penta El Zero Miedo	15:00
Samoa Joe	Sub

Final; Dynamite (September 13, 2023)
Roderick Strong	11:00
Samoa Joe	Sub

== See also ==
- 2023 in professional wrestling
- List of All Elite Wrestling special events
- List of AEW Dynamite special episodes
- List of AEW Rampage special episodes
