= AEW Grand Slam (2024) =

All Elite Wrestling two-part television special

Coordinates: 40.750°N 73.847°W

- Promotional poster featuring various AEW wrestlers
- Promotion: All Elite Wrestling
- Date: September 25, 2024 (aired September 25 and 28, 2024)
- City: Flushing, Queens, New York City, New York
- Venue: Arthur Ashe Stadium
- Attendance: 8,834

Grand Slam chronology
← Previous; 2023	Next → Australia

AEW Dynamite special episodes chronology
← Previous; Blood & Guts	Next → Dynamite's 5 Year Anniversary

AEW Collision special episodes chronology
← Previous; Collision's 1 Year Anniversary	Next → Winter Is Coming

The 2024 Grand Slam was a two-part professional wrestling television special produced by All Elite Wrestling (AEW). It was the fourth annual Grand Slam event and took place on September 25, 2024, at the Arthur Ashe Stadium in the Queens borough of New York City, encompassing the broadcasts of Wednesday Night Dynamite and Saturday Night Collision. Dynamite aired live on TBS while Collision aired on tape delay on September 28 on TNT.

Thirteen matches were contested at the event, five of which aired live on Dynamite with the other eight taped for Collision. In the main event of the Dynamite broadcast, Jon Moxley defeated Darby Allin to become the number one contender for the AEW World Championship at WrestleDream. In the main event of Collision, Kazuchika Okada defeated Sammy Guevara in a Championship Eliminator match, barring Guevara from challenging Okada for the AEW Continental Championship for as long as Okada was champion. The Dynamite episode was also notable for the retirement of the FTW Championship and the AEW debut of MVP.

This year's event changed the format for Grand Slam as for the prior three events, the second part had aired as a special episode of Friday Night Rampage. It would subsequently be the final Grand Slam to air as a two-part television special and held at the Arthur Ashe Stadium in late September as beginning the following year, the event became an international attraction with multiple Grand Slam events held per year, starting with Grand Slam Australia in February 2025.

== Production ==
=== Background ===
Grand Slam is an annual professional wrestling event produced by the American promotion All Elite Wrestling (AEW) since 2021. From its inception, the event was held at the Arthur Ashe Stadium in the New York City borough of Queens in late September and originally aired as a two-part television special that encompassed the broadcasts of Wednesday Night Dynamite and Friday Night Rampage. On June 30, 2024, AEW announced that the fourth Grand Slam would be held on September 25. Unlike prior years, however, the 2024 event was announced to air as Dynamite on TBS and AEW's Saturday night program, Collision, which premiered in June 2023 on TNT. Collision was taped the same night as Dynamite and aired on tape delay on September 28.

=== Storylines ===
Grand Slam featured professional wrestling matches that involved different wrestlers from pre-existing scripted feuds and storylines. Storylines were produced on AEW's weekly television programs, Dynamite, Rampage, and Collision.

== Event ==
=== Dynamite ===
At the beginning of the Dynamite broadcast it was the opening match with Nigel McGuiness taking on Bryan Danielson. McGuiness ordered Danielson out and request the title be stripped if he didn't show up. Danielson then came out for the match. In the end, Danielson transitioned from a series of strikes into his signature LeBell Lock, forcing McGuinness to tap out.

Up next, was Hook taking on Roderick Strong for the FTW Championship in a FTW Rules match. In the end, Hook dodged the End of Heartache by Strong, Hook then quickly applied the Red Rum, making Strong tap out. After the match, Strong and his fellow Undisputed Kingdom members Matt Taven and Mike Bennett shook Hook's hand. Hook was then interviewed by Tony Schiavone and announced the retirement of the FTW title and gave it to his father Taz.

After that, the AEW World Tag Team Champions The Young Bucks (Matthew Jackson and Nicholas Jackson) put their titles on the line against Kyle Fletcher and Will Ospreay. In the end, After a chaotic sequence, The Bucks hit the BTE Trigger on Fletcher, following an illegal belt shot, to retain their titles.

In the penultimate match of the Dynamite broadcast, Mariah May put her AEW Women's Championship on the line against Yuka Sakazaki. In the end, May hit a high-angle Regal Knee followed by the Storm Zero for the pin retaining her championship in the process.

In the main event of the Dynamite broadcast, Jon Moxley faced Darby Allin with the winner facing Bryan Danielson for the AEW World Championship at WrestleDream. In the end, Moxley hit Allin with a Death Rider from the middle rope, securing the win and his spot as the number one contender.

== Results ==
Dynamite (aired live September 25)
No.	Results	Stipulations	Times
1	Bryan Danielson defeated Nigel McGuinness by submission	Singles match	18:50
2	Hook (c) defeated Roderick Strong (with Matt Taven and Mike Bennett) by submission	FTW Rules match for the FTW Championship	9:00
3	The Young Bucks (Matthew Jackson and Nicholas Jackson) (c) defeated Kyle Fletcher and Will Ospreay by pinfall	Tag team match for the AEW World Tag Team Championship	19:30
4	Mariah May (c) defeated Yuka Sakazaki by pinfall	Singles match for the AEW Women's World Championship	6:10
5	Jon Moxley (with Marina Shafir) defeated Darby Allin by pinfall	Singles match for Allin's AEW World Championship opportunity The winner faced Bryan Danielson for the championship at WrestleDream.	18:45
(c) / – the champion(s) heading into the match

Collision (taped September 25; aired September 28)
No.	Results	Stipulations	Times
1	Jamie Hayter defeated Saraya (with Harley Cameron) by pinfall	"Saraya's Rules" match The rules of the match were that only Saraya was allowed to use weapons, use closed fists, use hammerlocks, use outside interferences, not make use of the traditional 10 count, and use rope breaks. The winner received an autographed copy of Saraya's autobiography.	8:05
2	The Learning Tree (Chris Jericho, Big Bill, and Bryan Keith) defeated The Conglomeration (Mark Briscoe, Kyle O'Reilly, and Orange Cassidy) by pinfall	Tornado trios match	8:00
3	Brody King defeated Action Andretti by pinfall	Singles match	1:40
4	Jack Perry (c) defeated Minoru Suzuki by countout	Singles match for the AEW TNT Championship	8:15
5	Blackpool Combat Club (Pac, Claudio Castagnoli, and Wheeler Yuta) (c) defeated Komander and Private Party (Isiah Kassidy and Marq Quen) (with Alex Abrahantes) by submission	Trios match for the AEW World Trios Championship	7:10
6	Hologram defeated The Beast Mortos and Dralístico by pinfall	Three-way match	10:35
7	"Hangman" Adam Page defeated Jeff Jarrett (with Karen Jarrett) by pinfall	Lumberjack Strap match (Note: The lumberjacks were: Juice Robinson, Austin Gunn, Colten Gunn, Evil Uno, Alex Reynolds, John Silver, Jay Lethal, and Satnam Singh.)	13:20
8	Kazuchika Okada (c) defeated Sammy Guevara by pinfall	AEW Continental Championship Eliminator match Since Guevara lost, he could no longer challenge Okada for the title for as long as Okada was champion. Had Guevara won, he would have received a match for the title at Dynamite's 5 Year Anniversary Show.	12:20
(c) / – the champion(s) heading into the match
