= AEW Grand Slam (2021) =

All Elite Wrestling two-part television special

Coordinates: 40.750°N 73.847°W

- Promotional poster featuring various AEW wrestlers
- Promotion: All Elite Wrestling
- Date: September 22, 2021 (aired September 22 and 24, 2021)
- City: Flushing, Queens, New York
- Venue: Arthur Ashe Stadium
- Attendance: 20,177
- Tagline: For the First Time Ever

Grand Slam chronology
← Previous; First	Next → 2022

AEW Dynamite special episodes chronology
← Previous; Homecoming	Next → Winter Is Coming

AEW Rampage special episodes chronology
← Previous; The First Dance	Next → Holiday Bash

The 2021 Grand Slam was a two-part professional wrestling television special produced by All Elite Wrestling (AEW). It was the inaugural Grand Slam event and took place on September 22, 2021, at the Arthur Ashe Stadium in the Queens borough of New York City, encompassing the TNT broadcasts of Wednesday Night Dynamite and Friday Night Rampage. Dynamite aired live while Rampage aired on tape delay on September 24 and was expanded to two hours for the Grand Slam special. A total of 14 matches were contested, fiive of which aired live on Dynamite while six aired on Rampage. Three dark matches also occurred before the live event, which were shown on AEW's YouTube show, Elevation, on September 27.

Grand Slam was AEW's New York City debut and marked the first AEW event to be held in its entirety within a stadium. Until All In London in August 2023, it was AEW's most attended event with 20,177 fans in attendance. The event was highly praised by fans and critics with particular praise towards the Kenny Omega vs. Bryan Danielson match, which received a 5 star rating from wrestling journalist Dave Meltzer. The Rampage broadcast was also notable for CM Punk's first wrestling match on cable television since facing Billy Gunn on the January 20, 2014, episode of WWE Raw.

== Production ==
Other on-screen personnel
Role	Name
Commentators	Jim Ross (Dynamite)
Commentators	Excalibur (Dynamite and Rampage
Commentators	Tony Schiavone (Dynamite and Rampage)
Commentators	Taz (Rampage)
Commentators	Ricky Starks (Rampage)
Commentators	Don Callis (Trios match)
Commentators	Mark Henry (Dark: Elevation)
Commentators	Eddie Kingston (Dark: Elevation)
Ring announcer	Justin Roberts
Referees	Aubrey Edwards
Referees	Bryce Remsburg
Referees	Paul Turner
Referees	Rick Knox
Interviewers	Alex Marvez
Interviewers	Mark Henry

=== Background ===
Due to the COVID-19 pandemic that began affecting the industry in mid-March 2020, All Elite Wrestling (AEW) held the majority of their programs from Daily's Place in Jacksonville, Florida; these events were originally held without fans, but the company began running shows at 10–15% capacity in August, before eventually running full capacity shows in May 2021. In June, AEW announced that they would be returning to live touring, beginning with a special episode of Dynamite titled Road Rager on July 7. Shortly after, AEW announced that their September 22 episode would be another special episode of Dynamite titled Grand Slam. The event was scheduled to be held in the New York City borough of Queens, New York at the Arthur Ashe Stadium. Grand Slam marked AEW's first event held in New York City, which is primarily known as home territory for WWE, as well as their first full event to be held in a stadium.

During the September 15 episode of Dynamite, AEW announced that Grand Slam was expanded to a two-part event. The second Grand Slam show was announced to air on tape delay as the September 24 episode of Rampage, which also aired for two hours instead of its usual one-hour. Additionally, three dark matches were taped to be shown on the September 27 episode of AEW's YouTube show, Elevation.

==== COVID-19 procedures ====
With COVID-19 cases declining due to vaccinations in the United States and most establishments lifting pandemic protocols, AEW resumed live touring in early July, running shows at full venue capacity. Shortly after, however, COVID-19 cases began rising again due to the emergence of the Delta variant of the virus. On August 31, as a result of New York City policies, AEW announced that all ticketholders would be required to provide proof of at least one dose of a COVID-19 vaccine to enter Arthur Ashe Stadium, and masks would be required to be worn while attending the Grand Slam event.

=== Storylines ===
Grand Slam featured professional wrestling matches that involved different wrestlers from pre-existing scripted feuds and storylines. Wrestlers portrayed heroes, villains, or less distinguishable characters in scripted events that built tension and culminated in a wrestling match or series of matches. Storylines were produced on AEW's weekly television programs, Dynamite and Rampage, the supplementary online streaming shows, Dark and Elevation, and The Young Bucks' YouTube series Being The Elite.

==== Dynamite ====
On July 7 at Road Rager, Malakai Black debuted in AEW, attacking Cody Rhodes and his manager Arn Anderson. A match between Black and Cody was scheduled for Homecoming on August 4, which Black won in under five minutes. After the match, Cody teased retirement, removing one of his boots to leave in the ring before being attacked by Black. In the following weeks, Black would defeat Arn's son Brock Anderson, Cody's student Lee Johnson, and Cody's brother Dustin Rhodes. On September 8, a rematch between Black and Cody was announced for Dynamite: Grand Slam. On the September 15 episode of Dynamite, Black insulted Cody's fellow Go-Big Show judge Rosario Dawson, which led to Cody's first appearance on Dynamite since his loss to Black, and the two brawled into the crowd. In reality, Rhodes had taken time off to tape a new season of Go-Big Show and Dawson's appearance promoted the show.

On the September 8 episode of Dynamite, in Brian Pillman's home town of Cincinnati, Ohio, MJF expressed his disgust at the city as well as Pillman's sister and daughter, respectively. The Varsity Blondes, consisting of Brian's son Brian Pillman Jr., from nearby Erlanger, Kentucky, and Griff Garrison, came to the ring to defend the Pillmans, which resulted in the two being beaten up by MJF and Wardlow. A match between MJF and Pillman was later made for Dynamite: Grand Slam.

At All Out, Ruby Soho debuted as the Joker in the Casino Battle Royale, winning the match by last eliminating Thunder Rosa and earning a match against Dr. Britt Baker, D.M.D. for the AEW Women's World Championship. On September 15, it was announced that this match would take place at Dynamite: Grand Slam.

At All Out, after Adam Cole debuted to assist The Elite, Bryan Danielson also made a surprise debut to fend off The Elite. In the following weeks, Danielson tried to goad Elite member and AEW World Champion Kenny Omega into a match. On the September 15 episode of Dynamite, Danielson formally challenged Omega to a non-title match, which Omega accepted against the advice of Don Callis, marking Danielson's AEW in-ring debut and his first match against Omega since 2009. The match was scheduled for Dynamite: Grand Slam.

==== Rampage ====
At All Out, Adam Cole debuted in AEW, assisting his former Bullet Club stablemates Kenny Omega and The Young Bucks (Matt Jackson and Nick Jackson) in a beatdown of Christian Cage and Jurassic Express. On the September 15 episode of Dynamite, Cole won his AEW in-ring debut against Frankie Kazarian. Following the match, Cole challenged Cage, Jungle Boy, and Luchasaurus to a six-man tag match against him and The Young Bucks in a reunion of the Superkliq, which was scheduled for Rampage: Grand Slam.

At Fyter Fest, Dan Lambert of American Top Team made an appearance, running down AEW for not being as good as wrestling was in his youth. In the following months, he would ally himself with the Men of the Year (Ethan Page and Scorpio Sky), continuing to deride AEW and its fans. On the September 15 episode of Dynamite, Lambert, surrounded by several America's Top Team members, was confronted by The Inner Circle's Chris Jericho and Jake Hager. Citing his own shoot fights in locker rooms over the years as well as Hager's undefeated record in Bellator MMA, Jericho challenged Page and Sky to a match, which Lambert accepted on their behalf, and it was scheduled for Rampage: Grand Slam.

After defeating Darby Allin at All Out in his first match in over seven years, CM Punk pondered who his next opponent would be while complementing several wrestlers on the AEW roster. He was interrupted from the commentary table by Taz, who criticized Punk's "love-fest". The following week on Dynamite, Punk was a guest commentator for the first hour before being attacked by Team Taz members Powerhouse Hobbs and Taz's son Hook. A match between Punk and Hobbs was later made official for Rampage: Grand Slam.

Prior to All Out, Jon Moxley had challenged anyone from New Japan Pro-Wrestling (NJPW) to face him at the show. His challenge was answered by Satoshi Kojima in a match that Moxley won, but after the match, Moxley was confronted by NJPW's Minoru Suzuki. A match between the two was made for the ensuing episode of Dynamite, which Moxley won in his hometown of Cincinnati; prior to the match, Suzuki's iconic "Kaze ni Nare" entrance music was cut off. Citing hometown bias, Suzuki and his Suzuki-gun stablemate Lance Archer challenged Moxley and Eddie Kingston to a tag team match at Rampage: Grand Slam.

== Reception ==
Grand Slam was well received by fans and critics who watched both shows, with many calling the match between Kenny Omega and Bryan Danielson the best television match of all time. Chris Mueller of Bleacher Report reviewed the Dynamite portion, saying, "this episode of Dynamite might be the best one yet." He believed every match to be "either good or great" noting the non-wrestling segments "didn't overstay their welcome." He gave Omega–Danielson the highest letter grade of A+, going on to say: "Danielson looked as good as he ever has, and Omega seemed to approach this contest like he would any big title defense. Both men left everything they had in the ring. To say this match lived up to expectations might be an understatement. The finish might seem like a cop-out to some, but it might have been the smartest approach to this feud."

Dan Gartland of Sports Illustrated also reviewed the Dynamite portion. He called Grand Slam an "anomaly", noting: "AEW put on a show worthy of such a massive, enthusiastic crowd. The Danielson–Omega match was one of the best the company has ever had." Also noting the difference of television match quality and writing between AEW and WWE, he praised the draw between Omega and Danielson, saying: "The Danielson–Omega match should not have had a decisive winner. It was Danielson’s first match in AEW and it would have been detrimental to his character to have him lose. But having Omega, the world champion, lose to a guy who had never wrestled for the company, would have cheapened his title reign. In WWE, a non-finish would have featured outside interference, a double count-out or some other kind of chicanery that makes for an unsatisfying conclusion. But in AEW, the story Danielson and Omega told made both men look stronger."

Dave Meltzer of the Wrestling Observer Newsletter gave the Omega–Danielson match a five star rating, which earned Danielson the first match in his career rated five or more stars by Meltzer, and Omega's eighteenth such match, the first rating of its kind since his bout with Rey Fénix on the January 6 New Year's Smash edition of Dynamite (eventually one of three such matches in 2021).

=== Television ratings ===
Dynamite and Rampage both topped the cable rating charts on their respective days. On Wednesday, Dynamite averaged 1.273 million viewers, earning a 0.48 Nielsen rating while Rampage on Friday averaged 640,000 viewers with a 0.28 rating.

== Results ==
Dynamite (aired live September 22)
No.	Results	Stipulations	Times
1^{DE}	Thunder Rosa defeated Kayla Sparks by pinfall	Singles match	3:11
2^{DE}	The Dark Order (Alex Reynolds, John Silver, Preston "10" Vance, and Alan "5" Angels) defeated Dean Alexander, Kevin Tibbs, TJ Crawford, and Eric James by pinfall	Eight-man tag team match	5:42
3^{DE}	Paul Wight defeated RSP, CPA, and VSK by pinfall	3-on-1 Handicap match	3:41
4	Kenny Omega (with Don Callis) vs. Bryan Danielson ended in a time limit draw	Singles match	30:00
5	MJF (with Wardlow) defeated Brian Pillman Jr. (with Julia Hart) by submission	Singles match	9:20
6	Malakai Black defeated Cody Rhodes (with Arn Anderson and Brandi Rhodes) by pinfall	Singles match	11:05
7	Sting and Darby Allin defeated FTR (Dax Harwood and Cash Wheeler) (with Tully Blanchard) by submission	Tag team match	9:25
8	Dr. Britt Baker, D.M.D. (c) (with Jamie Hayter and Rebel) defeated Ruby Soho by submission	Singles match for the AEW Women's World Championship	13:20
(c) / – the champion(s) heading into the match; DE / – the match was taped for a future broadcast of Dark: Elevation

Rampage (taped September 22; aired September 24)
No.	Results	Stipulations	Times
1	CM Punk defeated Powerhouse Hobbs (with Hook) by pinfall	Singles match	13:35
2	Superkliq (Adam Cole and The Young Bucks (Matt Jackson and Nick Jackson)) (with Doc Gallows and Brandon Cutler) defeated Christian Cage and Jurassic Express (Jungle Boy and Luchasaurus) (with Marko Stunt) by pinfall	Six-man tag team match	14:35
3	Men of the Year (Scorpio Sky and Ethan Page) (with Dan Lambert) defeated The Inner Circle (Chris Jericho and Jake Hager) by pinfall	Tag team match	11:00
4	The Lucha Brothers (Penta El Zero Miedo and Rey Fénix) and Santana and Ortiz (with Alex Abrahantes) defeated Hardy Family Office (Private Party (Isiah Kassidy and Marq Quen) and The Butcher and The Blade) (with Matt Hardy and Jack Evans) by pinfall	Eight-man tag team match	9:20
5	Penelope Ford defeated Anna Jay by pinfall	Singles match	6:45
6	Jon Moxley and Eddie Kingston defeated Suzuki-gun (Minoru Suzuki and Lance Archer) by pinfall	Lights Out match	14:56

== See also ==
- 2021 in professional wrestling
