= Grand Slam Mexico (2025) =

All Elite Wrestling and Consejo Mundial de Lucha Libre television special

- Promotional poster featuring Místico, MJF, Kazuchika Okada, Will Ospreay, Máscara Dorada, and Hologram
- Promotion(s): All Elite Wrestling; Consejo Mundial de Lucha Libre
- Date: June 18, 2025
- City: Mexico City, Mexico
- Venue: Arena México
- Attendance: 14,000

Grand Slam chronology
← Previous; Australia (2025)	Next → Australia (2026)

AEW Dynamite special episodes chronology
← Previous; Summer Blockbuster	Next → Dynamite 300

The 2025 Grand Slam Mexico was a professional wrestling television special produced by the American company All Elite Wrestling (AEW) in partnership with the Mexican promotion Consejo Mundial de Lucha Libre (CMLL). It was the sixth Grand Slam event and the inaugural Grand Slam Mexico. It took place on June 18, 2025, at Arena México in Mexico City, Mexico. The event aired live as a special episode of Wednesday Night Dynamite, simulcast on TBS and Max in the United States and Fox Sports Mexico in Mexico, and it had a special runtime of 2.5 hours instead of Dynamite's normal two hours. This marked AEW's first televised event in the country and was the first time Grand Slam was held twice in one calendar year, following Grand Slam Australia in February.

Six matches were held at the event. In the main event, The Beast Mortos, Death Riders (Jon Moxley and Wheeler Yuta), and The Young Bucks (Matthew Jackson and Nicholas Jackson) defeated The Opps (Samoa Joe, Powerhouse Hobbs, and Katsuyori Shibata), Swerve Strickland, and Will Ospreay in a 10-man tag team match. In other prominent matches, CMLL's Místico defeated AEW's MJF, Kazuchika Okada defeated Mark Briscoe, and AEW's Mercedes Moné defeated CMLL's Zeuxis to win the CMLL World Women's Championship.

== Production ==
=== Background ===
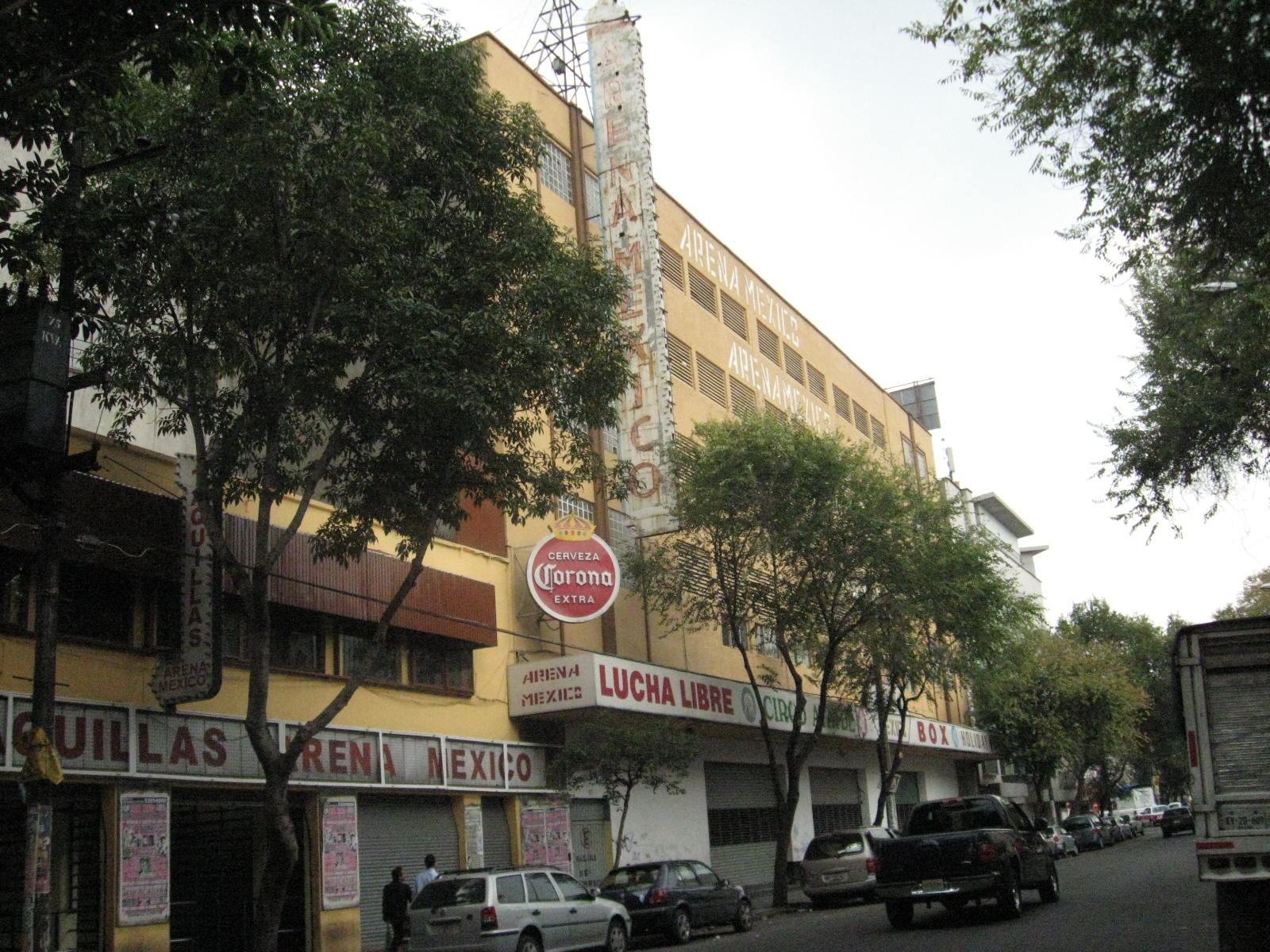
Grand Slam Mexico took place at the historic Arena México in Mexico City, Mexico, which is owned and operated by All Elite Wrestling's Mexican partner promotion and co-producers of the event, Consejo Mundial de Lucha Libre.

Grand Slam is a professional wrestling television special produced by the American promotion All Elite Wrestling (AEW) since 2021. From its inception until 2024, the event was held annually in late September at the Arthur Ashe Stadium in the New York City borough of Queens. It also originally aired as a two-part special—from 2021 to 2023, it encompassed the broadcasts of Wednesday Night Dynamite and Friday Night Rampage, while in 2024, it aired as Dynamite and Saturday Night Collision. AEW then held Grand Slam Australia in February 2025, which was the company's first event in Australia and aired as a standalone special.

On April 16, 2025, AEW scheduled a second Grand Slam event for the year to be held on June 18 at Arena México in Mexico City, marking the company's first televised event in Mexico. Grand Slam Mexico was held in partnership with the Mexican promotion Consejo Mundial de Lucha Libre (CMLL), the owners and primary operators of Arena México. It aired live as a special episode of Dynamite, simulcast on TBS and the streaming service Max in the United States, and Fox Sports Mexico in Mexico. Tickets went on sale on April 26 and sold out within 48 hours. Grand Slam Mexico had a special runtime of 2.5 hours instead of Dynamite's regular two hours.

=== Storylines ===
Grand Slam Mexico featured professional wrestling matches that involved different wrestlers from pre-existing scripted feuds and storylines. Storylines were produced on AEW's weekly television programs, Dynamite and Collision, as well as CMLL's weekly Friday night show Super Viernes and other CMLL events.

== Results ==
No.	Results	Stipulations	Times
1	Adam Cole, Atlantis, Atlantis Jr., Bandido, Brody King, Daniel Garcia, and Templario defeated Dax Harwood, Don Callis Family (Hechicero, Josh Alexander, Konosuke Takeshita, Kyle Fletcher, and Lance Archer), and Volador Jr. (with Stokely) by pinfall	14-man tag team match	15:41
2	Kazuchika Okada (with Don Callis) defeated Mark Briscoe by pinfall	Singles match	13:04
3	Místico defeated MJF (with Bobby Lashley, MVP, and Shelton Benjamin) by disqualification	Singles match	16:48
4	Hologram defeated Lio Rush, Máscara Dorada, and Ricochet by pinfall	4 Million Pesos Four-way match	15:28
5	Mercedes Moné defeated Zeuxis (c) by pinfall	Singles match for the CMLL World Women's Championship	9:31
6	The Beast Mortos, Death Riders (Jon Moxley and Wheeler Yuta), and The Young Bucks (Matthew Jackson and Nicholas Jackson) (with Marina Shafir) defeated The Opps (Samoa Joe, Powerhouse Hobbs, and Katsuyori Shibata), Swerve Strickland, and Will Ospreay (with Prince Nana) by pinfall	10-man tag team match	15:43
(c) / – the champion(s) heading into the match

== See also ==
- CMLL vs. AEW & ROH
- Fantastica Mania
- Global Wars Mexico
