= AEW Grand Slam =

All Elite Wrestling television special series

- AEW Grand Slam logo in 2024
- Promotions: All Elite Wrestling
- First event: 2021

AEW Grand Slam is a series of professional wrestling television specials produced by the American promotion All Elite Wrestling (AEW). The event was established in 2021 and is typically broadcast as special episodes of AEW's weekly television programs.

The event was originally held annually in late September. From 2021 to 2023, Grand Slam aired as a two-part special, encompassing the broadcasts of Wednesday Night Dynamite and Friday Night Rampage, while in 2024, it aired as Dynamite and Saturday Night Collision. In 2025, the event became an international attraction with multiple Grand Slam events held per year. AEW held two separate Grand Slam specials in 2025. The first was Grand Slam Australia in February, which was a one-night standalone special, and then the second was Grand Slam Mexico in June, which aired as a special episode of Dynamite and was held in partnership with the Mexican promotion Consejo Mundial de Lucha Libre. Grand Slam Australia and Grand Slam Mexico returned in February and August 2026, respectively, with a third, Grand Slam France, scheduled for October at the Adidas Arena.

The inaugural 2021 event was AEW's first event to take place entirely within a stadium, which was the Arthur Ashe Stadium, as well as the promotion's first event held in New York City. Grand Slam would subsequently continue to be held annually at the Arthur Ashe Stadium until 2025. The respective February and June 2025 events were AEW's first events in Australia and Mexico. Three Grand Slams were scheduled to be held in 2026, with the first two returning AEW to Australia and Mexico, and the third marking the promotion's first event in France.

== History ==
Due to the COVID-19 pandemic that began affecting the industry in mid-March 2020, All Elite Wrestling (AEW) held the majority of their professional wrestling programs from Daily's Place in Jacksonville, Florida; these events were originally held without fans, but the company began running shows at 10–15% capacity in August, before eventually running full capacity shows in May 2021. In June, AEW announced that they would be returning to live touring, beginning with a special episode of Wednesday Night Dynamite titled Road Rager on July 7. Shortly after, AEW announced that their September 22 episode would be another special episode of Dynamite titled Grand Slam. The event was scheduled to be held in the New York City borough of Queens, New York at the Arthur Ashe Stadium. Grand Slam marked AEW's first event held in New York City, which is primarily known as home territory for WWE, as well as their first full event to be held in a stadium.

During the September 15 episode of Dynamite, AEW announced that Grand Slam was expanded to a two-part event. The second part was announced to air on tape delay as the September 24 episode of Friday Night Rampage, which also aired for two hours instead of its usual one-hour. Additionally, three dark matches were taped to be shown as the September 27 episode of AEW's YouTube show, Elevation.

On May 11, 2022, AEW president Tony Khan confirmed that Grand Slam would return to the Arthur Ashe Stadium later that year and the show would continue forward as an annual event at the same venue. During the Forbidden Door pay-per-view (PPV) on June 26, the 2022 Grand Slam's date was confirmed for September 21, with Dynamite airing live that night and Rampage airing on tape delay on September 23.

The 2024 event was announced on June 30, 2024, and scheduled for September 25. Unlike the prior three years, the 2024 event was announced to air as Dynamite on TBS and Saturday Night Collision, which premiered in June 2023 on TNT. Collision was taped the same night as Dynamite and aired on tape delay on September 28.

During All In on August 25, 2024, AEW announced Grand Slam Australia for February 15, 2025, at the Suncorp Stadium in Brisbane, Queensland, Australia, breaking Grand Slam's tradition of being held as an annual two-part special at the Arthur Ashe Stadium in late September. The event was also reduced to one night and was AEW's first event to be held in Australia. Reportedly due to low ticket sales, however, the event was relocated to the smaller Brisbane Entertainment Centre. Although it was never announced as such, it was originally believed that Grand Slam Australia would be broadcast as a PPV event. However, during the January 15, 2025, episode of Dynamite, it was confirmed that the event would again be a television special, simulcast on TNT and Max, airing on tape delay that night in place of Collision.

On April 16, 2025, AEW scheduled a second Grand Slam event for the year to be held on June 18 at Arena México in Mexico City, marking the company's first event in Mexico. Grand Slam Mexico was also held in partnership with the Mexican promotion Consejo Mundial de Lucha Libre (CMLL) and it aired as a special episode of Dynamite with a runtime of 2.5 hours instead of Dynamite's regular two hours.

== Events ==
#	Event	Date	City	Venue	Main event	Ref.
1	Grand Slam (2021)	Night 1: Dynamite; September 22, 2021	Flushing, Queens, New York	Arthur Ashe Stadium	Dr. Britt Baker, D.M.D. (c) vs. Ruby Soho for the AEW Women's World Championship	
1	Grand Slam (2021)	Night 2: Rampage; September 22, 2021 (aired September 24)	Flushing, Queens, New York	Arthur Ashe Stadium	Jon Moxley and Eddie Kingston vs. Suzuki-gun (Minoru Suzuki and Lance Archer) in a Lights Out match	
2	Grand Slam (2022)	Night 1: Dynamite; September 21, 2022	Flushing, Queens, New York	Arthur Ashe Stadium	Bryan Danielson vs. Jon Moxley for the vacant AEW World Championship	
2	Grand Slam (2022)	Night 2: Rampage; September 21, 2022 (aired September 23)	Flushing, Queens, New York	Arthur Ashe Stadium	Powerhouse Hobbs vs. Ricky Starks in a Lights Out match	
3	Grand Slam (2023)	Night 1: Dynamite; September 20, 2023	Flushing, Queens, New York	Arthur Ashe Stadium	MJF (c) vs. Samoa Joe for the AEW World Championship	
3	Grand Slam (2023)	Night 2: Rampage; September 20, 2023 (aired September 22)	Flushing, Queens, New York	Arthur Ashe Stadium	Mogul Embassy (Brian Cage, Bishop Kaun, and Toa Liona) (c) vs. The Elite (Matt Jackson, Nick Jackson, and "Hangman" Adam Page) for the ROH World Six-Man Tag Team Championship	
4	Grand Slam (2024)	Night 1: Dynamite; September 25, 2024	Flushing, Queens, New York	Arthur Ashe Stadium	Jon Moxley vs. Darby Allin for Allin's AEW World Championship opportunity	
4	Grand Slam (2024)	Night 2: Collision; September 25, 2024 (aired September 28)	Flushing, Queens, New York	Arthur Ashe Stadium	Kazuchika Okada (c) vs. Sammy Guevara in an AEW Continental Championship Eliminator match	
5	Grand Slam Australia (2025)	February 15, 2025	Brisbane, Queensland, Australia	Brisbane Entertainment Centre	Mariah May (c) vs. "Timeless" Toni Storm for the AEW Women's World Championship	
6	Grand Slam Mexico (2025)	Dynamite; June 18, 2025	Mexico City, Mexico	Arena México	The Beast Mortos, Death Riders (Jon Moxley and Wheeler Yuta), and The Young Bucks (Matthew Jackson and Nicholas Jackson) vs. Will Ospreay, Swerve Strickland, and The Opps (Samoa Joe, Powerhouse Hobbs, and Katsuyori Shibata),	
7	Grand Slam Australia (2026)	February 14, 2026	Sydney, New South Wales, Australia	Qudos Bank Arena	MJF (c) vs. Brody King for the AEW World Championship	
8	Grand Slam Mexico (2026)	August 5, 2026	Mexico City, Mexico	Arena México	Will Ospreay vs. Mark Davis in a Mexico City Street Fight	
9	Grand Slam France	October 6, 2026	Paris, France	Adidas Arena	Will Ospreay (c) vs. Kazuchika Okada for the AEW World Championship	
(c) – refers to the champion(s) heading into the match

== See also ==
- List of All Elite Wrestling pay-per-view events
- List of All Elite Wrestling special events
- List of AEW Collision special episodes
- List of AEW Dynamite special episodes
- List of AEW Rampage special episodes
