= Grand Slam Australia (2025) =

All Elite Wrestling television special

- Promotional poster featuring various AEW wrestlers
- Promotion: All Elite Wrestling
- Date: February 15, 2025
- City: Brisbane, Queensland, Australia
- Venue: Brisbane Entertainment Centre
- Attendance: 13,000

Grand Slam chronology
← Previous; 2024	Next → Mexico

AEW special event chronology
← Previous; Homecoming	Next → Global Wars Australia

AEW in Australia chronology
← Previous; First	Next → Global Wars Australia

Grand Slam Australia chronology
← Previous; First	Next → 2026

The 2025 Grand Slam Australia was a professional wrestling television special produced by the American company All Elite Wrestling (AEW). It was the fifth Grand Slam event and the inaugural Grand Slam Australia. It took place on Saturday, February 15, 2025, at the Brisbane Entertainment Centre in Brisbane, Queensland, Australia, which was AEW's first event in the country. The special was simulcast on TNT and Max in the United States, airing on tape delay later that same day in place of AEW's regular Saturday night program, Collision. (Note: The event was taped at 6:30 p.m. Australian Eastern Standard Time, which is 3:30 a.m. Eastern Time (ET) in the United States. Due to this time difference, the event was slated to air later that same day at 10:30 p.m. ET in the US after the NBA All-Star Weekend coverage; it ended up airing at 10:52 p.m. ET.)

This was the first expansion of AEW's Grand Slam brand of events, which were previously exclusively held annually in the United States at the Arthur Ashe Stadium in Queens, New York from 2021 to 2024. Beginning with this 2025 Australian event, Grand Slam became an international attraction with multiple events held per year, as a second Grand Slam for 2025 was subsequently scheduled for June as Grand Slam Mexico.

Five matches were contested at the event. In the main event, Australia's own "Timeless" Toni Storm defeated Mariah May to win her record-setting fourth AEW Women's World Championship. In another prominent match, which was the opening bout, Will Ospreay and Kenny Omega defeated The Don Callis Family (Kyle Fletcher and Konosuke Takeshita).

== Production ==
=== Background ===
Grand Slam is an annual professional wrestling television special produced by the American promotion All Elite Wrestling (AEW) since 2021. From its inception until 2024, the event was held in late September at the Arthur Ashe Stadium in the New York City borough of Queens. It also originally aired as a two-part special—from 2021 to 2023, it encompassed the broadcasts of Wednesday Night Dynamite and Friday Night Rampage, while in 2024, it aired as Dynamite and Saturday Night Collision.

During All In on August 25, 2024, AEW announced that the fifth Grand Slam would be moved up towards the beginning of the year, taking place on Saturday, February 15, 2025. Additionally, the 2025 event was announced to be broadcast as a one-night event in Brisbane, Queensland, marking AEW's first event in Australia, with the event subsequently branded as Grand Slam Australia. This announcement came shortly after AEW president Tony Khan confirmed that the company were scouting venues to potentially hold an event in Australia in 2025. Suncorp Stadium, with a listed capacity of over 52,500, was originally slated to host the event, but on November 25, it was reported that AEW would be moving Grand Slam Australia, citing low ticket sales. The new venue was subsequently confirmed as the Brisbane Entertainment Centre, with a listed capacity of 13,500.

During the January 15, 2025, episode of Dynamite, it was confirmed that Grand Slam Australia would air on February 15 at 8:00 p.m. Eastern Time (ET) on tape delay in place of Collision, simulcast on TNT and Max in the United States. However, due to a scheduling conflict with TNT's annual NBA All-Star Weekend coverage, Grand Slam Australia was slated to air at 10:30 p.m. ET, or whenever the All-Star coverage concluded, which ended up being 10:52 p.m. According to Khan, the opportunity to air Grand Slam Australia after the All-Star coverage was presented to AEW by Warner Bros. Discovery, the parent company of TNT and Max. On February 12, it was revealed that Global Wars Australia, a co-promoted show with sister promotion Ring of Honor, would be taped back-to-back with Grand Slam Australia.

There was some controversy among fans whether Grand Slam Australia would be a live pay-per-view (PPV) event, but according to Khan, the show was always planned to be a television special. He also stated that producing a live PPV from Australia would have been challenging, thinking that many U.S. viewers would not have watched it live due to the time difference—the event occurred at 6:30 p.m. Australian Eastern Standard Time, which is 3:30 a.m. ET. This series of events sparked backlash among many attending fans, who felt scammed into believing Grand Slam Australia would be a bigger event, citing its original promotional presentation, while traveling fans reported increased costs and lack of refund options from the show's venue change.

=== Storylines ===
Grand Slam Australia featured professional wrestling matches that involved different wrestlers from pre-existing scripted feuds and storylines. Storylines were produced on AEW's weekly television programs, Dynamite and Collision.

On the July 10, 2024, episode of Dynamite, Mariah May, protégé of then-AEW Women's World Champion "Timeless" Toni Storm, won the Owen Hart Foundation Tournament to earn a title shot against Storm. Immediately after winning the tournament, May turned on Storm and then defeated her at All In for the title. After losing the title, Storm went on hiatus for nearly four months. She returned on December 11 at Dynamite: Winter is Coming, reprising her "Rockstar" persona, and acted as if she had just made her AEW debut. At Dynamite: Maximum Carnage, Storm won a Casino Gauntlet match to earn a title shot against May. At Collision: Homecoming on January 25, 2025, during a face-to-face with May, Storm revealed that her reprisal of her "Rockstar" persona was a ruse and that she had been "Timeless" the entire time.

== Results ==
No.	Results	Stipulations	Times
1	Will Ospreay and Kenny Omega defeated Don Callis Family (Kyle Fletcher and Konosuke Takeshita) (with Mark Davis) by pinfall	Tag team match	23:50
2	Mercedes Moné (c) defeated Harley Cameron by pinfall	Singles match for the AEW TBS Championship	12:45
3	Death Riders (Jon Moxley and Claudio Castagnoli) (with Marina Shafir) defeated Cope and Jay White by technical submission	Brisbane Brawl	14:40
4	Kazuchika Okada (c) defeated Buddy Matthews by pinfall	Singles match for the AEW Continental Championship	13:25
5	"Timeless" Toni Storm (with Luther) defeated Mariah May (c) by pinfall	Singles match for the AEW Women's World Championship	15:10
(c) / – the champion(s) heading into the match
