= Hook (wrestler) =

American professional wrestler

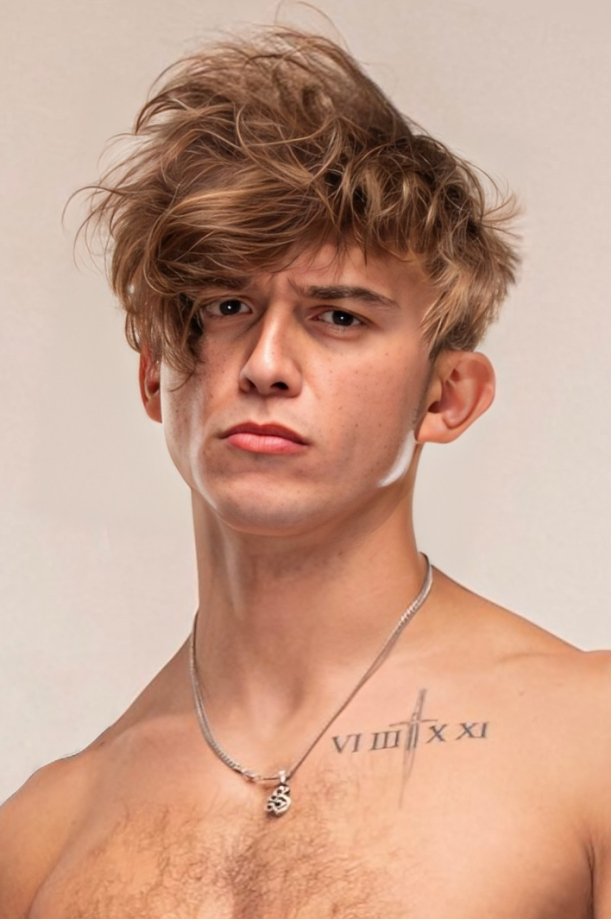
- Hook in 2022

Personal information
- Born: Tyler Cole Senerchia; May 4, 1999 (age 27) Massapequa, New York, U.S.
- Parent: Taz (father)
- Family: Chris Chetti (first cousin, once removed)

Professional wrestling career
- Ring name: Hook
- Billed height: 6 ft 0 in (183 cm)
- Billed weight: 201 lb (91 kg)
- Billed from: St. Mark's Place; New York, New York
- Trained by: Brian Myers; Pat Buck; Cody Rhodes; Q. T. Marshall
- Debut: December 8, 2021

Tyler Cole Senerchia (born May 4, 1999) is an American professional wrestler. He is signed to All Elite Wrestling (AEW), where he performs under the ring name Hook (often stylized as HOOK) and is a member of The Opps stable. He is a former three-time and the final FTW Champion. He also makes appearances with its sister promotion Ring of Honor (ROH) and on the independent circuit.

== Professional wrestling career ==
=== All Elite Wrestling (2020–present) ===
==== Team Taz (2020–2022) ====
On the November 25, 2020, episode of AEW Dynamite, Senerchia, under the ring name Hook, made his first appearance in All Elite Wrestling (AEW) as a heel, aligning himself with his father Taz as part of Team Taz, also consisting of Brian Cage, Ricky Starks, and Powerhouse Hobbs. On December 8, 2021, Hook made his professional wrestling debut against Fuego Del Sol for an episode of AEW Rampage, which aired two days later. Hook won the match by submission with a half nelson choke called "Redrum". Shortly after the match aired, AEW president Tony Khan announced that Hook had signed a contract with the company. Hook's debut, which had become an internet meme before the match, garnered praise from critics, with several praising his level of skill despite being a rookie. Two weeks later, Hook would quickly defeat Bear Bronson at Rampage: Holiday Bash. His next match would be a win over Aaron Solo, which would begin a feud with Q. T. Marshall. The feud would culminate with Hook defeating Marshall on Revolution's pre-show, The Buy In, on March 6, 2022. In May, Hook began to work with Danhausen, turning face in the process.

==== FTW Champion (2022–2024) ====
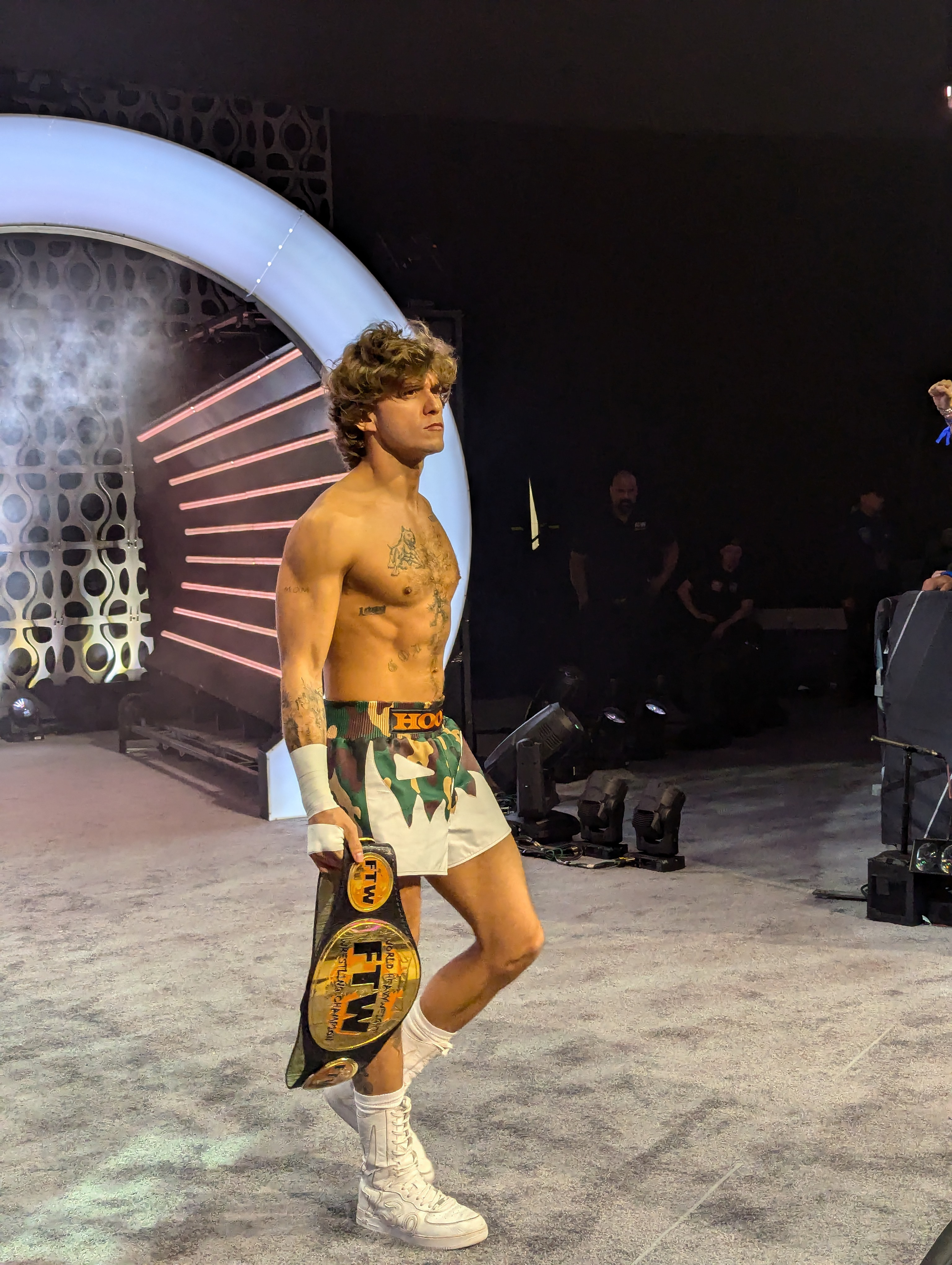
Hook as the FTW Champion in September 2024

On July 27 at Dynamite: Fight for the Fallen, Hook defeated Ricky Starks for the FTW Championship, a title established by his father in the Extreme Championship Wrestling (ECW) promotion and reintroduced by Taz in AEW in 2020.

Hook would then begin to team up with Jungle Boy to feud with The Firm and to defeat its members, Lee Moriarty, Ethan Page and Big Bill in various tag team matches, and would continue to feud with them in Jungle Boy's absence until Double or Nothing, in the Buy-In teaming up with the Hardy's and defeating Ethan Page & The Gunns. On June 25, 2023, at Forbidden Door, Jungle Boy, by this point known by his given name Jack Perry, attacked Hook after losing his match for the IWGP World Heavyweight Championship against Sanada, turning heel in the process. On July 19 at Blood & Guts, Perry defeated Hook for the FTW Championship, ending his first reign at 357 days and giving Hook his first singles loss in his AEW career in the process. On August 27 during All In: Zero Hour, Hook defeated Perry to win the FTW Championship for the record tying second time, sharing the record with his father. In March 2024, Chris Jericho attempted to form a mentor-student relationship with Hook. However, Jericho was rebuffed, ultimately leading to a title match between the two at Dynasty, where Jericho won the FTW Championship, ending Hook's second reign at 238 days. At Double or Nothing on May 26, Hook was unsuccessful in recapturing the FTW Championship in a three-way also involving Katsuyori Shibata. On August 25 at All In, Hook defeated Jericho to recapture the FTW Championship. After a successful title defense against Roderick Strong at Dynamite: Grand Slam on September 25, Hook announced the retirement of the FTW Championship and handed the title back to his father, ending his third reign at 31 days as the final champion.

==== The Opps (2024–present) ====
During Hook's FTW title reigns, he formed an alliance with Samoa Joe, and later Katsuyori Shibata, which would be named "The Opps". In October 2024, Hook began a feud with The Patriarchy (Christian Cage, Kip Sabian, and Nick Wayne) after it was revealed that Cage was the one that attacked his father Taz. On January 15, 2025 at Maximum Carnage, Hook defeated Cage by disqualification. On the February 20 episode of Dynamite, The Opps defeated The Patriarchy, ending the feud. On the April 16 at Dynamite: Spring BreakThru, Hook was scheduled in an AEW World Trios Championship match between The Opps and the Death Riders (Claudio Castagnoli, Jon Moxley, and Wheeler Yuta), however he was (kayfabe) attacked by the Death Riders off-camera and was pulled from the match. This came after he legitimately vomited during a match with Death Riders the previous week. On May 25 at Double or Nothing, Hook returned and briefly assisted The Opps in their Anarchy in the Arena match against the Death Riders. After a three-month absence, Hook returned on the August 27 episode of Dynamite, where he attacked Wheeler Yuta.

On the September 12 episode of Dynamite, Hook announced that he would be leaving The Opps. On September 20 at All Out, Hook came to the aid of Eddie Kingston from an attack by Big Bill and Bryan Keith. At Full Gear on November 22, Hook would turn heel by attacking "Hangman" Adam Page during his steel cage AEW World Championship defence with Samoa Joe, thus rejoining The Opps and allowing Joe to win the title.

On the February 7, 2026 episode of Collision, Hook announced that he would temporarily take leadership of The Opps due to Samoa Joe suffering an undisclosed injury until Joe's return on the April 22 episode of Dynamite. On the May 2 episode of Collision, Hook unsuccessfully challenged Kevin Knight for the AEW TNT Championship.

=== Independent circuit (2026–present) ===
On January 16, 2026 at Limitless Wrestling's Limitless Rumble, Hook defeated Leo Sparrow. and would make his Game Changer Wrestling debut on June 19, 2026 defeating Joey Janela, he would challenge Atticus Cougar for the GCW world championship via DQ.

== Professional wrestling style and persona ==
Hook's finisher, named Redrum, is a half nelson choke (also known as a kata ha jime), the same as his father's finisher, the Tazmission. He has been nicknamed "The Cold-Hearted Handsome Devil". Hook initially used the Action Bronson song "The Chairman's Intent" from the album Blue Chips 7000 as his entrance theme. Upon his August 27 return, he began to use Jay-Jay Johanson's song, "So Tell The Girls That I Am Back In Town". He was described by The New York Times' Dan Brooks as "[A] thrilling in-ring wrestler who combines judo-influenced throws with explosive speed and low body-fat percentage."

Hook's presentation upon his debut was as a stoic figure, going an extended period on TV without uttering a word, and frequently eating a bag of chips. GQ's Graham Isador described his persona during this period of time as "a background character, a Gen-Z henchman mean-mugging to the camera". Dan Brooks described his gimmick as "brooding, with high-volume Zoomer hair that hangs into his eyes and makes him seem either surly or deep, depending on your demographic". Hook would keep this personality upon turning face by assisting, and ultimately teaming with infrequent wrestler and comedic face, Danhausen under the name 'Hookhausen'. On the pairing and Hook's persona, Brooks would also state, "[H]is presentation is also deeply serious in a way that risks shading over into unintentional comedy. Pairing him with Danhausen was a genius move..."

As Hook moved into a partnership with Samoa Joe which would serve as the foundation of their faction The Opps, multiple backstage vignettes featuring dialogue styled in the manner of Jules Winfield and Vincent Vega's conversations within the Quentin Tarantino film Pulp Fiction were aired on AEW TV. These sequences featured Joe and Hook bantering about something unrelated to their matter at hand (occasionally with fellow Opps teammate Katsuyori Shibata implied to be behind the camera) before jumping foes in the backstage area.

== Personal life ==
Senerchia is the son of retired professional wrestler Peter Senerchia, better known as Taz. He is of Italian descent through his father and Irish descent through his mother.

Senerchia played lacrosse at Plainedge High School, garnering all-state honors and being ranked 74th in the nation by Inside Lacrosse. In 2018, Senerchia served as a long-stick midfielder for the Bucknell Bison men's lacrosse team; he subsequently transferred to the Sacred Heart Pioneers.

== Championships and accomplishments ==
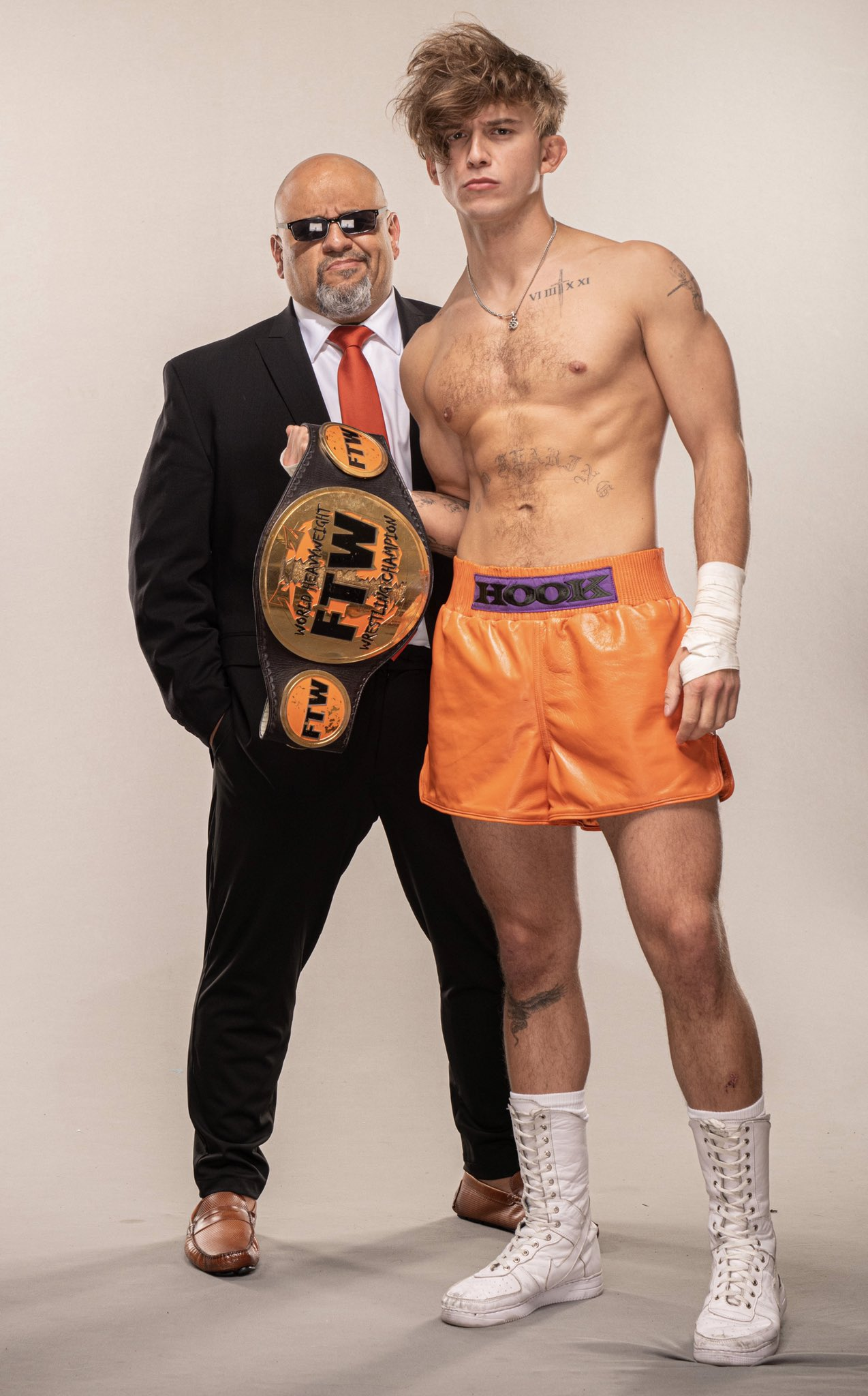
Hook holds the record as three-time FTW Champion, standing beside his father Taz (left), who created the FTW Title and is the inaugural and two-time champion

- All Elite Wrestling
  - FTW Championship (3 times, final)
  - FTW Contender Series (2024) – shared with Katsuyori Shibata
- Pro Wrestling Illustrated
  - Rookie of the Year (2022)
