= Cagefighter: Worlds Collide =

2020 British-American action sports film

- Release poster
- Directed by: Jesse Quinones
- Written by: Jesse Quinones
- Produced by: Shayne Putzlocher; Sara Shaak; Jessica Gaube; Jesse Quinones; Lorianne Hall
- Starring: Alex Montagnani; Jonathan Good; Gina Gershon; Jay Reso; Chuck Liddell; Luke Rockhold; Elijah Baker
- Cinematography: Mark Dobrescu
- Production companies: Trilight Entertainment; Anamorphic Media; Woolfcub Productions
- Distributed by: Princ Films
- Release dates: May 16, 2020 (FITE TV); October 9, 2020 (United States)
- Running time: 98 minutes
- Countries: United States; United Kingdom
- Language: English

Cagefighter: Worlds Collide is a 2020 British-American martial arts sports film written and directed by Jesse Quinones. Starring Alex Montagnani, Jonathan Good, Gina Gershon, Jay Reso, and Chuck Liddell, the film follows a successful MMA champion who agrees to defend his championship against a professional wrestler. It premiered digitally via streaming service FITE TV on May 16, 2020, and was released in the United States in October 9.

== Plot ==
Reiss Gibbons is the greatest fighter to ever participate in the MMA promotion Legends. He is a 5-time champion and has just come off a win which has him and his manager Reggie (Elijah Baker) feeling on top of the world with waves of endorsement deals and movie offers. Legends owner Max Black (Gina Gershon) wants to book another fight for Reiss where she reveals to MMA talk show host Stephen Drake that she has decided to put Reiss against pro wrestling star Randy Stone (Jonathan Good).

Drake and the whole MMA community including Reiss and his wife Ellie think this is a publicity stunt and that Stone will not succeed like all wrestlers who transition to MMA too soon. The hype however attracts a large audience with professional wrestlers Matt Hardy, Tommy Dreamer, and Bubba Ray Dudley defending Stone and professional wrestling organisations claiming Stone will beat Reiss and prove everyone wrong. A press conference is held but ends in disaster when Stone's trash talk against Reiss and his wife angers Reiss and nearly starts a fight. The fight begins the next day and the two finally collide.

Reiss proves at first to be the better fighter due to his experience and techniques where as Stone throws wild punches and is too inexperienced. Much to everyone, including Reiss' shock, Stone proves to be tougher than he looks and Reiss' overconfidence and showboating gets the best of him. Stone is able to get Reiss up on the cage using dirty boxing techniques his trainer Danny Thickett (Leo Fafard) used in his heyday and easily picks Reiss up for takedowns. The match ends in a huge upset and after hitting Reiss with one punch, Stone delivers a devastating uppercut which knocks Reiss unconscious. Reiss awakens but is concussed and confuses the referee for Stone attempting to wrestle him. The referee stops him and informs the match is over and Stone has won the title.

Reiss is humiliated by the match with many of his fans now making memes of him crying during the loss and even having his movie deals revoked. Angry and wanting revenge, he makes Reggie ask Max for a rematch, but Max states she can't. Due to Stone having difficulty cutting weight for the Light-Heavyweight division, Max has moved him to the Heavyweight division instead to challenge for the title, but she offers Reiss to fight young and hungry newcomer Nightmare. Reggie along with Reiss' trainer and friend Marcus (Chuck Liddell) refuse the fight due to the danger of Nightmare's size and Reiss' impatience. Reiss decides to take the fight anyhow and abandons Marcus to train with LA trainer Tony Gunn (Luke Rockhold).

Training proves difficult, with little time to prepare and difficulty cutting weight Reiss ends up two pounds over the limit and has to forfeit 20% of his fight earnings for violating weight cut. The fight begins and Reiss loses again to Nightmare in a embarrassing manner angering Tony with the crowd and Stone who was in attendance during the fight laughing at Reiss for his lackluster fighting. Reiss decides to retire having his confidence destroyed and his desire to fight having been quashed.

He attempts to live peacefully with his wife but his bank accounts are in the red due to his frivolous spending, bad endorsement deals, and paying for Tony's training camp which he wasted losing the fight. Humiliated and at rock bottom, Reiss sells one of his championship belts to stay afloat. Reggie returns to offer another fight but Reiss declines having now become afraid to fight again and emotionally breaks down in front of his wife. Reggie tracks down Max where he begs for a rematch but Max again refuses, not wanting to waste money or damage Reiss' reputation any further. On Drake's podcast while being interviewed about who's going to fight Stone for the title after his opponent was forced to retire due to brain damage, Max gives in and says she will arrange a rematch for Reiss and Stone. Reiss and his camp are happy to hear this and after making amends with Marcus they start training again.

The rematch begins and Stone is dominant most of the fight, even tearing Reiss' groin during a failed triangle choke on the latter's part and swelling up Reiss’ left eye after performing an illegal headbutt. Refusing to give up and wanting to prove he's not afraid anymore and that he can still fight, Reiss holds out till the final round. He finally gains momentum when he catches Stone in a guillotine headlock leading to a rear-naked choke on the ground. Stone refuses to tap and Reiss won't let go resulting in Reiss winning the match after Stone passes out from the hold. Reiss is the new Heavyweight champion and he and Stone earn each other's respect with Stone offering to buy him a drink during their next rematch. Reiss celebrates with his wife and friends while Max gives an interview about Reiss' victory and future.

== Cast ==
- Alex Montagnani as Reiss Gibbons
- Jonathan Good as Randy Stone
- Gina Gershon as Max Black
- Jay Reso as Stephen Drake
- Chuck Liddell as Marcus
- Luke Rockhold as Tony Gunn
- Elijah Baker as Reggie
- Rigan Machado as himself
- Brad Pickett as himself
- Kwame Augustine as Jerome
- Linden Clark as Alex

== Production ==
In an interview with the Press Association in February 2018, Josh Herdman revealed that he was preparing for a role in the film, then tentatively known as simply Cagefighter. In January 2019, it was reported by Deadline Hollywood that Michael Jai White and Gina Gershon had been cast in the film, and that Herdman would play the lead role of Reiss. Jesse Quinones was attached to write and direct, while mixed martial artists Anderson Silva, Georges St-Pierre, Alexander Gustafsson, Dan Hardy, and Tyron Woodley were revealed to be making cameo appearances in the film. In May 2019, professional wrestler Jonathan Good (ring name "Jon Moxley") was cast in the film as the antagonist Randy Stone. Also in May, the film was picked up for distribution by Kaleidoscope Film Distribution. In October, Herdman and Jai White left the project and the role of Reiss was given to Alex Montagnani. Chuck Liddell, Luke Rockhold, and Jay "Christian" Reso were also cast in the film, with filming set to commence on November 1 in Regina, Saskatchewan. Filming finished on November 25, with additional scenes being shot in London on December 18.

== Release ==
On April 13, 2020, a teaser trailer for the film was released on YouTube. On April 15, FITE TV announced that the film would premiere live on the service on May 16, for all countries outside of the United States. The film was originally scheduled for a limited theatrical release, but this changed after movie theaters closed worldwide due to restrictions stemming from the COVID-19 pandemic. On October 1, 2020, it was announced that the film would be released via video on demand to customers in the United States on October 9.

== Critical reception ==
Steph Franchomme of VultureHound gave the film a rating of four-and-a-half stars out of five. He praised the performances of Liddell, Good and Gershon, and applauded the film's message: "Cagefighter: Worlds Collide is not only a movie for wrestling or MMA fans. It is made for any human being who believes in the fact everything is possible in life. You can be a Champion in a ring or a cage, the essential is for you to be the Champion of your own life."
