= Jon Moxley =

American professional wrestler (born 1985)

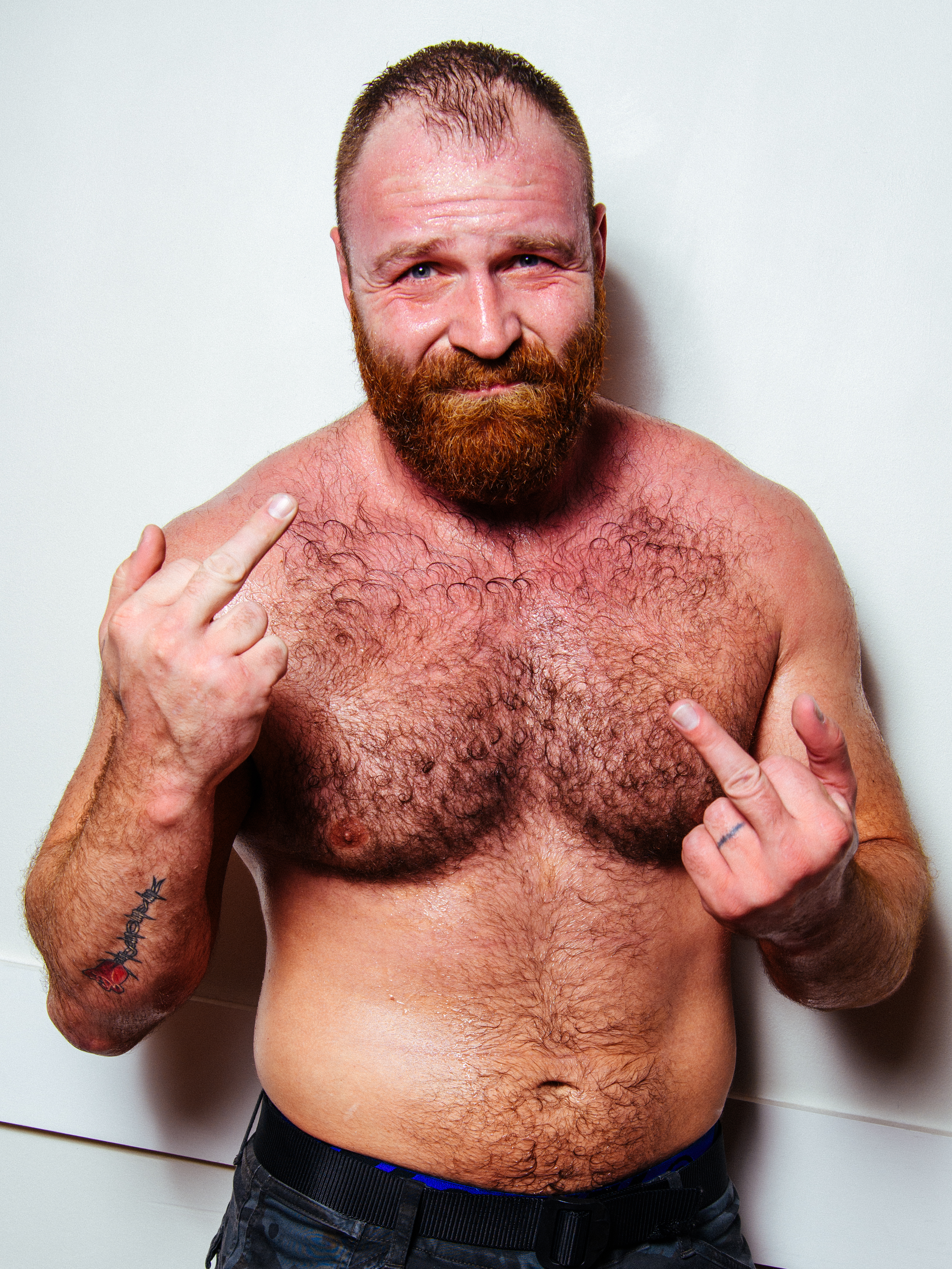
- Moxley in 2021

Personal information
- Born: Jonathan David Good; December 7, 1985 (age 40) Cincinnati, Ohio, U.S.
- Spouse: Renee Paquette (m. 2017)
- Children: 1

Professional wrestling career
- Ring name(s): Jon Moxley; Dean Ambrose; Jonathan Moxley; Moxley Moxx
- Billed height: 6 ft 4 in (193 cm)
- Billed weight: 225 lb (102 kg)
- Billed from: Cincinnati, Ohio
- Trained by: Cody Hawk; Les Thatcher
- Debut: June 20, 2004

Jonathan David Good (born December 7, 1985), better known by his ring name Jon Moxley, is an American professional wrestler. As of May 2019, he is signed to All Elite Wrestling (AEW), where he is the current AEW Continental Champion in his first reign and the leader of the Death Riders stable. He has also made appearances for New Japan Pro-Wrestling (NJPW). (Note: When wrestling for New Japan Pro-Wrestling, his ring name is written in katakana as ジョン・モクスリー (Jon Mokusurī).)

Good made his professional wrestling debut in 2004, and competed as Jon Moxley in several independent promotions such as Heartland Wrestling Association (HWA), Westside Xtreme Wrestling (wXw), Full Impact Pro (FIP), Combat Zone Wrestling (CZW), and Dragon Gate USA (DGUSA). Upon signing with WWE in 2011, he was renamed Dean Ambrose and began competing in the company's developmental territories of Florida Championship Wrestling (FCW) and NXT, before joining the main roster in November 2012 as a member of The Shield alongside Roman Reigns and Seth Rollins. Ambrose won the WWE United States Championship, his first championship in WWE, in May 2013; his 351-day reign became the longest United States Championship reign since the title came under WWE's ownership (breaking the record previously held by Montel Vontavious Porter). After widespread success, The Shield split in June 2014. Ambrose went on to win the WWE Championship once, the WWE Intercontinental Championship three times, and the WWE Raw Tag Team Championship (Note: During his first reign, the title was called the WWE Tag Team Championship.) twice (both times with Rollins), which made him WWE's 27th Triple Crown Champion and 16th Grand Slam Champion. He also won the Money in the Bank ladder match in 2016.

Upon leaving WWE in April 2019, Good reverted to his Jon Moxley character and made his surprise debut the following month for AEW in May 2019. He started wrestling for NJPW in June 2019 and won the IWGP United States Heavyweight Championship in his debut, holding the championship twice in total and subsequently setting the record for the longest reign in the championship's history. He has won the AEW World Championship four times, setting records for the most world championship wins and longest cumulative reigns in AEW history, the AEW International Championship once, the AEW Continental Championship once, and the 2025 Continental Classic tournament. Additionally, he is a one-time IWGP Heavyweight Championship in NJPW, and has headlined the most AEW pay-per-view events company history. Good is a six-time world champion across WWE, AEW and NJPW.

Good has sporadically ventured into acting, most notably starring in the films 12 Rounds 3: Lockdown (2015) and Cagefighter: Worlds Collide (2020).

== Early life ==
Jonathan David Good was born in Cincinnati on December 7, 1985. His mother worked night shifts stocking shelves at a ThriftWay store and his father worked two jobs; he first ran a machine on the shop floor of a plastics factory and was later promoted to an office job, which required him to relocate, but Good's mother did not want to move and thus raised Good and his sister alone. He grew up in Cincinnati's East End, which he later described as so deprived that shoplifting essential items was a daily occurrence for everybody he knew. He said, "Our neighborhood was just a big swath of crappy apartment buildings in varying states of decay [but] I honestly don't think I'd have rather grown up anywhere else. We played football in the street, rode bikes, etc. We didn't spend any time indoors. Nobody had anywhere nice to go back to anyway."

An avid fan of professional wrestling who idolized Bret Hart, Good used wrestling as an escape from his rough upbringing by watching videos and reading stories about wrestling's earlier days. He attended Amelia High School in nearby Batavia, but dropped out one year after beginning to train as a wrestler. He supported himself by working minimum-wage jobs in factories, restaurants, and warehouses, but was constantly getting fired because he would skip work if he was booked to wrestle a match that clashed with his job; however, he continued to do so because he knew he "could always find another minimum-wage job". He often used drugs such as cocaine as a teenager, during which time he was also arrested multiple times for shoplifting. He has said that he would have most likely become a forest firefighter if he did not pursue wrestling.

== Professional wrestling career ==
=== Heartland Wrestling Association (2004–2011) ===
Good began working for Les Thatcher in the Heartland Wrestling Association (HWA) promotion as a teenager by selling popcorn and setting up the ring. He began training to become a professional wrestler at the age of 18 under the teaching of Thatcher and HWA wrestler Cody Hawk. He made his debut in 2004 under the ring name Jon Moxley. The following year, Moxley won the HWA Tag Team Championship twice, with Jimmy Turner and Ric Byrne respectively. He captured the HWA Heavyweight Championship twice in 2006 by defeating Pepper Parks on both occasions but lost the title to Chad Collyer and Brian Jennings respectively. From mid-2007 to early 2010, Moxley continued to work in the tag team division and held the HWA tag titles once with his trainer Cody Hawk and twice with King Vu. He won the HWA Heavyweight Championship for the third time from Aaron Williams in January 2010, before losing it to Gerome Phillips six months later.

=== Independent circuit (2006–2011) ===
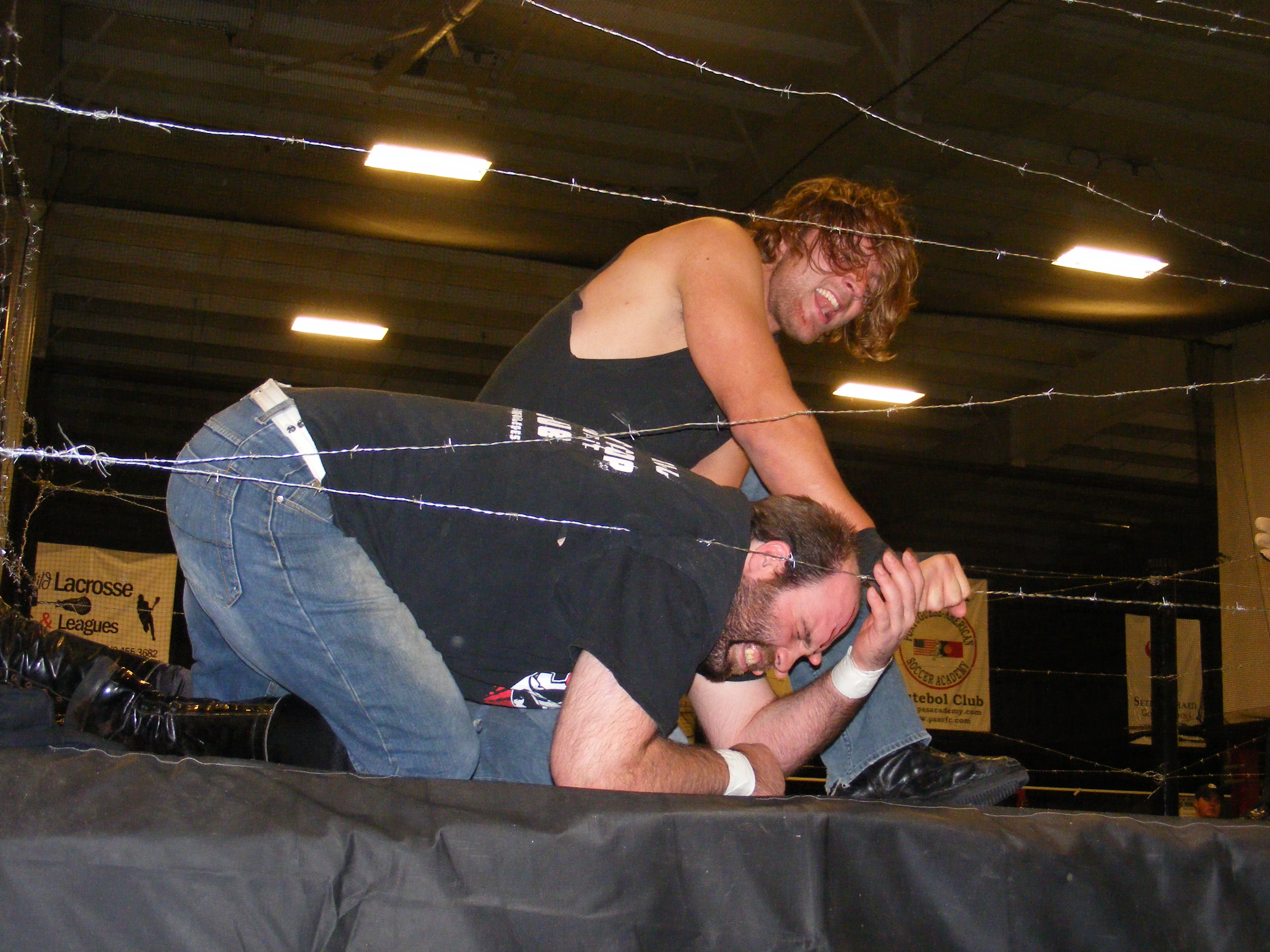
Moxley and Nick Gage in a barbed wire deathmatch in October 2010

In September 2006, Moxley teamed with Hade Vansen to win the IWA World Tag Team Championship in the Puerto Rico-based International Wrestling Association. They lost the titles to Chicano and Jeff Jeffrey in November, ending their reign at 69 days. Moxley wrestled a match in WWE in January 2007 losing to Val Venis. Moxley also wrestled several dark matches for Ring of Honor (ROH) between 2007 and 2009. Moxley started working for Dragon Gate USA (DGUSA) in late 2009. He made his first televised appearance in March, where he defeated Tommy Dreamer in a hardcore match taped for the Mercury Rising pay-per-view. At the Uprising event in Mississauga, Ontario, Canada, Moxley suffered a legitimate injury where his left nipple was nearly severed during a match with Jimmy Jacobs. His last match in DGUSA was against Homicide in January 2011, which Moxley won.

At Full Impact Pro's (FIP) Southern Stampede event on April 17, 2010, Moxley defeated Roderick Strong to win the vacant FIP World Heavyweight Championship. He held the title for 441 days before relinquishing it in July 2011, due to his signing with WWE. Moxley also won Combat Zone Wrestling's CZW World Heavyweight Championship twice in 2010 by defeating B-Boy and Nick Gage, respectively.

=== World Wrestling Entertainment / WWE (2006-2007, 2011–2019) ===
==== Developmental territories (2011–2012) ====
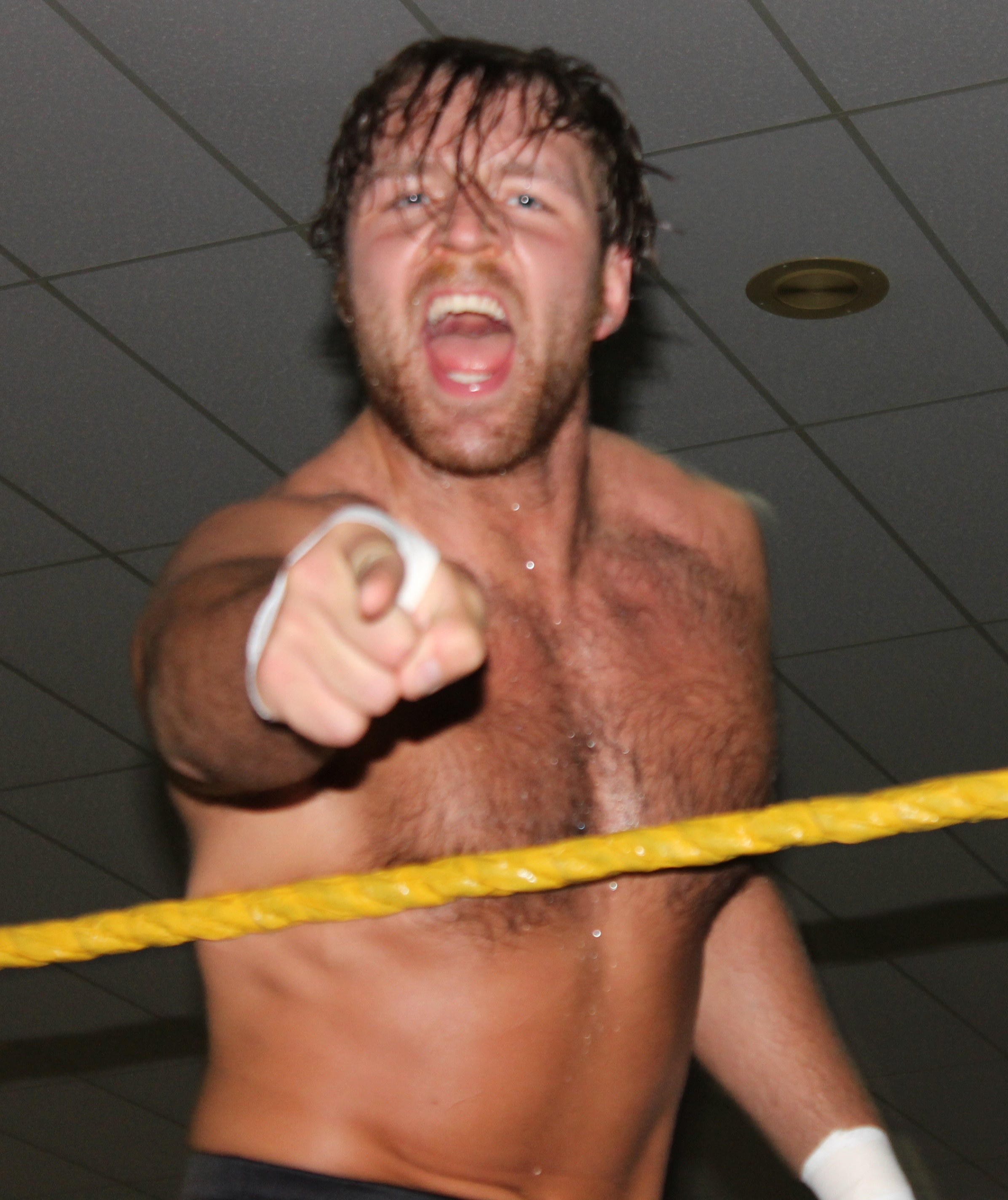
Ambrose at an NXT event in October 2012

Good signed a developmental deal with WWE in April 2011 and joined its developmental territory Florida Championship Wrestling (FCW) under the name Dean Ambrose. Prior to his signing, Good wrestled three try-out matches for WWE in 2006 and 2007 and jobbed alongside Dick Rick against The Big Show in a handicap match on Heat in January 2006. He lost to Val Venis on Heat in January 2007 with pink hair.

Ambrose would feud with FCW Jack Brisco 15 Champion Seth Rollins, facing him in a 20-minute non-title Iron Man match that ended in a draw with neither man scoring a fall. A 30-minute rematch, in which the title was on the line, took place in September which Rollins won through sudden death rules. Ambrose beat Rollins in a non-title match in the first round of a tournament to crown the new FCW Florida Heavyweight Champion. and costed him the FCW 15 Championship by attacking Damien Sandow during his title match with Rollins, causing a disqualification in the deciding fall. At an FCW house show on October 21, Ambrose challenged WWE wrestler CM Punk, who was making a guest appearance, to a match in which Ambrose was defeated.

Ambrose then began a feud with WWE wrestler William Regal. being defeated on the November 7 episode of FCW. In March 2012, Ambrose had a confrontation with veteran hardcore wrestler Mick Foley. Ambrose continued to antagonize Foley through Twitter. According to Ambrose, the angle was supposed to culminate in a match between the two, but this never came to fruition due to Foley not being medically allowed to wrestle. Almost a year after their first match, Ambrose and Regal rematched on the final episode of FCW on July 15. The match would conclude in a no contest after Ambrose repeatedly kneed Regal's head into a ring turnbuckle, causing Regal to bleed from the ear.

==== The Shield (2012–2014) ====
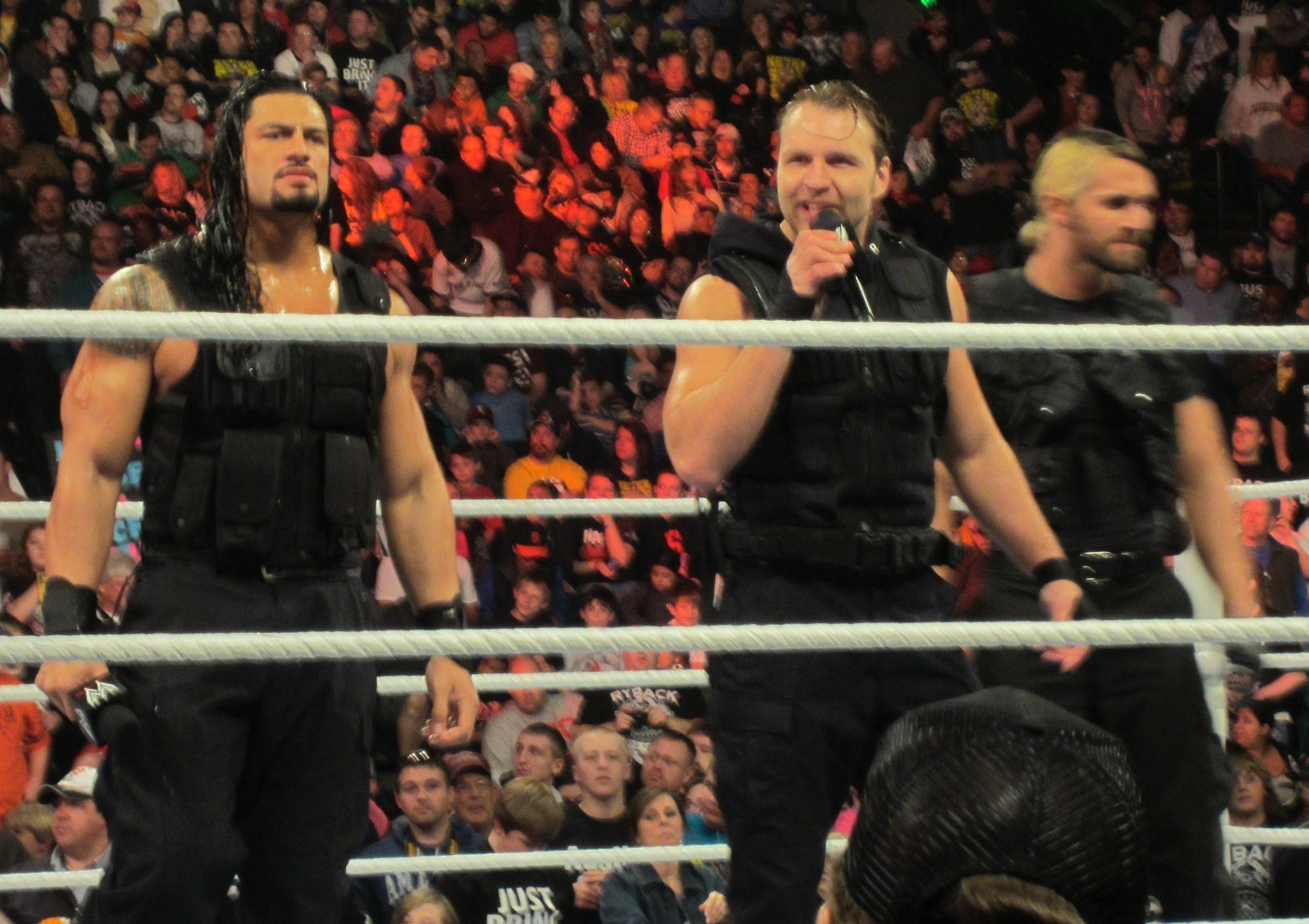
Ambrose (center) as a member of The Shield in February 2013

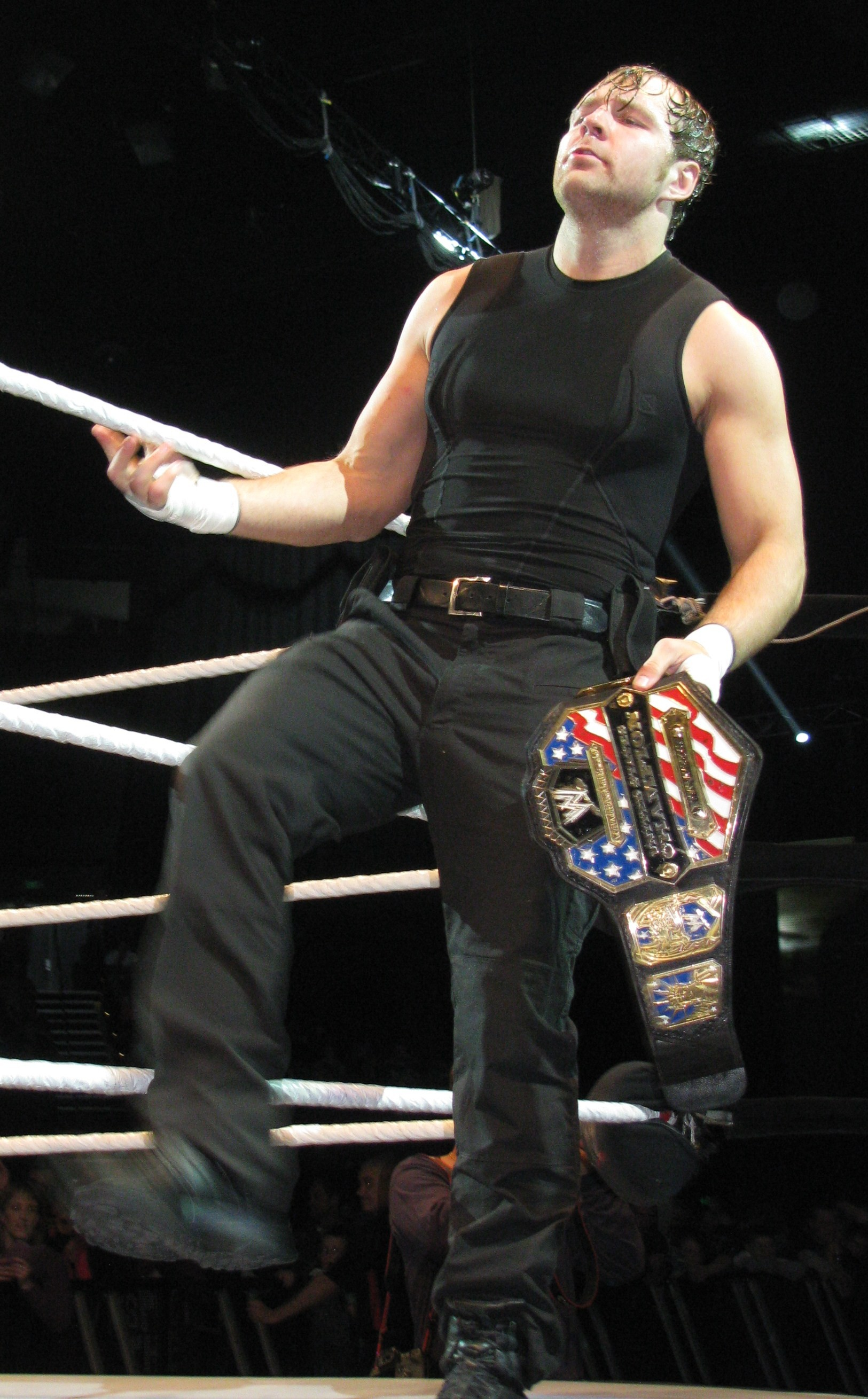
Ambrose as the WWE United States Champion in July 2013

On November 18, 2012, Dean Ambrose made his WWE main roster debut at the Survivor Series pay-per-view event alongside Roman Reigns and Seth Rollins, as they delivered a triple powerbomb through an announce table to Ryback during the triple threat main event for the WWE Championship, allowing CM Punk to pin John Cena and retain the title. The trio declared themselves The Shield, worked as villains and allied with CM Punk, helping him to retain the title. They made their debut as wrestlers at TLC: Tables, Ladders & Chairs in a six-man Tables, Ladders, and Chairs match.

They kept winning six-man matches at events like Elimination Chamber and WrestleMania 29. Ambrose also worked as singles wrestler, making his debut against The Undertaker on the April 26 episode of SmackDown, which he lost by submission, and won the United States Championship at Extreme Rules when he defeated Kofi Kingston. He would successfully defend the title in the following weeks with the help of Reigns and Rollins. On the June 14 episode of SmackDown, The Shield was given their first decisive loss, against Randy Orton and Team Hell No, when Daniel Bryan made Rollins submit. Ambrose made his first pay-per-view defense of the United States Championship at Payback on June 16, where he defeated Kane by countout. The following month at Money in the Bank on July 14, he competed in the World Heavyweight Championship Money in the Bank ladder match but failed to win despite interference from Reigns and Rollins. In August, The Shield allied themselves with Triple H and joined his group The Authority.

Ambrose continued to retain his United States Championship against Rob Van Dam at SummerSlam on August 18, Dolph Ziggler at Night of Champions on September 15, and Big E Langston at Hell in a Cell on October 27. At the Survivor Series pay-per-view on November 24, The Shield teamed with Antonio Cesaro and Jack Swagger to take on Rey Mysterio, The Usos, Cody Rhodes and Goldust in a traditional Survivor Series match; although Ambrose was the first man eliminated, Reigns would ultimately win the match for the team. At TLC: Tables, Ladders & Chairs on December 15, CM Punk defeated The Shield in a handicap match after Ambrose was accidentally speared by Reigns. At the Royal Rumble on January 26, 2014, Ambrose entered his first Royal Rumble match at number 11 and eliminated three participants, before being eliminated by Reigns. The following night on Raw, The Shield faced Daniel Bryan, John Cena, and Sheamus in order to earn their spot in the Elimination Chamber match for the WWE World Heavyweight Championship. The Shield lost after The Wyatt Family (Bray Wyatt, Erick Rowan, and Luke Harper) interfered, thus starting a feud between the two factions. The Shield would lose to The Wyatt Family at the Elimination Chamber pay-per-view on February 23, due to Ambrose abandoning his teammates midway through.

After their feud with The Wyatt Family, The Shield moved on to a rivalry with Kane, turning into heroic characters in the process. The group defeated Kane and the New Age Outlaws (Road Dogg and Billy Gunn) at WrestleMania XXX on April 6. The feud with Kane also prompted The Shield to cease working for Triple H, who reformed Evolution with himself, Batista and Randy Orton to battle them. On April 28, Ambrose surpassed MVP as the longest-reigning United States Champion under the WWE banner. The Shield defeated Evolution in a six-man tag team match at Extreme Rules on May 4. The following night on Raw, Triple H forced Ambrose to defend his United States Championship in a 20-man battle royal, which saw Ambrose surviving until the final two before ultimately being eliminated by Sheamus, thus ending his title reign at 351 days. The Shield once again defeated Evolution at Payback on June 1 in a No Holds Barred elimination match. The following night on Raw, Rollins betrayed Ambrose and Reigns and aligned himself with The Authority, breaking up the group.

==== Feuds with Seth Rollins and Bray Wyatt (2014–2015) ====
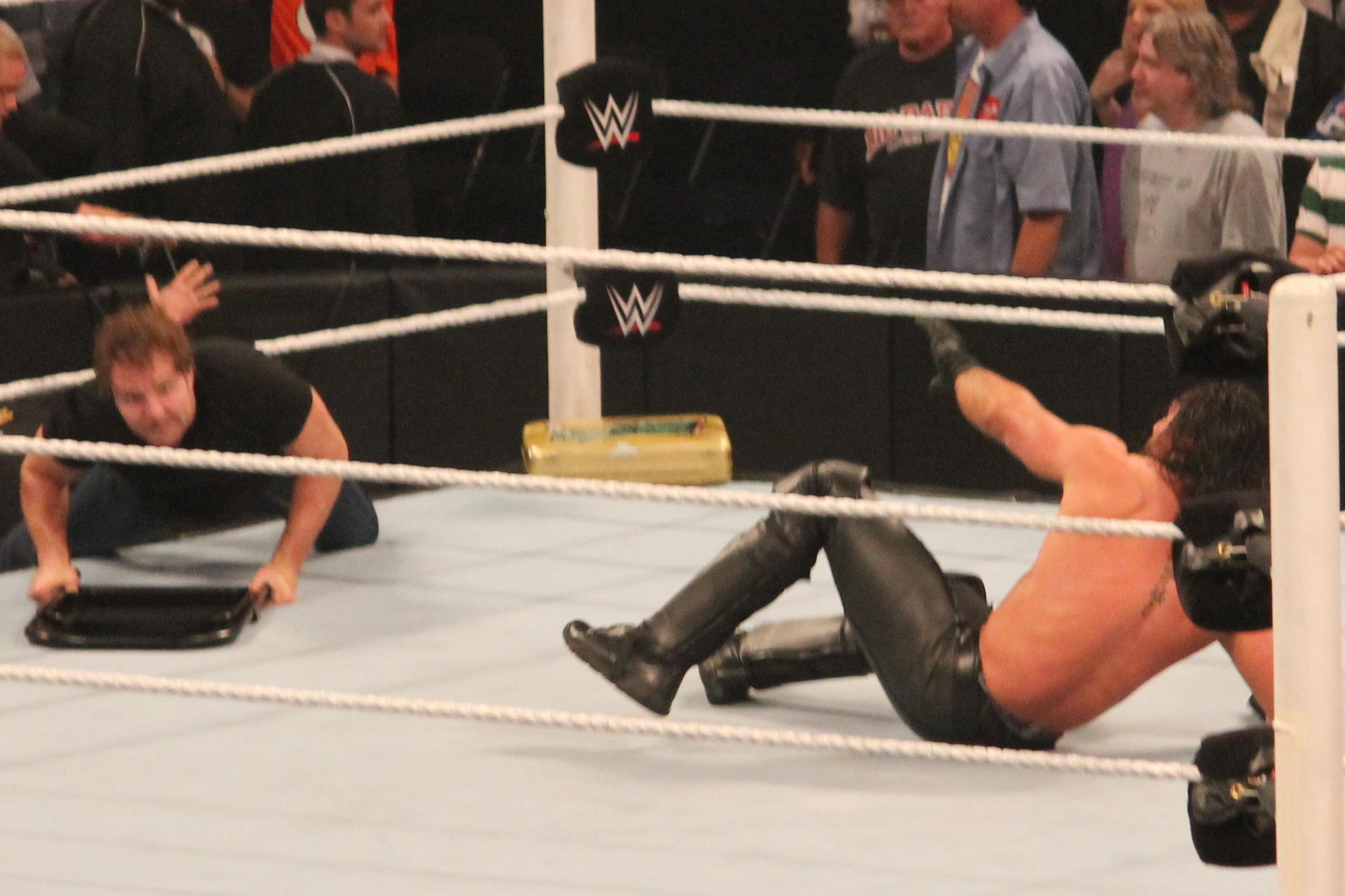
After The Shield's split in June 2014, Ambrose began a prolonged feud with Seth Rollins

Ambrose promptly began feuding with Rollins, which included the duo interfering in each other's matches. During this period, Ambrose and Reigns amicably separated as a team, with Ambrose debuting new ring attire and new entrance music. They collided at Money in the Bank and Battleground until they face each other at SummerSlam in a lumberjack match, which Ambrose lost. The following night on Raw, Ambrose faced Rollins in a Falls Count Anywhere match, which Ambrose lost. After the match, Rollins curb stomped his head through cinder blocks, giving Ambrose kayfabe (fictional) "head and spine trauma" and causing him to take a hiatus from WWE. After his return at Night of Champions, the duo wrestled again in a Hell in a Cell match at Hell in a Cell, where Ambrose lost again when the returning Bray Wyatt interfered and attacked him.

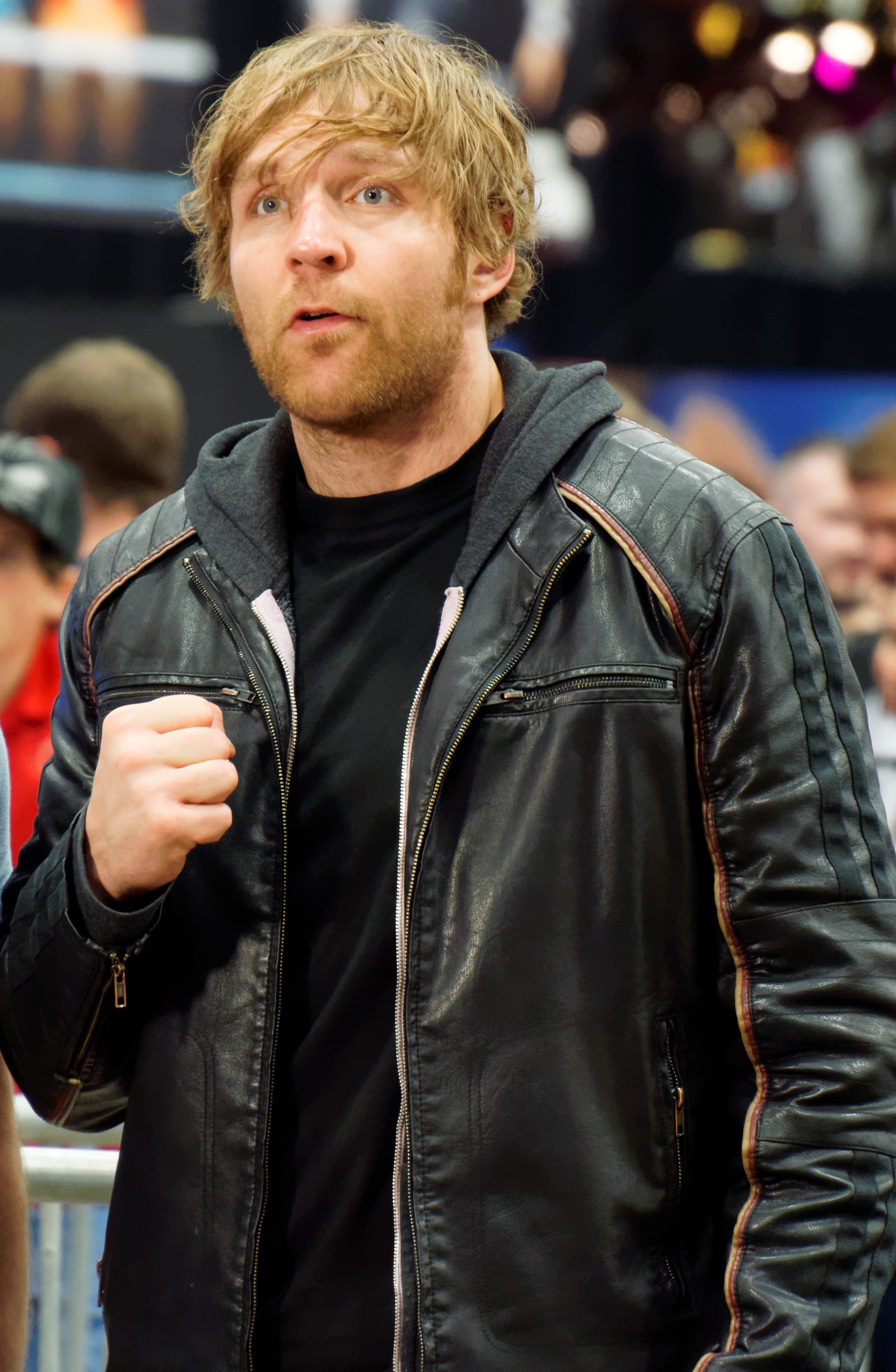
Ambrose in 2016

After consecutive losses to Wyatt at Survivor Series on November 23 and TLC: Tables, Ladders & Chairs on December 14, Ambrose defeated Wyatt in a Boot Camp Match at Tribute to the Troops, before losing to Wyatt yet again in a Miracle on 34th Street Fight on the December 22 episode of Raw. The feud between the two concluded when Wyatt defeated Ambrose in an ambulance match on the January 5, 2015, episode of Raw. He failed to win the WWE Intercontinental Championship from Wade Barrett at Fastlane on February 22 and WrestleMania 31 on March 29.

Ambrose returned to feud with Rollins over the WWE World Heavyweight Championship, wrestling for the title at Payback, Elimination Chamber and Money in the Bank, but he didn't win the title. After Money in the Bank, Ambrose feuded again with Wyatt, facing him in multi-man matches at SummerSlam and Night of Champions. He also participated in a tournament for the vacant WWE World Heavyweight Championship, but was defeated in the finals at Survivor Series by Reigns.

==== Championship reigns (2015–2017) ====
"Crowd was more into Ambrose than [Roman] Reigns... Why does Ambrose continue to do more jobs when he's the most over babyface they have?"

— Wrestling Observer Newsletter writer Jeff Hamlin on Ambrose's recent losses in relation to his popularity with WWE audiences

In December, Ambrose won the Intercontinental Championship for the first time after defeating Owens at TLC: Tables, Ladders & Chairs. He successfully defended the title against Owens and Ziggler multiple times between December and January 2016. Ambrose competed in the 2016 Royal Rumble match for the WWE World Heavyweight Championship, which he lost after being lastly eliminated by eventual winner Triple H. Ambrose would later lose the Intercontinental Championship back to Owens in a five-way match on the February 15 episode of Raw, after Owens pinned Tyler Breeze.

At Fastlane on February 21, Ambrose faced Reigns and Brock Lesnar in a triple threat match to determine the number one contender for the WWE World Heavyweight Championship at WrestleMania 32, but lost after he was pinned by Reigns. The following night on Raw, Ambrose challenged Lesnar to a No Holds Barred street fight match at WrestleMania 32, which Paul Heyman accepted on Lesnar's behalf. He then failed to capture the WWE World Heavyweight Championship from Triple H at the Roadblock event in March. He was also unsuccessful in defeating Lesnar at WrestleMania 32. Following WrestleMania, Ambrose began a rivalry with Chris Jericho. He defeated Jericho at Payback, and again at Extreme Rules in an Asylum match later that month to end the feud.

"To this point, Ambrose had lost almost every big match he has been in with Rollins, Wyatt, Reigns, Triple H and Lesnar all getting their hands raised at the end ... We already knew that Dean Ambrose had the ability to be the biggest star of The Shield. Maybe now, especially in light of recent news, he will be."

— Wrestling Observer Newsletter writer Steve Khan on Ambrose's WWE World Heavyweight title cash-in at Money in the Bank

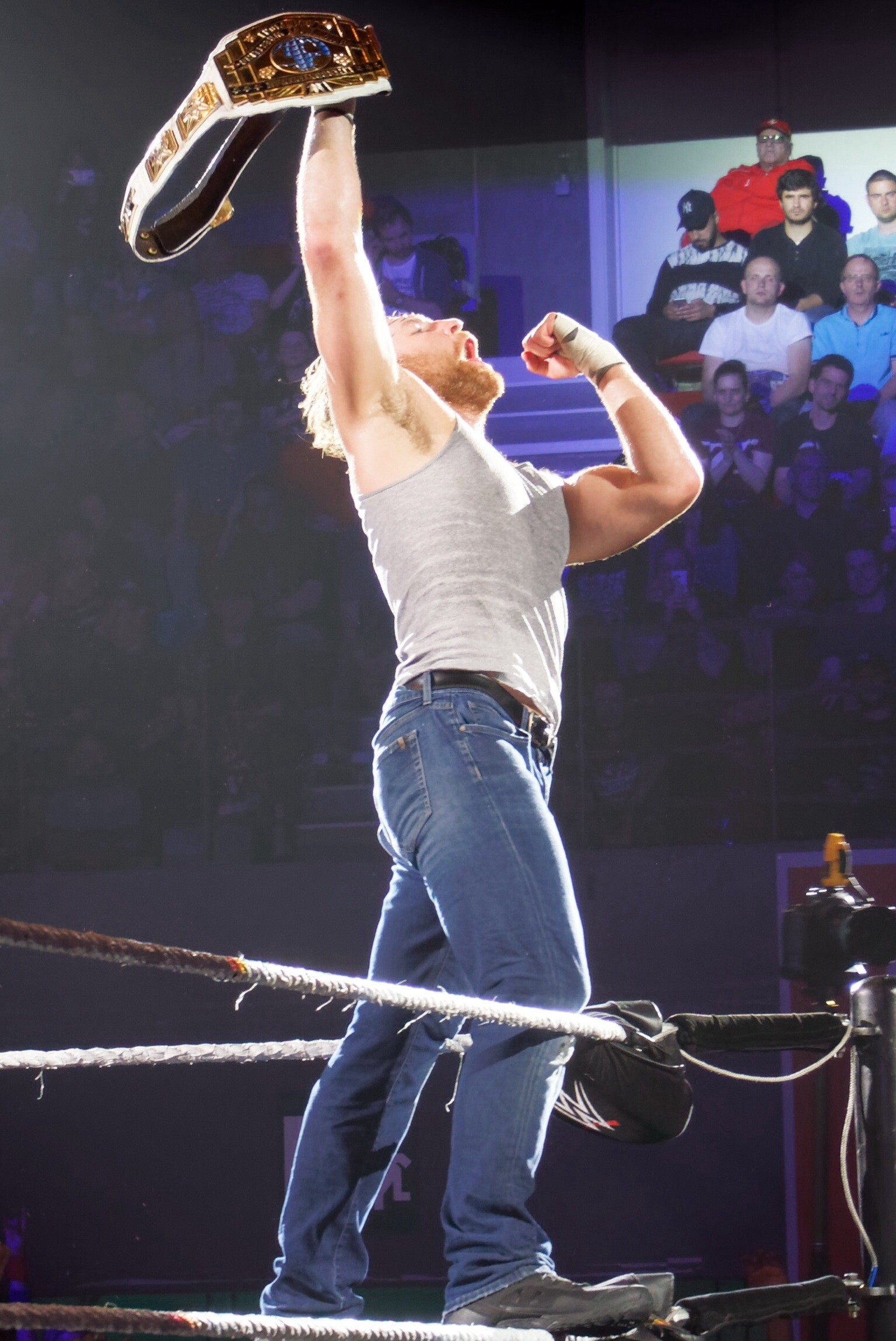
Ambrose as the WWE Intercontinental Champion in May 2017

In May, Ambrose qualified for the 2016 Money in the Bank ladder match, which he would win. Later that same night, he would cash in his Money in the Bank contract and defeat Rollins to win the WWE World Heavyweight Championship for the first time. Ambrose made his first title defense against Rollins on the July 18 episode of Raw, which ended in a draw after a double pinfall. The following night at the 2016 WWE draft, Ambrose was drafted to the SmackDown brand, being the brand's first draft pick and bringing the WWE Championship with him; that same night, he pinned Rollins to retain the championship. At Battleground, Ambrose retained his title against Reigns and Rollins after pinning Reigns. Ambrose then successfully defended the renamed "WWE World Championship" against Dolph Ziggler at SummerSlam in August.

At Backlash on September 11, he lost the title to AJ Styles after Styles performed a low blow and Styles Clash while the referee was incapacitated. Ambrose was unsuccessful in regaining the championship at No Mercy on October 9 in a triple threat match also involving John Cena, who was pinned by Styles. The following month at Survivor Series, Ambrose made up part of Team SmackDown alongside Styles, Bray Wyatt, Randy Orton and Shane McMahon in a winning effort over Team Raw. He would face Styles once again in a Tables, Ladders, and Chairs match at TLC: Tables, Ladders & Chairs for the WWE title. During the match, James Ellsworth interfered and pushed Ambrose off a ladder through multiple tables, allowing Styles to retain the title. Ambrose would then fail to become the number one contender for the reverted WWE Championship in a fatal four-way elimination match involving Dolph Ziggler, Luke Harper, and The Miz.

On the January 3, 2017, episode of SmackDown, Ambrose defeated The Miz to win the Intercontinental Championship for the second time. He participated in the 2017 Royal Rumble match in which he lasted almost 27 minutes before being eliminated by Brock Lesnar. On February 12, Ambrose took part in the WWE Championship Elimination Chamber match at the event of the same name, where he eliminated Baron Corbin with a roll-up pin only for Corbin to attack him afterward, allowing Miz to eliminate Ambrose. A match was set between Ambrose and Corbin at the WrestleMania 33 pre-show on April 2, where Ambrose retained his Intercontinental Championship. Two nights later on SmackDown, Ambrose wrestled in his final match for the brand, in a losing effort to Corbin in a non-title match. Following that, Ambrose was moved to the Raw brand as a result of the Superstar Shake-up. He would then continue his feud with The Miz, who was also drafted to Raw in the Superstar Shake-up, eventually losing the Intercontinental title to him at Extreme Rules in June, thus ending his reign at 152 days. Ambrose continued to feud with The Miz, leading up to a rematch for the Intercontinental Championship at Great Balls of Fire on July 9, where he lost as a result of interference by The Miztourage (Curtis Axel and Bo Dallas).

==== The Shield reunion and injury (2017–2018) ====
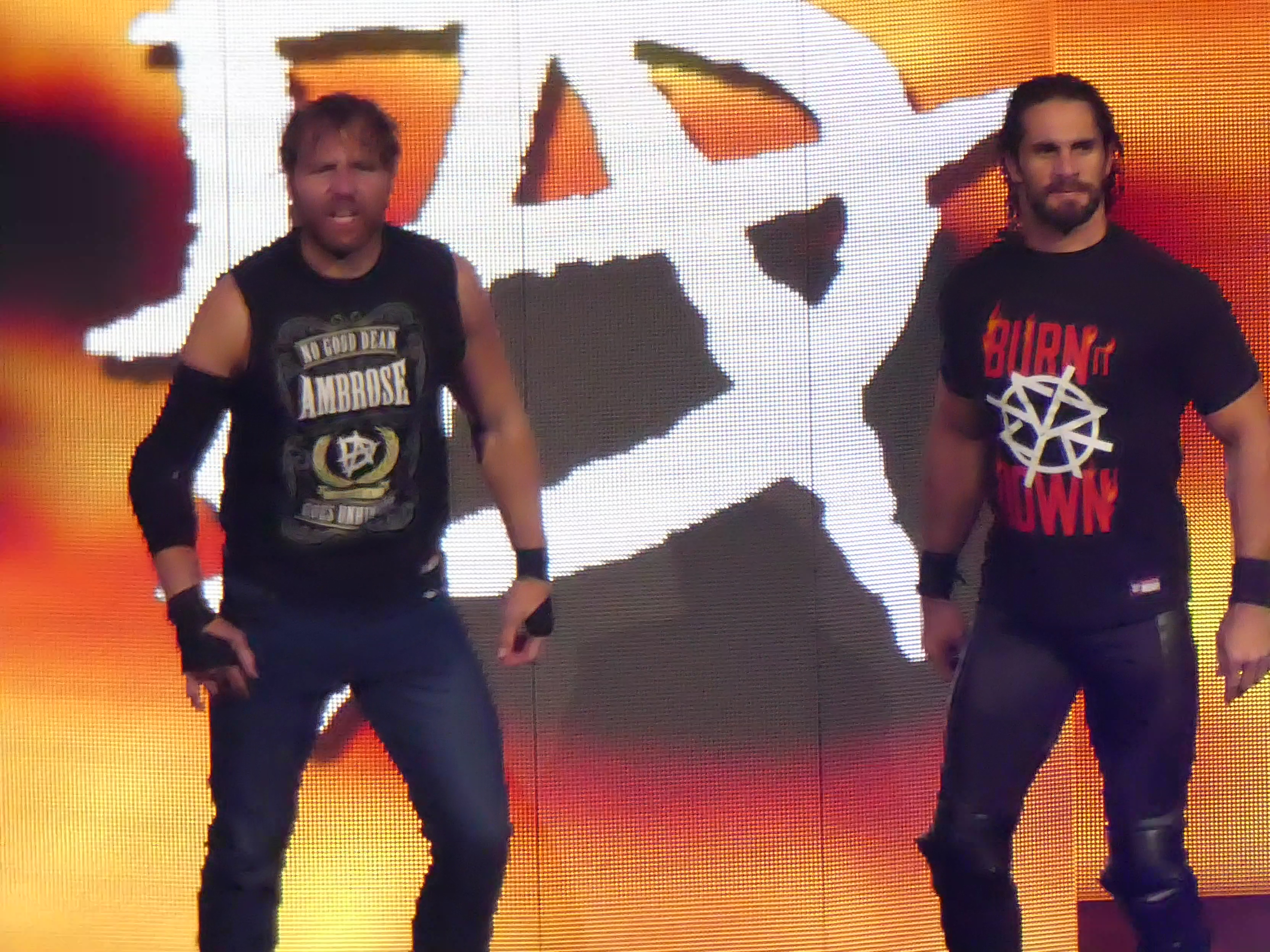
Ambrose and Rollins in December 2017

On the July 10 episode of Raw, Seth Rollins saved Ambrose from an attack by The Miz and The Miztourage. After Rollins failed to gain Ambrose's trust for several weeks, the two argued in the ring on the August 14 episode of Raw and eventually brawled with each other before fighting off Cesaro and Sheamus and reuniting the team. At SummerSlam on August 20, Ambrose and Rollins defeated Cesaro and Sheamus to win the WWE Raw Tag Team Championship, making Ambrose both a Triple Crown and Grand Slam champion in the process. Ambrose and Rollins successfully defended the titles against Cesaro and Sheamus at No Mercy, after Ambrose pinned Sheamus.

On the October 9 episode of Raw, Ambrose and Rollins reunited with Roman Reigns. The newly reformed Shield was due to face the team of Braun Strowman, Cesaro, Kane, The Miz and Sheamus at TLC: Tables, Ladders & Chairs in a 5-on-3 handicap Tables, Ladders and Chairs match, but Reigns was replaced by Kurt Angle over an illness concern. Ambrose, Rollins, and Angle would go on to win the match. Ambrose and Rollins were scheduled to face SmackDown Tag Team Champions The Usos in an interbrand match at Survivor Series, but lost the tag titles back to Cesaro and Sheamus on the November 6 episode of Raw after a distraction from SmackDown's The New Day (Big E, Kofi Kingston, and Xavier Woods), thus ending their reign at 78 days. This led to a match between The Shield and The New Day at Survivor Series two weeks later, which the former won. In December 2017, Ambrose suffered a triceps injury, reportedly rendering him out of action for nine months.

==== Final storylines and departure (2018–2019) ====
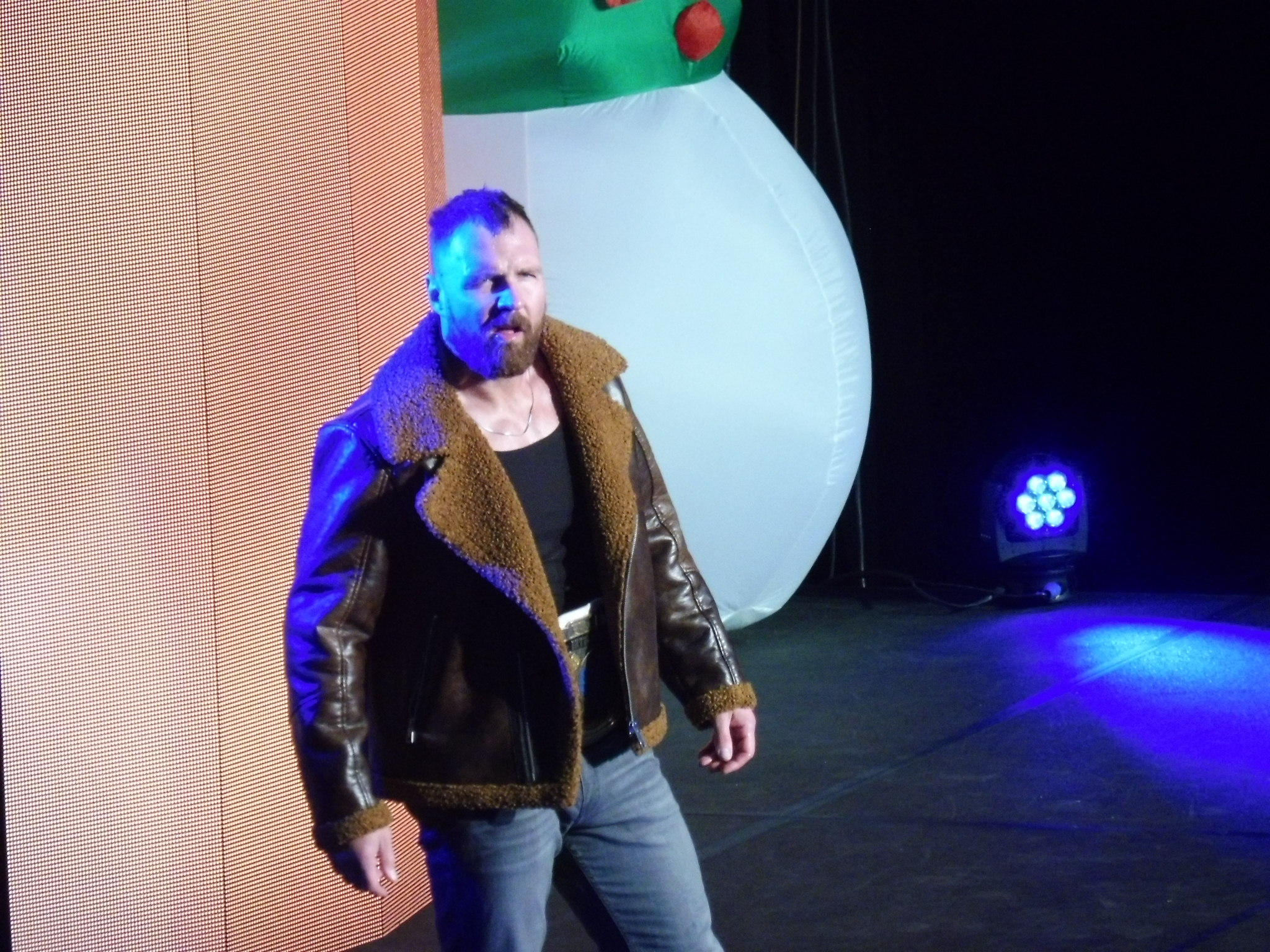
Ambrose sporting his new look in December 2018

On the August 13, 2018, episode of Raw, Ambrose returned with a new look consisting of short hair, a full beard, and a more muscular physique. He reunited with Rollins and Reigns, reuniting The Shield. In October, The Shield defeated Ziggler, McIntyre, and Strowman at Super Show-Down.

On the October 22 episode of Raw, after Reigns announced the return of his real-life leukemia and relinquished the Universal Championship, Ambrose and Rollins defeated Ziggler and McIntyre to capture the Raw Tag Team Championship for the second time. However, Ambrose immediately attacked Rollins after the match, losing the titles the next week.

Ambrose defeated Rollins at TLC: Tables, Ladders & Chairs in December to win the Intercontinental Championship, beginning his third reign with the title. Throughout the following weeks, he successfully defended his title against Tyler Breeze, Apollo Crews, and Rollins, before losing the championship to Bobby Lashley on the January 14, 2019, episode of Raw, in a triple threat match also involving Rollins, ending his reign at 29 days.

In February 2019, it was reported that Ambrose had informed WWE officials that he would not be renewing his contract and would be leaving WWE shortly after WrestleMania 35. WWE subsequently confirmed his decision in a statement. It was reported that he had been offered an improved contract by WWE, which he turned down due to long-standing frustration with the creative direction of his character and a particular dislike of the "hokey" material he had been given. In his final storylines with WWE, Ambrose re-joined the Shield as face, winning a six-man against Baron Corbin, Drew McIntyre and Bobby Lashley at Fastlane in March. His final contractual match occurred at a special event called The Shield's Final Chapter on April 21, where he, Reigns, and Rollins again defeated the team of Corbin, Lashley, and McIntyre. His contract expired on April 30.

On Chris Jericho's Talk is Jericho podcast in May 2019, Good explained his departure from WWE, where he spoke negatively of the "stupid" material his character was required to perform, highlighting a widely panned comedy segment in November 2018 where he received vaccinations to protect himself from the fans, believing this had irreversibly damaged his credibility. Good also recalled he had lost his passion for wrestling, and came to dread performing promos.

=== All Elite Wrestling / Ring of Honor (2019–present) ===
==== Feud with Kenny Omega and AEW World Champion (2019–2021) ====
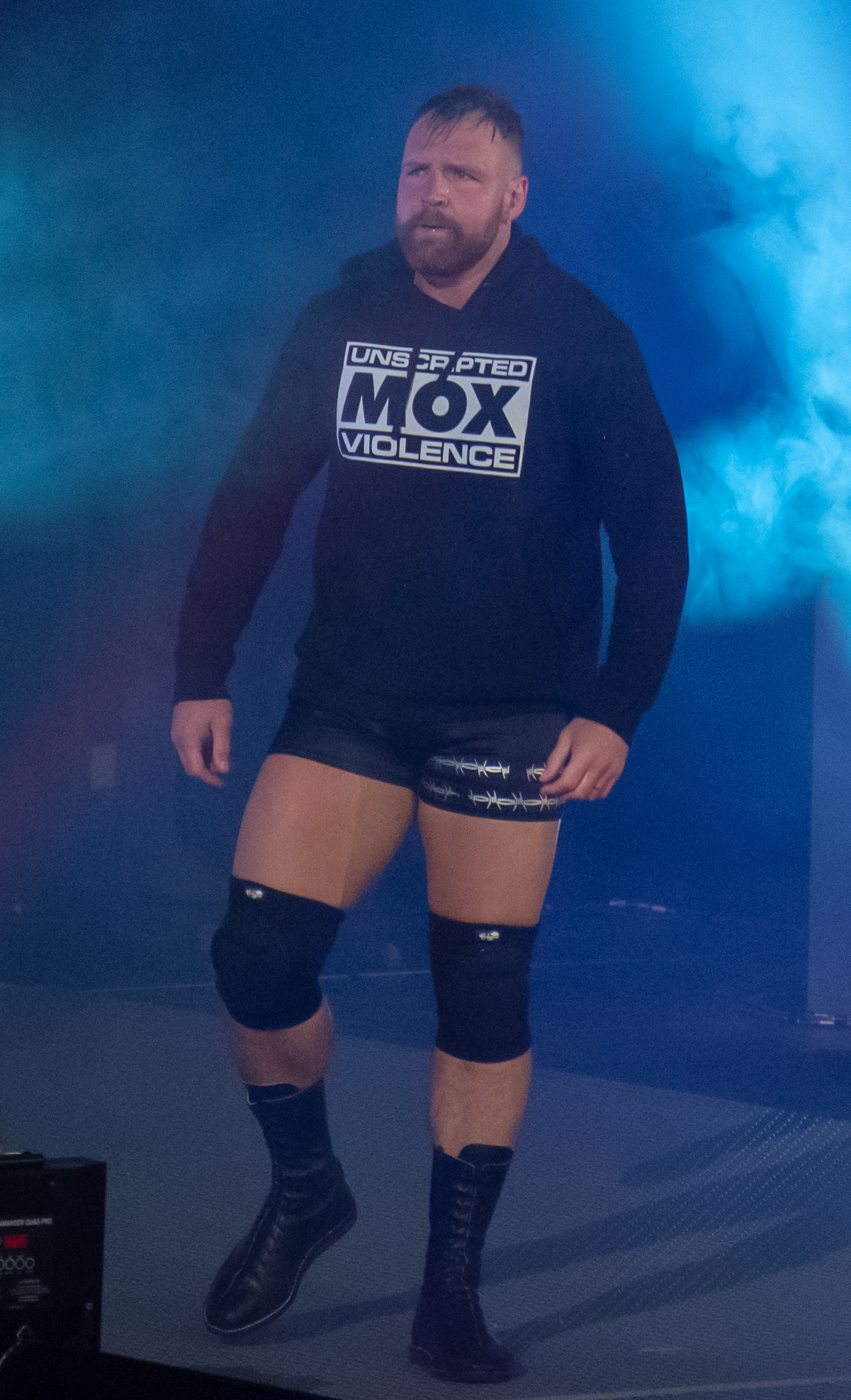
Moxley in October 2019

On May 1, Good—having reverted to his former Jon Moxley gimmick and name—posted a video on his Twitter account to promote the gimmick's return, which showed him breaking out of a prison. The video was created by wrestler-turned-filmmaker Nick Mondo. On May 25, Moxley made his unannounced debut for All Elite Wrestling (AEW) during Double or Nothing, AEW's inaugural event, attacking Chris Jericho, Kenny Omega, and the referee after Jericho and Omega's main event match, thus establishing himself as an antihero character. Shortly after, it was announced that Moxley had signed a multi-year contract. Moxley had his AEW debut match at the Fyter Fest event in June, where he defeated Joey Janela in an unsanctioned match. After the match, Moxley was attacked by Omega in retaliation for his previous assault. A match between the two was scheduled for All Out on August 31. However, a week before All Out, Moxley was forced to pull out after being diagnosed with a MRSA staph infection in his elbow, and would undergo surgery to remove it. AEW subsequently revealed Pac as Moxley's replacement, and the match was rescheduled for the Full Gear event. Moxley made his return on October 2, during the premiere episode of Dynamite, taking out Omega during the latter's main event match. In the main event of Full Gear on November 9, Moxley defeated Omega in an unsanctioned Lights Out match.

After Full Gear, Moxley indicated his intentions to challenge for the AEW World Championship. Moxley faced Chris Jericho for the championship at Revolution on February 29, 2020, where he won the title, becoming the first person to hold titles in AEW and NJPW simultaneously. Moxley defended the title against Mr. Brodie Lee at Double or Nothing on May 23, Brian Cage at Fight for the Fallen on July 15, and MJF at All Out on September 5.

Later that month, Moxley began a rivalry with Eddie Kingston. He defended the championship against Kingston on the September 23 episode of Dynamite, and at Full Gear on November 7, where Moxley defeated Kingston in an "I quit" match to retain the championship. Following this, Moxley rekindled his feud with Kenny Omega, losing the title at Winter Is Coming on December 2, thus ending his record-setting reign at 277 days, and giving Moxley his first singles loss in AEW. Moxley challenged Omega for the championship at Revolution on March 7, in an Exploding Barbed Wire Deathmatch, but lost.

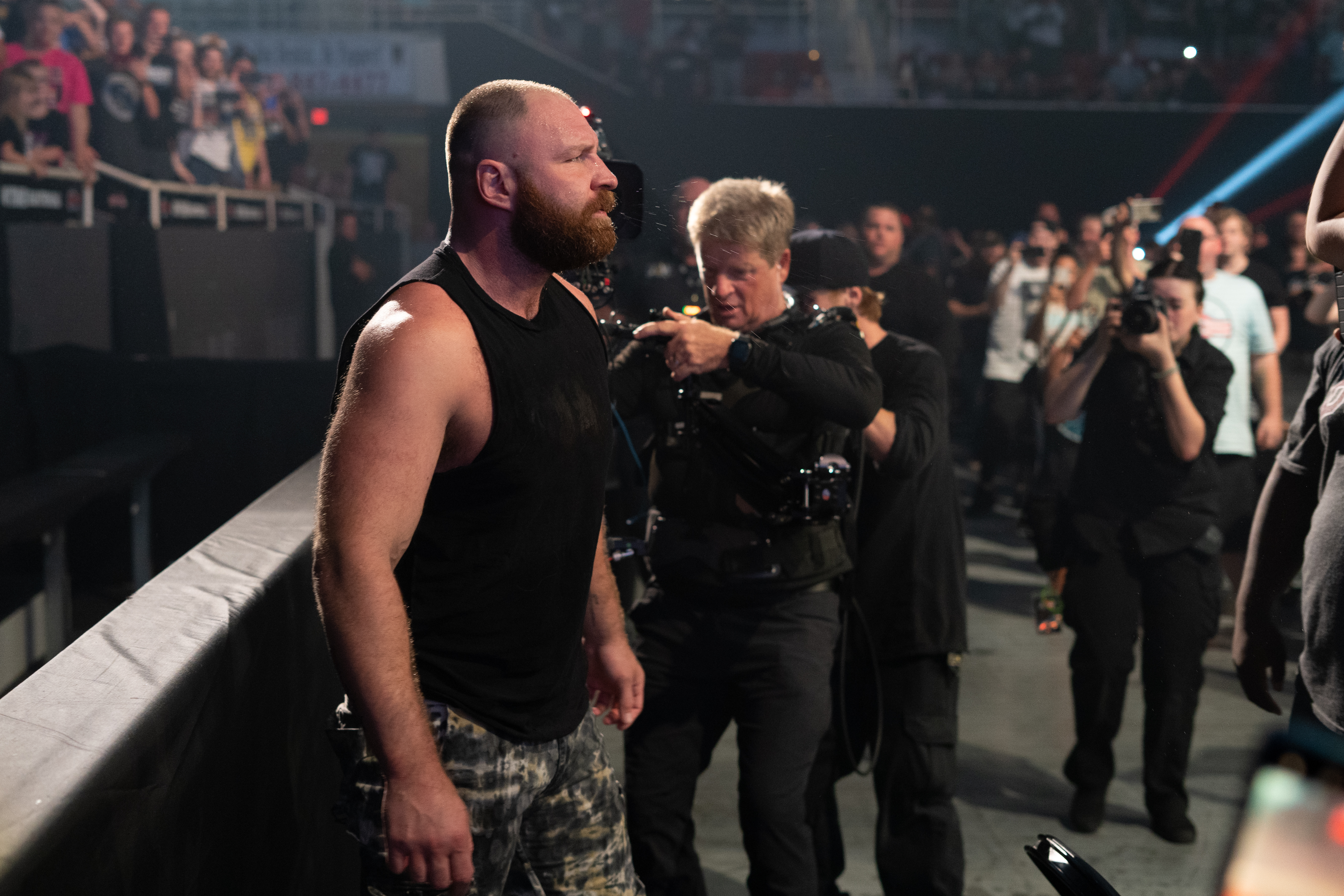
Moxley making his entrance in July 2021

After losing to Omega, Moxley began an alliance with Eddie Kingston, challenging The Young Bucks (Omega's friends) for the AEW World Tag Team Championship at the Double or Nothing event in May, but they were defeated. On October, he was inserted into a tournament to determine the next challenger for the world championship, but he was withdrawn from the tournament after it was revealed that he had entered a rehabilitation program for alcoholism.

==== Blackpool Combat Club (2022–2024) ====
Following rehab, Moxley returned in January 2022, beginning a storyline with Bryan Danielson. Moxley defeated Danielson at Revolution in March, after their match; William Regal, once a mentor to both men on separate occasions, made his surprise debut to break up the fight and force them to shake hands. With Regal as their manager, they formed a team which would later be named the Blackpool Combat Club (BCC), later including Wheeler Yuta and Claudio Castagnoli would join the Blackpool Combat Club as its newest member. At Double or Nothing on May 29, Moxley and Danielson teamed with Eddie Kingston, Santana and Ortiz to face the Jericho Appreciation Society (Chris Jericho, Jake Hager, Daniel Garcia, Angelo Parker, and Matt Menard) in an Anarchy in the Arena match, but lost.

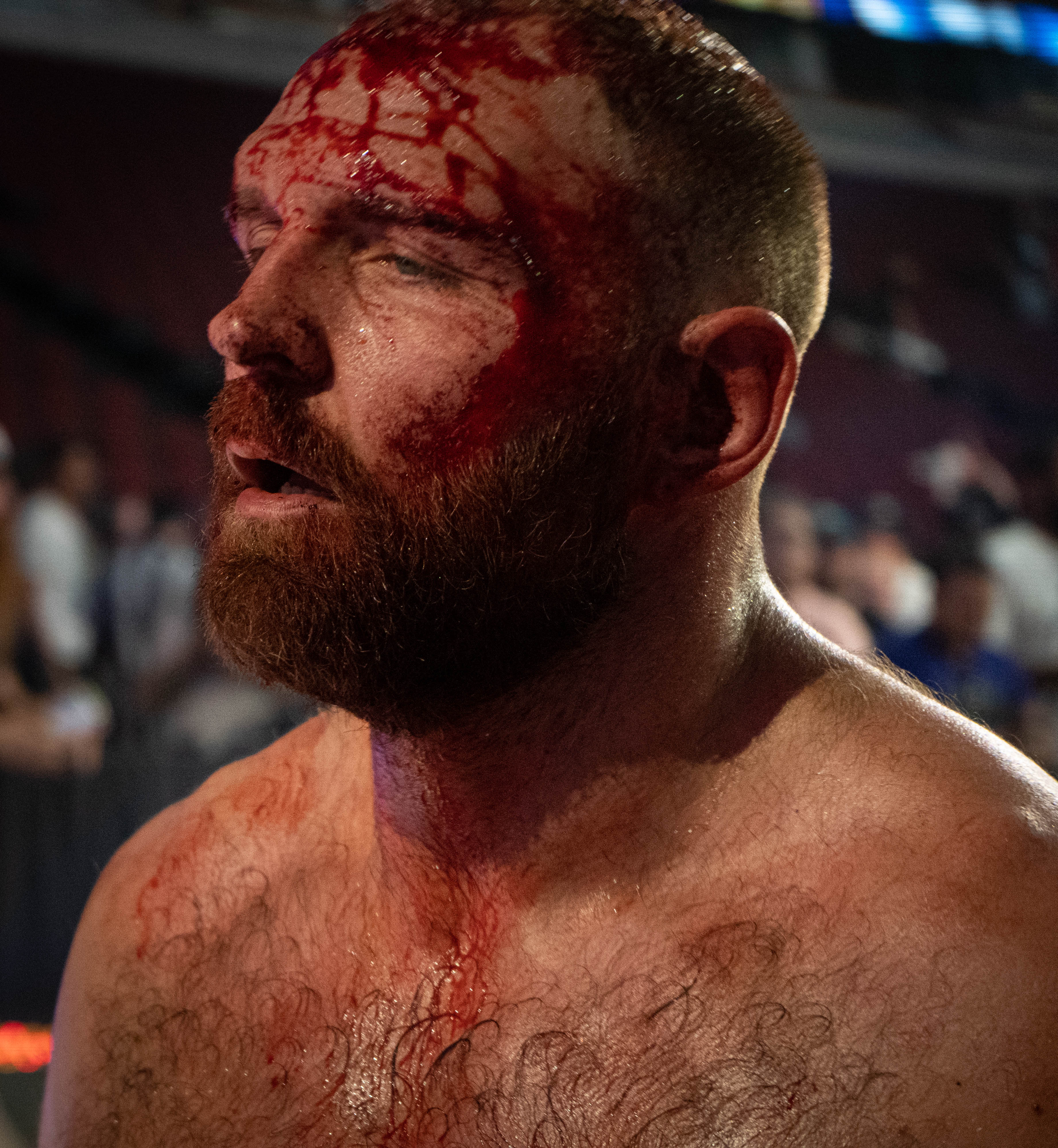
Moxley at AEW x NJPW: Forbidden Door in June 2022

At AEW x NJPW: Forbidden Door, Moxley defeated Hiroshi Tanahashi to win the interim AEW World Championship. Two months later, Moxley defeated by lineal champion CM Punk on the August 24 episode of Dynamite, to win his second AEW World Championship. However, at All Out, Moxley was defeated by Punk, losing the title.

Shortly following the event, Punk was suspended by AEW and the title was vacated, and Moxley regained the championship at Grand Slam by defeating Bryan Danielson in a tournament final. At Full Gear on November 19, Moxley lost the championship to MJF, after he was betrayed by Regal.

Moxley started a feud in late November with the returning Page, who sought revenge after Moxley injured him. Moxley was defeated by Page on the January 11, 2023 episode of Dynamite, but would manage to beat him in a rematch on the February 1 episode of Dynamite. The two faced each other once more in a Texas Deathmatch at Revolution on March 5, which Moxley lost by submission. On the March 8 episode of Dynamite, Moxley, Castagnoli, and Yuta beat down Page and his allies in The Dark Order following a match, turning heel. On March 31, 2023, Moxley made his debut for AEW's sister promotion Ring of Honor (ROH) at Supercard of Honor, accompanying Wheeler Yuta to the ring for his match against Katsuyori Shibata. The BCC would then target Page and his allies Kenny Omega and The Young Bucks, who would reform The Elite to challenge them. BCC faced the members of The Elite and other wrestlers in an Anarchy in the Arena match at Double or Nothing on May 28, at Forbidden Door on June 25, and at Blood and Guts, in a Blood and Guts match.

At the All In event on August 27, the BCC teamed with Santana and Ortiz to face Eddie Kingston, Penta El Zero Miedo and Best Friends (Orange Cassidy, Trent and Chuck Taylor) in a Stadium Stampede match, but lost. The following week at All Out, Moxley defeated Orange Cassidy to win the AEW International Championship. However, he lost the title 17 days later to Rey Fénix at Dynamite: Grand Slam on September 20. During this match, he suffered a legitimate concussion that led to the scripted result of the match being changed to have Fénix win. Due to his injury, Moxley took an absence from wrestling but remained active on AEW programming, including providing commentary at WrestleDream on October 1. He was scheduled to return and face Fénix for the International Championship on the October 10 episode of Dynamite, but was removed from the match due to not being medically cleared and was replaced by Cassidy, who defeated Fénix to win the championship. Cassidy defeated Moxley to retain the championship at Full Gear on November 18. On December 16 at Final Battle, Moxley made his ROH in-ring debut, teaming with Blackpool Combat Members Bryan Danielson and Claudio Castagnoli in a losing effort against FTR (Cash Wheeler and Dax Harwood) and Mark Briscoe. Moxley would also compete in the Continental Classic tournament, but lost to Eddie Kingston in the finals at Worlds End on December 30. In early 2024, The BCC would feud with FTR, with Moxley and Castagnoli defeating them at the Revolution event on March 3, 2024.

==== Death Riders (2024–present) ====
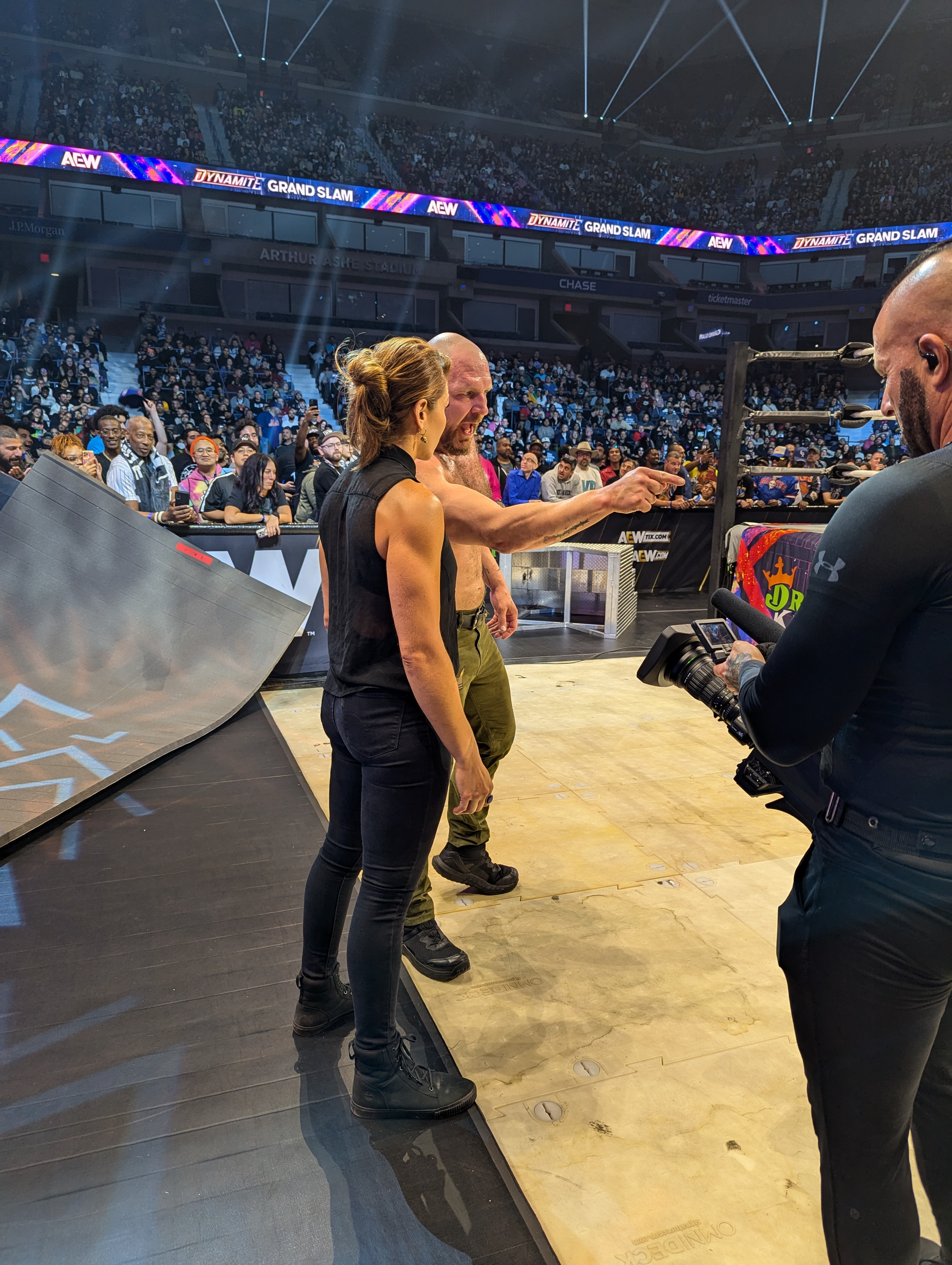
Moxley with Marina Shafir at Grand Slam in September 2024

After Moxley returned after a hiatus in August, he, Marina Shafir, Castagnoli, and Pac kicked Danielson from the Blackpool Combat Club at All Out, renaming the stable as the Death Riders. He defeated Darby Allin at Grand Slam on September 25, thus taking Allin's right to challenge Danielson for the AEW World Championship at WrestleDream. At WrestleDream on October 12, Moxley defeated Danielson to win the AEW World Championship for a record-setting fourth time. At Full Gear on November 23, he successfully defended it against Orange Cassidy. At Worlds End on December 28, he retained it against Cassidy, Adam Page, and Jay White in a four-way match, and after the match, was confronted by FTR and a returning Cope.

At Revolution on March 9, 2025, Moxley retained the championship against Cope and Christian Cage in what became a three-way match after Cage cashed in his Casino Gauntlet contract during the match, and defeated Cope in a rematch for the championship in a street fight on the March 19 episode of Dynamite. At Dynasty on April 6, he defended it against Swerve Strickland, winning after interference from The Young Bucks. At Beach Break on May 14, Moxley defended his championship against Samoa Joe in a steel cage match, winning after interference from the Death Riders and Gabe Kidd. At Double or Nothing on May 25, the Death Riders teamed with The Young Bucks in a losing effort against Kenny Omega, Swerve Strickland, Willow Nightingale, and The Opps in an Anarchy in the Arena match. At All In on July 12, he was defeated by Adam Page in a Texas Death match, following interference from Will Ospreay, Swerve Strickland, Bryan Danielson and a returning Darby Allin, losing the championship and ending his fourth reign at 273 days. He failed to regain title from Page in a rematch on the July 30 episode of Dynamite. At Forbidden Door on August 24, the Death Riders teamed with the Young Bucks in a losing effort against Ospreay, Allin, Hiroshi Tanahashi, and Golden☆Lovers (Kenny Omega and Kota Ibushi) in a Lights Out steel cage match, with the Death Riders afterwards attacking Ospreay and giving him a kayfabe neck injury. Moxley then rekindled his feud with Allin and recruited Daniel Garcia into the Death Riders. At All Out on September 20, he defeated Allin in a coffin match after Pac returned to assist him, but was defeated in an I Quit match at WrestleDream on October 18.

Following this, Moxley would undergo a losing streak, and the Death Riders were defeated by Allin, Roderick Strong, and The Conglomeration (Mark Briscoe, Orange Cassidy, and Kyle O'Reilly) in a Blood and Guts match at the namesake event on November 12, after Moxley submitted to O'Reilly. At Full Gear on November 22, he was defeated by O'Reilly in a No Holds Barred match, after submitting to an ankle lock. On November 24, Moxley was announced as a participant in the 2025 Continental Classic, where he was placed in the Blue League. Moxley finished the tournament second in his league with 9 points and advanced to the semi-finals at Worlds End on December 27, where he defeated Kyle Fletcher in the semi-finals and defending champion Kazuchika Okada in the finals at Worlds End to win the tournament and the AEW Continental Championship. In his post-match promo, Moxley became a tweener after praising the rest of the participants in the tournament and thanking the AEW fans for their support.

On February 14, 2026 at Grand Slam Australia, Moxley defended his title against Konosuke Takeshita, where the bout ended in a time limit draw. At Revolution on March 15, Moxley defeated Takeshita and retained his title in a rematch with no time limit. After the match, Moxley and the Death Riders were attacked by a returning Will Ospreay who Moxley had injured seven months prior. On April 12 at Dynasty, Moxley successfully defended his title against Ospreay. Following Dynasty, the Death Riders formed an alliance with Ospreay after Moxley offered to train him, believing Ospreay had become mentally fragile following his injury and would continue to get hurt if he remained on his current path. Moxley made successful defenses of the Continental Championship against Kyle O'Reilly at Double or Nothing on May 24, and Bandido at Forbidden Door on June 28. During this time, Moxley would officially add Gabe Kidd and Will Ospreay to the Death Riders. However, Ospreay would betray Moxley and the Death Riders at Redemption on July 26 after refusing to attack Kenny Omega. In August 2026, Moxley entered the inaugural Continental Challenge Cup, defeating Jack Perry in the first round, Jay White in the quarter-final, Claudio Castagnoli in the semi-final, and Nigel McGuinness in the grand final at All In on August 30 to win the tournanment and retaining the Continental Championship. On September 26 at All Out, Moxley failed to win a record-setting fifth AEW World Champiosnhip against Will Ospreay. At WrestleDream on October 17, Moxley successfully defended his title against Mark Davis. On the October 21 episode of Dynamite, the Death Riders all officially turned face after they and The Conglomeration were all attacked by The Dogs and the Bang Bang Gang, who turned heel. Moxley and the Death Riders teamed with the Conglomeration to face the Dogs and Bang Bang Gang – who had merged into a new faction, The Cut – at Full Gear on November 14 in an Anarchy in the Arena match, which they lost.

=== New Japan Pro-Wrestling (2019–present) ===
==== IWGP United States Heavyweight Champion (2019–2021) ====
After weeks of New Japan Pro-Wrestling (NJPW) airing videos of a mystery man targeting IWGP United States Heavyweight Champion Juice Robinson, Moxley was revealed as the culprit in May 2019, challenging Robinson for a title match at the final night of the Best of the Super Juniors 26 tournament on June 5. At the event, he defeated Robinson in his NJPW in-ring debut to win the championship, making him the first wrestler to hold both IWGP and WWE United States Championships. Following Moxley's original challenge, AEW CEO Tony Khan stated that Moxley would be able to take independent and international bookings during the summer before AEW's television deal started in the fall of that year. However, during an interview with Nikkan Sports, Good clarified that he would continue to appear for NJPW while being signed to AEW. At Dominion 6.9 in Osaka-jo Hall on June 9, Moxley defeated Shota Umino before declaring himself as an entrant in the 2019 G1 Climax tournament, but he didn't win the tournament.

On October 13, after he was unable to defend the United States Heavyweight Championship in a scheduled match against Robinson due to travel issues stemming from Typhoon Hagibis, Moxley agreed to vacate the championship. He was replaced in the match by Lance Archer, who defeated Robinson to win the championship. Moxley regained the title at Wrestle Kingdom 14 in January 2020, defeating Lance Archer in a Texas Deathmatch, and subsequently successfully retained the championship against Robinson the following night. Moxley successfully defended the championship against Minoru Suzuki at The New Beginning in Osaka in February, which was Moxley's final match in NJPW for over a year, due to travelling issues relating to the COVID-19 pandemic. On August 1, Moxley surpassed Kenny Omega as the longest reigning United States Heavyweight Champion.

Moxley returned to NJPW on their United States events of Strong, retaining the title against Kenta at The New Beginning USA on February 26. Through NJPW's partnership with AEW, Moxley successfully defended the United States Heavyweight Championship on AEW events against Yuji Nagata and Karl Anderson. He lost the title back to Lance Archer in a Texas Deathmatch, ending his record-breaking reign at 564 days.

==== Sporadic appearances and IWGP World Heavyweight Champion (2021–present) ====
On the November 27 episode of Strong, Moxley teamed with Eddie Kingston to face Minoru Suzuki and Lance Archer in a Philadelphia Street Fight, which the latter team won. Moxley returned to the promotion to face Will Ospreay at the Windy City Riot event on April 16, 2022, where he was victorious in the main event. At the Capital Collision event on May 14, Moxley challenged for the United States Heavyweight Championship in a fatal four-way match including Ospreay, Juice Robinson, and Hiroshi Tanahashi, which Robinson won.

He would return to NJPW in 2023 and 2024, wrestling for the newly created IWGP Global Heavyweight Championship at Wrestle Kingdom 18 in a triple threat match which was won by David Finlay.

Moxley would win the IWGP World Heavyweight Championship after he defeated Tetsuya Naito at Windy City Riot, becoming the first wrestler to become a world champion in WWE, AEW, and NJPW. Moxley defended the championship at AEW events, including the April 24 episode of Dynamite, where he defeated Powerhouse Hobbs. He also defeated Konosuke Takeshita in an IWGP World Heavyweight Championship eliminator match at AEW Double or Nothing on May 26.

On May 4, Moxley successfully defended his title against Narita on night 2 of Wrestling Dontaku. On May 11 at Resurgence, Moxley successfully defended the title against Umino. Post-match, Moxley and Umino were attacked by Evil, who declared himself to be the next challenger. The match was later made official for Dominion 6.9 in Osaka-jo Hall, where Moxley defeated Evil to retain the title. After the match, Moxley was confronted by previous champion Tetsuya Naito, who challenged Moxley to a rematch at Forbidden Door and Moxley accepted. At Forbidden Door on June 30, Moxley lost the title back to Naito, ending his reign at 79 days with four successful defenses.

Moxley returned to Japan after over two years on November 3, 2026 at Power Struggle, teaming with Wheeler Yuta in a losing effort against Jeff Cobb and Shingo Takagi. Following the match, Takagi challenged Moxley to an Unbound Deathmatch at Wrestle Kingdom 21 which Moxley accepted.

=== Return to the independent circuit (2019–present) ===
Starting in June 2019, Moxley made sporadic appearances for several independent promotions such as Northeast Wrestling (NEW) and Future Stars of Wrestling (FSW). He was also set to wrestle matches for Over the Top Wrestling (OTT) and Game Changer Wrestling (GCW), but the scheduled events were cancelled due to the COVID-19 pandemic. On October 11, 2020, Moxley defeated Chris Dickinson at Josh Barnett's Bloodsport 3. He then defeated Davey Boy Smith Jr. in the main event of Josh Barnett's Bloodsport 5 on February 20, 2021, before losing to Josh Barnett at Josh Barnett's Bloodsport 6 on April 8.

At GCW's The Art of War Games pay-per-view in September 2021, Moxley defeated Matt Cardona as a surprise opponent to win the GCW World Championship. On January 23, 2022, Moxley retained the GCW World Championship against Homicide at The Wrld on GCW event. At Josh Barnett's Bloodsport 8 in March, Moxley defeated Biff Busick. At GCW's Fight Club event on October 8, Moxley lost the GCW World Championship to Nick Gage in a title vs. career match, ending his reign at 399 days.

=== Consejo Mundial de Lucha Libre (2024, 2026) ===
On March 29, 2024, Moxley made his Consejo Mundial de Lucha Libre (CMLL) debut at Homenaje a Dos Leyendas ("Homage to Two Legends"), teaming with Claudio Castagnoli, Bryan Danielson and Matt Sydal in a losing effort against Volador Jr., Blue Panther, Místico and Último Guerrero. Moxley made another appearance for CMLL at Homenaje a Dos Leyendas on March 20, 2026, teaming with Daniel Garcia and Wheeler Yuta to unsuccessfully challenge El Sky Team (Místico, Máscara Dorada and Neón) for the CMLL World Trios Championship.

== Professional wrestling style, persona, and reception ==
Good was given the Jon Moxley ring name shortly before his first match by a fellow wrestler, who had misheard the name of James Van Der Beek's character Jonathan Moxon in the 1999 film Varsity Blues. He later said, "I'd probably been thinking about names for years and years, but I had no ideas. ... So, right before I'm about to go out the ring announcer said, 'What's the name?' I didn't have one. ... This other wrestler guy was just like, 'It's like the Varsity Blues guy. He's like the guy from Varsity Blues. Jonathan Moxley.' They're like, 'That's cool.' I was too nervous to say yes or no. ... Actually, in the movie, it's Moxon. So the guy screwed up the name a little bit. It wasn't my idea at all, it was just foisted upon me."

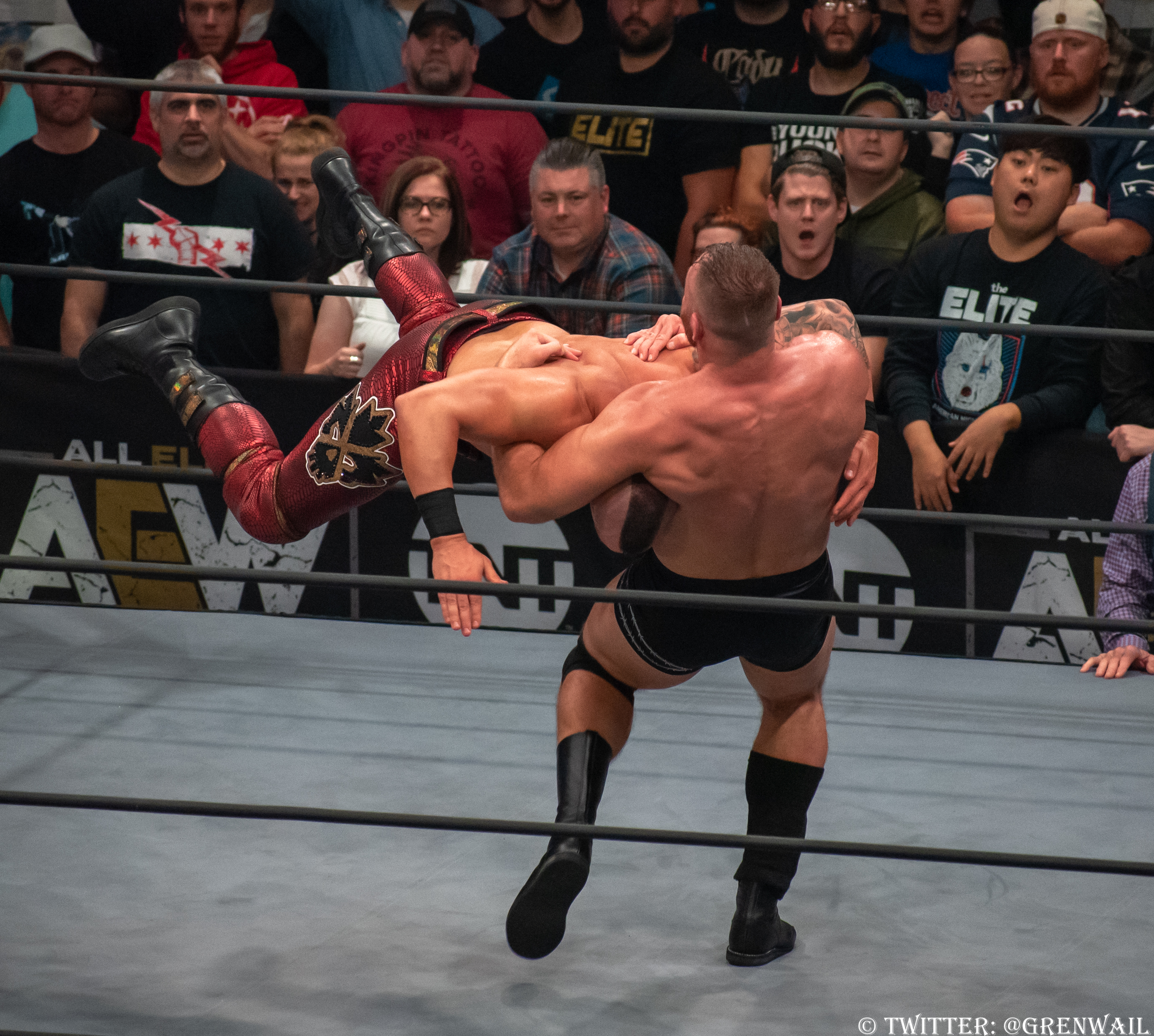
Moxley performing his finishing move, known as the Dirty Deeds in WWE and the Paradigm Shift or Death Rider in AEW and NJPW, on Shawn Spears

After debuting on WWE television as Dean Ambrose with The Shield, Good utilized a headlock driver, the Dirty Deeds, as a finishing move. Soon after The Shield's initial split in 2014, he did not feel comfortable using a headlock driver on some wrestlers, so the Dirty Deeds was changed to a double underhook DDT. Upon his departure from WWE, he changed his finisher to a lifted underhook DDT or a double underhook brainbuster, the Paradigm Shift (in AEW) or the Death Rider (in NJPW and later in AEW) and began using submissions such as a bulldog choke and a rear-naked choke. During his tenure in WWE's FCW territory, he used William Regal's finishing moves the Knee Trembler (a running knee lift) and the Regal Stretch (a cross-legged arm trap STF) to mock Regal during their feud.

Referred to as the "Lunatic Fringe" since his time in The Shield after the nickname of Cincinnati radio station WEBN (which itself got it from the song of the same name by Red Rider), Ambrose's WWE gimmick saw him characterized as a mentally unstable and unpredictable wildcard. His gimmick has been compared to Heath Ledger's Joker from the 2008 film The Dark Knight. After becoming a villain in late 2018, Ambrose began proclaiming himself the "Moral Compass of WWE", and this revamped character—with his use of gas masks, fur-lined coats, military attire, and a SWAT-like team to do his bidding—invited comparisons to Tom Hardy's Bane from the 2012 sequel The Dark Knight Rises.

Ambrose's booking during his feuds with Seth Rollins and Bray Wyatt in 2014 was criticized by commentators, including James Caldwell of the Pro Wrestling Torch, who stated that although "he's a utility main eventer", his lack of victories indicated that he was not "a guy" that WWE was positioning "for a 2-3 year sustained run on top". Ambrose's post-Shield run as a heroic character gained significant popularity, with him being cheered over fellow heroic character Roman Reigns when they faced off in three world title matches (Payback and Survivor Series in 2015 and Fastlane in 2016). Regarding Ambrose's popularity compared to Reigns, CNET writer Daniel Van Boom wrote that "unfortunately for the company, the same fans that rejected Reigns love Ambrose. ... Ambrose, as a physically smaller performer in a land where giants are preferred, is the true dark horse, both on camera and behind the scenes." Ambrose was voted as the Most Popular Wrestler of the Year by Pro Wrestling Illustrated readers in 2014 and 2015.

Good's reversion to his Jon Moxley gimmick and subsequent debut at AEW's Double or Nothing after leaving WWE in 2019 was widely praised, with Phillip Martinez of Newsweek commenting that Good had caused "the wrestling world to erupt" after his surprise appearance. Considered one of AEW's biggest stars, he has been dubbed "the cornerstone of AEW" by Justin Barrasso of Sports Illustrated, and fellow AEW wrestler and on-screen rival Kenny Omega referred to Moxley as the "MVP of AEW" in May 2023. Variety also attributed Moxley as one of the promotion's biggest ratings attractions for their weekly broadcast. From 2021 to 2024, Moxley used a version of the song "Wild Thing" by X as his entrance theme, as tribute to Japanese wrestler Atsushi Onita, who utilized the same song.

Although his post-WWE work has been mostly lauded, the booking of his fourth AEW World Championship reign and involvement in the Death Riders faction in 2024 and 2025 was met broadly with negative reactions by wrestling journalists and fans, with criticism being given to the angle's lack of direction and repetitiveness. In particular, the endings to the 2025 Revolution and Dynasty pay-per-views, which saw Moxley defeat his opponents in controversial fashion following interference, were widely panned. Moxley has also been the frequent subject of scorn by notable wrestling personality Jim Cornette, who often derides his wrestling style and has called Moxley "the worst wrestler in the world".

== Submission grappling ==
Good began learning mixed martial arts in 2019 for his role in the film Cagefighter: Worlds Collide (2020). After he finished filming, he continued training in MMA at Xtreme Couture, which included training with Randy Couture himself.

Good competed at the NAGA Cincinnati Grappling Championships on July 15, 2023, winning the men's no-gi beginner/super-heavyweight/30+ age division by beating Chris Sailor, the only other competitor in that bracket. At the same event, he competed in the men's no-gi beginner/absolute weight division, beating Sailor again in the first round before losing by submission in the second round.

Good returned to competition at Twisted Tournament: Cincinnati on August 19, entering two white belt divisions again but losing all of his matches.

Good competed in amateur grappling again in March 2024, losing via submission to a choke.

== Other media ==
As Dean Ambrose, Good made his acting debut in the WWE produced action film 12 Rounds 3: Lockdown (2015), in which he starred as detective John Shaw. He also made an uncredited cameo in the WWE film Countdown (2016). Under his real name, he appeared in the sports action film Cagefighter: Worlds Collide (2020) as Randy Stone, a professional wrestler who crosses over to MMA and fights the film's protagonist.

Good, as Dean Ambrose, appears as a playable character in the video games WWE 2K14, WWE 2K15, WWE 2K16, WWE 2K17, WWE 2K18, and WWE 2K19. He also appears in AEW Fight Forever, as Jon Moxley.

In 2011, Smart Mark Video released Stories from the Streets: The Jon Moxley Story, a DVD featuring several of Good's matches in CZW, HWA, and IPW, as well as a two-and-a-half hour shoot interview with Good. Good's autobiography Mox was released on November 2, 2021.

=== Filmography ===
Year	Title	Role	Notes
2015	12 Rounds 3: Lockdown	John Shaw	Credited as Dean Ambrose
2016	Countdown	Himself	Uncredited
2020	Cagefighter: Worlds Collide	Randy Stone	

== Personal life ==
In 2013, Good began dating Canadian interviewer Renee Paquette. They lived near Las Vegas, where they were married in an impromptu ceremony at their home in the early hours of April 9, 2017. Their daughter was born on June 13, 2021. In order to be closer to both his family in his hometown of Cincinnati and Paquette's family in her hometown of Toronto, they soon relocated to the Mount Auburn neighborhood of Cincinnati. They are fans of the Cincinnati Bengals.

Good has referred to himself as a loner, which he has often incorporated into his onscreen character. He has also called himself a minimalist, revealing that he drove to WWE's training center in his rundown car with only a bag of clothes and the money in his pocket upon accepting their contract offer. He was roommates with fellow wrestler Big Cass during this time; when he moved out after being promoted to WWE's main roster, he left behind thousands of dollars' worth of merchandise the company had sent him as a goodwill gesture and told Cass to "give it to charity or something". He then moved into his new apartment, which he left primarily unfurnished because he reasoned that he would be traveling most of the time.

Good is a notably private person who avoids social media, which has been seen as rare in the era of wrestlers using it to advance storylines. He refused to use the Twitter profile WWE created for him in 2012, and said in 2014 that he does not "feel the need to open [himself] up to the opinion of everybody in the world with a phone or computer". He began using Twitter and Instagram in 2019, but had stopped updating the former by 2022 and the latter by 2024. He said of social media in 2021, "Everybody just seems to hate it [...] so then why are we using it?" When asked in 2024 why he did not delete his abandoned profiles, he said, "I don't want anybody to steal it and start pretending to be me, so I keep it, but [...] my advice to the entire world would be [to] get off that thing. Take it off your phone. Throw it in the garbage."

To be closer to the recommended doctors during his recovery from an injured arm in 2018, Good briefly lived in Birmingham, Alabama, where he contracted an MRSA infection in his arm that he later said nearly killed him.

In November 2021, at Good's request, Tony Khan announced that Good had checked himself into rehab for alcoholism. He returned to wrestling three months later.

== Championships and accomplishments ==
=== Professional wrestling ===
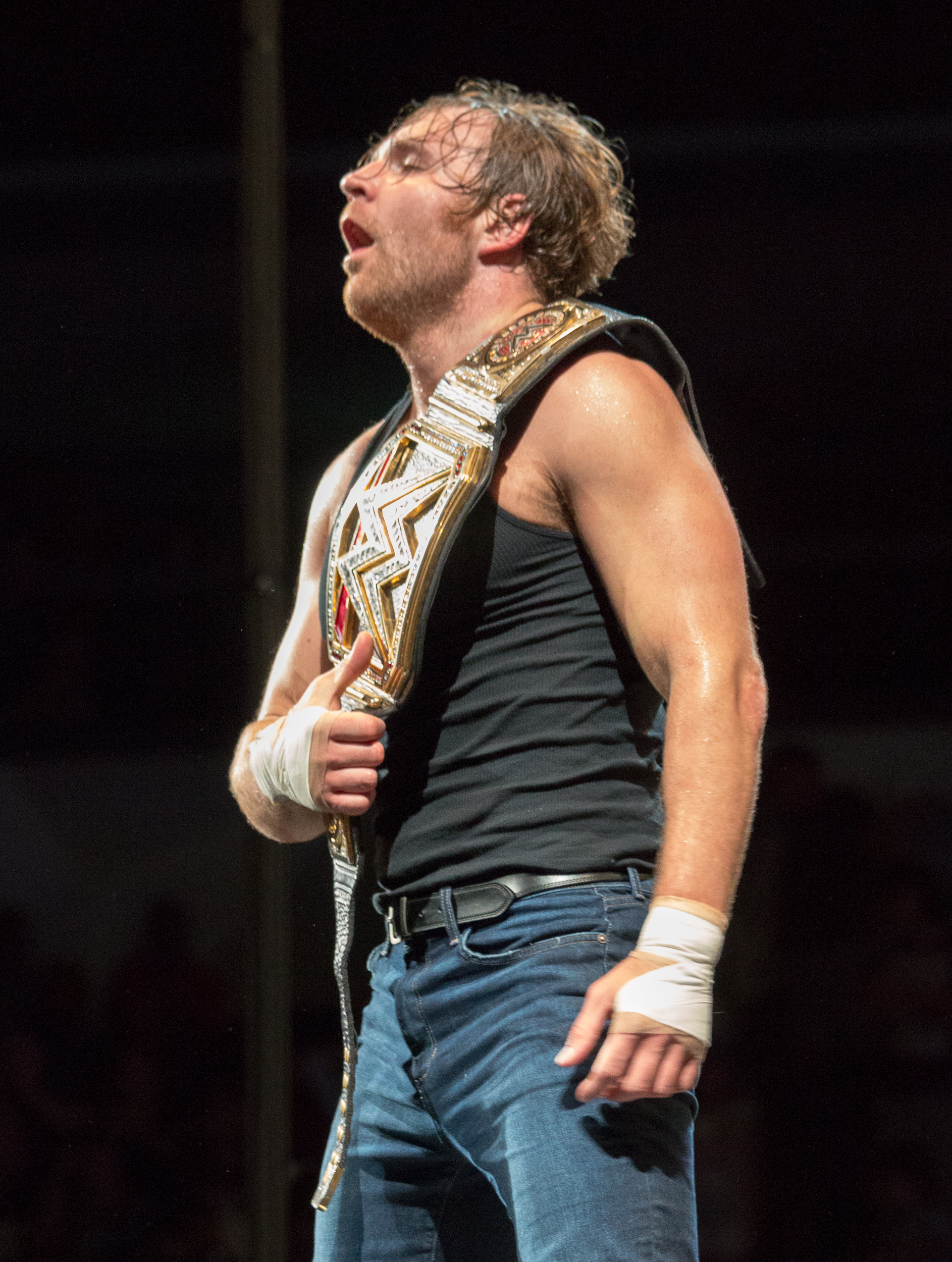
As Dean Ambrose, Good is a one-time WWE Champion...

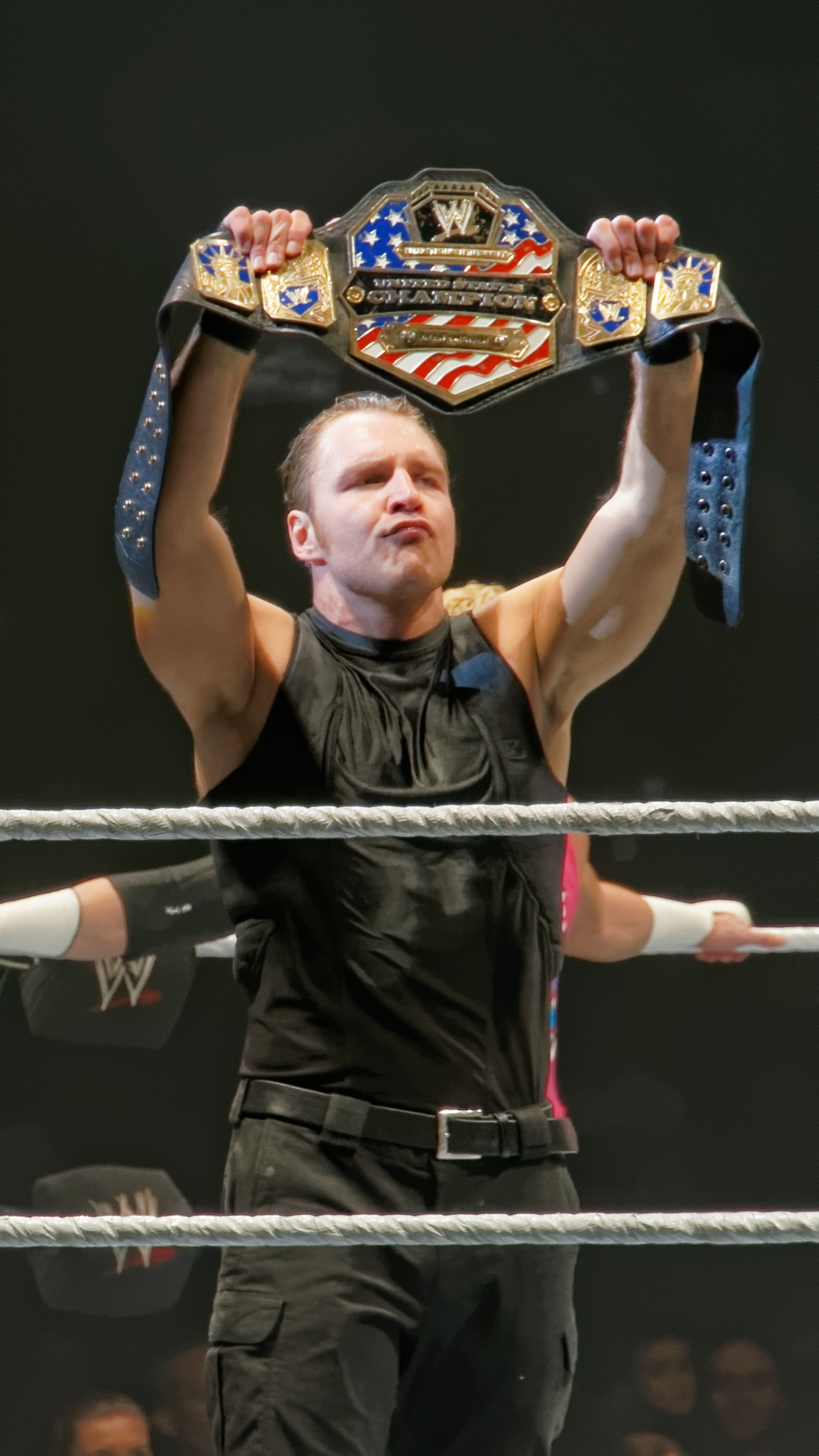
... a one-time United States Champion, with his 351-day reign being the longest under the WWE banner...

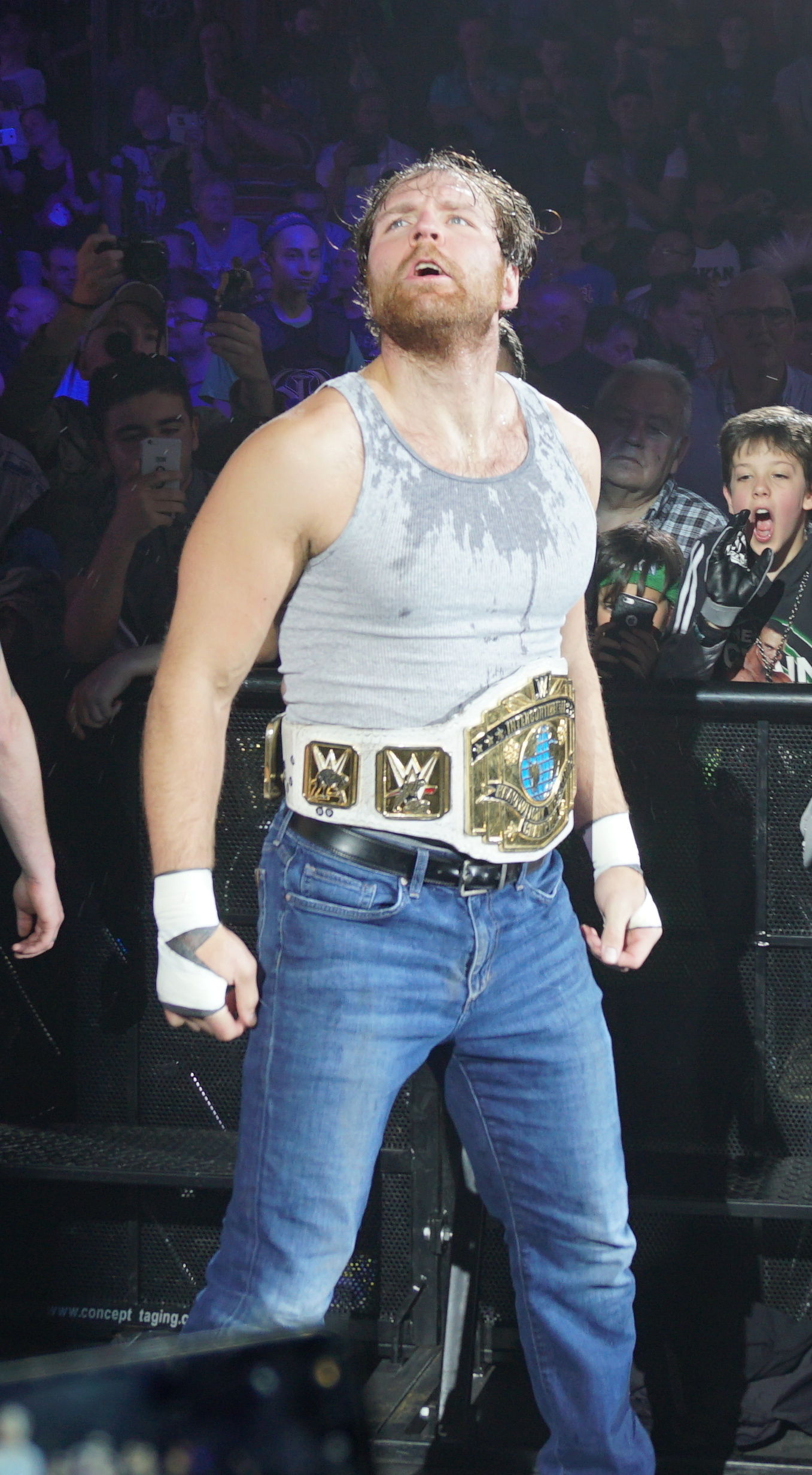
... and a three-time Intercontinental Champion.

As Jon Moxley, Good is a record four-time AEW World Champion...

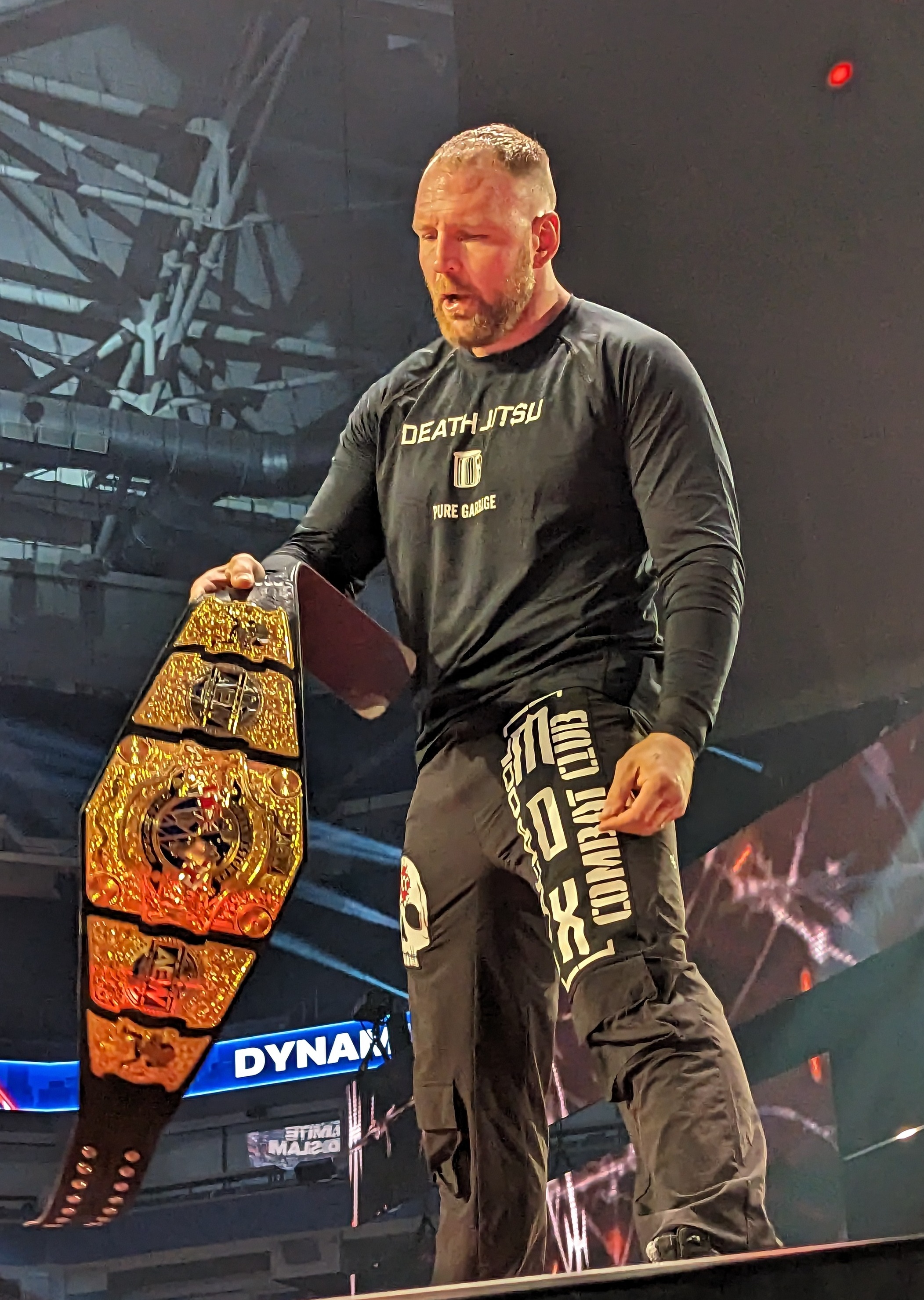
... and a one-time International Champion.

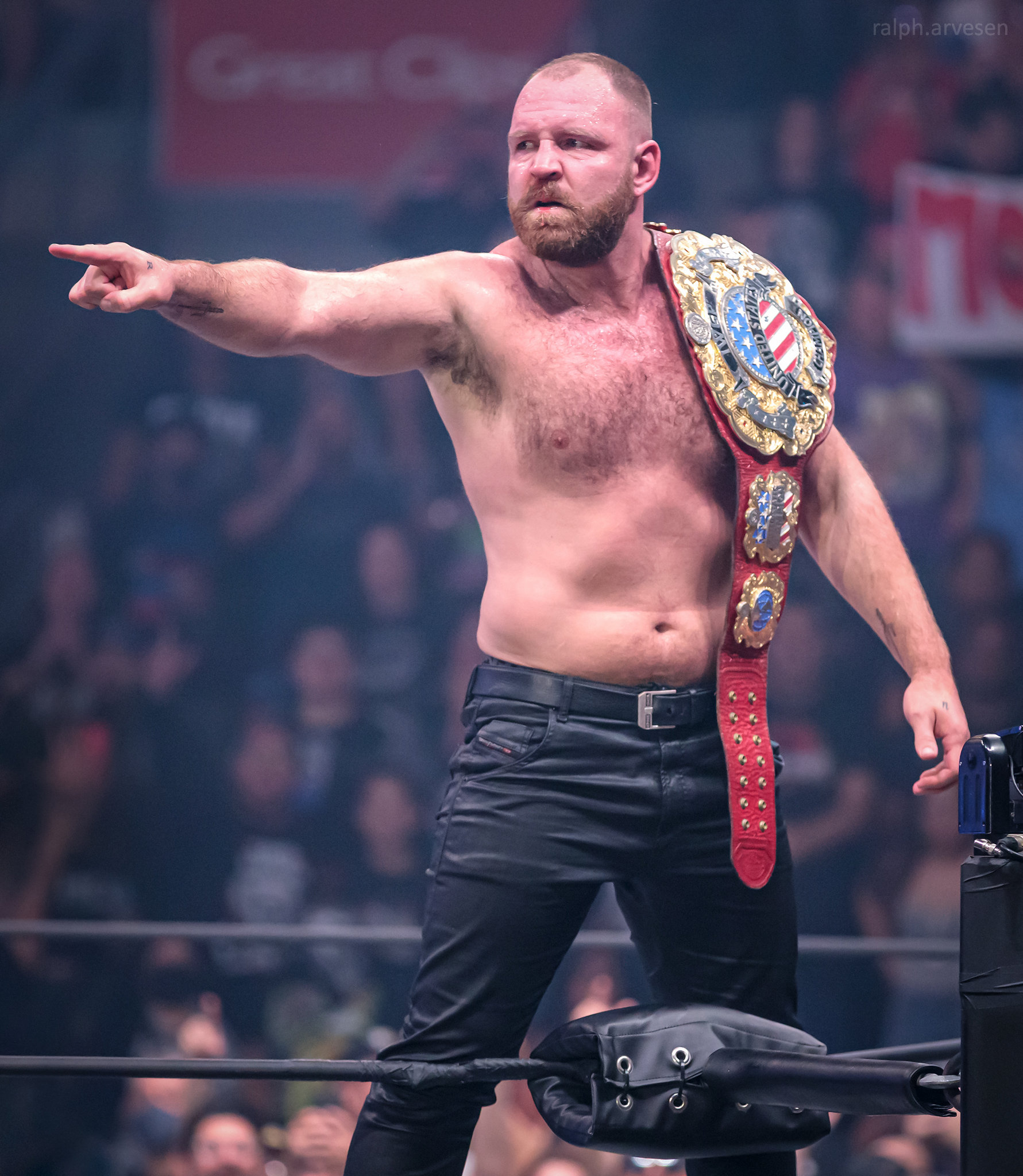
Moxley is also a two-time IWGP United States Heavyweight Champion, the only wrestler to have held both the WWE and IWGP U.S. Championships.

- All Elite Wrestling
  - AEW World Championship (4 times)
  - AEW Interim World Championship (1 time)
  - AEW International Championship (1 time)
  - AEW Continental Championship (1 time, current)
  - AEW World Championship #1 Contender Tournament (2020)
  - AEW Interim World Championship Eliminator Series (2022)
  - AEW Grand Slam Tournament of Champions (2022)
  - Continental Classic (2025)
  - Continental Challenge Cup (2026)
- Combat Zone Wrestling
  - CZW World Heavyweight Championship (2 times)
- Full Impact Pro
  - FIP World Heavyweight Championship (1 time)
- Game Changer Wrestling
  - GCW World Championship (1 time)
- Heartland Wrestling Association
  - HWA Heavyweight Championship (3 times)
  - HWA Tag Team Championship (5 times) – with Jimmy Turner (1), Ric Byrne (1), Cody Hawk (1) and King Vu (2)
  - Drake Younger Invitational Tournament (2009)
- Mad-Pro Wrestling
  - MPW Heavyweight Championship (1 time)
  - MPW Tag Team Championship (1 times) – with Dustin Rayz
- Insanity Pro Wrestling
  - IPW World Heavyweight Championship (Note: During Moxley's first reign, the title was called the IPW Grand Championship.) (2 times)
  - IPW Mid-American Championship (1 time)
- International Wrestling Association
  - IWA Tag Team Championship (1 time) – with Hade Vansen
- New Japan Pro-Wrestling
  - IWGP Heavyweight Championship (1 time) (Note: During Moxley's reign, the title was called the IWGP World Heavyweight Championship.)
  - IWGP Intercontinental Championship (1 time) (Note: With the reactivation of the IWGP Heavyweight Championship and the restored and combined histories of both it, the World Heavyweight, and the Intercontinental titles, all former IWGP World Heavyweight Champions are retroactively recognized as having been an IWGP Intercontinental Champion.)
  - IWGP United States Heavyweight Championship (2 times)
- New York Post
  - Male Wrestler of the Year (2022)
- Pro Wrestling Illustrated
  - Feud of the Year (2014) vs. Seth Rollins
  - Most Popular Wrestler of the Year (2014, 2015, 2022)
  - Inspirational Wrestler of the Year (2022)
  - Wrestler of the Year (2020)
  - Ranked No. 1 of the top 500 singles wrestlers in the PWI 500 in 2020
- Rolling Stone
  - Best Briefly Resuscitated Storyline (2015) vs. Seth Rollins
  - Most Likeable Loose Cannon (2014)
- Sports Illustrated
  - Male Wrestler of the Year (2019)
  - Ranked No. 2 of the top 10 wrestlers in 2022
  - Rivalry of the Year (2025) vs. Adam Page
- Westside Xtreme Wrestling
  - wXw World Tag Team Championship (1 time) – with Sami Callihan
  - wXw World Tag Team Title Tournament (2009) with Sami Callihan
- Wrestling Observer Newsletter
  - Best Brawler (2020–2023, 2025)
  - Best Pro Wrestling Book (2021) Mox
  - Feud of the Year (2020) vs. Eddie Kingston
  - Feud of the Year (2025) vs. "Hangman" Adam Page
  - Shad Gaspard/Jon Huber Memorial Award (2021)
  - United States/Canada MVP (2020, 2022, 2025)
  - Wrestler of the Year (2020, 2022)
  - Worst Feud of the Year (2013) – as part of The Authority vs. Big Show
- WWE
  - WWE Championship (Note: When Ambrose won the title, it was known as the WWE World Heavyweight Championship. During the middle of his reign, the name was shortened to the WWE Championship and subsequently the WWE World Championship.) (1 time)
  - WWE Intercontinental Championship (3 times)
  - WWE United States Championship (1 time)
  - WWE Raw Tag Team Championship (2 times) – with Seth Rollins
  - 27th Triple Crown Champion
  - Eighth Grand Slam Champion (under current format; 16th overall)
  - Money in the Bank (2016)
  - Slammy Award (5 times)
    - Breakout Star of the Year (2013, 2014) – 2013 award shared with The Shield
    - Faction of the Year (2013, 2014) – with The Shield
    - Trending Now (Hashtag) of the Year (2013) – #BelieveInTheShield, with The Shield
  - WWE Year-End Awards (2 times)
    - Best Reunion (2018) – as part of The Shield
    - Return of the Year (2018)

=== Submission grappling ===
- North American Grappling Association
  - NAGA Cincinnati Grappling Championship Gold Medalist - Men No-Gi / Beginner / 225 - 249.9 (Super Heavy Weight / Master (30+))

== Bibliography ==
- MOX (Permuted Press, 2021, Hardcover) ISBN 1-63758-038-X, ISBN 978-1637580387
