= Elijah Baker (actor) =

English actor (born 1992)

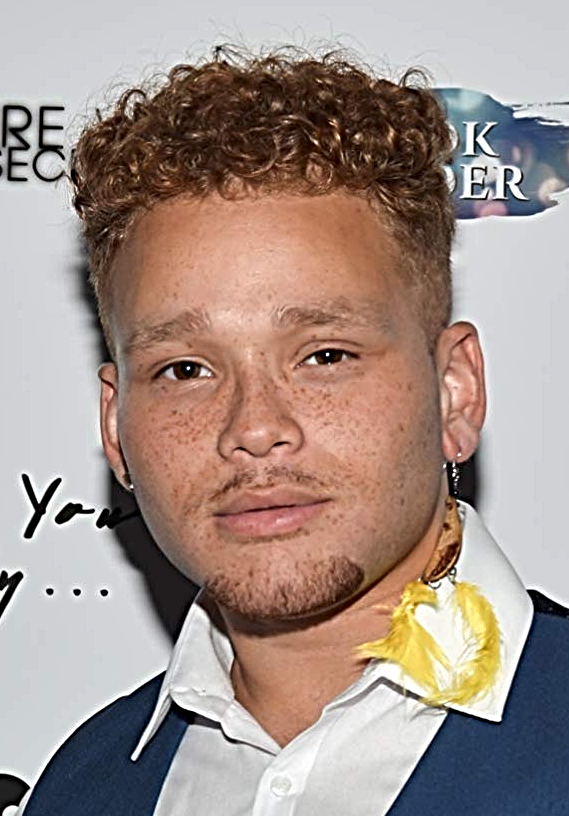
- Baker in August 2016
- Born: 30 May 1991 (age 35)
- Occupations: Actor, writer, director
- Years active: 2008–present

Elijah Alexander Baker (born 30 May 1991) is an English actor, writer, and director. He founded his own independent production company, Enuff Talk Productions, in 2016. In 2017, he won a BUFF Award for Best Emerging Male Actor in his role in Signs of Silence.

== Filmography ==
Film and television
Year	Title	Role	Notes	Refs
2008	The Bill	Vinny Chapman	Series 24, Episode 21	
2008	Silent Witness	Charlie B	Series 12, Episode 1 & 2 "Safe"	
2008	Dustbin Baby	Hoody boy	TV movie	
2008–2011	The Sarah Jane Adventures	Steve Wallace	3 episodes	
2009	Molly and Plum	Plum	Short	
2010	New Tricks	Hoodie	Series 7, Episode 3 "Left Field"	
2010	PhoneShop	Little Britain	Series 1, Episode 4 "Bad Bear Man"	
2011	Injustice	Darren	Episodes 1, 2 & 4	
2011	My Angel	Aaron	Film	
2012	Deviation	Bez	Film	
2012	My Murder	Tiny Bouncer	TV movie	
2012	High Hopes	Andre	Short	
2013	Vendetta	Joshua Evans		
2014	Babylon	Sam	Episode 1	
2014	We Still Kill the Old Way	JP		
2015	Game Over	Elijah	Short	
2015	His Fathers Son	Jimmy Cambell	Short	
2016	Signs of Silence	Eli	Short	
2016	The Weekend	Spencer		
2017	The Booth	Twist	Web / Ongoing Series Regular	
2017	Dim Squad	Eli	Short; written and directed by Baker	
2017	Book Trader	Damian	Short	
2018	Tango One	PM	Film	
2018	Amare	Amare	Film	
2020	Are We Dead Yet?	Micky	Film	
2020	Cagefighter: Worlds Collide	Reggie	Film	

=== Music videos ===
Year	Song	Artist	Role	Refs
2013	"Man in the Dark"	RXD		
