= Full Gear (2021) =

All Elite Wrestling pay-per-view event

- Promotional poster featuring Kenny Omega and "Hangman" Adam Page
- Promotion: All Elite Wrestling
- Date: November 13, 2021
- City: Minneapolis, Minnesota
- Venue: Target Center
- Attendance: 10,442
- Buy rate: 155,000

Pay-per-view chronology
← Previous; All Out	Next → Revolution

Full Gear chronology
← Previous; 2020	Next → 2022

The 2021 Full Gear was a professional wrestling pay-per-view (PPV) event produced by All Elite Wrestling (AEW). It was the third annual Full Gear and took place on November 13, 2021, at the Target Center in Minneapolis, Minnesota, marking AEW's first PPV to be held in Minnesota. The event aired on traditional PPV outlets, as well as on B/R Live in North America and FITE TV internationally.

Ten matches were contested at the event, including one on The Buy In pre-show. In the main event, "Hangman" Adam Page defeated Kenny Omega to win the AEW World Championship. In other prominent matches, CM Punk defeated Eddie Kingston, Bryan Danielson defeated Miro by technical submission in the AEW World Championship Eliminator Tournament final match, and in the opening bout, MJF defeated Darby Allin. The event also saw the AEW debut of Jay Lethal, and also marked the final AEW PPV appearance of Cody Rhodes, who left the company three months later for WWE.

The event was highly praised by fans and critics with praise being particularly focused on the main event match between Page and Omega.

== Production ==
=== Background ===
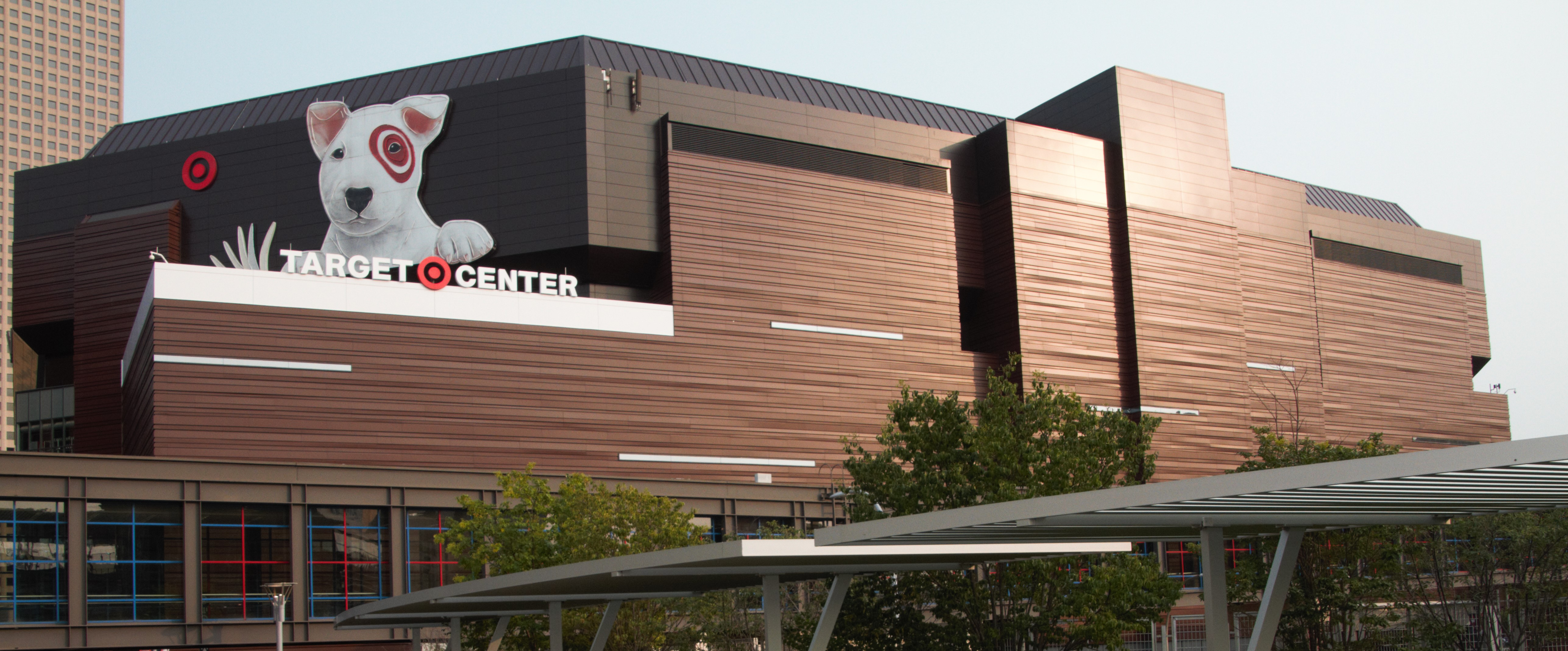
The event was held at the Target Center in Minneapolis, Minnesota, marking All Elite Wrestling's first pay-per-view event to be held in Minnesota.

Full Gear is a professional wrestling pay-per-view (PPV) event held annually in November by All Elite Wrestling (AEW) since 2019, generally around the week of Veterans Day. It is one of AEW's "Big Four" PPVs, which includes Double or Nothing, All Out, and Revolution, their four biggest domestic shows produced quarterly. Out of the four, Full Gear is AEW's only pay-per-view to be traditionally held on a Saturday. The 2021 Full Gear was originally scheduled to be held on November 6, 2021, at the Chaifetz Arena in St. Louis, Missouri, which would have been AEW's first PPV held in Missouri. However, during All Out on September 5, it was announced that the third Full Gear event would instead take place on November 13, but with no reference to a location. It was reported that the event was pushed back a week to avoid competition with UFC 268 and the Canelo Álvarez vs. Caleb Plant boxing match. On September 27, it was announced that the event had been relocated to the Target Center in Minneapolis, Minnesota, marking AEW's first PPV to be held in Minnesota.

=== Storylines ===
Full Gear featured professional wrestling matches that involved different wrestlers from pre-existing feuds and storylines. Storylines were produced on AEW's weekly television programs, Dynamite and Rampage, the supplementary online streaming shows, Dark and Elevation, and The Young Bucks' YouTube series Being The Elite.

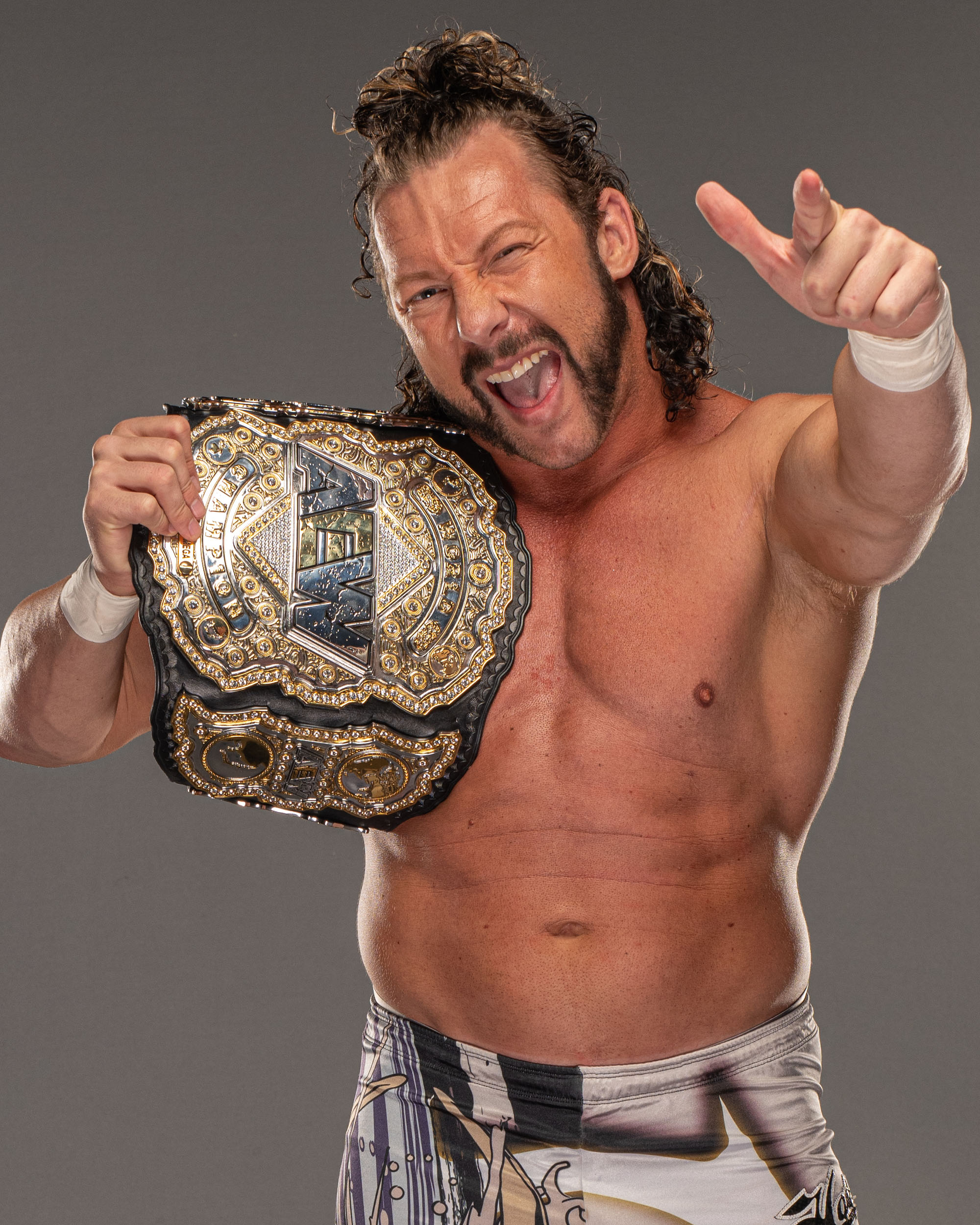
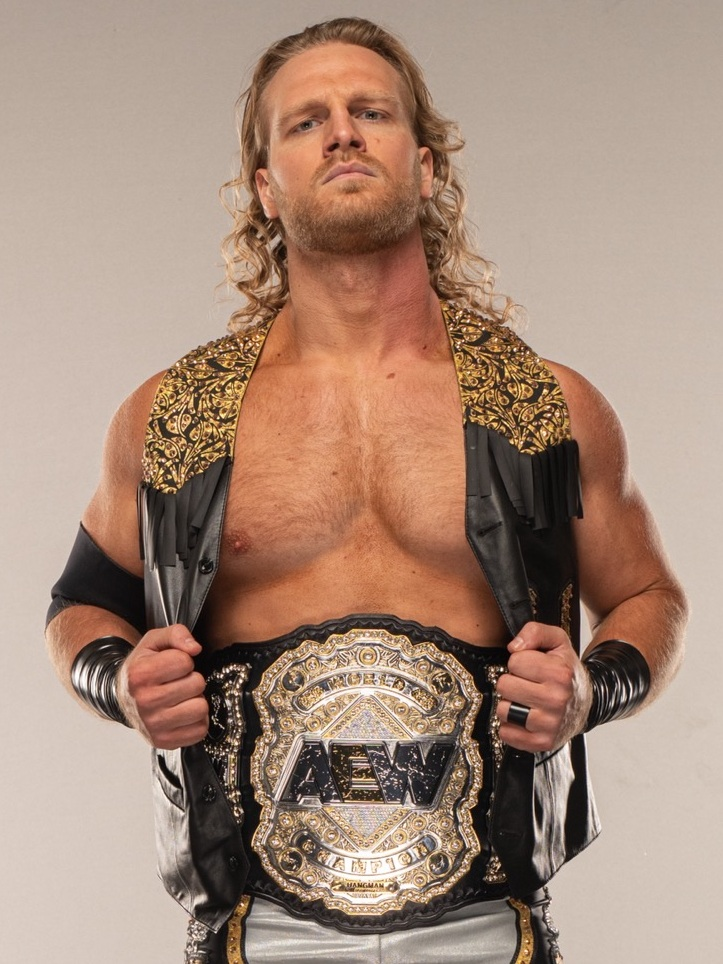
The predominant rivalry heading into Full Gear was between longest reigning champion Kenny Omega (left) and "Hangman" Adam Page (right) over the AEW World Championship.

In October 2018, prior to the formation of AEW, Adam Page joined his friends Kenny Omega and The Young Bucks (Matt Jackson and Nick Jackson), forming a group known as The Elite. In January 2020, Page and Omega won the AEW World Tag Team Championship, but lost it later that year. Signs of dissent occurred during this title reign, and after more months of tension within the group, Page was removed from The Elite by The Young Bucks on the August 27, 2020, episode of Dynamite, after Page had prevented them from winning a match. At the 2020 Full Gear event on November 7, Page faced Omega in the finals of a tournament to determine the number one contender for the AEW World Championship, with Omega winning. Omega would later go on to win the championship. Nearly a year later, on the October 6, 2021, episode of Dynamite, Page, won the Casino Ladder match to become the number one contender for the AEW World Championship, still held by Omega. On October 16, the championship match was scheduled for Full Gear.

On October 8, AEW announced the return of the AEW World Championship Eliminator Tournament; an eight-man single-elimination tournament culminating at Full Gear with the winner receiving a future AEW World Championship match. On the October 16 episode of Dynamite, Bryan Danielson, Orange Cassidy, Preston "10" Vance, Lance Archer, Jon Moxley, Eddie Kingston, Dustin Rhodes, and Powerhouse Hobbs were revealed as the participants. However, on November 2, Moxley was removed from the tournament after he entered a rehabilitation program for alcohol addiction, and was replaced by Miro.

After losing to Bryan Danielson on the October 29 episode of Rampage, an enraged Eddie Kingston confronted CM Punk while he was being interviewed backstage. On the following episode of Rampage, Kingston stated that although Punk had used to be a "hero" of his, he accused him of becoming "two-faced" and "narcissistic", with Punk responding that Kingston was a "bum". Kingston challenged Punk to a match at Full Gear, which was later confirmed.

== Event ==
Other on-screen personnel
Role	Name
Commentators	Jim Ross (PPV)
Commentators	Excalibur (Pre-show and PPV)
Commentators	Tony Schiavone (Pre-show and PPV)
Spanish commentators	Alex Abrahantes
Spanish commentators	Dasha Gonzalez
Spanish commentators	Ricardo Rodriguez
French commentators	Alain Mistrangélo
French commentators	Norbert Feuillan
German commentators	Günter Zapf
German commentators	Mike Ritter
Ring announcer	Justin Roberts
Referees	Aubrey Edwards
Referees	Bryce Remsburg
Referees	Paul Turner
Referees	Rick Knox

=== The Buy-In ===
On The Buy-In pre-show, Hikaru Shida and Thunder Rosa faced Jamie Hayter and Nyla Rose (accompanied by Vickie Guerrero). Shida was distracted by Serena Deeb, allowing Vickie to hit her with a kendo stick. Rosa took out Hayter to the floor. Back in the ring, Rose performed a Splash on Shida, but Rosa broke up the pinfall. In the end, Shida reversed a Beast Bomb from Rose with a roll-up to win the match.

=== Preliminary matches ===
The actual pay-per-view opened with MJF facing Darby Allin. When Allin attempted a Code Red, MJF reversed with a powerbomb kneebreaker. Both men were later on the apron, Allin went for a suplex; but MJF avoided it and performed a Tombstone Piledriver on Allin. Both men strived several roll-up attempts, with neither getting the pinfall. Moments later, Allin performed a Coffin Drop on MJF outside the ring. Back in the ring, Allin went for another Coffin Drop, but MJF got his knees up. Wardlow and Shawn Spears ran towards ringside, but Sting prevented them from intervening and attacked both men with his baseball bat. MJF went to ringside and grabbed Allin's skateboard. Allin would then grab the skateboard and hand it to the referee, which gave MJF enough time to struck Allin with his Dynamite Diamond Ring. MJF then performed a headlock takeover on Allin for the pinfall victory.

Next, The Lucha Brothers (Penta El Zero Miedo and Rey Fénix) (accompanied by Alex Abrahantes) defended the AEW World Tag Team Championship against FTR (Dax Harwood and Cash Wheeler) (accompanied by Tully Blanchard). Penta performed the Three Amigos on Harwood and Fénix followed up with a Frog Splash for a nearfall. FTR landed a Spike Piledriver on Fénix for a nearfall. In the closing moments, Wheeler tried to steal the win with a pin using the ropes, but the referee caught Wheeler's tactics. In the end, The Lucha Brothers performed a Fear Factor piledriver on Wheeler to retain the championships.

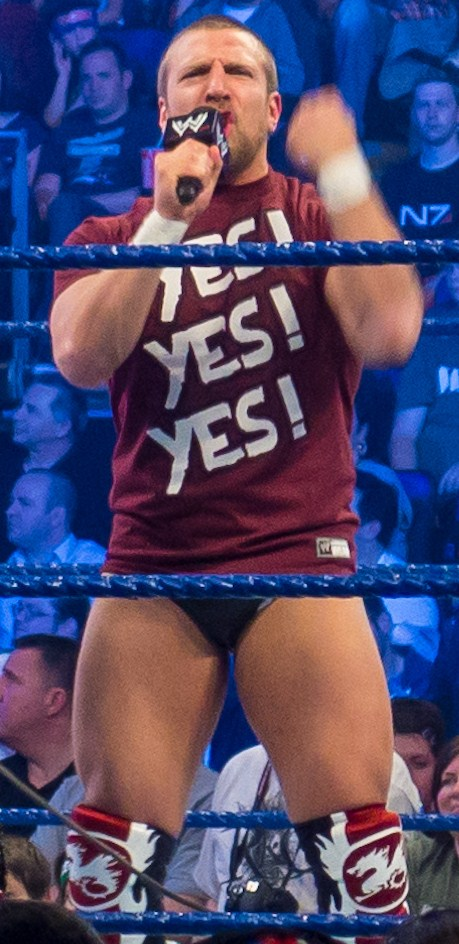
Bryan Danielson won the AEW World Championship Eliminator Tournament to earn a future AEW World Championship match.

The third match saw the AEW World Championship Eliminator Tournament final match between Bryan Danielson and Miro, with the winner receiving a future match for the AEW World Championship. During the match, Miro performed a Samoan Drop on Danielson for a nearfall. The latter landed a shotgun missile dropkick off the top rope. Miro tossed Bryan with a release German Suplex after both men got to their feet. As Danielson went for a Busaiku Knee, Miro countered with a Powerbomb. Miro then applied the Game Over submission, but Danielson crawled to the ropes and broke the hold. Danielson performed a DDT off the top rope, and applied the Guillotine Choke submission on Miro, who passed out; thus Danielson won via technical submission.

Following this was a Falls Count Anywhere match between the team of Christian Cage and Jurassic Express (Jungle Boy and Luchasaurus) against The Superkliq (Adam Cole and The Young Bucks (Matt Jackson and Nick Jackson)) (accompanied by Brandon Cutler and Michael Nakazawa). Cage hit Cole with a reverse DDT on a steel chair. Nick followed with a bulldog to Cage, Luchasaurus then landed a knee strike on the latter and performed a German Suplex on The Young Bucks. The latter poured thumbtacks in Boy's mouth and ran the ropes to kiss Cole on the cheek, followed by a double superkick on Boy for a nearfall. The Superkliq landed a BTE Trigger on Luchasaurus, but Boy broke up the pin. Boy performed a German Suplex on Nick, Christian followed with a Spear on Matt, and Luchasaurus performed a chokeslam on Cole off the stage onto Nick, Cutler, and Nakazawa. In the end, Boy performed a conchairto on Matt for the pinfall victory.

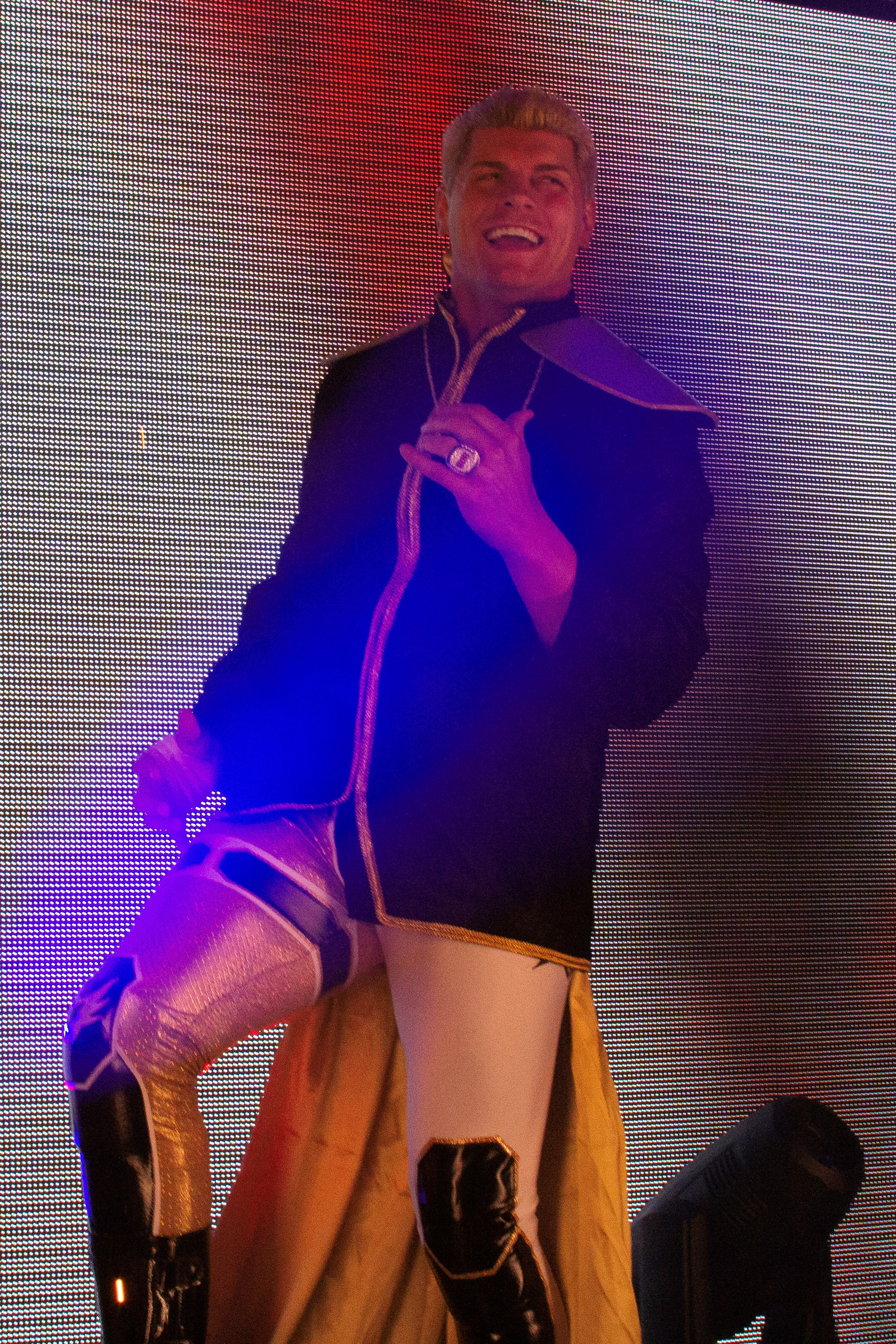
Cody Rhodes teamed up with Pac against Malakai Black and Andrade El Idolo in his final AEW PPV appearance.

Next, Cody Rhodes and Pac (accompanied by Arn Anderson) faced Andrade El Idolo and Malakai Black (accompanied by Jose the Assistant). During the match, Pac performed an asai moonsault on Andrade and Black outside the ring. Black tagged in Rhodes, who performed a reverse superplex on Andrade off the top rope. Andrade went for a Figure Four Leglock, but Rhodes applied the move on Andrade instead. Black and Rhodes brawled into the crowd, which allowed Pac to take control and perform the Black Arrow on Andrade to win the match.

The sixth match saw Dr. Britt Baker, D.M.D. (accompanied by Rebel and Jamie Hayter) defending the AEW Women's World Championship against Tay Conti. Conti attempted a quick roll-up for a nearfall. Baker performed a Curb Stomp on Conti for a nearfall. Baker applied her glove, but walked into a cutter from Conti for a nearfall. Baker performed an Air Raid Crash slam on Conti through the apron. While Rebel distracted the referee, Hayter pulled Conti out of the ring and threw her into the steel steps. Back in the ring, Baker performed another Curb Stomp and applied the Lockjaw submission on Conti, who broke the hold. Both women rolled around into pinfall attempts, and Baker won with a cradle pin to retain the title.

After this, CM Punk faced Eddie Kingston. Kingston struck Punk with a spinning back fist before the match began. Both men spilled to the floor and brawled at ringside. Back in the ring, Kingston performed an exploder suplex on Punk. They went outside again where Kingston shoved Punk into the ring post, so Punk was busted open. Kingston attempted a Piledriver on the floor, but Punk countered into a back body drop. Punk dove off the apron for a diving clothesline, and tossed Kingston back in the ring. Kingston rained down punches on Punk on the top rope, and performed a superplex on the latter. In the end, Punk performed the Go to Sleep on Kingston to win the match.

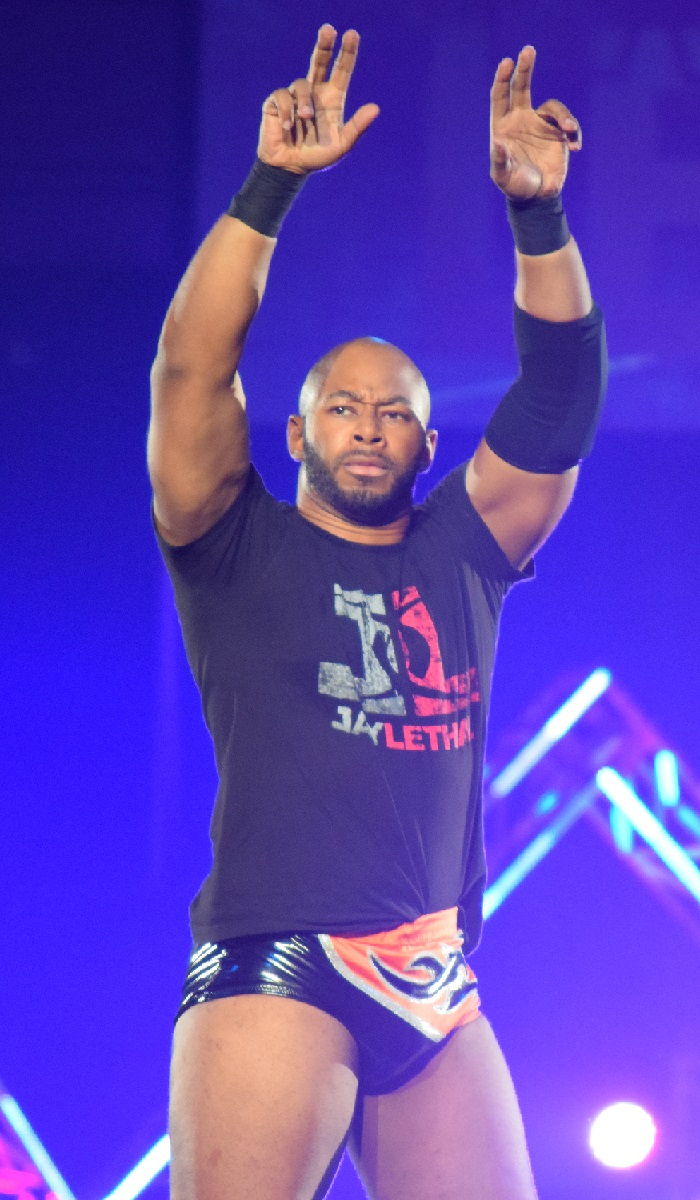
Jay Lethal made his debut at the event, challenging reigning champion Sammy Guevara on the following episode of Dynamite.

In the penultimate match, The Inner Circle (Chris Jericho, Jake Hager, Sammy Guevara, Santana and Ortiz) faced Men of the Year (Ethan Page and Scorpio Sky) and American Top Team (Junior dos Santos, Andrei Arlovski, and Dan Lambert) in a Minneapolis Street Fight match. Guevara leapt off the ladder and performed a Swanton Bomb on Sky through a table. Page gave Ortiz an Ego's Edge on the floor in front of Baron Von Raschke, who applied the Iron Claw on him. Lambert celebrated in the ring, Jericho appeared behind him and landed multiple chops. Lambert went for the Walls of Jericho, but Jericho hit him with a kendo stick. In the culmination, Jericho performed a Frog Splash on Lambert for the victory.

Post-match, Tony Schiavone stood on the stage to introduce a special guest. Jay Lethal made his unannounced AEW debut, officially joining AEW. Lethal then challenged Sammy Guevara to a match for the AEW TNT Championship on the following episode of Dynamite, which Guevara accepted.

=== Main event ===
In the main event, Kenny Omega (accompanied by Don Callis) defended the AEW World Championship against "Hangman" Adam Page. Throughout the match, Callis would intervene and attack Page with the referee's vision concealed. Omega leapt off the ropes and performed a powerbomb on Page for a nearfall. Page landed a release German Suplex, which Omega would reply with a Tiger Driver '98. He then went for a Buckshot Lariat, but Omega pulled the referee in the way of the strike. Callis grabbed the AEW World Championship belt, and tried to hit Page with it. The latter saw it coming, and knocked out Callis. Omega grabbed the belt, but Page avoided it and performed a Dead Eye. A new referee ran to the ring, and counted a nearfall. Omega landed Kawada kicks, and Page fired up and landed a lariat on Omega. The Young Bucks (Matt Jackson and Nick Jackson) then slowly made their way down to the ringside. Hangman attempted for another Buckshot Lariat, but Omega intercepted it with a V-Trigger. Omega went for a One Winged Angel, but Hangman performed the move on Omega himself for a nearfall. Page finally landed a Buckshot Lariat to the back of Omega. When Page set up the Buckshot Lariat from the front, Matt nodded at Page; reminiscent of the latter costing The Young Bucks an AEW World Tag Team Championship opportunity at All Out in 2020. In the climax, Page performed a second Buckshot Lariat on Omega to win the title. Following the match, Page celebrated his championship victory with the members of The Dark Order.

== Reception ==
Full Gear received critical acclaim from critics. Writing for Sports Illustrated, Justin Barrasso enjoyed the event and thought there was "a lot to like". Barrasso thought the MJF-Darby Allin opening match was "phenomenal" and the "match of the night". Barrasso also wrote that the Page-Omega main event was "captivating", the CM Punk-Kingston match was "short but dramatic", and the Lucha Brothers-FTR tag team championship match was "outstanding".

Brent Brookhouse of CBS Sports thought Full Gear was "incredible" and considered it to be "one of the best events in the young history of the promotion". The main event match was "fantastic", MJF-Allin was a "thriller", Lucha Brothers-FTR was "great", Danielson-Miro was "really good", and CM Punk-Kingston was "a wonderfully told story". He gave minor criticism to the Pac-Rhodes vs. Black-Andrade tag team match, which "wasn't up to the standards of the rest of the show", and The Inner Circle-American Top Team match, which was a "difficult match to rate".

Sports journalist Dave Meltzer for the Wrestling Observer Newsletter assigned star ratings to the event, with the main event receiving a 5 1/2 rating, making it the tenth AEW match to be rated 5 stars or more by Meltzer, and the fifth to surpass his 5 star rating scale. The falls count anywhere match between Christian Cage and Jurassic Express and The Superkliq was also rated 5 stars, making Full Gear the first AEW event to feature more than one match to attain the rating. Elsewhere on the card, MJF-Allin, CM Punk-Kingston, and Danielson-Miro all received 4 1/2 star ratings. The lowest rated match of the night was Baker-Conti, which was allocated 3 1/2 stars.

Brandon Thurston of Wrestlenomics approximated that Full Gear had received 145,000 pay-per-view buys and had sold 10,442 tickets, generating an estimated $4 million of revenue in total.

== Results ==
No.	Results	Stipulations	Times
1^{P}	Hikaru Shida and Thunder Rosa defeated Jamie Hayter and Nyla Rose (with Vickie Guerrero) by pinfall	Tag team match	12:32
2	MJF defeated Darby Allin by pinfall	Singles match	22:01
3	The Lucha Brothers (Penta El Zero Miedo and Rey Fénix) (c) (with Alex Abrahantes) defeated FTR (Dax Harwood and Cash Wheeler) (with Tully Blanchard) by pinfall	Tag team match for the AEW World Tag Team Championship	18:36
4	Bryan Danielson defeated Miro by technical submission	AEW World Championship Eliminator Tournament Final; Winner received a future AEW World Championship match.	20:00
5	Christian Cage and Jurassic Express (Jungle Boy and Luchasaurus) defeated The Superkliq (Adam Cole and The Young Bucks (Nick Jackson and Matt Jackson)) (with Brandon Cutler and Michael Nakazawa) by pinfall	Falls Count Anywhere match	22:20
6	Cody Rhodes and Pac (with Arn Anderson) defeated Malakai Black and Andrade El Idolo (with José the Assistant) by pinfall	Tag team match	16:51
7	Dr. Britt Baker, D.M.D. (c) (with Rebel and Jamie Hayter) defeated Tay Conti by pinfall	Singles match for the AEW Women's World Championship	15:24
8	CM Punk defeated Eddie Kingston by pinfall	Singles match	11:08
9	The Inner Circle (Chris Jericho, Jake Hager, Sammy Guevara, Santana and Ortiz) defeated Men of the Year (Ethan Page and Scorpio Sky) and American Top Team (Junior dos Santos, Andrei Arlovski, and Dan Lambert) by pinfall	Minneapolis Street Fight	19:36
10	"Hangman" Adam Page defeated Kenny Omega (c) (with Don Callis) by pinfall	Singles match for the AEW World Championship; This was Page's Casino Poker Chip cash-in match.	25:30
(c) / – the champion(s) heading into the match; P / – the match was broadcast on the pre-show

=== AEW World Championship Eliminator Tournament ===
Quarterfinals; Rampage (October 22, 2021); Dynamite (October 23 and 27, 2021)
Jon Moxley	Pin
Preston "10" Vance	2:09
Orange Cassidy	Pin
Powerhouse Hobbs	8:10
Bryan Danielson	KO
Dustin Rhodes	14:45
Eddie Kingston	Pin
Lance Archer	7:31

Semifinals; Rampage (October 29, 2021); Dynamite (November 3, 2021)
Miro (Note: Jon Moxley was originally scheduled to face Orange Cassidy on the November 3 episode of Dynamite, but Moxley was removed from the match after legitimately entering an alcohol treatment program. During the show, Miro was announced as his replacement.)	Sub
Orange Cassidy	7:27
Bryan Danielson	KO
Eddie Kingston	16:24

Final; Full Gear (November 13, 2021)
Miro	20:00
Bryan Danielson	KO

== See also ==
- 2021 in professional wrestling
- List of All Elite Wrestling pay-per-view events
