= All Out (2020) =

All Elite Wrestling pay-per-view event

- Promotional poster featuring Jon Moxley, "Hangman" Adam Page, Cody, Kenny Omega, Hikaru Shida, and Brian Cage
- Promotion: All Elite Wrestling
- Date: September 5, 2020
- City: Jacksonville, Florida; Winter Park, Florida (Note: The Tooth and Nail match between Big Swole and Dr. Britt Baker, D.M.D. was pre-taped prior to the event at Baker's real-life dental clinic in Winter Park, Florida.)
- Venue: Daily's Place
- Attendance: 700–750
- Buy rate: 100,000–110,000

Pay-per-view chronology
← Previous; Double or Nothing	Next → Full Gear

All Out chronology
← Previous; 2019	Next → 2021

The 2020 All Out was the second annual All Out professional wrestling pay-per-view (PPV) event produced by All Elite Wrestling (AEW). It was broadcast during Labor Day weekend on September 5, 2020. While the majority of the event aired live from Daily's Place in Jacksonville, Florida, the Tooth and Nail match between Dr. Britt Baker, D.M.D. and Big Swole was pre-taped prior to the event at Baker's real-life dental clinic in Winter Park, Florida. The event aired through traditional PPV outlets, as well as on B/R Live in North America and FITE TV internationally.

The event was originally slated to take place at the Sears Centre Arena in the Chicago suburb of Hoffman Estates, Illinois, where the previous edition of All Out was held. Illinois Governor J. B. Pritzker issued a disaster proclamation, the state's equivalent to a state of emergency, since March 9, which banned large public gatherings due to the COVID-19 pandemic that affected the state. As a result, the event was moved to Daily's Place, where all of AEW's events had been held since March. This was the first AEW PPV to have ticketed fans since Revolution in February, although the capacity of the venue was reduced due to the pandemic. Also due to the pandemic, this was the only All Out event to not take place in the Chicago metropolitan area, until All Out 2025, which occurred in Toronto, Canada.

Eleven matches were contested at the event, including two on The Buy In pre-show. In the main event, Jon Moxley defeated MJF to retain the AEW World Championship. In the penultimate match, Orange Cassidy defeated Chris Jericho in a Mimosa Mayhem match. In other prominent matches, FTR (Cash Wheeler and Dax Harwood) defeated Kenny Omega and Adam Page to win the AEW World Tag Team Championship, Hikaru Shida retained the AEW Women's World Championship in an interpromotional match against Thunder Rosa of the National Wrestling Alliance (NWA), and Matt Hardy defeated Sammy Guevara in a Broken Rules match.

The event was met with mixed to negative reviews, in contrast to the praise that AEW's previous PPV events had received. Criticism was mainly focused on an accident that occurred in the match between Hardy and Guevara in which Guevara speared Hardy from a scissor lift through a table, accidentally causing Hardy to legitimately hit his head on the concrete floor underneath the table; he appeared to be knocked out and the match was paused, but Hardy was then allowed to continue the match. The accident notably led to AEW adding new protocols in case a similar incident happens, with referees gaining the ability to use two-way communication to call medical staff and stop matches when necessary. Criticism was also directed towards much of the undercard, but the three championship matches on the show were generally well received.

== Production ==
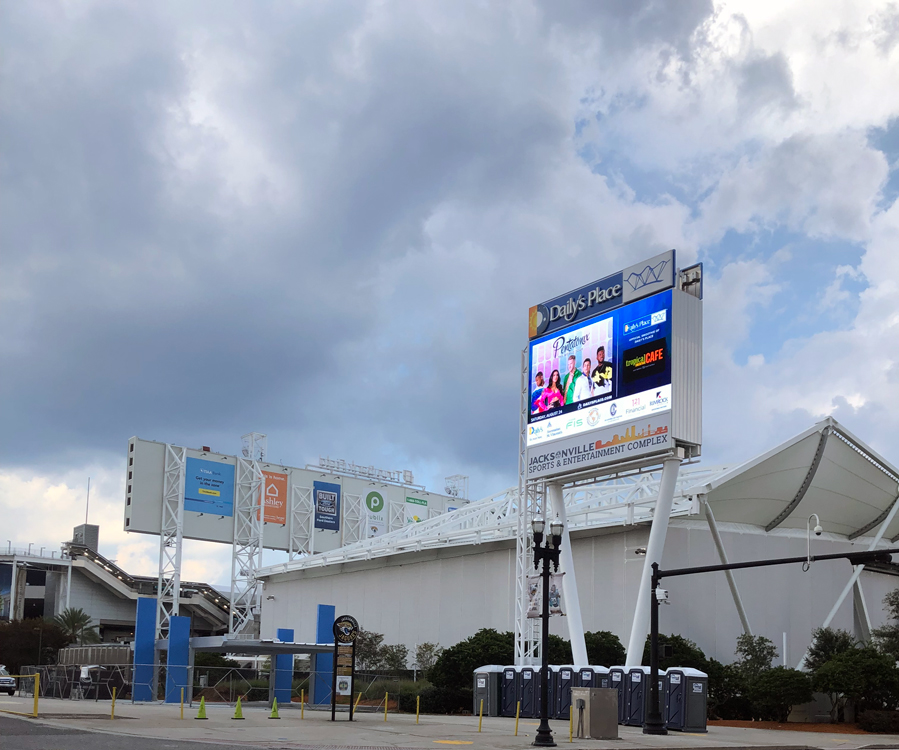
Due to the COVID-19 pandemic, the majority of the event was held at Daily's Place in Jacksonville, Florida

=== Background ===
On August 31, 2019, the American professional wrestling promotion All Elite Wrestling (AEW) held a pay-per-view (PPV) event titled All Out during Labor Day weekend. The event was a spiritual sequel to the September 2018 independently produced All In show, an event that led to the foundation of AEW in January 2019. While AEW President and Chief Executive Officer Tony Khan had stated that there would be a second All Out event, it was not officially announced until the 2020 Double or Nothing PPV in May when a second All Out show was announced as occurring during that year's Labor Day weekend on Saturday, September 5, 2020, thus establishing All Out as an annual Labor Day weekend event for AEW. Khan later stated that All Out was considered as one of AEW's "Big Four" PPVs, which includes Double or Nothing, Full Gear, and Revolution, their four biggest domestic shows produced quarterly. On September 5, AEW aired an All Out Red Carpet Special and The Buy-In Pre-show on their YouTube channel. Also on September 5, TNT aired a one-hour television special called Countdown to All Out which averaged 357,000 viewers.

==== Impact of the COVID-19 pandemic ====
All Out was originally scheduled to take place at the Sears Centre Arena (renamed to Now Arena on September 1) in the Chicago suburb of Hoffman Estates, Illinois on September 5, 2020, the same venue as the original show and All In before that. Due to the COVID-19 pandemic, the state of Illinois banned gatherings up to 50 people on March 17, amidst a March 9 declaration of a state of emergency. A report from the Wrestling Observer Newsletter noted that Illinois Governor J. B. Pritzker announced that larger events and conventions would not be allowed until there was a COVID-19 vaccine. Due to the circumstances, AEW presented most of its programming and pay-per-view broadcasts at Daily's Place in Jacksonville, Florida with no fans in attendance since the March 18 episode of Dynamite; AEW instead used non-competing wrestlers and other employees to serve as the live audience. On August 21, AEW began selling a limited number of tickets for events (10–15% capacity of the venue), allowing spectators to again attend shows, though with groups separated into their own pods in the upper balcony and face coverings required. On August 29, AEW announced that tickets for All Out would be available, thus marking All Out as AEW's first PPV to have live ticketed fans, though only at 15% of the venue's capacity.

=== Storylines ===
All Out featured professional wrestling matches that involved different wrestlers from pre-existing scripted feuds and storylines. Storylines were produced on AEW's weekly television program, Dynamite, the supplementary online streaming show, Dark, and The Young Bucks' YouTube series Being The Elite.

On the July 29 episode of Dynamite, #1 ranked MJF, who had never been pinned or submitted in singles competition, began a presidential election-style campaign to become the next AEW World Champion and held a "State of the Industry" address. He said that it was now time for a new guard and that the old guard, referring to champion Jon Moxley, was failing as a leader to lead by example, and that he would be the one to lead AEW for the next 25 years. MJF finished the speech by challenging Moxley, who also had never been pinned or submitted in singles competition, for the AEW World Championship at All Out. A few days later, it was announced that MJF would face the winner of a title match between Moxley and #5 ranked, Darby Allin, for the title at All Out. On the August 5 episode of Dynamite, despite MJF attacking him with the championship belt during the match, Moxley defeated Allin to retain the championship, keeping Moxley as the defending champion against MJF at All Out. On the August 27 episode, a contract signing for the match occurred and a stipulation was added in which Moxley could not use the Paradigm Shift. Another clause was also added into the contract in which MJF's lawyer, Mark Sterling, had to face Moxley in a match the following week or else MJF would not receive his title match at All Out. The following week, although unsuccessful against Moxley, Sterling faced Moxley in order for MJF to have his title match.

On night 2 of Fyter Fest on July 8, Chris Jericho defeated Orange Cassidy. Cassidy then wanted a rematch with Jericho, who eventually accepted after repeated attacks from Cassidy, including staining his white jacket with orange juice. Following a debate between the two that was hosted by Eric Bischoff, the two had their rematch on the August 12 episode of Dynamite that Cassidy won. The following week, Jericho said that since they were tied, they needed to have one more match and he challenged Cassidy to a Mimosa Mayhem match at All Out, which could be won by pinfall, submission, or by throwing the opponent into a vat of mimosa. After Cassidy accepted the challenge, he was attacked by Jericho and The Inner Circle.

On the August 22 episode of Dynamite, NWA World Women's Champion Thunder Rosa appeared for the first time in AEW and challenged Hikaru Shida to a match for the AEW Women's World Championship at All Out, saying that she wanted to bring the AEW women's division some respect. It was then confirmed on the August 27 episode that Shida would defend the title against Rosa at All Out.

On the August 22 episode of Dynamite, it was announced that four teams would take part in a Tag Team Gauntlet Match on the following show to determine who would challenge the AEW World Tag Team Champions, "Hangman" Adam Page and Kenny Omega, to a title match at All Out. On the August 27 episode, #1 ranked FTR (Cash Wheeler and Dax Harwood) won the Gauntlet match by last eliminating #2 ranked Best Friends (Chuck Taylor and Trent) to earn the title match at All Out. #4 ranked The Natural Nightmares (Dustin Rhodes and Q. T. Marshall) and #3 ranked The Young Bucks (Matt Jackson and Nick Jackson) also took part in the Gauntlet match. During the match, Adam Page betrayed The Young Bucks by stopping Nick Jackson from breaking a pin on Matt Jackson. The Young Bucks, in turn, removed him from The Elite, of which Page's tag partner, Kenny Omega, is still a member.

On the August 27 episode of Dynamite, the Casino Battle Royale was announced to be occurring at All Out, with the winner receiving a future title match for the AEW World Championship. During the same episode, Darby Allin, Lance Archer, Brian Cage, Ricky Starks, Penta El Zero M, Ray Fénix, The Butcher and The Blade, and Eddie Kingston were announced as the first nine participants. On the September 2 episode of Dynamite, Austin Gunn, Billy, Jake Hager, Ortiz, Shawn Spears, and Best Friends (Chuck Taylor and Trent) were also announced for the battle royal. The remaining four participants were revealed at the event.

== Event ==
Other on-screen personnel
Role	Name
Commentators	Jim Ross (PPV)
Commentators	Excalibur (Pre-show and PPV)
Commentators	Tony Schiavone (Pre-show and PPV)
Commentators	Taz (Casino Battle Royale)
Spanish-language commentators	Alex Abrahantes
Spanish-language commentators	Dasha Gonzalez
Spanish-language commentators	Willie Urbina
German-language commentators	Günter Zapf
German-language commentators	Mike Ritter
French-language commentators	Alain Mistrangélo
French-language commentators	Norbert Feuillan
Ring announcer	Justin Roberts
Referees	Aubrey Edwards
Referees	Bryce Remsburg
Referees	Mike Posey
Referees	Paul Turner
Referees	Rick Knox
Interviewer	Alex Marvez

=== The Buy In ===
Before the event officially started, two matches were contested on the Buy In pre-show. In the first of these matches, Joey Janela (accompanied by Sonny Kiss) faced Serpentico (accompanied by Luther). Janela won after performing a "Top Rope Elbow Drop" on Serpentico.

The second and final match on the pre-show saw Private Party (Marq Quen and Isiah Kassidy) face The Dark Order (Alex Reynolds and John Silver) (accompanied by 5 and 10). Private Party won the match after Kassidy pinned Silver.

=== Preliminary matches ===
The pay-per-view opened with Britt Baker (accompanied by Rebel) facing Big Swole in a Tooth and Nail match. The pre-taped match, conducted as a cinematic match, took place at Baker's real-life dental clinic in Winter Park, Florida. Swole won the match after placing a laughing gas mask on Baker, causing her to pass out and allowing Swole to be declared the victor.

After that, The Young Bucks (Matt Jackson and Nick Jackson) took on Jurassic Express (Luchasaurus and Jungle Boy, accompanied by Marko Stunt). In the end, The Young Bucks performed the BTE Trigger on Jungle Boy to win the match.

The next match was the 21-man Casino Battle Royale to determine the next challenger for the AEW World Championship. Matt Sydal was the "joker" entrant, but botched his shooting star press move and landed on the back of his head. Brian Cage retrieved a body bag filled with thumbtacks and placed Darby Allin in it before powerbombing him out of the ring to eliminate Allin. The final two were Eddie Kingston and Lance Archer. The Butcher and The Blade interfered, but Jake Roberts appeared with a bag containing a snake. This allowed Archer to eliminate Kingston to win the match.

The following match was a Broken Rules match between Matt Hardy and Sammy Guevara. The rules were: The winner will be the Last Man Standing, determined when one man can not answer the referee's 10 count, falls count anywhere, there must be a winner (no draws), and if Hardy were to lose this match, he would be forced to leave AEW. Midway through the match, Hardy and Guevara fell from the top of a scissor lift through a table, with Hardy's head crashing against the concrete floor, knocking him unconscious. The match was initially called off, but was later resumed after it was determined that he could continue. Hardy and Guevara then climbed to the top of a scaffold. Guevara was thrown off the scaffold onto a platform below, and did not get up before the count of ten, meaning Hardy won the match.

In the next match, Hikaru Shida defended the AEW Women's World Championship against Thunder Rosa. In the climax, Shida performed a "Running Knee" to win the match and retain the championship.

Next, The Dark Order (Brodie Lee, Colt Cabana, Evil Uno and Stu Grayson) (accompanied by Alan Angels) faced Scorpio Sky, Matt Cardona and The Natural Nightmares (Dustin Rhodes and Q. T. Marshall) (accompanied by Allie and Brandi Rhodes) in an eight-man tag team match. Rhodes pinned Cabana with a roll-up to win the match for his team.

Afterwards, Kenny Omega and Adam Page defended the AEW World Tag Team Championship against FTR (Cash Wheeler and Dax Harwood). FTR performed two "Mindbreakers" on Page to win the match and championship. After the match, Omega abandoned an injured and exhausted Page as he walked backstage and left the arena in frustration.

In the penultimate match, Chris Jericho faced Orange Cassidy in a Mimosa Mayhem match, where the only way to win was by pinfall, submission or by knocking the opponent into a vat of mimosa. In the end of the match, Orange Cassidy performed a "Pulp Punch" to Jericho, who was on the top rope, which knocked him into the mimosa and giving Cassidy the win.

=== Main event ===
In the main event, Jon Moxley defended the AEW World Championship against MJF (accompanied by Wardlow). In this match, Moxley's finishing move, the Paradigm Shift, was banned from being used. In the match's climax, however, Moxley performed the Paradigm Shift on MJF while the referee was distracted to win the match and retain the championship.

== Reception ==
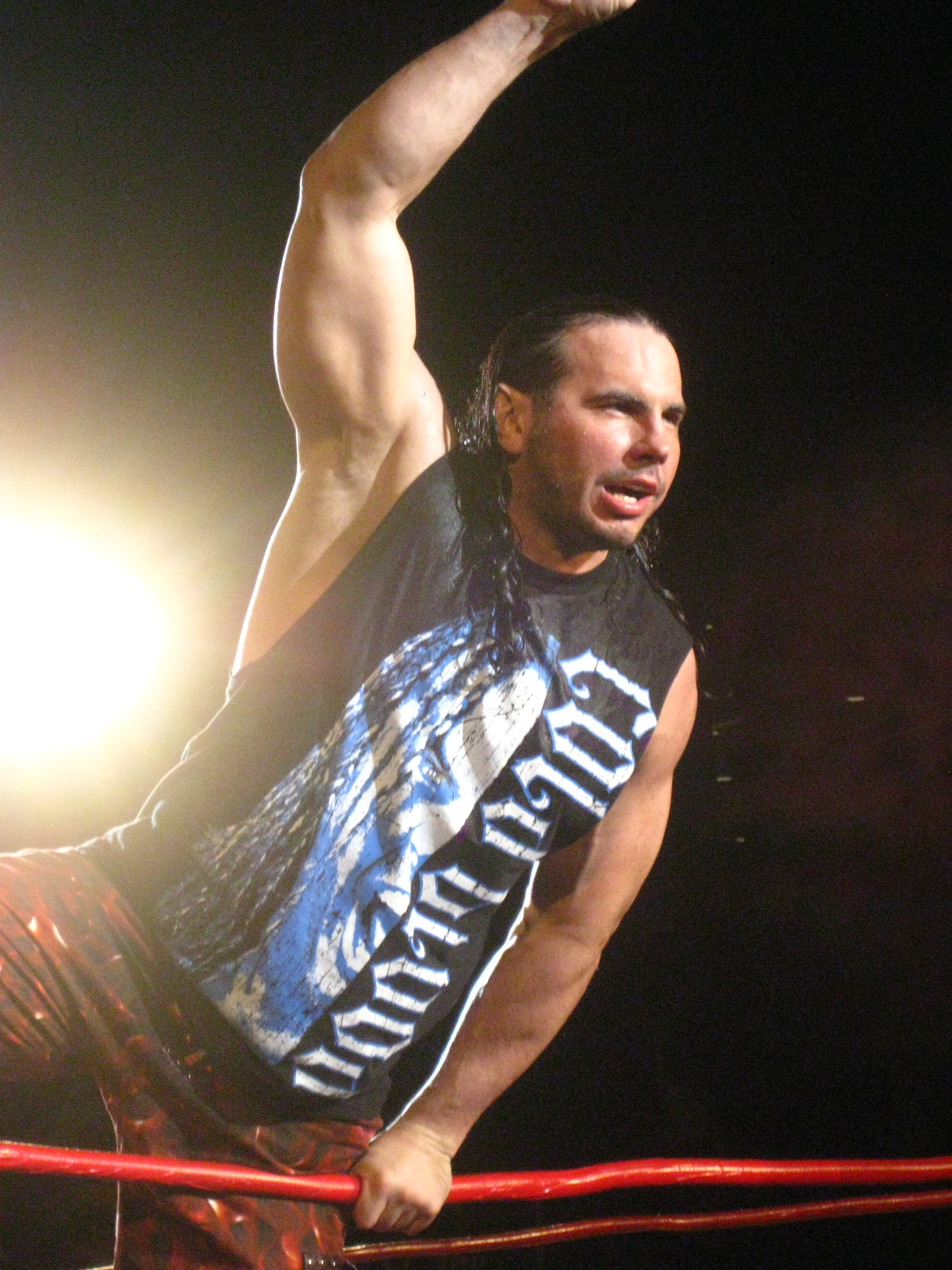
All Out received generally poor reviews from critics, mainly due to an accident involving Matt Hardy (pictured) during his match with Sammy Guevara

All Out received mixed to negative reviews from fans and critics. Justin Barrasso of Sports Illustrated reviewed the show, saying that "tonight’s All Out show did not meet that high standard of excellence, running into a litany of obstacles that included no singles title change, a limited live crowd dealing with intense humidity and a nearly disastrous spot involving Matt Hardy". Brent Brookhouse of CBS Sports said that "while AEW All Out may have ended with a bang in the form of a competitive and entertaining world title match, the lasting memories from the show will likely be the things that did not go as planned. And, for the first time in company history, a pay-per-view event can be viewed as largely disappointing". Will Pruett of Pro Wrestling Dot Net declared it as AEW's "first bad pay-per-view".

Much criticism was given to the poor handling of Matt Hardy's injury during his match with Sammy Guevara (see aftermath section). During the All Out post-show media scrum, Tony Khan spoke about the decision to initially stop the match, saying that "Matt had taken a fall in the match, and I stopped the match, paused the match, and sent the doctor to check on him. I was concerned that Matt could be hurt, so I rang the bell to stop the match". When asked about Dr. Michael Sampson's decision to let Hardy continue, Khan said that "when the doctor checked on him, the doctor passed him and cleared him on the protocol." He then added that "there was a good amount of time [to make that decision]. The doctor did clear him. Matt did not pressure him, and Dr. [Michael] Sampson would not be pressured into clearing anybody. He's pulled people from our shows without hesitation, whether it's been something with a blood test or with an injury. He's really strict about that stuff, and that's why when people have had injuries and he didn't feel comfortable about people doing physicality or wrestling, we never put those people out there. I never would have gone against the doctor's decision, and most importantly, Matt would not have been able to overrule the doctor's decision, not with the doctor himself or with me. That is what happened. The doctor cleared him, which is the first and foremost important thing. Matt also did want to continue, but the doctor cleared him".

== Aftermath ==
Hardy was injured during his Broken Rules match against Guevara after Guevara speared him from a scissor lift through a table, causing Hardy's head to hit the concrete floor underneath the table. The incident appeared to knock Hardy out and caused the match to be temporarily suspended. Although the match was eventually restarted, Hardy was taken to a hospital for further evaluation after the match had concluded. Hardy passed MRI and CT scans, was not diagnosed with a concussion, and was released from the hospital the following day. He appeared on the following episode of Dynamite to address the incident. He stated that he is expected to make a 100% full recovery and would be taking some time off until he is cleared to return. He said his vendetta with Guevara was over and that when he returns, he would be setting his sights on winning his first AEW championship.

All Elite Wrestling responded by adding new protocols in case a similar incident happens. Referees are now able to use two-way communication with medical staff to call medical staff when necessary and stop matches. The procedure was changed shortly after All Out, but was formally announced just before the next pay-per-view. AEW used the protocol to abandon an October 22 Dynamite match between Abadon and Taynara Conti was being taped for the subsequent (October 28) episode (during pandemic restrictions, AEW frequently did one live show and taped the next episode the next afternoon, giving staff 12 days between episodes). Abadon caught an elbow from Conti to the throat and had difficulty breathing, leading to the formal stoppage where Abadon was hospitalized. The match was declared a no-contest and edited out of the final broadcast, as it was during a Thursday taping. Similarly, during an October 18, 2022, episode of Dynamite, referee Paul Turner is seen pressing a button to call medical staff after a lariat led to "Hangman" Adam Page being injured in his match against Jon Moxley for the AEW World Championship. The staff came out immediately and ended the match.

On the following episode of Dynamite, it was announced that Lance Archer would receive his AEW World Championship match against Jon Moxley on the October 14 special anniversary episode of Dynamite.

== Results ==
No.	Results	Stipulations	Times
1^{P}	Joey Janela (with Sonny Kiss) defeated Serpentico (with Luther)	Singles match	7:35
2^{P}	Private Party (Isiah Kassidy and Marq Quen) defeated The Dark Order (Alex Reynolds and John Silver)	Tag team match	10:25
3	Big Swole defeated Dr. Britt Baker, D.M.D. (with Rebel) by knockout	Tooth and Nail match	10:00
4	The Young Bucks (Matt Jackson and Nick Jackson) defeated Jurassic Express (Jungle Boy and Luchasaurus) (with Marko Stunt)	Tag team match	14:50
5	Lance Archer won by last eliminating Eddie Kingston	21-man Casino Battle Royale for a future AEW World Championship match	22:15
6	Matt Hardy defeated Sammy Guevara by knockout	Broken Rules match If Hardy lost, he would have had to leave AEW.	9:00
7	Hikaru Shida (c) defeated Thunder Rosa	Singles match for the AEW Women's World Championship	17:00
8	Matt Cardona, Scorpio Sky, and The Natural Nightmares (Dustin Rhodes and Q. T. Marshall) (with Allie and Brandi Rhodes) defeated The Dark Order (Mr. Brodie Lee, Colt Cabana, Evil Uno, and Stu Grayson) (with Anna Jay)	Eight-man tag team match	15:10
9	FTR (Cash Wheeler and Dax Harwood) (with Tully Blanchard) defeated Kenny Omega and "Hangman" Adam Page (c)	Tag team match for the AEW World Tag Team Championship	29:40
10	Orange Cassidy defeated Chris Jericho by submerging him into a vat of mimosa	Mimosa Mayhem match Match could be won by pinfall, submission, or fully submerging an opponent into a vat of mimosa.	15:15
11	Jon Moxley (c) defeated MJF (with Wardlow)	Singles match for the AEW World Championship; Moxley was banned from using the Deathrider.	23:40
(c) / – the champion(s) heading into the match; P / – the match was broadcast on the pre-show

=== Casino Battle Royale entrances and eliminations ===
Draw	Entrant	Order	Eliminated by	Eliminations
Clubs	Trent Beretta	9	Lance Archer	1
Clubs	Christopher Daniels	2	Jake Hager	0
Clubs	Jake Hager	6	Sonny Kiss	1
Clubs	The Blade	1	Will Hobbs	0
Clubs	Rey Fenix	4	Darby Allin	0
Diamonds	Frankie Kazarian	12	The Butcher	1
Diamonds	Will Hobbs	16	Lance Archer	1
Diamonds	Chuck Taylor	5	Santana and Ortiz	0
Diamonds	Santana	8	Trent	1
Diamonds	Ortiz	10	Lance Archer	1
Hearts	Billy	3	Brian Cage	0
Hearts	Penta El Zero M	11	Frankie Kazarian	0
Hearts	Ricky Starks	13	Darby Allin	0
Hearts	Brian Cage	17	Lance Archer	3
Hearts	Darby Allin	14	Brian Cage	2
Spades	Shawn Spears	15	Matt Sydal	0
Spades	Eddie Kingston	20	Lance Archer	1
Spades	The Butcher	18	Matt Sydal	1
Spades	Sonny Kiss	7	Brian Cage	1
Spades	Lance Archer	-	Winner	5
Joker	Matt Sydal	19	Eddie Kingston	2

== See also ==
- 2020 in professional wrestling
- List of All Elite Wrestling pay-per-view events
