= All Out (2019) =

All Elite Wrestling pay-per-view event

- Promotional poster featuring Hangman Page, Chris Jericho, Cody, Shawn Spears, and Tully Blanchard
- Promotion: All Elite Wrestling
- Date: August 31, 2019
- City: Hoffman Estates, Illinois
- Venue: Sears Centre Arena
- Attendance: 10,500
- Buy rate: 101,000

Pay-per-view chronology
← Previous; Fight for the Fallen	Next → Full Gear

All Out chronology
← Previous; First	Next → 2020

The 2019 All Out was the inaugural All Out professional wrestling pay-per-view (PPV) event produced by All Elite Wrestling (AEW). It took place during Labor Day weekend on August 31, 2019, at the Sears Centre Arena in the Chicago suburb of Hoffman Estates, Illinois. The event is considered the spiritual sequel to the independently produced All In PPV held in September 2018 at the same venue, which was the catalyst to the formation of AEW in January 2019. The event aired through traditional PPV outlets, as well as on B/R Live in North America and FITE TV internationally.

Ten matches were contested at the event, including two on the pre-show. In the main event, Chris Jericho defeated Adam Page to become the inaugural AEW World Champion. In other prominent matches, the Lucha Brothers (Pentagón Jr. and Rey Fénix) defeated The Young Bucks (Matt Jackson and Nick Jackson) in a ladder match to retain the AAA World Tag Team Championship, Cody defeated Shawn Spears, and Pac defeated Kenny Omega by referee stoppage. The AEW Women's World Championship belt was also unveiled with Nyla Rose and Riho winning their respective matches to face each other for the inaugural championship on the premiere episode of Dynamite on October 2, 2019.

The event garnered positive reviews from critics, with the most praise being lavished on the ladder match.

== Production ==
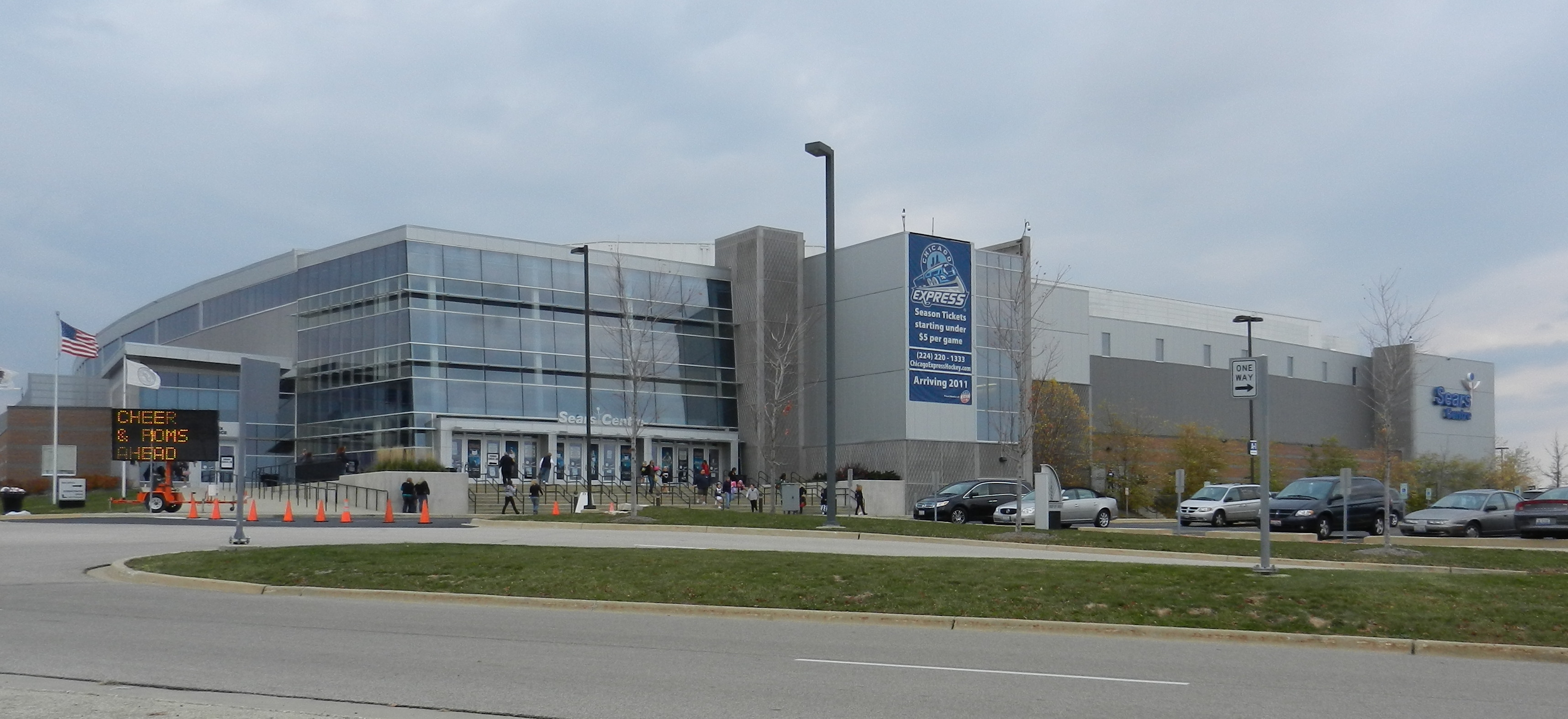
The inaugural All Out was held at the Sears Centre Arena (renamed Now Arena in 2020) in the Chicago suburb of Hoffman Estates, Illinois, the same venue that hosted All In the year prior.

=== Background ===
During the American professional wrestling promotion All Elite Wrestling's (AEW) inaugural pay-per-view (PPV) event, Double or Nothing, in May 2019, it was announced that All Out was scheduled as a spiritual sequel to the independently produced All In PPV and would be held during Labor Day weekend on Saturday, August 31, 2019, the day before the first anniversary of All In. It was also revealed that All Out would be held at the same venue as All In, the Sears Centre Arena in the Chicago suburb of Hoffman Estates, Illinois. The event was named "All Out" as the "All In" name was owned by Ring of Honor (ROH) at the time and AEW president Tony Khan wanted to avoid a lawsuit—Khan would later purchase ROH in March 2022.

All Out was accompanied by Starrcast III occurring on the same weekend. Tickets for the event sold out within 15 minutes. On August 12, it was announced that the event would be available for purchase in the United Kingdom on ITV Box Office and the one-hour "Buy In" pre-show would air live on ITV4. On August 27, Cracker Barrel Old Country Store was announced as the title sponsor for one of the event's matches.

As revealed in a web video posted by AEW Chief Brand Officer Brandi Rhodes on June 19, 2019, the AEW Women's World Championship belt would be unveiled at All Out. Rhodes did not reveal any details of when or how the first champion would be determined. On August 30, the day before All Out, TNT aired a one-hour television special called Countdown to All Out. There were 390,000 views for the show, which promoted viewing All Out via B/R Live.

=== Storylines ===
All Out comprised 10 professional wrestling matches, including two on the pre-show, which involved different wrestlers from pre-existing scripted feuds and storylines. Storylines were produced on The Young Bucks' YouTube series Being The Elite and AEW's YouTube series The Road to All Out.

In the lead up to Double or Nothing on AEW's YouTube channel, it was revealed that the winner of the Casino Battle Royale, held during the event's Buy In pre-show, would face the winner of Double or Nothing's main event at a future date to determine the inaugural AEW World Champion. The battle royal was won by Adam Page, while Chris Jericho defeated Kenny Omega in the main event, setting up the inaugural championship match, which was scheduled for All Out. Following Page's match at Fight for the Fallen, Jericho attacked Page. Later that night, Page returned and attacked Jericho during the latter's in-ring promo.

At the conclusion of Double or Nothing, Jon Moxley appeared from the crowd, confirming he had signed with AEW, and attacked both Chris Jericho and Kenny Omega. The latter fought back and brawled on the entrance stage where Moxley put Omega through the stage with a standing fireman's carry takeover. Later, a match between Omega and Moxley was scheduled for All Out. At Fyter Fest, Omega attacked Moxley following the latter's match, with Omega standing tall. On August 23, however, Moxley announced that he would be unable to compete at All Out due to an elbow injury. It was then confirmed that Pac would replace Moxley after AEW and Dragon Gate settled their creative differences, which kept Pac from competing at Double or Nothing and subsequent events, making All Out Pac's debut match for AEW.

During the Fyter Fest pre-show, Best Friends (Chuck Taylor and Trent Beretta) defeated SoCal Uncensored (represented by Frankie Kazarian and Scorpio Sky) and Private Party (Isiah Kassidy and Marq Quen) in a three-way tag team match, while at Fight for the Fallen, The Dark Order (Evil Uno and Stu Grayson) made their AEW in-ring debut and defeated Angélico and Jack Evans and Jungle Boy and Luchasaurus, also in a three-way tag team match. With their respective wins, Best Friends and The Dark Order advanced to All Out for an opportunity at a first-round bye in the AEW World Tag Team Championship tournament.

On March 16 at AAA's Rey de Reyes, The Young Bucks (Matt Jackson and Nick Jackson) defeated the Lucha Brothers (Pentagón Jr. and Rey Fénix) to win the AAA World Tag Team Championship and retained them in a rematch at Double or Nothing. In June, the Lucha Brothers regained the titles at AAA's Verano de Escándalo. Following the Lucha Brothers' match at Fight for the Fallen, they challenged The Young Bucks to a ladder match at All Out with their titles on the line and the Bucks accepted. The match would later be dubbed "Escalera De La Muerte" (Spanish for "Ladder of Death").

After Cody and Darby Allin's match came to a time limit draw at Fyter Fest, Shawn Spears appeared and delivered a chair shot to Cody's head, resulting in Cody receiving 12 surgical staples. In a sit-down interview with Jim Ross, Spears explained that he thought Cody was his friend until Cody had called him a "good hand", feeling that Cody had disrespected him, and that was why he attacked him. He said that Cody was a leech, dating back to when they both started in Ohio Valley Wrestling in 2006. He then made a challenge for All Out, which was made official.

At Fight for the Fallen, the team of Jimmy Havoc, Darby Allin, and Joey Janela lost to the team of Shawn Spears, MJF, and Sammy Guevara. The three blamed each other for their loss and brawled backstage. A three-way match was later scheduled for All Out.

On The Road to All Out on August 7, it was announced that the All Out pre-show would feature a female version of the Casino Battle Royale with the winner receiving a match for the inaugural AEW Women's World Championship, scheduled for the October 2 debut broadcast of AEW's television show, later revealed to be Dynamite. Nyla Rose, Britt Baker, Allie, Brandi Rhodes, Teal Piper, Ivelisse, and Jazz were confirmed for the 21-woman battle royal. On August 20, it was announced that Big Swole and Sadie Gibbs would also be entrants. On August 26, Awesome Kong confirmed she would compete in the battle royale in an interview with the New York Post. On August 29, Shazza McKenzie was announced as an entrant. On August 30, Allie was announced as an entrant.

== Event ==
Other on-screen personnel
Role	Name
Commentators	Jim Ross (PPV)
Commentators	Excalibur (Pre-show + PPV)
Commentators	Goldenboy (Pre-show + PPV)
Spanish commentators	Alex Abrahantes
Spanish commentators	Dasha Kuret
Spanish commentators	Hugo Savinovich
Ring announcer	Justin Roberts
Referees	Aubrey Edwards
Referees	Bryce Remsburg
Referees	Earl Hebner
Referees	Paul Turner
Referees	Rick Knox
Interviewer	Jenn Decker

=== The Buy In ===
Two matches occurred during the Buy In pre-show. The first was the women's Casino Battle Royale, in which the winner received a match against either Riho or Hikaru Shida for the inaugural AEW Women's World Championship, scheduled for Dynamite on October 2. Nyla Rose won by last eliminating Britt Baker.

In the second, Private Party (Isiah Kassidy and Marq Quen) faced Angélico and Jack Evans. Private Party performed Gin and Juice on Evans to win the match. After the match, Angélico and Evans attacked Private Party.

=== Preliminary matches ===
The actual pay-per-view opened with SoCal Uncensored (Christopher Daniels, Frankie Kazarian, and Scorpio Sky) facing Jurassic Express (Jungle Boy, Luchasaurus, and Marko Stunt). In the climax, Daniels and Kazarian performed the Best Meltzer Ever on Jungle Boy and Stunt to win the match.

Next, Kenny Omega faced Pac. In the end, Pac forced Omega to pass out to the Brutalizer to win the match.

After that, Joey Janela, Darby Allin, and Jimmy Havoc competed in a three-way hardcore match sponsored by Cracker Barrel Old Country Store, dubbed the Cracker Barrel Clash. Early in the match, Janela and Allin duct-taped Havoc to a chair, put thumbtacks in his mouth and taped it shut. Later, Allin attempted a suicide fall with the sponsor's barrel positioned on top of Havoc, who was lying on steel steps, but Havoc moved, causing Allin to crush through the barrel on top of the steel steps. In the end, Havoc performed an Acid Rainmaker through a barrel on Janela to win the match.

Later, The Dark Order (Evil Uno and Stu Grayson) faced Best Friends (Chuck Taylor and Trent Beretta) for a first round bye in the AEW World Tag Team Championship tournament. Uno and Grayson performed a Fatality on Beretta to win the match. After the match, The Dark Order attacked Best Friends. The lights then went out and Orange Cassidy appeared in the ring to help the Best Friends.

In the fifth match, Riho faced Hikaru Shida, in which the winner would face Nyla Rose for the inaugural AEW Women's World Championship on October 2 on Dynamite. The climax saw Riho pin Shida with a roll up to win the match. After the match, Nyla Rose came down to the ring and had a staredown with Riho.

Next, Cody (accompanied by his wife Brandi Rhodes, Diamond Dallas Page, the Rhodes' dog Pharaoh, and MJF, who stayed at ringside) faced Shawn Spears (accompanied by Tully Blanchard). During the match, Blanchard attempted to interfere several times. Eventually, Arn Anderson came out, and with the referee distracted, Anderson performed a spine buster on Spears. In the end, Cody performed Cross Rhodes on Spears to win the match.

In the penultimate match, the Lucha Brothers (Pentagón Jr. and Rey Fénix) defended the AAA World Tag Team Championship against The Young Bucks (Matt Jackson and Nick Jackson) in an Escalera De La Muerte (ladder match). In the end, Pentagon and Fenix performed a Fear Factor/Springboard Double Foot Stomp combination on a bridged ladder on Matt and then retrieved the belts to retain the title. After the match, Santana and Ortiz appeared (formerly part of The Latin American Xchange in Impact Wrestling), making their AEW debut, and attacked the Lucha Brothers and Nick Jackson.

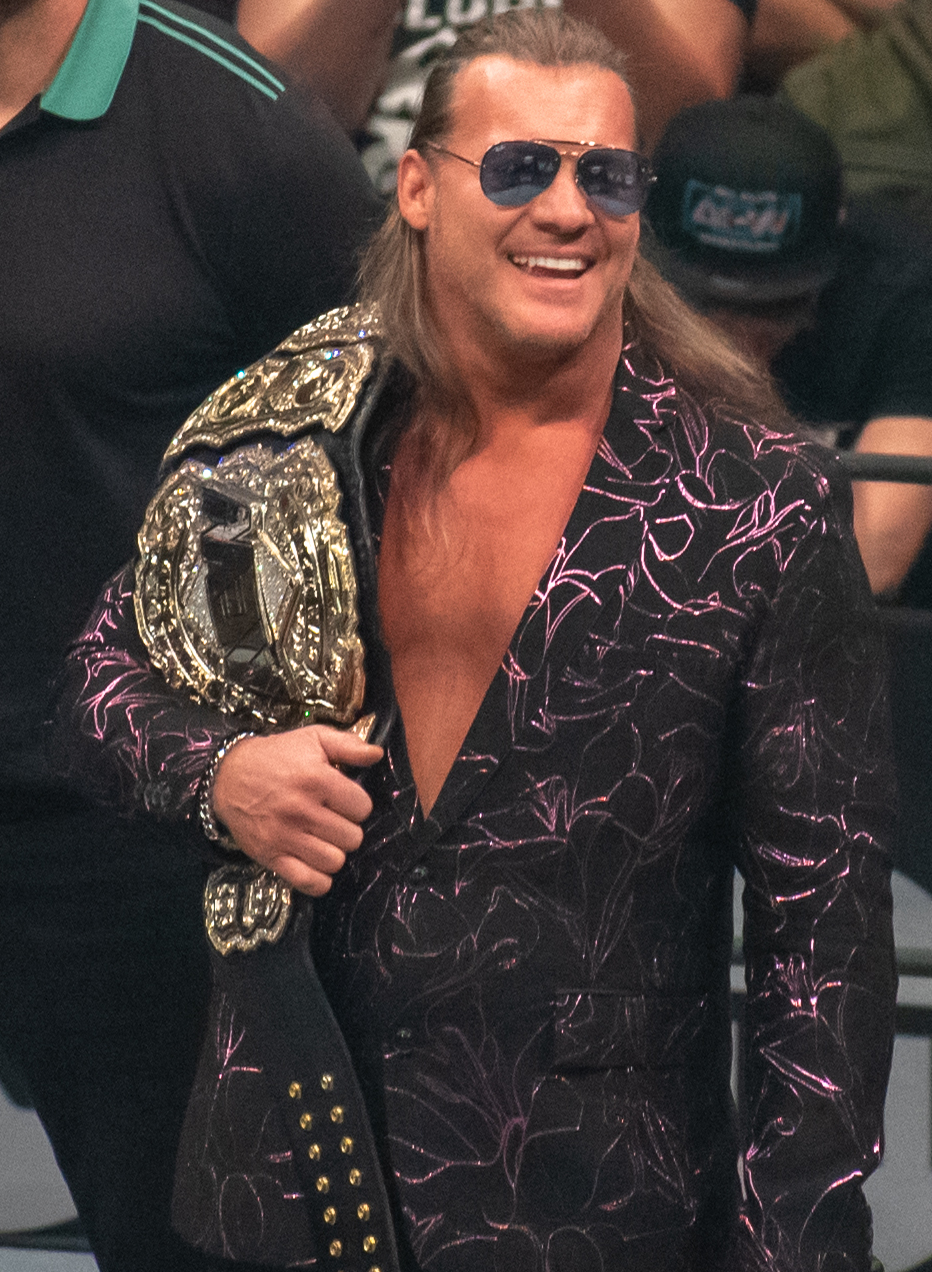
In the main event, Chris Jericho defeated Adam Page to become the inaugural AEW World Champion.

=== Main event ===
In the main event, Chris Jericho faced Adam Page for the inaugural AEW World Championship. Page attempted a shooting star press on Jericho off the ring apron, who countered into a Codebreaker. Page attempted a Buckshot Lariat, but Jericho countered into a Codebreaker for a near-fall. Page performed a Dead Eye on Jericho for a near-fall. Page performed a second Buckshot Lariat on Jericho, but Jericho performed the Judas Effect on Page to win the title and become the inaugural AEW World Champion.

== Reception ==
=== Tickets and buys ===
All Out, which had a sold out 10,500 attendance in the Sears Center, sold out faster than any other professional wrestling event held in North America. According to journalist Dave Meltzer, the initial number of American television pay-per-view buys for All Out is roughly 28,000. Compared to Double or Nothing, All Out had fewer television pay-per-view buys, more B/R Live pay-per view buys, and more ITV pay-per-view buys in the United Kingdom. Meltzer estimated that in total, around 100,000 paid to watch the show, which "does show staying power", and is a better number than any American wrestling company historically other than WWE/WWF and WCW, stating that several other companies did worse despite having prominent television shows promoting their product, unlike AEW.

=== Critical reception ===
All Out received near-critical acclaim. Dave Meltzer of the Wrestling Observer Newsletter reviewed All Out as "great": the "atmosphere was tremendous", and there was "the feeling of history" about this show, which outstripped All In and Double or Nothing. According to Meltzer, AEW was "loaded with talent" (including underrated ones such as Jack Evans and Scorpio Sky) and the "action and layout in every match was strong". Meltzer felt that the show may have had the best ladder match ever, rating The Young Bucks versus Lucha Brothers match 5.25 stars, exceeding the typically 5 star scale. That match featured "a series of car crashes". The other standout match on the show for Meltzer was Omega-Pac at 4.25 stars. However, Meltzer felt that the match order could have been improved, as the quality of the ladder match and Omega-Pac meant that the matches following them (including the "great" Jericho-Page main event) were "hurt": "usual ring psychology and reverses into Boston crabs are going to have a difficult time". Additionally, Meltzer noted that Luchasaurus was particularly popular among the live audience for his acrobatics, which were discouraged by his previous company WWE.

Anthony Sulla-Heffinger of Yahoo Sports wrote that he had "five takeaways from the event". First, "AEW women's division starts to come into focus" by setting up the inaugural AEW women's championship match between match winners Nyla Rose and Riho. The Casino Battle Royale successfully featured every woman in the match, while Sulla-Heffinger felt that Riho's performances render her as "arguably the best" wrestler AEW has. Second, Pac "shines" despite being a substitute for Jon Moxley, with his match with Kenny Omega having "excellent ring psychology" and exceeding expectations "from a narrative standpoint" with Pac wanting Omega's respect. Third, the match between Cody and Shawn Spears featured "a story rich in professional wrestling lore". Fourth, the ladder match of "pure carnage" may be the best match of the year. Fifth, Jericho had the "résumé and reputation" to be AEW's first champion.

Justin Barasso of Sports Illustrated wrote that with All Out, "AEW accomplished its mission to provide an engaging alternative" to WWE. Barasso felt that Jericho being chosen as the AEW champion garners "interest and anticipation for the TNT debut on October 2 in ways that Page simply cannot". Barasso criticized Omega's loss to Pac as a "peculiar way to introduce one of the biggest stars in wrestling", given Omega's earlier AEW loss to Jericho, and Barasso predicting that Omega would later lose to Moxley in AEW. Cody garnered "redemption" in Barasso's eyes, however Barasso did not yet understand why Anderson attacked Spears or why Blanchard walked out on Spears. The women's division was starting to show "clarity", with Barasso feeling "Riho would be a good building block for the division as the inaugural champ". The ladder match's "athleticism, adjustments and offense" were highlighted as "spectacular".

Nick Tylwalk of Slam! Sports rated the event 7.75 out of 10. Tylwalk wrote that the event proved that AEW has "enough talent on the roster to pull off a number of highly entertaining matches on any big card", with "several big time performances" at All Out boosted by a "stellar, consistently engaged crowd". However, "AEW has yet to find its hook" to distinguish itself from WWE. The storytelling was also a bit lacking. Dark Order versus Best Friends was the worst match on the main card for Tylwalk, who rated it 5 out of 10. SoCal Uncensored versus Jurassic Express was rated 7.5, as well the triple threat match as the second lowest rated matches. The ladder match was the best rated at 9.5.

== Aftermath ==
Two days after the event, it was reported by the Tallahassee Police Department that the AEW World Championship belt was legitimately stolen from Chris Jericho's limousine while he was eating dinner at a LongHorn Steakhouse. The following day, Jericho launched a "worldwide investigation" on his Instagram account and all of AEW's social media accounts. On Wednesday, however, Tallahassee Police confirmed they had recovered the championship belt, posting a picture on Facebook of one of their officers holding the title. Jericho was then scheduled to defend the title against Cody at Full Gear due to Cody's singles match win/loss/draw record.

On September 4, Kenny Omega and Jon Moxley's originally scheduled match for All Out was rescheduled for Full Gear.

During Adam Page's post-event interview, he was interrupted by Pac, who said that he had returned to AEW to get revenge on Page. A match between the two was then scheduled for the debut episode of AEW's new weekly show Dynamite on October 2; a match that was originally scheduled for Double or Nothing.

In November 2020, AEW President and CEO Tony Khan referred to All Out as being one of AEW's "Big Four" PPVs, which includes Double or Nothing, Full Gear, and Revolution, their four biggest domestic shows produced quarterly. The inaugural All Out was the second of these shows produced.

== Results ==
No.	Results	Stipulations	Times
1^{P}	Nyla Rose won by last eliminating Britt Baker	21-woman Casino Battle Royale; Winner went on to face the winner of Riho vs. Hikaru Shida for the inaugural AEW Women's World Championship on the premiere episode of Dynamite	20:35
2^{P}	Private Party (Isiah Kassidy and Marq Quen) defeated Angélico and Jack Evans	Tag team match	11:35
3	SoCal Uncensored (Christopher Daniels, Frankie Kazarian, and Scorpio Sky) defeated Jurassic Express (Jungle Boy, Luchasaurus, and Marko Stunt)	Six-man tag team match	11:45
4	Pac defeated Kenny Omega by technical submission	Singles match	23:20
5	Jimmy Havoc defeated Darby Allin and Joey Janela	Three-way Cracker Barrel Clash match	15:00
6	The Dark Order (Evil Uno and Stu Grayson) defeated Best Friends (Chuck Taylor and Trent Beretta)	Tag team match for a first round bye in the AEW World Tag Team Championship tournament	13:40
7	Riho defeated Hikaru Shida	Singles match Winner went on to face Nyla Rose (Casino Battle Royale winner) for the inaugural AEW Women's World Championship on the premiere episode of Dynamite	13:35
8	Cody (with MJF) defeated Shawn Spears (with Tully Blanchard)	Singles match	16:20
9	Lucha Brothers (Pentagón Jr. and Rey Fénix) (c) defeated The Young Bucks (Matt Jackson and Nick Jackson)	Escalera De La Muerte for the AAA World Tag Team Championship	24:10
10	Chris Jericho defeated Adam Page	Singles match for the inaugural AEW World Championship	26:25
(c) / – the champion(s) heading into the match; P / – the match was broadcast on the pre-show

=== Casino Battle Royale entrances and eliminations ===
Five wrestlers started the match. Every three minutes, five more wrestlers entered. The 21st and final entrant entered alone.

Draw	Entrant	Elimination Order	Eliminated by	Eliminations
Clubs	Shalandra Royal	1	Nyla Rose	0
Clubs	Leva Bates	4	Nyla Rose	0
Clubs	Faby Apache	2	Nyla Rose	0
Clubs	Priscilla Kelly	3	Nyla Rose	0
Clubs	Nyla Rose	-	Winner	10
Diamonds	Penelope Ford	7	Nyla Rose	0
Diamonds	Shazza McKenzie	5	Britt Baker	0
Diamonds	Sadie Gibbs	17	Bea Priestley	1
Diamonds	Big Swole	6	Nyla Rose	0
Diamonds	Britt Baker	20	Bea Priestley and Nyla Rose	5
Spades	Tenille Dashwood	8	Awesome Kong	0
Spades	Ivelisse	9	Awesome Kong	0
Spades	Bea Priestley	19	Britt Baker	3
Spades	Brandi Rhodes	15	Britt Baker and Allie	0
Spades	Awesome Kong	12	Bea Priestley, Sadie Gibbs, and ODB	2
Hearts	Allie	16	Nyla Rose	1
Hearts	Nicole Savoy	10	Nyla Rose	0
Hearts	Teal Piper	11	ODB	0
Hearts	ODB	14	Britt Baker	2
Hearts	Jazz	13	Nyla Rose	0
Joker	Mercedes Martinez	18	Britt Baker	0

^1Priestley was already eliminated when she pulled Baker over the top rope, eliminating her.

== See also ==
- 2019 in professional wrestling
- List of All Elite Wrestling pay-per-view events
