= All In London at Wembley Stadium =

All In London at Wembley Stadium is a promotional name that has been used by All Elite Wrestling (AEW) for their biggest professional wrestling event, All In, when held at Wembley Stadium in London, England.

It may refer to:

- All In (2023), a 2023 event.
- All In (2024), a 2024 event.
