= All In (2018) =

Independent professional wrestling event

- Promotional poster featuring Cody Rhodes and The Young Bucks (Matt Jackson and Nick Jackson)
- Date: September 1, 2018
- City: Hoffman Estates, Illinois
- Venue: Sears Centre Arena
- Attendance: 11,263
- Buy rate: 50,000
- Tagline: The Biggest Independent Wrestling Show Ever

All In chronology
← Previous; First	Next → 2023

The 2018 All In was an independent professional wrestling pay-per-view (PPV) event promoted by Cody Rhodes and The Young Bucks (Matt Jackson and Nick Jackson) in association with the American promotion Ring of Honor (ROH). At the time, Rhodes and the Jacksons had been a part of the Bullet Club of New Japan Pro-Wrestling (NJPW) and ROH. The event took place during Labor Day weekend on Saturday, September 1, 2018, at the Sears Centre Arena in the Chicago suburb of Hoffman Estates, Illinois. The event aired live on traditional PPV outlets, FITE TV, and Honor Club, but it was later made available for on-demand viewing on the NJPW World streaming service. The event included Zero Hour, an hour-long pre-show that aired on WGN America. While independently produced, the event featured wrestlers from ROH, NJPW, Impact Wrestling, Lucha Libre AAA Worldwide (AAA), Major League Wrestling (MLW), and the National Wrestling Alliance (NWA).

The event had 11 matches, with two being on the pre-show. The show's main event was a six-man tag team match which saw The Golden Elite (Kota Ibushi, Matt Jackson, and Nick Jackson) defeat Rey Fénix, Bandido, and Rey Mysterio. In the penultimate match, Kazuchika Okada defeated Marty Scurll. On the undercard, Cody defeated Nick Aldis to win the NWA Worlds Heavyweight Championship, Jay Lethal successfully defended the ROH World Championship against Flip Gordon, and IWGP Heavyweight Champion Kenny Omega defeated Penta El Zero in a non-title match.

The event was notable for being the first non-WWE or World Championship Wrestling (WCW) promoted professional wrestling event in the United States to sell 10,000 tickets since 1993. The success of the event inspired the formation of All Elite Wrestling (AEW) in January 2019, with The Elite (Rhodes, The Young Bucks, and Omega) becoming executive vice presidents of the company. AEW would subsequently establish a spiritual successor to All In entitled All Out, which was also held during Labor Day weekend (until 2024) and considered one of AEW's "big four" annual PPV events. After AEW president Tony Khan acquired ROH in 2022, obtaining the rights to All In, AEW revived the event in 2023, with All In becoming an annual summer PPV for AEW and their marquee event, similar in comparison to WWE's WrestleMania, joining AEW's "big four" as the "big five".

== Production ==
=== Background ===
In May 2017, a fan asked Wrestling Observer Newsletter journalist Dave Meltzer on Twitter if Ring of Honor (ROH) could sell 10,000 tickets and Meltzer responded: "Not any time soon." Cody Rhodes took Meltzer's remark as a challenge and responded: "I'll take that bet Dave." Eventually, the idea evolved from an ROH show to a self-funded event (with ROH's official sanctioning), promoted by Cody Rhodes and The Young Bucks (Matt Jackson and Nick Jackson). It was later announced that Kenny Omega, Brandi Rhodes, and actor Stephen Amell would be participating in the event.

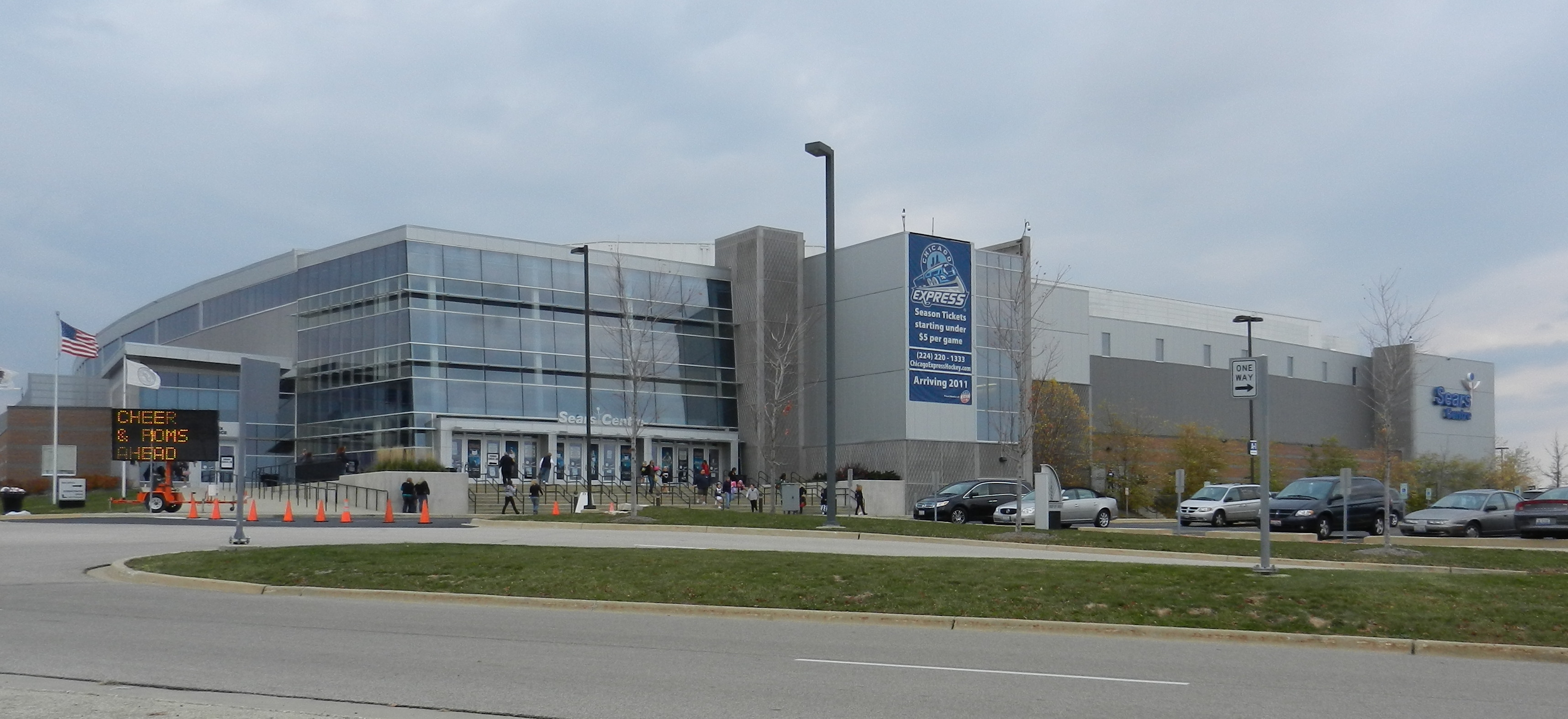
The inaugural All In was held at the Sears Centre Arena (renamed Now Arena in 2020) in the Chicago suburb of Hoffman Estates, Illinois.

On December 31, 2017, Cody and The Young Bucks announced on the Bucks' YouTube channel, Being The Elite, that they were looking at different venues to hold the event. It was later reported by Pro Wrestling Insider that the event was set to be held in Chicago. On January 10, 2018, it was announced that the event would take place on September 1, titled All In. On March 5, All In's venue was revealed as the Sears Centre Arena located in the Chicago suburb of Hoffman Estates, Illinois. Over the coming weeks, independent wrestlers would be announced to take part in the show, including Penta El Zero, Rey Fénix, Kazuchika Okada, Deonna Purrazzo (though she would later be removed after signing with WWE), Tessa Blanchard, Jay Lethal, Chelsea Green, Marty Scurll, and Hangman Page. Additionally, it was announced that to coincide with the event, Conrad Thompson would hold Starrcast, a fan convention which would feature numerous wrestlers and wrestling and podcast personalities including Jeff Jarrett, Eric Bischoff, Bruce Prichard, Diamond Dallas Page, and Macaulay Culkin. During the All In press conference on May 13, it was announced that Rey Mysterio and NWA Worlds Heavyweight Champion Nick Aldis would be taking part in the event.

Tickets for the show were put on sale on May 13 and sold out in less than 30 minutes despite Cody and The Young Bucks announcing only one match for the show. In the months leading up to the event, more wrestlers were announced to be "all in", including Maxwell Jacob Friedman, Madison Rayne, Kota Ibushi, SoCal Uncensored (Christopher Daniels, Frankie Kazarian, and Scorpio Sky), Best Friends (Chuck Taylor and Trent Barreta), and The Briscoe Brothers (Jay Briscoe and Mark Briscoe). During this time, Cody and The Young Bucks started a YouTube series called All Us, chronicling the lead-up to the event. On July 13, it was announced that Alicia Atout, Bobby Cruise, Don Callis, Excalibur, Ian Riccaboni, Justin Roberts, and Sean Mooney would serve as All In's broadcast team, with Brent Tarring being announced as a commentator on August 27. Bandido was announced for the show on July 25. On August 6, it was announced on Being The Elite that All In's main card would broadcast on pay-per-view and Fite TV, with an hour-long pre-show called Zero Hour airing on WGN America at 6:00 p.m. Eastern time. Later that day, it was announced that the event's main card would also broadcast on ROH's streaming service Honor Club. Additionally on August 6, Jordynne Grace, Moose, Rocky Romero, Colt Cabana, and Ethan Page were announced for the show. From August 15 until August 18, Brian Cage, Billy Gunn, Jimmy Jacobs, and Marko Stunt were announced for the show. On August 23, Brandon Cutler was announced for the show. Punishment Martinez was announced for the show on August 27. On August 29, it was announced that All In would be available for on demand viewing on NJPW World, after being broadcast live. On August 31, Austin Gunn, son of Billy Gunn, was announced for the show. On September 1, Tim Storm was announced for the show. Wrestler Adam Birch was scheduled to be a producer on the show, but in the early morning hours of September 1 he was arrested in Schaumburg, Illinois after police noticed him sleeping in his car and discovered he had an outstanding warrant in Florida.

=== Storylines ===
All In comprised 11 professional wrestling matches, including two on the Zero Hour pre-show, that involved different wrestlers from pre-existing scripted feuds and storylines. Storylines were produced on The Young Bucks' YouTube series Being The Elite, the NWA's Ten Pounds of Gold documentary series, Cody's Nightmare Family YouTube series ALL US – The All In Story, and at various shows produced by the promotions involved.

On April 10, Joey Ryan was (kayfabe) killed on Being The Elite by a mystery assailant in a Japanese hotel room. On June 4 on Being The Elite, Japanese police arrested Arrow star Stephen Amell for Ryan's murder. On July 16, it was revealed that Christopher Daniels had framed Amell for the murder. On August 6 on Being The Elite, it was announced that Amell, who had recently been released from prison, would face Daniels at All In. On August 27 on Being The Elite, Daniels and Amell would have their final confrontation before the event, with Amell warning Daniels that he would put him through a table just like he did during his debut in Ring of Honor.

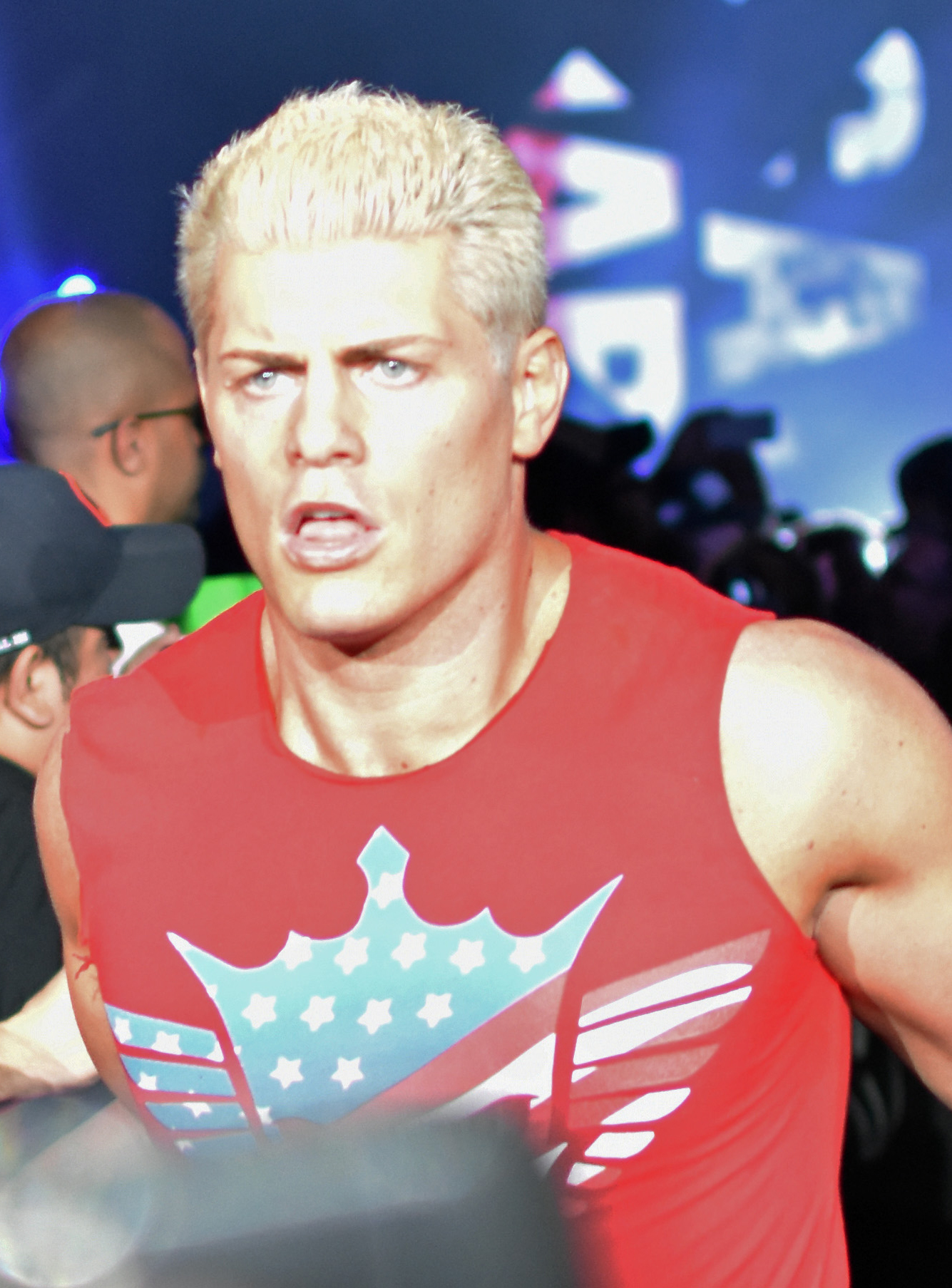
Cody, who challenged Nick Aldis for the NWA Worlds Heavyweight Championship at All In

During the May 13 All In press conference, National Wrestling Alliance (NWA) president Billy Corgan announced that Nick Aldis would defend the NWA Worlds Heavyweight Championship against Cody. If Cody were to win, he and his father Dusty Rhodes would become the first father-son duo to win the NWA Worlds Heavyweight Championship. During ROH's Honor United tour in London on May 27, it was announced that if Cody was able to reclaim the ROH World Championship before All In, then the match would become a Winner Takes All match for both the NWA and ROH world championships. Cody received his ROH World Championship match on June 29 at Best in the World, but he failed to capture the title despite Aldis trying to help him to win the match. Cody would receive a second title opportunity during the June 30 tapings of Ring of Honor Wrestling, but lost again. The match, now solely for the NWA title, was officially sanctioned by NWA management on July 31. On September 1, it was announced that former NWA Worlds Heavyweight Champion Tim Storm would be in Aldis' corner.

On June 8 at a WrestlePro event, Madison Rayne and Maxwell Jacob Friedman defeated Brandi Rhodes and Flip Gordon to qualify for All In. On the August 7 episode of All Us, a four corners match between Rayne, Dr. Britt Baker, Chelsea Green and Tessa Blanchard was announced.

On July 5, it was announced that Marty Scurll would be taking on Kazuchika Okada at the event. Scurll began training with Nick Aldis to become a heavyweight on Being The Elite in preparation for the match against Okada. Over the subsequent episodes of Being The Elite, multiple wrestlers would dismiss Scurll's chances of defeating Okada, including The Young Bucks, Jack Swagger, Rey Mysterio, Zack Sabre Jr., and Okada himself. On August 27 on Being The Elite, Scurll responded to all doubts, stating he would defeat Okada at the event.

On July 16 on Being The Elite, Joey Janela greeted Matt Jackson and Marty Scurll, immediately drawing the ire of Jackson. On July 23, it was announced that Joey Janela would face Hangman Page at All In. Later that day on Twitter, Page would send a warning to Janela and proclaim himself a Joey Killer. On August 12, on Being The Elite, Page had a nightmare with his cowboy boots telling him that he would kill another Joey, referring to Joey Janela. On August 27 on Being The Elite, Janela would provoke Page during an autograph session. On August 29, it was announced that the match would be a Chicago street fight.

On July 30, it was announced that Bandido, Rey Fénix, and Rey Mysterio would take on The Golden Elite (Kota Ibushi, Matt Jackson, and Nick Jackson) in a six-man tag-team match. During Being The Elite on August 27, Mysterio and actor Theo Rossi mocked The Young Bucks.

On August 6, it was announced that the Over Budget Battle Royale and a tag team match between The Briscoe Brothers (Jay Briscoe and Mark Briscoe) and SoCal Uncensored (Frankie Kazarian and Scorpio Sky) would occur on the Zero Hour pre-show. Shortly after, SoCal Uncensored started training for their match against The Briscoe Brothers at All In. On August 7, it was announced that Jay Lethal would defend the ROH World Championship against the winner of the battle royale.

On August 12, it was announced that IWGP Heavyweight Champion Kenny Omega would face Penta El Zero at All In in a non-title match.

== Event ==
Other on-screen personnel
Role:	Name:
Commentators	Ian Riccaboni
Commentators	Excalibur
Commentators	Don Callis
Commentators	Dalton Castle (Over Budget Battle Royal)
Commentators	Tenille Dashwood (women's match)
Commentators	Mandy Leon (women's match)
Commentators	Brent "Timmy Baltimore" Tarring (NWA championship match)
Ring announcers	Justin Roberts
Ring announcers	Bobby Cruise
Referees	Earl Hebner
Referees	Jerry Lynn
Referees	Paul Turner
Referees	Rick Knox
Referees	Tiger Hattori
Referees	Todd Sinclair
Interviewers	Alicia Atout
Interviewers	Sean Mooney

=== Pre-show ===
Two matches were contested on the one-hour-long pre-show, called Zero Hour, which was shown live on WGN America. Cody and The Young Bucks appeared on stage to start the event, offering to the live audience free merchandise, which was distributed by staff from Hot Topic and Pro Wrestling Tees. Road Warrior Animal made a cameo appearance.

The first Zero Hour match was a non-title tag team match between SoCal Uncensored (Frankie Kazarian and Scorpio Sky) and ROH World Tag Team Champions The Briscoes (Jay Briscoe and Mark Briscoe). Near the end of the match, the Briscoes performed on Kazarian a Jay-Driller and a Froggy Bow, but Sky stopped the Briscoes' subsequent pin attempt. Jay hoisted Kazarian on his shoulders for a doomsday device attempt with Mark diving towards Kazarian, but Kazarian countered by catching and powerslamming Mark. Kazarian successfully pinned Mark to win the match as Sky kneed Jay to prevent interference. After this match, Kenny Omega was interviewed backstage by Alicia Atout.

Next, the Over Budget Battle Royale took place with 19 participants vying to face Jay Lethal for the ROH World Championship on the main card of All In. At the start of the match, outside the ring, Bully Ray powerbombed the masked El Hijo De Chico through a table, incapacitating El Hijo De Chico for most of the match. Over the course of the match, Bully Ray eliminated Tommy Dreamer, Austin Gunn, Marko Stunt, Jordynne Grace and finally Colt Cabana to appear to win the match. However, El Hijo De Chico returned and superkicked Ray, then unmasked himself revealing Flip Gordon. Gordon eliminated Ray to win the match and the ROH World Championship opportunity.

=== Preliminary matches ===
The first match on the main card was unadvertised and saw MJF facing Matt Cross. MJF repeatedly targeted one of Cross' arms and then executed a rope-assisted piledriver on Cross for a two count. Cross came back with a cutter and a shooting star press on MJF and won the match. After this match, Nick Aldis was interviewed backstage by Sean Mooney.

Next, Christopher Daniels faced Stephen Amell in a match refereed by Jerry Lynn. Daniels executed the Best Moonsault Ever for a two count. Amell attempted a diving elbow drop but Daniels dodged, causing Amell to crash through a table on the floor. Lynn moved Daniels and Amell back into the ring to avoid the match ending via count-out, drawing Daniels' ire. Lynn pushed Daniels, so Amell took advantage with a schoolboy pin for a two count. Amell countered Daniels' Angels' Wings with a bridging pin for a two count. Daniels used a uranage and a second Best Moonsault Ever to prevail over Amell; both shook hands post-match.

After this, Dr. Britt Baker, Chelsea Green, Madison Rayne and Tessa Blanchard faced off in a four corner survival match. In the climax, Blanchard performed the hammerlock DDT on Green to win the match. After the match, the four embraced.

Next, Nick Aldis defended the NWA Worlds Heavyweight Championship against Cody. As Aldis went to the top rope to perform a diving elbow drop, Cody's wife Brandi Rhodes tried to plead with Aldis to not do it. However, Aldis did the move and as soon as he jumped Brandi lay across Cody, taking the bulk of the hit. Aldis then pinned Cody, but he kicked out. Cody performed a Beautiful Disaster and then the Cross Rhodes on Aldis for a near-fall. Cody and Aldis attacked each other with punches and then Cody hit a vertebreaker on Aldis, but Aldis reversed it. In the end, Aldis tried to steal Cody's finisher, but Cody reversed and Aldis tried to pin him. However, Cody countered into a sunset flip to win the NWA Worlds Heavyweight Championship. With this win, Cody and his father Dusty Rhodes became the first father-son duo to win the championship.

In the next match, Hangman Page faced Joey Janela in a Chicago street fight. In the end, Page performed the Rite of Passage on Janela from the top of a ladder through a table to win the match. After the match, the lights went out. Similar to The Undertaker, druids appeared, but instead of druids it was men in inflatable penis costumes. Joey Ryan, thought to be dead, appeared and Page tried to attack him, but Ryan attacked Page and performed a superkick and Page was carried out of the arena.

Next, Jay Lethal defended the ROH World Championship against the over budget battle royale winner Flip Gordon. Lethal came out in his Black Machismo gimmick. During the match, Gordon performed a Stardust Press on Lethal for a near-fall. Lethal tried to perform a diving powerbomb, but Gordon reversed and Lethal performed a Lethal Injection II on Gordon. In the end, Lethal executed the Lethal Injection on Gordon to win the match and retain the title. After the match, the two showed mutual respect for each other. Bully Ray then came out and attacked both Lethal and Gordon. Chicago's own Colt Cabana appeared to make the save and then the three performed a triple powerbomb on Ray through a table.

Next, Kenny Omega faced Penta El Zero in singles match. Omega tried to perform the One-Winged Angel, but Penta reversed into The Sacrifice. Penta executed the Fear Factor on Omega for a nearfall and later Penta tried to perform a lariat, but Omega performed the V-Trigger followed by a reverse frankensteiner. In the end, Omega performed another V-Trigger and then the One Winged Angel to win the match. After the match, the lights went out. When they came back on, Penta got up and attacked Omega with the Codebreaker. Upon closer examination, it was a second Penta El Zero, who unmasked to reveal himself as Chris Jericho, and challenged Omega to a match at his Rock 'N' Wrestling Rager at Sea cruise.

In the penultimate match, Kazuchika Okada faced Marty Scurll in a singles match. In the end, Scurll provoked Okada and tried to break his fingers, but Okada reverted into the Rainmaker followed by a second Rainmaker to win the match.

=== Main event ===
In the main event, The Golden Elite (Kota Ibushi, Matt Jackson and Nick Jackson) faced Bandido, Rey Fénix and Rey Mysterio in six-man tag team match. Bandido hit Matt Jackson with a backflipping backbreaker. Nick Jackson hit Bandido with a superkick. The Young Bucks also hit a superkick on both Fenix and Mysterio. Ibushi and The Young Bucks performed the More Bang for Your Buck. with Ibushi pinning Bandido for a nearfall. In the end, The Young Bucks performed the Meltzer Driver on Bandido to win the match.

== Reception ==
All In received near-universal acclaim, with Sports Illustrated calling a "near-perfect pay-per-view debut". John Moore of Pro Wrestling Dot Net recommended the event, but pointed that it "suffers [from] that ROH and New Japan problem of having too many matches".

Larry Csonka of 411Mania gave the event a final score of 8/10, saying "I found All In to be a tremendously fun show, with a lot of good to great wrestling and an absolutely great atmosphere". During the final matches, the production found time problems so the main event was shortened almost 12 minutes. The NWA Worlds Heavyweight Championship match went six minutes shorter than originally planned. Many wrestling personalities such as Tazz and Daniel Bryan praised the event and its production and the quality of matches. Dwayne "The Rock" Johnson praised Cody for his championship win on Twitter two days after the event. Wrestling Observer Newsletter journalist Dave Meltzer said the event was a "great success" and "he was happy for losing the bet" [...] the event exceeded his expectations especially the over the budget battle royal, which he called the "best laid out battle royal he had ever seen".

Jesse Collings from Wrestling Inc said "the most important thing for the group was to put on a memorable show that satisfied the hardcore fans [...] while also entertaining more casual fans who were seeing a lot of the wrestlers for the first time and were not watching Being The Elite every week". Griffin Peltier from Voices of Wrestling said "All In was not only a great PPV but a historic event in pro wrestling history. Everything on the show felt fresh and felt rewarded as a viewer". Writing for The Ringer, Mike Piellucci praised All In, calling it "one of the greatest wrestling shows in recent memory".

Dave Meltzer gave six matches on the card four stars or higher. Despite the main event being significantly cut short due to time constraints, Meltzer gave that match a 4 1/2-star rating.

== Aftermath and legacy ==
Four months after the event, Cody and The Young Bucks, with several others, left Ring of Honor. WWE purportedly also offered Cody, The Young Bucks, and Hangman Page contracts, but they rejected the reported offers. On January 1, 2019, Cody and The Young Bucks founded their own promotion, All Elite Wrestling (AEW), with backing of billionaire businessmen and owners of the Jacksonville Jaguars and Fulham F.C., Shahid and Tony Khan, the latter becoming the President and chief executive officer of AEW, with Cody and The Young Bucks being executive vice presidents. Their inaugural event was announced as Double or Nothing to be held in May. Kenny Omega also became an executive vice president for AEW. In 2019, a plaque commemorating All In was established outside the Sears Centre's entrance.

During Double or Nothing on May 25, 2019, AEW announced that the Sears Centre would host All Out, the company's second pay-per-view event, on August 31, 2019, the day before the first anniversary of All In. All Out was established as a spiritual successor to All In, and is held every September in the Chicago area. AEW owner Tony Khan had wanted to use the All In name at this time but did not want a lawsuit as Ring of Honor retained the rights to All In and its footage as a condition for Cody and The Young Bucks to promote the event. Those rights were acquired by Tony Khan following his purchase of ROH in March 2022. On April 5, 2023, AEW announced that they would revive the All In name for a pay-per-view to be held in London, England on August 27, 2023, titled "All In London at Wembley Stadium", which was the promotion's debut in the United Kingdom and one of the biggest professional wrestling events ever. All In would subsequently become an annual summer PPV and AEW's biggest event of the year, similar in comparison to WWE's WrestleMania, supplanting Double or Nothing as the company's marquee event, and becoming one of AEW's "big five" PPVs, along with Double or Nothing, All Out, Revolution, and Full Gear.

== Results ==
No.	Results	Stipulations	Times
1^{P}	SoCal Uncensored (Frankie Kazarian and Scorpio Sky) defeated Briscoe Brothers (Jay Briscoe and Mark Briscoe)	Tag team match	12:33
2^{P}	El Hijo De Chico (Flip Gordon) won by last eliminating Bully Ray (Note: Order of eliminations: Moose, Brandon Cutler, Chuckie T., Trent Barreta, Rocky Romero, Cheeseburger, The Hurricane, Ethan Page, Tommy Dreamer, Jimmy Jacobs, Punishment Martinez, Austin Gunn, Billy Gunn, Marko Stunt, Brian Cage, Jordynne Grace, Colt Cabana, and Bully Ray.)	19-person Over Budget Battle Royal to determine the #1 contender for the ROH World Championship on the main card	17:06
3	Matt Cross defeated Maxwell Jacob Friedman	Singles match	9:23
4	Christopher Daniels (with SoCal Uncensored (Frankie Kazarian and Scorpio Sky)) defeated Stephen Amell (with Josh Segarra)	Singles match	12:30
5	Tessa Blanchard defeated Dr. Britt Baker, Chelsea Green, and Madison Rayne	Four corner survival match	12:41
6	Cody (with Brandi Rhodes, Diamond Dallas Page, Glacier, and Tommy Dreamer) defeated Nick Aldis (c) (with Jeff Jarrett, Samuel Shaw, Shawn Daivari, and Tim Storm)	Singles match for the NWA Worlds Heavyweight Championship	22:01
7	Hangman Page defeated Joey Janela (with Penelope Ford)	Chicago Street Fight	20:08
8	Jay Lethal (c) (with Lanny Poffo) defeated Flip Gordon (with Brandi Rhodes)	Singles match for the ROH World Championship	14:21
9	Kenny Omega defeated Penta El Zero	Singles match	17:47
10	Kazuchika Okada defeated Marty Scurll	Singles match	26:05
11	The Golden Elite (Kota Ibushi, Matt Jackson and Nick Jackson) defeated Bandido, Rey Fénix, and Rey Mysterio	Six-man tag team match	11:48
(c) / – the champion(s) heading into the match; P / – the match was broadcast on the pre-show

== See also ==
- 2018 in professional wrestling
- Starrcast
