= AEW All Out =

All Elite Wrestling pay-per-view event series

- AEW All Out logo
- Promotion: All Elite Wrestling
- First event: 2019

AEW All Out is a professional wrestling pay-per-view (PPV) event produced by All Elite Wrestling (AEW). Established in 2019, it is held annually in September, having originally taken place during Labor Day weekend until 2024. The inaugural event is considered a spiritual successor to the independently produced All In in 2018, which served as a catalyst to the formation of AEW in January 2019. It is one of AEW's "Big Five" events, along with All In, Double or Nothing, Full Gear, and Revolution.

With the exception of the 2020 event, All Out was held annually in the Chicago metropolitan area until 2025. The 2019, 2021, 2022, and 2024 events were held at the Now Arena (formerly Sears Centre Arena) in the Chicago suburb of Hoffman Estates, Illinois, the same venue that hosted the inaugural All In, with the 2023 event held at Chicago's United Center. Due to the COVID-19 pandemic in 2020, that year's All Out, which was originally scheduled for the Now Arena, had to be held at Daily's Place in Jacksonville, Florida, and it was AEW's first PPV to have a live ticketed audience (with a maximum 15% capacity of venue) after Florida loosened its COVID-19 protocols. The following year in July, AEW returned to live touring and the 2021 event became AEW's first PPV held outside of Florida since the start of the pandemic. The 2024 event was the first to not be held during Labor Day weekend, and it also returned the event to Saturday for the first time since 2020. The 2025 event was the first non-pandemic era All Out to take place outside of the Chicago area, and subsequently the United States, as it was held in Toronto, Ontario, Canada.

== History ==
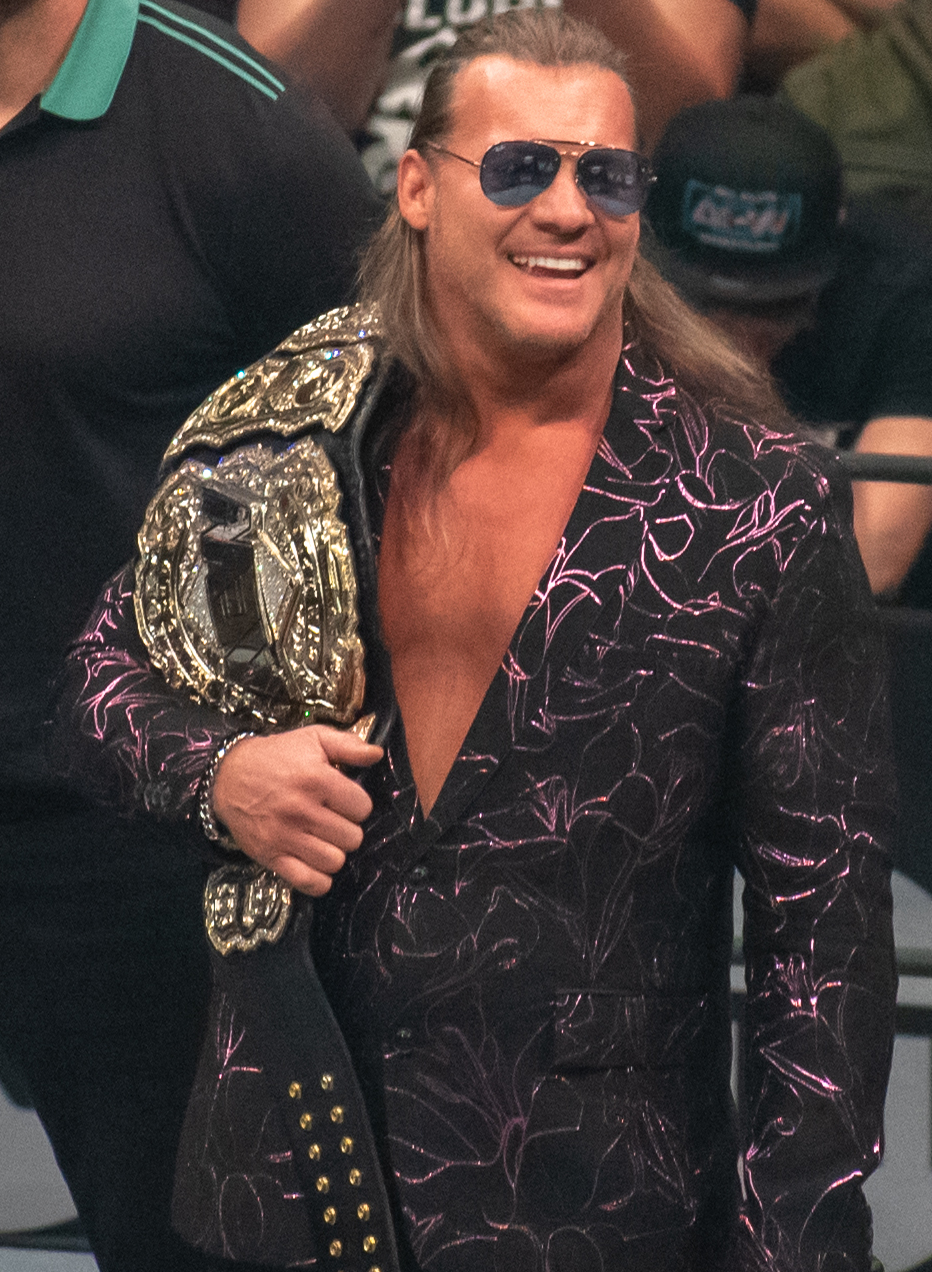
The inaugural All Out's main event saw Chris Jericho become the first AEW World Champion

On September 1, 2018, an independent wrestling pay-per-view (PPV) event was held called All In, which took place in the Chicago suburb of Hoffman Estates, Illinois at the former Sears Centre Arena—renamed to Now Arena in 2020. The event was organized by members of The Elite and it was a catalyst to the formation of All Elite Wrestling (AEW) on January 1, 2019. The Elite became executive vice presidents of AEW, which scheduled a spiritual successor to All In called All Out, with the inaugural All Out PPV taking place on August 31, 2019, at the same venue as All In. The event was named "All Out" as the "All In" name was owned by Ring of Honor (ROH) at the time and AEW president Tony Khan wanted to avoid a lawsuit—Khan would later purchase ROH in March 2022 and later revived All In as an annual AEW PPV.

A second All Out was then held on September 5, 2020, establishing the event as an annual Labor Day weekend PPV for the promotion—this second event was originally to be held at the same venue, but was instead held at AEW's home base of Daily's Place in Jacksonville, Florida, due to the COVID-19 pandemic that began in mid-March that year. In August 2020, AEW began admitting a very limited number of fans to events, thus the 2020 event was AEW's first PPV to have live ticketed fans during the pandemic, though only at 15% of the venue's capacity. AEW resumed live touring in July 2021 and the 2021 event was held on September 5, returning to the inaugural event's venue, thus marking AEW's first PPV to be held outside of Daily's Place since the COVID-19 pandemic began. While All Out had traditionally been held at the Now Arena, the 2023 event moved All Out to Chicago's United Center.

The 2024 event was scheduled for Sunday, September 1, 2024, returning the event to the Now Arena. However, on May 21, AEW announced that All Out would instead take place at the Now Arena a week later on Saturday, September 7, in turn marking the first All Out to not be held during Labor Day weekend. This change came in response to criticism of the 2023 event being held only one week after All In. This subsequently returned the event to Saturday for the first time since 2020.

Although Double or Nothing was considered AEW's marquee event, AEW referee Aubrey Edwards referred to All Out as AEW's premier event on an episode of the AEW Unrestricted podcast. AEW President and Chief Executive Officer Tony Khan later referred to All Out as being one of the promotion's "Big Four" PPVs, their four biggest shows of the year produced quarterly, along with Double or Nothing, Full Gear, and Revolution. With All In becoming one of AEW's annual events in 2023, it supplanted Double or Nothing as AEW's marquee event, and overall biggest event of the year, with the previous "big four" plus All In becoming the "big five".

On May 20, 2025, the Toronto Sun reported that the 2025 All Out would be held at the Scotiabank Arena in Toronto, Ontario, Canada on Saturday, September 20, 2025, thus breaking AEW's tradition of hosting the event in the Chicago metropolitan area, subsequently marking the first All Out held outside the United States. This was also AEW's first PPV event available to livestream on HBO Max, with subscribers getting a discount (US$39.99 instead of US$49.99 on other platforms).

== Events ==
| # | Event | Date | City | Venue | Main event | Ref. |
|---|---|---|---|---|---|---|
| 1 | All Out (2019) | August 31, 2019 | Hoffman Estates, Illinois | Sears Centre Arena | Chris Jericho vs. Adam Page for the inaugural AEW World Championship | |
| 2 | All Out (2020) | September 5, 2020 | Jacksonville, Florida | Daily's Place | Jon Moxley (c) vs. MJF for the AEW World Championship | |
| 3 | All Out (2021) | September 5, 2021 | Hoffman Estates, Illinois | Now Arena | Kenny Omega (c) vs. Christian Cage for the AEW World Championship | |
| 4 | All Out (2022) | September 4, 2022 | Hoffman Estates, Illinois | Now Arena | Jon Moxley (c) vs. CM Punk for the AEW World Championship | |
| 5 | All Out (2023) | September 3, 2023 | Chicago, Illinois | United Center | Orange Cassidy (c) vs. Jon Moxley for the AEW International Championship | |
| 6 | All Out (2024) | September 7, 2024 | Hoffman Estates, Illinois | Now Arena | Swerve Strickland vs. "Hangman" Adam Page in a Lights Out Steel Cage match | |
| 7 | All Out (2025) | September 20, 2025 | Toronto, Ontario, Canada | Scotiabank Arena | "Hangman" Adam Page (c) vs. Kyle Fletcher for the AEW World Championship | |
| 8 | All Out (2026) | September 26, 2026 | Hoffman Estates, Illinois | Now Arena | Will Ospreay (c) vs. Jon Moxley for the AEW World Championship | |
(c) – refers to the champion(s) heading into the match

== See also ==
- List of AEW pay-per-view events
