= All In (professional wrestling) =

- The original All In 2018 logo; subsequent events have used a similar logo
- Created by: Cody Rhodes; Matt Jackson; Nick Jackson
- Promotions: Independent (Note: Show production was provided by Ring of Honor (ROH).) (2018); All Elite Wrestling (2023–present)
- Nicknames: "The Biggest Independent Wrestling Show Ever" (2018) "The Biggest Event in Wrestling History" (2023)
- First event: 2018

All In is a professional wrestling pay-per-view (PPV) event produced by the American promotion All Elite Wrestling (AEW) since 2023. The inaugural event was held independently in September 2018 and inspired the creation of AEW a few months later in January 2019. Since its revival under AEW, the event has been traditionally held at Wembley Stadium in London, England during the United Kingdom's August Bank Holiday weekend. All In has become the biggest show of the year for AEW and their flagship/marquee event, similar in comparison to WWE's WrestleMania, and is one of AEW's "Big Five" PPV events, along with All Out, Double or Nothing, Full Gear, and Revolution.

The inaugural 2018 event was organized and promoted by wrestlers Cody Rhodes and The Young Bucks (Matt Jackson and Nick Jackson) of a stable called The Elite, in association with the American promotion Ring of Honor (ROH), which retained the rights to the event. Rhodes, The Young Bucks, and Elite stablemate Kenny Omega would become executive vice presidents of AEW, and the company established a spiritual successor to All In called All Out. After AEW president Tony Khan purchased ROH in March 2022, he obtained the rights to All In and revived the event in 2023 as an annual summer PPV for AEW.

The inaugural event, held at the Sears Centre Arena in the Chicago suburb of Hoffman Estates, Illinois, was notable for being the first non-WWE or World Championship Wrestling promoted professional wrestling event in the United States to sell 10,000 tickets since 1993. The 2023 event at Wembley Stadium in London, England had an attendance of 72,265, the biggest in AEW's history and one of the biggest in professional wrestling. It would also be AEW's first PPV held in the United Kingdom and in an association football stadium. All In would continue to be held at Wembley during the August Bank Holiday weekend, with the exception of the 2025 event, which was held in July in the United States in Arlington, Texas as the first professional wrestling event at Globe Life Field, subsequently being AEW's first PPV event held in a baseball stadium. With an attendance of over 27,000, this became AEW's largest North American event, and third largest in company history, behind the 2023 and 2024 editions of All In, respectively. The event returned to its traditional scheduling at Wembley Stadium during the August Bank Holiday weekend in 2026.

== History ==
The inaugural All In was a professional wrestling PPV event that was independently produced by members of a wrestling stable called The Elite—specifically Cody Rhodes and The Young Bucks (Matt Jackson and Nick Jackson)—in association with the American promotion Ring of Honor (ROH). It was held on September 1, 2018, at the Sears Centre Arena in the Chicago suburb of Hoffman Estates, Illinois. The event was notable for being the first non-WWE or World Championship Wrestling (WCW) promoted professional wrestling event in the United States to sell 10,000 tickets since 1993. The success of All In would lead to the formation of All Elite Wrestling (AEW) a few months later in January 2019, with The Elite (including Kenny Omega) becoming executive vice presidents of the new company with Tony Khan as its owner and president. On the first anniversary of All In, AEW established a spiritual successor titled All Out. At the time, Khan wanted to use the All In name for AEW, but he created All Out to avoid a lawsuit with ROH, which owned the rights to All In. Khan would subsequently purchase ROH in March 2022, in turn obtaining the rights to All In.

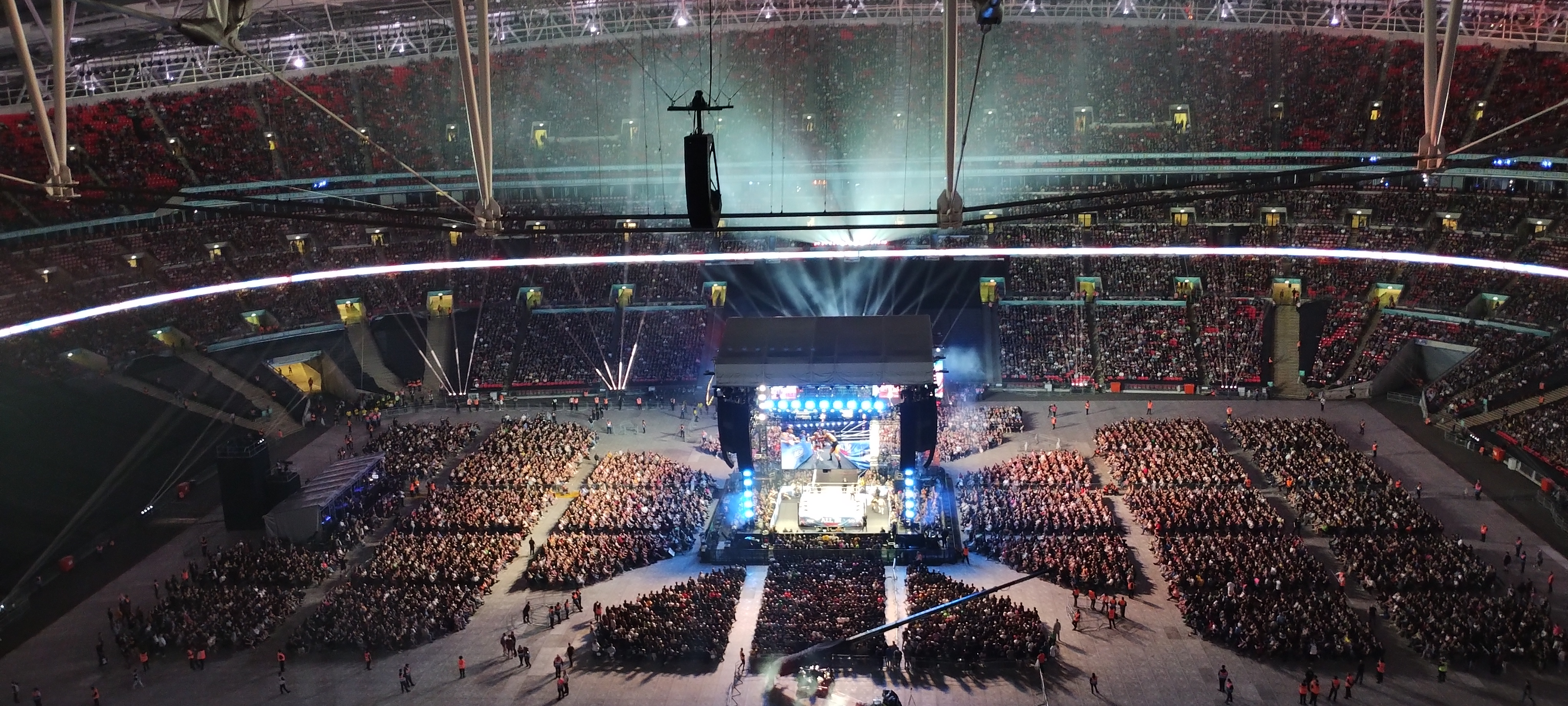
All In 2023 is AEW's highest attended event to date with a reported attendance of 72,265 people.

On the April 5, 2023, episode of AEW's flagship weekly television program Dynamite, AEW announced that they would revive the All In name for a PPV event to be held at Wembley Stadium in London, England during the United Kingdom's August Bank Holiday weekend on August 27, titled "All In London at Wembley Stadium". The event marked AEW's debut in the United Kingdom and was the promotion's first PPV to be held outside of North America. "All In London" would proceed to sell 60,000 tickets within the first three days (including pre-sale). It would go on to log a paid attendance of 72,265, the largest in company history. After the main event, which saw MJF defend the AEW World Championship against Adam Cole, it was announced that All In would return to Wembley on August 25, 2024, again during the August Bank Holiday weekend. The 2024 event would have an attendance of 46,476, the second biggest in company history behind the 2023 event.

On August 15, 2024, it was announced that the 2025 event would be held on Saturday, July 12 at Globe Life Field in Arlington, Texas, marking AEW's first PPV event to be held in a baseball stadium and in the U.S. state of Texas. This was also the first professional wrestling event held at Globe Life Field. Khan said that they were not at Wembley Stadium for 2025 as the band Coldplay had the venue booked for a tour that ran through the August Bank Holiday weekend. The 2025 event would have an attendance of over 27,000, making it their largest event in North America and third largest overall in company history, behind the 2023 and 2024 editions of All In, respectively. In October 2024, Khan referred to All In as the company's biggest show of the year. This was a position previously held by Double or Nothing, thus making All In one of AEW's "big five", along with Double or Nothing, All Out, Full Gear, and Revolution, the company's five biggest annual events. Along with the announcement of the 2025 event, it was also revealed that All In would return to Wembley Stadium in 2026. On July 17, 2025, the 2026 event's date was confirmed for August 30, returning AEW's All In to its traditional August Bank Holiday weekend scheduling.

== Events ==
#	Event	Date	City	Venue	Attendance	Main event	Ref.
Independent
1	All In (2018)	September 1, 2018	Hoffman Estates, Illinois	Sears Centre Arena	11,263	The Golden Elite (Kota Ibushi, Matt Jackson, and Nick Jackson) vs. Bandido, Rey Fénix, and Rey Mysterio	
All Elite Wrestling (AEW)
2	All In: London (2023)	August 27, 2023	London, England	Wembley Stadium	72,265	MJF (c) vs. Adam Cole for the AEW World Championship	
3	All In: London (2024)	August 25, 2024	London, England	Wembley Stadium	46,476	Swerve Strickland (c) vs. Bryan Danielson in a Title vs. Career match for the AEW World Championship	
4	All In: Texas (2025)	July 12, 2025	Arlington, Texas	Globe Life Field	21,973	Jon Moxley (c) vs. "Hangman" Adam Page in a Texas Death match for the AEW World Championship	
5	All In: London (2026)	August 30, 2026	London, England	Wembley Stadium	41,102	Kenny Omega (c) vs. Will Ospreay for the AEW World Championship	
(c) – refers to the champion(s) heading into the match
