= Now Arena =

Multi-purpose arena in Hoffman Estates, Illinois, U.S.

Coordinates: 42°4′18.10″N 88°12′34.04″W

NOW Arena
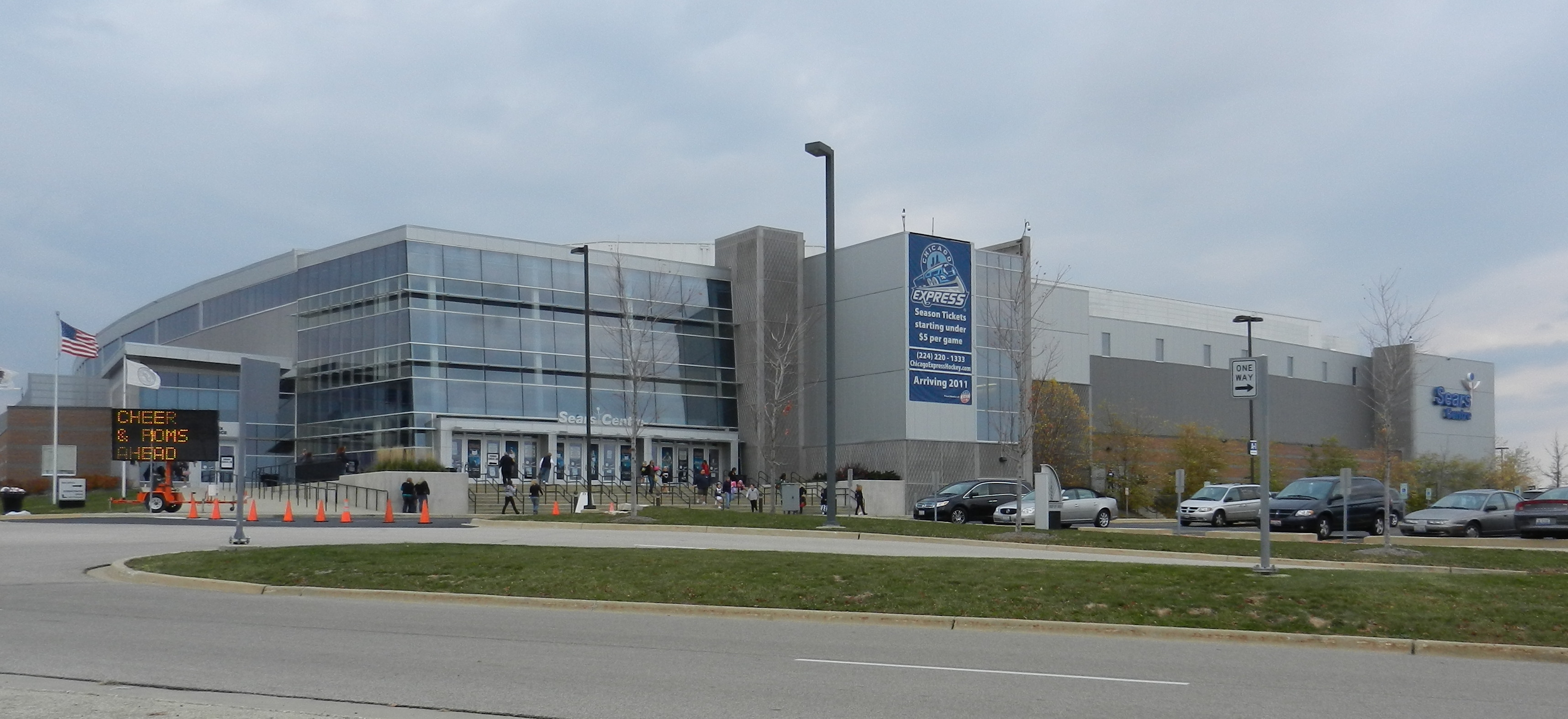
- Exterior view of the arena (c. 2011)

- Location within Illinois Location within the United States
- Former names: Sears Centre (2006–2020)
- Address: 5333 Prairie Stone Pkwy
- Location: Hoffman Estates, Illinois, U.S.
- Owner: Village of Hoffman Estates
- Operator: Spectra
- Capacity: 10,543 Detailed capacity: Center stage concerts: 11,218; End stage concerts: 7,410; Half house concerts: 5,961; Family Theater: 3,622; Concert Theater: 4,628; Basketball: 8,700; Football: 8,362; Soccer: 8,172; Lacrosse: 8,329

Construction
- Groundbreaking: July 21, 2005
- Opened: October 26, 2006
- Cost: $60 million ($98.9 million in 2025 dollars)
- Architect: RoehrSchmitt
- Project manager: GTG Consultants
- Structural engineer: Needham DBS
- Services engineer: V3 Consultants
- General contractor: Ryan Companies

Tenants
- Chicago Hounds (UHL) (2006–07); Chicago Storm (MISL II/XSL) (2006–09); Chicago Shamrox (NLL) (2007–08); Chicago Slaughter (CIFL/IFL) (2007–13); Chicago Bliss (LFL) (2009–10, 2013–14, 2018–19); Chicago Outlaws (CILL) (2011–13); Chicago Express (ECHL) (2011–12); Chicago Soul FC (MISL III) (2012–13); Chicago Mustangs (MASL/M2) (2014–15, 2017–19); Windy City Bulls (NBAGL) (2016–present)

Website
- nowarena.com

The NOW Arena (originally known as the Sears Centre, Sears Centre Arena) is a multi-purpose arena in Hoffman Estates, Illinois, a northwest suburb 25 miles (40 km) from Chicago, near land which formerly contained the Poplar Creek Music Theater. Since 2016, the arena has been home to the Windy City Bulls, the Chicago Bulls' affiliate in the NBA G League.

== History ==
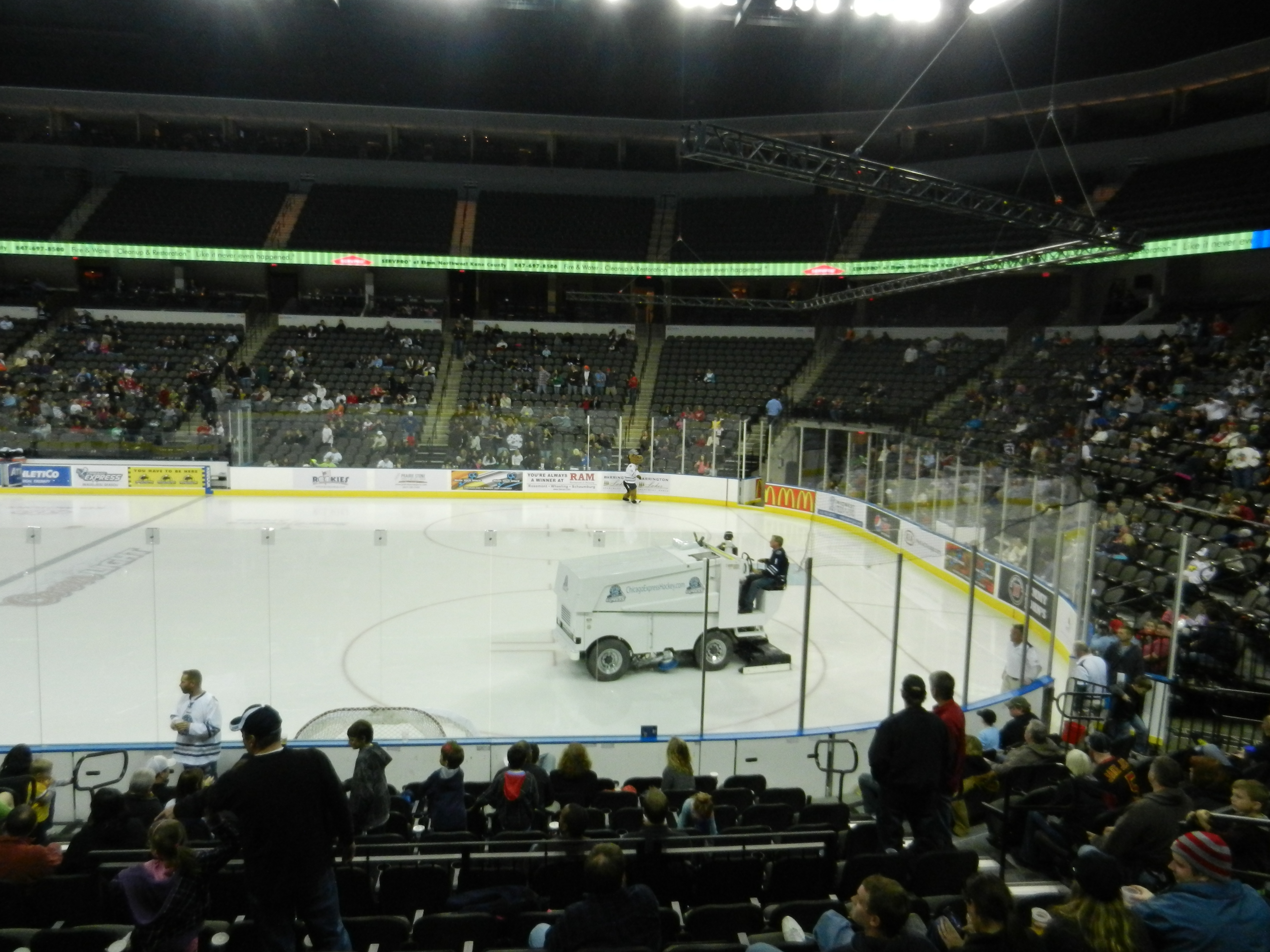
The ice surface set up for a hockey game

The venue was a joint venture between Sears Holdings, Ryan Companies, and the Village of Hoffman Estates. The project began in 1998; however, plans were not finalized until 2005. Construction began in July 2005. The venue opened as Sears Centre on October 26, 2006, with performances by Duran Duran and Bob Dylan.

In 2011, the Village of Hoffman Estates took over ownership of the arena after Ryan Companies walked away from the arena due to the arena's lack of success. However, since the village took over the arena and hired Global Spectrum to manage it, the arena has shown improvement.

The naming rights to the arena were not affected by Sears Holdings declaring bankruptcy in 2018, with the company paying $1.5 million to secure naming rights for an additional 18 months. On June 23, 2020, the Village of Hoffman Estates approved an $11.5 million deal to rename the venue to NOW Arena, with the naming rights belonging to the NOW Health Group, a family-owned natural products manufacturer based in Bloomingdale, Illinois. The name change would officially take effect on September 1, 2020.

== Notable events ==
- In 2008 and from 2010 until the present, the Illinois Recreational Cheerleading Association (IRCA) hold their annual state championship at the facility.
- On May 19 and 20, 2011, it played host to the Chicago audition stages in the first season of the Fox singer search program The X Factor.
- In 2009 and 2011, it played host to Strikeforce events.
- September 12–14, 2014: Played host to the Davis Cup, hosting matches between the United States and Slovakia.
- 2014 Skate America
- The 2017 and 2018 Ken Kraft Midlands Championships, hosted by Northwestern University's wrestling program, have been hosted at the Sears Centre.

Wrestling

- The fourth annual TNA Bound for Glory professional wrestling pay-per-view event on October 12, 2008, which was TNA's first ever event in the Chicago area.
- The arena was also the venue that featured TNA's first ever Impact Wrestling outside of Orlando, Florida, on March 14, 2013.
- September 1, 2018: All In, the largest ever independent professional wrestling event, presented by Cody Rhodes and The Young Bucks, featuring wrestlers from various independent wrestling promotions and from New Japan Pro-Wrestling, including Kenny Omega and Kazuchika Okada. This event was considered the springboard for the creation of All Elite Wrestling (AEW) several months later. In commemoration of All In, a permanent plaque was installed near the front entrance of the arena.
- August 31, 2019: hosted AEW's inaugural All Out pay-per-view event, at which AEW crowned its first world champion.
- November 27, 2019: hosted the first Thanksgiving Eve special episode of AEW Dynamite.
- September 5, 2021: hosted AEW's third annual All Out pay-per-view event
- September 4, 2022: hosted AEW's fourth annual All Out pay-per-view event.
- September 7, 2024: hosted AEW's sixth annual All Out pay-per-view event.
- December 27, 2025: hosted AEW's third annual Worlds End pay-per-view event.
- July 11, 2026: hosted the first night of New Japan Pro-Wrestling's G1 Climax 36.
- September 26, 2026: hosted AEW's eighth annual All Out pay-per-view event.

USA Gymnastics

- 2013 U.S. Challenge (July 26, 2013)
- 2013 U.S. Classic (July 27, 2013)
- 2014 U.S. Classic (August 2, 2014)
- 2015 U.S. Classic (July 25, 2015)
- 2017 U.S. Classic (July 29, 2017)
- 2023 U.S. Classic (August 4-5, 2023)
- 2025 U.S. Classic (July 18–19, 2025)

Volleyball

- 2026 FIVB Men's Volleyball Nations League (July 15-19, 2026)

Events and tenants
Preceded by UIC Pavilion	Home of the Chicago Storm; 2006–2009	Succeeded by Chicago Sports Zone
