= AEW Full Gear =

All Elite Wrestling pay-per-view event series

- AEW Full Gear logo
- Promotions: All Elite Wrestling
- First event: 2019

AEW Full Gear is a professional wrestling pay-per-view (PPV) event produced by All Elite Wrestling (AEW). Established in 2019, it is held annually in November.

== History ==
Shortly after the formation of All Elite Wrestling (AEW) in January 2019, a recurring segment of The Young Bucks' (AEW Executive Vice Presidents Matt Jackson and Nick Jackson) YouTube series Being The Elite began. The segments revolved around AEW wrestler "Hangman" Adam Page, who appeared in his full ring gear, much to the Elite's dismay. The bit was inspired by fellow AEW wrestler PAC, who attended a press conference in December, dressed only in his ring gear. The 135th episode of Being The Elite, which was uploaded on January 31, 2019, was in turn titled "Full Gear".

AEW in turn took the title and used it for their November 2019 pay-per-view (PPV) event. The inaugural Full Gear PPV took place on November 9 that year at the Royal Farms Arena in Baltimore, Maryland. The following year, a second Full Gear was held on November 7, thus establishing Full Gear as an annual PPV for AEW held around Veterans Day—this second event was held at AEW's home base of Daily's Place in Jacksonville, Florida due to the COVID-19 pandemic. AEW resumed live touring in July 2021, with the 2021 event held at the Target Center in Minneapolis, Minnesota. The 2022 event was scheduled for the Prudential Center in Newark, New Jersey, marking AEW's first PPV held in the Tri-State area.

AEW President and Chief Executive Officer Tony Khan referred to Full Gear as being one of the promotion's "Big Four" PPVs, their four biggest shows of the year produced quarterly, along with Double or Nothing, All Out, and Revolution. With All In becoming one of AEW's annual events in 2023, it supplanted Double or Nothing as AEW's marquee event, and overall biggest event of the year, with the previous "big four" plus All In becoming the "big five". Out of the five, Full Gear is the only one traditionally held on a Saturday, so as to not counter-program against the National Football League's Jacksonville Jaguars, which is also owned by the Khan family.

== Events ==
#	Event	Date	City	Venue	Main event	Ref.
1	Full Gear (2019)	November 9, 2019	Baltimore, Maryland	Royal Farms Arena	Jon Moxley vs. Kenny Omega in an Unsanctioned Lights Out match	
2	Full Gear (2020)	November 7, 2020	Jacksonville, Florida	Daily's Place	Jon Moxley (c) vs. Eddie Kingston in an "I quit" match for the AEW World Championship	
3	Full Gear (2021)	November 13, 2021	Minneapolis, Minnesota	Target Center	Kenny Omega (c) vs. "Hangman" Adam Page for the AEW World Championship	
4	Full Gear (2022)	November 19, 2022	Newark, New Jersey	Prudential Center	Jon Moxley (c) vs. MJF for the AEW World Championship	
5	Full Gear (2023)	November 18, 2023	Inglewood, California	Kia Forum	MJF (c) vs. Jay White for the AEW World Championship	
6	Full Gear (2024)	November 23, 2024	Newark, New Jersey	Prudential Center	Jon Moxley (c) vs. Orange Cassidy for the AEW World Championship	
7	Full Gear (2025)	November 22, 2025	Newark, New Jersey	Prudential Center	"Hangman" Adam Page (c) vs. Samoa Joe in a Steel Cage match for the AEW World Championship	
8	Full Gear (2026)	November 14, 2026	Phoenix, Arizona	Mortgage Matchup Center	Will Ospreay (c) vs. Kyle Fletcher for the AEW World Championship	
(c) – refers to the champion(s) heading into the match

== See also ==
- List of All Elite Wrestling pay-per-view events
