= AEW Homecoming =

All Elite Wrestling television special series

- AEW Homecoming logo, which incorporates the Daily's Place logo
- Promotions: All Elite Wrestling
- First event: 2020
- Event gimmick: AEW's return to its home venue of Daily's Place in Jacksonville, Florida

AEW Homecoming is a periodic professional wrestling television special produced by All Elite Wrestling (AEW). Established by the promotion in 2020, it celebrates the company's return to its home venue of Daily's Place in Jacksonville, Florida, and airs as special episodes of AEW's weekly television programs.

Due to the COVID-19 pandemic, most AEW shows from March 2020 to June 2021 were held at Daily's Place, but these were not held as Homecoming events due to the circumstances. Additionally, AEW's returns to Daily's Place for their weekly television programs in December 2021, March and October 2022, and April 2024, were also not held as Homecoming specials.

After events in January 2020 and August 2021, Homecoming was on hiatus before returning in January 2024. The event originally aired as a special episode of Wednesday Night Dynamite on TNT, but in 2024, it was expanded to a two-part special, also encompassing Friday Night Rampage, with Dynamite now airing on TBS and Rampage on TNT. The January 2025 event was held as a one-night special of Saturday Night Collision on TNT, which was the first Homecoming to be simulcast on the streaming service Max. A second Homecoming for 2025 was held in October as a two-part special encompassing Dynamite and Collision, with the Dynamite broadcast simultaneously being the fourth Title Tuesday event, branded as "Homecoming: Title Tuesday".

== History ==
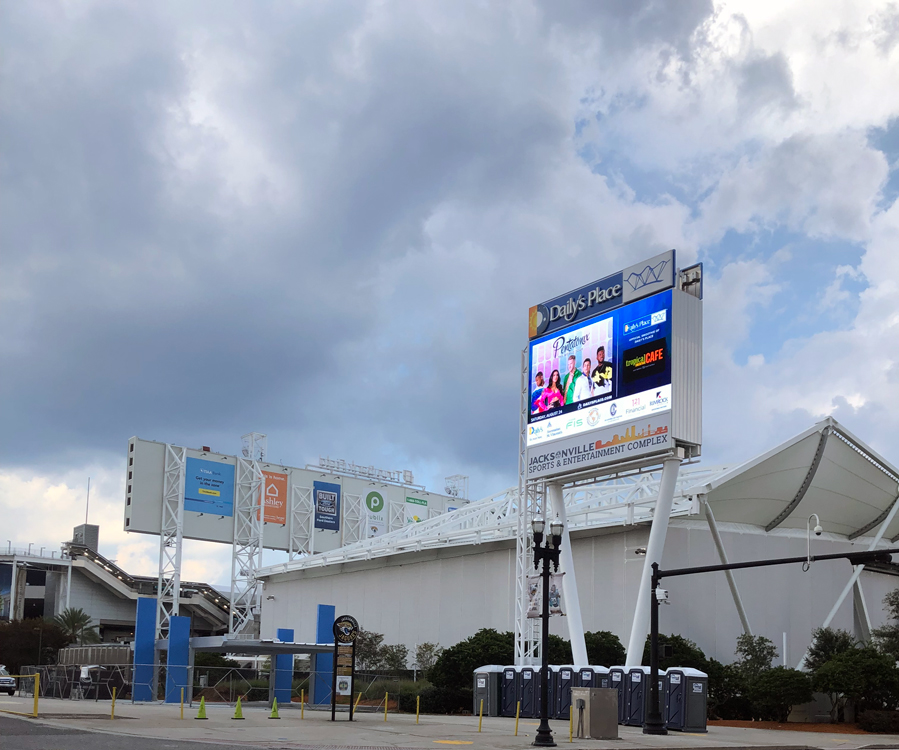
The Homecoming special celebrates All Elite Wrestling's return to its home venue of Daily's Place in Jacksonville, Florida

After the American professional wrestling promotion All Elite Wrestling (AEW) was founded in January 2019, the company held its third-ever event, Fight for the Fallen, on July 13 that year at Daily's Place in Jacksonville, Florida. Daily's Place is an open-air amphitheater located on the same complex as the EverBank Stadium (formerly TIAA Bank Field; renamed in 2023), the home stadium of the Jacksonville Jaguars, a National Football League team that is also owned by AEW President and Chief Executive Officer Tony Khan. As such, the stadium itself is AEW's de facto headquarters, with Daily's Place becoming AEW's home base. On January 1, 2020, AEW held a special episode of its weekly television program, Wednesday Night Dynamite on TNT, at Daily's Place titled Homecoming, in reference to the venue.

Due to the COVID-19 pandemic that began effecting the industry in mid-March 2020, AEW held the majority of its programs from Daily's Place; these events were originally held without fans, but the company began running shows at 10–15% capacity in August, before eventually running full capacity shows in May 2021. Although held at Daily's Place, these shows were not "Homecoming" events due to the circumstances. In May, AEW announced that it would be returning to live touring, beginning with a special episode of Dynamite titled Road Rager on July 7. Road Rager was also the first of a four-week span of special Dynamite episodes as part of AEW's "Welcome Back" tour, which continued with the two-part Fyter Fest on July 14 and 21 and concluded with Fight for the Fallen on July 28. In early July, AEW scheduled a second Homecoming episode to be held after the conclusion of the "Welcome Back" tour, briefly returning AEW to Daily's Place on August 4. The event was promoted as the final event to be held at Daily's Place for Summer 2021. AEW would then return to Daily's Place in December that year, but that event was held as the New Year's Smash special.

Although AEW returned to Daily's Place in 2022 for episodes of Dynamite and their secondary program, Friday Night Rampage (which premiered on TNT on August 13, 2021), these were regular episodes that were not produced as Homecoming specials. AEW did not hold any shows at Daily's Place in 2023, but scheduled a return to the venue in January 2024. The company in turn revived the Homecoming special with the third event held on January 10, 2024. Unlike the prior two events, the 2024 Homecoming expanded the show to a two-part special, with the first part airing live as a special episode of Dynamite on TBS (the program moved from TNT to TBS in January 2022), with the second part taped the same night to air on tape delay on January 12 as a special episode of Rampage on TNT. AEW returned to Daily's Place in late April 2024 for episodes of Dynamite, Rampage, and its third program, Saturday Night Collision (which premiered on TNT in June 2023), but these were not held as Homecoming specials.

The first Collision to be a Homecoming special was the January 2025 event, scheduled for January 25. This also reduced Homecoming back to a one-night event, following Rampage's cancellation at the end of December 2024. This was also the first Homecoming to be simulcast on the streaming service Max. A second Homecoming for 2025 was scheduled as a two-part event in October, airing as the October 7 and October 11 episodes of Dynamite and Collision, respectively (Collision was taped on October 8 to air on tape delay). The Dynamite broadcast was also simultaneously the fourth annual Title Tuesday special, another one of AEW's specials of Dynamite that is themed around championship matches and is held on one Tuesday in October due to a scheduling conflict with Major League Baseball on TNT Sports channels. The Dynamite broadcast was in turn branded as Homecoming: Title Tuesday.

== Events ==
All AEW Homecoming events are held at Daily's Place in Jacksonville, Florida.

#	Event	Date	Main event	Ref.
1	Homecoming (2020)	Dynamite; January 1, 2020	The Elite (Kenny Omega, Matt Jackson, and Nick Jackson) vs. Death Triangle (Pac, Pentagón Jr., and Rey Fénix)	
2	Homecoming (2021)	Dynamite; August 4, 2021	Malakai Black vs. Cody Rhodes	
3	Homecoming (2024)	Night 1: Dynamite; January 10, 2024	Sting and Darby Allin vs. Don Callis Family (Konosuke Takeshita and Powerhouse Hobbs) in a Texas Tornado match	
3	Homecoming (2024)	Night 2: Rampage; January 10, 2024 (aired January 12)	The Dark Order (Evil Uno, John Silver, and Alex Reynolds) vs. Matt Menard, Angelo Parker, and Jake Hager	
4	Homecoming (January 2025)	Collision; January 25, 2025	Konosuke Takeshita (c) vs. Katsuyori Shibata for the AEW International Championship	
5	Homecoming (October 2025)	Night 1: Dynamite: Title Tuesday; October 7, 2025	Orange Cassidy vs. Pac	
5	Homecoming (October 2025)	Night 2: Collision; October 8, 2025 (aired October 11)	Top Gods (Megan Bayne, Cash Wheeler, and Dax Harwood) vs. Willow Nightingale and JetSpeed (Kevin Knight and "Speedball" Mike Bailey)	
(c) – refers to the champion(s) heading into the match

== Results ==
=== 2020 ===
Homecoming
- Promotional poster featuring various AEW wrestlers
- Promotion: All Elite Wrestling
- Date: January 1, 2020
- City: Jacksonville, Florida
- Venue: Daily's Place
- Attendance: 3,900
- Tagline: Join Us New Year's Day

Homecoming chronology
← Previous; First	Next → 2021

AEW Dynamite special episodes chronology
← Previous; Thanksgiving Eve Dynamite	Next → Bash at the Beach

The 2020 Homecoming was the inaugural Homecoming television special produced by AEW. The event marked the promotion's return to its home base of Daily's Place in Jacksonville, Florida, following the company's debut at the venue during Fight for the Fallen in July the previous year. It was held on New Year's Day on January 1, 2020, and was broadcast on TNT as a special episode of AEW's weekly television program, Wednesday Night Dynamite.

The 2020 Homecoming averaged 967,000 television viewers on TNT and a 0.36 rating in AEW's key demographic.

No.	Results	Stipulations	Times
1	Cody (with Arn Anderson) defeated Darby Allin	Singles match	17:20
2	Riho (c) defeated Britt Baker, Hikaru Shida, and Nyla Rose	Four-way match for the AEW Women's World Championship	9:50
3	Jon Moxley defeated Trent (with Chuck Taylor and Orange Cassidy)	Singles match	11:00
4	Sammy Guevara defeated Dustin Rhodes	Singles match	11:20
5	The Elite (Kenny Omega, Matt Jackson, and Nick Jackson) defeated Death Triangle (Pac, Pentagón Jr., and Rey Fénix)	Six-man tag team match	12:25
(c) / – the champion(s) heading into the match

=== 2021 ===
Homecoming
- Promotional poster featuring various AEW wrestlers
- Promotion: All Elite Wrestling
- Date: August 4, 2021
- City: Jacksonville, Florida
- Venue: Daily's Place
- Attendance: 3,200

Homecoming chronology
← Previous; 2020	Next → 2024

AEW Dynamite special episodes chronology
← Previous; Fight for the Fallen	Next → Grand Slam

The 2021 Homecoming was the second Homecoming television special produced by AEW. The event marked a brief return to AEW's home venue of Daily's Place in Jacksonville, Florida, which is where they had produced shows through the majority of the COVID-19 pandemic (March 2020 – June 2021), and came after the conclusion of AEW's "Welcome Back" tour, which celebrated the company's resumption of live touring. It was held on August 4, 2021, and was broadcast on TNT as a special episode of AEW's weekly television program, Wednesday Night Dynamite. This was the final Homecoming special produced until 2024, as despite AEW returning to Daily's Place in December 2021 and then in March and October 2022 for episodes of Dynamite and their Friday night program Rampage, these were not produced as Homecoming specials, and no shows were held at Daily's Place in 2023.

The 2021 Homecoming averaged 1,102,000 television viewers on TNT, with a 0.46 rating in AEW's key demographic.

No.	Results	Stipulations	Times
1	Chris Jericho defeated Juventud Guerrera	Singles match Jericho had to perform a top rope maneuver to win.	9:55
2	Jon Moxley, Eddie Kingston, and Darby Allin (with Sting) defeated 2.0 (Matt Lee and Jeff Parker) and Daniel Garcia	Six-man tag team match	10:10
3	Christian Cage defeated The Blade (with The Bunny)	Singles match	10:15
4	Miro (c) defeated Lee Johnson (with Dustin Rhodes)	Singles match for the AEW TNT Championship	9:50
5	Leyla Hirsch defeated The Bunny	NWA World Women's Championship Eliminator Match; The winner became the #1 contender to the NWA World Women's Championship	8:20
6	Malakai Black defeated Cody Rhodes	Singles match	5:10
(c) / – the champion(s) heading into the match

=== 2024 ===
Homecoming
- Promotional poster featuring various AEW wrestlers
- Promotion: All Elite Wrestling
- Date: January 10, 2024 (aired January 10 and 12, 2024)
- City: Jacksonville, Florida
- Venue: Daily's Place
- Attendance: 3,183

Homecoming chronology
← Previous; 2021	Next → January 2025

AEW Dynamite special episodes chronology
← Previous; New Year's Smash	Next → Big Business

AEW Rampage special episodes chronology
← Previous; New Year's Smash	Next → Beach Break

The 2024 Homecoming was the third Homecoming television special produced by AEW. The event marked the company's return to its home venue of Daily's Place in Jacksonville, Florida for the first time since October 2022, although it was the first Homecoming special since 2021. It was held on January 10, 2024. Unlike the prior two Homecoming specials, which only aired as a special episode of Wednesday Night Dynamite, the 2024 event expanded Homecoming to a two-part special, also encompassing Friday Night Rampage. Dynamite aired live on TBS while Rampage aired on tape delay on January 12 on TNT. The event also paid tribute to Mr. Brodie Lee, an AEW wrestler and leader of The Dark Order who was a prominent figure during the company's time at Daily's Place during the COVID-19 pandemic from March to October 2020 before his death that December.

Dynamite (aired live January 10)
No.	Results	Stipulations	Times
1	"Hangman" Adam Page defeated Claudio Castagnoli by pinfall	Singles match	17:00
2	Adam Copeland, Dustin Rhodes, Orange Cassidy, and Preston Vance defeated Lance Archer and The Mogul Embassy (Brian Cage, Bishop Kaun, and Toa Liona) (with Jake Roberts and Prince Nana) by pinfall	Brodie Lee memorial Eight-man tag team match	10:25
3	Sammy Guevara defeated Ricky Starks by pinfall	Singles match	9:00
4	Anna Jay, Kris Statlander, Thunder Rosa, and Willow Nightingale defeated Julia Hart, Skye Blue, and The Outcasts (Saraya and Ruby Soho) (with Harley Cameron) by submission	Brodie Lee memorial Eight-woman tag team match	9:00
5	Roderick Strong (with Adam Cole, Matt Taven, Mike Bennett, and Wardlow) defeated Bryan Keith by pinfall	Singles match	4:20
6	Sting and Darby Allin (with Ric Flair) defeated Don Callis Family (Konosuke Takeshita and Powerhouse Hobbs) (with Don Callis) by pinfall	Texas Tornado match	10:00

Rampage (taped January 10; aired January 12)
No.	Results	Stipulations	Times
1	Eddie Kingston (c) defeated Wheeler Yuta by pinfall	Singles match for the Continental Crown Championship (AEW Continental Championship, ROH World Championship, and the NJPW Strong Openweight Championship)	17:50
2	Swerve Strickland (with Prince Nana) defeated Matt Sydal by pinfall	Singles match	4:00
3	Hikaru Shida defeated Queen Aminata by pinfall	Singles match	9:00
4	The Dark Order (Evil Uno, John Silver, and Alex Reynolds) (with "Negative One" Brodie Lee Jr.) defeated Matt Menard, Angelo Parker, and Jake Hager by pinfall	Brodie Lee memorial Trios match	10:00
(c) / – the champion(s) heading into the match

=== 2025 ===
==== January ====
Homecoming
- Promotional poster featuring various AEW wrestlers
- Promotion: All Elite Wrestling
- Date: January 25, 2025
- City: Jacksonville, Florida
- Venue: Daily's Place
- Attendance: 2,986

Homecoming chronology
← Previous; 2024	Next → October 2025

AEW Collision special episodes chronology
← Previous; Maximum Carnage	Next → Spring BreakThru

AEW special event chronology
← Previous; Maximum Carnage	Next → Grand Slam Australia

The January 2025 Homecoming was the fourth Homecoming television special produced by AEW. Although the company held shows at Daily's Place in Jacksonville, Florida in April 2024, this was the first Homecoming special at the venue since January that year. It was held on January 25, 2025. Unlike the prior year, which aired as a two-part special encompassing Wednesday Night Dynamite and Friday Night Rampage, the 2025 event was reduced back to one night and was the first Homecoming to air as a special episode of Saturday Night Collision. The special was simulcast live on TNT and Max, which was the first Homecoming to be simulcast on Max.

No.	Results	Stipulations	Times
1	Samoa Joe (with Hook and Katsuyori Shibata) defeated Nick Wayne (with Christian Cage, Mother Wayne, and Kip Sabian) by pinfall	Singles match	5:25
2	Kazuchika Okada defeated Komander (with Alex Abrahantes) by pinfall	Singles match	9:00
3	The Undisputed Kingdom (Adam Cole, Kyle O'Reilly, and Roderick Strong) defeated Daniel Garcia, "Cool Hand" Angelo Parker, and "Daddy Magic" Matt Menard by pinfall	Trios match	9:50
4	Hounds of Hell (Brody King and Buddy Matthews) (with Julia Hart) defeated Gates of Agony (Bishop Kaun and Toa Liona) by pinfall	Tag team match	9:05
5	Yuka Sakazaki defeated Deonna Purrazzo (with Taya Valkyrie), Queen Aminata, and Serena Deeb by pinfall	Four-way match to determine the #1 contender for the AEW TBS Championship	9:30
6	Konosuke Takeshita (c) defeated Katsuyori Shibata by pinfall	Singles match for the AEW International Championship	13:30
(c) / – the champion(s) heading into the match

==== October ====
Homecoming
- Promotional poster featuring various AEW wrestlers
- Promotion: All Elite Wrestling
- Date: October 7 and 8, 2025
- City: Jacksonville, Florida
- Venue: Daily's Place
- Attendance: 2,885 (Dynamite); 1,968 (Collision)
- Tagline: Title Tuesday (October 7 broadcast)

Homecoming chronology
← Previous; January 2025	Next → —

Title Tuesday chronology
← Previous; 2024	Next → —

The October 2025 Homecoming is the ongoing fifth Homecoming television special produced by AEW. This marked the first Homecoming to be held twice in one year, after the January 2025 event, as well as expanding it back to a two-part special, encompassing Wednesday Night Dynamite and Saturday Night Collision. The first part was a live episode of Dynamite on TBS and HBO Max, which was also simultaneously the fourth annual Title Tuesday special and branded as Homecoming: Title Tuesday, while the second part was taped on October 8 to air as the October 11 episode of Collision on TNT and Max.

Dynamite: Title Tuesday (aired live October 7)
No.	Results	Stipulations	Times
1	Jon Moxley (with Marina Shafir) defeated Tomohiro Ishii by referee stoppage	Singles match	12:59
2	The Hurt Syndicate (Bobby Lashley, Shelton Benjamin, and MVP) defeated The Demand (Ricochet, Bishop Kaun, and Toa Liona) by pinfall	Street Fight	16:40
3	Jurassic Express (Jack Perry and Luchasaurus) defeated Orion and KM by pinfall	Tag team match	2:40
4	Kyle Fletcher (c) defeated Kyle O'Reilly by pinfall	Singles match for the AEW TNT Championship	12:55
5	Mercedes Moné (c) defeated Lacey Lane by pinfall	Singles match for the AEW TBS Championship; This was an open challenge.	9:40
6	Don Callis Family (Konosuke Takeshita and Kazuchika Okada) defeated Brodido (Brody King and Bandido) by pinfall	Double Jeopardy Eliminator match Had Brodido won, whoever got the pin would have earned a future AEW Continental Championship match. Since Takeshita and Okada won, they earned a future AEW World Tag Team Championship match.	11:55
7	Orange Cassidy defeated Pac by pinfall	Singles match	15:00
(c) / – the champion(s) heading into the match

Collision (taped October 8, aired October 11)
No.	Results	Stipulations	Times
1	Josh Alexander defeated Kota Ibushi by countout	Singles match	14:00
2	Anthony Bowens and Max Caster defeated Big Bill and Bryan Keith by pinfall	Tag team match	10:20
3	TayJay (Tay Melo and Anna Jay) defeated Carolina Cruz and Dream Girl Ellie by pinfall	Tag team match	2:10
4	Triangle of Madness (Julia Hart, Skye Blue, and Thekla) defeated Kris Statlander, "Timeless" Toni Storm, and Harley Cameron by pinfall	Trios match	11:25
5	La Facción Ingobernable (Rush, Dralístico, and Sammy Guevara) (with The Beast Mortos) defeated MxM TV (Johnny TV, Mansoor, and Mason Madden) (with Taya Valkyrie) by pinfall	Trios match	3:45
6	Eddie Kingston defeated The Beast Mortos (with Rush, Dralístico, and Sammy Guevara) by pinfall	Singles match	8:00
7	Top Gods (Megan Bayne, Cash Wheeler, and Dax Harwood) (with Stokely and Penelope Ford) defeated Willow Nightingale and JetSpeed (Kevin Knight and "Speedball" Mike Bailey) by pinfall	Mixed trios match	14:40

== See also ==
- List of AEW Collision special episodes
- List of AEW Dynamite special episodes
- List of AEW Rampage special episodes
- List of All Elite Wrestling special events
