= New Year's Smash (January 2021) =

All Elite Wrestling two-part television special

AEW New Year's Smash
- Promotional poster for Night 1 featuring various AEW wrestlers
- Promotion: All Elite Wrestling
- Date: January 6 and 7, 2021 (aired January 6 and 13, 2021)
- City: Jacksonville, Florida
- Venue: Daily's Place
- Attendance: Night 1: 770; Night 2: 0 (behind closed doors)

New Year's Smash chronology
← Previous; First	Next → December 2021

AEW Dynamite special episodes chronology
← Previous; Brodie Lee Celebration of Life	Next → Beach Break

The January 2021 New Year's Smash was the inaugural New Year's Smash professional wrestling television special produced by All Elite Wrestling (AEW). The two-part event took place on January 6 and 7, 2021, at Daily's Place in Jacksonville, Florida and was broadcast on TNT as special episodes of AEW's weekly television program, Dynamite. Night 1 aired live on January 6, while Night 2 was taped on January 7 and aired on tape delay on January 13. The event was originally supposed to begin on December 30, 2020, and end on January 6, 2021, but was postponed by a week due to the death of AEW wrestler Brodie Lee; the December 30 episode was instead held as a memorial event for Lee.

In the main event of night one, Kenny Omega defeated Rey Fénix to retain the AEW World Championship. In night two's main event, Darby Allin defeated Brian Cage to retain the AEW TNT Championship.

== Production ==
Other on-screen personnel
Role	Name
Commentators	Jim Ross
Commentators	Excalibur
Commentators	Tony Schiavone
Commentators	Chris Jericho (Night 1)
Commentators	Taz (Allin vs. Cage)
Ring announcer	Justin Roberts
Referees	Aubrey Edwards
Referees	Bryce Remsburg
Referees	Mike Posey
Referees	Paul Turner
Referees	Rick Knox
Interviewers	Alex Marvez
Interviewers	Dasha Gonzalez

=== Background ===
On the December 9, 2020, episode of Dynamite, All Elite Wrestling (AEW) announced that the December 30, 2020, and January 6, 2021, episodes would be a two-part event titled "New Year's Smash". However, on December 28, it was announced that the event had been postponed to January 6 and 13, 2021, due to the death of AEW wrestler Brodie Lee on December 26. Night 1 of New Year's Smash aired live while Night 2 was taped on January 7 and aired on tape delay on January 13. The December 30 episode was in turn held as a memorial event titled Brodie Lee Celebration of Life, featuring matches and segments with fellow wrestlers honoring and paying tribute to Lee.

As part of a tie-in with TBS's Go-Big Show, in which former AEW executive and wrestler Cody Rhodes served as a judge, rapper Snoop Dogg, who was also a judge on the show, was announced to make a special appearance during New Year's Smash. On December 23 at Holiday Bash, it was announced that Jon Moxley would return on Night 1 of the event. During the Brodie Lee Celebration of Life event, it was announced that Sting would also make an appearance on Night 1. Also announced for Night 1 was an AEW TNT Championship weigh-in between champion Darby Allin and challenger Brian Cage, with the title match taking place on Night 2.

=== Storylines ===
New Year's Smash featured professional wrestling matches that involved different wrestlers from pre-existing scripted feuds and storylines. Wrestlers portray heroes, villains, or less distinguishable characters in scripted events that built tension and culminated in a wrestling match or series of matches. Storylines were produced on AEW's weekly television program, Dynamite, the supplementary online streaming show, Dark, and The Young Bucks' YouTube series Being The Elite.

Rey Fenix was originally scheduled to face Kenny Omega on October 28, 2020, in the AEW World Championship Eliminator Tournament, but was replaced by Penta El Zero Miedo due to an injury Fenix sustained in his previous bout. On the December 16, 2020 episode of Dynamite, it was announced that Omega would defend AEW World Championship against Fenix on Night 1.

On the November 25 episode of Dynamite, Hikaru Shida retained her AEW Women's World Championship against Anna Jay. After the match, Abadon made her return and went after Shida and her title. On December 23 at Holiday Bash, it was announced that Shida would defend her title against Abadon on Night 1.

Taz first offered to help Darby Allin as his manager during a backstage interview on May 6, 2020, after Allin lost to Cody Rhodes one week prior. On May 23 at Double or Nothing, Taz accompanied the debuting Brian Cage in the Casino Ladder match, a match Allin was also competing in, which Cage won. On September 5 at All Out, Cage eliminated Allin in the Casino Battle Royale after putting him in a body bag with thumbtacks and powerbombing him over the top rope. On November 7 at Full Gear, Allin defeated Rhodes to win the AEW TNT Championship and after the match, Team Taz (Cage and Ricky Starks) beat down Allin and Rhodes. This led to a tag team match on the November 18 episode of Dynamite, pitting Team Taz against Allin and Rhodes, in which Cage pinned Allin to win. On December 23 at Holiday Bash, it was announced that Allin would defend the TNT Championship against Cage on Night 2.

After an eight-month absence from television, Pac returned to AEW on the November 11, 2020 episode of Dynamite, where he confronted Eddie Kingston. During Pac's absence, Kingston had formed a stable composed of The Butcher and The Blade and Lucha Brothers (Rey Fenix and Penta El Zero Miedo), the latter of the two being Pac's former stablemates. Fenix and Penta would reunite with Pac on the November 18 episode of Dynamite to reform their stable Death Triangle. The trio began feuding with Kingston, The Butcher and The Blade, and on December 30 at Brodie Lee Celebration of Life, it was announced that Pac vs. Kingston would take place on Night 2.

== Reception ==
The first night of the event was held live and attended by 770 people, with 650 of those being paid fans, and the rest being AEW personnel who sat at ringside. Night 2 was pre-taped, and took place with no paying fans in attendance for security reasons. Wrestling journalist Dave Meltzer of Wrestling Observer Newsletter gave Omega–Fenix a rating of 5 stars, making it the sixth AEW match to be rated 5 stars or more by Meltzer. He also rated the eight-man tag team match 4 stars, and Allin–Cage 4.25 stars.

=== Television ratings ===
The first night of New Year's Smash averaged 662,000 television viewers on TNT and a 0.25 rating in AEW's key demographic. The second night of New Year's Smash drew 762,000 viewers, and achieved a rating of 0.30 in the key demographic.

== Aftermath ==
During Night 2, the match card for the next Dynamite on January 20 was announced: Jon Moxley in action, Penelope Ford vs. Leyla Hirsch, Chris Jericho and MJF vs. Santana and Ortiz vs. Sammy Guevara and Jake Hager to determine the official tag team of The Inner Circle, Matt Sydal and Top Flight vs. Matt Hardy and Private Party, Cody Rhodes vs. Peter Avalon, and Adam Page and The Dark Order (Colt Cabana and Alex Reynolds and John Silver) vs. Chaos Project (Luther and Serpentico) and The Hybrid 2, billed as Brodie Lee Jr.'s (-1) birthday celebration match. Page has said he will reveal whether or not he will join The Dark Order after their match. Several segments were also announced: AEW World Champion Kenny Omega reflects on his dominance, Sting congratulates AEW TNT Champion Darby Allin, and an update from Miro and his new butler Chuck Taylor.

A second New Year's Smash was held in December, thus establishing New Year's Smash as AEW's New Year's television special. Additionally, while the second event retained its two-part format, the first part aired as Dynamite while the second part instead aired as the same week's episode of Friday Night Rampage, a second weekly program that began airing in August.

== Results ==
Night 1 (January 6)
No.	Results	Stipulations	Times
1	The Young Bucks (Matt Jackson and Nick Jackson) and SoCal Uncensored (Christopher Daniels and Frankie Kazarian) defeated The Acclaimed (Anthony Bowens and Max Caster) and The Hybrid 2 (Angelico and Jack Evans)	Eight-man tag team match	9:59
2	Wardlow defeated Jake Hager	Singles match	10:17
3	Cody Rhodes (with Snoop Dogg) defeated Matt Sydal	Singles match	10:03
4	Hikaru Shida (c) defeated Abadon	Singles match for the AEW Women's World Championship	8:27
5	Kenny Omega (c) (with Don Callis) defeated Rey Fenix	Singles match for the AEW World Championship	17:00
(c) / – the champion(s) heading into the match

Night 2 (January 13)
No.	Results	Stipulations	Times
1	Pac (with Lucha Brothers) defeated Eddie Kingston (with The Butcher, The Blade, and The Bunny)	Singles match	9:31
2	Miro (with Kip Sabian and Penelope Ford) defeated Chuck Taylor (with Orange Cassidy) by submission	Singles match Since Taylor lost, he was forced to be Miro's butler until Sabian and Ford's wedding at Beach Break.	3:32
3	The Elite (Kenny Omega, Doc Gallows and Karl Anderson) (with Don Callis) defeated Danny Limelight and Varsity Blonds (Brian Pillman Jr. and Griff Garrison)	Six-man tag team match	9:21
4	FTR (Cash Wheeler and Dax Harwood) (with Tully Blanchard) defeated Jurassic Express (Jungle Boy and Marko Stunt)	Tag team match	12:16
5	Serena Deeb (c) defeated Tay Conti (with Anna Jay)	Singles match for the NWA World Women's Championship	9:28
6	Darby Allin (c) defeated Brian Cage (with Ricky Starks and Hook)	Singles match for the AEW TNT Championship	13:47
(c) / – the champion(s) heading into the match

== See also ==
- 2021 in professional wrestling
