= New Year's Smash (2022) =

All Elite Wrestling two-part television special

- Promotion: All Elite Wrestling
- Date: December 28, 2022 (aired December 28 and 30, 2022)
- City: Broomfield, Colorado
- Venue: 1stBank Center
- Attendance: 4,229

New Year's Smash chronology
← Previous; December 2021	Next → 2023

AEW Dynamite special episodes chronology
← Previous; Holiday Bash	Next → Blood & Guts

AEW Rampage special episodes chronology
← Previous; Holiday Bash	Next → Royal Rampage

The 2022 New Year's Smash was the third New Year's Smash professional wrestling television special produced by All Elite Wrestling (AEW). It took place on December 28, 2022, at the 1stBank Center in Broomfield, Colorado. The two-part event was broadcast as special episodes of AEW's weekly television programs, Wednesday Night Dynamite and Friday Night Rampage. Dynamite aired live on TBS while Rampage aired on tape delay on December 30 on TNT.

== Production ==
=== Background ===
New Year's Smash is a two-part television special held around New Year's by All Elite Wrestling (AEW) since January 2021. On October 18, 2022, AEW announced that the third New Year's Smash would return live on December 28 for Wednesday Night Dynamite on TBS and an episode of Friday Night Rampage that would air on tape delay on December 30 on TNT. The event took place at the 1stBank Center in Broomfield, Colorado.

=== Storylines ===
New Year's Smash featured professional wrestling matches that involved different wrestlers from pre-existing scripted feuds and storylines. Wrestlers portrayed heroes, villains, or less distinguishable characters in scripted events that built tension and culminated in a wrestling match or series of matches. Storylines were produced on AEW's weekly television programs, Dynamite and Rampage, the supplementary online streaming shows, Dark and Elevation, and The Young Bucks' YouTube series Being The Elite.

At Full Gear, Death Triangle (Pac, Penta El Zero Miedo, and Rey Fénix) defeated The Elite (Kenny Omega, Matt Jackson, and Nick Jackson) to retain the AEW World Trios Championship. Afterwards, it was announced that the Full Gear match was the first in a Best of Seven Series for the championship. Death Triangle would again defeat The Elite on the following episode of Dynamite, but The Elite gained a win on the next week's episode. At Winter Is Coming, Death Triangle secured another win to lead the series at 3–1. The Elite then gained another win at Dynamite: Holiday Bash to bring the series to 3–2, with the sixth match scheduled for Dynamite: New Year's Smash as a Falls Count Anywhere match.

== Aftermath ==
With The Elite's (Kenny Omega, Matt Jackson, and Nick Jackson) win over Death Triangle (Pac, Penta El Zero Miedo, and Rey Fénix), the series tied at 3–3. The seventh and final match took place on the January 11, 2023 episode of Dynamite as a ladder match where The Elite defeated Death Triangle to become two-time AEW World Trios Champions.

== Results ==
Dynamite (aired live December 28)
No.	Results	Stipulations	Times
1	Bryan Danielson defeated Ethan Page (with Stokely Hathaway) by technical submission	Singles match	17:39
2	Blackpool Combat Club (Jon Moxley and Claudio Castagnoli) (with Wheeler Yuta) defeated Top Flight (Dante Martin and Darius Martin) by pinfall	Tag team match	13:55
3	Hook defeated Baylum Lynx by submission	Singles match	0:51
4	The Elite (Kenny Omega, Matt Jackson, and Nick Jackson) (with Michael Nakazawa and Brandon Cutler) defeated Death Triangle (Pac, Penta El Zero Miedo, and Rey Fénix) (with Alex Abrahantes)	Falls Count Anywhere Six-man tag team match Match six in a Best of Seven Series for the AEW World Trios Championship (Series tied 3–3)	16:02
5	TayJay A.S. (Tay Melo and Anna Jay A.S.) defeated Willow Nightingale and Ruby Soho	Tag team match	5:03
6	Samoa Joe (c) defeated Wardlow	Singles match for the AEW TNT Championship	10:48
(c) / – the champion(s) heading into the match

Rampage (aired on tape delay December 30)
No.	Results	Stipulations	Times
1	Orange Cassidy (c) (with Danhausen) defeated Trent Beretta (with Chuck Taylor) by pinfall	Singles match for the AEW All-Atlantic Championship	11:20
2	Kip Sabian (with Penelope Ford) defeated Atiba by pinfall	Singles match	1:20
3	Jade Cargill (c) (with The Baddies (Leila Grey and Red Velvet)) defeated Kiera Hogan by pinfall	Singles match for the AEW TBS Championship	7:30
4	Swerve Strickland (with Mogul Affiliates (Parker Boudreaux and Granden Goetzman) defeated Wheeler Yuta by pinfall	Singles match	12:25
(c) / – the champion(s) heading into the match
