= AEW New Year's Smash =

All Elite Wrestling television special series

- AEW New Year's Smash logo
- Promotions: All Elite Wrestling
- First event: January 2021

AEW New Year's Smash is an annual professional wrestling television special produced by the American promotion All Elite Wrestling (AEW). Established in 2021, the event is held around New Year's. The original January 2021 event aired as two back-to-back special episodes of AEW's flagship program, Wednesday Night Dynamite. The second event, which aired in December 2021, took place in the same week, first as an episode of Dynamite, then as a special episode of Friday Night Rampage, with the events in 2022 and 2023 retaining this format. The 2024 event featured only Rampage due to Dynamite airing as a different special that week.

The Dynamite broadcast for the December 2021 event was the final Dynamite to air on TNT before the show moved to TNT's sister channel TBS; Rampage remained on TNT. The 2024 event was the final episode of Rampage due to the program's cancellation.

== History ==
On the December 9, 2020, episode of Wednesday Night Dynamite, All Elite Wrestling (AEW) announced that the December 30, 2020, and January 6, 2021, episodes would be a two-part event titled "New Year's Smash". However, on December 28, it was announced that the event had been postponed to January 6 and 13, 2021, due to the death of AEW wrestler Brodie Lee, with the December 30 episode instead being held as a memorial event for Lee. Night 1 of New Year's Smash aired live on January 6, while Night 2 was taped on January 7 and aired on tape delay on January 13.

On the November 19, 2021, episode of AEW's secondary program, Friday Night Rampage (which began airing in August), AEW announced New Year's Smash would return as the December 29 episode of Dynamite (the final episode of Dynamite on TNT before its move to TBS) and the New Year's Eve episode of Rampage. Dynamite aired live while Rampage aired on tape delay on December 31. This in turn established New Year's Smash as AEW's New Year's event, with the 2022 and 2023 events retaining the Dynamite and Rampage broadcast format. The 2024 event reduced it to just Rampage due to Dynamite airing as a different special that week. It was also the final episode of Rampage as the program was not included in AEW's media rights deal with Warner Bros. Discovery that took effect on January 1, 2025.

== Events ==
#	Event	Date	City	Venue	Main event	Ref.
1	New Year's Smash (January 2021)	Night 1: Dynamite; January 6, 2021	Jacksonville, Florida	Daily's Place	Kenny Omega (c) vs. Rey Fénix for the AEW World Championship	
1	New Year's Smash (January 2021)	Night 2: Dynamite; January 7, 2021 (aired January 13)	Jacksonville, Florida	Daily's Place	Darby Allin (c) vs. Brian Cage for the AEW TNT Championship	
2	New Year's Smash (December 2021)	Night 1: Dynamite; December 29, 2021	Jacksonville, Florida	Daily's Place	Adam Cole, Bobby Fish, and Kyle O'Reilly vs. Best Friends (Orange Cassidy, Chuck Taylor, and Trent Beretta)	
2	New Year's Smash (December 2021)	Night 2: Rampage; December 29, 2021 (aired December 31)	Jacksonville, Florida	Daily's Place	Cody Rhodes (c) vs. Ethan Page for the AEW TNT Championship	
3	New Year's Smash (2022)	Night 1: Dynamite; December 28, 2022	1stBank Center	Broomfield, Colorado	Samoa Joe (c) vs. Wardlow for the AEW TNT Championship	
3	New Year's Smash (2022)	Night 2: Rampage; December 28, 2022 (aired December 30)	1stBank Center	Broomfield, Colorado	Swerve Strickland vs. Wheeler Yuta	
4	New Year's Smash (2023)	Night 1: Dynamite; December 27, 2023	Addition Financial Arena	Orlando, Florida	MJF (c) vs The Devil's Masked Men (Note: At the time of this match, the identities of both team members were unknown, but they were revealed as Matt Taven and Mike Bennett at Worlds End on December 30.) in a 2-on-1 Handicap match (Note: Samoa Joe was originally scheduled to team with MJF to defend the title in place of an injured Adam Cole, but Joe appeared to have been attacked by The Devil's Masked Men before the match, which was later revealed to have been a ruse as Joe attacked MJF after the match.) for the ROH World Tag Team Championship	
4	New Year's Smash (2023)	Night 2: Rampage; December 27, 2023 (aired December 29)	Addition Financial Arena	Orlando, Florida	Orange Cassidy, Trent Beretta, and Rocky Romero vs. Top Flight (Darius Martin and Dante Martin) and Action Andretti	
5	New Year's Smash (2024)	Rampage; December 22, 2024 (aired December 27)	Hammerstein Ballroom	New York City, New York	Hook vs. Nick Wayne	
6	New Year's Smash (2025)	Dynamite; December 31, 2025	Liberty First Credit Union Arena	Omaha, Nebraska	Mercedes Moné (c) vs. Willow Nightingale for the AEW TBS Championship	
(c) – refers to the champion(s) heading into the match

== See also ==
- List of AEW Dynamite special episodes
- List of AEW Rampage special episodes
- List of All Elite Wrestling pay-per-view events
- List of All Elite Wrestling special events
