= Abadon (wrestler) =

American professional wrestler

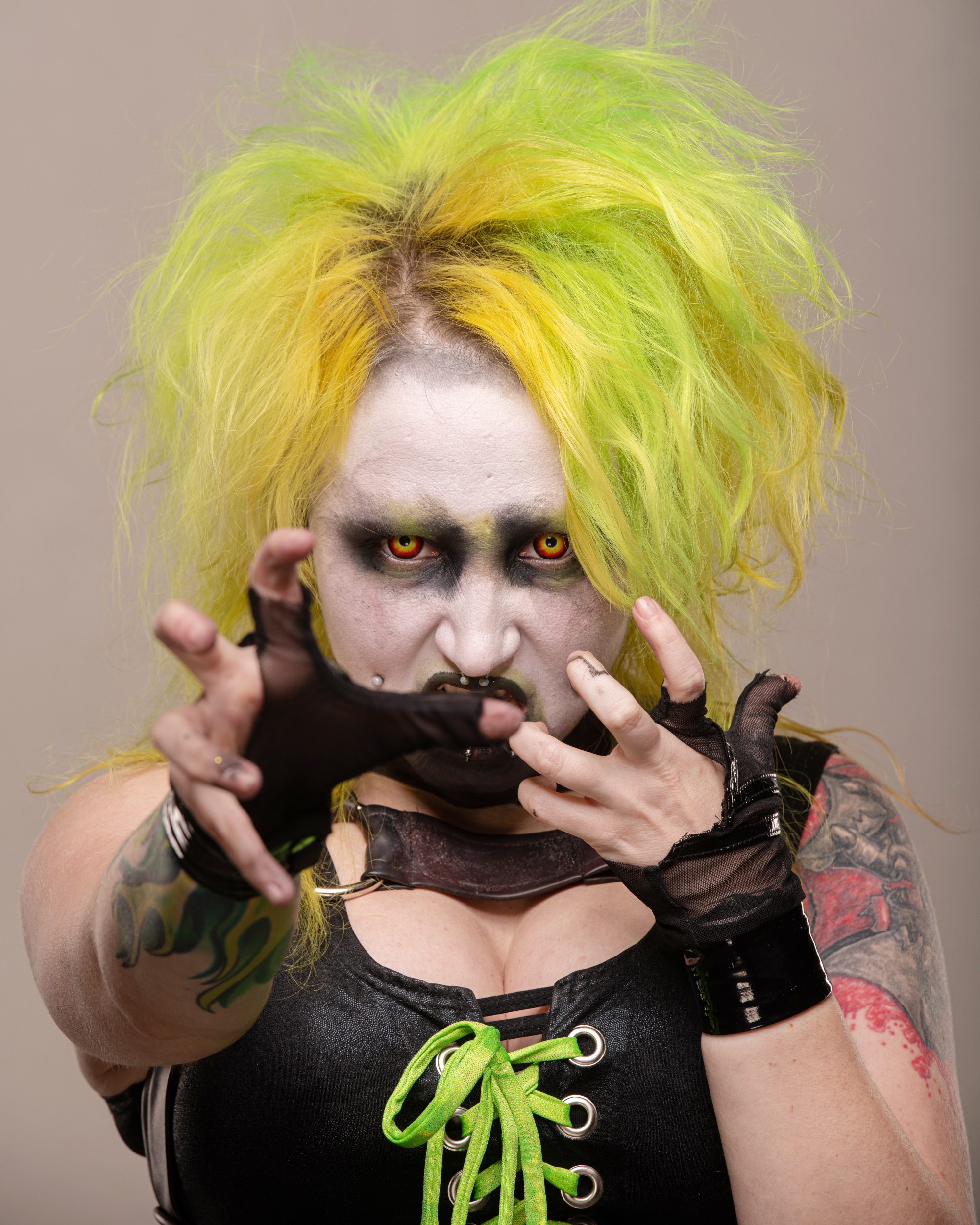
- Abadon in July 2023

Personal information
- Born: Denver, Colorado, U.S.

Professional wrestling career
- Ring name(s): Abadon; Abbidust
- Billed height: 5 ft 0 in (152 cm)
- Billed weight: 136 lb (62 kg) "1000 Lost Souls"
- Billed from: "The Black Hills"
- Trained by: Rocky Mountain Pro Academy
- Debut: January 2019

Abadon is the ring name of an American professional wrestler. They are best known for their time in All Elite Wrestling (AEW) and Ring of Honor (ROH)

== Professional wrestling career ==
=== Early career (2019–2020) ===
Trained by the Rocky Mountain Pro Academy, they made their professional wrestling debut on January 18, 2019, at a Respect Women's Wrestling event, defeating Aria Aurora. They were a regular at Rocky Mountain Pro (RMP), winning the Rocky Mountain Pro Lockettes Championship on two occasions.

=== All Elite Wrestling / Ring of Honor (2020–2025) ===
Abadon made their debut in All Elite Wrestling (AEW) on AEW Dark on March 4, 2020, where they wrestled Hikaru Shida. They made their Dynamite debut on June 17, defeating Anna Jay. After the match, Abadon signed a full time contract. On October 22, they suffered a throat injury during a match with Tay Conti which kept them out of action for a month. On November 25 episode of Dynamite, Abadon returned to AEW, confronting Hikaru Shida, causing Shida to recoil in fear and drop the AEW Women's World Championship belt. The feud continued for several weeks and would conclude on January 7, 2021, at AEW New Years Smash, where Abadon lost a match against Shida for the AEW Women's World Championship. On the October 29 episode of Rampage, Abadon faced the Women's World Champion Dr. Britt Baker, D.M.D. in a non-title Trick or Treat match, where they lost to Baker.

On November 11, 2022, during a match against Joey Ace at a Warriors of Wrestling event, Abadon suffered a broken collarbone. they made their return to AEW on May 17, 2023, in a pre-Dynamite match, where they teamed with Skye Blue and Willow Nightingale to defeat the team of Emi Sakura, Marina Shafir and Nyla Rose. On the October 27, 2023 episode of Rampage, Abadon became the number one contender for the AEW Women's World Championship, after defeating Anna Jay, Skye Blue, and Willow Nightingale in a four-way match; this marked Abadon's first televised appearance in nearly two years. The following night on Collision, Abadon challenged Hikaru Shida for the AEW Women's World Championship in a "Fright Night Fight", but was unsuccessful. At Worlds End in December 2023, Abadon unsuccessfully challenged Julia Hart for the AEW TBS Championship.

In January 2024, Abadon made their Ring of Honor (ROH) debut. On the February 10, 2024, taping of Ring of Honor Wrestling, Abadon entered the inaugural ROH Women's World Television Championship tournament and in the first round was prosperous as they defeated Viva Van to advance in the tournament. During the second round of the tournament, Abadon faced Mercedes Martinez but was not successful. In October 2024, Abadon unsuccessfully challenged ROH Women's World Champion Athena in a Halloween-themed match.

In May 2025, Abadon announced that their AEW contract would be expiring in June and would be not be renewed, ending their five-year tenure with the promotion.

=== Independent circuit (2025–present) ===
After leaving AEW/ROH, Adadon resumed wrestling regularly on the independent circuit. In July 2025, they defeated Amity LaVey to become the inaugural Rising Stars Women's Champion.

In August 2025, they defeated Reiza Clarke for the Metroplex Wrestling Women's Championship. They lost the title in February 2026 to Nikki Blackheart.

== Personal life ==
Abadon is non-binary and uses they/them pronouns.

== Championships and accomplishments ==
- Metroplex Wrestling
  - MPX Women's Championship (1 time)
- Pro Wrestling Illustrated
  - Ranked No. 216 of the top 250 female wrestlers in the PWI Women's 250 in 2025
- Rising Stars Women's Wrestling
  - Rising Stars Women's Championship (1 time)
  - Rising Stars Women's Championship Tournament (2025)
- Rocky Mountain Pro
  - RMP Lockettes Championship (2 times)
- Lucha Libre and Laughs
  - LLL Championship (1 time, current)
