= New Year's Smash (2024) =

All Elite Wrestling television special

- Promotional poster featuring various AEW wrestlers
- Promotion: All Elite Wrestling
- Date: December 22, 2024 (aired December 27, 2024)
- City: New York City, New York
- Venue: Hammerstein Ballroom
- Attendance: 1,491

New Year's Smash chronology
← Previous; 2023	Next → 2025

AEW Rampage special episodes chronology
← Previous; Holiday Bash	Next → Final

The 2024 New Year's Smash was a professional wrestling television special produced by All Elite Wrestling (AEW). It was the fifth annual New Year's Smash and took place on December 22, 2024, at the Hammerstein Ballroom in New York City, New York, and aired on tape delay on December 27 as a special New Year's-themed episode of Friday Night Rampage on TNT in the United States. This was a change from previous events which were broadcast in two parts and included Wednesday Night Dynamite. The special was notably the final episode of Rampage due to the program's cancellation.

== Production ==
=== Background ===
New Year's Smash is a professional wrestling television special held around New Year's by All Elite Wrestling (AEW) since January 2021. While the prior New Year's Smash events aired in two parts, with the previous three specifically airing as a special episode of Wednesday Night Dynamite and then as a special episode of Friday Night Rampage, the 2024 event only aired as a special episode of Rampage as that week's Dynamite aired as a Christmas special called Dynamite on 34th Street. The event was held on December 22, 2024, at the Hammerstein Ballroom in New York City, New York and aired on tape delay on December 27 on TNT. This was also notably the final episode of Rampage as the program was not included in AEW's media rights deal with Warner Bros. Discovery that took effect on January 1, 2025.

=== Storylines ===
New Year's Smash featured professional wrestling matches that involved different wrestlers from pre-existing scripted feuds and storylines. Storylines were produced on AEW's weekly television programs, Dynamite, Rampage, and Collision.

== Results ==
No.	Results	Stipulations	Times
1	Chris Jericho (with Big Bill) defeated Anthony Bowens (with Max Caster) by pinfall	Singles match	9:39
2	Private Party (Isiah Kassidy and Marq Quen) defeated Leo Sparrow and Alec Quest by pinfall	Tag team match	1:03
3	Thunder Rosa defeated Leila Grey by submission	Singles match	7:58
4	Hook defeated Nick Wayne (with Christian Cage, Mother Wayne, and Kip Sabian) by technical submission	Singles match	12:29
