= New Year's Smash (December 2021) =

All Elite Wrestling two-part television special

AEW New Year's Smash
- Promotional poster featuring Bryan Danielson, Ruby Soho, Adam Cole, and CM Punk (clockwise from left)
- Promotion: All Elite Wrestling
- Date: December 29, 2021 (aired December 29 and 31, 2021)
- City: Jacksonville, Florida
- Venue: Daily's Place
- Attendance: 3,542

New Year's Smash chronology
← Previous; January 2021	Next → 2022

AEW Dynamite special episodes chronology
← Previous; Holiday Bash	Next → Beach Break

AEW Rampage special episodes chronology
← Previous; Holiday Bash	Next → Beach Break

The December 2021 New Year's Smash was the second New Year's Smash professional wrestling television special produced by All Elite Wrestling (AEW). It took place on December 29, 2021, at Daily's Place in Jacksonville, Florida. The two-part event was broadcast on TNT as special episodes of AEW's weekly television programs, Wednesday Night Dynamite and Friday Night Rampage. Dynamite aired live while Rampage aired on tape delay on December 31. It was the second New Year's Smash event to be held in 2021, after the first took place in January. The Dynamite broadcast was the show's final episode on TNT as Dynamite moved to TNT's sister channel TBS on January 5, 2022.

In the main event of the Dynamite broadcast, the reunited team of Adam Cole and reDRagon (Bobby Fish and Kyle O'Reilly) defeated Best Friends (Chuck Taylor, Trent? Beretta, and Orange Cassidy), while in the main event of the Rampage broadcast, Cody Rhodes defeated Ethan Page to retain the AEW TNT Championship. The Dynamite broadcast also saw the AEW debut of Mercedes Martinez, who cost Thunder Rosa her semifinals match against Jade Cargill in the AEW TBS Championship tournament. Martinez last appeared in AEW as a free agent at the All Out pay-per-view and an episode of Dark in late 2019.

== Production ==
=== Background ===
In January 2021, All Elite Wrestling (AEW) held a two-part television special of Wednesday Night Dynamite called New Year's Smash. On November 8, 2021, AEW President Tony Khan confirmed that New Year's Smash would return live on December 29 for Dynamite and an episode of Friday Night Rampage that would air on tape delay on New Year's Eve. The December 29 episode marked the final episode of Dynamite on TNT; the show moved to TBS on January 5, 2022, while Rampage remained on TNT. This was part of AEW's end-of-year Christmas party. The event returned AEW to its home venue of Daily's Place in Jacksonville, Florida.

=== Storylines ===
New Year's Smash featured professional wrestling matches that involved different wrestlers from pre-existing scripted feuds and storylines. Wrestlers portrayed heroes, villains, or less distinguishable characters in scripted events that built tension and culminated in a wrestling match or series of matches. Storylines were produced on AEW's weekly television programs, Dynamite and Rampage, the supplementary online streaming shows, Dark and Elevation, and The Young Bucks' YouTube series Being The Elite.

== Results ==
Dynamite - (December 29) - (Part 1)
No.	Results	Stipulations	Times
1	Matt Hardy, Private Party (Isiah Kassidy and Marq Quen), and FTR (Cash Wheeler and Dax Harwood) (with Tully Blanchard) defeated Christian Cage, Jurassic Express (Jungle Boy and Luchasaurus), and The Lucha Brothers (Penta El Zero Miedo and Rey Fénix) (with Alex Abrahantes) by pinfall	Ten-man tag team match	12:52
2	2.0 (Jeff Parker and Matt Lee) and Daniel Garcia defeated Eddie Kingston, Santana and Ortiz by pinfall	Six-man tag team match	8:33
3	Wardlow (with Shawn Spears) defeated Colin Delaney by pinfall	Singles match	1:23
4	Jade Cargill (with Mark Sterling) defeated Thunder Rosa by pinfall	AEW TBS Championship tournament semifinal	11:00
5	Adam Cole and reDRagon (Bobby Fish and Kyle O'Reilly) defeated Best Friends (Chuck Taylor, Trent Beretta, and Orange Cassidy) by pinfall	Six-man tag team match	14:50

Rampage - (December 31) - (Part 2)
No.	Results	Stipulations	Times
1	Darby Allin (with Sting) defeated Anthony Bowens (with Max Caster)	Singles match	11:03
2	TayJay (Anna Jay and Tay Conti) defeated Penelope Ford and The Bunny	Tag team Street Fight	10:42
3	Cody Rhodes (c) (with Arn Anderson) defeated Ethan Page (with Dan Lambert and Scorpio Sky)	Singles match for the AEW TNT Championship	14:13
(c) / – the champion(s) heading into the match
