= New Year's Smash (2023) =

All Elite Wrestling two-part television special

- Promotional poster for the Dynamite broadcast
- Promotion: All Elite Wrestling
- Date: December 27, 2023 (aired December 27 and 29, 2023)
- City: Orlando, Florida
- Venue: Addition Financial Arena
- Attendance: 5,729

New Year's Smash chronology
← Previous; 2022	Next → 2024

AEW Dynamite special episodes chronology
← Previous; Holiday Bash	Next → Homecoming

AEW Rampage special episodes chronology
← Previous; Holiday Bash	Next → Homecoming

The 2023 New Year's Smash was the fourth New Year's Smash professional wrestling television special produced by All Elite Wrestling (AEW). The two-part event took place on December 27, 2023, at the Addition Financial Arena in Orlando, Florida, encompassing AEW's weekly television programs, Wednesday Night Dynamite and Friday Night Rampage. Dynamite aired live on TBS while Rampage aired on tape delay on December 29 on TNT.

Seven matches were contested at the event, four of which aired live on Dynamite with the other three taped for Rampage. In the main event of the Dynamite broadcast, The Devil's Masked Men (Matt Taven and Mike Bennett, who at the time were unidentified) defeated MJF in a 2-on-1 Handicap match to win the ROH World Tag Team Championship for the third time. In the main event of the Rampage broadcast, Top Flight (Darius Martin and Dante Martin) and Action Andretti defeated Orange Cassidy, Trent Beretta, and Rocky Romero in a trios match.

== Production ==
=== Background ===
New Year's Smash is a two-part professional wrestling television special held around New Year's by All Elite Wrestling (AEW) since January 2021. The fourth New Year's Smash was scheduled to be held on December 27, 2023, at the Addition Financial Arena in Orlando, Florida. The first part aired live as a special episode of Wednesday Night Dynamite on TBS, while the second part was taped the same night and aired on tape delay on December 29 as a special episode of Friday Night Rampage on TNT.

=== Storylines ===
New Year's Smash featured professional wrestling matches that involved different wrestlers from pre-existing scripted feuds and storylines, written by AEW's writers. Storylines were produced on AEW's weekly television programs, Dynamite, Rampage, and Collision.

On the November 11 episode of Collision, AEW president Tony Khan announced the Continental Classic, a 12-man round-robin tournament similar to New Japan Pro-Wrestling's (NJPW) G1 Climax, to be held across episodes of Dynamite, Rampage, and Collision, starting from the November 22 episode of Dynamite. The semi-finals, promoted as the League Finals, were scheduled for Dynamite: New Year's Smash. As a result of Jay White's win over Jon Moxley on Dynamite: Holiday Bash, that tied him in points with Moxley and Swerve Strickland, with the three facing off in a three-way match in the Gold League Final. Additionally, due to Bryan Danielson and Claudio Castagnoli's time limit draw on Collision: Holiday Bash, that kept Danielson ahead in points to face Eddie Kingston in the Blue League Final.

== Results ==
=== Night 1 ===
Dynamite (aired live December 27)
No.	Results	Stipulations	Times
1	Jon Moxley defeated Jay White and Swerve Strickland by pinfall	AEW Continental Classic Gold League Semifinal match	23:15
2	Eddie Kingston defeated Bryan Danielson by pinfall	AEW Continental Classic Blue League Semifinal match	22:35
3	Skye Blue defeated Kris Statlander by pinfall	Singles match	9:15
4	The Devil's Masked Men (Note: At the time of this match, the identities of the team members were unknown, but they were revealed as Matt Taven and Mike Bennett at Worlds End on December 30.) defeated MJF (c) by pinfall	2-on-1 Handicap match (Note: Samoa Joe was originally scheduled to team with MJF to defend the title in place of an injured Adam Cole, but Joe appeared to have been attacked by The Devil's Masked Men before the match, which was later revealed to have been a ruse as Joe attacked MJF after the match.) for the ROH World Tag Team Championship	1:25
(c) / – the champion(s) heading into the match

=== Night 2 ===
Rampage (taped December 27; aired December 29)
No.	Results	Stipulations	Times
1	Ruby Soho (with Saraya and Harley Cameron) defeated Marina Shafir (with Nyla Rose) by pinfall	Singles match	5:00
2	Wheeler Yuta (c) defeated Matt Sydal by pinfall	Pure Wrestling Rules match for the ROH Pure Championship	9:34
3	Top Flight (Darius Martin and Dante Martin) and Action Andretti defeated Orange Cassidy, Trent Beretta, and Rocky Romero by pinfall	Trios match	13:00
(c) / – the champion(s) heading into the match
