= The Dark Order =

Professional wrestling stable

- The Dark Order old logo

Stable
- Members: See below
- Name: The Dark Order
- Billed from: The Keep
- Debut: May 25, 2019
- Years active: 2019–present

The Dark Order is a professional wrestling stable signed to All Elite Wrestling (AEW). The stable consists of Evil Uno, John Silver, Alex Reynolds, Brodie Lee Jr, and Preston Vance. The stable previously utilized masked henchmen dubbed "creepers" who, when the group was being portrayed as villains, would join them in beatdowns and other disruptive acts as well as an unnamed spokesman who would be more formally dressed and did not participate in any in-ring activities.

The group debuted with Uno and Stu Grayson as its first members in May 2019, during the inaugural Double or Nothing pay-per-view. In March 2020, Mr. Brodie Lee made his AEW debut and was revealed as the leader (and "exalted one") of the stable. Several wrestlers were added to the group during this period, and Lee would ultimately win the TNT Championship in August 2020. However, when he died four months later, AEW hosted the Brodie Lee Celebration of Life; this saw the group turn into heroic characters and name Lee's eight-year-old son their honorary new leader.

== Background ==
Uno and Grayson previously teamed together as the Super Smash Brothers and were known primarily for their work in Chikara and Pro Wrestling Guerrilla (PWG). Reynolds and Silver previously teamed together as the Beaver Boys, and were known for their work in Combat Zone Wrestling (CZW). Both tag teams were one-time PWG World Tag Team Champions.

Uno and Grayson were first shown at the end of a Being The Elite episode, when The Young Bucks teased the signing of the Super Smash Brothers.

== Professional wrestling career ==
=== All Elite Wrestling (2019–present) ===
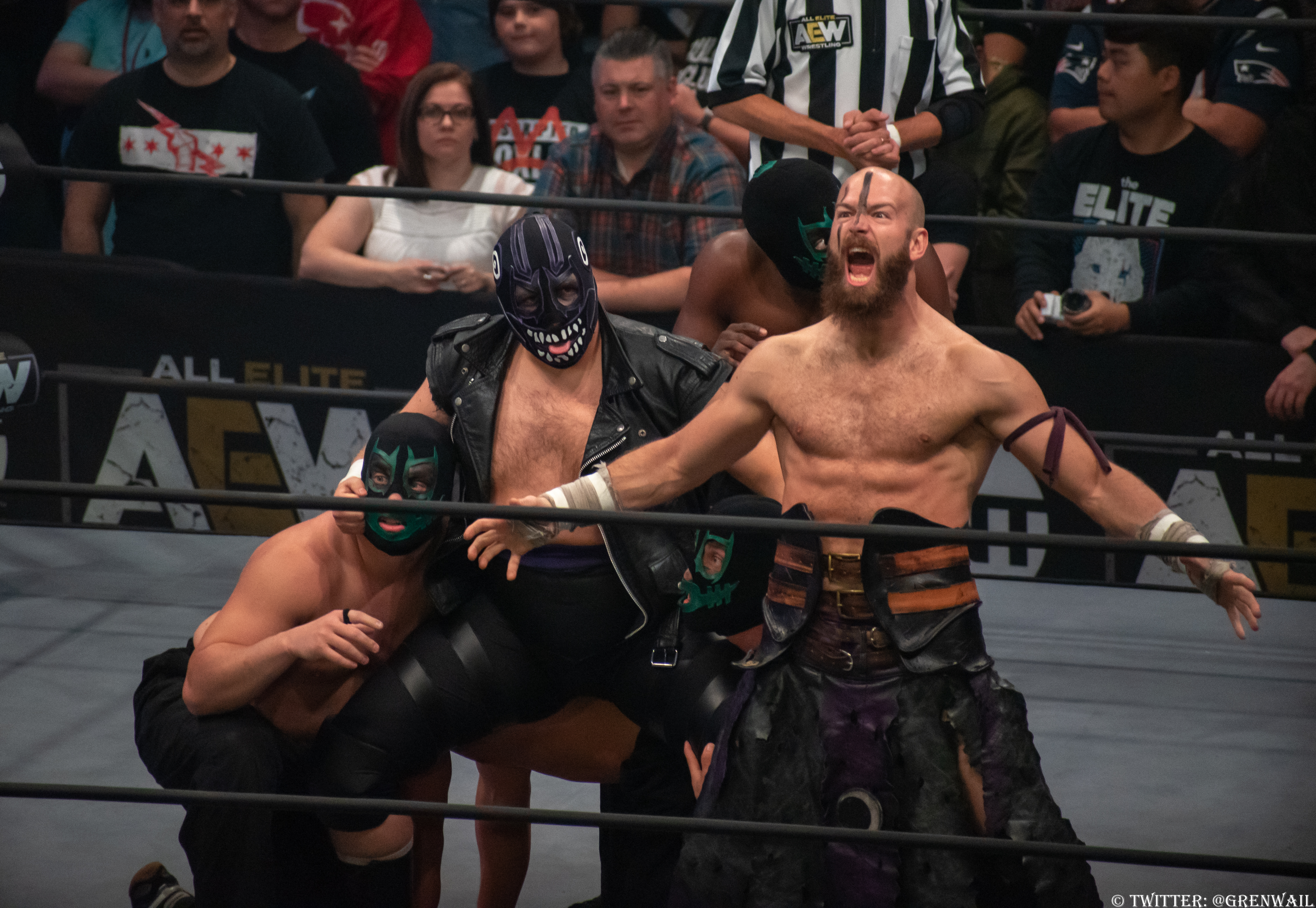
Uno (left) and Greyson (right) with unnamed members (middle and behind Greyson) of the Dark Order in October 2019

On May 25, 2019, at Double or Nothing, Uno and Grayson were repackaged and made their surprise debut as The Dark Order. After Best Friends (Chuck Taylor and Trent) defeated Angélico and Jack Evans, Uno and Grayson appeared ringside after the lights went out, and attacked everyone alongside their masked henchmen (referred to as "creepers"). On July 13, at Fight for the Fallen, they made their AEW in-ring debut in a three-way tag team match defeating Angélico, Evans and Jurassic Express (Jungle Boy and Luchasaurus), advancing to All Out for an opportunity at a first round bye in the AEW World Tag Team Championship tournament. On August 31, at All Out, they defeated Best Friends to receive a first round buy-in for the AEW World Tag Team Championship tournament. They were unsuccessful in the tournament, losing to eventual winners SoCal Uncensored on the October 23 episode of Dynamite.

On November 20, the first of a series of Dark Order vignettes began airing, and in doing so, introduced the spokesman for the stable, who communicated to Alex Reynolds through a hotel television. Then, John Silver and Alex Reynolds joined the Dark Order. On the January 1, 2020, episode of Dynamite, "The Exalted One" was revealed as the title of the Dark Order's mysterious off-screen leader.

The stable's first feud was with SoCal Uncensored, and saw the Order try to recruit Christopher Daniels following his loss to Sammy Guevara. During the following weeks, The Dark Order faced SoCal Uncensored including a victory at Revolution, where Uno and Grayson defeated Kazarian and Scorpio Sky in a tag team match. On the March 18, 2020, episode of Dynamite, Mr. Brodie Lee made his AEW debut and was revealed as The Exalted One and the leader of The Dark Order, beating up Daniels and Kazarian. Then, Lee would have several squashes against other wrestlers. Also, on the April 22, 2020, episode of Dynamite, Preston Vance joined the stable as 10. On June 5, it was revealed that Alan Angels had been recruited as a new member of the Dark Order under the moniker of 5. He would later debut on the June 9, 2020, episode of AEW Dark.

In May, Colt Cabana began a losing streak as Brodie Lee tried to recruit him into The Dark Order. On the June 10 episode of Dynamite, after Cabana lost to Sammy Guevara, Lee came out to help Cabana to his feet and once again offer him a spot in the Dark Order. Later on in the night, Cabana was seen heading into Lee's office. The following week, Cabana was handed an envelope by Lee that stated they will team together against Joey Janela and Sonny Kiss. At the same time, Brodie Lee extended a hand to Anna Jay after her loss to Abadon. Cabana and Lee would defeat Janela and Kiss after Cabana got the pin on Janela. Over the next few weeks, Cabana would begin a winning streak teaming with members of the Dark Order as he was slowly recruited into the group over time. Anna Jay would later make her first appearance alongside the Dark Order on the July 29 episode of Dynamite. On the August 22 edition of Dynamite, Brodie Lee defeated Cody for the AEW TNT Championship and later gave him back the shattered pieces of the prototype TNT title. On the following episode of Dynamite, after a victory celebration, the Dark Order extended an invitation to Tay Conti to join the group. At All Out on September 5, Lee, Cabana, Evil Uno and Grayson were defeated by Matt Cardona, Scorpio Sky, Dustin Rhodes and Q. T. Marshall in an eight-man tag team match. Lee lost the TNT Championship back to Cody on the October 7 episode of Dynamite. The Dark Order would then more heavily pursue the recruitment of Hangman Page, whom they had made advances towards previously.

In the days prior to Brodie Lee's death on December 26, 2020, his older son, Brodie Jr., nicknamed "Negative 1", was signed to All Elite Wrestling and became a member of his father's faction at the age of 8, with AEW stating that he can start to perform for the company when he becomes an adult if he so wishes. The December 30 episode of AEW Dynamite, known as the "Brodie Lee Celebration of Life", featured Dark Order members winning every match. Following this, Dark Order transitioned into babyfaces as they continued their storyline involving Hangman Page where Silver and Reynolds teamed with Page on several occasions while also still trying to recruit him into the group. However, on the January 20, 2021, episode of Dynamite, Page would politely rebuff their offer, as he felt that he did not work well in groups. At the Revolution event on March 7, Page defeated Matt Hardy; the Dark Order subsequently came down to the ring to celebrate with him. At Fight for the Fallen, Page teamed with the Dark Order to face Omega, the Young Bucks and The Good Brothers (Doc Gallows and Karl Anderson) in a 10-man tag team elimination match, where if Page and the Dark Order won, they would receive matches for the world and tag team championships, respectively. Page and the Dark Order were defeated, with Page being the last man eliminated on his team.

Evil Uno and Alex Reynolds in August 2026.

On the June 15, 2023, episode of ROH TV, where The Dark Order had been appearing most frequently in 2023, John Silver confirmed that Stu Grayson had left the group and joined a rival faction, The Righteous with Vinny Marseglia. On the August 6, 2026 episode of ROH Wrestling, Preston Vance was kicked out of the Frat House and was saved by The Dark Order, rejoining the group and turning face

=== Independent circuit (2019) ===
Following Double or Nothing, Uno and Grayson were booked for some independent shows, usually against AEW contracted wrestlers, before the premiere of AEW Dynamite in October 2019. This began at Pro Wrestling Guerilla's Sixteen, on July 26, marking their first appearance in the company since 2013, when they were known as the Super Smash Brothers. They defeated Best Friends (Chuck Taylor and Trent) by disqualification, when Trent hit a low blow in retaliation for the Dark Order doing the same when the referee was down. On August 7, at an Oriental Wrestling Entertainment (OWE) show in Toronto, they defeated Strong Hearts (El Lindaman and T-Hawk). The next day, they appeared at a Progress Wrestling show in the same city, but were defeated by Aussie Open (Kyle Fletcher and Mark Davis), in a three-way match, also involving The Butcher and The Blade (Andy Williams and Pepper Parks).

== Professional wrestling character ==
Stu Grayson described The Dark Order as a Scientology-like cult. As part of the gimmick, the stable has tried to recruit people from outside of professional wrestling. The stable also has a website, joindarkorder.com. During the early days of the stable, Dark Order received a bad reception after a "cold debut" and a "disastrous main-event angle that saw one of The Dark Order's "minions" go viral for throwing blatantly fake punches." Evil Uno and Stu Grayson agreed that the incident hurt their image until Brodie Lee was revealed as the leader of the faction.

== Members ==
*	Founding member(s)
L	Leader(s)

=== Current ===
Member	Number	Portrait	Tenure	Ref
Evil Uno	1		May 25, 2019 – present	
Alex Reynolds	3		December 18, 2019 – present	
John Silver	4		December 18, 2019 – present	
Preston Vance	10		April 22, 2020 – November 23, 2022; August 6, 2026 – present	
Brodie Lee Jr. (L)	-1		December 22, 2020 – present (Note: Mr. Brodie Lee's elder son was made a member before Lee died.)	

=== Former ===
Member		Tenure
Mr. Brodie Lee	L	March 18, 2020 – October 7, 2020 (Note: Lee died in December 2020. This appearance, as leader of the stable, was his last on AEW.)
Alan Angels	5	June 9, 2020 (Note: In December 2021, it was revealed that "8," who debuted on April 1, 2020, was portrayed by Angels; June 9 represents his first appearance as "5"/himself.) – June 29, 2022
Colt Cabana	8	June 24, 2020 (Note: Cabana never explicitly announced his membership into the group and was recruited slowly over time. This date indicates his first time teaming with another member of The Dark Order.) – March 15, 2022 (Note: Colt Cabana never officially left the stable. This date reflects his last appearance alongside other members of the Dark Order.)
Anna Jay	99	July 7, 2020 – July 20, 2022
Stu Grayson	2	May 25, 2019 – May 2, 2022 (Note: Stu Grayson never officially left the stable. This date reflects the day it was announced his contract had expired with AEW. He would later make a one night appearance on the October 14, 2022, episode of Rampage.), October 15, 2022, March 15, 2023 (Note: After making another appearance on the March 15, 2023, episode of Dynamite, it was announced that Stu Grayson would be returning to AEW full time.) - June 15, 2023
"Creepers" (Note: While working as heels, an army of unnamed masked thugs are used in beatdowns and are frequently referred to by the commentators as "Creepers".)		August 1, 2019 - August 27, 2020 (Note: This member never officially left the stable. The date represents their final appearance as a member.)
Unnamed Spokesman		November 20, 2019 - June 3, 2020
	8 (Note: In December 2021, "8" was revealed to have been portrayed by Alan Angels, otherwise known as "5.")	April 1, 2020
	9 (Note: In an interview on Talk is Jericho released on September 9, 2022, Alan Angels confirmed that "9" was portrayed by Preston Vance on April 1, 2020. In July 2021, "9" was revealed to have been portrayed by Brandon Cutler for his second appearance on August 5, 2020.)	April 1, 2020; August 5, 2020

== Sub-groups ==
Affiliate	Members	Tenure	Type
Silver and Reynolds	Alex Reynolds; John Silver	2019–present	Tag team

=== Former ===
Affiliate	Members	Tenure	Type
TayJay	Tay Melo; Anna Jay	2020–2022	Tag team

Affiliate	Members	Tenure	Type
Uno and Grayson	Evil Uno; Stu Grayson	2019–2022, 2023	Tag team

== Championships and accomplishments ==
- All Elite Wrestling
  - AEW TNT Championship (1 time) – Lee
  - AEW Dynamite Awards (1 time)
    - Biggest WTF Moment (2022) – Jay and Conti – vs. The Bunny and Penelope Ford in a Street Fight on New's Year Smash (December 31)
- Pro Wrestling Illustrated
  - Ranked Cabana No. 115 of the top 500 singles wrestlers in the PWI 500 in 2020
  - Ranked Vance No. 158 of the top 500 singles wrestlers in the PWI 500 in 2021
  - Ranked Uno No. 188 of the top 500 singles wrestlers in the PWI 500 in 2021
  - Ranked Grayson No. 191 of the top 500 singles wrestlers in the PWI 500 in 2021
  - Ranked Silver No. 247 of the top 500 singles wrestlers in the PWI 500 in 2021
  - Ranked Reynolds No. 312 of the top 500 singles wrestlers in the PWI 500 in 2020
  - Ranked Angels No. 351 of the top 500 singles wrestlers in the PWI 500 in 2021
