= 1stBank Center =

Event arena in Broomfield, Colorado, USA

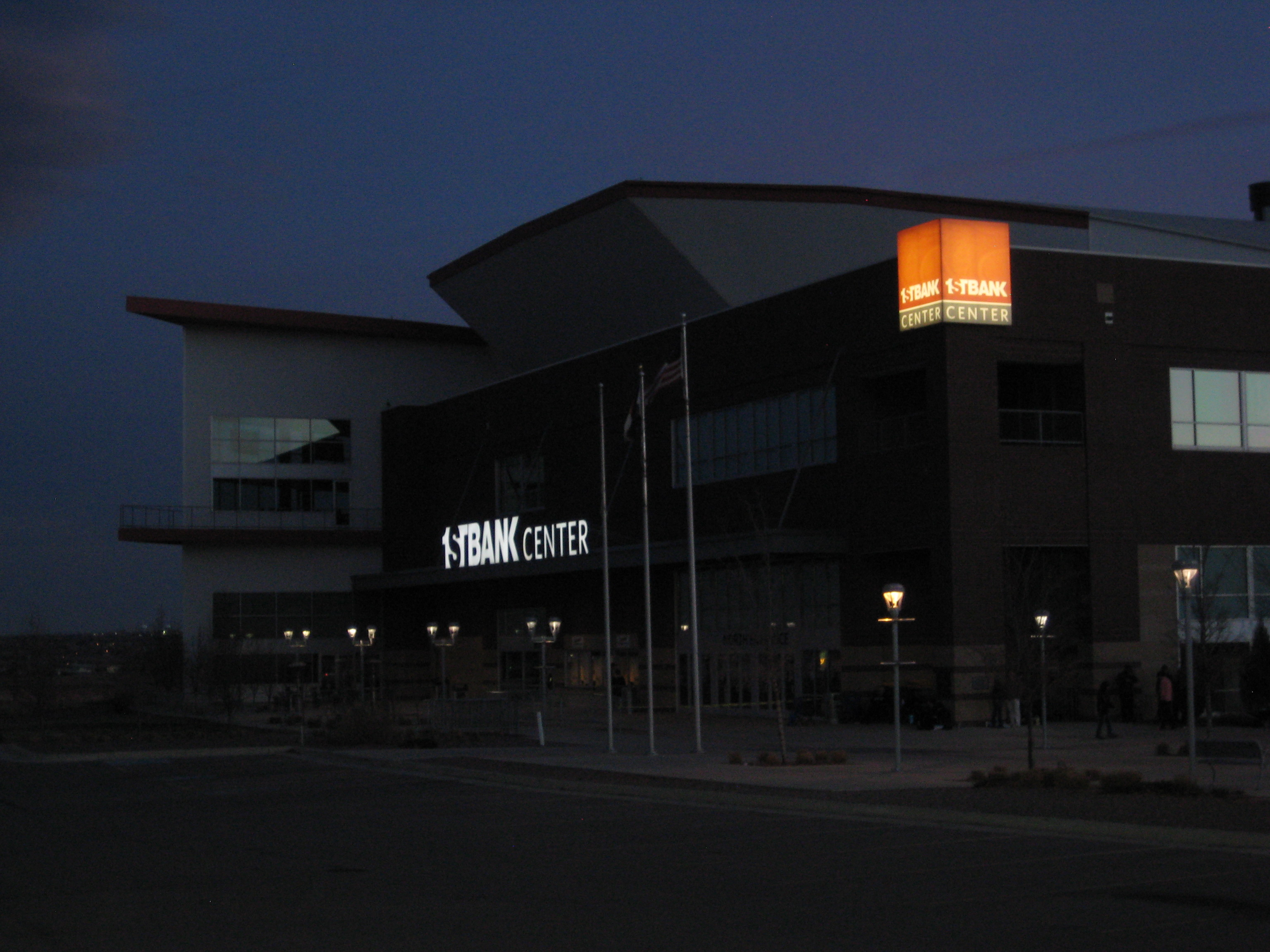
- 1stBank Center as seen in 2012

- Location in Colorado Location in the United States Location in North America
- Interactive map of 1stBank Center
- Former names: Broomfield Event Center (2006–2009); Odeum Colorado (2009–2010)
- Address: 11450 Broomfield Lane
- Location: Broomfield, Colorado, U.S.
- Coordinates: 39.904527°N 105.085334°W
- Owner: Broomfield Urban Renewal Authority
- Operator: Peak Entertainment
- Capacity: 6,500

Construction
- Groundbreaking: October 18, 2005; 21 years ago
- Opened: November 9, 2006; 20 years ago
- Renovated: 2009–10
- Closed: September 27, 2023; 3 years ago
- Demolished: November 2024–2025
- Cost: US$45 million ($74.2 million in 2025 dollars)
- Architect: Sink Combs Dethlefs
- Project manager: International Coliseums Company
- Structural engineers: Martin & Martin Consulting Engineers
- Services engineer: ME Engineers
- General contractors: Sanders Construction, Inc

Tenants
- Rocky Mountain Rage (CHL) (2006–2009); Colorado 14ers (NBA D-League) (2006–2009); Denver Roller Dolls (WFTDA) (2010–2023)

Website
- Venue Website

The 1stBank Center (originally the Broomfield Event Center and formerly the Odeum Colorado) was a multi-purpose arena located 15 miles northwest of Downtown Denver, in the city of Broomfield. It was located near the Rocky Mountain Metropolitan Airport and the Flatiron Crossing Mall. Opening in 2006, the arena naming rights belonged to 1stBank, a local financial institution since 2010. The venue was typically used for mid-sized concerts in the Denver Metro area, seating up to 6,500 patrons. From June 2010 until May 2014, the arena housed the Colorado Music Hall of Fame before it moved to its permanent home at the Red Rocks Amphitheatre. For sports, it was the home of the Denver Roller Dolls and former home of the Rocky Mountain Rage and Colorado 14ers. The arena closed in 2023 and was demolished the following year.

== History ==
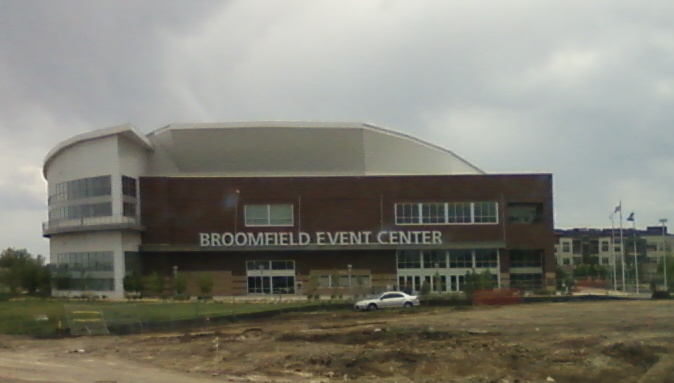
Exterior of arena during construction, May 2009

The City and County of Broomfield unveiled plans for a new sports facility in the Denver Metro area, in May 2005. Led by Tim Wiens and John Frew, the venue was an anchor for the 215-acre commercial and residential development, Arista Metropolitan District (also called Arista Broomfield). The facility served as competition for several mid-sized venues in Colorado, including the: Magness Arena, Bellco Theatre, Fillmore Auditorium, Budweiser Events Center, World Arena and the (now defunct) City Lights Pavilion. To set it apart from its competition, the arena was designed to give an arena-sized show a theater (intimate) feeling.

Construction began in October 2005 to a rocky start. Six months after construction began, the venue's owners faced a lawsuit regarding noise control. Before opening, the facility saw staff and management changes. Despite pushbacks, the venue opened on November 9, 2006, with a concert by Bonnie Raitt. However, the facility proved it couldn't stand against its competitors. Many patrons complained of a lack of parking and street signs leading to the venue. Others complained about the acoustics, describing the arena as a concrete barn. For its first two years of operation, the venue did not see a profit. It was unable to pay bills and staff salaries.

Until 2009, the arena was operated by Broomfield Sports and Entertainment (created by Wiens and Frew). Management ceased when the company could no longer financially afford to maintain the failing venue. The Broomfield Urban Renewal Authority (BURA) began seeking a new management company in January 2009. AEG Live, VenuWorks and SMG all placed bids. Operations were passed off to Peak Entertainment—a joint venture between Kroenke Sports Enterprises and AEG Live Rocky Mountains, in June 2009, for 28 years. Chuck Morris, President and CEO of AEG Live Rocky Mountains, was responsible to the revitalization of the Fillmore Auditorium.

Under the new management, the venue saw over one million dollars in renovations. This included a new paint job, window treatments, terrace balconies, improvements to lighting and acoustics. Over 2,000 parking spaces were added, along with a pedestrian bridge connecting patrons to RTD's US 36 and Broomfield Park-n-Ride. During this construction period, the facility was given a temporary name change of Odeum Colorado. In February 2010, it was announced local financial institution, FirstBank Holding Company of Colorado, Inc. (known simply as 1stBank) purchased naming rights for five years, at an undisclosed amount. The agreement began on March 1, 2010. The arena reopened on March 5, 2010, with a concert by Furthur. Since its reopening, the arena has hosted numerous concerts by popular artists, alongside family shows and sporting events.

On May 23, 2023, the Broomfield Urban Renewal Authority's Board of Directors announced that the arena would permanently close on November 30 and then be torn down in early to mid 2024. The board cited that the arena never made a profit as the reason for its closing. The large property is expected to be redeveloped soon after demolition of the 1st Bank Center. Demolition began in November 2024. The demolition of the building cost $3 million. As of May 2025, the site where the arena once stood was a dirt lot.

The 1st Bank Center held its final event on September 27, 2023, with an episode of AEW Dynamite.

== Naming history ==
- Broomfield Event Center (November 9, 2006—December 8, 2009)
- Odeum Colorado (December 9, 2009—February 28, 2010) (no events were held during the time as the arena was being renovated)
- 1stBank Center (March 1, 2010—September 27, 2023)

== Special events ==
- UFC Fight Night: Florian vs. Lauzon (April 2, 2008)
- Strikeforce: Payback (October 3, 2008)
- UFC Live: Vera vs. Jones (March 21, 2010)
- WEC 51: Aldo vs. Gamburyan (September 30, 2010)
- UFC Fight Night: Henderson vs. Thatch (February 14, 2015)
- Glory 16: Denver (May 3, 2014)
- Glory 34: Denver (October 21, 2016)
- Glory 56: Denver (August 10, 2018)
- AEW Dynamite (March 4, 2020)
- New Year's Smash (2022) (December 28, 2022)
- BKFC 41 (April 29, 2023)
- ONE on Prime Video 10 (May 5, 2023)
- AEW Dynamite (September 27, 2023)
