= Penelope Ford =

American professional wrestler (born 1992)

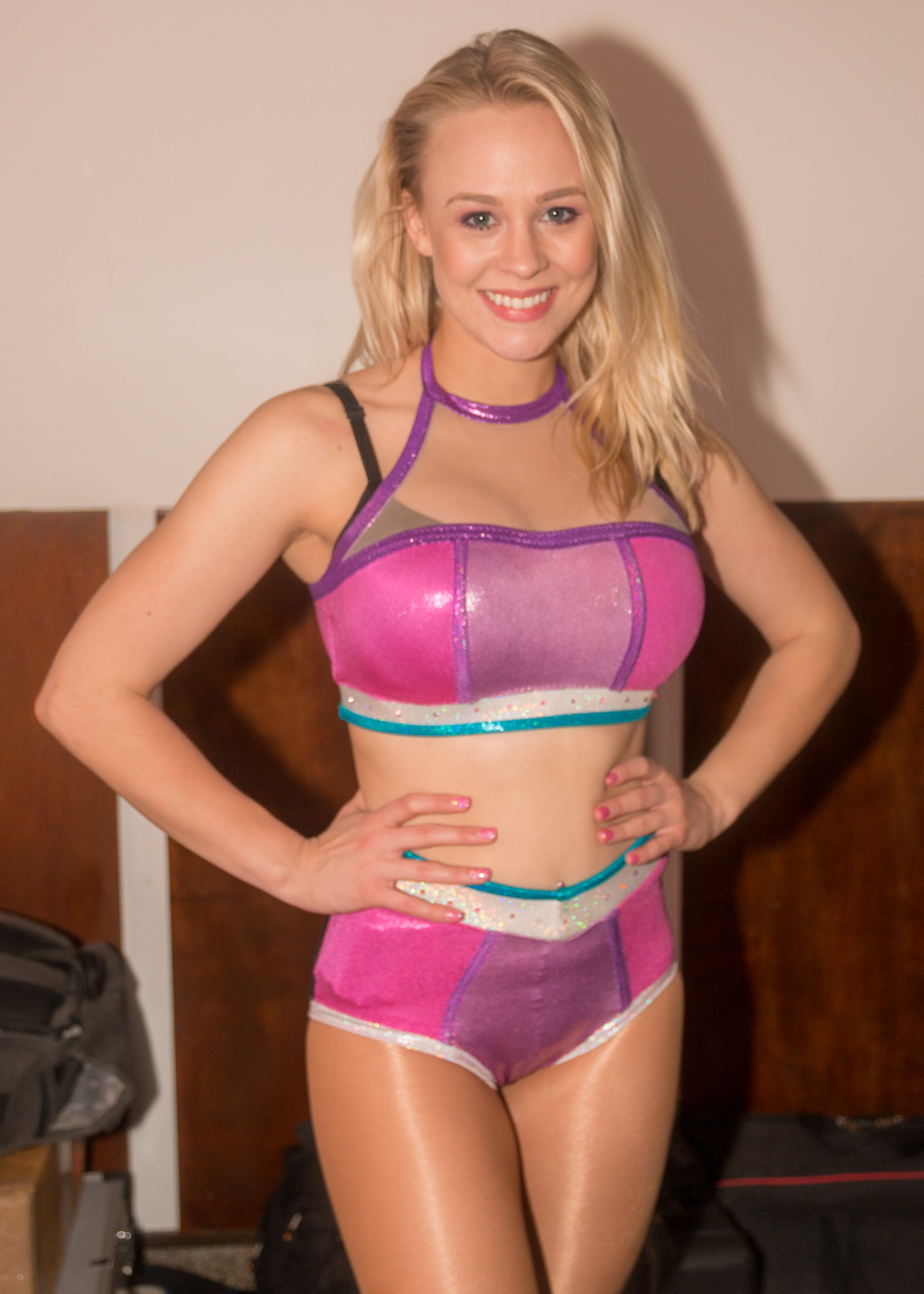
- Ford in 2017

Personal information
- Born: Olivia Hasler; September 14, 1992 (age 33) Philadelphia, Pennsylvania, U.S.
- Spouse: Kip Sabian (m. 2021)

Professional wrestling career
- Ring name: Penelope Ford
- Billed height: 5 ft 4 in (163 cm)
- Billed weight: 119 lb (54 kg)
- Billed from: Philadelphia, Pennsylvania
- Trained by: D. J. Hyde; Drew Gulak; Finneus James; Rory Gulak
- Debut: December 17, 2014

Olivia Kippen (née Hasler; born September 14, 1992) is an American professional wrestler better known by the ring name Penelope Ford. She is signed to All Elite Wrestling (AEW), where she is one-half of MegaBad with Megan Bayne. She is also known for her work in Combat Zone Wrestling.

== Professional wrestling career ==
=== Combat Zone Wrestling (2014–2018) ===
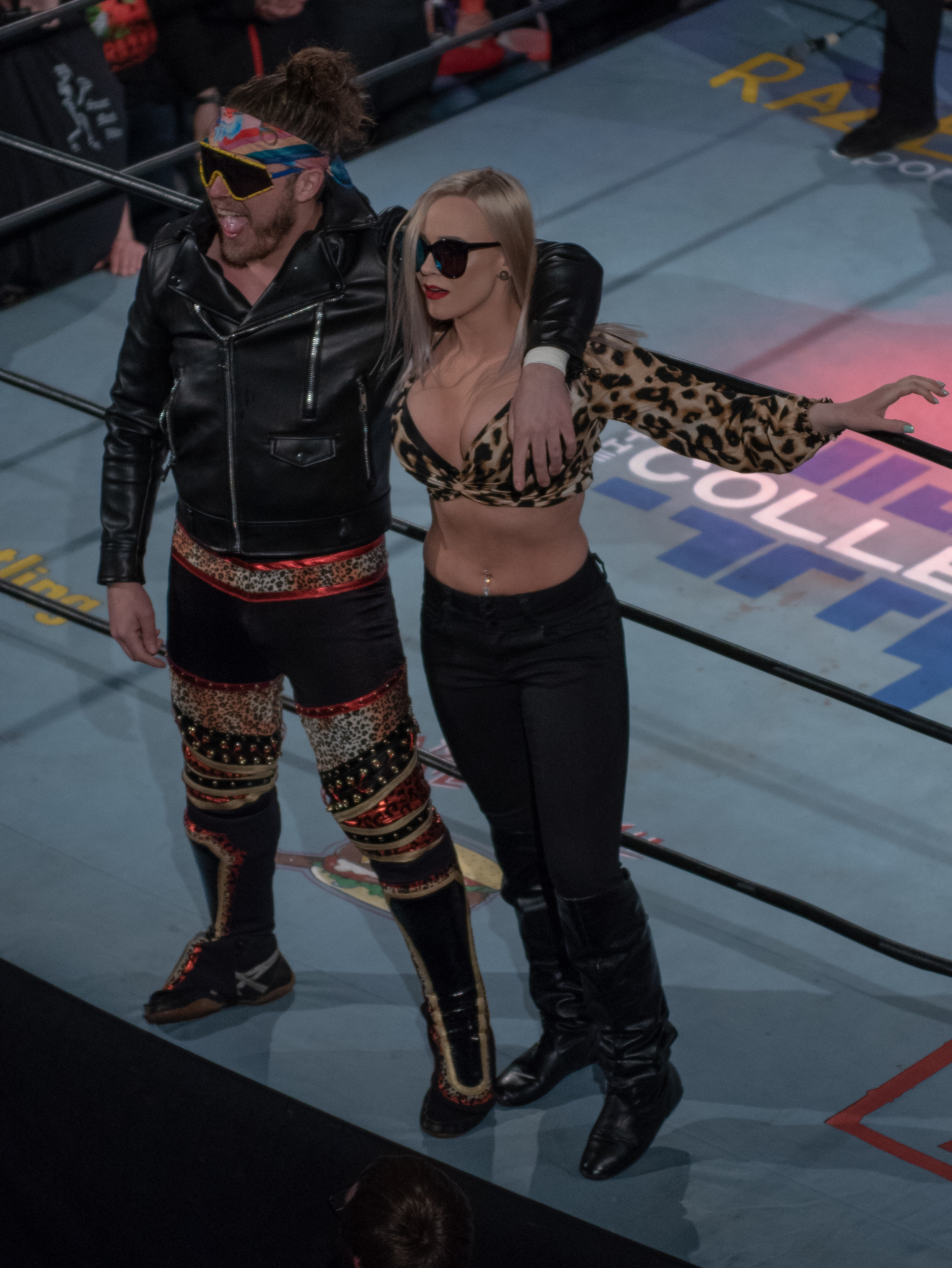
Ford alongside Joey Janela in 2019

Ford debuted during the December 17 edition of the CZW Dojo Wars, where she and George Gatton defeated Conor Claxton & Frankie Pickard in a tag team match. She won her first CZW singles match on the December 31, defeating Dave McCall. In 2015, Ford would appear in a variety of tag team matches and a few singles matches in between. She faced Brittany Blake in a singles match on the June 10 edition of the CZW Dojo Wars where Blake defeated her. At CZW Cerebral 2015, Ford wrestled a dark match won by Blake. Their rivalry continued on December 16 in a Best Two Out Of Three Falls title match for the CZW Medal Of Valor Championship. Ford was unable to capture the title from Blake during this match, closing out her second year in CZW. During the course of 2016, Ford continued her steady work of tag team matches and other match specialties, picking up a small number of singles victories along the way.

She finished 2016 in a match on December 7, with a loss to Jordynne Grace, an opponent she first wrestled seven months earlier in 2016 at WSU Unshakable. Their rematch ended in the same result, with Grace defeating Ford.

=== All Elite Wrestling (2019–present) ===
==== Various feuds (2019–2024) ====
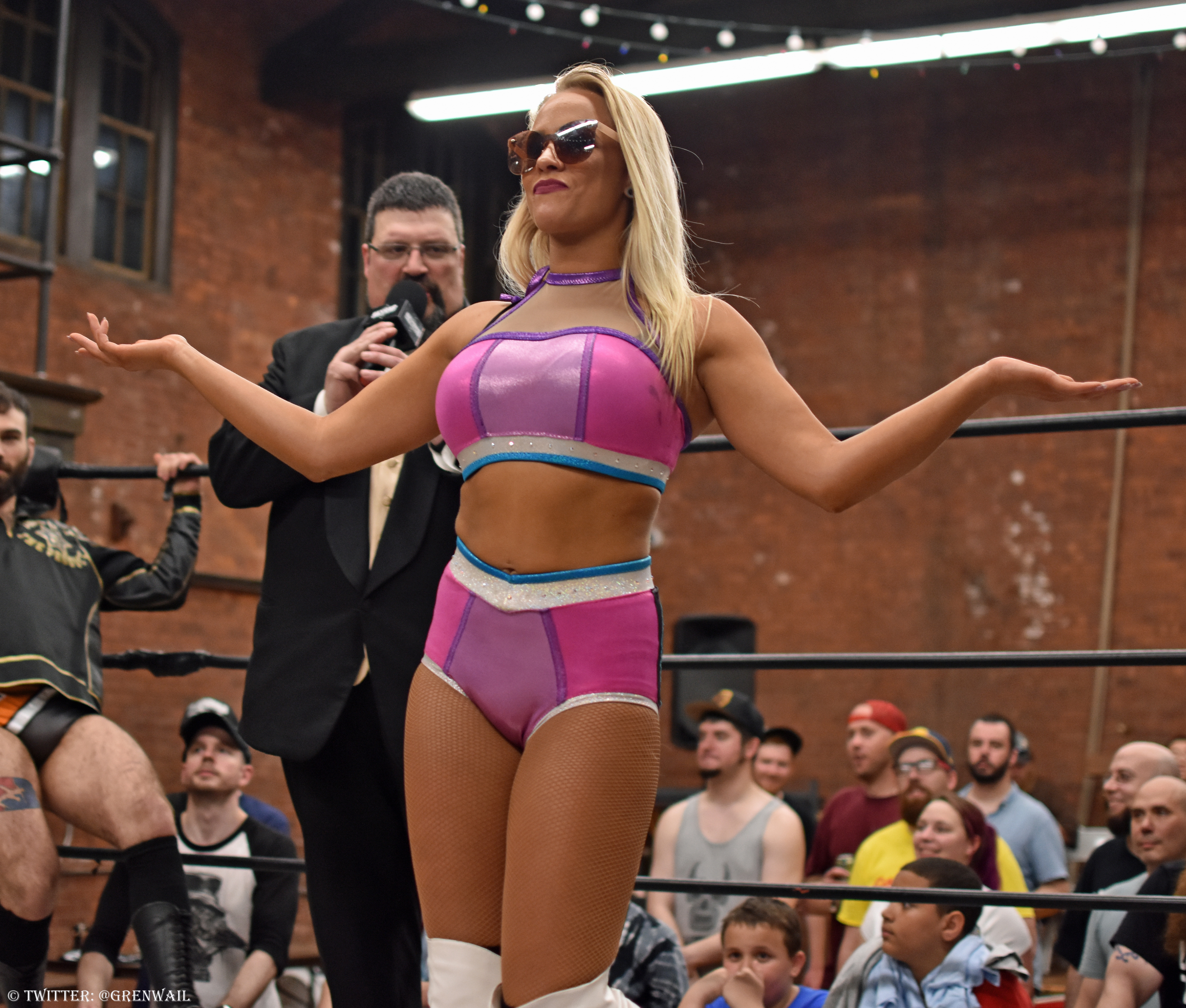
Ford in May 2018

On January 8, 2019, AEW announced that Ford would be joining the company alongside Joey Janela later in 2019, and accompanying him at the inaugural AEW event, Double or Nothing, she would wrestle her first ever AEW Match in the Casino Battle Royal, at All Out, She later began managing her real-life boyfriend Kip Sabian as they feuded with Janela. On October 9, 2019, Ford had her next match in AEW on the first ever AEW Dark episode where she teamed up with Bea Priestley against Allie and Britt Baker where they were defeated. Ford picked up her first win in AEW on the March 3 episode of Dark where she teamed with Baker to defeat Yuka Sakazaki and Riho.

On May 23, 2020, Ford had her first ever PPV match on Double or Nothing facing Kris Statlander which Ford was a last minute replacement in the match due to Baker being injured where Ford was defeated. On the June 10 episode of AEW Dynamite, Ford teamed with Nyla Rose to defeat Hikaru Shida and Statlander where she pinned Shida thus earning her an AEW Women's World Championship match at Fyter Fest. At the event, Ford was unsuccessful at capturing the title as she was defeated by Shida. At All Out, Ford announced that she and Sabian were getting married while also teasing that they will reveal who his best man is for the wedding on the following Dynamite. On the September 9 episode of Dynamite, Miro was revealed to be the best man for Sabian and Ford's wedding. On the October 23, 2021, episode of Dynamite, Ford competed in the AEW TBS Women's championship tournament where she faced Ruby Soho and lost. After months of feuding, Ford and The Bunny lost in a street fight against Anna Jay and Tay Conti on the December 31, 2021, episode of AEW Rampage. On July 8, 2022, after Tony Khan received criticism over not utilizing Ford since January, he announced that she is not medically clear to compete. On August 15, Ford made her return to AEW on AEW Dark Elevation defeating Heather Reckless by submission.

After a two-year hiatus following extended health difficulties, Ford made her return on the October 8, 2024 episode of AEW Dynamite attacking Jamie Hayter with a steel chair before being chased away by Hayter. On the October 19 episode of Collision, Ford attacked Hayter due to belief of being forgotten during her two-year hiatus. On the October 26 episode of Collision, she made her in-ring return in over two years in a victory against Robyn Renegade. Her feud with Hayter would lead to a match on the November 6 episode of Dynamite, which Ford would lose to Jamie Hayter, and would further lose the following week to Britt Baker.

==== MegaBad (2025–present) ====
On the February 19, 2025 episode of Dynamite, Ford formed an alliance with Megan Bayne. On the March 5, 2025 episode of Dynamite, the duo scored their first victory against Kris Statlander and Thunder Rosa. Ford wrestled at the Double or Nothing pre-show match alongside Megan Bayne, and was defeated by Harley Cameron and Anna Jay. The duo faced Cameron and Jay in a rematch on the following Dynamite, with Ford and Bayne coming out victorious. Ford was injured during the October 22, 2025 edition of Dynamite and the following week it was announced she suffered a torn ligament that would require surgery, rendering her out indefinitely.

Ford returned to action on January 14, 2026 at Collision: Maximum Carnage. On the February 4 episode of Dynamite, Ford and Bayne, now known as "MegaBad", defeated the regining AEW Women's World Tag Team Champions Babes of Wrath (Harley Cameron and Willow Nightingale) in a championship eliminator match, earning a title opportunity. On February 14 at Grand Slam Australia, MegaBad failed to win the tag titles from Babes of Wrath., on the February 25th edition of Dynamite, Ford would injure her ankle in a tag team championship rematch against The Babes of Wrath.

== Personal life ==
Hasler dated wrestler Joey Janela on and off for four years, before the two broke up in late 2018. In April 2020, Hasler got engaged to Kip Sabian. On the December 23, 2020, episode of AEW Dynamite: Holiday Bash, Sabian and Ford announced that they would have a beach wedding on the February 3, 2021, episode of AEW Dynamite: Beach Break. They married on February 3, 2021. In March 2023, Ford and Sabian disclosed to the public that Ford had suffered a miscarriage during a 2022 pregnancy.

== Championships and accomplishments ==
- All Elite Wrestling
  - AEW Dynamite Awards (1 time)
    - Biggest WTF Moment (2022) – TayJay (Anna Jay and Tay Conti) vs. The Bunny and Penelope Ford in a Street Fight on New's Year Smash (December 31)
- DDT Pro-Wrestling
  - Ironman Heavymetalweight Championship (1 time)
- Pro Wrestling After Dark
  - SAW Women's Championship (1 time)
- Pro Wrestling Illustrated
  - Ranked No. 48 of the top 100 female wrestlers in the PWI Women's 100 in 2020
- Queens of Combat
  - QOC Tag Team Championship (1 time) – with Maria Manic
- Women Superstars Uncensored
  - WSU Tag Team Championship (1 time) – with Maria Manic
