= Tay Melo =

Brazilian professional wrestler and judoka

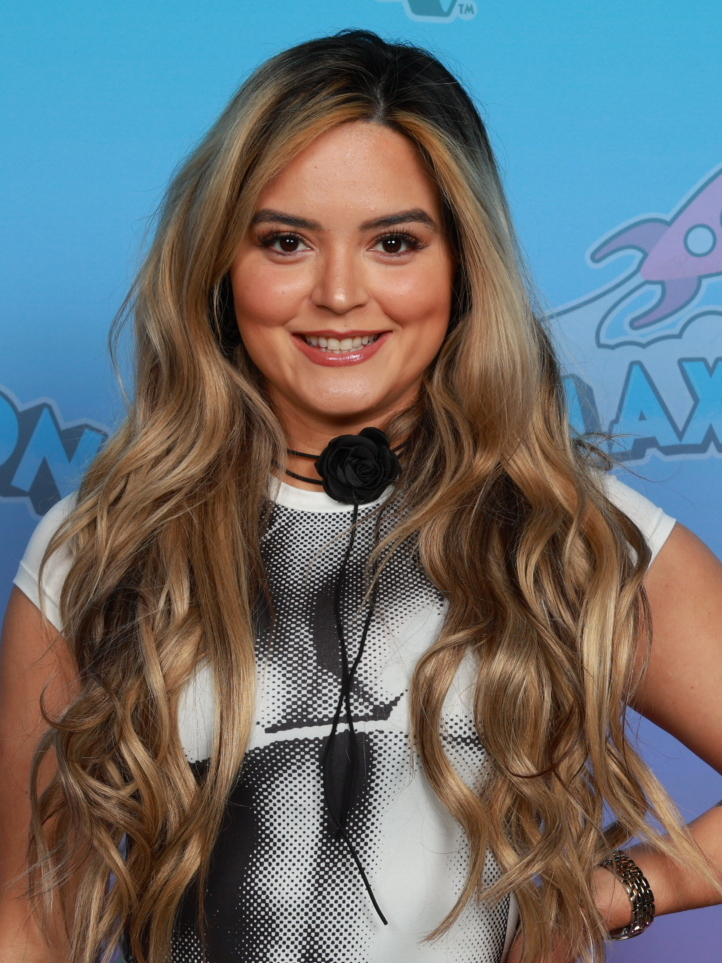
- Melo in 2023

Personal information
- Born: Taynara Melo de Carvalho; June 9, 1995 (age 31) Rio de Janeiro, Brazil
- Spouses: Jorge Conti (m. 2017; div. 2021); Sammy Guevara (m. 2022)
- Children: 1

Professional wrestling career
- Ring name(s): Tay Conti; Tay Melo; Taynara Conti; Taynara Melo
- Billed height: 5 ft 5 in (165 cm)
- Billed weight: 125 lb (57 kg)
- Billed from: Rio de Janeiro, Brazil
- Trained by: Dustin Rhodes; WWE Performance Center
- Debut: April 1, 2017

Taynara Melo Guevara (née de Carvalho and formerly Conti; born June 9, 1995) is a Brazilian professional wrestler and judoka. She is best known for her tenures in All Elite Wrestling (AEW), where she performed under the ring name Tay Melo (/ˈtaɪ/ TY), and in WWE, where she performed as Taynara Conti.

Prior to joining AEW, Melo performed for WWE's NXT brand from 2017 to 2020. Through a partnership with AEW in 2022, she also appeared in the Mexican promotion Lucha Libre AAA Worldwide (AAA), where she was a former one-time AAA World Mixed Tag Team Champion with real life husband Sammy Guevara as members of AEW's Jericho Appreciation Society stable. She took a maternity leave from AEW in January 2023 and made her in-ring return at an event for AEW's Japanese partner promotion, World Wonder Ring Stardom, in January 2025 before making her return to AEW that June. She departed AEW in July 2026.

== Early life and judo ==
Taynara Melo de Carvalho was born on June 9, 1995, in Rio de Janeiro, Brazil. She has a brother and two sisters, one of whom is adopted. Melo grew up in Rio's notorious poverty-stricken and crime-infested favelas. She holds a black belt in judo and a blue belt in Brazilian jiu-jitsu. Melo briefly went to law school in Brazil and participated in trials for the Brazilian Olympic team at the 2016 Summer Olympics prior to joining WWE.

Melo began her athletic career in artistic gymnastics in CR Vasco da Gama, but soon migrated to martial arts. She initially fought for the judo team Brasil vale ouro ("Brazil is worth gold") and later joined Brazilian sports and education NGO Instituto Reação, led by Olympic judoka Flávio Canto. Melo was a regional champion and four-time state champion. In addition, she was a four-time Brazilian runner up. She joined the Brazilian team and participated in the European circuit in Portugal and Germany.

== Professional wrestling career ==
=== WWE (2016–2020) ===
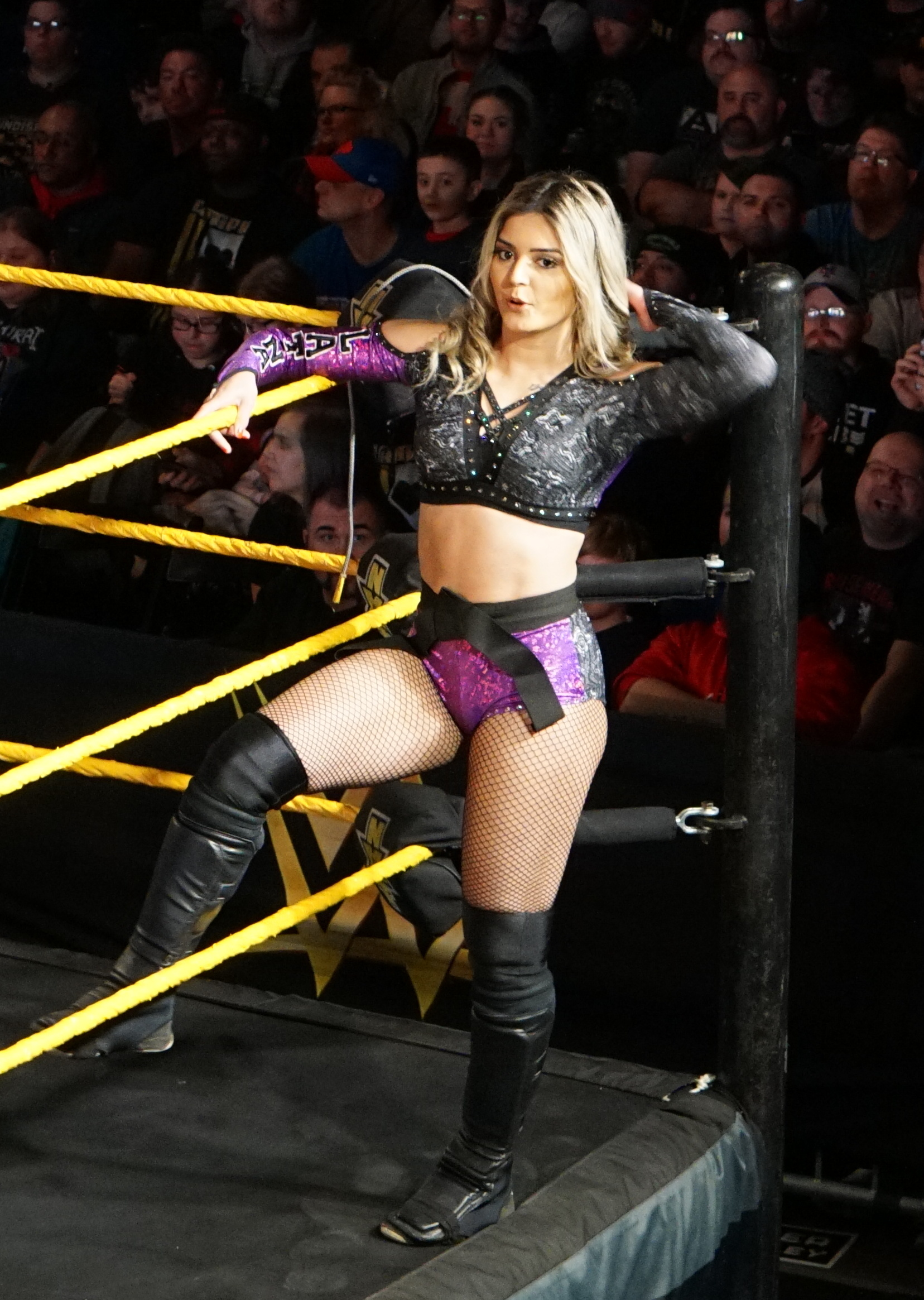
Conti at a live event in 2020

In October 2016, Melo was announced as having signed with WWE and reported to the WWE Performance Center. She made her professional wrestling debut as Taynara Conti at WrestleMania Axxess in Orlando, Florida on April 1, 2017, competing against Sarah Bridges in a losing effort. She took part in the inaugural Mae Young Classic, during which she lost to Lacey Evans in the first round of the tournament.

Conti appeared on television on the October 11 episode of NXT, interfering in a triple threat match between Nikki Cross, Peyton Royce, and Liv Morgan on behalf of The Undisputed Era (Adam Cole, Bobby Fish, and Kyle O'Reilly) to prevent Cross from winning the match. This led to a match between Conti and Cross on the November 1 episode of NXT, where Conti lost. On April 8, 2018, Conti performed during the pre-show of WrestleMania 34, competing in the WrestleMania Women's Battle Royal, becoming the first female Brazilian to compete on the evening of WrestleMania. Later in the year, Conti qualified for the 2018 Mae Young Classic tournament after she defeated Vanessa Borne. She defeated Jessie Elaban in the first round but lost to Lacey Lane in the second round.

On April 20, 2020, Conti was released from her WWE contract as a result of budget cuts due to the COVID-19 pandemic. Like all other talent released, she remained under the 90-day no compete clause, which expired on July 23, 2020. Conti later revealed in an interview that she had been unhappy for months at WWE and wanted to be released, but the company initially would not grant her a release out of fear she would go to All Elite Wrestling (AEW).

=== All Elite Wrestling (2020–2026) ===
On August 4, 2020, Melo appeared on AEW as Tay Conti, participating in the AEW Women's Tag Team Cup Tournament: The Deadly Draw and teaming with Anna Jay. The team, known officially as TayJay, defeated Nyla Rose and Ariane Andrew in the quarterfinals but lost to Ivelisse and Diamante during the semi-finals. On the August 26 episode of Dynamite, she received a contract from the stable The Dark Order to join them. On September 9, AEW announced that Conti had signed with the company.

On the January 13, 2021, episode of Dynamite, Conti competed for the NWA World Women's Championship for the first time, and was defeated by Serena Deeb. In the following weeks, Conti earned a title match for the AEW Women's World Championship, but she was not successful in beating the champion, Hikaru Shida, on the April 21 episode of Dynamite. In September, Conti and Anna Jay began a feud with Penelope Ford and The Bunny in a series of singles and tag matches on Dynamite and Rampage. On November 13, Conti fought again for the AEW Women's World Championship, this time facing defending champion Britt Baker at Full Gear but came up unsuccessful. The TayJay/Bunny & Ford feud came to a head when the team of Jay and Conti defeated the team of The Bunny and Ford in a street fight on December 31 on Rampage.

On March 6, 2022, at Revolution, Conti faced Jade Cargill for the AEW TBS Championship in a losing effort. After months of feuding, on May 29 at Double or Nothing Conti teamed up with Sammy Guevara and Frankie Kazarian in a trios mixed tag team match facing American Top Team's Ethan Page, Paige VanZant and Scorpio Sky, which Conti's team lost. On June 15, at Road Rager, Conti along with Guevara, joined the Jericho Appreciation Society, turning heel. On August 12 on Rampage Quake by the Lake under the new ring name Tay Melo, teamed up with Guevara defending the AAA World Mixed Tag Team Championship against Dante Martin and Skye Blue, which they successfully retained.

Melo and Guevara then started a feud with Ruby Soho and Ortiz, trading wins during August before defeating them at All Out due to interference from Anna Jay. The feud between Melo and Soho resumed on the November 30 episode of Dynamite, leading to a match at Winter Is Coming where Soho defeated Melo. The feud continued with Melo and Jay defeating Soho and Willow Nightingale on the December 28 episode of Dynamite; Soho and Nightingale however defeated Melo and Jay on the January 11, 2023, episode of Rampage in a street fight.

After a two-year absence from television, Melo made her return to AEW on June 4, 2025 at Fyter Fest, where she saved Anna Jay from an attack from Megan Bayne and Penelope Ford, turning face in the process and reuniting TayJay. The following week at Summer Blockbuster, TayJay defeated Bayne and Ford. On July 12 at All In, Melo competed in the women's Casino Gauntlet match, which was won by Athena. On November 19, TayJay faced Bayne and Marina Shafir in the AEW Women's World Tag Team Championship tournament to crown the inaugural champions losing to them in the first round. This loss gathered criticism from fans as they were the longest tenured women's tag team in the company.

On June 6, 2026, TayJay faced 'Divine Dominion' (Bayne and Lena Kross), for the AEW Women's World Tag Team Championships which the team lost, after the match Melo requested her release from AEW and it was granted a month later with AEW president Tony Khan stating that Melo would be taking a hiatus from professional wrestling. On November 11, 2026 she was removed from the AEW Roster page, officially ending her six-year run.

=== Lucha Libre AAA Worldwide (2022) ===
On April 30, 2022, Conti made her AAA debut teaming with Sammy Guevara to defeat Los Vipers, Maravilla and Látigo, and Sexy Star II and Komander to win the AAA World Mixed Tag Team Championship at Triplemanía XXX. For most of the match, La Parka Negra would wrestle in Guevara's place.

=== World Wonder Ring Stardom (2025) ===
On January 3, 2025, following a 22-month hiatus from wrestling, Melo made her in ring return and debut for Stardom at New Year Dream. there, she teamed with Mina Shirakawa and faced the team of Athena and Thekla, but were defeated.

== Other media ==
Melo appeared as a main cast member for AEW All Access.

== Personal life ==
In 2017, Melo married fellow judoka Jorge Conti. In November 2021, Melo revealed that she was no longer married, and that the couple had been separated "for a long time".

Melo had been in a relationship with fellow professional wrestler Sammy Guevara since January 2022. The couple got engaged in June in Paris and were wed on August 7, 2022, in Orlando. In May 2023, at Double or Nothing, Melo and Guevara revealed they are expecting their first child, and confirmed it on their social media accounts.

On November 28, 2023, Melo gave birth to a daughter named Luna Guevara.

She is a fan of MMA (particularly the UFC and the MMA fighters Amanda Nunes and Charles Oliveira), often comments on the events and fights of these events on her social media, in addition to having declared that she is open to a challenge of fighting MMA in the future and that she has visited a UFC Gym several times.

== Championships and accomplishments ==
- All Elite Wrestling
  - AEW Dynamite Awards (1 time)
    - Biggest WTF Moment (2022) – TayJay (Anna Jay and Tay Conti) vs. The Bunny and Penelope Ford in a Street Fight on New's Year Smash (December 31)
- Inside the Ropes
  - Most Improved Wrestler (2021)
- Lucha Libre AAA Worldwide
  - AAA World Mixed Tag Team Championship (1 time) – with Sammy Guevara
- Pro Wrestling Illustrated
  - Ranked No. 49 of the top 150 female wrestlers in the PWI Women's 150 in 2021
- Wrestling Observer Newsletter
  - Most Improved (2021)
