= Anna Jay =

American professional wrestler (born 1998)

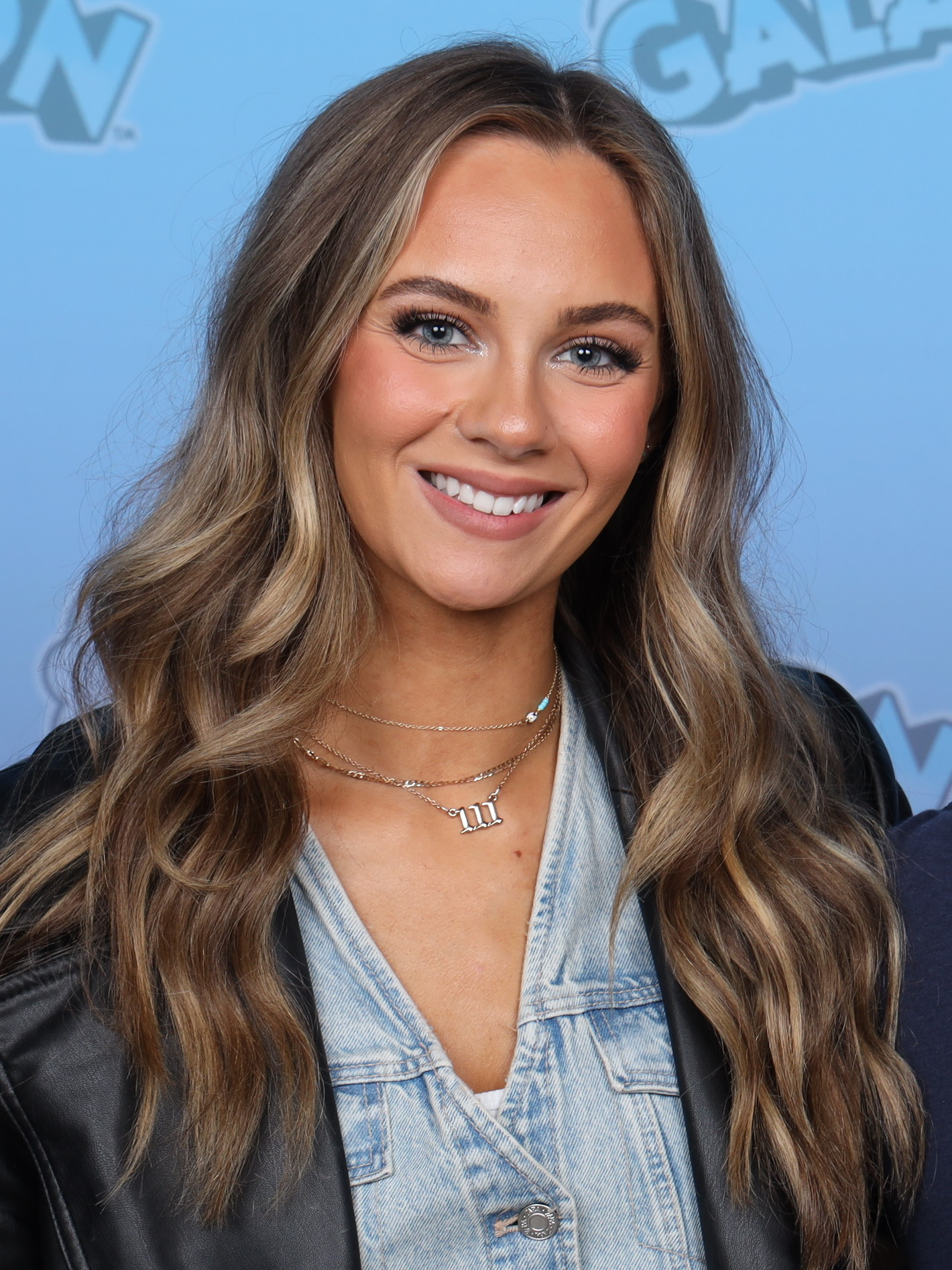
- Jay in 2023

Personal information
- Born: Anna Marie Jernigan; July 15, 1998 (age 28) Brunswick, Georgia, U.S.
- Life partners: Jack Perry (2021–present)

Professional wrestling career
- Ring name(s): Anna Jay; Anna Jay A.S. Anna Jayy
- Billed height: 5 ft 6 in (168 cm)
- Billed weight: 143 lb (65 kg)
- Billed from: Brunswick, Georgia; St. Simons Island, Georgia
- Trained by: Glacier; Q. T. Marshall
- Debut: September 14, 2019

Anna Marie Jernigan (born July 15, 1998) is an American professional wrestler. She is signed to All Elite Wrestling (AEW), where she performs under the ring name Anna Jay.

== Professional wrestling career ==
=== Training and independent circuit (2018–2020) ===
Jay started training at One Fall Power Factory in July 2018. In April 2019 during training, she suffered a shoulder injury that required surgery and was out of action for 4 to 6 months. On September 14, 2019, Jay made her debut at Glacier's charity event "The Battle of Altama". In January 2020, Jay defeated Thunder Blonde in a hair vs. hair match at a Georgia Premier Wrestling event.

=== All Elite Wrestling (2020–present) ===
==== The Dark Order (2020–2022) ====
Jay made her AEW debut on Dynamite on April 1, 2020, losing to Hikaru Shida in singles competition. She was announced as having signed with the company on April 6. Following a loss to Abadon on the June 17 episode of Dynamite, she was then helped backstage by The Dark Order. Jay teamed with Tay Conti as "TayJay" in the AEW Women's Tag Team Cup Tournament: The Deadly Draw. They advanced in the quarterfinals by defeating Nyla Rose and Ariane Andrew but lost to Ivelisse and Diamante during the semifinals. She was officially introduced as a member of The Dark Order on the August 27 episode of Dynamite. On the November 25 episode of Dynamite, Jay challenged Shida for the AEW Women's World Championship in a losing effort. On December 30, she and Conti defeated Britt Baker and Penelope Ford on the special episode of Dynamite and tribute to deceased leader of The Dark Order, Brodie Lee, dubbed the Brodie Lee Celebration of Life. In February 2021, Jay was set to compete in the AEW Women's World Championship Eliminator Tournament but was taken off after suffering a shoulder injury during training. She underwent surgery the following month, and was expected not to wrestle for 6–12 months.

Jay returned from injury on the September 1 episode of Dynamite, saving Conti from an attack by Ford and The Bunny after Conti defeated Ford in a match. In November, Jay competed in the TBS Women's Championship Tournament, where she lost to Jamie Hayter in the first round. After months of feuding, the team of Jay and Conti defeated the team of Ford and The Bunny in a street fight on December 31 on Rampage. Jay then challenged Jade Cargill for the AEW TBS Championship in the main event of the January 21, 2022, edition of Rampage, where she was unsuccessful. On May 29, Jay faced Cargill for the championship again at Double or Nothing where she was unsuccessful again.

==== Jericho Appreciation Society (2022–2023) ====
On July 20, during Night 2 of Fyter Fest, Jay turned heel by attacking Ruby Soho, thus reuniting with Conti and joining the Jericho Appreciation Society. After her heel turn, Jay would go on to defeat Ruby Soho during the Rampage portion of Fight for the Fallen, choking Soho out with her own arm brace.

Her heel turn would also see a gimmick change for Jay, who would often threaten to choke people out and even do so twice during backstage interviews. She would also adopt the new ring name of Anna Jay A.S. as a reference to her new stable, while also being referred by her original name. Jay and Melo would continue their feud with Soho throughout the rest of 2022 and the beginning of 2023, with Jay and Melo beating Soho and Willow Nightingale in a tag team match on the December 28 episode of Dynamite and Soho and Nightingale beating them in a street fight on the January 11, 2023, episode of Rampage.

After a two month absence, Jay returned on the March 25, 2023, episode of Rampage, attacking Julia Hart. This set up a match for two weeks later on the same show, which Hart won after spraying black mist onto Jay's eyes. After a series of post-match attacks, Jay and Hart would have a rematch on the May 10 episode of Dynamite, in which Hart emerged victorious once again. On the June 23 episode of Rampage, Jay competed in the Owen Hart Foundation Women's Tournament, losing to Skye Blue in the quarterfinals of the tournament. On the August 9, episode of Dynamite, Jay and the rest Jericho Appreciation Society walked out on Jericho due to his association with Don Callis, disbanding the group.

==== Championship pursuits (2023–present) ====
On the same August 9 episode of Dynamite, Jay unsuccessfully challenged Hikaru Shida for the AEW Women's World Championship. Despite the breakup, some members remained together as a group, consisting now of Matt Menard, Daniel Garcia, Angelo Parker, Jake Hager, and Anna. But constant match losses due to verbal arguments and distractions between them led Anna to quit the group.

In January 2024, Jay unsuccessfully challenged Julia Hart for The TBS Championship at Battle of the Belts IX. After a brief excursion with Japan, Jay returned to AEW in late 2024. On October 17, at Battle of the Belts XII, Jay defeated AEW Women's World Champion Mariah May in an eliminator match, earning a future title shot. On the November 2 episode of Collision, Jay was unsuccessful in capturing the title from May. Two weeks later, Jay faced May again for the title in a no disqualification match, but failed to win now unable to challenge for the title as long as May was champion, and at Holiday Bash, Jay would challenge Mercedes Mone, for the TBS championship but would fall short.

In May 2025, Jay formed an alliance with Harley Cameron to defeat Megan Bayne and Penelope Ford at the Double or Nothing pre-show. On June 4 at Fyter Fest, Jay reunited with Tay Melo (formerly Tay Conti) against Bayne and Ford, reuniting TayJay. The following week at Summer Blockbuster, TayJay defeated Bayne and Ford. TayJay would also take part in the tournament to determine the inaugural AEW Women's World Tag Team Champions, but were eliminated by Bayne and Marina Shafir.

After a six-month absence, Jay returned on the May 2, 2026 episode of Collision, where she unsuccessfully challenged Willow Nightingale for the TBS Championship. In July 2026, it was announced that Jay had suffered another shoulder injury and Melo had departed AEW, effectively ending TayJay.

=== World Wonder Ring Stardom (2024) ===
From August 10 to 31, Jay took part in World Wonder Ring Stardom's 2024 5 Star Grand Prix, her first time ever wrestling in Japan and in the tournament. Jay was placed in the Blue Stars A Block, where she finished with 6 points and failed to reach the playoff stage.

== Personal life ==
On June 28, 2021, Jay revealed over social media that she is in a relationship with fellow AEW wrestler Jack Perry.

== Championships and accomplishments ==
- All Elite Wrestling
  - AEW Dynamite Awards (1 time)
    - Biggest WTF Moment (2022) – TayJay (Anna Jay and Tay Conti) vs. The Bunny and Penelope Ford in a Street Fight on New's Year Smash (December 31)
- Pro Wrestling Illustrated
  - Ranked No. 103 of the top 150 female wrestlers in the PWI Women's 150 in 2022

== Luchas de Apuestas record ==
Winner (wager)	Loser (wager)	Location	Event	Date	Notes
Anna Jay (hair)	Thunder Blonde (hair)	Canton, Georgia	GPW Edge of Darkness	January 17, 2020	
