= Daily's Place =

Amphitheater in Florida, United States

Coordinates: 30.322088°N 81.637983°W

- Full name: Daily's Place Amphitheater at EverBank Stadium
- Former names: Jacksonville Jaguars Amphitheater (planning/construction)
- Address: 1 Daily's Place
- Location: Jacksonville, Florida, U.S.
- Owner: City of Jacksonville
- Operator: Bold Events
- Capacity: 5,500

Construction
- Groundbreaking: August 19, 2016
- Opened: May 27, 2017
- Cost: $44.8 million ($60.1 million in 2025 dollars)
- Architect: Populous
- Services engineer: ME Engineers Inc.
- General contractor: Danis Construction
- Main contractor: Hunt Construction Group

Website
- dailysplace.com

Daily's Place is an amphitheater in Downtown Jacksonville, Florida. The venue is connected to the south end of EverBank Stadium and shares space with a "flex field" indoor practice facility for the Jacksonville Jaguars. It opened in May 2017 and seats 5,500 spectators. Since 2019, the amphitheater has become nationally known as the home venue for the U.S. professional wrestling promotion All Elite Wrestling (AEW).

Naming rights were secured by Daily's, a local convenience store chain.

== Background ==
The venue was first proposed in 2009 as a complete renovation of the aging pavilion tent at Metropolitan Park. After a city council meeting held in January 2010, renovations plans were placed on hold, however the demolition of "Kid Kampus" continued with the space becoming a grassy field by 2011.

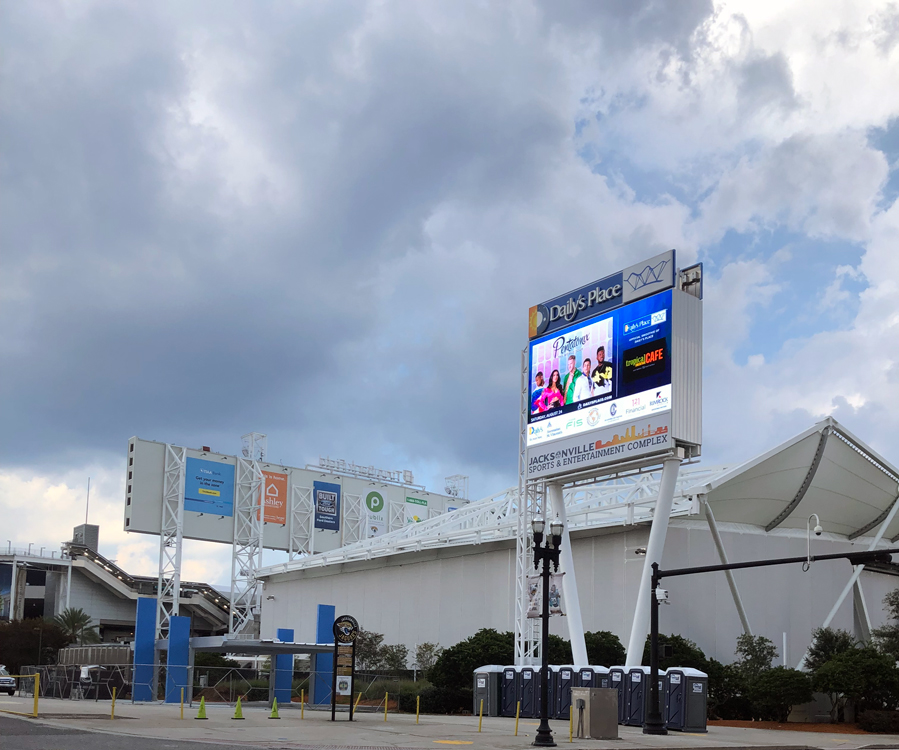
Exterior view with marquee of venue (c.2019)

In early 2015, Shahid Khan, owner of Jaguars, proposed a plan to develop the eastern area of Downtown Jacksonville. Focusing on the Shipyards, the plan sought to develop the space into a commercial, residential and leisure complex. Projected renderings saw the demolition of the pavilion tent and constructing a 9,000 seat outdoor amphitheater. When reviewed by the city council, these plans were denied due to concerns over environmental impact. With the success of the Everbank Field renovations, Khan developed new plans for the Shipyards area, which were ultimately approved by the city.

The Jaguars announced plans for additions and renovations to Everbank Field, including the addition of an amphitheater, at their 2015 State of the Franchise address. The $90 million budget for the enhancements was set to be split by the City of Jacksonville and Khan's Iguana Investments.

Phase 1 of construction saw a revamp of the US Assure Club with turf of the football field. Phase 2 of the plan saw the addition of an amphitheater and an indoor practice field. Initial design concepts saw the amphitheater as an outdoor, covered venue featuring a mezzanine and balcony; with the practice area being a separate building. Both venues were connected to the stadium and parking areas via covered walkway. Later renderings saw the two spaces as one space, connected via one roof and divided via hangar doors.

Construction was set to begin in July 2016 however financial restrictions and permits pushed the groundbreaking back to August 2016. Final costs estimated to be over $40 million. The facility was initially announced to be managed by SMG, Iguana Investments created a sister company, Bold Events, that will operate and promote all events at the amphitheater and stadium. With this partnership, 500 presale tickets will be available for Jaguars season ticket holders.

== Design ==
The venue was designed by the architectural firm Populous (who also designed all three sports venues in Jacksonville). First renderings show the amphitheater with a sleek technical design resembling a spaceship. Final design included an indoor tiered setting joined with the flex field. Exterior structure is composed of steel trusses creating the cage façade with PTFE fabric. The fabric roofing (similar to Ashe Stadium) provides natural ventilation and daylight and helps create dramatic LED lighting effect.

The venue features an 80-foot ceiling, the standard 60'x40' concert stage and a back house building. The amphitheater features a main floor, mezzanine and balcony, similar to the Radio City Music Hall. The main floor seats 3,500 with a general admission area (orchestral pit) that can add up to 500. The mezzanine and balcony features 1,000 seats each. The main floor also features 228-foot sliding panels on both sides that can open to create an open-air experience.

== Competitive analysis ==
With its 5,500 capacity, it is the second largest concert venue in Jacksonville (with VyStar Veterans Memorial Arena seating 15,000 and the Moran Theater seating nearly 3,000). Its closest competitor, the St. Augustine Amphitheatre, seats close to 4,000. The manager of the amphitheater, Ryan Murphy, thinks the new downtown amphitheater is a good move for Jacksonville, he feels it will not draw crowds away from the St. Augustine venue. Other amphitheaters in the metro area include:

- Coxwell Amphitheater seating 6,000 (strictly for UNF events)
- Seawalk Pavilion seating 3,000
- Unity Plaza Amphitheater seating 1,500
- Riverfront Amphitheatre seating 350

Jaguars President Mark Lamping states the purpose of the venue was to aid in revitalizing the lackluster downtown area. The venue plans to host 35-40 events per year, with many shows held around the Jaguars home games. Lamping feels this will aid in bringing tourism to the city, while its actual economic impact is unknown.

A part of what we are doing with Daily's Place is making Jaguar home weekends bigger and more special. If there are people who attend Daily's Place who have not had the opportunity to experience Everbank Field, the design of Daily's Place allows people to interact with the stadium as part of their visit. Perhaps through that interaction it will spur some curiosity and maybe lead to a desire to sample Jaguars football.

== Notable events ==
=== Professional wrestling ===
Daily's Place has served as the home base of All Elite Wrestling since the promotion's founding in 2019

Daily's Place is the home venue of All Elite Wrestling (AEW), a professional wrestling promotion that, like the Jaguars, are primarily owned by the Khan family.

On July 13, 2019, AEW hosted its streaming event Fight for the Fallen at Daily's Place. On March 18 and 25, 2020, AEW temporarily moved its weekly television program Dynamite, as well as its webseries Dark, to Daily's Place, due to cancellations of its traveling broadcasts due to the COVID-19 pandemic. The tapings were held behind closed doors with no outside spectators; they used non-competing wrestlers and crew to serve as the live audience. After over a month's worth of tapings were done at an "undisclosed location" to prevent fans from showing up (later revealed to be the Nightmare Factory training complex in Norcross, Georgia), AEW returned to Daily's Place to hold its pay-per-view Double or Nothing on May 23 (with TIAA Bank Field hosting a Stadium Stampede match as the main event), re-located from Las Vegas due to the pandemic.

From that point, Daily's Place became AEW's home base, with all subsequent episodes of Dynamite, Dark, and pay-per-views originating from there during the pandemic period, with fans returning during the summer of 2020 at first at limited capacity, then gradually increasing as time went on. The promotion returned to live touring on July 7, 2021, though AEW still continues to periodically hold events at Daily's Place, promoted as "Homecoming" shows.

=== Concerts ===
The venue opened on May 27, 2017, with a concert by the Jacksonville-based Tedeschi Trucks Band.

On April 23, 2021, Machine Gun Kelly performed at Daily's Place on a tour in support of his album Tickets to My Downfall—marking the first full-capacity concert held at Daily's Place since the beginning of the COVID-19 pandemic.

On October 1, 2021, AJR performed at the venue for the last show on the 2021 leg of their OK Orchestra Tour.
