= AEW TBS Championship =

Women's professional wrestling championship

- The TBS Championship belt

Details
- Promotion: All Elite Wrestling
- Date established: October 6, 2021
- Current champion: Queen Aminata
- Date won: October 28, 2026
Statistics
- First champion: Jade Cargill
- Most reigns: Willow Nightingale (2)
- Longest reign: Mercedes Moné (584 days)
- Shortest reign: Hikaru Shida (25 days)
- Oldest champion: Hikaru Shida (38 years, 20 days)
- Youngest champion: Julia Hart (22 years, 10 days)
- Heaviest champion: Willow Nightingale (183 lb (83 kg))
- Lightest champion: Mercedes Moné (115 lb (52 kg))

The AEW TBS Championship is a women's professional wrestling television championship created and promoted by the American promotion All Elite Wrestling (AEW). Established on October 6, 2021, it is the secondary championship of the promotion's female division, and the inaugural champion was Jade Cargill. It is named after the TBS television network, which airs AEW's flagship program, Dynamite. The current champion is Queen Aminata, who is in her first reign. She won the title by defeating previous champion Persephone on Fright Night Dynamite on October 28, 2026.

== History ==
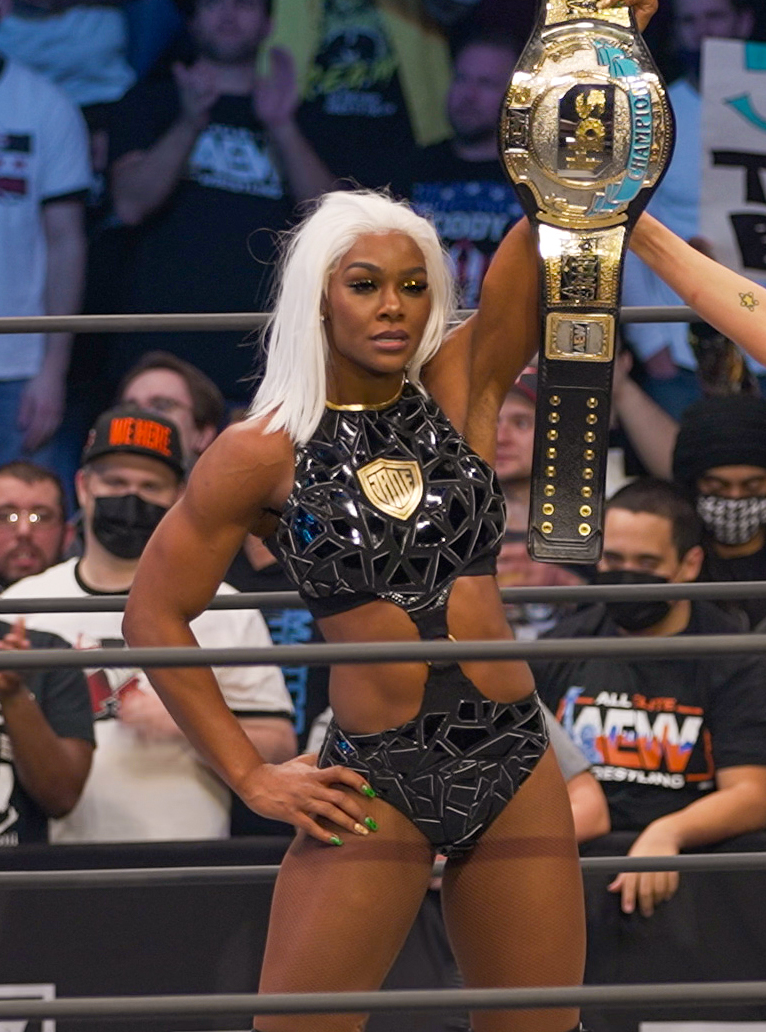
Inaugural champion Jade Cargill

In March 2020, All Elite Wrestling (AEW) established the AEW TNT Championship as a television championship for the men's division, named after the TNT television network, owned by WarnerMedia (now Warner Bros. Discovery). In May 2021, it was announced that AEW's flagship program, Dynamite, would be moving from TNT to the network's sister channel, TBS, also owned by Warner, in January 2022, while AEW's other core program at the time, Rampage, would remain on TNT. Despite Dynamite moving to TBS, wrestling journalist Dave Meltzer reported that the TNT Championship would not be renamed. Then-AEW executive and wrestler Cody Rhodes also affirmed that there were no plans to rename the championship and that there were no plans for a separate TBS Championship for male wrestlers. It was later reported that the promotion would introduce a secondary women's championship and it would instead be called the TBS Championship.

Prior to the October 6, 2021, second anniversary episode of Dynamite, AEW President and Chief Executive Officer Tony Khan said there would be a major announcement made on the show. During the episode, AEW commentator Tony Schiavone and referee Aubrey Edwards officially unveiled the AEW TBS Championship as a television championship for the women's division. AEW announced that the inaugural champion would be determined by a single-elimination tournament. The tournament bracket was revealed on the October 22 episode of Rampage with a 12-woman field. The tournament itself began on the October 23 episode of Dynamite and concluded on the January 5, 2022, episode, the show's debut broadcast on TBS. In the tournament final, Jade Cargill defeated Ruby Soho to become the inaugural TBS Champion.

=== TBS Championship Tournament ===
On the October 22, 2021, episode of Rampage, the participants of the inaugural TBS Championship Tournament were revealed. Tony Khan announced on Busted Open Radio that the tournament would have a 12-woman field with four of them receiving a first round bye.

First round
November 3, 2021
Anna Jay	5:52
Jamie Hayter	Pin
November 5, 2021
The Bunny	3:31
Red Velvet	Pin
October 27, 2021
Serena Deeb	11:04
Hikaru Shida	Pin
October 23, 2021
Penelope Ford	8:46
Ruby Soho	Pin

Quarterfinals
November 24, 2021
Thunder Rosa	Pin
Jamie Hayter	10:33
November 17, 2021
Jade Cargill	Pin
Red Velvet	9:47
November 17, 2021
Nyla Rose	Sub
Hikaru Shida	11:27
December 1, 2021
Kris Statlander	10:12
Ruby Soho	Pin

Semifinals
December 29, 2021
Thunder Rosa	11:00
Jade Cargill	Pin
December 22, 2021
Nyla Rose	14:36
Ruby Soho	Pin

Final
January 5, 2022
Jade Cargill	Pin
Ruby Soho	11:22

== Belt design ==
The TBS Championship belt design is nearly identical to the men's TNT Championship, with a couple of notable differences. The belt has six plates on a black leather strap. The center plate prominently features a relief TBS network logo at the center. Above the TBS logo is AEW's logo, while below the TBS logo is a blue banner that says "CHAMPION" (countering the red banner on the TNT title). The two inner side plates are the same as the TNT Championship, featuring "Tara on Techwood", 1050 Techwood Drive in Atlanta, the building that was the original home of both TNT and TBS. Also like the TNT title, the two outer side plates feature AEW's logo, while a third smaller side plate on the far right side also features the promotion's logo. This and the original TNT belt it was based on were originally commissioned by AEW and designed by Red Leather, and the actual construction of the belt was completed by Rey Rey Championship Belts.

== Reigns ==
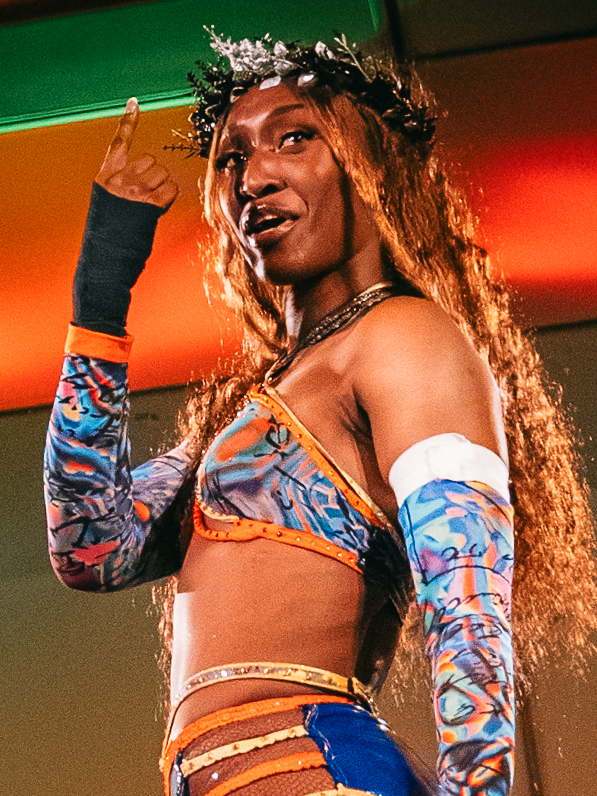
Current champion Queen Aminata

As of November 22, 2026, there have been 10 reigns between nine champions and one vacancy. Jade Cargill was the inaugural champion. Willow Nightingale has the most reigns at two. Mercedes Moné's sole reign is the longest at 584 days, while Hikaru Shida's sole reign is the shortest at 25 days. Shida is also the oldest champion, winning the title at 38, while Julia Hart is the youngest at 22, also making her the youngest female champion in AEW's history. Only two women have held the title for a continuous reign of one year (365 days) or more: Jade Cargill and Mercedes Moné.

Queen Aminata is the current champion on her first reign. She won the title by defeating previous champion Persephone on Fright Night Dynamite in St. Louis, Missouri, on October 28, 2026.

Key
No.	Overall reign number
Reign	Reign number for the specific champion
Days	Number of days held
+	Current reign is changing daily

No.	Champion	Championship change			Reign statistics		Notes	Ref.
No.	Champion	Date	Event	Location	Reign	Days	Notes	Ref.
1	Jade Cargill	January 5, 2022	Dynamite	Newark, NJ	1	508	Defeated Ruby Soho in a tournament final to become the inaugural champion.	
2	Kris Statlander	May 28, 2023	Double or Nothing	Paradise, NV	1	174		
3	Julia Hart	November 18, 2023	Full Gear	Inglewood, CA	1	155	This was a three-way match that also involved Skye Blue, who Hart pinned.	
4	Willow Nightingale	April 21, 2024	Dynasty	St. Louis, MO	1	35	This was a "House Rules" match. Nightingale's stipulation was that Skye Blue and Kris Statlander were barred from ringside.	
5	Mercedes Moné	May 26, 2024	Double or Nothing	Paradise, NV	1	584		
6	Willow Nightingale	December 31, 2025	Dynamite: New Year's Smash	Ralston, NE	2	140		
—	Vacated	May 20, 2026	Dynamite	Portland, ME	—	—	Willow Nightingale vacated the championship after sustaining a shoulder injury.	
7	Hikaru Shida	July 1, 2026	Dynamite	San Diego, CA	1	25	Last eliminated Kris Statlander in a six-woman Survival of the Fittest match to win the vacant title.	
8	Maya World	July 26, 2026	Redemption	Montreal, QC, Canada	1	35		
9	Persephone	August 30, 2026	All In; The Buy In	London, England	1	59		
10	Queen Aminata	October 28, 2026	Fright Night Dynamite	St. Louis, MO	1	25+		

== Combined reigns ==
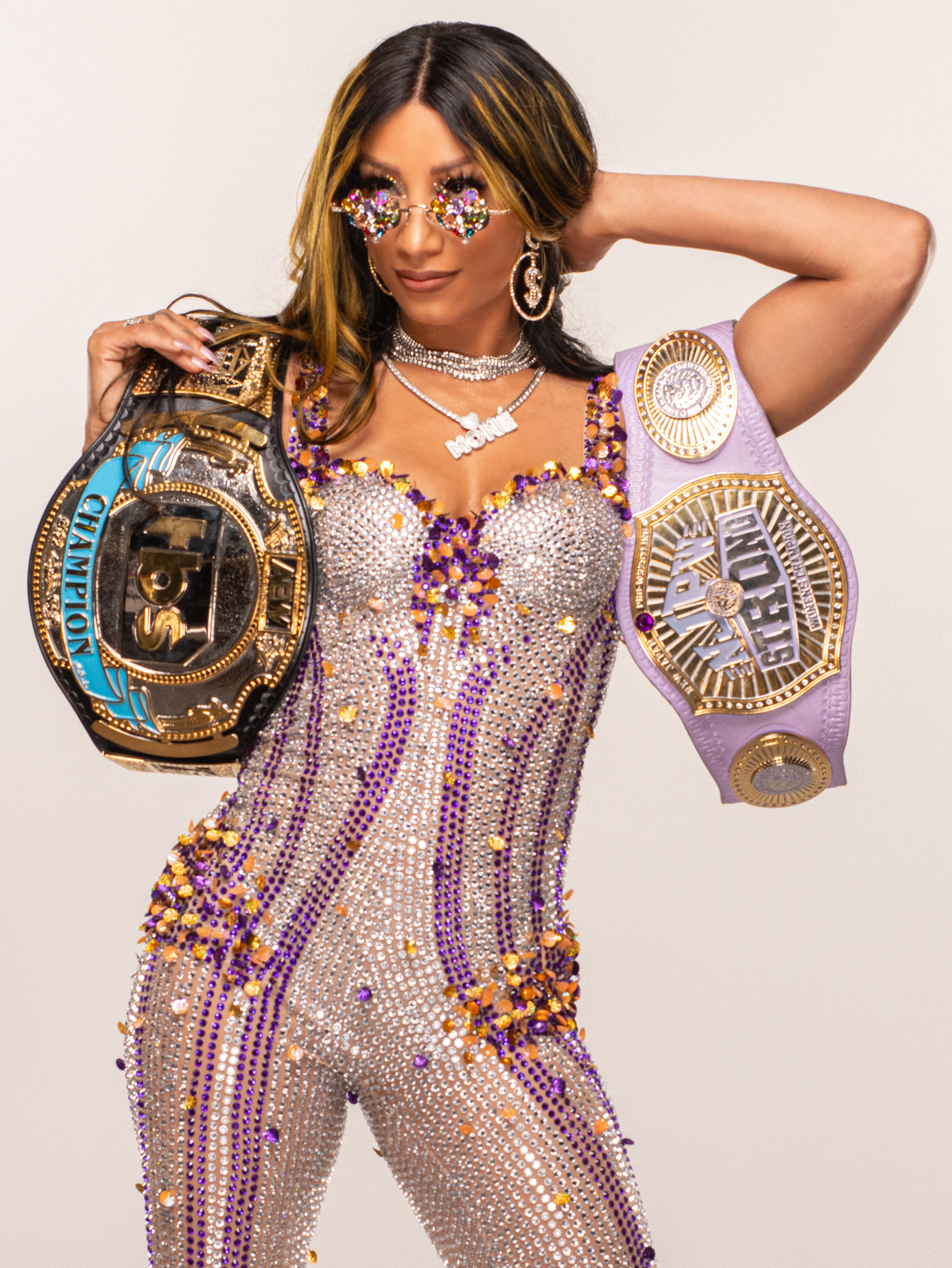
Longest-reigning champion Mercedes Moné, shown with the AEW TBS Championship on her right shoulder and the NJPW Strong Women's Championship on her left shoulder.

As of November 22, 2026.

†	Indicates the current champion

Rank	Wrestler	No. of reigns	Combined days
1	Mercedes Moné	1	584
2	Jade Cargill	1	508
3	Willow Nightingale	2	175
4	Kris Statlander	1	174
5	Julia Hart	1	155
6	Persephone	1	59
7	Maya World	1	35
8	Queen Aminata †	1	25+
9	Hikaru Shida	1	25
