= Chris Jericho's Rock 'N' Wrestling Rager at Sea =

Annual professional wrestling themed cruise

- Logo used since 2024
- Genre: Rock; heavy metal; Stand-up comedy; Professional wrestling
- Dates: Varies annually
- Venue: Norwegian Jade (2018); Norwegian Pearl (2020–2021, 2024); Norwegian Jewel (2025–present)
- Years active: 2018, 2020–2021, 2025–present
- Founder: Chris Jericho
- Website: www.chrisjerichocruise.com

Chris Jericho's Rock 'N' Wrestling Rager at Sea, also referred to as the Jericho Cruise, is an annual themed cruise and festival hosted by professional wrestler and Fozzy frontman Christopher Irvine, also known by his ring name Chris Jericho. The cruise annually features professional wrestling events, musical concerts, stand-up comedy and live podcasts.

== History ==
After attending the Kiss Kruise in 2015, Chris Jericho had pitched the idea of a professional wrestling themed cruise to WWE with the idea of bringing wrestlers from the NXT brand to perform during the cruise. However, WWE turned him down and after his departure from the promotion, he pitched the idea to Ring of Honor.

On September 19, 2017, Jericho announced that he had partnered up with Sixthman, a live events promoter which focuses on organizing multi-day themed cruises, to hold the inaugural Chris Jericho Rock 'n' Wrestling Rager at Sea with the first guests and performers announced to be Jim Ross, Ricky Steamboat, Rey Mysterio, Raven, Fozzy, Phil Campbell and the Bastard Sons, Kyng, The Dives, Jim Breuer, and The Loud & Rowdy. The cruise also featured a four-day Sea of Honor tournament produced by the American professional wrestling promotion Ring of Honor in which three of the shows on the cruise were taped to air on pay-per-view.

On March 19, 2018, it was announced that Slipknot and Stone Sour frontman Corey Taylor would be part of the inaugural cruise and would perform a solo acoustic set for the attendees. On July 3, 2018, Ring of Honor announced the brackets for the Sea of Honor tournament. During an interview with the Talk is Jericho podcast, Jericho had revealed that he had lost six figures organizing the cruise.

On April 8, 2019, the second Chris Jericho Rock 'n' Wrestling Rager at Sea was announced with the first guests and performers confirmed for the cruise being Light the Torch, Jared James Nichols, Ric Flair, Kevin Nash, Scott Hall, Booker T, and others including professional wrestling shows from the recently-formed All Elite Wrestling (AEW) promotion. On November 18, 2019, AEW announced that the January 22, 2020 episode of their weekly show, Dynamite, would be taped during the cruise as part of the Bash at the Beach television special on TNT.

On July 22, 2020, Jericho announced that the 2021 Jericho Cruise, which had been initially scheduled for February 1–5, 2021, had been postponed to October 21–25 due to the COVID-19 pandemic. During the 2021 Jericho Cruise, the rock band Stryper was joined by Jericho to perform a cover of "Breaking the Law" by Judas Priest.

During the 2025 Chris Jericho Rock 'n' Wrestling Rager at Sea, select matches from All Elite Wrestling's shows were used as part of an episode of Ring of Honor Wrestling which aired on tape delay on February 13, 2025. On October 15, 2025, Jericho announced that the 2026 Jericho Cruise would take place from November 7–11. On October 2, 2026, during an interview with TMZ, Jericho announced that AEW would be airing a live episode of Collision during the cruise while the Norwegian Jewel was docked in Miami before departing. On October 16, 2026, Jericho announced that there would be a tournament to determine the #1 contender for the Oceanic Championship.

== Events ==
Year	Dates	Ship	Location	Guests and performers	Ref
2018	October 27–31	Norwegian Jade	Miami, Florida, United States to Nassau, Bahamas	Fozzy, Corey Taylor, Stir, Kyng, Phil Campbell and the Bastard Sons, Rey Mysterio, Raven, Ricky Steamboat, Ring of Honor, Noelle Foley, Busted Open Radio, Keepin' it 100, Unprofessional Wrestling Show, Shoot To Thrill, Blizzard of Ozzy, Cherry Bombs, The Paranormal 60 with Dave Schrader, David Roy	
2020	January 20–24	Norwegian Pearl	Miami, Florida, United States to Nassau, Bahamas	Fozzy, Wrestling Observer Live, Light the Torch, Eric Bischoff, Ric Flair, Booker T, Gabriel Iglesias, Jake Roberts, Vickie Guerrero, Scott Hall, Diamond Dallas Page, Conrad Thompson, Sharmell, Lisa Marie Varon, Shaul Guerrero, Ted Irvine, Jared James Nichols, Kick Axe, Craig Gass, All Elite Wrestling, Dark Sky Choir, The Killer Queens, Rubix Kube, David Roy, Farewell to Fear, Bruce Jingles, The Vaudettes, 83 Weeks with Eric Bischoff, Talk Is Jericho,	
2021	October 21–25	Norwegian Pearl	Miami, Florida, United States to Grand Bahama Island	Fozzy, Stryper, Crobot, , Kurt Angle, The Rock 'n' Roll Express (Ricky Morton and Robert Gibson, Madusa, Brad Williams, Shaul Guerrero, Kate Quigley, Ted Irvine, Jake Roberts, Kuarantine, Jazz, Dasha Gonzalez, All Elite Wrestling, Pineapple Pete, Ryan Niemiller, Rubix Kube, Paradise Kitty, David Roy, The Vaudettes, The Nocturnal Affair	
2023	February 2–6	Norwegian Pearl	Miami, Florida, United States to Great Stirrup Cay, Bahamas	Fozzy, Quiet Riot, Royal Bliss, Raven, Shaul Guerrero, Sabu, Yuya Uemura, Ariane Andrew, ODB, Jim Duggan, Max Caster, Brad Williams, Jeff Dye, Kate Quigley, Mike Rotunda, Nick Aldis, Mickie James, Ted Irvine, Dan Lambert Swoggle, All Elite Wrestling, The Vaudettes, Luigi Primo, Priss, We Are Wasted, Kuarantine, Guardians of the Jukebox, The Nocturnal Affair, Gutter Candy, David Roy, The Major Wrestling Figure Podcast, Talk Is Jericho, Swerve City Podcast, The Paranormal 60 with Dave Schrader, Dan Lambert's World Title Time Machine, Raj Sharma, Red Cup Geoff,	
2024	January 26–30	Norwegian Pearl	Miami, Florida, United States to Cozumel, Quintana Roo, Mexico	Fozzy, The Georgia Thunderbolts, Trixter, BulletBoys, Brad Williams, Jim Duggan, Danielle Moinet, Gangrel, Ted Irvine, Último Dragón, Alex Abrahantes, Harley Cameron, Prince Nana, All Elite Wrestling, The Vaudettes feat. Shaul Guerrero, Busted Open Podcast, Femme Halen, James Durbin & The Lost Boys, Guardians of the Jukebox, Kuarantine, Les Carlsen, Fooz Fighters, The Nocturnal Affair, David Roy, Amongst The Giants, Bryan Fox and the Good Chiggens, Eleanor Kerrigan, Jonny Loquasto, The Paranormal 60 with Dave Schrader,	
2025	January 31–February 4	Norwegian Jewel	Miami, Florida, United States to Puerto Plata, Dominican Republic	Fozzy, Brad Williams, Great White, Downstait, Ernest Miller, Little Miss Nasty, Ted Irvine, RJ City, MVP, Aubrey Edwards, Christopher Daniels, Lexy Nair, Scott Steiner, Jushin Thunder Liger, Nic Nemeth, Jerry Lawler, Ash by Elegance, Nigel McGuinness, Bull Nakano, Frankie Kazarian, Al Snow, Angelina Love, Juventud Guerrera, Sonny Onoo, All Elite Wrestling, Ring of Honor, Amira Blair, Tara Zep, The Hot Damn!, Kuarantine, Guardians of the Jukebox, Excitable, Red Hot Tribute, David Roy, We Are Wasted, The Nocturnal Affair, The Paranormal 60 with Dave Schrader, The Winnipeggers, Anna Zova, Jay Washington, Red Cup Geoff	
2026	November 7–11	Norwegian Jewel	Miami, Florida, United States to Bimini, Bahamas	Fozzy, Downstait, Killer Dwarfs, Little Miss Nasty, RJ City, Marcus Monroe, April Macie, The Insight with Chris Van Vliet, Sonny Onoo, Great Muta, Perry Saturn, Ted DiBiase, Carlito, Shotzi Blackheart, Marcus Bagwell, Fred Ottman, Vampiro, Indi Hartwell, Charlie Benante, All Elite Wrestling, Ring of Honor, MicroMania, Gabby LaSpisa, Naomi Rosenblum, Emily Jaye, JB Ball The Violent Hour, The Iron Maidens, Kuarantine, Beasto Blanco, PeroxWhy?Gen, Guardians of the Jukebox, Dueling Pianos, Rybo The Wandering Minstrel, Jeremy Would Let Me Drown, David Roy, The Paranormal 60 with Dave Schrader, Red Cup Geoff, Sarah Lemos, Winifred Schrader,	

== Professional wrestling events ==
Event	Dates	Promotion(s)	Ship	Location	Main Event	Notes	Ref
Sea of Honor	October 27 2018	ROH	Norwegian Jade	Miami, Florida, United States to Nassau, Bahamas	The Young Bucks (Matt Jackson and Nick Jackson) vs. The Latin American Exchange (Santana and Ortiz)	Nights 2, 3, and 4 aired on tape delay on November 3	
Sea of Honor	October 28, 2018	ROH	Norwegian Jade	Miami, Florida, United States to Nassau, Bahamas	Jay Lethal vs. Frankie Kazarian vs. Kenny King vs. Matt Taven in a Four Corners Survival match	Nights 2, 3, and 4 aired on tape delay on November 3	
Sea of Honor	October 29, 2018	ROH	Norwegian Jade	Miami, Florida, United States to Nassau, Bahamas	Bullet Club (Cody, Kenny Omega and Marty Scurll) vs. Alpha Club (Chris Jericho, Matt Jackson and Nick Jackson)	Nights 2, 3, and 4 aired on tape delay on November 3	
Sea of Honor	October 30, 2018	ROH	Norwegian Jade	Miami, Florida, United States to Nassau, Bahamas	Mushroom Kingdom (Bowser (Cody), Luigi (Matt Jackson), Mario (Nick Jackson), Wario (Marty Scurll) and Yoshi (Hangman Page)) vs. Team Impact Wrestling (Brian Cage, Johnny Impact, Ortiz, Sami Callihan and Santana)	Nights 2, 3, and 4 aired on tape delay on November 3	
Part Dedeux: Second Wave	January 20, 2020	AEW	Norwegian Pearl	Miami, Florida, United States to Nassau, Bahamas	The Elite (Kenny Omega, Matt Jackson, and Nick Jackson) vs. SoCal Uncensored (Christopher Daniels, Frankie Kazarian, and Scorpio Sky) in a six man tag team match		
Bash at the Beach	January 21, 2020	AEW	Norwegian Pearl	Miami, Florida, United States to Nassau, Bahamas	Jon Moxley vs. Pac in an AEW World Championship #1 contendership tournament final match	Aired on tape delay on January 22, 2020 as a special episode of Dynamite	
Part Dedeux: Second Wave	January 22, 2020	AEW	Norwegian Pearl	Miami, Florida, United States to Nassau, Bahamas	Kenny Omega and Riho vs. Kip Sabian and Penelope Ford		
Part Dedeux: Second Wave	January 23, 2020	AEW	Norwegian Pearl	Miami, Florida, United States to Nassau, Bahamas	Cody vs. Joey Janela		
Triple Whammy	October 21, 2021	AEW	Norwegian Pearl	Miami, Florida, United States to Grand Bahama Island	Chuck Taylor and Orange Cassidy vs. The Dark Order (Evil Uno and Stu Grayson)		
Triple Whammy	October 22, 2021	AEW	Norwegian Pearl	Miami, Florida, United States to Grand Bahama Island	Chuck Taylor, Orange Cassidy, and Wheeler Yuta vs. The Wingmen (Cezar Bononi, JD Drake, and Peter Avalon) in a six man tag team match		
Triple Whammy	October 23, 2021	AEW	Norwegian Pearl	Miami, Florida, United States to Grand Bahama Island	Ricky Starks (c) vs. Chuck Taylor for the FTW Championship		
Triple Whammy	October 25, 2021	AEW	Norwegian Pearl	Miami, Florida, United States to Grand Bahama Island	Chris Jericho and Orange Cassidy vs. Team Taz (Powerhouse Hobbs and Ricky Starks)		
Four Leaf Clover	February 2, 2023	AEW	Norwegian Pearl	Miami, Florida, United States to Great Stirrup Cay, Bahamas	Eddie Kingston vs. Jake Hager		
Four Leaf Clover	February 3, 2023	AEW	Norwegian Pearl	Miami, Florida, United States to Great Stirrup Cay, Bahamas	Matt Cardona vs. Dante Martin in an Oceanic Championship tournament final match		
Four Leaf Clover	February 4, 2023	AEW	Norwegian Pearl	Miami, Florida, United States to Great Stirrup Cay, Bahamas	Action Andretti and Ricky Starks vs. The Jericho Appreciation Society (Angelo Parker and Matt Menard)		
Four Leaf Clover	February 5, 2023	AEW	Norwegian Pearl	Miami, Florida, United States to Great Stirrup Cay, Bahamas	The Gunns (Austin Gunn and Colten Gunn) vs. Jerichohausen (Chris Jericho and Danhausen)		
Five Alive	January 26, 2024	AEW	Norwegian Pearl	Miami, Florida, United States to Cozumel, Quintana Roo, Mexico	Swerve Strickland (w/Prince Nana) vs. Trent Beretta (w/Rocky Romero)		
Five Alive	January 27, 2024	AEW	Norwegian Pearl	Miami, Florida, United States to Cozumel, Quintana Roo, Mexico	Michael Oku vs. Mike Bailey		
Five Alive	January 28, 2024	AEW	Norwegian Pearl	Miami, Florida, United States to Cozumel, Quintana Roo, Mexico	Top Flight (Dante Martin and Darius Martin) and Action Andretti vs. El Hijo del Vikingo, Komander, and Penta El Zero Miedo in a six man tag team match		
Five Alive	January 29, 2024	AEW	Norwegian Pearl	Miami, Florida, United States to Cozumel, Quintana Roo, Mexico	Chris Jericho, Mike Bailey, and Paul Wight vs. Don Callis Family (Kyle Fletcher and Powerhouse Hobbs) and Lance Archer		
Six on the Beach	January 31, 2025	AEW; ROH	Norwegian Jewel	Miami, Florida, United States to Puerto Plata, Dominican Republic	Will Ospreay vs. Mansoor	Select matches aired on tape delay as a special episode of Ring of Honor Wrestling on February 13, 2025	
Six on the Beach	February 1, 2025	AEW; ROH	Norwegian Jewel	Miami, Florida, United States to Puerto Plata, Dominican Republic	Daniel Garcia (c) vs. Jay Lethal for the AEW TNT Championship	Select matches aired on tape delay as a special episode of Ring of Honor Wrestling on February 13, 2025	
Six on the Beach	February 1, 2025	AEW; ROH	Norwegian Jewel	Miami, Florida, United States to Puerto Plata, Dominican Republic	Meto (c) vs. Maximus Khan for the CCW Heavyweight Championship	Select matches aired on tape delay as a special episode of Ring of Honor Wrestling on February 13, 2025	
Six on the Beach	February 2, 2025	AEW; ROH	Norwegian Jewel	Miami, Florida, United States to Puerto Plata, Dominican Republic	Komander (c) vs. Nick Wayne for the ROH World Television Championship	Select matches aired on tape delay as a special episode of Ring of Honor Wrestling on February 13, 2025	
Six on the Beach	February 3, 2025	AEW; ROH	Norwegian Jewel	Miami, Florida, United States to Puerto Plata, Dominican Republic	Daniel Garcia, Mark Briscoe, and Will Ospreay vs. Nick Wayne and The Righteous (Dutch and Vincent) in a six man tag team match	Select matches aired on tape delay as a special episode of Ring of Honor Wrestling on February 13, 2025	
Six on the Beach	February 3, 2025	AEW; ROH	Norwegian Jewel	Miami, Florida, United States to Puerto Plata, Dominican Republic	Real1 and The Learning Tree (Big Bill, Bryan Keith, and Chris Jericho) vs. Grizzled Young Veterans (James Drake and Zack Gibson) and MxM Collection (Mansoor and Mason Madden) in an eight man tag team match	Select matches aired on tape delay as a special episode of Ring of Honor Wrestling on February 13, 2025	
Seventh Cruise of a Seventh Cruise	November 7, 2026	AEW	Norwegian Jewel	Miami, Florida, United States to Bimini, Bahamas	Andrade El Idolo (c) vs. Tommaso Ciampa for the AEW National Championship	Aired live as a special episode of Collision	
Seventh Cruise of a Seventh Cruise	November 8, 2026	AEW; ROH	Norwegian Jewel	Miami, Florida, United States to Bimini, Bahamas	Death Riders (Daniel Garcia and Gabe Kidd) vs. Grizzled Young Veterans (James Drake and Zack Gibson)	Select matches aired on tape delay as a special episode of Ring of Honor Wrestling	
Seventh Cruise of a Seventh Cruise	November 9, 2026	AEW; ROH	Norwegian Jewel	Miami, Florida, United States to Bimini, Bahamas	Dalton Castle, The Outrunners (Truth Magnum and Turbo Floyd), and Willow Nightingale vs. Shane Taylor Promotions (Carlie Bravo, Shane Taylor, Shawn Dean and Trish Adora) (w/Christyan XO) in a Fight Without Honor eight-wrestler tag team match	Select matches aired on tape delay as a special episode of Ring of Honor Wrestling	
Seventh Cruise of a Seventh Cruise	November 10, 2026	AEW; ROH	Norwegian Jewel	Miami, Florida, United States to Bimini, Bahamas	Hardycho (Matt Hardy, Jeff Hardy, and Jericho) vs. Nick Wayne, Jay Lethal, and Blake Christian in a six-man tag team match	Select matches aired on tape delay as a special episode of Ring of Honor Wrestling	
(c) – refers to the champion(s) heading into the match

== Championships ==
Championship	Current champion(s)	Reign	Date won	Days held	Location	Notes	Ref.
Jericho Cruise Oceanic Championship	Romeo Malverde	1	November 10, 2026	11+	United States	Defeated Mo Jabari at Jericho Cruise 2026: Seventh Cruise Of A Seventh Cruise Night 4.	
Jericho Cruise Women's Oceanic Championship	Myla Grace	1	November 10, 2026	11+	United States	Defeated Lacey Lane at Jericho Cruise 2026: Seventh Cruise Of A Seventh Cruise Night 4 to win the vacant title.	

=== Jericho Cruise Oceanic Championship ===
Jericho Cruise Oceanic Championship

Details
- Date established: February 2023
- Current champion: Romeo Malverde
- Date won: November 10, 2026
Statistics
- First champion: Matt Cardona
- Most reigns: Mo Jabari (2 reigns)
- Longest reign: Mo Jabari (488 days)
- Shortest reign: Mo Jabari (11 days)
- Oldest champion: Romeo Malverde (42 years, 194 days)
- Youngest champion: Michael Oku (30 years, 276 days)
- Heaviest champion: Harlon Abbott (220 lb (100 kg))
- Lightest champion: Michael Oku (176 lb (80 kg))

Key
No.	Overall reign number
Reign	Reign number for the specific champion
Days	Number of days held
+	Current reign is changing daily

No.	Champion	Championship change			Reign statistics		Notes	Ref.
No.	Champion	Date	Event	Location	Reign	Days	Notes	Ref.
1	Matt Cardona	June 7, 2023	Jericho Cruise 2023	United States	1	358	Defeated Flip Gordon in a tournament final to become the inaugural champion.	
2	Michael Oku	January 29, 2024	Jericho Cruise 2024	United States	1	371		
3	Mo Jabari	February 3, 2025	Jericho Cruise 2025: Six On The Beach	United States	1	488		
4	Harlon Abbott	June 6, 2026	TTW 4 Year Anniversary	Edmonton, AB, Canada	1	146		
5	Mo Jabari	October 30, 2026	Dungeon Wrestling Wrestleween 4	Calgary, AB, Canada	2	11		
6	Romeo Malverde	November 10, 2026	Jericho Cruise 2026: Seventh Cruise of a Seventh Cruise	United States	1	11+		

=== Combined reigns ===
As of November 21, 2026.

†	Indicates the current champion

Rank	Wrestler	No. of reigns	Combined days
1	Mo Jabari	2	499
2	Michael Oku	1	371
3	Matt Cardona	1	358
4	Harlon Abbott	1	146
5	Romeo Malverde †	1	11+

=== Jericho Cruise Women's Oceanic Championship ===
Jericho Cruise Women's Oceanic Championship

Details
- Date established: February 2025
- Current champion: Myla Grace
- Date won: November 10, 2026
Statistics
- First champion: Natalia Markova
- Most reigns: All titleholders (1 reigns)
- Longest reign: Natalia Markova (643 days)
- Oldest champion: Natalia Markova (36 years, 23 days)
- Youngest champion: Myla Grace (33 years, 195 days)
- Heaviest champion: Natalia Markova (132 lb (60 kg))
- Lightest champion: Myla Grace (114 lb (52 kg))

Key
No.	Overall reign number
Reign	Reign number for the specific champion
Days	Number of days held
+	Current reign is changing daily

No.	Champion	Championship change			Reign statistics		Notes	Ref.
No.	Champion	Date	Event	Location	Reign	Days	Notes	Ref.
1	Natalia Markova	February 3, 2025	Jericho Cruise 2025: Six On The Beach	United States	1	643	Defeated Tasha Steelz in a tournament final to become the inaugural champion.	
—	Vacated	November 8, 2026	—	—	—	—		
2	Myla Grace	November 10, 2026	Jericho Cruise 2026: Seventh Cruise of a Seventh Cruise	United States	1	11+	Defeated Lacey Lane to win the vacant title.	
