= Raw (Ra album) =

Live album by Ra
- Released: October 24, 2006
- Recorded: The Machine Shop in Flint, Michigan
- Genre: Alternative metal; hard rock
- Length: 62:45
- Label: Cement Shoes
- Producer: Sahaj Ticotin

Ra chronology
Duality (2005)	Raw (2006)	Black Sun (2008)

Singles from Raw
- 1. "Don't Turn Away" Released: 2006

Professional ratings
Review scores
Source	Rating
AllMusic	4/5 stars
antiMusic	4/5 stars
TuneLab Music	8/10 stars
Bullz-Eye	4/5 stars

Raw is a 2006 live album by American alternative metal band Ra. Songs are taken from their former albums From One, and Duality. "Don't Turn Away" is a newly recorded track and is also included in their 2008 album Black Sun.

Vocalist Sahaj Ticotin broke the record for the longest single note for a male vocalist in a song, having held a high B for 24 seconds during "Skorn". Sahaj overtook the previous record of 20.2 seconds which was held by Morten Harket in his song "Summer Moved On". Ra released an e-card on September 12, 2006, where the song "Don't Turn Away" could be streamed. The entire album of Raw can be downloaded for free on Ra's website.

== Track listing ==
No.	Title	Length
1.	"Fallen Angels"	5:38
2.	"Rectifier"	5:02
3.	"Only"	4:13
4.	"Violator"	5:34
5.	"Superman"	4:28
6.	"I Lost Everything Today"	3:56
7.	"Tell Me"	4:15
8.	"Sky"	6:05
9.	"The Only One"	3:42
10.	"Do You Call My Name"	8:03
11.	"Skorn"	9:01
12.	"Don't Turn Away" (Studio Version)	4:08

== Credits ==
- Ben Carroll—guitar
- P.J. Farley—bass
- Andy Ryan—drums
- Sahaj Ticotin—vocals, guitar, engineer & mixing (12)
- Stephen Pellitier—engineer
- Jason Cosaro—engineer (12)
- Andy Johns—mixing
- Krystal Bakkila and the fans—photo credits
- Chris Kabisch—art direction and design
