= One (Ra EP) =

One EP

EP by Ra
- Released: 2000
- Recorded: Avatar Studios, Manhattan
- Genre: Alternative metal; nu metal
- Label: Independent
- Producer: Rupert Hines; Sahaj

Ra chronology
One EP (2000)	From One (2002)

Alternative cover
- Alternative cover only found on Ra's official band site.

One is Ra's debut EP and was released in 2000. The songs "End of Days" and "What I Am" were not included on their debut album From One. However, "What I Am" is included in their album Black Sheep.

One was only sold (for $10) during Ra's concerts, and soon went out of circulation when Ra's debut album From One hit stores. The EP is still available through Ra's online merchandise store, but is otherwise a rare collector's item.

In an interview with SoundCheck Magazine, Sahaj Ticotin (the lead singer) talked about One:

"It just says Ra One since it's the first CD. The theme is kind of a double meaning. The record is primarily about loneliness…different variations of loneliness. So I named it One also because of that".

== Track listing ==
All tracks are written by Sahaj Ticotin, except where noted.

No.	Title	Writer(s)	Length
1.	"Do You Call My Name"	Ticotin; Skoota Warner	5:20
2.	"Rectifier"		4:31
3.	"Fallen Rock Zone"		4:32
4.	"End of Days"		5:32
5.	"Walking and Thinking"		3:30
6.	"Sky"	Ticotin; Alain Johanness	4:57
7.	"What I Am" (bonus track)		5:01

== Personnel ==
- Sahaj – lead vocals, guitar
- Sean Corcoran – bass, backing vocals
- Skoota Warner – drums
