= Ticotin =

Ticotin is a surname. Notable people with the surname include:

- Daniel Ticotin (born 1969), American musician, known as Sahaj (musician)
- Rachel Ticotin (born 1958), American actress
- Nancy Ticotin (born 1957), American actress, sister of Rachel
