= Critical Mass (Ra album) =

Studio album by Ra
- Released: October 24, 2013
- Recorded: Sahaja Music Records
- Genre: Alternative metal; hard rock; progressive rock
- Length: 54:05
- Label: Sahaja Music Records
- Producer: Sahaj

Ra chronology
Black Sheep (2009)	Critical Mass (2013)	Intercorrupted (2021)

Singles from Critical Mass
- 1. "SuperMegaDubstep" Released: July 2, 2013; 2. "Awake" Released: December 16, 2013

Professional ratings
Review scores
Source	Rating
Cryptic Rock	4/5 stars
Rock and Roll	Positive
Unsung Melody	8/10

Critical Mass is the fourth studio album issued by the alternative metal band Ra. It was the group's first studio album publicly funded via Kickstarter. The album was made available for streaming via Loudwire on October 7, 2013.

This is the band's first album since its debut From One to feature drummer Skoota Warner.

== Track listing ==
All tracks are written by Sahaj Ticotin.

No.	Title	Length
1.	"Brutiful"	5:19
2.	"Awake"	3:55
3.	"SuperMegaDubstep"	3:47
4.	"It's All Over Now"	4:47
5.	"Anything U Want"	3:51
6.	"Won't Be Home Tonight"	4:14
7.	"Running Blind"	4:46
8.	"A Hollow Glow"	2:06
9.	"Ecstacy"	3:49
10.	"Tragic Empire" (featuring Travis Montgomery)	3:24
11.	"The Voice Inside My Head"	4:37
12.	"Through the Valley"	5:50
13.	"Crawling to the Sky"	3:31

== Personnel ==
Ra

- Sahaj Ticotin – lead vocals, guitar, production, engineer, mixing
- Ben Carroll – guitar, backing vocals
- P.J. Farley – bass, backing vocals
- Skoota Warner – drums

Additional

- Travis Montgomery – guitar (track 10)
- Paul Logus – mastering
