= Sea of Honor =

Professional wrestling pay-per-view

- Promotion: Ring of Honor (ROH)
- Date: October 27–31, 2018 (aired November 3)
- City: Miami, Florida to Nassau, Bahamas
- Venue: Norwegian Jade
- Attendance: est. 2,500
- Tagline: Combining the worlds of rock and wrestling with a once in a lifetime amazing vacation experience

Pay-per-view chronology
← Previous; Glory By Honor XVI	Next → Survival of the Fittest

Chris Jericho's Rock 'N' Wrestling Rager at Sea chronology
← Previous; First	Next → Chris Jericho's Rock 'N' Wrestling Rager at Sea; Part Deux: Second Wave

Ring of Honor Sea chronology
← Previous; First	Next → 2025

Sea of Honor was a professional wrestling and rock music-themed Norwegian Jade cruise that sailed from October 27 to October 31, 2018, hosted by Chris Jericho. Nights two, three, and four were aired on tape delay as a pay-per-view event on November 3, 2018 on FITE TV and Honor Club.

== Production ==
Other on-screen personnel
Role	Name
Guest Cruise director	SoCal Val
Commentators	Colt Cabana
Commentators	Jay Lethal
Hosts
Hosts	Jim Ross
Hosts	Jerry Lawler

=== Storylines ===
Sea of Honor featured thirty two different multiple professional wrestling matches in four different nights that involved different wrestlers from pre-existing scripted feuds and storylines. Wrestlers were portrayed as either villains or heroes in the scripted events that built tension and culminated in a wrestling match involving four proportions of the show (In four separate nights.) instead of one.

The shows main event featured four different main events in four different nights. Night one involves The Young Bucks (Matt Jackson and Nick Jackson) vs. The Latin American Exchange (Santana and Ortiz), night 2 involves Jay Lethal vs. Frankie Kazarian vs. Kenny King vs. Matt Taven in a Four Corners Survival match, night 3 involves The Bullet Club (Cody, Kenny Omega and Marty Scurll) vs. Alpha Club (Chris Jericho, Matt Jackson and Nick Jackson) in a Six-man tag team match and night 4 involves The Mushroom Kingdom (Bowser (Cody), Luigi (Matt Jackson), Mario (Nick Jackson), Wario (Marty Scurll) and Yoshi (Hangman Page)) vs. Team Impact Wrestling (Brian Cage, Johnny Impact, Ortiz, Sami Callihan and Santana) in a Ten-man tag team match.

While the women's version of the main event match is Sumie Sakai vs. Jenny Rose for the Women of Honor World Championship.

== Results ==
Night 1

Night 1 (October 27)
No.	Results	Stipulations
1	Christopher Daniels defeated Delirious	Sea of Honor Tournament First Round match
2	Dalton Castle defeated Matt Taven by disqualification	Sea of Honor Tournament First Round match
3	Marty Scurll defeated Rhett Titus	Sea of Honor Tournament First Round match
4	Brandi Rhodes defeated Jenny Rose	Singles match with Mandy Leon as Special Guest Referee
5	Mark Briscoe defeated Will Ferrara	Sea of Honor Tournament First Round match
6	Flip Gordon defeated Silas Young	Sea of Honor Tournament First Round match
7	"Hangman" Adam Page defeated Frankie Kazarian	Sea of Honor Tournament First Round match
8	Cheeseburger defeated Beer City Bruiser	Sea of Honor Tournament First Round match
9	Jay Briscoe defeated Kenny King	Sea of Honor Tournament First Round match
10	The Young Bucks (Matt Jackson and Nick Jackson) defeated The Latin American Exchange (Santana and Ortiz)	Tag team match

Night 2

Night 2 (October 28)
No.	Results	Stipulations	Times
1	Dalton Castle defeated Christopher Daniels	Sea of Honor Tournament Quarterfinals match	7:00
2	Flip Gordon defeated Marty Scurll	Sea of Honor Tournament Quarterfinals match	11:24
3	Jay Briscoe defeated Cheeseburger	Sea of Honor Tournament Quarterfinals match	6:40
4	Mark Briscoe defeated "Hangman" Adam Page	Sea of Honor Tournament Quarterfinals match	10:30
5	Silas Young and Beer City Bruiser defeated The Dawgs (Rhett Titus and Will Ferrara)	Tag team match	—
6	Jenny Rose and Mandy Leon defeated Brandi Rhodes and Sumie Sakai	Tag team match	—
7	Cody defeated Delirious	Singles match	—
8	Jay Lethal defeated Frankie Kazarian, Kenny King and Matt Taven	Four Corners Survival match	—

Night 3

Night 3 (October 29)
No.	Results	Stipulations	Times
1	Flip Gordon defeated Dalton Castle	Sea of Honor Tournament Semifinals match	10:20
2	Jay Briscoe defeated Mark Briscoe	Sea of Honor Tournament Semifinals match	12:01
3	Sumie Sakai (c) defeated Jenny Rose	Singles match for the ROH Women of Honor World Championship	—
4	The Addiction (Christopher Daniels and Frankie Kazarian) defeated Cheeseburger and Jay Lethal, and Silas Young and Beer City Bruiser and The Dawgs (Rhett Titus and Will Ferrara)	Four Corners survival tag team match	—
5	Sami Callihan defeated Marty Scurll	Singles match	—
6	Brandi Rhodes and Flip Gordon defeated Cheeseburger and Sumie Sakai	Intergender tag team match	—
7	"Hangman" Adam Page defeated Kenny King and Scorpio Sky	Three-way match	—
8	Bullet Club (Cody, Kenny Omega and Marty Scurll) defeated Alpha Club (Chris Jericho, Matt Jackson and Nick Jackson)	Six-man tag team match	23:10
(c) / – the champion(s) heading into the match

Night 4

Night 4 (October 30)
No.	Results	Stipulations	Times
1	Matt Taven defeated Delirious	Kiss My Foot match	—
2	Jay Lethal (c) defeated Scorpio Sky	Singles match for the ROH World Championship	—
3	Flip Gordon defeated Jay Briscoe	Sea of Honor Tournament Finals	11:50
4	The Addiction (Christopher Daniels and Frankie Kazarian) defeated ??? and ???	Tag team match	—
5	James Ellsworth (c) defeated Jenny Rose	Singles match for the World Intergender Championship	—
6	Mushroom Kingdom (Bowser (Cody), Luigi (Matt Jackson), Mario (Nick Jackson), Wario (Marty Scurll) and Yoshi (Hangman Page)) vs. Team Impact Wrestling (Brian Cage, Johnny Impact, Ortiz, Sami Callihan and Santana) ended in a no contest	Ten-man tag team match	—
(c) / – the champion(s) heading into the match

== Cast ==
=== Guests ===
- Chris Jericho

==== Ring of Honor ====
- Kenny Omega
- The Young Bucks
- Dalton Castle
- Marty Scurll
- The Briscoes
- Brandi Rhodes
- Mandy Leon
- Adam Page
- Jay Lethal
- Matt Taven
- Christopher Daniels
- Frankie Kazarian
- Flip Gordon
- Kenny King
- Silas Young
- Beer City Bruiser
- Delirious
- Cheeseburger
- Scorpio Sky
- Rhett Titus
- Will Ferrara
- Sumie Sakai
- Cody
- Jenny Rose

==== Impact Wrestling ====
- Sami Callihan
- Johnny Impact
- Brian Cage
- Melissa Santos

==== Wrestling ====
- Jim Ross
- Jerry Lawler
- Diamond Dallas Page
- Mick Foley
- Ricky Steamboat
- Rey Mysterio
- Raven
- James Ellsworth
- SoCal Val (Guest Cruise Director)
- Noelle Foley
- Pat Patterson

==== Podcasts ====
- Talk Is Jericho
- Busted Open Radio (Dave LaGreca and Bubba Ray Dudley)
- Keepin It 100 Podcast (Konnan, Disco Inferno, and Hurricane Helms)
- Killing the Town Podcast (Cyrus and Paul Lazenby)
- Unprofessional Wrestling Shows (Colt Cabana and Marty DeRosa)
- Beyond the Darkness (Dave Schrader)
- What Say You? (Sal Vulcano and Brian Quinn)

==== Music ====
- Corey Taylor
- Phil Campbell and the Bastard Sons
- Kyng
- Fozzy
- The Stir
- Cherry Bombs
- Shoot to Thrill
- Blizzard of Ozzy
- Dave Spivak Project
- Papa Buck

==== Comedy ====
- Craig Gass
- Brad Williams
