= The Elite (professional wrestling) =

Professional wrestling stable

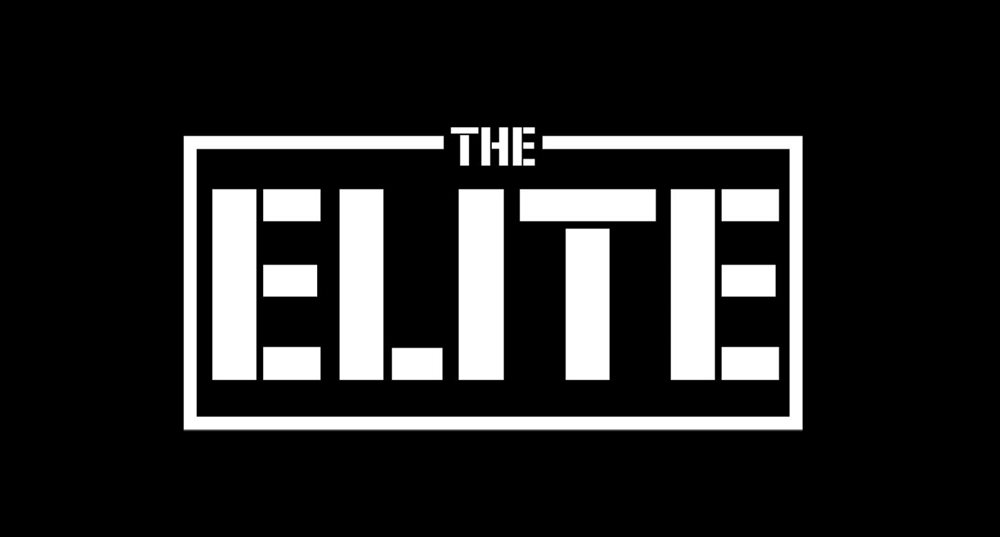

Stable
- Name: The Elite
- Leader: Kenny Omega (I)
- Members: Matt Jackson (II); Nick Jackson (II); Jack Perry
- Former members: See below
- Debut: January 5, 2016
- Years active: 2016–present

The Elite is a professional wrestling stable that predominantly appears in the American professional wrestling promotion All Elite Wrestling (AEW), for which the promotion is partially named after. The stable consists of leader Kenny Omega, Jack Perry, and The Young Bucks (Matt Jackson and Nick Jackson).

The Elite was originally formed in January 2016 by Omega, Nick and Matt as a trio acting as a sub-group within Bullet Club, a larger stable of which Omega was the leader. Together, the trio captured the NEVER Openweight 6-Man Tag Team Championship twice later that year, but continued their alliance beyond that point, with The Young Bucks notably acting as valets for Omega in his singles career. Other titles won by members as part of the stable include the IWGP Heavyweight Championship, IWGP Intercontinental Championship, IWGP United States Heavyweight Championship, and AAA Mega Championship for Omega, while The Young Bucks won the IWGP Junior Heavyweight Tag Team Championship seven times, the IWGP Heavyweight Tag Team Championship once, the ROH World Tag Team Championship three times, and the AAA World Tag Team Championship one time.

In October 2018, after a lengthy internal feud within Bullet Club, Omega and The Young Bucks' 'Elite' faction left the group. Cody Rhodes, Adam Page, and Marty Scurll, all of whom had sided with Omega during the feud, also left to formally join The Elite on October 30, 2018, alongside Omega's tag partner in Golden☆Lovers, Kota Ibushi, making it a full-scale stable. During the following three months, the members of The Elite would leave most of their other promotions to work almost exclusively with AEW, minus Scurll and Ibushi, who chose to remain in Ring of Honor and New Japan Pro-Wrestling, respectively, leaving the stable. The five, who were instrumental in the creation of the company and hold positions as executive vice presidents (except for Page), would play a pivotal role in AEW, both on-screen and off-screen.

Cody Rhodes would eventually leave the group to focus on his own Nightmare Family stable; Page would also leave following a falling out with Omega and the Bucks. In December 2020, Don Callis, an executive vice president of Impact Wrestling, came to AEW as a guest of Omega and aided him in winning the AEW World Championship. Omega then began making appearances in Impact Wrestling alongside Callis, eventually winning the Impact World Championship, and reestablished ties with past Bullet Club teammates and Impact wrestlers Doc Gallows and Karl Anderson. Omega would claim to have "reformed the old Bullet Club", and once the group merged with the trio of remaining Elite members, Callis would take credit for "reforming" The Elite, which he called a "new Elite" and later dub "The Super Elite". Following the dissolution of AEW and Impact's partnership, Callis remained with The Elite while Luke Gallows and Karl Anderson quietly left, and were replaced in the group by Adam Cole, Bobby Fish, and Kyle O'Reilly, who all left in August 2022. Throughout this time, The Elite would collectively win the AEW World Tag Team Championship three times, once by Omega with Page and a record-setting two-times by The Young Bucks. The Elite would also become the inaugural AEW World Trios Champions in September 2022. Due to a common feud with the Blackpool Combat Club, Page rejoined the stable in May 2023. In July 2023, Kota Ibushi would re-join the group at Blood and Guts. In March 2024, Omega was fired and Page was suspended by the Bucks from the group, with Kazuchika Okada also joining the group at the same time. In April 2024, Jack Perry joined the group. Okada left the group in July 2025 to join the Don Callis Family, whilst Perry would leave the group later that September. The Young Bucks would later reunite with Omega in November 2025.

== Background ==
Prior to the 2016 formation of The Elite, Kenny Omega and The Young Bucks (Matt Jackson and Nick Jackson) had known each other for years. They originally met in Japan in 2008, when Omega was on his first tour with the DDT Pro-Wrestling (DDT) promotion and The Young Bucks were on their first tour with the Dragon Gate promotion. They became close friends after later meetings in other promotions, including California promotion Pro Wrestling Guerrilla (PWG). Omega has stated that the three had always thought that they shared the same brain, having the same thoughts about what a wrestling match should be. Matt Jackson has described the creative chemistry between the three as unlike anything they have experienced before, adding "There's magic there".

Omega, who has called The Young Bucks his best friends and closest allies in professional wrestling, has stated that the three have "an open line of communication sending messages all day". The Elite was created as a result of one of these "think-tank sessions", during which the three came up with the idea of filming their moments away from the ring and sharing them with their fans. These moments, some only loosely tied to professional wrestling, were used to create Being The Elite, a show produced by The Young Bucks and released on both Twitter and YouTube.

In 2016, the three were affiliated with each other in NJPW as members of Bullet Club, but in Omega's words they felt that the stable had been watered down and wanted to create something new. Omega claimed that whenever people were saying that Bullet Club had been doing "some really cool stuff", they were in fact always talking about the three of them and not the other members of the stable. Wanting to be together both in the ring and outside of it, the three decided to go full-bore as The Elite. They had come up with the name The Elite as a joke years earlier, when trying to come up with a list of the most elite wrestlers in the world. Omega stated that he and The Young Bucks wanted to push themselves as The Elite, but accepted if NJPW continued calling them Bullet Club "in parentheses" as the stable was their "cash cow" and a "pop-culture phenomenon". Omega has described The Elite as "a place you can go to watch the most ridiculous and entertaining stuff in pro wrestling".

== History ==
=== New Japan Pro-Wrestling and Ring of Honor (2016–2019) ===
==== Formation (2016–2017) ====
On January 5, 2016, Omega took over the Bullet Club as its new leader, turning its members, including The Young Bucks, on previous figurehead A.J. Styles, kicking him out of the group. According to The Young Bucks, they and Omega created The Elite that night without ever asking permission from NJPW bookers. After the rest of Bullet Club had left the ring after turning on Styles, Omega allegedly asked The Young Bucks if just the three of them should return to the ring to continue the attack on Styles as a "signal to the audience that [they were] the three guys". The three agreed to return to the ring and The Elite was born.

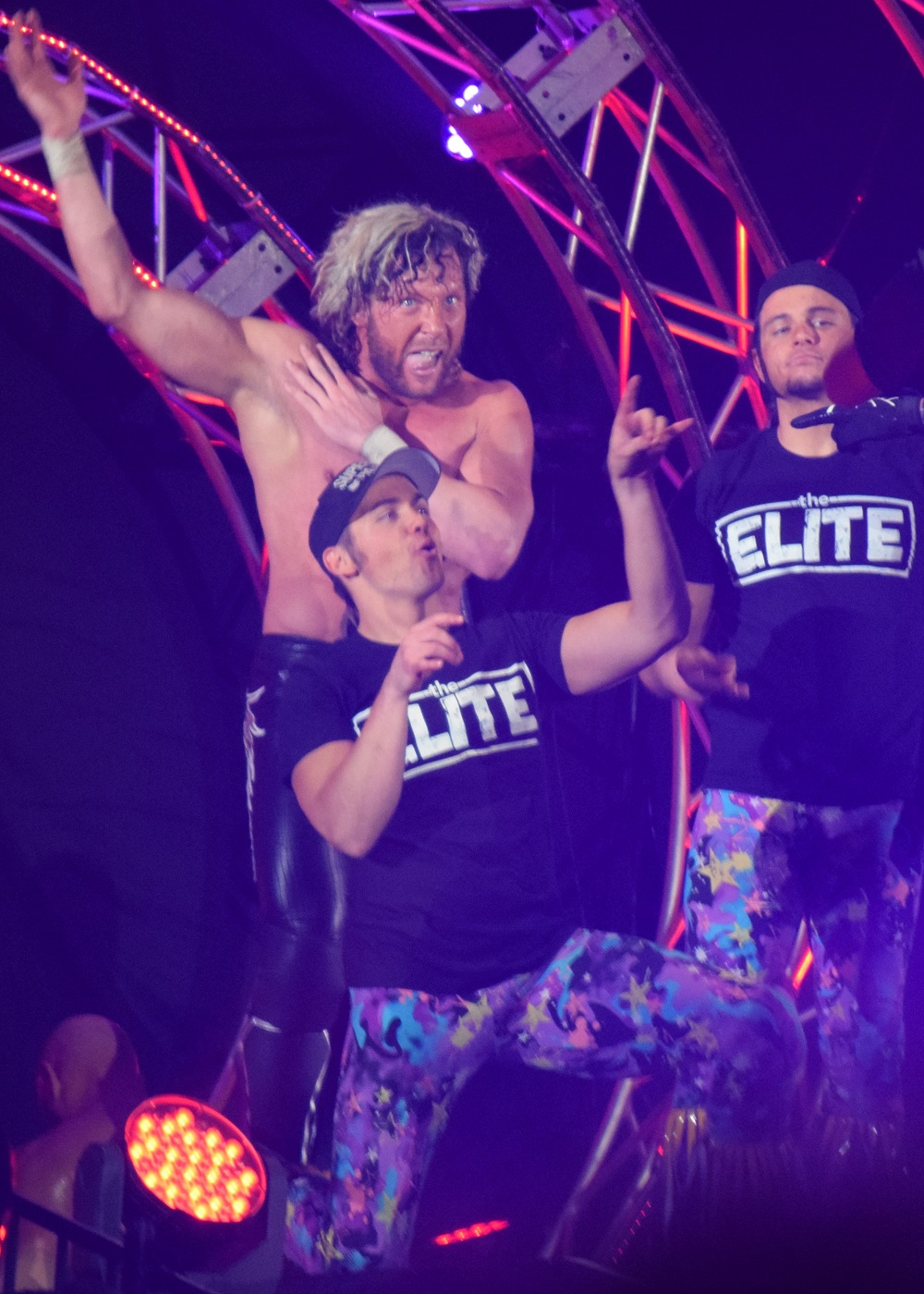
The founding members of the group, Kenny Omega and The Young Bucks (Matt Jackson and Nick Jackson)

During the first months of The Elite's existence, The Young Bucks, who were the reigning IWGP Junior Heavyweight Tag Team Champions when the group was formed, both lost and regained the title while Omega did the same with the IWGP Intercontinental Championship. The Elite won its first title as a trio during the NJPW and Ring of Honor (ROH) co-produced Honor Rising: Japan 2016 show on February 20, when they defeated The Briscoes (Jay Briscoe and Mark Briscoe) and Toru Yano for the NEVER Openweight 6-Man Tag Team Championship. They went on to defend the title in the United States for ROH. The Elite lost the NEVER Openweight 6-Man Tag Team Championship to Hiroshi Tanahashi, Michael Elgin and Yoshitatsu on April 10 at Invasion Attack 2016, only to regain it from them on May 3 at Wrestling Dontaku 2016. Their second reign ended on July 3, when they were defeated by Matt Sydal, Ricochet and Satoshi Kojima.

On August 14, Omega made history by becoming the first non-Japanese wrestler to win NJPW's premier tournament, the G1 Climax, defeating Hirooki Goto in the finals. For the rest of the year, The Elite was largely inactive, with Omega defending his newly won status as the number one contender to the IWGP Heavyweight Championship while The Young Bucks concentrated on tag team matches, winning the ROH World Tag Team Championship in September. On January 4, 2017, The Elite was involved in two championship matches at NJPW's biggest event of the year, Wrestle Kingdom 11 in Tokyo Dome. Early in the show, The Young Bucks lost the IWGP Junior Heavyweight Championship to Roppongi Vice (Beretta and Rocky Romero) while in the main event of the show Omega unsuccessfully challenged Kazuchika Okada for the IWGP Heavyweight Championship. The main event match earned acclaim from journalists and industry veterans with some ranking it among the greatest professional wrestling matches ever.

==== Tension in The Elite and The Golden Elite (2017–2018) ====
After months of inactivity as a trio, The Elite reunited in April 2017 by embarking on a tour of the United Kingdom, during which they wrestled for Discovery Wrestling, Fight Club: Pro, Over the Top Wrestling and Revolution Pro Wrestling. Meanwhile, a storyline had started involving tension between Omega and Bullet Club stablemate Adam Cole, who had formed his own trio named Superkliq with The Young Bucks, who were now caught in the middle of Omega and Cole. The storyline culminated on May 12, when after teasing dissension with Omega they turned on Cole, who was fired from Bullet Club by Omega. On June 11 at Dominion 6.11 in Osaka-jo Hall, The Young Bucks regained the IWGP Junior Heavyweight Tag Team Championship from Roppongi Vice. Over the weekend of July 1 and 2 at G1 Special in USA, Omega defeated Michael Elgin, Jay Lethal and finally Tomohiro Ishii to win an eight-man tournament and become the inaugural IWGP United States Heavyweight Champion. On August 13, The Young Bucks lost the IWGP Junior Heavyweight Tag Team Championship to Funky Future (Ricochet and Ryusuke Taguchi). Later that same day, Omega was defeated in the finals of the 2017 G1 Climax by Tetsuya Naito. On September 2, The Elite returned to the United States, making their debut for The Young Bucks' Southern California home promotion Pro Wrestling Guerrilla (PWG) and defeating Flamita, Penta 0M and Rey Fenix in a six-man tag team main event.

Upon Omega's return to ROH in October 2017, The Elite started defending the ROH World Six-Man Tag Team Championship, which The Young Bucks officially held with Bullet Club stablemate Adam Page.

In January 2018 at The New Beginning in Sapporo, Omega was betrayed by Bullet Club stablemate Cody after shoving Matt Jackson and subsequently reunited with his former Golden Lovers partner Kota Ibushi, leaving the future of The Elite in jeopardy.

On March 28 at Strong Style Evolved, The Young Bucks faced off against the Golden Lovers in a losing effort. After the match, Nick Jackson shook hands and embraced with Omega, but Matt Jackson refused and rolled out of the ring.

During Omega and Cody's bout at Ring of Honor's Supercard of Honor XII on April 7, The Young Bucks interfered and attempted to turn on Cody, but instead accidentally superkicked Omega, causing Cody to get the pinfall victory. After the match, The Young Bucks attempted to explain what had happened to Omega, but he shoved Matt Jackson and left.

On the 100th episode of Being The Elite, "Finale", Omega declared their friendship over and that "There is no Elite" in anger over the Young Bucks' involvement in his match, apparently ending the stable for the time being while Scurll left to pursue a music career and The Young Bucks, Page and Burnard the Business Bear walked out on Cody's invitation to celebrate his win over Omega, leaving him alone in the locker room to ponder what he's done and what it cost.

On June 9 at NJPW's Dominion 6.9 in Osaka-jo Hall, The Young Bucks won the IWGP Heavyweight Tag Team Championship and in the main event Omega won the IWGP Heavyweight Championship. After the match, The Young Bucks came out, congratulated and hugged it out with Omega and Ibushi, thus mergering the Golden Lovers and Elite into a four-man team now named The Golden Elite. At a press conference aired on NJPW World, Omega clarified that going forward "Ibushi is a member of the Elite," but not Bullet Club.

On July 7, 2018, at G1 Special in San Francisco, Cody ended his rivalry with Omega after being attacked by the BC Firing Squad after he unsuccessfully challenged him for the IWGP Heavyweight Championship.

==== Member changes (2018–2019) ====
In July 2018 the Nick and Matt Jackson temporarily fractured from the Bullet Club and formed the "Alpha Club" with Chris Jericho (aka. "The Bucks of Jericho or is it Y2Jackson") which culminated in a one night match on the Jericho Cruise against the Bullet Club (represented by Omega, Cody, and Scurll) to reunite the group. On the Talk is Jericho podcast on October 30 following the match, Matt Jackson confirmed that Cody, Page, and Marty Scurll were now officially in The Elite, and that The Elite had fully split from Bullet Club, ending a civil war between the Bullet Club "OGs" and The Elite.

On November 8, 2018, New Japan Pro-Wrestling announced Page and former Bullet Club stablemate Yujiro Takahashi would represent The Elite at the 2018 World Tag League Tournament.

On December 15, 2018, The Elite (minus Scurll, who remained under contract) officially left ROH, following the Final Battle pay-per-view. They gave a post show speech to the crowd along with Christopher Daniels, Frankie Kazarian, and Scorpio Sky. Scurll went on to form a new faction in Ring of Honor, Villain Enterprises, with the debuting PCO, and Brody King, later adding Flip Gordon.

=== All Elite Wrestling (2019–present) ===
==== AEW beginnings (2019–2020) ====
On January 1, 2019, The Elite announced the formation of a new wrestling promotion, All Elite Wrestling (AEW), as well as a follow-up to All In, called Double or Nothing. Their promotion was revealed to include Cody, The Young Bucks, Hangman Page, Pac, SoCal Uncensored, Joey Janela, Britt Baker, Penelope Ford, Brandi Rhodes, and Chris Jericho, among others. The Young Bucks and Kenny Omega had their first match in AEW as The Elite at AEW Fyter Fest defeating Lucha Brothers and Laredo Kid.

In 2019, The Elite began a feud with Chris Jericho and later his Inner Circle stable, with Omega and Page losing to Jericho at AEW Double or Nothing and AEW All Out respectively.

At AEW Full Gear, Cody unsuccessfully challenged Jericho for the AEW World Championship with the condition that he will never challenge for title again while The Young Bucks lost to Santana and Ortiz. On the January 22, 2020 episode of AEW Dynamite during Chris Jericho's Rock 'N' Wrestling Rager at Sea, Omega and Page defeated SoCal Uncensored (Frankie Kazarian and Scorpio Sky) for the AEW World Tag Team Championship.

On the November 18 episode of Being the Elite, Hangman Page attempted to part ways with the group, leading to months of tension between himself, the Young Bucks (especially Matt Jackson), and his tag partner Omega. Following the March 4, 2020 episode of Dynamite (and shown on the March 8 episode of Being the Elite), Hangman Page formally parted ways with The Elite, but still remained a peripheral member on the verge of permanently leaving.

In a May 2020 interview, Cody Rhodes discussed the status of the Elite's members, stating that the 'OG' Elite (Bucks, Omega) will always determine who joins the group, and that it's "their world" that he's honored to take part in. He also clarified that Hangman Page and Marty Scurll were part of the "expanded universe" of the group, and that Matt Hardy also was an honorary member. On the August 27 episode of AEW Dynamite, Page was officially kicked out of The Elite for costing The Young Bucks a future opportunity to challenge for Page and Omega's World Tag Team Championship.

==== Championship dominance and Super Elite (2020–2022) ====
At Full Gear, The Young Bucks won the AEW World Tag Team Championships in a match against champions FTR. Omega, with assistance from Don Callis defeated Jon Moxley for the AEW World Championship on December 2, 2020. On the December 15, 2020, edition of Impact Wrestling, Omega allied with former Bullet Club teammates Doc Gallows and Karl Anderson, with Omega stating he had "reformed the old Bullet Club." The re-united Bullet Club would continue its presence into the new year, and on the January 6 episode of AEW Dynamite Gallows and Anderson saved Omega from an attack by Jon Moxley, and reunited with the Young Bucks to merge into a five-man group. On the January 11 episode of Being The Elite ("The Band is Back Together"), Matt Hardy asked Matt Jackson "Is the Bullet Club back together?" to which he replied, "it's complicated." On January 15, a match involving 'The Elite' was billed, but last minute was changed by Callis to be Omega and the Good Brothers. NJPW Bullet Club founding member Tama Tonga addressed this faction of former Bullet Club members on Twitter, calling them a "bootleg Bullet Club.".

At Impact Wrestling's Hard to Kill PPV Omega, Anderson, and Gallows defeated Rich Swann, Chris Sabin, and Moose, notably now wearing Bullet Club themed attire. At Beach Break on February 3, Omega, Anderson, and Gallows defeated the team of Jon Moxley, Rey Fenix, and PAC. After the match, Bullet Club member Kenta appeared and launched a sneak attack on current IWGP United States Champion Jon Moxley after Moxley attacked Kenny Omega. After the show, Omega said he would team with Kenta in a match against Moxley and Lance Archer.

In April 2021, The Young Bucks, who had been wary of Omega's relationship with Callis, Gallows, and Anderson, would cement their commitment to Omega by turning on Jon Moxley during a six-man tag team match on Dynamite, when they wrestled against Omega, Anderson, and Gallows.

In September 2021, at All Out, The Young Bucks lost their AEW world tag team championships to Lucha Brothers in a Steel Cage. After Omega retained the AEW World championship against Christian Cage in a title match in the main event, the Elite came out to attack Cage. Jurassic Express ran in to aid Cage, but was outnumbered. The Elite was interrupted by the debuting Adam Cole, who hit the superkick to Jungle Boy, joining the Elite. As the Elite was about to end the show, the debuting Bryan Danielson attacked the Elite, aiding Cage and Jurassic Express. Danielson, Cage and Jurassic Express stood tall at the end of the show.

In October 2021, following Impact's Bound for Glory pay-per-view, it was reported that the partnership between AEW and Impact had ended, and with that, Gallows and Anderson quietly were removed from the Elite. After losing the AEW World Championship to Adam Page at Full Gear, Omega announced on the following Dynamite that he would be taking a leave of absence, leaving The Young Bucks to "hold down the fort". Cole, however, would add former Undisputed Era stablemates Bobby Fish and Kyle O'Reilly to the group.

==== Return to original line-up and suspensions (2022–2023) ====
On the July 27, 2022 special episode of Dynamite titled Fight for the Fallen, AEW announced a tournament for the inaugural AEW World Trios Championship, which would culminate at the All Out pay-per-view on September 4, 2022. On the August 3rd episode of Dynamite, Adam Cole made his return from injury with the rest of The Undisputed Elite, stating his intentions to win the new AEW World Trios Championship with Kyle O'Reilly and Bobby Fish. Cole, Fish and O'Reilly then attacked the Young Bucks, turning them face as Cole, Fish, and O'Reilly left The Elite. 'Hangman' Adam Page would save the Bucks from a further attack. Later that night The Bucks would try and thank Page for his help, but were interrupted by The Dark Order. On the August 10th episode of Dynamite, The Young Bucks once again asked Page to join them in the Trios tournament. Page turned down the offer saying he would be in the corner of The Dark Order. On the August 17 episode of Dynamite, the Young Bucks were joined by the returning Omega; his first match in over nine months. Omega and the Bucks advanced to the tournament finals where they defeated the team of the Dark Order (Alex Reynolds and John Silver) and Adam Page to become the inaugural AEW Trios Champions.

On the September 7 episode of Dynamite, due to an altercation with CM Punk after the media scrum following All Out, Tony Khan announced that all members of The Elite were stripped of the AEW World Trios Championship. It was reported earlier from multiple sources that all members of The Elite were suspended because of the altercation.

At Full Gear 2022, The Elite returned in a trios match against Death Triangle for the AEW World Trios Championship, where they were unsuccessful after Rey Fenix used the ring hammer against Kenny Omega to knock him out and win the match. The match at Full Gear would be the start of a best of seven series between The Elite and Death Triangle, which spanned two months and culminated in a seventh and deciding match on the January 11, 2023 edition of Dynamite, where, in a ladder match, The Elite would win the series 4-3, and their second AEW World Trios Championship. The Elite lost the titles to The House of Black at AEW Revolution, ending their second reign at 53 days.

In March, The Elite entered a feud with the Blackpool Combat Club (BCC). The feud began on the March 15 edition of Dynamite where, after failing to regain the AEW World Trios Championship in a three-way match, between House of Black and The Jericho Appreciation Society, The Dark Order and "Hangman" Adam Page began brawling with BCC at ringside, leading to The Elite standing alongside Page, causing the BCC to flee. Despite this, Omega refused to further embrace his former tag-team partner. The feud continued between the sides of Page and The Elite and the BCC over the coming weeks, although Page and Omega were unable to get on the same page, due to the antics of Omega's advisor Don Callis. After Omega successfully defended the IWGP United States Heavyweight Championship against Jeff Cobb on the March 29 edition of Dynamite, the BCC ambushed and attacked Omega, only for BCC member Bryan Danielson to return, seemingly to aid Omega, only to attack him moments later, thus reuniting all 4 members of the Blackpool Combat Club.

The following week, Danielson insulted The Elite and Page, labeling them "amateurs", leading to Page attacking the BCC, only to be beaten down and further attacked by Danielson who gouged Page's eye with a screwdriver. The week after this, BCC (Jon Moxley and Claudio Castagnoli), brutally defeated The Elite's close associates, Brandon Cutler and Michael Nakazawa, leading to Omega and The Young Bucks to return fending off the BCC, with Omega almost impaling Moxley with a screwdriver. On the April 19 edition of Dynamite, BCC attacked The Elite during an in-ring promo, leading to Callis bringing out his protege Konosuke Takeshita to save the group. The following week, Omega and Takeshita defeated The Butcher and The Blade. Following the match, The BCC attacked Omega and The Young Bucks and attempted to recruit Takeshita to their group, although after begging the two factions to stop the brawling, BCC's Wheeler Yuta hit Takeshita with a low blow, before Takeshita was attacked by Danielson with a screwdriver once more. A few days later, a Steel Cage match between Omega and Moxley was announced. During the closing moments of the match on the May 10 episode of Dynamite, Omega pinned Moxley following a One-Winged Angel, only for Don Callis to betray Omega, by breaking up the pin, attacking Omega with a screwdriver, leading to Moxley pinning a knocked out Omega to win the match. The following week, on the May 17 edition of Dynamite Callis attempted to explain his betrayal, but was interrupted by Omega. Shortly after, The BCC attacked Omega before entering the ring, warning Omega that they had won the "war" against The Elite. This led to The Young Bucks and a returning "Hangman" Adam Page coming to the aid of Omega, attacking the BCC. In the ring, Page claimed that he, Omega, and The Young Bucks, were The Elite, leading to him re-joining the stable after a near 3-year absence. Page also challenged the BCC to an Anarchy in the Arena match at Double or Nothing, which was soon after made official for the event. At the event, The Elite lost after Konosuke Takeshita, who had aligned himself with The Elite in recent weeks, attacked Omega, turning heel and ending his brief association with the stable. Page and the Young Bucks would then compete in a ten-man tag team match alongside Eddie Kingston and Tomohiro Ishii against Takeshita, the BCC and Shota Umino at Forbidden Door, which they won. Meanwhile, on the same card, Omega unsuccessfully defended the IWGP United States Heavyweight Championship against Will Ospreay. At Blood & Guts, The Elite, now including Kota Ibushi, defeated the BCC, Takeshita, and Pac in a Blood and Guts match.

In November 2023, tension within The Elite began to rise as Omega formed a tag team with Chris Jericho and defeated The Young Bucks at Full Gear to earn a future shot at the AEW World Tag Team Championship.

==== Changes in formation and various feuds (2024–present) ====
After a brief hiatus, The Young Bucks returned in January 2024 as heels and embraced their roles as AEW executive vice presidents, individually preferring to be called Matthew and Nicholas Jackson.

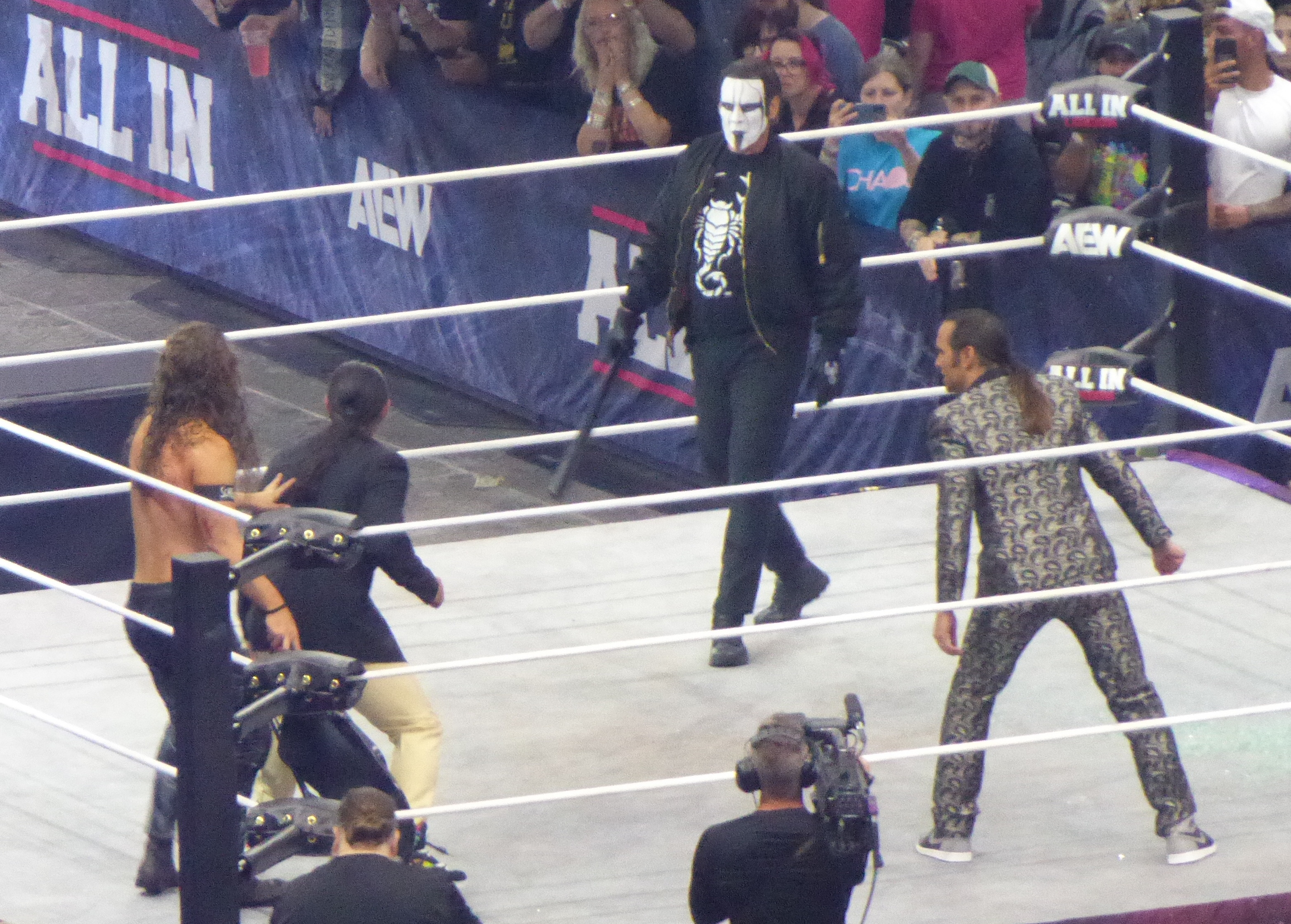
Sting (back) confronting The Elite at All In in August 2024

On the March 6 episode of Dynamite, Kazuchika Okada was announced as having signed full-time with AEW. After this, The Young Bucks revealed that Okada was the newest member of The Elite, with Okada attacking Eddie Kingston, who was confronting The Young Bucks. On the same episode, The Young Bucks took over leadership of The Elite and fired Omega from the group, while Page was suspended. On the March 20 episode of Dynamite, Okada defeated Kingston to win the AEW Continental Championship. At Dynasty, The Young Bucks defeated FTR to win the vacant AEW World Tag Team Championships for a record setting third time in a ladder match, with the help of a returning Jack Perry. On the April 24 episode of Dynamite, The Elite arrived to the arena with Perry, confirming his status in the group. At the end of the episode, The Elite attacked AEW President and CEO Tony Khan. At Double or Nothing on May 26, The Elite defeated Team AEW (Bryan Danielson, Darby Allin, and FTR) in an Anarchy in the Arena match. On June 30 at Forbidden Door, Perry won a six-way ladder match to capture the vacant AEW TNT Championship. Page returned from his suspension on the July 3 episode of Dynamite, defeating Jeff Jarrett in the first round of the Owen Hart Cup. At Blood & Guts on July 24, The Elite were defeated by Team AEW (Darby Allin, Swerve Strickland, and The Acclaimed) in a Blood and Guts match. Afterwards, Page quietly left The Elite for a second time. At Fright Night Dynamite on October 30, The Young Bucks lost their titles to Private Party, and the took an hiatus from wrestling, allowing Nicholas to heal a shoulder injury. On November 23 at Full Gear, Perry lost the TNT Championship to Daniel Garcia.

On April 6, 2025 at Dynasty, The Young Bucks returned and assisted Jon Moxley retain his AEW World Championship against Swerve Strickland, forming an alliance between The Elite and Moxley's stable the Death Riders. On June 11 at Dynamite: Summer Blockbuster, Okada aligned the Don Callis Family during his feud with Kenny Omega and officially joined the group on the June 21 episode of Collision, leaving The Elite in the process, though he would maintain his alliance with The Young Bucks. On July 12 at All In, The Young Bucks were defeated by Will Ospreay and Swerve Strickland. Per the added the stipulations of the match, The Young Bucks were stripped of their executive vice president positions of AEW (in kayfabe). After losing their EVP positions, The Young Bucks went back to being called by their shortened names "Matt and Nick Jackson". Prior to Forbidden Door in August 2025, the Young Bucks revived Being The Elite on a sporadic schedule; in an episode that aired on the week of All Out, Matt Jackson received a package containing a knife and a threatening letter, which was hinted to have been sent by Perry, who himself had posted on social media about his blacksmithing hobby during his hiatus. This episode was followed at All Out on September 20, 2025 with Perry's return; with the help of his former Jurassic Express tag team partner Luchasaurus, he attacked The Young Bucks, and left The Elite, which left The Young Bucks as the two remaining members. At Full Gear on November 22, the Young Bucks teamed with Josh Alexander to defeat Omega and Jurassic Express; post-match, Alexander and the Don Callis Family (Trent Beretta, Rocky Romero and Hechicero) attacked Omega and Jurassic Express until the Young Bucks returned to aid them, thus turning face in the process. The Young Bucks and Omega then embraced, reuniting the original trio of The Elite. On December 15, 2025 at Dynamite: Holiday Bash, Omega and The Young Bucks reunited as The Elite to defeat Konosuke Takeshita, Hechicero, and Kazuchika Okada.

In May 2026, Perry would quietly rejoin The Elite and all four members of the stable would be a part of Jericho's team at Double or Nothing on May 24, 2026, where they defeated Ricochet's team in Stadium Stampede. At Dynamite: Beach Break on July 8, Omega defeated MJF in a Last Chance match to win his second AEW World Championship. At All In on August 30, Omega lost the world title to Will Ospreay, ending his second reign at 53 days, while the Bucks failed to win the AEW World Tag Team Championship from Cage and Cope (Christian Cage and Adam Copeland). On September 26 at All Out, the Bucks defeated Cage and Cope and FTR in a three-way ladder match to win their record-setting fourth AEW World Tag Team Championship. On September 30 at AEW's Tribute to Pac, "Hangman" Adam Page, who was Pac's first ever rival in AEW, rejoined The Elite and teamed with Omega and the Bucks for one night only to defeat The Don Callis Family's Kyle Fletcher, Kevin Knight, Trent Beretta, and Rocky Romero.

=== Return to NJPW (2024–present) ===
On May 11, 2024 at Resurgence, the stable made their return to NJPW, where the Young Bucks and Jack Perry attacked Eddie Kingston.

On January 5, 2025 at Wrestle Dynasty, The Young Bucks defeated United Empire (Great-O-Khan and Jeff Cobb) and Los Ingobernables de Japon (Tetsuya Naito and Hiromu Takahashi) to win the IWGP Tag Team Championship for the second time, while Perry unsuccessfully challenged Yota Tsuji for the IWGP Global Heavyweight Championship. On February 11 at The New Beginning in Osaka, The Young Bucks lost their titles to Naito and Takahashi, ending their reign at 37 days.

On October 12, 2026 at King of Pro-Wrestling, Omega made his NJPW return and attacked Boltin Oleg and Yota Tsuji before subsequently proposing a three-way match at Power Struggle, where if Omega won, he would earn an IWGP Heavyweight Championship match against Tsuji at Wrestle Kingdom 21; Omega subsequently won the match.

== Being The Elite ==
Being The Elite

YouTube information
- Channel: Being The Elite
- Years active: 2016–2022 (original run); 2023–2024 (Being the Dark Order); 2025–present (revival)
- Genre: Entertainment/Lifestyle
- Subscribers: 497 thousand
- Views: 106 million
- Last updated: 17 March 2026

Being The Elite, also known as BTE, debuted on YouTube in May 2016 and has since aired on average once or twice a week. The show was originally shot and edited entirely on an iPhone with the members of The Elite holding complete creative control over the content. As the show gained popularity, the production process changed to include nicer cameras as well as editing being done on a computer. Originally intended as a promotional vehicle and a video journal of The Young Bucks & Kenny Omega's life on the road, it has since evolved into a hybrid that also includes skits and storyline developments involving both The Elite and Bullet Club. In early 2017, Being The Elite provided the background for an angle that culminated at War of the Worlds in May with The Elite turning on Adam Cole and kicking him out of Bullet Club. While ROH had previously shown that there was tension between Cole and The Young Bucks, Being The Elite went deeper into the background for the angle with a storyline that involved tension between Cole and Omega and their fight for The Young Bucks' loyalty while also introducing Scurll, who would go on to become Cole's replacement in Bullet Club.

On January 1, 2019, an episode of Being The Elite was used to announce the formation of a new wrestling promotion, All Elite Wrestling (AEW), as well as a follow-up to All In, called Double or Nothing. Since the formation of AEW, the show has also advanced AEW storylines, debuted new signees, and promoted upcoming AEW shows.

Being the Elite went on hiatus on September 12, 2022, after The Elite's suspension due to their altercation with CM Punk. It returned after they came back at Full Gear. Being the Elite went on hiatus once more after Episode 368 was uploaded on October 9, 2023; Being The Dark Order, focused on the Dark Order stable, debuted on the channel on November 27. In between the last episode of BTE before the hiatus and the debut of Being The Dark Order, various clips from the series were reuploaded as YouTube Shorts in addition to new clips.

The last Being the Dark Order episode was released in August 2024; in that episode, Dark Order member Evil Uno discussed the lack of enthusiasm that the locker room at the time to continuing the series on a weekly basis. After that episode, Being the Elite went on another hiatus until August 2025, at which point the series changed its focus back to following the Young Bucks after their kayfabe loss of their executive vice president positions at All In a month prior.

== Members ==
*	Founding member(s)
I-II	Leader

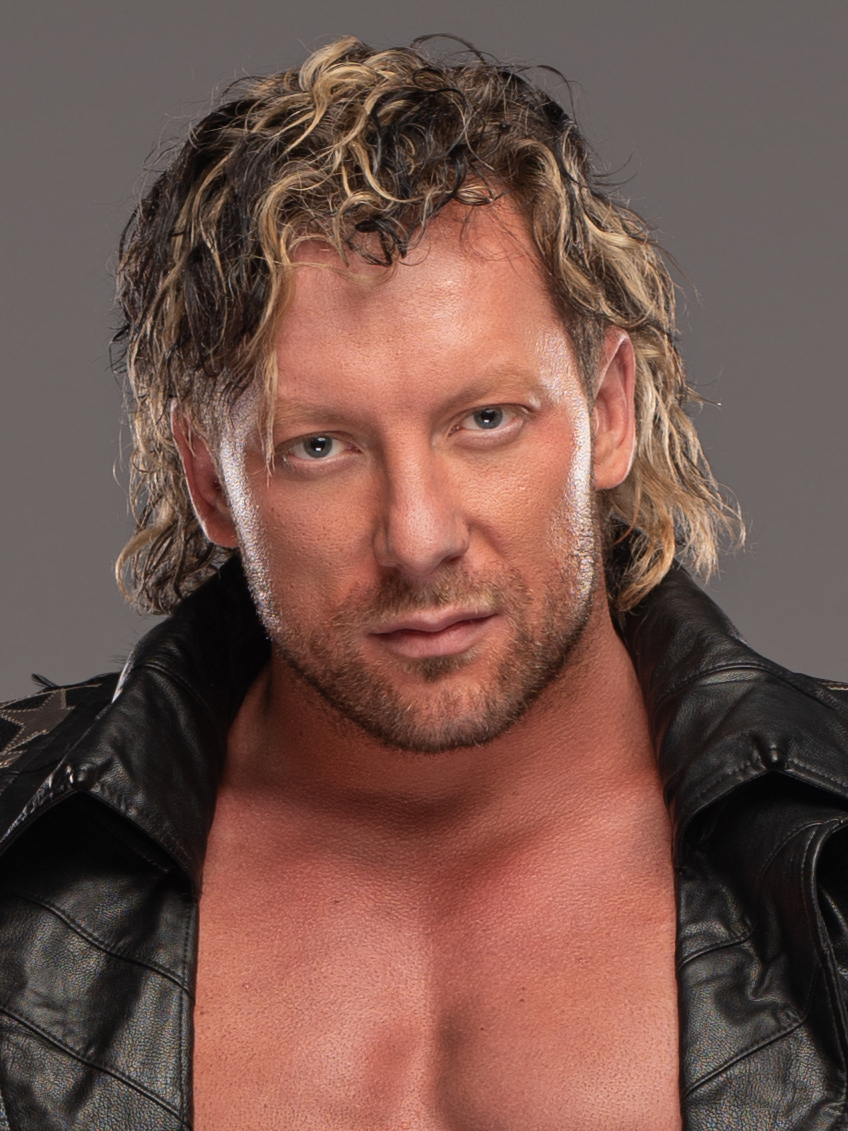
Kenny Omega (I)

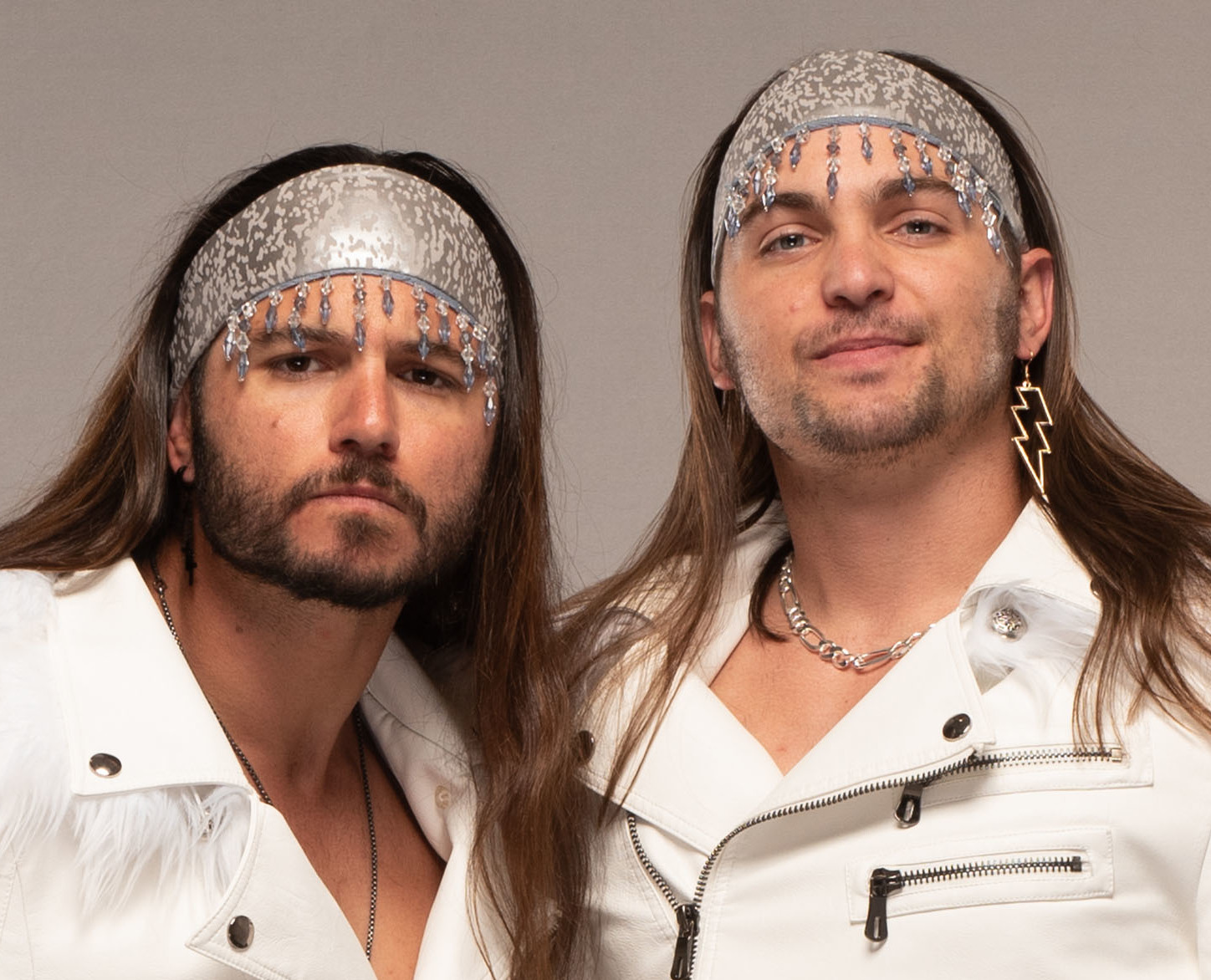
Matt Jackson (left) (II) and Nick Jackson (right) (II)

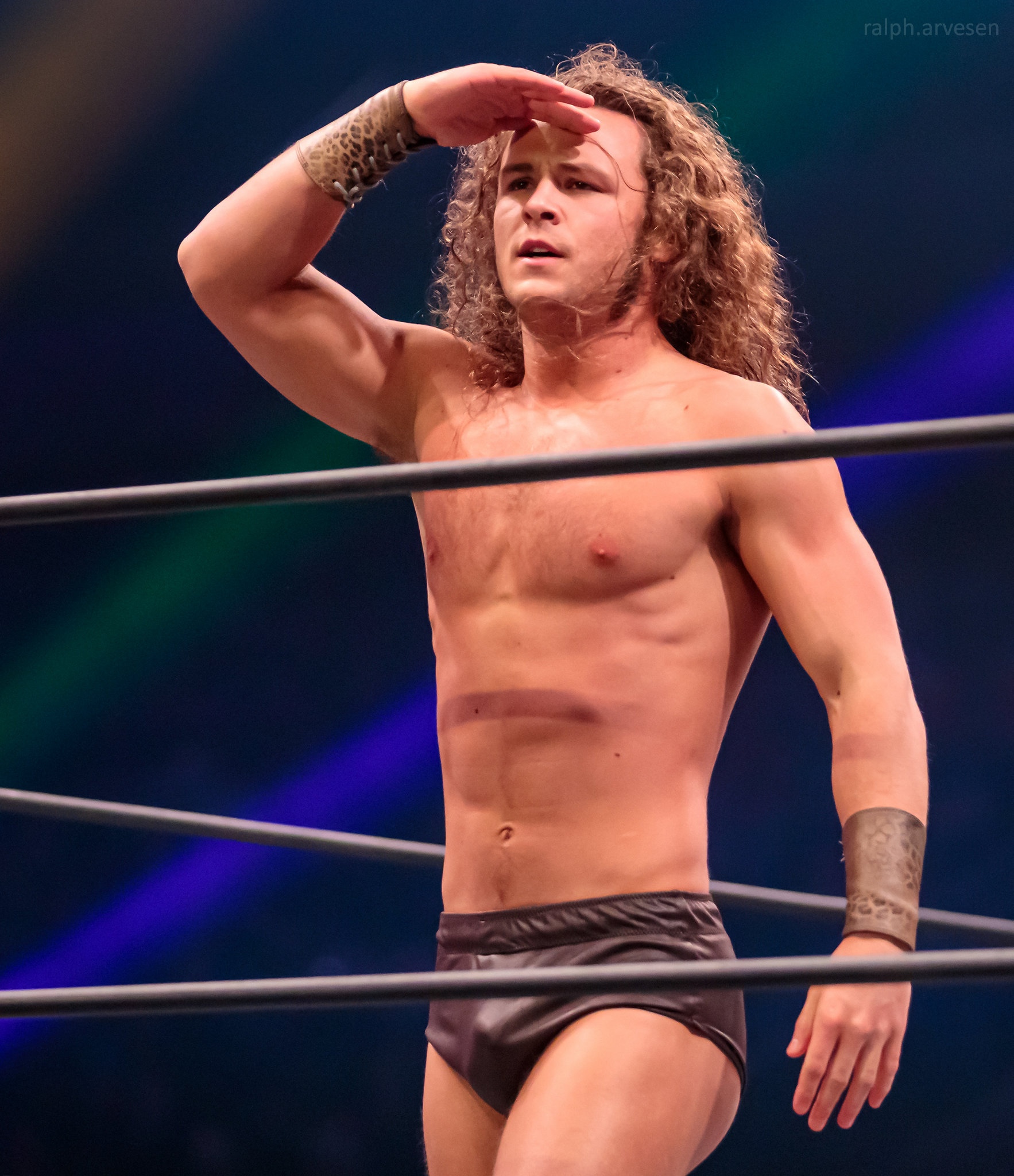
Jack Perry

=== Current ===
Member		Joined
Kenny Omega	*I	January 5, 2016; November 22, 2025
Matt Jackson	*II	January 5, 2016
Nick Jackson	*II	January 5, 2016
Jack Perry		April 24, 2024; May 9, 2026

=== Former ===
Member	Joined	Left
Marty Scurll	October 30, 2018	January 4, 2019 (Note: Never officially left the stable. Date marks his last appearance with the stable.)
Cody Rhodes	October 30, 2018	March 18, 2020
Yujiro Takahashi	October 30, 2018	January 5, 2019
Chase Owens	October 30, 2018	January 5, 2019
Doc Gallows	January 6, 2021	October 23, 2021
Karl Anderson	January 6, 2021	October 23, 2021
Adam Cole	September 5, 2021	August 3, 2022
Bobby Fish	November 10, 2021	August 3, 2022
Kyle O'Reilly	December 22, 2021	August 3, 2022
"Hangman" Adam Page	October 30, 2018; May 17, 2023	August 27, 2020; July 24, 2024
"Hangman" Adam Page	September 30, 2026 (Note: Hangman rejoined the stable for one night only.)	
Kota Ibushi	June 11, 2018; July 12, 2023	January 4, 2019; November 15, 2023
Kazuchika Okada	March 6, 2024	June 21, 2025

== Sub-groups ==
=== Current ===
Affiliate	Members	Tenure (Note: Many of these teams have performed together prior to and subsequent to their association with The Elite; this column lists only when those teams performed as part of the stable.)	Type	Promotion(s)
The Young Bucks	Matt Jackson; Nick Jackson	2016–present	Tag team	AEW; NJPW; ROH; Independent circuit

=== Former ===
Affiliate	Members	Tenure (Note: Many of these teams have performed together prior to and subsequent to their association with The Elite; this column lists only when those teams performed as part of the stable.)	Type	Promotion(s)
The Super Elite (original version)	Kenny Omega; Matt Jackson; Nick Jackson; Doc Gallows; Karl Anderson	2016–2017; 2021	Stable	NJPW; ROH
The Hung Bucks	"Hangman" Adam Page; Matthew Jackson; Nicholas Jackson	2018–2020; 2023–2024 (Note: Page and The Young Bucks had been teaming since 2017, but Page joined The Elite in 2018. Page was kicked out of The Elite in 2020, rejoined in 2023, and was again removed from the group in 2024.)	Trio	NJPW; ROH; AEW
Superkliq	Adam Cole; Matt Jackson; Nick Jackson	2016–2017; 2021–2022	Trio	AEW; NJPW; ROH
Super Villains	Marty Scurll; Matt Jackson; Nick Jackson	2018	Trio	NJPW; ROH; Independent circuit
Luxury Trio	Cody; Kenny Omega; Marty Scurll	2018	Trio	NJPW; ROH
Team All In	Cody; Matt Jackson; Nick Jackson	2018	Trio	ROH
The Originals	Cody; Matt Jackson; Nick Jackson; Hangman Page	2018-2020	Stable	ROH; AEW
Golden☆Lovers	Kenny Omega; Kota Ibushi	2018–2019; 2023	Tag team	NJPW; ROH; AEW
The Golden Elite (original version)	Kenny Omega; Matt Jackson; Nick Jackson; Kota Ibushi	2018–2019; 2023	Stable	AEW; NJPW; Independent circuit
Kenny Omega and Adam Page	Kenny Omega "Hangman" Adam Page	2019–2020; 2023	Tag team	AEW
The Good Brothers	Doc Gallows; Karl Anderson	2016; 2021	Tag team	AEW; Impact; NJPW
The Super Elite (modern version)	Kenny Omega; Matt Jackson; Nick Jackson; Karl Anderson; Luke Gallows; Adam Cole	2021–2022	Stable	AEW; Impact; NJPW; ROH
reDRagon	Bobby Fish; Kyle O'Reilly	2021–2022	Tag team	AEW
Adam Cole and reDRagon	Adam Cole; Bobby Fish; Kyle O'Reilly	2021–2022	Trio	AEW
The Undisputed Elite	Adam Cole; Bobby Fish; Kyle O'Reilly; Matt Jackson; Nick Jackson	2021–2022	Stable	AEW
The Golden Elite (modern version)	Kenny Omega; Matt Jackson; Nick Jackson; Kota Ibushi "Hangman" Adam Page	2023	Stable	AEW

== Championships and accomplishments ==
- 4 Front Wrestling
  - 4FW Junior Heavyweight Championship (1 time) – Omega
- All Elite Wrestling
  - AEW World Championship (2 time) – Omega
  - AEW Continental Championship (1 time) – Okada
  - AEW TNT Championship (1 time) – Perry
  - AEW World Tag Team Championship (5 times, current) – Omega and Page (1), The Young Bucks (4)
  - AEW World Trios Championship (2 times, inaugural) – Omega and The Young Bucks
  - First AEW Triple Crown Champion - Omega
  - AEW World Trios Championship Tournament (2022) – Omega and The Young Bucks
  - Men's Casino Battle Royale (2 times) – Page (2019), O'Reilly (2022)
  - Casino Tag Team Royale (1 time) – The Young Bucks (2022)
  - Continental Classic (2024) – Okada
  - Owen Hart Cup (1 time) – Cole
  - Dynamite Award (1 time)
    - "Bleacher Report PPV Moment of the Year" (2021) – Page, Omega, Hardy, and Young Bucks – Stadium Stampede match (The Elite vs. The Inner Circle) at Double or Nothing
- DDT Pro-Wrestling
  - Ironman Heavymetalweight Championship (2 times) – The Young Bucks (1 times), Brandi Rhodes (1 time)
- Global Force Wrestling
  - GFW NEX*GEN Championship (1 time) – Cody
- Impact Wrestling
  - Impact World Championship (1 time) – Omega
  - Impact World Tag Team Championship (2 times) – The Good Brothers
- Lucha Libre AAA Worldwide
  - AAA Mega Championship (1 time) – Omega
  - AAA World Tag Team Championship (1 time) – The Young Bucks
- New Japan Pro-Wrestling
  - IWGP Heavyweight Championship (1 time) – Omega
  - IWGP Intercontinental Championship (1 time) – Omega
  - IWGP United States Heavyweight Championship (3 times) – Omega (2) and Cody (1)
  - IWGP Junior Heavyweight Championship (1 time) – Scurll
  - IWGP Junior Heavyweight Tag Team Championship (7 times) – The Young Bucks
  - IWGP Tag Team Championship (2 times) – The Young Bucks
  - NEVER Openweight 6-Man Tag Team Championship (3 times) – Omega and The Young Bucks (2), Scurll and The Young Bucks (1)
  - G1 Climax (2016) – Omega
  - IWGP United States Championship Tournament (2017) – Omega
  - Tag Team Turbulence Tournament (2021) – Gallows and Anderson
- National Wrestling Alliance
  - NWA World Heavyweight Championship (1 time) – Cody
- Pro Wrestling Guerrilla
  - PWG World Tag Team Championship (1 time) – The Young Bucks
- Pro Wrestling Illustrated
  - Feud of the Year (2017) Omega vs. Kazuchika Okada
  - Match of the Year (2017) Omega vs Kazuchika Okada on January 4
  - Match of the Year (2018) Omega vs. Kazuchika Okada on June 9
  - Match of the Year (2019) Cody vs Dustin Rhodes on May 25
  - Match of the Year (2020) Omega and Page vs The Young Bucks on February 29
  - Tag Team of the Year (2017, 2018) – The Young Bucks
  - Ranked Omega No. 1 of the top 500 singles wrestlers in the PWI 500 in 2018 and 2021
- Ring of Honor
  - ROH World Heavyweight Championship – Cody (1)
  - ROH World Tag Team Championship (3 times) – The Young Bucks
  - ROH World Six-Man Tag Team Championship (3 times) – Page and The Young Bucks (2), Cody and The Young Bucks (1)
  - ROH World Television Championship (1 time) – Scurll
  - Wrestler of the Year (2017) – Cody
  - Tag Team of the Year (2017) – The Young Bucks
  - Best Final Battle Entrance (2017) – Scurll
  - Breakout Star of the Year (2017) – Page
  - Feud of the Year (2018) Cody vs. Omega
  - Survival of the Fittest (2018) – Scurll
- SoCal Uncensored
  - Match of the Year (2016) The Young Bucks with Adam Cole vs. Matt Sydal, Ricochet and Will Ospreay on September 3
  - Match of the Year (2017) Omega vs. Tomohiro Ishii on July 2
  - Match of the Year (2018) Golden☆Lovers vs. The Young Bucks on March 25
- Sports Illustrated
  - Wrestler of the Year (2017) – Omega
  - Wrestler of the Year (2018) – Cody
- Tokyo Sports
  - Technique Award (2016) – Omega
  - Best Bout Award (2017) Omega vs. Kazuchika Okada on January 4
  - Best Bout Award (2018) Omega vs. Kazuchika Okada on June 9
- Weekly Pro Wrestling
  - Best Bout Award (2016) Omega vs. Tetsuya Naito at G1 Climax 26
  - Best Bout Award (2017) Omega vs. Kazuchika Okada at Wrestle Kingdom 11
  - Best Bout Award (2018) Ibushi vs. Hiroshi Tanahashi at G1 Climax 28
  - Best Foreigner Award (2016–2018) – Omega
- What Culture Pro Wrestling/Defiant Wrestling
  - WCPW/Defiant Championship (1 time) – Scurll
  - WCPW Internet Championship (1 time) – Cody
- World Series Wrestling
  - WSW Tag Team Championship (1 time) – The Young Bucks
  - WSW Tag Team Title Tournament (2018) – The Young Bucks
- Wrestling Observer Newsletter
  - Wrestling Observer Newsletter Hall of Fame (Class of 2020) – Omega
  - Best Pro Wrestling Book (2020) Killing the Business by The Young Bucks
  - Best Wrestling Maneuver (2016–2018, 2020) – Omega (for the One-Winged Angel)
  - Feud of the Year (2017) Omega vs. Kazuchika Okada
  - Feud of the Year (2021) Omega vs. Hangman Page
  - Japan MVP (2018) – Omega
  - United States/Canada MVP (2021) – Omega
  - Most Improved (2018) – Page
  - Most Outstanding Wrestler (2018, 2020) – Omega
  - Pro Wrestling Match of the Year (2017) Omega vs. Kazuchika Okada on January 4
  - Pro Wrestling Match of the Year (2018) Omega vs. Kazuchika Okada on June 9
  - Pro Wrestling Match of the Year (2020) Omega and Page vs The Young Bucks on February 29
  - Pro Wrestling Match of the Year (2021) The Young Bucks vs. the Lucha Brothers on September 5
  - Tag Team of the Year (2016–2018, 2020-2021) – The Young Bucks
  - Tag Team of the Decade (2010s) – The Young Bucks
  - Wrestler of the Year (2018, 2021) – Omega
