= Intercorrupted =

Studio album by Ra
- Released: March 19, 2021
- Recorded: Sahaja Music Records
- Genre: Alternative metal; hard rock
- Length: 50:31
- Label: Wake Up! Music Rocks
- Producer: Sahaj

Ra chronology
Critical Mass (2013)	Intercorrupted (2021)

Singles from Intercorrupted
- 1. "Intercorrupted" Released: October 30, 2020; 2. "Jezebel" Released: March 5, 2021; 3. "Enough" Released: July 16, 2021

Intercorrupted is the fifth studio album issued by American alternative metal band Ra. released on March 19, 2021. "Intercorrupted" was released as a single on October 30, 2020 and "Jezebel" was released as second single on March 5, 2021.

== Track listing ==
All tracks are written by Sahaj Ticotin, except "Enough", written by Ticotin and Dustin Bates.

No.	Title	Length
1.	"Intro"	0:51
2.	"Intercorrupted"	4:02
3.	"Let's Go to Mexico"	3:32
4.	"Loud"	4:00
5.	"Jezebel"	4:49
6.	"Enough" (featuring Dustin Bates of Starset)	3:40
7.	"Divided"	4:50
8.	"Nobody Loves You" (featuring Lajon Witherspoon of Sevendust)	3:46
9.	"Let it Lie"	5:47
10.	"Blind to the Light"	2:59
11.	"I Can't Go On"	4:34
12.	"'Til You Die"	3:52
13.	"Somewhere Beautiful"	3:44
Total length:		50:31

== Personnel ==
Ra

- Sahaj Ticotin – lead vocals, guitar, production, mixing, engineer
- Ben Carroll – guitar, backing vocals
- P.J. Farley – bass, backing vocals
- Skoota Warner – drums, engineer

Additional personnel

- Dustin Bates – additional vocals on "Enough"
- Lajon Witherspoon – additional vocals on "Nobody Loves You"
- Ray Aldaco – engineer
- Brooke Villanyi – vocal editing
- Wyatt Traxler – drum editing
- Shawn Dealey – vocal engineer for Lajon Witherspoon
- Christopher Jones – album art
- Paul Logus – mastering
