= Duality (Ra album) =

Studio album by Ra
- Released: June 21, 2005 (U.S.)
- Recorded: Henson Recording Studios, Hollywood, California
- Genre: Hard rock; progressive rock
- Length: 48:59
- Label: Republic; Universal
- Producer: Bob Marlette; Sahaj

Ra chronology
From One (2002)	Duality (2005)	Raw (2006)

Singles from Duality
- 1. "Fallen Angels" Released: May 24, 2005; 2. "Every Little Thing She Does Is Magic" Released: 2005; 3. "The Only One" Released: 2005

Professional ratings
Review scores
Source	Rating
AntiMusic	(Paul Gunnel) (antiGUY)

Duality is the second studio album by American alternative metal band Ra. This is the band's first album with bassist/backing vocalist P.J. Farley and drummer Andy Ryan.

The style from this album has noticeably changed since Ra's debut album of From One. The album boasts a hard rock and melodic vibe whereas their first album had more of a nu metal feel. The middle-eastern influences in the CD are still present, but are noticeably pushed back. Akin to their former album, Duality only claimed one charting single, which was the song "Fallen Angels", a song that was inspired by the Kevin Smith film Dogma. The tenth track "Got Me Going" was played on the radio in the background of the movie Hot Rod.

Early pressings of the album were immediately recalled from stores because of a manufacturing glitch, as skipping could be heard on track 2. The problem has since been corrected, and latest pressings of the album feature a sticker on the front of the case stating it to be a remastered version. Ra has sold 80,000 copies of Duality. Duality peaked at no. 137 on the Billboard 200 and no. 2 on the Heatseekers Albums chart.

== Track listing ==
All tracks are written by Sahaj Ticotin, except where noted.

No.	Title	Writer(s)	Length
1.	"Fear"		0:52
2.	"Fallen Angels"		3:22
3.	"Tell Me"	Bob Marlette, Ticotin	3:44
4.	"Take Me Away"	Allain Johanness, Marlette, Ticotin	3:50
5.	"I Lost Everything Today"	Ben Carroll, Ticotin	3:19
6.	"The Only One"		3:38
7.	"Superman"		4:16
8.	"Love"		0:47
9.	"Say You Will"	Marlette, Ticotin	3:59
10.	"Got Me Going"	Marlette, Ticotin	2:34
11.	"Every Little Thing She Does Is Magic" (The Police cover)	Gordon Sumner	3:45
12.	"Far Enough"		3:19
13.	"Undertaken"		3:44
14.	"Taken"	Carroll, Ticotin	4:14
15.	"Swimming Upstream"		3:37

== Credits ==
- Sahaj Ticotin - vocals, guitar, percussion, programming
- Ben Carroll - guitar, backing vocals
- P.J. Farley - bass, backing vocals
- Andy Ryan - drums
