= Downstait =

American rock band

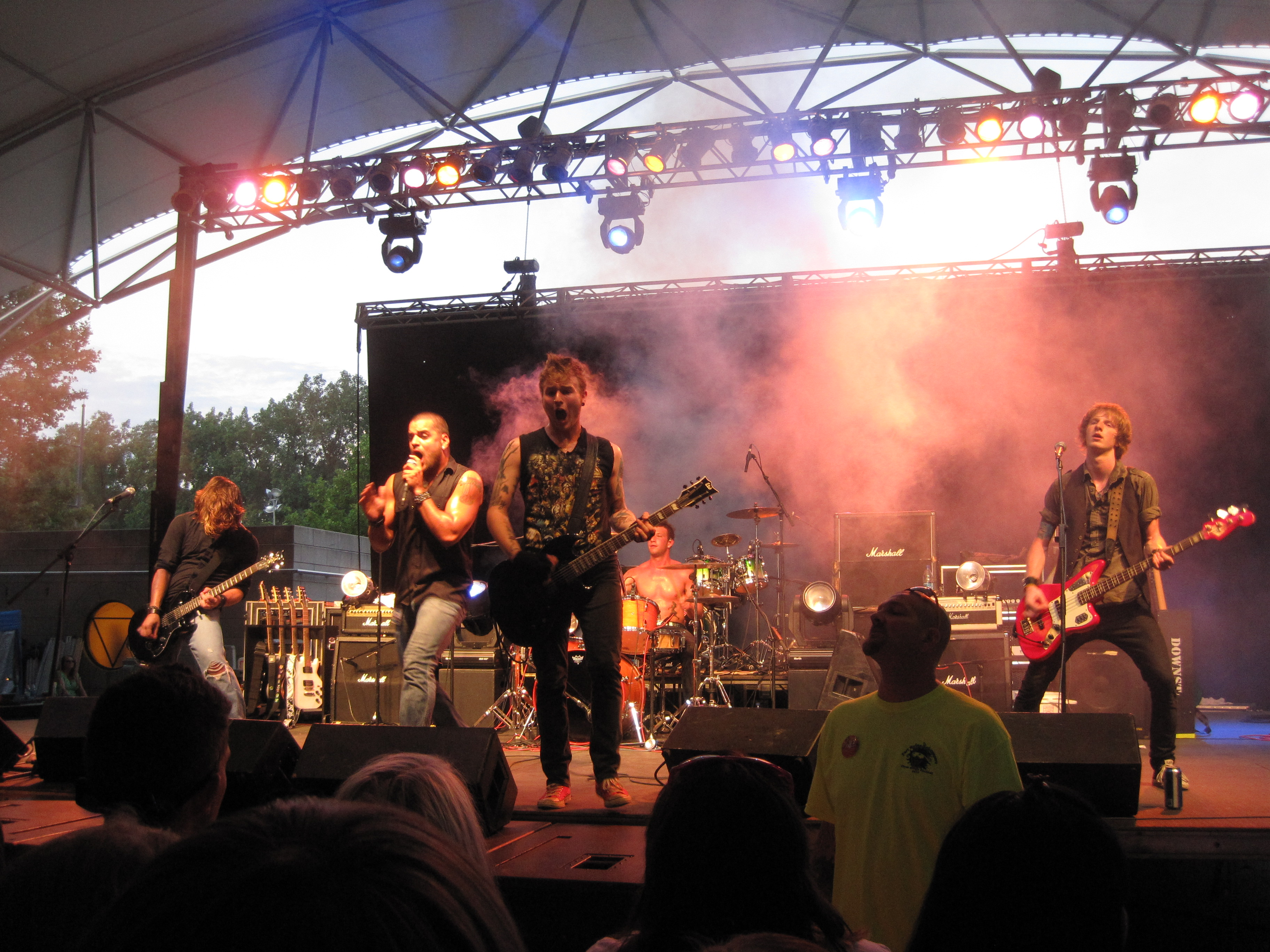
- Downstait performing in Fort Wayne, Indiana, in 2010. From left: Justin Call, Zack Call, Isaiah Zwick, Jethro McConnell, Sean Arata

Background information
- Origin: Fort Wayne, Indiana
- Genres: Alternative metal, alternative rock, hard rock
- Years active: 2002–present
- Label: Sahaja Music Records
- Members: Zack Call; Justin Call; Isaiah Zwick; Sean Arata
- Past members: Jethro McConnell

Downstait is an American rock band from Fort Wayne, Indiana. It consists of lead singer Zack Call, guitarists Justin Call and Isaiah Zwick, and bassist Sean Arata. The band is most well known for contributing several songs used as entrance music to various professional wrestlers, including Cody Rhodes, The Miz, Britt Baker D.M.D., Buddy Matthews and Matt Cardona and AEW first PLE All In.

Formed in 2002, Downstait came to the attention of the lead singer of Ra, Sahaj Ticotin, who offered to work with the group and produced their albums. They later were recruited by MTV to write a theme song for their TV show Bully Beatdown, and then by WWE to write entrance music for their wrestlers. Their songs have attracted numerous streams online, with the theme for Rhodes drawing over 90 million streams on Spotify and briefly topping the iTunes US rock charts.

== History ==
Downstait was formed in 2002 as Label Kills, before later changing their name. Its founding members met as teenagers while attending South Side High School in Fort Wayne, Indiana, and realized they had a shared interest in music, particularly after attending a concert by Sevendust. By 2007, their lineup was solidified with Zack Call performing lead vocals, Justin Call and Isaiah Zwick on guitar, Sean Arata on bass, and Jethro McConnell on drums.

Early in Downstait's history, the band contacted Stiller, a disc jockey at Fort Wayne radio station WBYR. Stiller in turn reached out to Sahaj Ticotin, the lead singer of Ra, who listened to Downstait's music on Myspace and offered to work with them. He provided support to the band's writing processes and development of their image. Ticotin produced Downstait's first EP, Can You Hear Me Now?, which was released in 2007. Downstait later toured with Ra and Skid Row, and completed a full-length album in 2009, Separation Anxiety, which contained all of the tracks from their EP plus additional ones. Ticotin produced this album as well, and also had writing credit on all tracks on the album. Separation Anxiety was remastered the next year and rereleased as the self-titled album Downstait, released on Ticotin's Sahaja Music Records.

While working with Ticotin, MTV approached the band and requested a theme song for their TV show Bully Beatdown. According to Justin Call, the song they performed for the show led to a cold call from WWE, requesting entrance music for The Miz. This led to Downstait recording "I Came to Play", debuting around the time of The Miz's first WWE United States Championship run. As of April 2023, "I Came to Play" has been streamed over 9 million times on Spotify. This was followed by two additional themes: "Say It to My Face" for Alex Riley and "I Am Perfection" for Dolph Ziggler, the latter of which was changed into the song "Here to Show the World". Justin Call credits Matt Cardona, then wrestling in WWE as Zack Ryder, for much of their early success: "We did a song for (Cardona), and he ended up using it on SmackDown and once that got going a little bit people started recognizing us again." Arata expressed some frustration with how WWE helped their exposure, stating, "The tricky part is that people hear us, but they don't know who we are, unless they do a little research for themselves."

Later in 2013, Downstait released With You in Mind, their second album. Produced by Ticotin, With You in Mind did not feature any contributions by McConnell, and introduced Downstait as a four-member group. After 2013, Downstait's contributions to WWE decreased and the band did not put out a new album. Each of the four members of the group focused on other jobs; Arata is a lawyer, while Zack Call is a school administrator and Justin Call runs a body shop.

In 2016, Cody Rhodes put a message out on Twitter asking fans what theme song he should use as an independent wrestler, having recently left WWE. Downstait reached out to Rhodes and offered to write one for him, although Rhodes recalls reaching out to Downstait instead. "Kingdom", the song the band wrote, became Rhodes' theme and he told the band that he would take it everywhere he wrestled. At AEW Revolution in 2020, Downstait performed the song live to Rhodes' entrance. Later, when Rhodes returned to WWE prior to WrestleMania 38 in 2022, the band negotiated with WWE on a price for rights for the company to use "Kingdom" for Cody's entrance, with Zack Call explaining, "...we all have regular jobs and we just wanted our cut of the pie on this one." Rhodes told WWE during the negotiations that he would not return without "Kingdom" as his entrance music, leading to the rights being secured two weeks before Rhodes' return.

Downstait have continued to write and perform entrance music for wrestlers, including for Dustin Rhodes, Britt Baker, Buddy Matthews, Chelsea Green, Matt Cardona, and Austin Lane. After WrestleMania XL in April 2024, "Kingdom" became the top song on iTunes' US rock charts. The song surpassed 50 million streams on Spotify the following month. Downstait also released a new single, "Sleep", in July 2024.

== Musical style ==
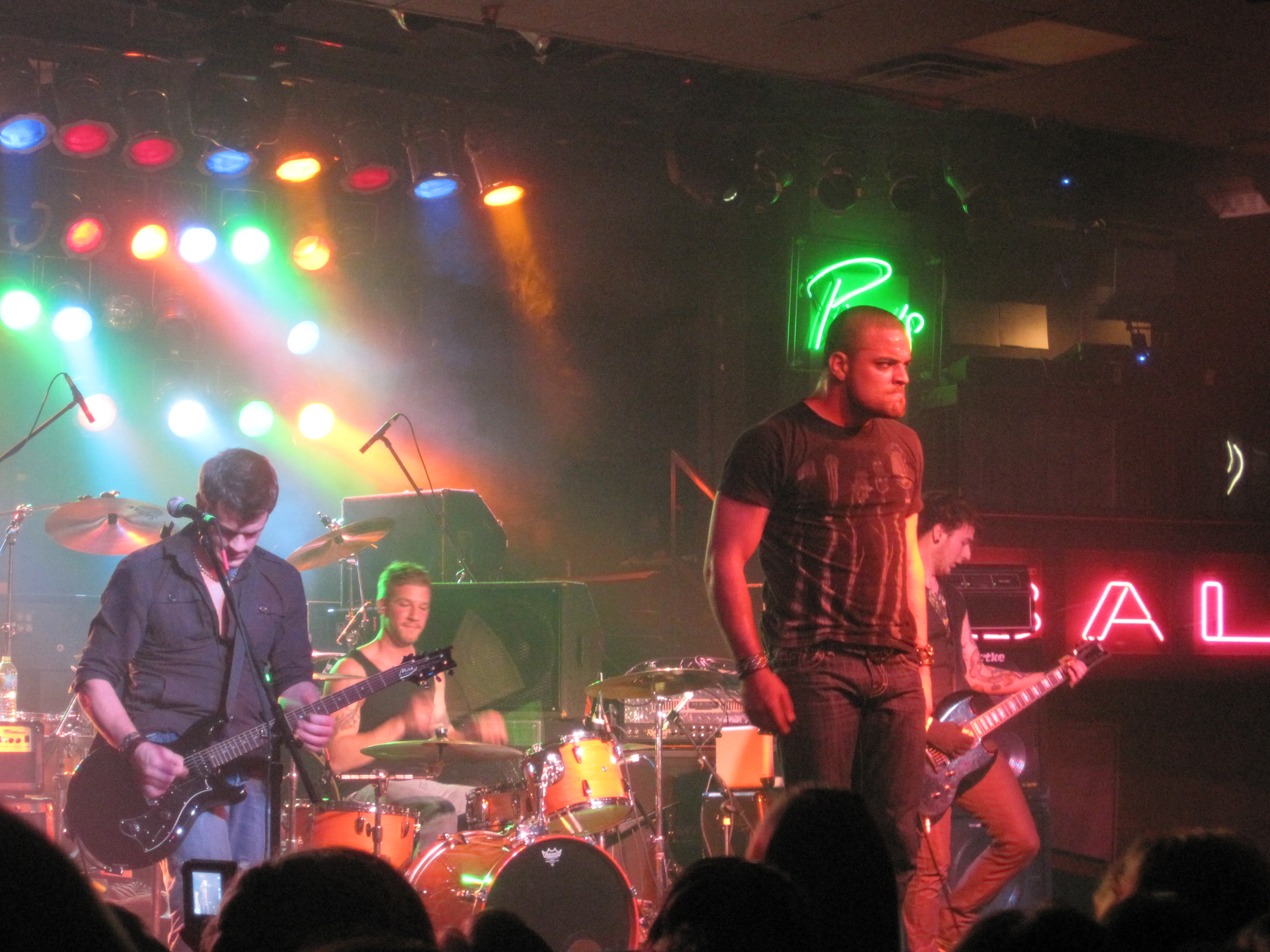
Downstait performing in 2010

In an album review for Separation Anxiety, Chris Hupe, a reviewer for Fort Wayne music publication whatzup, described Downstait's music as having similar sensibilities to Ra, including Ra's ability to write music with hooks. Hupe also said that while Sahaj Ticotin's influence was apparent, Downstait added elements of their own style as well, and in another review aligned their style with that of Trapt. Andrew Gaug of the St. Joseph News-Press compared Downstait's music as similar to Sevendust and Breaking Benjamin. In a review for With You in Mind, reviewer Ryan Smith of whatzup pointed out the presence of thrash and anthem-like sections in their music, and described the music as "a generally aggro stance and streamlined but heavy guitars with hip-hop and electronic inflections to create an urban heavy rock sound". He stated, "Point blank, if you're a fan of bands like P.O.D., Korn, Papa Roach and Three Days Grace and you're looking for a local band to get into, Downstait will be just what the doctor ordered."

== Discography ==
Title	Details
Can You Hear Me Now?	Released: 2007; Label: independent
Separation Anxiety	Released: 2009; Label: independent
Downstait	Released: 2011; Label: Sahaja Music Records
With You in Mind	Released: 2013; Label: independent
