= Black Sheep (Ra album) =

Compilation album by Ra
- Released: June 9, 2009
- Recorded: 1994–2009
- Genre: Alternative metal, nu metal, progressive rock, rap rock
- Length: 65:48
- Label: Sahaja Music/Federal Distribution
- Producer: Ra

Ra chronology
Black Sun (2008)	Black Sheep (2009)	Critical Mass (2013)

Singles from Black Sheep
- 1. "Supernova" Released: 2009; 2. "Crazy Little Voices" Released: 2009

Professional ratings
Review scores
Source	Rating
The Tune	4/5 stars
Shipwreck Island Studios	(3.75/5)

Black Sheep is a rarities album by American alternative metal band Ra, being their fifth release total, including their live album. It includes a collection of B-sides and demos that go back to 1994. Ra's newest single "Supernova" is featured on the album; "Supernova" was digitally released on June 9, 2009. Black Sheep was digitally released on iTunes, but was never released for physical purchasing in retail stores.

The only previously released song is "Crazy Little Voices". It was originally released in 1999 as part of The Rage: Carrie 2 Original Motion Picture Soundtrack. Rapping is prevalent in the album, especially in the songs "The Foundation", "Busted", "Chained to the Ground", and "Deliverance". The album's most straight-up, heavy metal song is "Baghdad"; this song is similar to "Parole" from Ra's debut album, From One. In the outro of "Chained to the Ground", the musicians play a part of Black Sabbath's "War Pigs".

== Track listing ==
No.	Title	Length
1.	"Cross of Snow"	5:20
2.	"Tomorrow's Sun"	5:37
3.	"The Foundation"	3:26
4.	"Crazy Little Voices"	3:49
5.	"Chained to the Ground"	4:06
6.	"Deliverance"	4:11
7.	"Busted"	3:22
8.	"U Need Me"	5:06
9.	"What I Am"	5:14
10.	"Who's to Blame"	3:40
11.	"Not In Your Head"	4:04
12.	"What I'm About"	3:58
13.	"Seen All Good People"	6:10
14.	"Baghdad"	3:53
15.	"Supernova"	3:55
Total length:		65:51

2010 version iTunes release
No.	Title	Length
1.	"Supernova"	3:54
2.	"Cross of Snow"	5:26
3.	"Yesterday's Rain"	5:53
4.	"The Foundation"	3:26
5.	"Busted"	3:24
6.	"Baghdad"	3:55
7.	"Chained to the Ground"	4:13
8.	"Crazy Little Voices"	3:51
9.	"What I Am"	5:20
10.	"Not In Your Head"	4:11
11.	"U Need Me"	5:11
12.	"What I'm About"	4:03
13.	"Seen All Good People"	6:22
14.	"Who's to Blame"	3:41

2010 (b-sides) special edition - Full Disclosure
No.	Title	Length
1.	"Cross Of Snow 1994"	5:26
2.	"Fu Greg 1994 (aka Yesterday's Rain, Tomorrow's Sun)"	5:53
3.	"The Foundation 1996"	3:28
4.	"All The Way 1998"	4:00
5.	"And Then Start Over 1998"	4:47
6.	"Sky 1998"	5:20
7.	"Crazy Little Voices 1999"	5:33
8.	"Busted 1999"	3:24
9.	"You don't know 1999"	3:41
10.	"Part Of Me 1999"	3:57
11.	"My Body Demo 1999"	3:45
12.	"Chained To The Ground 2000"	4:14
13.	"Deliverance 2000"	4:17
14.	"Fallen Angels 2001"	3:47
15.	"Swimming Upstream Demo 2001"	4:19
16.	"DYCMN LATE DEMO 2002"	4:14
17.	"Not In Ur Head 2004"	4:12
18.	"Take Me Away (original version) 2004"	4:24
19.	"What I am 2004"	5:21
20.	"Who's To Blame 2004"	3:41
21.	"U Need Me 2004"	5:12
22.	"What I'm About 2005"	4:03
23.	"Baghdad 1998/2005"	3:55
24.	"Seen All Good People 2005"	6:22
25.	"Supernova 2009"	3:59
