= Broken Hearted Soul =

Single by Ra

from the album Black Sun
- Released: December 25, 2007
- Recorded: 2007–2008
- Length: 3:33
- Label: Sahaja Music Records
- Songwriter: Sahaj

Ra singles chronology
"Don't Turn Away" (2006)	"Broken Hearted Soul" (2007)	"Supernova" (2009)

"Broken Hearted Soul" is a single by Ra from the album Black Sun, released on Christmas Day of 2007. On the same day, it was available for a free download on Ra's Myspace for only 24 hours. The single was available on iTunes as of June 17, 2008. "Broken Hearted Soul" received a double feature on the iTunes rock homepage and downloaded 8,000 singles by album launch. It also reached #2 on the Heatseekers National chart and #38 on R&R Active Rock.

Sahaj said: "'Broken Hearted Soul' is one of the best songs I have ever written".

== Reception ==
Billboard said: "Rock stations aren't the only ones totally asleep at the wheel on this one. 'Broken Hearted Soul' should be spinning alongside Daughtry, Hinder, and Nickelback at top 40."

TuneLabMusic said: "'Broken Hearted Soul' busts out in a frolic, setting a happy-go-lucky vibe that Ra needed to prove they have been able to slay the wraiths of the past and move forward triumphantly. As the leadoff batter and first piece of radio matter from 'Black Sun', the consistent oomph of 'Broken Hearted Soul' proves clutch."

WGLI-FM, the Rockin' Eagle' said: "This song is also kind of one of a kind; I like how the band mixes it up with it being slow at first then hitting it hard during the verses and the chorus."

== Charts ==
Chart (2008)	Peak position
US Active Rock (Billboard)	38
