= Black Sun (Ra album) =

Studio album by Ra
- Released: September 23, 2008
- Recorded: 2007
- Studios: Sun God Rock Studios, Fort Wayne, Indiana
- Genres: Hard rock; alternative metal; experimental rock
- Length: 46:25
- Label: Sahaja Music Records
- Producer: Sahaj Ticotin

Ra chronology
Raw (2006)	Black Sun (2008)	Black Sheep (2009)

Singles from Black Sun
- 1. "Broken Hearted Soul" Released: December 25, 2007

Professional ratings
Review scores
Source	Rating
TuneLab Music	6.5/10
EverythingMusic	(no rating)
RockUnited	9/10

Black Sun is the third studio album from the alternative metal band Ra, released on September 23, 2008. "Broken Hearted Soul" was released as a single on Christmas Day 2007, later becoming available on iTunes on June 17, 2008. Black Sun was released to iTunes on September 16, 2008. Some retailers did not carry this album due to distribution problems (unverified).

The album reached #193 on the Billboard 200. It also reached #2 on Heatseekers Albums, and #30 on Independent Albums. Black Sun has sold more than 20,000 copies, while its single "Broken Hearted Soul" has sold more than 18,000.

== Background ==
"'Raw' is actually released with no contract but the band gives Cement shoes the benefit of the doubt. 14 months later there is neither a contract nor is there a follow-up studio album. Most fans had already figured that that band has broken up and that the new record would never see the light of day but Sahaj has never been one to let anyone hold him or Ra back. With his own money and the money of independent promoter Elizabeth Hodges, Sahaj opens Sahaja Music Records or SMR, going back to his friends at Universal to make an exclusive distribution deal."

== Production ==
=== Title origin ===
"Black Sun is going to be… I’m naming it that specifically because the first record was From One, the second record was Duality and there are kind of spiritual connotations in all of that. I think this record is going to have the same level of spirituality but it’s going to be darker and that’s why we’re calling it Black Sun." - Sahaj

=== Recording ===
During the writing/recording process, Sahaj had to go through surgery to repair a ruptured disc in his back. Due to his obvious physical discomfort, Sahaj admitted to rushing the creation of the album. PJ Farley said, "It was a unique process because, this was the first time that we actually just got in a room and jammed and just hashed out material and would just hit record and play for hours".

== Track listing ==
All tracks are written by Sahaj Ticotin, except where noted.

No.	Title	Writer(s)	Length
1.	"Broken Hearted Soul"		3:33
2.	"Faulty Information"	Bob Marlette, Ticotin	4:14
3.	"The First Step"	Ben Carroll, Ticotin	4:26
4.	"Push"	Marlette, Ticotin	4:05
5.	"Don't Turn Away"	Marlette, Ticotin	4:03
6.	"Lost Along The Way"	Marlette, Ticotin	4:03
7.	"I Believe Again"	Marlette, Ticotin	3:18
8.	"Waste of Space"		5:47
9.	"Genocide"		3:42
10.	"A Poet's Dream"		3:29
11.	"Easier Than This"	PJ Farley, Ticotin	5:40

== Album chart positions ==
Album	Chart (2008)	Peak position
Black Sun	Billboard 200	193
Black Sun	Heatseekers Albums (was given the award, "Greatest Gainer")	2
Black Sun	Independent Albums	30

== Credits ==
- Andy Ryan - drums
- Sahaj Ticotin - guitar, vox, keyboards, producer
- PJ Farley - bass
- Ben Carroll - guitar, programming
