= Rectifier (Ra song) =

Single by Ra

from the album From One
- Released: April 29, 2003
- Genre: Alternative metal
- Length: 4:25
- Label: Republic; Universal
- Songwriter: Sahaj Ticotin
- Producers: Paul Logus; Sahaj

Ra singles chronology
| "Do You Call My Name" (2003) | "Rectifier" (2003) | "Skorn" (2003) |

"Rectifier" is a song by American alternative metal band Ra. The song was released as the second single from the band's debut From One. "Rectifier" was a modest success on the Billboard rock charts, but failed to match the success of previous single "Do You Call My Name", only reaching No. 30 on the Mainstream Rock chart.

An early version of "Rectifier" appeared on the band's debut EP One. The song was featured on the soundtrack of Project Gotham Racing 2.

== Music video ==
The song's music video shows the band performing it live at various shows during the 2003 tour with Seether.

== Track listing ==
| No. | Title | Length |
|---|---|---|
| 1. | "Rectifier" (radio edit) | 3:54 |

== Chart positions ==
| Chart (2003) | Peak position |
|---|---|
| US Active Rock (Billboard) | 30 |
| US Mainstream Rock (Billboard) | 30 |
| US Heritage Rock (Billboard) | 34 |

== Personnel ==
- Sahaj – lead vocals, guitar
- Ben Carroll – guitar
- Sean Corcoran – bass, backing vocals
- Skoota Warner – drums
