= Little Miss Nasty =

American burlesque and performance art collective

Little Miss Nasty is an American performance art collective known for combining rock and metal–influenced neo-burlesque with theatrical dance, acrobatic, and aerial elements. Founded in 2012 by dancer and choreographer Gina Katon, the group originated in Los Angeles and later established long-running residencies in Las Vegas and other U.S. cities. Over time, Little Miss Nasty expanded from live burlesque performances into touring productions and music releases, debuting as a recording act in the early 2020s.

== History ==
Little Miss Nasty was founded in 2012 by Gina Katon, initially as a single-act performance developed at the Viper Room in Hollywood, Los Angeles. The project later expanded into a larger collective, growing into a rotating cast of performers and a full-length stage production.

By the mid-2010s, the group had established recurring performances in Los Angeles and Santa Monica before expanding into national touring and residencies, including long-running engagements in Las Vegas.

== Live performances ==
Little Miss Nasty is known for high-energy live performances that merge burlesque with rock and metal aesthetics, often featuring acrobatic and aerial elements, along with choreographed stage production. The group has maintained residencies in cities including Las Vegas, Los Angeles, Long Beach, and San Francisco, and has appeared regularly at LGBTQ+ nightlife venues and Pride-related events.

Beginning in 2017, Little Miss Nasty expanded into large-scale concert touring, performing alongside metal and industrial acts such as In This Moment and Lords of Acid.

== Relationship with LGBTQ+ communities ==
The collective has been closely associated with LGBTQ+ nightlife and events, particularly within lesbian and queer spaces. According to Las Vegas PRIDE Magazine, Little Miss Nasty has performed at venues such as The Abbey in West Hollywood and Jolene's Bar in San Francisco, and has headlined Pride-related events across the United States. Members of the group have described their work as emphasizing inclusivity and freedom of expression.

== Music ==
During the COVID-19 pandemic, Little Miss Nasty expanded its activities into recorded music. The group released its debut single, "Hungry", in 2020, followed by additional releases developed during periods of reduced live performance activity.

In 2024, Little Miss Nasty released its debut studio album, Weapon of Choice, which incorporates elements of rock and metal alongside electronic and hip-hop influences.

== Other activities ==
In addition to live performances and music releases, the collective operates an online dance education program titled School of Nasty, which expanded during the COVID-19 pandemic to include virtual classes and interactive events.

== Discography ==
- Weapon of Choice (2024)

== See also ==
- The Pussycat Dolls
