= Shane Taylor =

Shane Taylor may refer to:

- Shane Taylor (actor)
- Shane Taylor (wrestler)
