= Kate Quigley =

American comedian, actress and model

- Born: December 12, 1981 (age 44); Canton, Ohio, U.S.

Comedy career
- Medium: Comedy, stand-up comedy, film, television, writing, podcasting
- Genre: Stand-up comedy
- Subject: Observational comedy

Kate Quigley is an American comedian, actress and model. She hosted Playboy TV’s Undercover and the 2016 AVN Awards. She has appeared as a headlining comedian at the Improv, Laugh Factory, Ice House Comedy Club, The Comedy Store, and Haha Comedy Club in Hollywood.

== Life ==
Quigley grew up in Canton, Ohio. After graduating high school, she left home to study theater at Roosevelt University's Chicago College of Performing Arts.

On September 4, 2021, Quigley was hospitalized in Los Angeles after suffering from an overdose of cocaine laced with fentanyl. Three of her companions, comedian Fuquan Johnson, Natalie Williamson, and Enrico Colangeli, also overdosed and died.

== Credits ==
- Star Trek: Hidden Frontier (2006)
- The Office (2006)
- Nissan LEAF Drive Electric Tour (2010-11)
- My Super-Overactive Imagination (2013–15)
- Guber (2016)
