= Do You Call My Name =

Single by Ra

from the album From One
- Released: January 14, 2003
- Genre: Alternative metal; nu metal
- Length: 5:16
- Label: Republic; Universal
- Songwriters: Sahaj Ticotin; Skoota Warner
- Producers: Paul Logus; Sahaj

Ra singles chronology
| ""Crazy Little Voices"" (1999) | "Do You Call My Name" (2003) | "Rectifier" (2003) |

"Do You Call My Name" is a song by American alternative metal band Ra. The song was released as the first single from the band's debut album From One. A live and acoustic version of the song was released as a standalone single in 2012.

== Background and overview ==
An earlier version of "Do You Call My Name" appeared on the band's debut EP One, released in 2000. The song has been featured and used in various other media and is one of the band's most popular songs.

The song's intro features influences from Middle Eastern music.

== Music video ==
A music video was created for the song and was directed by Clay Patrick McBride. The video shows the band performing the song, primarily focusing on Sahaj.

== Track listing ==
| No. | Title | Length |
|---|---|---|
| 1. | "Do You Call My Name" (radio edit) | 3:41 |

== Chart positions ==
| Chart (2003) | Peak position |
|---|---|
| US Active Rock (Billboard) | 11 |
| US Mainstream Rock (Billboard) | 14 |
| US Heritage Rock (Billboard) | 32 |

== Personnel ==
- Sahaj Ticotin – lead vocals, guitar
- Ben Carroll – guitar
- Sean Corcoran – bass, backing vocals
- Skoota Warner – drums
