= Fallen Angels (Ra song) =

Single by Ra

from the album Duality
- Released: May 24, 2005
- Genre: Alternative metal; hard rock
- Length: 3:22
- Label: Republic; Universal
- Songwriter: Sahaj Ticotin
- Producers: Bob Marlette; Sahaj

Ra singles chronology
"Skorn" (2003)	"Fallen Angels" (2005)	"Every Little Thing She Does Is Magic" (2005)

"Fallen Angels" is a song by American alternative metal band Ra. The song was released as the lead single from the band's second studio album Duality in May 2005. The song was inspired by the Kevin Smith film Dogma.

== Recall ==
Early versions of Duality were recalled due to a manufacturing glitch. The glitch was present on "Fallen Angels" that caused skipping throughout the song. The glitch was corrected and subsequent releases of Duality feature a sticker on the cover noting that it is a remastered version.

== Reception ==
"Fallen Angels" has received positive reviews. Paul Gunnel of antiMusic reacted positively to the song, saying it got his attention and he listened to it over and over again. antiGUY, also of antiMusic, said he could hear the song "spinning out of control on KROQ or other 'modern rock stations'", but called the song "a well crafted commercial single" and "a strong piece of songwriting that calls out to hit the repeat button."

== Track listing ==
No.	Title	Length
1.	"Fallen Angels" (Radio Edit)	2:59

== Chart positions ==
Chart (2005)	Peak position
US Active Rock (Billboard)	24
US Mainstream Rock (Billboard)	29

== Personnel ==
- Sahaj Ticotin – lead vocals, guitar
- Ben Carroll – guitar
- P.J. Farley – bass, backing vocals
- Andy Ryan – drums
