= Ra (band) =

American metal band

- Origin: Los Angeles, California, U.S.
- Genres: Alternative metal; nu metal; hard rock
- Years active: 1996–present
- Labels: Republic; Universal; Cement Shoes; Sahaja
- Members: Sahaj Ticotin; Ben Carroll; P. J. Farley; Dave Perry
- Past members: Sean Corcoran; Brix Milner; Andy Ryan; Skoota Warner
- Website: raband.net

Ra is an American alternative metal band originally from New York City, taking their name from the Egyptian sun god, Ra. The band was formed in 1996, and took off around 2002, when their song "Do You Call My Name" from their album From One was released. Their music was described as "exotic yet familiar, heavy yet funky, direct yet sophisticated, sensual yet soulful, unrelenting yet cathartic."

The band is known for their hit songs "Do You Call My Name", "Fallen Angels", "Don't Turn Away", and "Broken Hearted Soul". To date, Ra has sold 400,000+ albums in North America alone.

== History ==
=== Origin of band name ===
Frontman Sahaj Ticotin has commented on the origin of the name Ra in multiple interviews. "...There's an underlying theme where 80 to 90 percent of the songs have the word sun in it. So I have a little sun fetish and I thought that Ra was appropriate." He has also stated that he likes the idea of the name because it's short -- "If your name is Ra you've got two giant letters taking up the same amount of space so it looks like your name is bigger"—melodramatic, and "sort of an odd thing and really unique."

=== Early years: 1996–1998 ===
Marcus Ticotin, Sahaj's older brother and Abandon Entertainment president, financed Sahaj's first record while Sahaj was living in Greenwich, CT with mentor and friend Rob Jones. They held open auditions in New York City to fill in the lineup with a drummer, guitarist, and bassist. Skoota Warner was chosen as a drummer who fit in well with the blend of funk and hard rock in Sahaj's writing style. R&B bassist Kirk Lyons and guitarist Ben Mauro, the latter of whom would later play with Lionel Richie and Britney Spears, completed the initial configuration of the band. The members' influences did not completely mesh, but the lineup did produce one commercial track in "Crazy Little Voices," which appeared as the end title track for the movie The Rage: Carrie 2.

=== 1999–2001 ===
The moderate success of "Crazy Little Voices" led to the band signing with Edel America Records. On Edel's dime Ra went into Avatar Studios in NYC with Producer Rupert Hine and engineer Stephen Tayler to record an album. Within those recordings were "Fallen Rock Zone", "Rectifier", "Sky", "Do You Call My Name" and "Violator" all of which were produced by Sahaj and then later used on 2002s From One after Edel America went out of business. The leftover songs were released on the Black Sheep album circa 2009.

=== One and From One: 2001–2002 ===
"Do You Call My Name" received significant airplay on WAAF in Boston, Massachusetts. Due to this local success, the band released the EP One with the guidance of their then manager, Arma Andon. The band sold 7500 CDs in a month and a half, which led to a two-album deal with Universal Records who had otherwise not seen the band perform live.

Sahaj's friend, Will Pendarvis (K-rock NYC, Sirius), introduced him to Hip-hop Producer/Engineer Paul Logus (Puffy, Jennifer Lopez, 112, Notorious BIG, Pantera) with whom the band spent over $170,000 redoing "One" and turning it into "From One".

The album From One was released on October 22, 2002. Its lead single, "Do You Call My Name," reached a peak position of 14 on the Billboard Magazine music charts in early 2003.

=== Duality: 2003–2005 ===
Super-engineer Dave Schiffman (Rage Against the Machine, Audioslave, Red Hot Chili Peppers and The Mars Volta) was originally slated to co-produce the next LP with Sahaj, however, due to a close family member's health condition, Schiffman could no longer produce the album. This left Sahaj to produce the record alone. Universal was unhappy with the album the band delivered to them and recommended using Bob Marlette (Saliva, Seether, Shinedown) to record an additional few songs to give the album more radio potential. The band was given a budget of $400,000 to produce new songs. With Marlette, Ra recorded "Got Me Goin'", "Take Me Away" and "Say You Will" and submitted these songs to Universal only to receive yet another lukewarm reception. Desperate and unsure of the right course of action, Ra went to Los Angeles to make one last attempt at a first single for Duality. The outcome was "Tell Me"; a huge arena rock anthem shouting out to the world for guidance. The song was approved by Universal, but the record was originally left unreleased due to cost.

In the winter of 2004, Universal/Republic hired radio promotion director Dave Downey. One of his first activities was to listen to all of Ra's records. After listening to "Duality", he made Universal aware that they may have made a mistake with Ra, and that they were missing out on a potentially great record. By this point, drummer Skoota Warner left the band to find a more stable income. Universal released the album June 21, 2005, with little promotion. However, the album sold 80,000 copies on the strength of tracks like "Fallen Angels" and "Every Little Thing She Does Is Magic", a Police cover.

=== Raw and Black Sun: 2006–2008 ===
The band left Universal Records and signed with Cement Shoes Records. In October 2006, Ra released their third album entitled Raw, which includes 11 live tracks and one new studio track, "Don't Turn Away". The new song (and single) was meant to be a teaser for their next album, Black Sun, which was said to be "dynamic."

Black Sun was released September 23, 2008, under Sahaj's new label, Sahaja Music Records. It featured their newest single, "Broken Hearted Soul". The song "Faulty Information" was going to be the album's second single, but due to a lack of funding and time, the song was not released as a single.

=== Black Sheep: 2009–2012 ===
On June 10, 2009, Ra released a compilation album called Black Sheep. It contained 13 rare tracks including their debut single, "Crazy Little Voices", as well as their new single, "Supernova". The album is only available digitally.

Sahaj's solo album is tentatively titled, "Sahaj – Another Minute", named after the first single, "Another Minute".

In August 2011, Ra released the single "Running Blind", perhaps the first piece of their next studio album.

Frontman Sahaj Ticotin began the "Ra New LP 2012 Fan Drive" on Kickstarter, and wanted the new Ra LP to be "for the fans, by the fans". Beginning with a $7 donation, supporters are offered a plethora of gifts. The fundraiser expired on July 13, 2012. The band managed to raise $31,465 in support of the new album.

As of September 17, 2012, Sahaj Ticotin announced that original drummer Skoota Warner would be tracking drums for the new album.

=== Critical Mass: 2013–2019 ===
In July 2013, Ra released "Supermegadubstep", the debut single from their upcoming album, "Critical Mass".

The studio album, their first since 2008, and fourth overall was released on October 14, 2013. The new record marked the return of the band's "Duality" lineup: guitarist-vocalist Sahaj Ticotin, bassist PJ Farley, guitarist Ben Carroll, and drummer Skoota Warner, as well as guitarist Travis Montgomery on the intro of the lead single.

The following June saw the release of "The Best of Ra Unplugged" EP. Recorded at Sun God Rock Studios in Los Angeles, California, it features "Duality" lineup members PJ Farley on bass, Ben Carroll on guitar, with both contributing to background harmonies, and Sahaj Ticotin on drums, guitar and lead vocals.

=== Intercorrupted: 2020–present ===
On June 10, 2020, Wake Up! Music Rocks announced via social media that the band had signed to the label. The band worked on their new studio album, Intercorrupted, and premiered the title track as its lead single in October 30, 2020. The song "Jezebel" was released as second single in March 5, 2021. The full album was published on March 19, 2021. The album was met with enthusiasm both critically and from fans, with consistent emphasis on its musicianship, Tictotin's vocals, and its sound production. "Enough", which featured guest vocals from Dustin Bates of Starset and "Nobody Loves You", also featuring guest vocals from Lajon Witherspoon of Sevendust were particularly well received for their "radio appeal", whereas "Lets Go To Mexico" and "Somewhere Beautiful" were noted for their melodic, climactic qualities.

In 2024, Ticotin incrementally released new Ra material while touring and producing. Upon the completion of what Ticotin referred to as Ra's "final headlining tour", he announced on Instagram that new material will be released throughout 2025.

== Musical style ==
Ra uses influences of Indian or Arabian music in many songs. GarageBand.com stated: "Twisted melodies, polyrhythmic beats, and heavy guitar chords fuse together with middle-eastern motifs, hip-hop, and melodic balladry to make a cohesive visionary statement percolating with emotional fervor."

Sahaj Ticotin said, "The great thing about it is that you can play the meanest Meshuggah, heaviest rock riff you could possibly imagine under any scale and you [sic] if you sing over it in a harmonic minor scale it doesn't lose its heaviness, but it also doesn't lose its melody. It still manages to be cool, but also melodic." Notable songs that use this scale are "Do You Call My Name", "Violator", "Skorn", "The Only One", and "Broken Hearted Soul".

== Band members ==
=== Current ===
- Sahaj Ticotin – lead vocals, rhythm guitar (1996–present), lead guitar (1996–2001)
- Ben Carroll – lead guitar (2001–present)
- P. J. Farley – bass, backing vocals (2003–present)

=== Former ===
- Sean Corcoran – bass, backing vocals (1996–2003)
- Andy Ryan – drums (2004–2012)
- Skoota Warner – drums (1996–2004; 2012–2022)

== Discography ==
=== Albums ===
==== Studio albums ====
Title	Album details	Chart Positions		
Title	Album details	US	US Heat	US Indie
From One	Released: October 22, 2002; Label: Universal; Formats: CD, DL	154	6	—
Duality	Released: June 21, 2005; Label: Universal; Formats: CD, DL	137	2	—
Black Sun	Released: September 23, 2008; Label: Sahaja Music; Formats: CD, DL	193	2	30
Critical Mass	Released: October 24, 2013; Label: Sahaja Music; Formats: CD, DL	—	40	—
Intercorrupted	Released: March 19, 2021; Label: Wake Up! Music Rocks; Formats: CD, DL	— (Note: Although Intercorrupted did not enter the Billboard 200, it reached number 98 on the US Top Current Album Sales Chart.)	—	—

==== Extended plays ====
Title	EP details
One	Released: 2000; Format: CD; Label: Independent
The Best of Ra Unplugged	Released: 2014; Format: CD, DL; Label: Sahaja Music
Refix	Released: 2017; Format: DL; Label: Sahaja Music

==== Live albums ====
Title	EP details
Raw	Released: October 24, 2006; Format: CD, DL; Label: Cement Shoes

==== Compilations ====
Title	EP details
Black Sheep	Released: June 9, 2009; Format: DL; Label: Sahaja Music

=== Singles ===
Year	Single	Peak		Album
Year	Single	Act. Rock	US Main	Album
1999	"Crazy Little Voices"	—	—	The Rage: Carrie 2 Soundtrack
2003	"Do You Call My Name"	11	14	From One
2003	"Rectifier"	30	30	From One
2003	"Skorn"	—	—	From One
2005	"Fallen Angels"	24	29	Duality
2005	"Every Little Thing She Does Is Magic" (The Police cover)	—	—	Duality
2005	"The Only One"	—	—	Duality
2006	"Don't Turn Away"	35	36	Raw
2007	"Broken Hearted Soul"	38	—	Black Sun
2009	"Supernova"	—	—	Black Sheep
2009	"Crazy Little Voices"	—	—	Black Sheep
2011	"Running Blind"	—	—	Non-album single
2013	"Supermegadubstep"	—	—	Critical Mass
2013	"Awake"	—	—	Critical Mass
2015	"I'm Not an Angel"	—	—	Non-album singles
2015	"We Won't Back Down"	—	—	Non-album singles
2020	"Intercorrupted"	25	29	Intercorrupted
2021	"Jezebel"	—	—	Intercorrupted
2021	"Who We Be" (feat. Adrian Patrick) (DMX cover)	—	—	Non-album single
2021	"Enough" (feat. Dustin Bates)	—	—	Intercorrupted
2022	"Incomplete" (feat. Jason Hook and Keith Wallen) (Backstreet Boys cover)	—	—	Non-album single
2024	"Awake 24"	—	—	TBA
2024	"Lies"	—	—	TBA
2024	"Without You With Me"	—	—	TBA
2025	"Devil Mind"	—	—	TBA
2026	"Enough" (acoustic version)	—	—	Non-album single
