= From One =

Studio album by Ra
- Released: October 22, 2002 (US)
- Recorded: Sound on Sound Studios (New York City); Avatar Studios (New York City); Quad Studios (New York City)
- Genres: Alternative metal; nu metal; progressive metal
- Length: 52:47
- Label: Universal
- Producers: Paul Logus; Sahaj

Ra chronology
One (2000)	From One (2002)	Duality (2005)

Singles from From One
- 1. "Do You Call My Name" Released: January 14, 2003; 2. "Rectifier" Released: April 29, 2003; 3. "Skorn" Released: 2003

Professional ratings
Review scores
Source	Rating
Fazed	3/5 stars
Rocknworld	5/5 stars

From One is the debut studio album by American alternative metal band Ra, released on October 22, 2002. It features the band's hit single, "Do You Call My Name", which had a music video and was followed by their second single, "Rectifier". From One reached number 154 on the Billboard 200. Universal Music Group originally hosted a listening party so that people could listen to the entire album before it was released.

The first track "Do You Call My Name" was featured during the introduction and before commercial breaks during the 2006 NFL draft on ESPN, as well as video games MX Unleashed and Tiger Woods PGA Tour 2003. It also was used as an entrance theme for a wrestler Shawn Daivari during his Ring of Honor days, in addition to Ophidian as a singles theme on the independent circuit, most notably in Chikara Pro. The second track "Rectifier" was featured on the game Project Gotham Racing 2. Ra was featured as Artist of the Month on antimusic.com. Keavin Wiggins of AntiMusic named From One the top album of the decade.

== Explanation of inspiration ==
- All quotes taken from The Gauntlet's interview with lead singer Sahaj Ticotin

The concepts

– "I wanted to hear Metallica with the Police's Andy Summers playing guitar and Sting singing. It bothered me that there wasn't a band like that, so I formed one",

– "There's also an element of majesty that needs to be portrayed in the music's presentation. One of my favorite movies is The Matrix, and the look of that film is a real inspiration. A lot of the concepts presented in the film are ideas that feature in our songs".

The lyrics

– "I rarely write from my own experience. I spend most of the time observing the circumstances of those around me".

– "My lyrics don't read like Shakespeare, but he's definitely influenced my work"

== Track listing ==
All tracks are written by Sahaj Ticotin, except where noted.

No.	Title	Writer(s)	Length
1.	"Do You Call My Name"	Ticotin; Skoota Warner	5:16
2.	"Rectifier"		4:25
3.	"Fallen Rock Zone"		4:37
4.	"Only"		3:38
5.	"On My Side"		4:27
6.	"Violator"		5:00
7.	"I Believe"		4:11
8.	"Parole"		3:54
9.	"High Sensitivity"		4:04
10.	"Skorn"		5:00
11.	"Walking and Thinking"		3:32
12.	"Sky"	Ticotin; Nandi Johannes	4:49

== Band members ==
- Sahaj Ticotin – lead vocals, guitar
- Ben Carroll – guitar
- Sean Corcoran – bass, backing vocals
- Skoota Warner – drums
