= Craig Gass =

American actor, comedian and impressionist

- Born: February 15, 1970 (age 56)
- Occupation: Comedian

Craig Gass is an American actor, comedian and impressionist best known for his roles in King of Queens, Family Guy, American Dad, and Sex and the City and for auditioning as Jackie Martling's replacement on The Howard Stern Show, coming in second to Artie Lange. Craig is also known for his comedy special Craig Gass: The Worst Comedy Show Ever.

== Personal life ==
Gass was born into a deaf family, as his mother, father, and sister are completely without hearing. He mimicked the voices on television to learn how to speak. His first roommate in NYC was Mitch Hedberg in 1998 and in 2004, he lived in Eddie Van Halen's Recording Studio in California.

== Career ==
Gass began performing standup in 1993 in Seattle alongside other newcomers Brody Stevens, Josh Wolf, and Joey Diaz.

Gass gained early fame as a guest on The Howard Stern Show who became known for his impressions of various celebrities, including Gene Simmons, Sam Kinison, Tracy Morgan, Christopher Walken, and Al Pacino.

He was a writer for Weekend Update on SNL.

His appearances led to Gass landing an acting part on Sex and the City as Miranda's donut-eating boyfriend.

Gass' talent for impressions also led him to a guest-starring spot on King of Queens.

Gass has appeared in the films Pauly Shore is Dead and Noise.
