= AEW September to Remember =

2025 All Elite Wrestling television special

September to Remember
- Promotional poster featuring various AEW wrestlers
- Promotion: All Elite Wrestling
- Date: September 17, 2025
- City: London, Ontario, Canada
- Venue: Canada Life Place
- Attendance: 3,695

AEW Dynamite special episodes chronology
| ← Previous; Dynamite 300 | Next → Dynamite 6th Year Anniversary Show |

AEW Collision special episodes chronology
| ← Previous; Collision 100 | Next → Homecoming |

AEW in Canada chronology
| ← Previous; Forbidden Door | Next → All Out |

September to Remember was a professional wrestling television special produced by the American promotion All Elite Wrestling (AEW). It took place on Wednesday, September 17, 2025, at Canada Life Place in London, Ontario, Canada and aired as a three-hour special broadcast, simulcast on TBS and HBO Max, featuring Dynamite, which aired at its regular time of 8:00 p.m. Eastern Time (ET), which was immediately followed by a one-hour edition of Collision at 10:00 p.m. ET. The broadcast served as the go-home show for All Out on September 20, which was the first AEW pay-per-view event available to livestream on Max.

== Production ==
=== Background ===
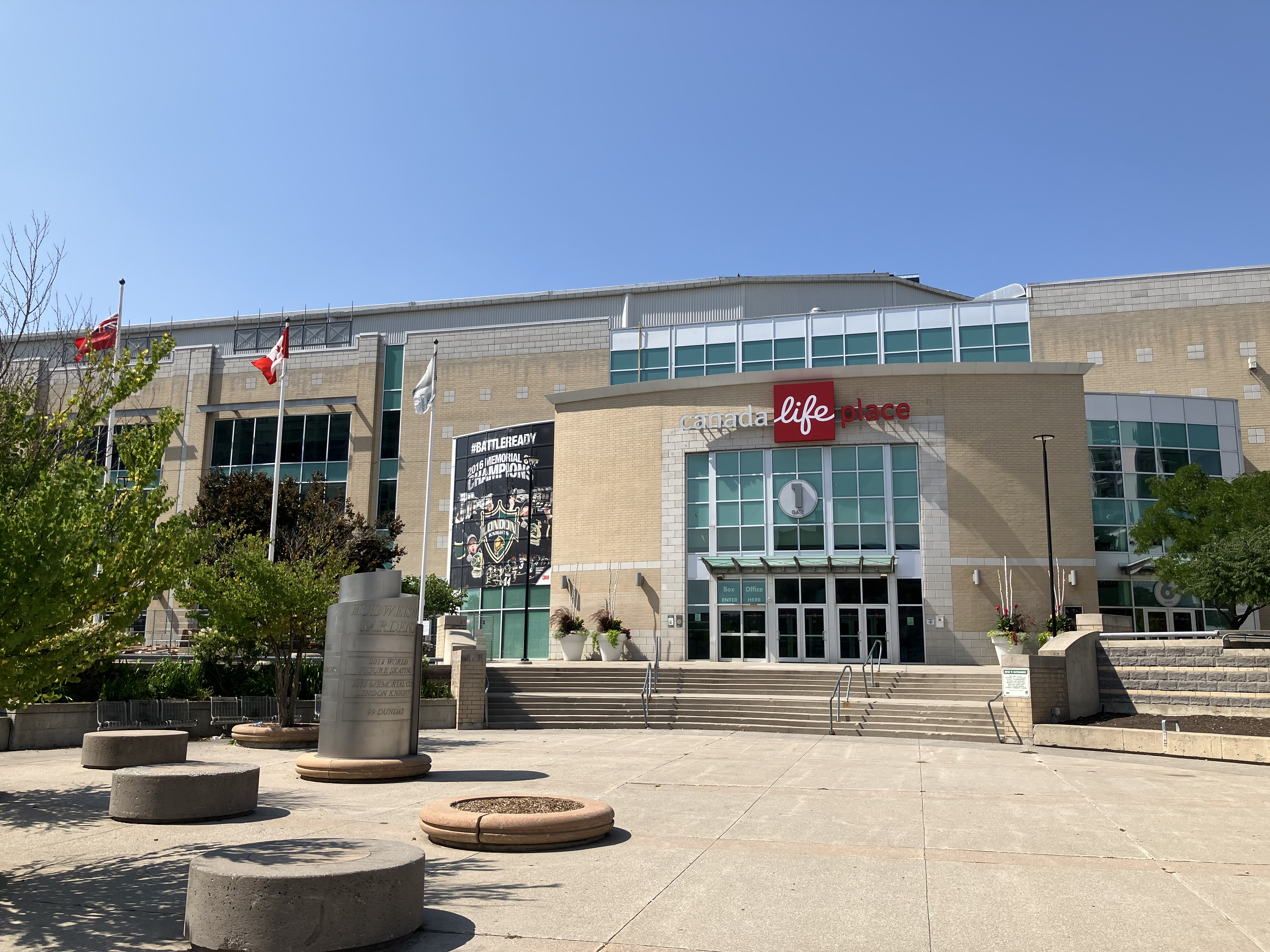
The event was held at Canada Life Place in London, Ontario, Canada.

AEW Dynamite, also known as Wednesday Night Dynamite, is the flagship weekly professional wrestling television program of the American promotion All Elite Wrestling (AEW). The show was originally broadcast on TNT, from October 2, 2019, to December 29, 2021, before moving to TBS on January 5, 2022. AEW Collision, also known as Saturday Night Collision, is AEW's secondary program that premiered on June 17, 2023. In January 2025, both programs began simulcasting on HBO Max.

On June 17, 2025, AEW announced that the September 17 episode of Dynamite would take place at Canada Life Place in London, Ontario. The venue, then known as Budweiser Gardens, previously hosted the March 30, 2024, episode of Collision and taped the April 5 episode of Rampage. On August 18, AEW filed a trademark for "September to Remember". On September 3, AEW announced that "September to Remember" would be a three-hour television special airing on September 17, featuring Dynamite and a one-hour edition of Collision, serving as the go-home show for the All Out pay-per-view (PPV) event on September 20, which was AEW's first PPV to livestream on Max. Immediately following the television special, TBS and Max aired Countdown to All Out, a thirty-minute preview of the event.

=== Storylines ===
September to Remember featured professional wrestling matches that involved different wrestlers from pre-existing scripted feuds and storylines. Storylines were produced on AEW's weekly television programs, Dynamite and Collision.

On the September 10, 2025, episode of Dynamite, it was announced that a six-man tournament would be held, with three competitors advancing to the AEW Unified Championship match at All Out. Tournament matches would take place on the September 13 episode of Collision and at September to Remember, the latter featuring Máscara Dorada facing The Beast Mortos.

Three qualifying matches for the four-way AEW World Tag Team Championship ladder match at All Out would take place at September to Remember.

== Results ==
Dynamite (aired live September 17)
| No. | Results | Stipulations | Times |
|---|---|---|---|
| 1 | Jon Moxley (with Daniel Garcia and Marina Shafir) defeated Roderick Strong (with Kyle O'Reilly) by submission | Singles match | 12:50 |
| 2 | Bobby Lashley (with MVP and Shelton Benjamin) defeated Toa Liona (with Bishop Kaun and Ricochet) by technical submission | Singles match | 10:00 |
| 3 | The Young Bucks (Matt Jackson and Nick Jackson) defeated Bang Bang Gang (Austin Gunn and Juice Robinson) by pinfall | Qualifying match for the AEW World Tag Team Championship ladder match at All Out | 11:40 |
| 4 | Máscara Dorada defeated The Beast Mortos by pinfall | AEW Unified Championship Eliminator match Winner advanced to a three-way match at All Out. | 10:05 |
| 5 | Thekla defeated Queen Aminata by pinfall | No Holds Barred match (Note: The final minutes of this match took place on Collision.) | 10:35 |

Collision (aired live September 17)
| No. | Results | Stipulations | Times |
|---|---|---|---|
| 1 | JetSpeed (Kevin Knight and "Speedball" Mike Bailey) defeated Killswitch and Kip Sabian (with Mother Wayne) by pinfall | Qualifying match for the AEW World Tag Team Championship ladder match at All Out | 12:05 |
| 2 | Riho defeated Robyn Renegade by pinfall | Singles match | 4:55 |
| 3 | Don Callis Family (Hechicero and Josh Alexander) (with Don Callis) defeated Top Flight (Dante Martin and Darius Martin) (with Christopher Daniels) by pinfall | Qualifying match for the AEW World Tag Team Championship ladder match at All Out | 10:45 |
