= All Out (2025) =

All Elite Wrestling pay-per-view event

- Promotional poster featuring various AEW wrestlers
- Promotion: All Elite Wrestling
- Date: September 20, 2025
- City: Toronto, Ontario, Canada
- Venue: Scotiabank Arena
- Attendance: 12,222
- Buy rate: 137,500

Pay-per-view chronology
← Previous; Forbidden Door	Next → WrestleDream

All Out chronology
← Previous; 2024	Next → 2026

AEW in Canada chronology
← Previous; September to Remember	Next → Dynasty

The 2025 All Out, also promoted as All Out: Toronto, was a professional wrestling pay-per-view (PPV) event produced by the American promotion All Elite Wrestling (AEW). It was the seventh annual All Out and took place on September 20, 2025, at Scotiabank Arena in Toronto, Ontario, Canada. Excluding the 2020 event, which was held at Daily's Place in Jacksonville, Florida due to the COVID-19 pandemic, this was the first All Out held outside the Chicago metropolitan area and subsequently the United States. It was AEW's first PPV event available to livestream on HBO Max, and it aired at a special start time of 3:00 p.m. Eastern Time (ET), preceded by the Saturday Tailgate Brawl pre-show at 2:00 p.m. ET, which was simulcast on HBO Max and TNT.

Fourteen matches were contested at the event, including four on the Tailgate Brawl pre-show. In the main event, "Hangman" Adam Page defeated Kyle Fletcher to retain the AEW World Championship. In other prominent matches, Kris Statlander defeated previous champion "Timeless" Toni Storm, Thekla, and Jamie Hayter to win the AEW Women's World Championship, making her the first woman to have won both of AEW's women's championships (the other being the AEW TBS Championship), Jon Moxley defeated Darby Allin in a Coffin match, Mark Briscoe defeated MJF in a Tables 'n' Tacks match, and in the opening bout, Adam Copeland and Christian Cage defeated FTR (Cash Wheeler and Dax Harwood). The event featured the returns of Eddie Kingston, who performed in his first match since New Japan Pro Wrestling's Resurgence event, as well as Pac and "Jungle" Jack Perry of Jurassic Express, the latter turning face for the first time since 2023, and the first AEW appearance of Beth Copeland (formerly known as Beth Phoenix in WWE).

All Out received generally positive reviews, with AEW World Championship bout between Page and Fletcher, the Three-Way match for the Unified Championship, and the Table'n'Tacks receiving particular high reviews. Conversely, Kingston's return bout against Big Bill was received generally negatively.

== Production ==
=== Background ===
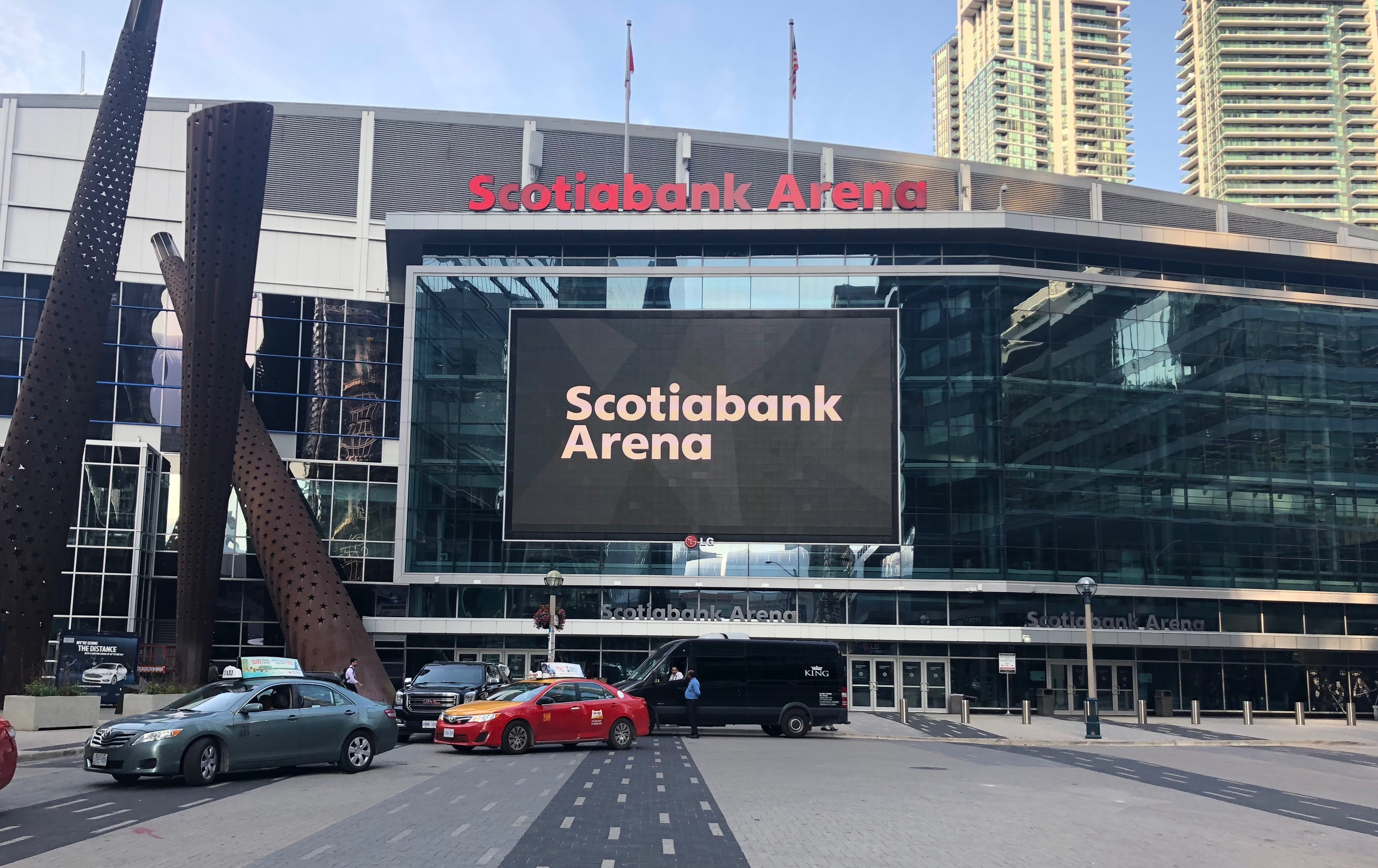
The event was held at Scotiabank Arena in Toronto, Ontario, Canada.

All Out is an annual professional wrestling pay-per-view (PPV) event held in September by All Elite Wrestling (AEW) since 2019. It is one of AEW's "Big Five" PPVs, which also includes All In, Double or Nothing, Full Gear, and Revolution, their five biggest annual shows produced throughout the year.

On May 20, 2025, the Toronto Sun reported that the seventh annual All Out would take place on Saturday, September 20, 2025, at Scotiabank Arena in Toronto, Ontario, Canada, breaking AEW's tradition of hosting the event in the Chicago metropolitan area, and subsequently in the United States, as all prior non-COVID-19 pandemic era events were held either at Now Arena in the Chicago suburb of Hoffman Estates, Illinois, or at Chicago's United Center for the 2023 event. It was also AEW's second PPV event to take place in Canada and at this venue, after Forbidden Door in 2023. Tickets went on sale on June 2.

=== Broadcast ===
Other on-screen personnel
Role	Name
Commentators	Excalibur (PPV)
Commentators	Tony Schiavone (Pre-show and PPV)
Commentators	Bryan Danielson (PPV)
Commentators	Taz (PPV)
Commentators	Nigel McGuinness (Pre-show)
Commentators	Matt Menard (Pre-show)
Commentators	Don Callis (AEW World and Unified Championship matches)
Spanish commentators	Carlos Cabrera
Spanish commentators	Alvaro Riojas
Spanish commentators	Ariel Levy
Ring announcers	Arkady Aura (Pre-show + PPV )
Ring announcers	Justin Roberts (PPV)
Referees	Aubrey Edwards
Referees	Bryce Remsburg
Referees	Mike Posey
Referees	Paul Turner
Referees	Rick Knox
Referees	Stephon Smith
Pre-show hosts	Renee Paquette
Pre-show hosts	RJ City

All Elite Wrestling pay-per-view events are available on Prime Video in the United States, Canada, and the United Kingdom. In the United States, Puerto Rico, and the U.S. Virgin Islands, they are also offered via traditional cable and satellite providers, including DirecTV, Sling TV, and Dish Network, as well as through PPV.com and YouTube. In Canada, they are available on traditional PPV providers, PPV.com, and YouTube. Select international markets can access events through PPV.com, Triller TV, and YouTube. Events are also shown at all Dave & Buster's and Tom's Watch Bar locations across the United States. On September 3, 2025, AEW announced that beginning with All Out, its pay-per-views would also be available in the United States on HBO Max, with subscribers getting an exclusive discounted price of US$39.99, compared to US$49.99 on other platforms.

The go-home show, September to Remember, which was simulcast on TBS and HBO Max took place on September 17 from Canada Life Place in London, Ontario, consisting of Dynamite, a special one-hour episode of Collision, and the half-hour preview Countdown to All Out. All Out was scheduled to air at 3 p.m. Eastern Time (ET), preceded by the pre-show Saturday Tailgate Brawl: All Out at 2 p.m. ET, which aired on TNT. The event was originally scheduled for a start time of 8 p.m. ET, but on September 3, 2025, it was announced that the event would be moved up to 3 p.m. ET to prevent a direct counterprogramming attempt by WWE's Wrestlepalooza. This would have been the first AEW PPV event to go head-to-head with a WWE main roster PPV and livestreaming event, as previously, only select WWE NXT livestreaming events had aired directly against AEW's PPVs.

=== Storylines ===
All Out featured 14 professional wrestling matches that involved different wrestlers from pre-existing scripted feuds and storylines. Storylines were produced on AEW's weekly television programs, Dynamite and Collision.

At Fight for the Fallen on January 1, 2025, Adam Copeland teamed with FTR (Cash Wheeler and Dax Harwood) as the trio Rated-FTR and defeated Death Riders (Claudio Castagnoli, Jon Moxley, and Wheeler Yuta). On the January 4 episode of Collision, Rated-FTR defeated The Learning Tree (Big Bill, Bryan Keith, and Chris Jericho), establishing themselves as a trio. Copeland continued his feud with the Death Riders, losing to Castagnoli and Moxley in a Brisbane Brawl with Jay White at Grand Slam Australia and unsuccessfully challenging Moxley for the AEW World Championship at Revolution. At Dynasty on April 6, Rated-FTR unsuccessfully challenged the Death Riders (Castagnoli, Pac, and Yuta) for the AEW World Trios Championship. After the match, FTR attacked Copeland, turning heel in the process. Three months later at All In on July 12, Copeland returned and rescued Christian Cage from a post-match beatdown by FTR and The Patriarchy. Copeland and Cage reunited as a tag team at Forbidden Door and defeated The Patriarchy (Killswitch and Kip Sabian). It was their first time teaming since 2011. On the August 27 episode of Dynamite, Copeland and Cage challenged FTR to a match at All Out in Toronto, the hometown of both Copeland and Cage, which was later made official. This will be the first time ever Copeland and Cage have teamed together on a pay-per-view in Canada. During the All Out media call, Tony Khan announced that the match would open the PPV.

On the October 24, 2024, episode of Dynamite, MVP handed a business card to Ricochet as part of an ongoing recruitment to join the newly formed stable The Hurt Syndicate. At Holiday Bash on December 18, MVP took back the card and tore it up, rescinding his offer. In July 2025, Gates of Agony (Bishop Kaun and Toa Liona), shortened their name to GOA and aligned with Ricochet. At Forbidden Door, they cost The Hurt Syndicate (Bobby Lashley and Shelton Benjamin) their AEW World Tag Team Championship by attacking them during their three-way tag team match. After Ricochet and GOA unsuccessfully challenged The Opps (Katsuyori Shibata, Powerhouse Hobbs, and Samoa Joe) for the AEW World Trios Championship on the August 27 episode of Dynamite, The Hurt Syndicate attacked Ricochet and GOA following the match. On the September 3 episode of Dynamite, Ricochet and GOA challenged The Hurt Syndicate to a trios match at All Out, which was later made official.

On the September 3, 2025, episode of Dynamite, Mercedes Moné defeated Alex Windsor to retain the AEW TBS Championship. After the match, Moné continued to attack Windsor until a returning Riho hit a double foot stomp off the top rope onto Moné to break it up. Riho then held up the TBS Championship, and a title match was later made official for All Out. Riho had previously been out of action since July 2024 after an arm injury and visa issues.

At Grand Slam on September 25, 2024, Jon Moxley defeated Darby Allin for Allin's AEW World Championship opportunity at WrestleDream. At New Year's Smash on December 27, 2024, Moxley and his stable Death Riders attacked Allin and threw him down a stairwell. Allin returned at All In on July 12, 2025, and attacked Moxley during Moxley's AEW World Championship defense in the main event, which he lost to "Hangman" Adam Page. At Forbidden Door, Allin teamed with Hiroshi Tanahashi, Will Ospreay, and Golden Lovers (Kenny Omega and Kota Ibushi) to defeat Gabe Kidd, Death Riders, and The Young Bucks (Matt Jackson and Nick Jackson) in a Lights Out Steel Cage match. On the August 27 episode of Dynamite, Allin issued a challenge to Moxley for a match at All Out. On the September 6 episode of Collision, Moxley accepted his challenge and said he would be putting Allin "in the ground". Later that night, it was announced that it would be a Coffin match.

At All In: Texas on July 12, 2025, Mark Briscoe and MJF entered first and second, respectively, in the men's Casino Gauntlet match. In the closing sequence, Briscoe delivered his finishing move, the Jay Driller, on Roderick Strong and attempted to pin him, but MJF threw Briscoe out of the ring and scored the pinfall himself, earning a future AEW World Championship match. On the August 6 episode of Dynamite, MJF defeated Briscoe in a grudge match. During the finish, MJF executed the Heatseeker on Briscoe, who placed his foot on the ropes. However, the referee failed to see it, and MJF was awarded the pinfall victory in a controversial finish. On the September 6 episode of Collision, MJF challenged Briscoe to a match and told him to choose a stipulation and location. Briscoe responded that he wanted the match to take place at All Out, but did not reveal the stipulation. On the September 13 episode of Collision, held during AEW’s multi-week residency at the 2300 Arena, Briscoe referenced Sabu and his history of putting opponents through tables. He then noted since AEW's broadcast deal is with TNT Sports (TBS, TNT, or TruTV), he wanted a "T&T" match. Briscoe subsequently called MJF a “generational prick” and revealed that the stipulation would be a Tables 'n' Tacks match.

On the September 3, 2025 episode of Dynamite, AEW World Champion "Hangman" Adam Page and Don Callis Family's AEW TNT Champion Kyle Fletcher were involved in an eight-man tag team match where Page's team defeated Fletcher's team. Following the match, Fletcher and his Don Callis Family stablemates attacked Page and his teammates. Fletcher would challenge Page to an AEW World Championship match at All Out on the September 6 episode of Collision, which was made official on the September 10 episode of Dynamite on the condition that the entire Don Callis Family were banned from ringside during the match. During the contract signing at September to Remember on September 17, Page revealed to Fletcher another stipulation in the contract; if any member of the Don Callis Family interfered, Fletcher would be disqualified and stripped of the TNT Championship.

== Reception ==
All Out garnered generally positive reviews, with high marks given towards the main event, Unified Championship bout, and the Tables 'n' Tacks match. Reviewing for tjrwrestling, John Canton gave the show a score of 7.75 out of 10, praising the Page/Fletcher and Table 'n' Tacks matches, calling it an "overall strong wrestling show", though noted five hours for ten matches was a little much. Writing for 411mania, Thomas Hall gave the show a score of 8 out of 10, stating that the big matches "delivered", but declared that AEW "have got to cut back on the garbarge wrestling/weapons stuff", feeling they were being overused. He noted that, regardless, the main event and Unified Championship matches were worth watching. Chris Mueller, writing for Bleacher Report, generally praised the event, saying that every match was "good to great", with the amount of "surprises that made it memorable", giving the show an overall score of A−.

The main event between 'Hangman' Adam Page and Kyle Fletcher for the AEW World Championship garnered general acclaim. Canton called the match "outstanding", and praising Fletcher's performance on the main stage. He did, however, feel the match ran a bit too long. Hall echoed this praise, stating that Fletcher "more than hung in there with a much bigger star". However, he felt that the usage of tables and weapons was a detriment to the overall match. Mueller noted the match was paced perfectly, with the big spots "meant something because they weren't just moving from one spot to the next." Reviewing for Voices of Wrestling, Suit Williams praised the match, calling it "the best of Hangman's reign so far" and "Maybe the best match of 2025."

== Results ==
No.	Results	Stipulations	Times
1^{P}	The Opps (Samoa Joe and Powerhouse Hobbs) defeated The WorkHorsemen (Anthony Henry and JD Drake) by submission	Tag team match	5:20
2^{P}	Daniel Garcia (with Marina Shafir) defeated Katsuyori Shibata by pinfall	Singles match	14:50
3^{P}	Hologram and Paragon (Kyle O'Reilly and Roderick Strong) defeated The Frat House (Cole Karter, Griff Garrison, and Preston Vance) (with Jacked Jameson) by pinfall	Trios match	3:20
4^{P}	Harley Cameron, Mina Shirakawa, Queen Aminata, and Willow Nightingale defeated Megan Bayne, Penelope Ford, and Sisters of Sin (Julia Hart and Skye Blue) by pinfall	Eight-woman Tornado Tailgate Brawl	11:30
5	Adam Copeland and Christian Cage defeated FTR (Cash Wheeler and Dax Harwood) (with Stokely) by pinfall	Tag team match	18:05
6	Eddie Kingston defeated Big Bill (with Bryan Keith) by pinfall	Singles match	7:20
7	Mark Briscoe defeated MJF by pinfall	Tables 'n' Tacks match	19:20
8	The Demand (Ricochet, Bishop Kaun, and Toa Liona) defeated The Hurt Syndicate (Bobby Lashley, Shelton Benjamin, and MVP) by pinfall	Trios match	13:45
9	Mercedes Moné (c) defeated Riho by pinfall	Singles match for the AEW TBS Championship	16:00
10	Kazuchika Okada (c) defeated Konosuke Takeshita and Máscara Dorada by pinfall	Three-way match for the AEW Unified Championship	21:00
11	Jon Moxley (with Marina Shafir) defeated Darby Allin	Coffin match	20:00
12	Kris Statlander defeated "Timeless" Toni Storm (c), Jamie Hayter, and Thekla by pinfall	Four-way match for the AEW Women's World Championship	11:55
13	Brodido (Brody King and Bandido) (c) defeated The Young Bucks (Matt Jackson and Nick Jackson), JetSpeed (Kevin Knight and "Speedball" Mike Bailey), and Don Callis Family (Hechicero and Josh Alexander)	Four-way Ladder match for the AEW World Tag Team Championship	24:40
14	"Hangman" Adam Page (c) defeated Kyle Fletcher by pinfall	Singles match for the AEW World Championship; Had any member of the Don Callis Family interfered, Fletcher would have been disqualified and stripped of his AEW TNT Championship.	38:10
(c) / – the champion(s) heading into the match; P / – the match was broadcast on the pre-show

=== Unified Championship Tournament ===
First round Collision (September 13); September to Remember (September 17)
Kazuchika Okada (c)	Pin
Michael Oku	9:15
Konosuke Takeshita	Pin
Anthony Bowens	9:10
Máscara Dorada	Pin
The Beast Mortos	10:05

Final; All Out (September 20)
Kazuchika Okada (c)	Pin
Konosuke Takeshita
Máscara Dorada	21:00
