= AEW Anniversary Show =

All Elite Wrestling television special series

- Promotions: All Elite Wrestling
- First event: 2020
- Event gimmick: Anniversary of the AEW Dynamite debut episode

AEW Anniversary Show is an annual professional wrestling television special produced by the American promotion All Elite Wrestling (AEW). Established in 2020, the event typically airs in October as a special episode of the promotion's flagship weekly program, Dynamite, commemorating the debut episode of the series in October 2019.

== History ==
On January 8, 2019, All Elite Wrestling (AEW) held its inaugural press conference, the Double or Nothing rally, outside TIAA Bank Field in Jacksonville, Florida, where the company is headquartered. On January 8, 2020, AEW marked the anniversary with a special edition of Dynamite. The first Dynamite Anniversary Show was held on October 14, 2020, at Daily's Place in Jacksonville, Florida, commemorating the debut episode of Dynamite on October 2, 2019. The October 2020 event was held behind closed doors due to the COVID-19 pandemic. Following the second Dynamite Anniversary Show on October 6, 2021, AEW held its Three Year Anniversary Show on May 25, 2022 at the Michelob Ultra Arena in Paradise, Nevada, as part of Double or Nothing weekend. The May 2022 event commemorated the debut of AEW’s inaugural event, Double or Nothing in May 2019. The first Collision Anniversary Show was held on June 15, 2024, commemorating the debut episode of Collision on June 17, 2023.

2026 is the first year to not have an AEW Anniversary Show in any capacity, as plans for the Dynamite 7th Anniversary Show were cancelled as a result of Pac's death on September 27, and the September 30 episode was instead presented as a tribute show dedicated to Pac.

== Events ==
#	Event	Date	City	Venue	Main event	Notes
1	Anniversary Edition	January 8, 2020	Southaven, Mississippi	Landers Center	Jurassic Express (Jungle Boy, Luchasaurus, and Marko Stunt) vs. Best Friends (Chuck Taylor, Trent Beretta, and Orange Cassidy)	Commemorating the anniversary of AEW’s official announcement on January 1, 2019
2	Dynamite 1st Anniversary Show	October 14, 2020	Jacksonville, Florida	Daily's Place	Jon Moxley (c) vs. Lance Archer in a No Disqualification match for the AEW World Championship	Commemorating the debut episode of AEW Dynamite on October 2, 2019
3	Dynamite 2nd Anniversary Show	October 6, 2021	Philadelphia, Pennsylvania	Liacouras Center	"Hangman" Adam Page vs. Andrade El Idolo vs. Jon Moxley vs. Lance Archer vs. Matt Hardy vs. Orange Cassidy vs. Pac in a Casino Ladder match to determine the number one contender for the AEW World Championship	
4	Three Year Anniversary	May 25, 2022	Paradise, Nevada	Michelob Ultra Arena	Samoa Joe vs. Kyle O'Reilly in a Owen Hart Foundation Men's Tournament semi-final match	Commemorating the debut of AEW’s inaugural event, Double or Nothing, on May 25, 2019
5	Dynamite 3rd Anniversary Show	October 5, 2022	Washington, D.C.	Entertainment & Sports Arena	Jericho Appreciation Society (Chris Jericho and Sammy Guevara) vs. Bryan Danielson and Daniel Garcia	
6	Dynamite 4th Anniversary Show	October 4, 2023	Stockton, California	Stockton Arena	Toni Storm vs. Skye Blue	
7	Collision 1st Anniversary Show	June 15, 2024	Youngstown, Ohio	Covelli Centre	House of Black (Malakai Black, Brody King, and Buddy Matthews) vs. Bang Bang Gang (Jay White, Austin Gunn, and Colten Gunn)	
8	Dynamite 5th Anniversary Show	October 2, 2024	Pittsburgh, Pennsylvania	Petersen Events Center	Bryan Danielson (c) vs. Kazuchika Okada for the AEW World Championship, with Okada's AEW Continental Championship also on the line for the first twenty minutes	
9	Dynamite 6th Anniversary Show	October 1, 2025	Hollywood, Florida	Hard Rock Live	Darby Allin and Kris Statlander vs. Death Riders (Wheeler Yuta and Marina Shafir)	
(c) – refers to the champion(s) heading into the match

== Results ==
=== 2020 ===
==== January ====
Anniversary Edition
- Promotional poster featuring Chris Jericho, Nick Jackson, Jon Moxley, Matt Jackson, and Cody
- Promotion: All Elite Wrestling
- Date: January 8, 2020
- City: Southaven, Mississippi
- Venue: Landers Center
- Attendance: 3,100

Anniversary Show chronology
← Previous; First	Next → Dynamite 1st Anniversary Show

Anniversary Edition was the inaugural Anniversary professional wrestling television special produced by All Elite Wrestling (AEW). It took place on January 8, 2020, at Landers Center in Southaven, Mississippi. The event commemorated the anniversary of AEW’s official announcement on January 1, 2019. The episode averaged 947,000 viewers on TNT, with a 0.36 rating in the 18-49 key demographic.

No.	Results	Stipulations	Times
1	"Hangman" Adam Page and Kenny Omega defeated Private Party (Isiah Kassidy and Marq Quen) by pinfall	Tag team match	12:25
2	Riho (c) defeated Kris Statlander by pinfall	Singles match for the AEW Women's World Championship	9:25
3	Sammy Guevara defeated Christopher Daniels by pinfall	Singles match	5:50
4	The Brotherhood (Cody and Dustin Rhodes) (with Arn Anderson) defeated Lucha Brothers (Pentagón Jr. and Rey Fénix) by pinfall	Tag team match	10:15
5	Jurassic Express (Jungle Boy, Luchasaurus, and Marko Stunt) defeated Best Friends (Chuck Taylor, Trent, and Orange Cassidy) by pinfall	Six-man tag team match	10:45
(c) / – the champion(s) heading into the match

==== October ====
Dynamite 1st Anniversary Show
- Promotional poster featuring various AEW wrestlers
- Promotion: All Elite Wrestling
- Date: October 14, 2020
- City: Jacksonville, Florida
- Venue: Daily's Place

Anniversary Show chronology
← Previous; Anniversary Edition	Next → Dynamite 2nd Anniversary Show

The 1st Dynamite Anniversary Show was a professional wrestling television special produced by All Elite Wrestling (AEW). It took place on October 14, 2020, at the promotion's home venue, Daily's Place in Jacksonville, Florida. The event commemorated the anniversary of the debut episode on October 2, 2019. The episode averaged 826,000 viewers on TNT, with a 0.30 rating in the 18-49 key demographic. Due to the COVID-19 pandemic in the United States, the event was in compliance with state and local regulations and CDC guidelines featuring physically distanced seating pods and limited crowds of 10-15 percent capacity in the open-air venue.

No.	Results	Stipulations	Times
1	FTR (Cash Wheeler and Dax Harwood) (c) (with Tully Blanchard) defeated Best Friends (Chuck Taylor and Trent)	Tag team match for the AEW World Tag Team Championship	16:35
2	Kip Sabian and Miro (with Penelope Ford) defeated Lee Johnson and Sean Maluta	Tag team match	1:55
3	Cody (c) (with Arn Anderson and Brandi Rhodes) vs. Orange Cassidy ended in a time limit draw	Singles match for the AEW TNT Championship	20:00
4	Hikaru Shida (c) defeated Big Swole	Singles match for the AEW Women's World Championship	8:55
5	Jon Moxley (c) defeated Lance Archer (with Jake Roberts)	No Disqualification match for the AEW World Championship	12:50
(c) / – the champion(s) heading into the match

=== 2021 ===
Dynamite 2nd Anniversary Show
- Promotion: All Elite Wrestling
- Date: October 6, 2021
- City: Philadelphia, Pennsylvania
- Venue: Liacouras Center
- Attendance: 7,100

Anniversary Show chronology
← Previous; Dynamite 1st Anniversary Show	Next → Three Year Anniversary

The 2nd Dynamite Anniversary Show was a professional wrestling television special produced by All Elite Wrestling (AEW). It took place on October 6, 2021, at Liacouras Center in Philadelphia, Pennsylvania. The event commemorated the 2nd anniversary of the debut episode on October 2, 2019. The episode averaged 1,053,000 viewers on TNT, with a 0.37 rating in the 18-49 key demographic. The event saw the debut of the AEW TBS Championship and the return of "Hangman" Adam Page.

No.	Results	Stipulations	Times
1	The Elite (Adam Cole, Kenny Omega, Matt Jackson, and Nick Jackson) (with Brandon Cutler and MT Nakazawa) defeated Bryan Danielson, Christian Cage, and Jurassic Express (Jungle Boy and Luchasaurus) (with Marko Stunt)	Eight-man tag team match	18:00
2	Sammy Guevara (c) defeated Bobby Fish	Singles match for the AEW TNT Championship	9:15
3	Darby Allin (with Sting) defeated Nick Comoroto (with Aaron Solo and QT Marshall)	Singles match	4:00
4	Serena Deeb defeated Hikaru Shida	Singles match	10:15
5	"Hangman" Adam Page defeated Andrade El Idolo, Jon Moxley, Lance Archer, Matt Hardy, Orange Cassidy, and Pac	Casino Ladder match to determine the number one contender for the AEW World Championship	17:10
(c) / – the champion(s) heading into the match

=== 2022 ===
==== May ====
Three Year Anniversary
- Promotional poster featuring various AEW wrestlers
- Promotion: All Elite Wrestling
- Date: May 25, 2022
- City: Paradise, Nevada
- Venue: Michelob Ultra Arena
- Attendance: 5,000

Anniversary Show chronology
← Previous; Dynamite 2nd Anniversary Show	Next → Dynamite 3rd Anniversary Show

Three Year Anniversary was a professional wrestling television special produced by All Elite Wrestling (AEW). It took place on May 25, 2022, at Michelob Ultra Arena in Paradise, Nevada, and served as the go-home show for Double or Nothing. The event commemorated the three year anniversary of AEW’s inaugural event, Double or Nothing, on May 25, 2019. The episode averaged 929,000 viewers on TBS, with a 0.35 rating in the 18-49 key demographic.

No.	Results	Stipulations	Times
1	Wardlow defeated Shawn Spears	Steel Cage match with MJF as special guest referee Since Wardlow won, he earned a match against MJF at Double or Nothing.	6:55
2	Eddie Kingston and Jon Moxley defeated Private Party (Isiah Kassidy and Marq Quen)	Tag team match	7:25
3	FTR (Cash Wheeler and Dax Harwood) (c) vs. Roppongi Vice (Rocky Romero and Trent Beretta) ended in a double disqualification	Tag team match for the ROH World Tag Team Championship	10:25
4	Swerve Strickland defeated Jungle Boy and Ricky Starks	Three-way match	9:35
5	Dr. Britt Baker, D.M.D. (with Jamie Hayter and Rebel) defeated Toni Storm	Women's Owen Hart Foundation Tournament Semifinal	9:00
6	Samoa Joe defeated Kyle O'Reilly by technical submission	Men's Owen Hart Foundation Tournament Semifinal	12:40
(c) / – the champion(s) heading into the match

==== October ====
Dynamite 3rd Anniversary Show
- Promotional poster featuring various AEW wrestlers
- Promotion: All Elite Wrestling
- Date: October 5, 2022
- City: Washington, D.C.
- Venue: Entertainment & Sports Arena
- Attendance: 3,300

Anniversary Show chronology
← Previous; Three Year Anniversary	Next → Dynamite 4th Anniversary Show

The 3rd Dynamite Anniversary Show was a professional wrestling television special produced by All Elite Wrestling (AEW). It took place on October 5, 2022, at Entertainment & Sports Arena in Washington, D.C. The event commemorated the 3rd anniversary of the debut episode on October 2, 2019. The episode averaged 1,038,000 viewers on TBS, with a 0.33 rating in the 18-49 key demographic.

No.	Results	Stipulations	Times
1	MJF defeated Wheeler Yuta by submission	Singles match	15:05
2	Darby Allin defeated Jay Lethal	Singles match	10:15
3	Wardlow (c) defeated Brian Cage (with Prince Nana)	Singles match for the AEW TNT Championship	10:05
4	Athena, Toni Storm, and Willow Nightingale (with Saraya) defeated Jamie Hayter, Penelope Ford, and Serena Deeb (with Dr. Britt Baker, D.M.D. and Rebel)	Trios match	9:30
5	"Hangman" Adam Page defeated Rush (with José the Assistant)	Singles match	9:05
6	Luchasaurus (with Christian Cage) defeated Fuego Del Sol	Singles match	0:20
7	Jericho Appreciation Society (Chris Jericho and Sammy Guevara) defeated Bryan Danielson and Daniel Garcia	Tag team match	14:25
(c) / – the champion(s) heading into the match

=== 2023 ===
Dynamite 4th Anniversary Show
- Promotional poster featuring Adam Copeland
- Promotion: All Elite Wrestling
- Date: October 4, 2023
- City: Stockton, California
- Venue: Stockton Arena
- Attendance: 3,825

Anniversary Show chronology
← Previous; Dynamite 3rd Anniversary Show	Next → Collision 1st Anniversary Show

The 4th Dynamite Anniversary Show was a professional wrestling television special produced by All Elite Wrestling (AEW). It took place on October 4, 2023, at Stockton Arena in Stockton, California. The event commemorated the 4th anniversary of the debut episode on October 2, 2019. The episode averaged 800,000 viewers on TBS, with a 0.28 rating in the 18-49 key demographic. The event featured the Dynamite debut of Adam Copeland, following his debut at WrestleDream.

No.	Results	Stipulations	Times
1	Rey Fénix (c) (with Alex Abrahantes and Penta El Zero Miedo) defeated Nick Jackson (with Matt Jackson)	Singles match for the AEW International Championship	13:45
2	Wardlow defeated Griff Garrison by referee stoppage	Singles match	1:00
3	Billy Gunn and The Acclaimed (Anthony Bowens and Max Caster) (c) defeated Kip Sabian and The Butcher and the Blade (with Penelope Ford)	Trios match for the AEW World Trios Championship	5:20
4	The Golden Jets (Chris Jericho and Kenny Omega) defeated Don Callis Family (Konosuke Takeshita and Kyle Fletcher)	Tag team match	15:15
5	Toni Storm defeated Skye Blue	Singles match	6:50
(c) / – the champion(s) heading into the match

=== 2024 ===
==== June ====
Collision 1st Anniversary Show
- Promotion: All Elite Wrestling
- Date: June 15, 2024
- City: Youngstown, Ohio
- Venue: Covelli Centre
- Attendance: 2,596

Anniversary Show chronology
← Previous; Dynamite 4th Anniversary Show	Next → Dynamite 5th Anniversary Show

The 1st Collision Anniversary Show was a professional wrestling television special produced by All Elite Wrestling (AEW). It took place on June 15, 2024, at Covelli Centre in Youngstown, Ohio. The event commemorated the anniversary of the debut episode on June 17, 2023. The episode averaged 435,000 viewers on TNT, with a 0.18 rating in the 18-49 key demographic.

No.	Results	Stipulations	Times
1	Blackpool Combat Club (Bryan Danielson, Claudio Castagnoli, Jon Moxley, and Wheeler Yuta) defeated Lio Rush, Rocky Romero, and TMDK (Mikey Nicholls and Shane Thorne)	Eight-man tag team match	13:20
2	Deonna Purrazzo defeated Thunder Rosa by referee stoppage	No Disqualification match	10:40
3	Hechicero (with Bishop Kaun and Toa Liona) defeated Dalton Castle	Singles match	3:50
4	Dante Martin defeated Lee Moriarty	AEW TNT Championship Forbidden Door Qualifying match	8:50
5	Kyle O'Reilly defeated Anthony Henry	Singles match	2:50
6	House of Black (Malakai Black, Brody King, and Buddy Matthews) defeated Bang Bang Gang (Jay White, Austin Gunn, and Colten Gunn)	Trios match	18:25

==== October ====
Dynamite 5th Anniversary Show
- Promotional poster featuring various AEW wrestlers
- Promotion: All Elite Wrestling
- Date: October 2, 2024
- City: Pittsburgh, Pennsylvania
- Venue: Petersen Events Center
- Attendance: 4,585

Anniversary Show chronology
← Previous; Collision 1st Anniversary Show	Next → Dynamite 6th Anniversary Show

The 5th Dynamite Anniversary Show was a professional wrestling television special produced by All Elite Wrestling (AEW). It took place on October 2, 2024, at Petersen Events Center in Pittsburgh, Pennsylvania. The event commemorated the 5th anniversary of the debut episode on October 2, 2019. The episode averaged 680,000 viewers on TBS, with a 0.20 rating in the 18-49 key demographic.

No.	Results	Stipulations	Times
1	Will Ospreay (c) vs. Ricochet ended in a no contest	Singles match for the AEW International Championship	17:40
2	"Hangman" Adam Page defeated Juice Robinson	Singles match	10:10
3	Dr. Britt Baker, D.M.D. defeated Serena Deeb	Singles match	11:35
4	Private Party (Quen and Zay) defeated Iron Savages (Beefcake Boulder and Bulk Bronson) (with Jacked Jameson)	Tag team match	1:05
5	Bryan Danielson (c–World) defeated Kazuchika Okada (c–Continental)	Singles match for the AEW World Championship; The AEW Continental Championship was on the line for the first twenty minutes only.	31:40
(c) / – the champion(s) heading into the match

=== 2025 ===
Dynamite 6th Anniversary Show
- Promotional poster featuring various AEW wrestlers
- Promotion: All Elite Wrestling
- Date: October 1, 2025
- City: Hollywood, Florida
- Venue: Hard Rock Live
- Attendance: 3,659

Anniversary Show chronology
← Previous; Dynamite 5th Anniversary Show	Next → —

AEW Dynamite special episodes chronology
← Previous; September to Remember	Next → Title Tuesday

The 6th Dynamite Anniversary Show was a professional wrestling television special produced by All Elite Wrestling (AEW). It took place on October 1, 2025, at Hard Rock Live in Hollywood, Florida. The event commemorated the 6th anniversary of the debut episode on October 2, 2019. The episode was simulcast on TBS and HBO Max with a special runtime of 2.5 hours. The event was notable for the brief return of Andrade El Ídolo and debut of El Clon.

No.	Results	Stipulations	Times
1	Kenny Omega and Brodido (Brody King and Bandido) defeated Josh Alexander and The Young Bucks (Matt Jackson and Nick Jackson) by pinfall	Trios match	16:40
2	Kyle Fletcher (c) (with Don Callis) defeated Orange Cassidy by pinfall	Singles match for the AEW TNT Championship	14:15
3	"Hangman" Adam Page and The Opps (Samoa Joe and Powerhouse Hobbs) defeated Death Riders (Jon Moxley, Claudio Castagnoli, and Daniel Garcia) by pinfall	Trios match	14:35
4	"Timeless" Toni Storm defeated Tay Melo (with Anna Jay) by pinfall	Singles match	7:50
5	GOA (Bishop Kaun and Toa Liona) (with Ricochet) defeated The Swirl (Blake Christian and Lee Johnson) by pinfall	Tag team match	8:00
6	Darby Allin and Kris Statlander defeated Death Riders (Wheeler Yuta and Marina Shafir) by pinfall	Mixed tornado tag team match	12:35
(c) / – the champion(s) heading into the match
