= AEW Title Tuesday =

All Elite Wrestling television special series

- AEW Title Tuesday logo
- Promotions: All Elite Wrestling
- Other name: Homecoming: Title Tuesday (2025)
- First event: 2022
- Event gimmick: Championship matches

AEW Title Tuesday is an annual professional wrestling television special produced by the American promotion All Elite Wrestling (AEW). Established in 2022, it is themed around championship matches and airs in October as a special episode of the promotion's flagship weekly program, Dynamite on TBS and simulcast on HBO Max beginning in 2025. Dynamite normally airs on Wednesdays but is moved to one Tuesday in October due to a scheduling conflict with Major League Baseball (MLB) postseason games in its regular time slot on TNT Sports channels. The 2025 event was simultaneously part one of the fifth Homecoming special, branded as Homecoming: Title Tuesday. Due to the special airing on Tuesday, it puts it head-to-head against WWE's NXT program.

== History ==
In August 2022, the American professional wrestling promotion All Elite Wrestling (AEW) announced that in October that year, their flagship television program, Dynamite, which normally airs on Wednesdays on TBS, would air on Tuesday, October 18, marking the first Tuesday edition of Dynamite since the "Late Night Dynamite" special on September 22, 2020. This one-night change was due to TBS's Major League Baseball (MLB) playoffs coverage. During the day of the event, with four championship matches scheduled for the card, AEW president Tony Khan branded the special episode as Title Tuesday. As a result of the episode airing on Tuesday, it put it head-to-head against rival company WWE and its NXT program for the first time since April 2021; from Dynamite's debut in October 2019, the show went head-to-head against NXT until the latter moved to Tuesdays in April 2021.

A second Title Tuesday was scheduled for October 10, 2023, thus establishing Title Tuesday as an annual television special of Dynamite. WWE would attempt to combat this by airing the first 30 minutes of NXT commercial-free. Title Tuesday again returned on October 8, 2024. NXT had moved to The CW the previous week, and WWE attempted to counter program AEW by making their CW debut a two-week special, with the second part airing against Title Tuesday.

For the 2025 event, which was scheduled for October 7, the special was simultaneously held as the fourth Title Tuesday and part one of the fifth Homecoming special, branded as Homecoming: Title Tuesday. Homecoming is one of AEW's other television specials in which the company returns to its home venue of Daily's Place in Jacksonville, Florida. This would also be the first Title Tuesday to be simulcast on TBS and HBO Max as AEW began simulcasting all of their television programs on Max in January 2025. WWE's counter programming attempt for this year was a special episode of NXT titled NXT vs. TNA Showdown, which was a cross promoted event between WWE's NXT brand and its partner promotion Total Nonstop Action Wrestling (TNA).

== Events ==
#	Year	Date	City	Venue	Main event	Ref.
1	Title Tuesday (2022)	October 18, 2022	Cincinnati, Ohio	Heritage Bank Center	Jon Moxley (c) vs. "Hangman" Adam Page for the AEW World Championship	
2	Title Tuesday (2023)	October 10, 2023	Independence, Missouri	Cable Dahmer Arena	Adam Copeland vs. Luchasaurus	
3	Title Tuesday (2024)	October 8, 2024	Spokane, Washington	Spokane Arena	Bryan Danielson and Wheeler Yuta vs. Blackpool Combat Club (Claudio Castagnoli and Pac)	
4	Homecoming: Title Tuesday	October 7, 2025	Jacksonville, Florida	Daily's Place	Orange Cassidy vs. Pac	
(c) – refers to the champion(s) heading into the match

== Results ==
=== 2022 ===
Title Tuesday
- Promotional poster featuring "Hangman" Adam Page and Jon Moxley
- Promotion: All Elite Wrestling
- Date: October 18, 2022
- City: Cincinnati, Ohio
- Venue: Heritage Bank Center
- Attendance: 4,519

AEW Dynamite special episodes chronology
← Previous; Grand Slam	Next → Winter Is Coming

Title Tuesday chronology
← Previous; First	Next → 2023

The 2022 Title Tuesday was the inaugural Title Tuesday television special and took place on October 18, 2022, at Heritage Bank Center in Cincinnati, Ohio; it was pre-empted from its usual timeslot by Game 1 of the American League Championship Series between the New York Yankees and Houston Astros. The show aired head-to-head against WWE's NXT.

Four matches were contested at the event. In the main event, Jon Moxley defeated "Hangman" Adam Page to retain the AEW World Championship and in the opening bout, Death Triangle (Pac, Penta El Zero Miedo, and Rey Fenix) defeated Best Friends (Chuck Taylor, Trent Beretta, and Orange Cassidy) to retain the AEW World Trios Championships. Other matches included Toni Storm defeating Hikaru Shida to retain the interim AEW Women's World Championship and Chris Jericho defeated Dalton Castle to retain the ROH World Championship.

No.	Results	Stipulations	Times
1	Death Triangle (Pac, Penta El Zero Miedo, and Rey Fenix) (c) defeated Best Friends (Chuck Taylor, Trent Beretta, and Orange Cassidy) by pinfall	Trios match for the AEW World Trios Championship	11:45
2	Toni Storm (c) defeated Hikaru Shida by pinfall	Singles match for the interim AEW Women's World Championship	8:45
3	Chris Jericho (c) defeated Dalton Castle (with Brandon and Brent Tate, Boy 3 and Boy 4) by pinfall	Singles match for the ROH World Championship	12:30
4	Jon Moxley (c) defeated "Hangman" Adam Page by referee stoppage	Singles match for the AEW World Championship	11:55
(c) / – the champion(s) heading into the match

=== 2023 ===
Title Tuesday
- Promotional poster featuring various AEW wrestlers
- Promotion: All Elite Wrestling
- Date: October 10, 2023
- City: Independence, Missouri
- Venue: Cable Dahmer Arena
- Attendance: 3,621

AEW Dynamite special episodes chronology
← Previous; Grand Slam	Next → Winter Is Coming

Title Tuesday chronology
← Previous; 2022	Next → 2024

The 2023 Title Tuesday was the second annual Title Tuesday television special and took place on October 10, 2023, at Cable Dahmer Arena in Independence, Missouri; it was pre-empted from its usual timeslot by Game 3 of the National League Division Series between the Los Angeles Dodgers and Arizona Diamondbacks. The show aired head-to-head against WWE's NXT, which aired its first 30 minutes commercial-free.

Seven matches were contested at the event, excluding one match which was contested on the buy-in and four matches taped for AEW's supplementary show Rampage. In the main event, Adam Copeland made his AEW debut and defeated Luchasaurus and in the opening bout, Bryan Danielson defeated Swerve Strickland, earning a guaranteed shot at the AEW TNT Championship. Other matches included Powerhouse Hobbs defeating Chris Jericho, Orange Cassidy defeating Rey Fenix to win his second AEW International Championship, and Hikaru Shida defeated Saraya to win her third AEW Women's World Championship.

No.	Results	Stipulations	Times
1^{P}	Eddie Kingston (c) defeated Minoru Suzuki by pinfall	Singles match for the ROH World Championship and Strong Openweight Championship	10:40
2	Bryan Danielson defeated Swerve Strickland by pinfall	Singles match for a future AEW TNT Championship match	16:10
3	Powerhouse Hobbs defeated Chris Jericho by pinfall (with Don Callis) by pinfall	Singles match	7:25
4	Orange Cassidy defeated Rey Fenix (c) by pinfall	Singles match for the AEW International Championship	5:00
5	Wardlow defeated Matt Sydal by referee stoppage	Singles match	0:50
6	Jay White (with Juice Robinson, Austin Gunn and Colten Gunn) defeated "Hangman" Adam Page by pinfall	Singles match	18:20
7	Hikaru Shida defeated Saraya (c) by pinfall	Singles match for the AEW Women's World Championship	11:20
8	Adam Copeland defeated Luchasaurus (with Christian Cage and Nick Wayne) by pinfall	Singles match	15:30
(c) / – the champion(s) heading into the match; P / – the match was broadcast on the pre-show

=== 2024 ===
Title Tuesday
- Promotional poster featuring various AEW wrestlers
- Promotion: All Elite Wrestling
- Date: October 8, 2024
- City: Spokane, Washington
- Venue: Spokane Arena
- Attendance: 1,891

AEW Dynamite special episodes chronology
← Previous; Dynamite's 5 Year Anniversary	Next → Fright Night Dynamite

Title Tuesday chronology
← Previous; 2023	Next → 2025

The 2024 Title Tuesday was the third annual Title Tuesday television special and took place on October 8, 2024, at Spokane Arena in Spokane, Washington; it was pre-empted from its usual timeslot by Game 3 of the American League Division Series between the New York Yankees and Kansas City Royals. The show aired head-to-head against WWE's NXT, which was part two of its debut on The CW.

Five matches were contested at the event, excluding five matches on AEW's supplementary show Rampage. In the main event, Bryan Danielson and Wheeler Yuta defeated Blackpool Combat Club (Claudio Castagnoli and Pac) and in the opening bout, Hologram defeated Komander. Also on the card, Willow Nightingale defeated Jamie Hayter, Nyla Rose, and Saraya to challenge Mariah May at WrestleDream for her AEW Women's World Championship.

No.	Results	Stipulations	Times
1	Hologram defeated Komander by pinfall	Singles match	12:00
2	Willow Nightingale defeated Jamie Hayter, Nyla Rose, and Saraya (with Harley Cameron) by pinfall	Four-way match for the AEW Women's World Championship match at WrestleDream	11:25
3	Jay White defeated Cody Chhun by pinfall	Singles match	2:50
4	Mercedes Moné (c) defeated Emi Sakura by submission	Singles match for the AEW TBS Championship and NJPW Strong Women's Championship	10:10
5	Bryan Danielson and Wheeler Yuta defeated Blackpool Combat Club (Claudio Castagnoli and Pac) by pinfall	Tag team match	15:20
(c) / – the champion(s) heading into the match

=== 2025 ===
Homecoming: Title Tuesday
- Promotional poster featuring various AEW wrestlers
- Promotion: All Elite Wrestling
- Date: October 7, 2025
- City: Jacksonville, Florida
- Venue: Daily's Place
- Attendance: 2,885

Title Tuesday chronology
← Previous; 2024	Next → —

Homecoming chronology
← Previous; January 2025	Next → —

AEW Dynamite special episodes chronology
← Previous; Dynamite 6th Anniversary Show	Next → Fright Night Dynamite

The 2025 Title Tuesday, also promoted as Homecoming: Title Tuesday, was the fourth annual Title Tuesday television special, and simultaneously part one of the fifth Homecoming special, which took place on October 7, 2025, at Daily's Place in Jacksonville, Florida; Homecoming is one of AEW's other specials in which the company returns to its home venue of Daily's Place. For the first time for the special, it was simulcast on TBS and the streaming service HBO Max with a special runtime of 2.5 hours. The show aired head-to-head against WWE's NXT, which was broadcast as a special episode called NXT vs. TNA Showdown.

No.	Results	Stipulations	Times
1	Jon Moxley (with Marina Shafir) defeated Tomohiro Ishii by referee stoppage	Singles match	12:50
2	The Hurt Syndicate (Bobby Lashley, Shelton Benjamin, and MVP) defeated The Demand (Ricochet, Bishop Kaun, and Toa Liona) by pinfall	Street Fight	16:40
3	Jurassic Express (Jack Perry and Luchasaurus) defeated Orion and KM by pinfall	Tag team match	2:40
4	Kyle Fletcher (c) defeated Kyle O'Reilly by pinfall	Singles match for the AEW TNT Championship	12:50
5	Mercedes Moné (c) defeated Lacey Lane by pinfall	Singles match for the AEW TBS Championship; This was an open challenge.	9:40
6	Don Callis Family (Konosuke Takeshita and Kazuchika Okada) defeated Brodido (Brody King and Bandido) by pinfall	Double Jeopardy Eliminator match Had Brodido won, whoever got the pin would have earned a future AEW Continental Championship match. Since Takeshita and Okada won, they earned a future AEW World Tag Team Championship match.	11:50
7	Orange Cassidy defeated Pac by pinfall	Singles match	15:00
(c) / – the champion(s) heading into the match

== See also ==
- List of All Elite Wrestling special events
- List of AEW Collision special episodes
- List of AEW Dynamite special episodes
- Wednesday Night Wars
