= AEW Dynamite debut episode =

Professional wrestling television special

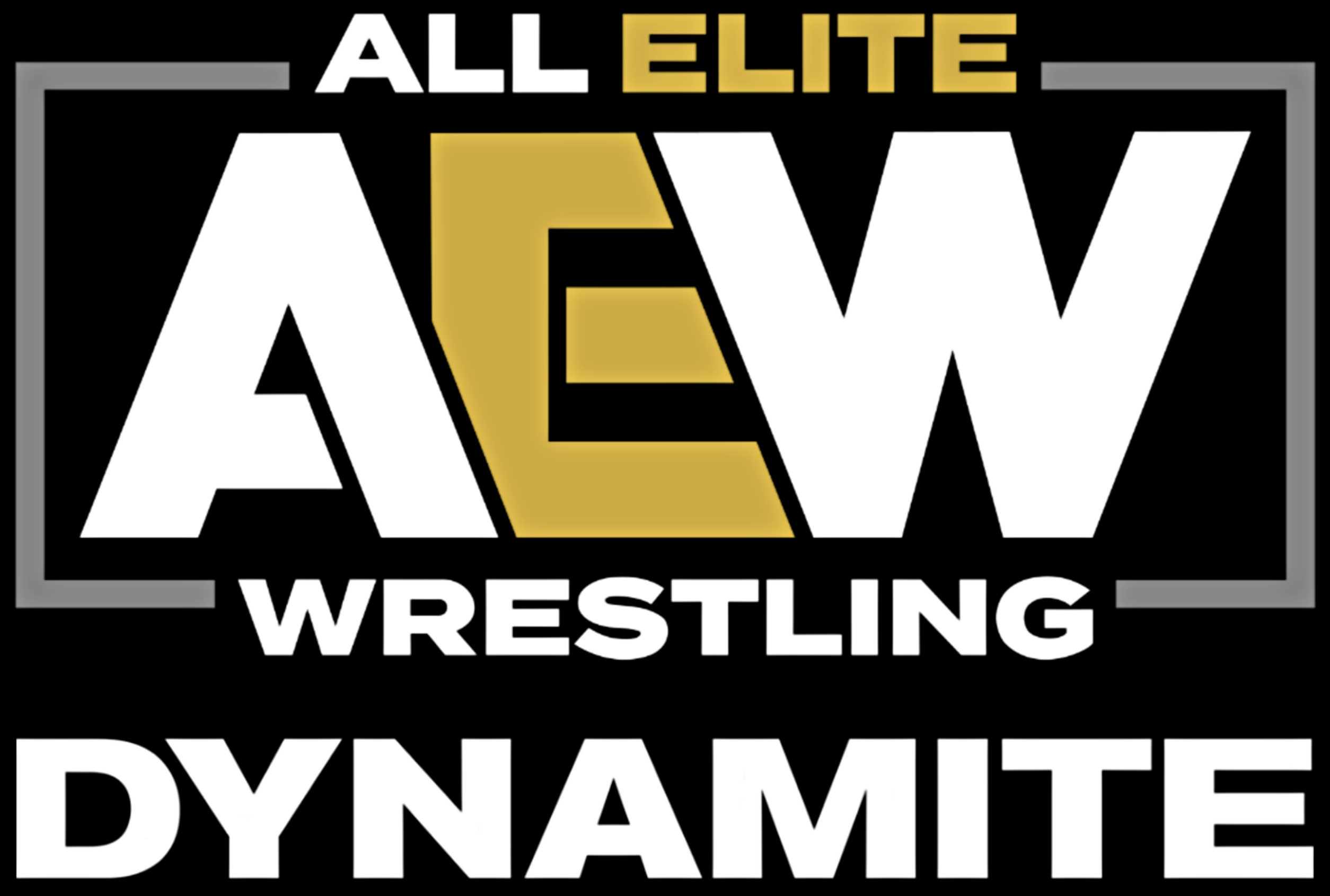
- The debut AEW Dynamite logo
- Promotion: All Elite Wrestling
- Brand: Dynamite
- Date: October 2, 2019
- City: Washington, D.C.
- Venue: Capital One Arena
- Attendance: 14,129

Dynamite special episodes chronology
← Previous; First	Next → Thanksgiving Eve Dynamite

The AEW Dynamite Debut episode was the pilot episode for the American television program AEW Dynamite, produced by the professional wrestling promotion of All Elite Wrestling. The show took place on October 2, 2019, and was broadcast live on TNT from the Capital One Arena in Washington, D.C. The event marked the first time a professional wrestling event aired on TNT since the final episode of WCW Monday Nitro aired on March 26, 2001.

== Storylines ==
The event included matches that resulted from scripted storylines, where wrestlers portrayed heroes, villains, or less distinguishable characters in scripted events that built tension and culminated in a wrestling match or series of matches. Results were predetermined by AEW's writers.

== Event ==
Jim Ross, Excalibur and Tony Schiavone introduced the debut of episode as part of the commentary team. The team announced a number of matches including "Hangman" Adam Page vs. Pac, The Young Bucks and Kenny Omega vs. Chris Jericho, Santana and Ortiz, and the inaugural AEW Women's World Championship match between Riho and Nyla Rose.

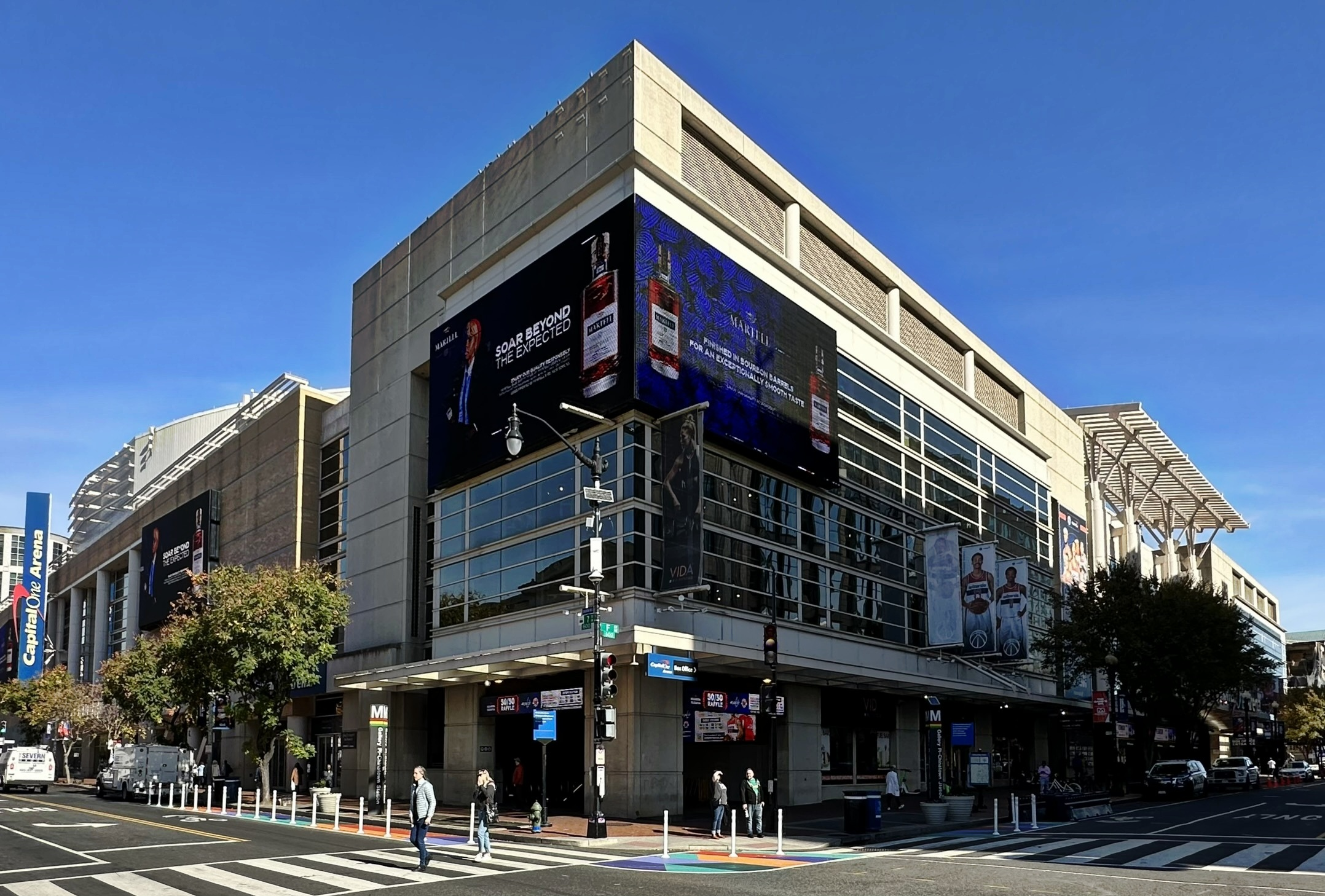
The Capital One Arena

== Reception ==
The inaugural episode of Dynamite had 1,409,000 viewers, being 16th most viewed cable show and the 2nd most viewed show for the 18-49 key demo.

== Results ==
No.	Results	Stipulations	Times
1	Cody Rhodes (with Brandi Rhodes) defeated Sammy Guevara	Singles match	11:53
2	MJF defeated Brandon Cutler	Singles match	2:55
3	Pac defeated Hangman Page	Singles match	13:02
4	Riho defeated Nyla Rose	Singles match for the inaugural AEW Women's World Championship	13:26
5	Chris Jericho, Santana and Ortiz defeated The Elite (The Young Bucks (Matt Jackson and Nick Jackson) and Kenny Omega)	Six-man tag team match	12:29

== See also ==
- AEW Anniversary Show
