= Canada Life Place =

Sports and entertainment centre in London, Ontario

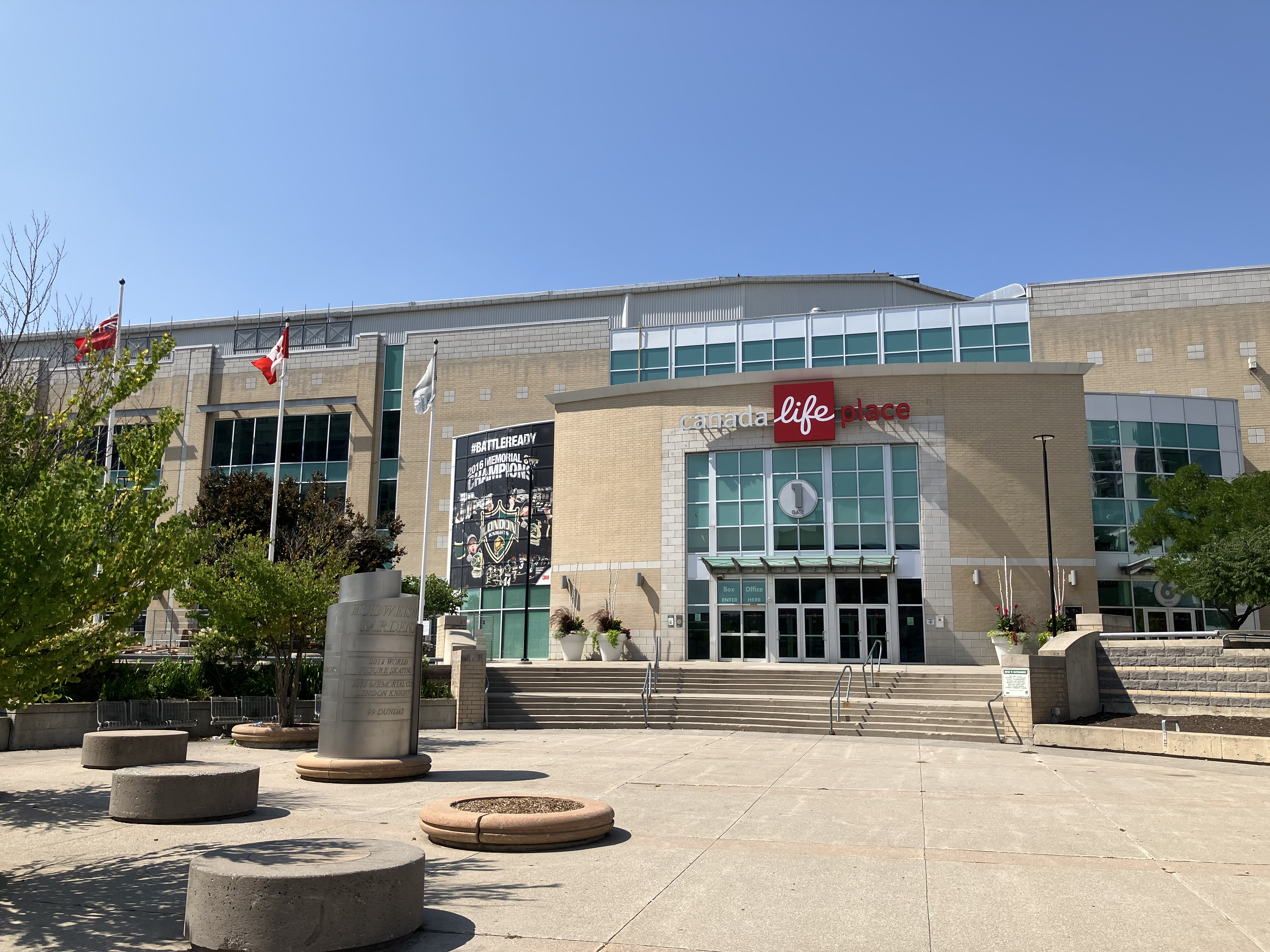
- Canada Life Place in 2025

- Location within Ontario Location within Canada
- Former names: John Labatt Centre (2002–2012); Budweiser Gardens (2012–2024)
- Address: 99 Dundas Street
- Location: London, Ontario, Canada
- Coordinates: 42°58′57″N 81°15′9″W
- Owner: London Civic Centre Corporation
- Operator: Global Spectrum
- Capacity: 9,036 - Hockey; 9,000 - End stage concert 3,200 - Theatre mode (smaller concert); 2,800 - Theatre mode (with proscenium); 10,200 - Centre stage concert
- Surface: 200 ft × 85 ft (61 m × 26 m)

Construction
- Groundbreaking: March 2001
- Opened: October 11, 2002
- Cost: $42 million, plus $10 million for land
- Architect: Brisbin Brook Beynon Architects (BBB Architects)
- Project managers: Trinity Planning & Projects Consulting
- Structural engineers: VanBoxmeer & Stranges
- Services engineers: The Mitchell Partnership, Inc.
- General contractor: EllisDon

Tenants
- London Knights (OHL) (2002–present); London Lightning (NBL Canada, BSL) (2011–2025); Western Mustangs-Men's Hockey (CIS) (2005–2007)

Website
- https://www.canadalifeplace.com/

Canada Life Place is a sports-entertainment centre, in London, Ontario, Canada – the largest such centre in Southwestern Ontario. It was previously named John Labatt Centre and Budweiser Gardens.

Opened as the John Labatt Centre in 2002, it was named after John Labatt, founder of the Labatt brewery in London. The centre's name was changed to Budweiser Gardens (after Labatt's sister brand in AB InBev) in Fall 2012. Naming rights of the stadium were attained by Canada Life, and finalized in October 2024.

The centre was built to be the new downtown home of London's Ontario Hockey League team, the London Knights, replacing the 40-year-old London Ice House in the south end of the city, near Highway 401.

== Ownership and management ==
The arena is leased from the City of London by the London Civic Centre Corporation in a public-private partnership. The London Civic Centre Corporation is owned in turn by EllisDon and Global Spectrum, the Philadelphia-based subsidiary of Comcast the American cable company. Global Spectrum manages the arena, and operates more than 100 other arenas.

=== Seating and ticketing ===
Approximate capacities:

- 9,046 - Hockey
- 9,000 - End stage concert
- 3,200 - Theatre mode (smaller concert)
- 2,800 - Theatre mode (with proscenium)
- 10,200 - Centre stage concert

In addition to the standard end stage configuration for large concerts, the arena can be set up to accommodate touring Broadway shows or smaller concerts in its theatre mode. The theatre mode features a small, intimate atmosphere and a 30-line fly grid to suspend scenery or lighting and sound.

When the sports-entertainment centre was originally being planned, estimates for sports seating were as low as 6,500 and high as 12,000 before settling on the original 9,090. It was decided due to several smaller arenas in the 4,000 to 7,000 range struggling financially and the cost on construction nearly doubling to have 12,000 or more seats. The sports-entertainment centre features 38 luxury suites and 1,100 club seats.

== Cost and construction ==
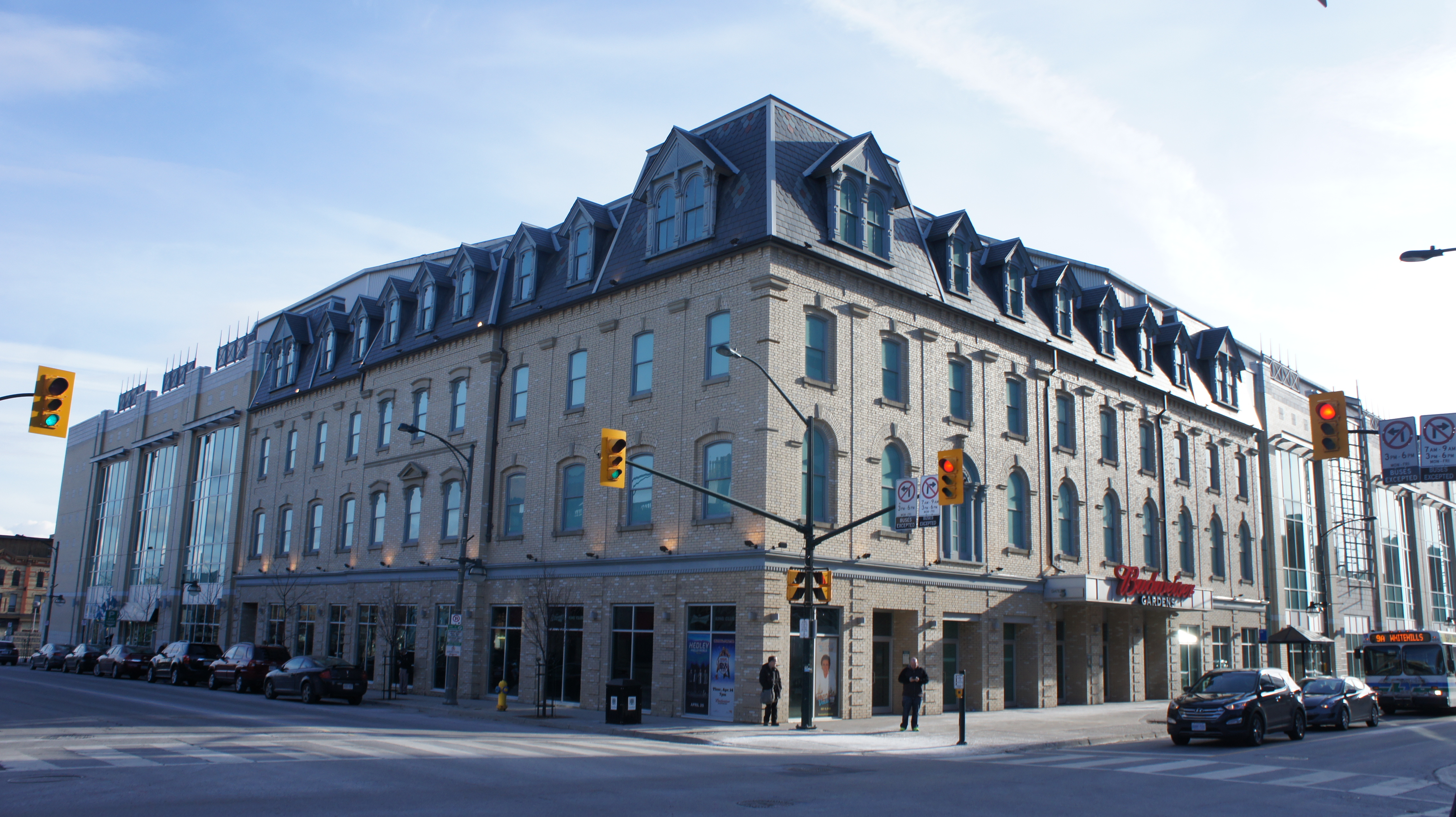
The north-east corner of Canada Life Place at Dundas and Talbot streets. This corner of the building is a replica of the facade of the now-demolished Talbot Inn, which stood here for more than 125 years.

John Labatt Centre was built at a cost of approximately $42 million by the London, Ontario-based construction company EllisDon Corp., builders of Toronto's Rogers Centre. The City of London contributed $32 million for arena construction and $10 million to purchase the land, while the London Civic Centre Corporation added $9.5 million to the arena's construction.

The sports-entertainment centre was originally named the John Labatt Centre, after the Labatt Brewing Company which has a production plant in London, until 2012 when their 10-year naming rights expired. The Labatt Brewing Company had an exclusive first rights on a second deal and could change the name if they chose, which they did, to Budweiser Gardens to further promote the main brand of their sister corporation, Anheuser-Busch. The original deal was $5-million for 10 years and the deal signed in 2012 was $6.4 million for 10 years. Global Spectrum, which manages the sports-entertainment centre, was selected by the City of London to choose the naming rights and they used a subsidiary called Front Row Marketing. Proceeds from naming rights are put into the net revenue, though the exact divide of the amount going to the City of London and Global Spectrum is unknown.

== Sporting events ==
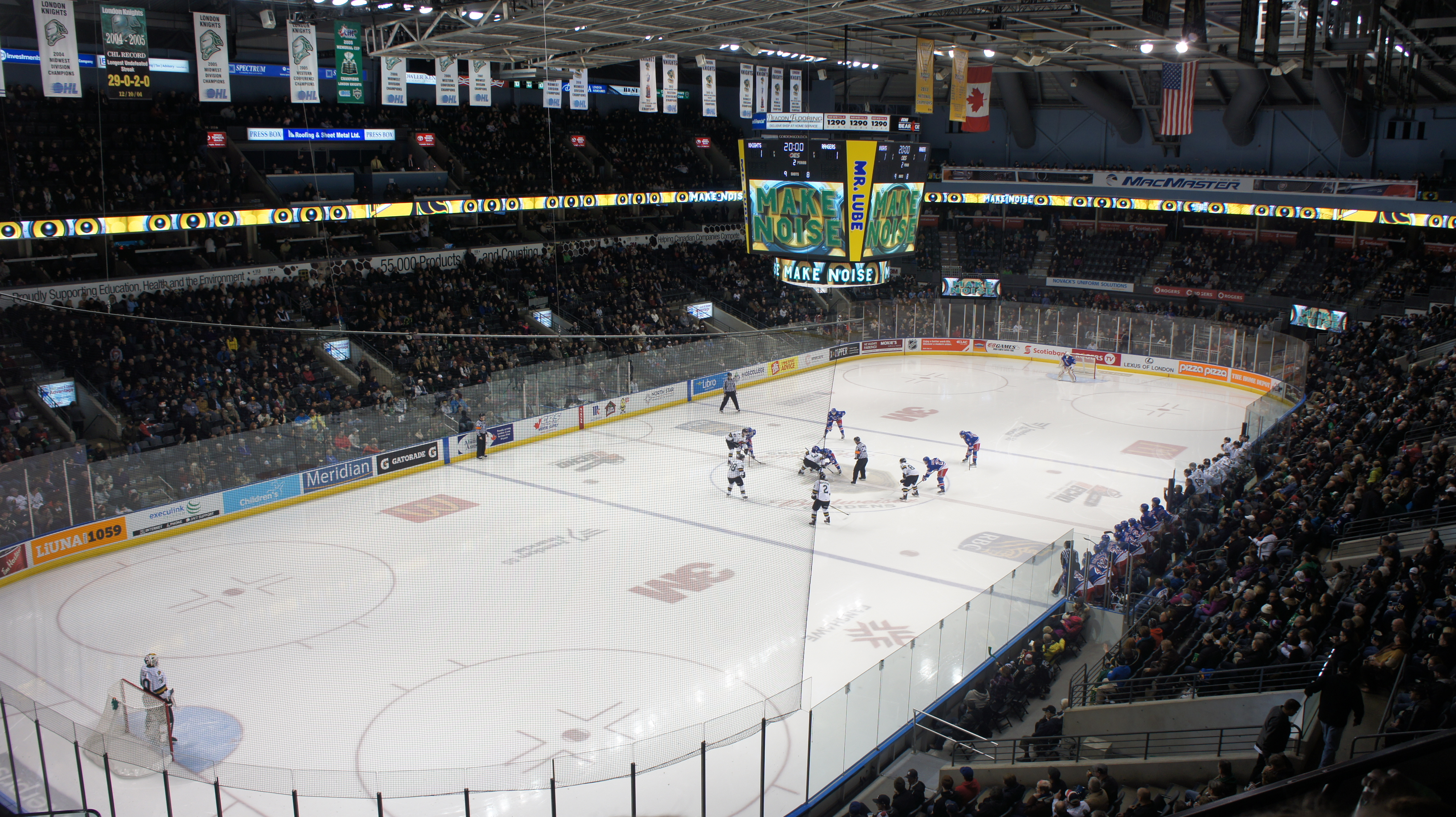
Arena interior in 2015

Within a few years of opening, the London Knights had a championship season in 2004–05, winning both the OHL Championship and Memorial Cup on home ice, and the JLC was well positioned to take maximum advantage of the team's popularity and success. The arena would go on to see the Knights win the 2012, 2013, and 2025 OHL championships on home ice (in addition to their wins in 2016 and 2024, which came on the road).

The John Labatt Centre hosted the 2005 Memorial Cup, the Canadian Hockey League's national major junior championship series, which the Knights also won after winning the OHL championship. The arena also hosted the 2014 Memorial Cup, in which the Edmonton Oil Kings were champions defeating the Guelph Storm by a score of 6–3.

The University of Western Ontario Mustangs hockey team used the John Labatt Centre as their home arena from 2005 until 2007. They have since moved back to Thompson Arena on Western's campus.

In addition to hockey, the London Lightning professional basketball team used the arena from 2011 to 2025.

Canada Life Place has been host to national-level events, such as the 2005 Canadian Figure Skating Championships, the 2006 Scott Tournament of Hearts (curling), the 2007 World Synchronized Skating Championships, the 2011 and 2023 Tim Hortons Brier (curling), as well as a wide variety of family entertainment such as Disney on Ice, the Harlem Globetrotters, Monster Jam (extreme motorsports) and Stars on Ice. It also hosted an international jousting tournament two years in a row, and the World Figure Skating Championships in 2013. The arena also hosted an NHL preseason game on September 22, 2014, between the Philadelphia Flyers and the Toronto Maple Leafs, which the Maple Leafs won 3–2 in a shootout.

== Other events ==
The arena has also hosted many other well known artists and Broadway Shows. Canada Life Place was launched as a concert venue with Cher's "Living Proof: The Farewell Tour" in 2002. The tour returned for an encore performance in 2005. Sum 41 recorded their live album Go Chuck Yourself from their tour of the same name here on April 11, 2005. In 2007, Meat Loaf's "3 Bats Live" DVD from the "Seize The Night" tour was recorded here. Cirque du Soleil chose Canada Life Place to stage its first-ever arena show, a rebuilt production of Saltimbanco. Sting performed during his Symphonicities Tour on July 21, 2010, along with the Royal Philharmonic Orchestra.

In 2010, Canada Life Place was awarded as the Canadian Venue of the Year at the Canadian Music and Broadcast Industry Awards.

The arena hosted the 2019 Juno Awards on March 17, 2019.

On March 30, 2024, the arena hosted All Elite Wrestling for a live television broadcast of AEW Collision and taped episodes for AEW Rampage and Ring of Honor's Ring of Honor Wrestling. On September 17, 2025, AEW returns to the arena with September to Remember, featuring AEW Dynamite and Collision.
