= Don Callis Family =

Professional wrestling stable

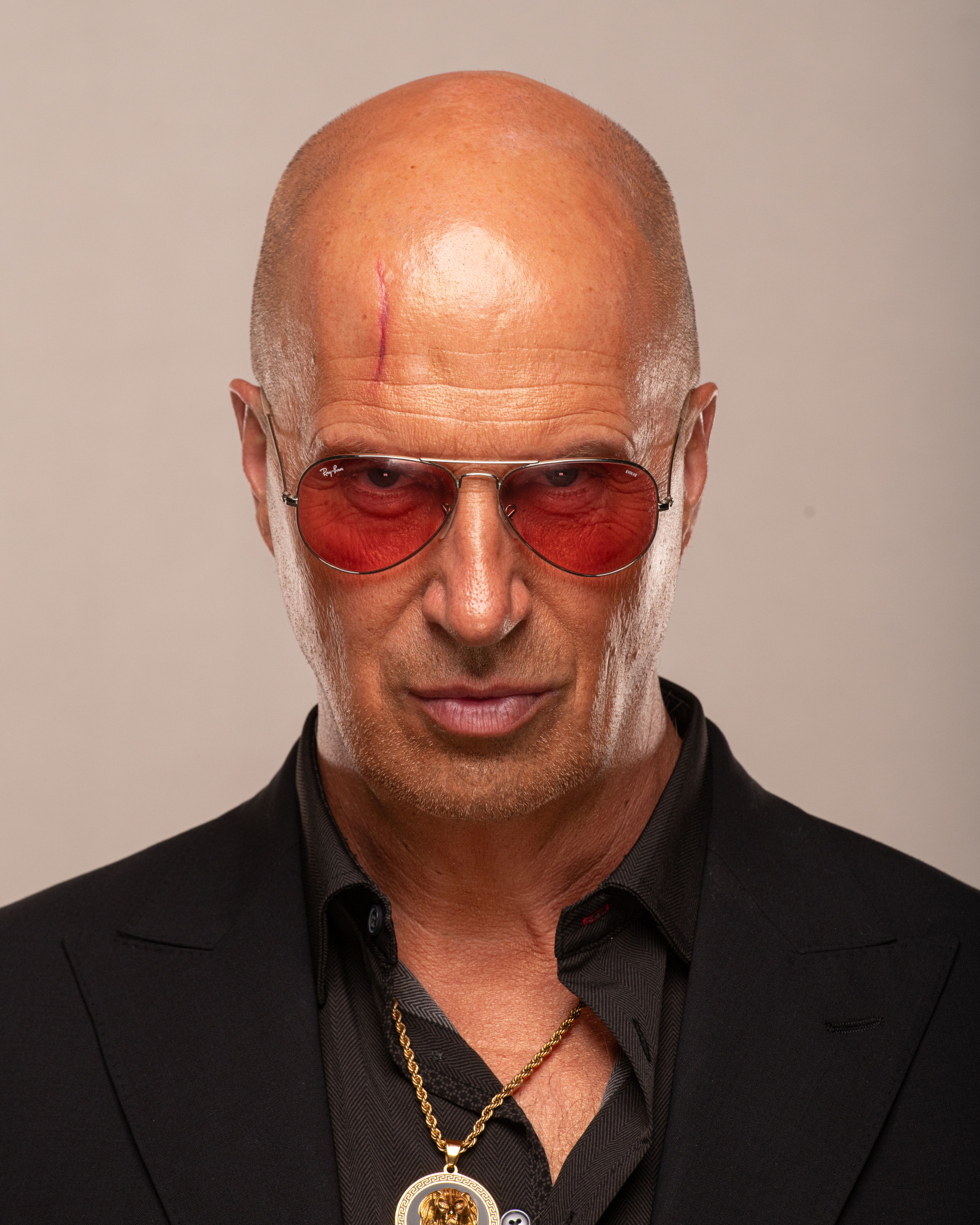
- Don Callis, the stable's founder, leader, and manager

Stable
- Leader: Don Callis (manager)
- Members: See below
- Former members: See below
- Debut: May 28, 2023
- Years active: 2023–present

The Don Callis Family is a villainous professional wrestling stable led and managed by Canadian wrestling manager Don Callis. They predominantly perform in All Elite Wrestling (AEW) as well as its sister promotion Ring of Honor (ROH). They also make appearances in AEW's partner promotions Consejo Mundial de Lucha Libre (CMLL), Maple Leaf Pro Wrestling (MLP), and New Japan Pro-Wrestling (NJPW).

The stable holds championships across three professional wrestling promotions (AEW, CMLL, and MLP). Kazuchika Okada is the reigning AEW International Champion, Hechicero is the reigning CMLL World Heavyweight Champion, Volador Jr. is the NWA World Historic Middleweight Champion, and Josh Alexander is the reigning MLP Canadian Champion.

== History ==
=== All Elite Wrestling / Ring of Honor (2023–present) ===
==== Formation; feuds with Kenny Omega and Chris Jericho (2023–2024) ====
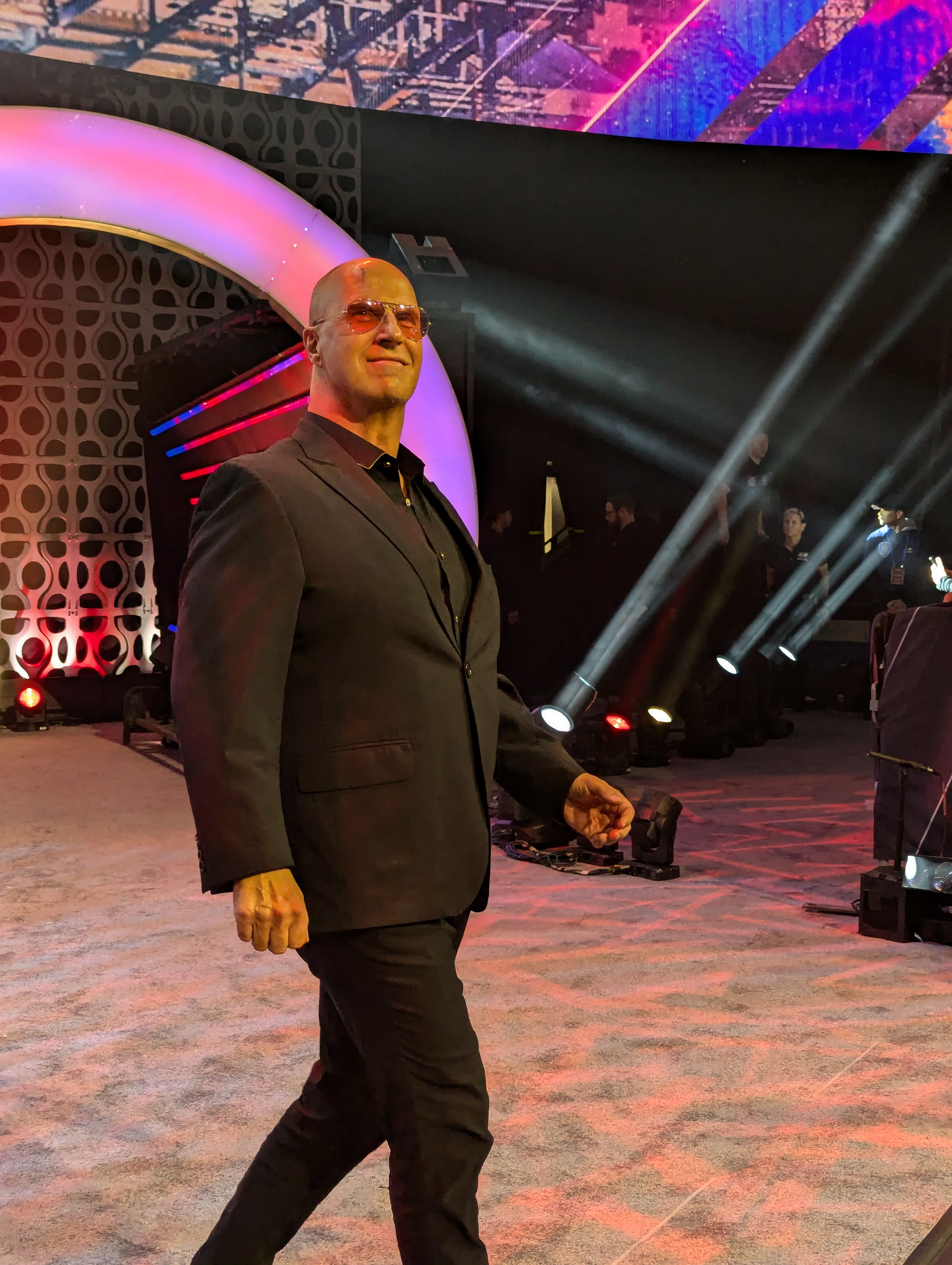
Don Callis, founding member, leader, manager, and namesake of the stable

On the May 10, 2023 episode of Dynamite, during a steel cage match between Kenny Omega and Jon Moxley, Callis turned on Omega, stabbing him with a screwdriver which allowed Moxley to get the win. At Double or Nothing, Callis allied himself with Konosuke Takeshita, after he delivered a jumping knee strike to Omega. In June 2023, Will Ospreay joined The Don Callis Family. At Grand Slam, Callis recruited Sammy Guevara to his family, after he turned on Chris Jericho.

On October 1 at WrestleDream, the Don Callis Family defeated, Omega, Jericho, and Kota Ibushi. In the same month, Powerhouse Hobbs and Kyle Fletcher joined the Don Callis Family. On December 15 at Final Battle, Fletcher won a Survival of the Fittest to win the vacant ROH World Television Championship, thus making it his first ever singles championship. On the December 28, 2023 episode of Dynamite, Guevara returned and crashed The Don Callis Family's Boxing Week Celebration. Callis got Guevara a custom portrait with his new baby and his family, but Guevara turned on Callis and the family attacked Guevara until Jericho made the save. At Worlds End on December 30, Takeshita and Hobbs teamed with Ricky Starks and Big Bill in a losing effort to Jericho, Guevera, Sting, and Darby Allin. On the February 7, 2024 episode of Dynamite, Takeshita defeated Jericho, ending their feud and avenging his previous loss to him in DDT.

==== Expansion and championship reigns (2024–present) ====
In 2024, Trent Beretta, Rush, Lance Archer and Brian Cage joined the Don Callis Family,, while Ospreay and Hobbs left the stable. On October 12 at WrestleDream, Takeshita defeated Ospreay and Ricochet in a three-way match to win the International Championship for the first time and his first championship in AEW after Fletcher interfered and turned on Ospreay.

In 2025, the stable included Mark Davis, Josh Alexander, Rocky Romero, Hechicero, and Kazuchika Okada. While Takeshita lost the title to Kenny Omega at Revolution, Okada defeated Omega at All In: Texas to become the inaugural AEW Unified Champion while also retaining the AEW Continental Championship and winning the AEW International Championship. On the July 31 episode of Collision, Fletcher defeated Dustin Rhodes in a Chicago Street Fight to win the AEW TNT Championship, retaining the title until Full Gear on November 22. On October 1 at the sixth anniversary episode of Dynamite, Andrade El Idolo and El Clon joined the Don Callis Family, but on October 16, it was reported by the Wrestling Observer Newsletter that Andrade was taken off television after WWE sent a cease-and-desist letter to AEW that claimed that his AEW return violated a non-compete clause that took effect upon his termination. At On November 29, Andrade was quietly removed as a Don Callis Family member after he revealed that he had never signed a contract with AEW, leaving his status with the company unknown. After Full Gear, Okada lost to Jon Moxley in the 2025 Continental Classic finals, ending his record-setting reign as Continental Champion at 647 days and was also forced to vacate the Unified Championship, ending that reign at 168 days.

Starting 2026, Jake Doyle joined the stable and Andrade would re-join, and several members won more titles: Fletcher defeated Tommaso Ciampa to win back the AEW TNT Championship, The team of Okada, Fletcher, and Davis defeated Jet Set Rodeo ("Hangman" Adam Page, "Speedball" Mike Bailey, and Kevin Knight) to win the AEW World Trios Championship, but lost it at Revolution on March 15, to Bailey, Knight, and Místico, ending their reign at 11 days. On March 30, Volador Jr. joined the Don Callis Family. On April 8, AEW president Tony Khan announced that Fletcher would be forced to relinquish the TNT Championship due to a meniscus injury, ending his second reign at 56 days. On May 9 at Fairway to Hell, Davis defeated Jack Perry to win the AEW National Championship, marking his first singles title in AEW. Cage returned from injury on the May 13, 2026 episode of Dynamite, unsuccessfully challenging Kevin Knight for the TNT Championship. At Double or Nothing on May 24, Takeshita defeated Okada to win the International Championship for a record-tying second time. Following the match, Takeshita was kicked out of the Don Callis Family by a returning Kyle Fletcher. On the June 3 episode of Dynamite, the reigning TNT Champion Kevin Knight joined the Don Callis Family. At Forbidden Door on June 28, members of the stable and MJF were defeated by Mark Briscoe's team in a steel cage match after Andrade betrayed his team, leaving the Don Callis Family. On July 8 at Dynamite: Beach Break, Fletcher defeated Takeshita to win the International Championship and bringing it back to the Don Callis Family. On July 26 at Redemption, Davis lost his title to Andrade, ending his reign at 78 days. At All In on August 30, Okada defeated Fletcher and Takeshita in a three-way match to regain the International Championship, while Knight lost the TNT Championship to Darby Allin in a Falls Count Anywhere match. On the September 30 Tribute to Pac memorial, Wardlow made his AEW return and teamed with Lance Archer, Jake Doyle, Josh Alexander, and Mark Davis in a losing effort against the Death Riders (Bryan Danielson, Claudio Castagnoli, Wheeler Yuta, Daniel Garcia, and Gabe Kidd).

=== Other promotions (2024–present) ===
Due to AEW's working relationships, Don Callis Family members have also appeared on other promotions, like New Japan Pro-Wrestling (NJPW) and Consejo Mundial de Lucha Libre (CMLL). Takeshita has worked for NJPW since 2024, winning the G1 Climax 35 in August 2025, and defeating Zack Sabre Jr. to win the IWGP World Heavyweight Championship in October that same year. He held the title until Wrestle Kingdom 20 in January 2026, where he lost it to Yota Tsuji but defeated El Phantasmo weeks later to win the NJPW World Television Championship. Andrade also worked for NJPW since 2025, winnning the IWGP Global Heavyweight Championship on night 1 of Wrestling Dontaku from Tsuji in May 2026. Hechicero also won the CMLL World Heavyweight Championship when he defeated Claudio Castagnoli at CMLL's Homenaje a Dos Leyendas in March 2026. On June 14 at Dominion 6.14 in Osaka-jo Hall, Andrade lost the IWGP Global Heavyweight Championship to Shota Umino. On July 3, Volador Jr. defeated Flip Gordon to win the NWA World Historic Middleweight Championship. On October 3 at MLP Northern Rising, Alexander defeated Stu Grayson to become the undisputed MLP Canadian Champion. Hechicero lost the CMLL World Heavyweight Championship to Zack Sabre Jr. at Lucha Kingdom on November 16, ending his reign at 221 days.

== Members ==
Don Callis Family
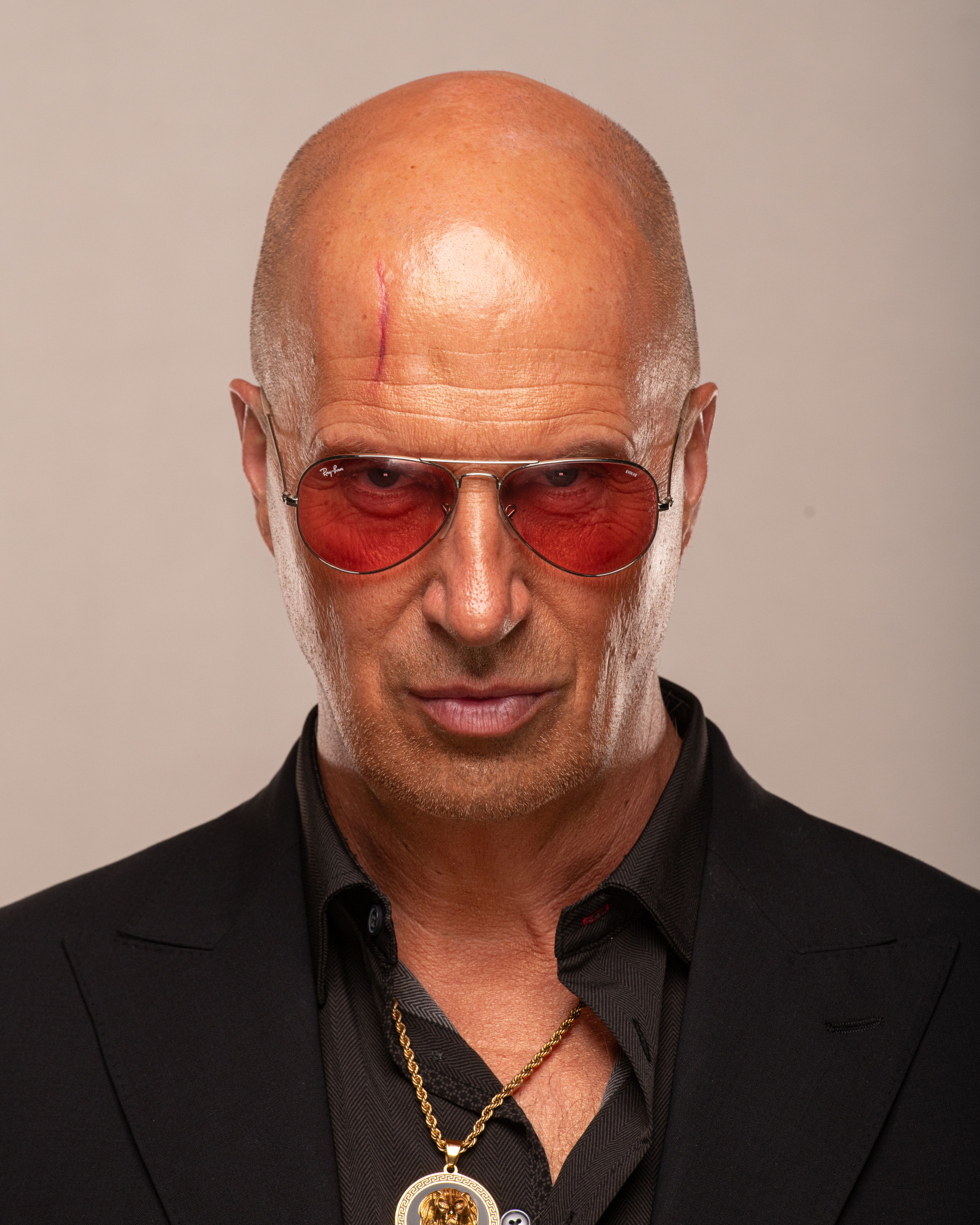
Don Callis (L/M)

Kyle Fletcher

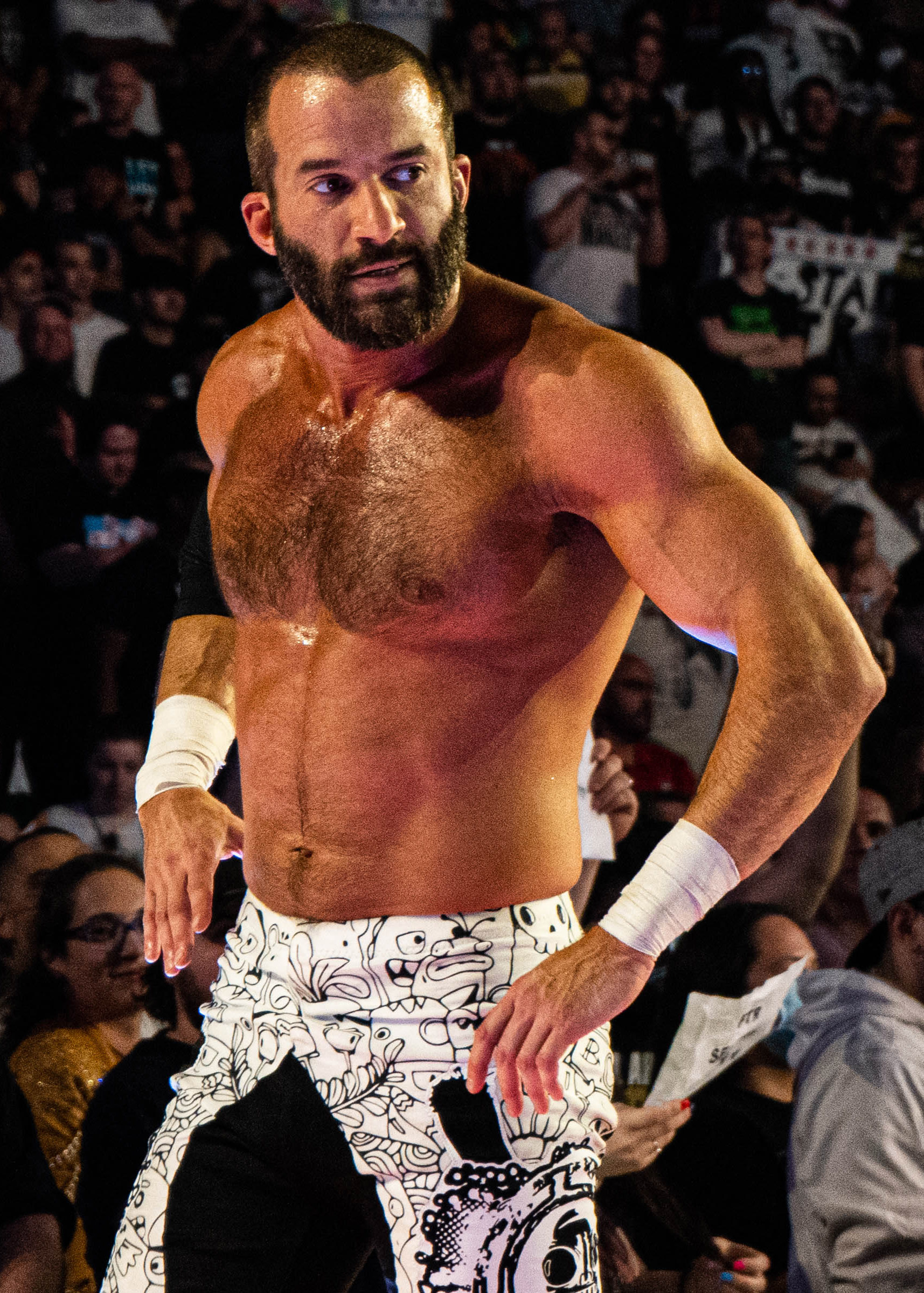
Trent Beretta

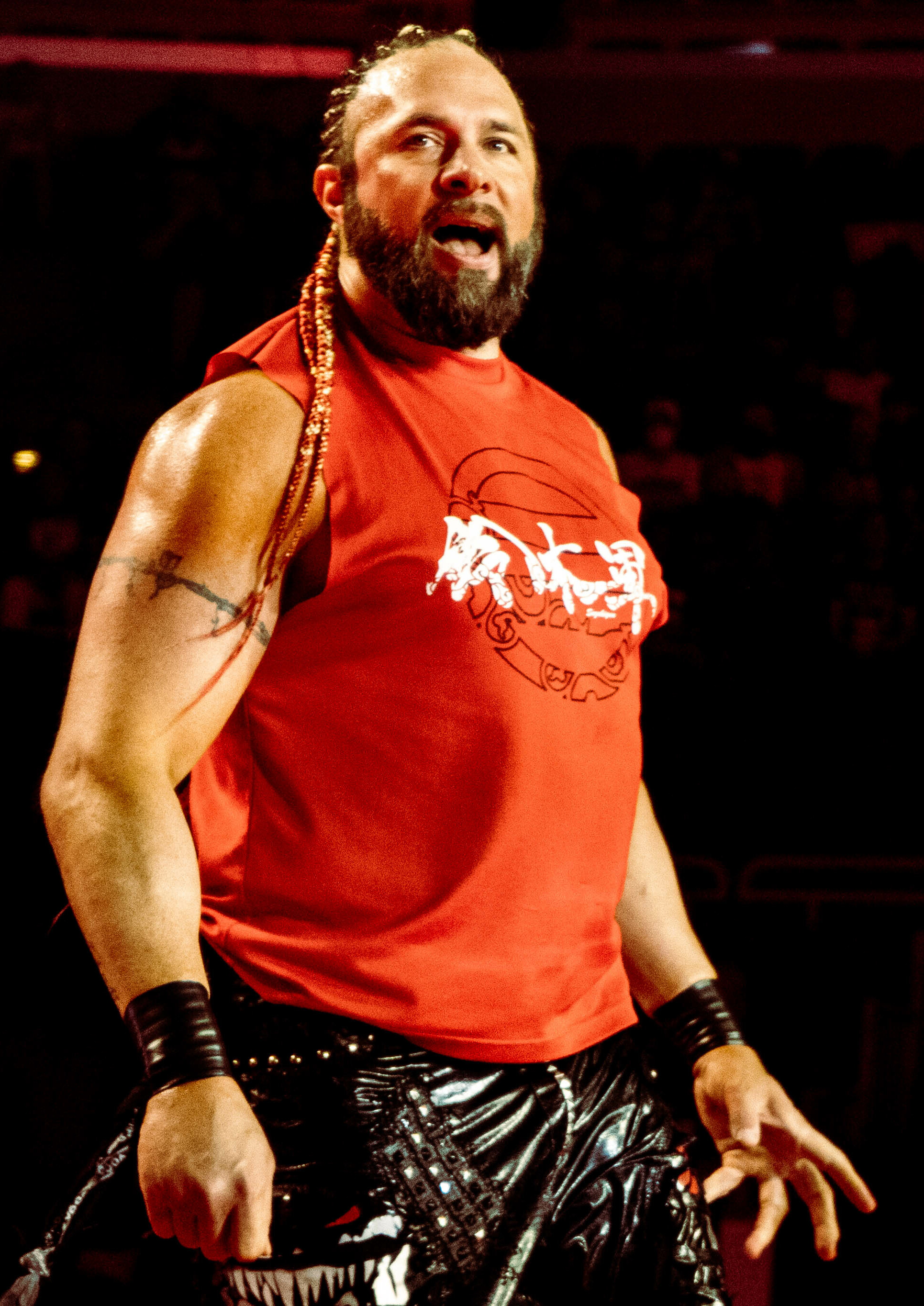
Lance Archer

Brian Cage

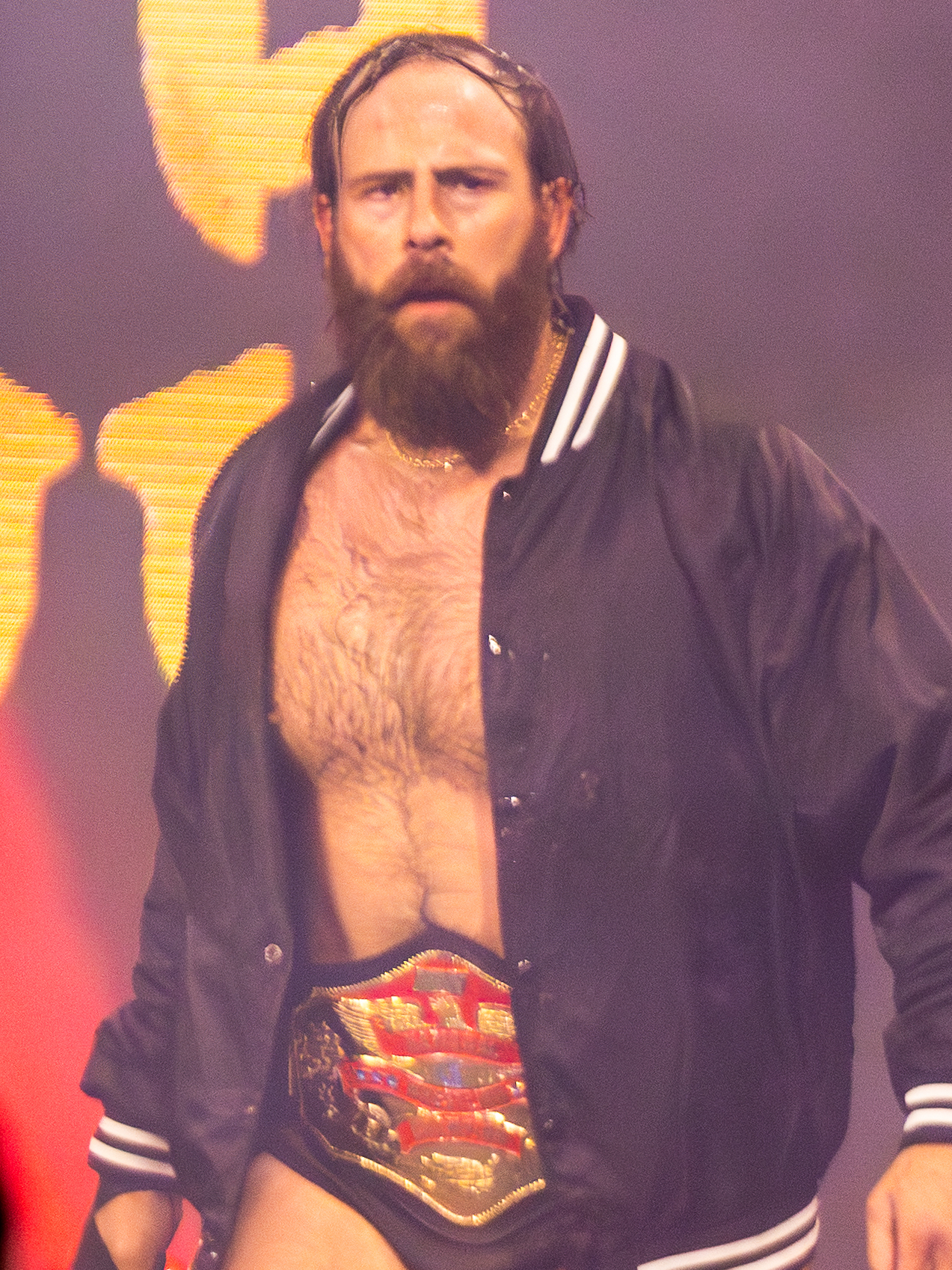
Mark Davis

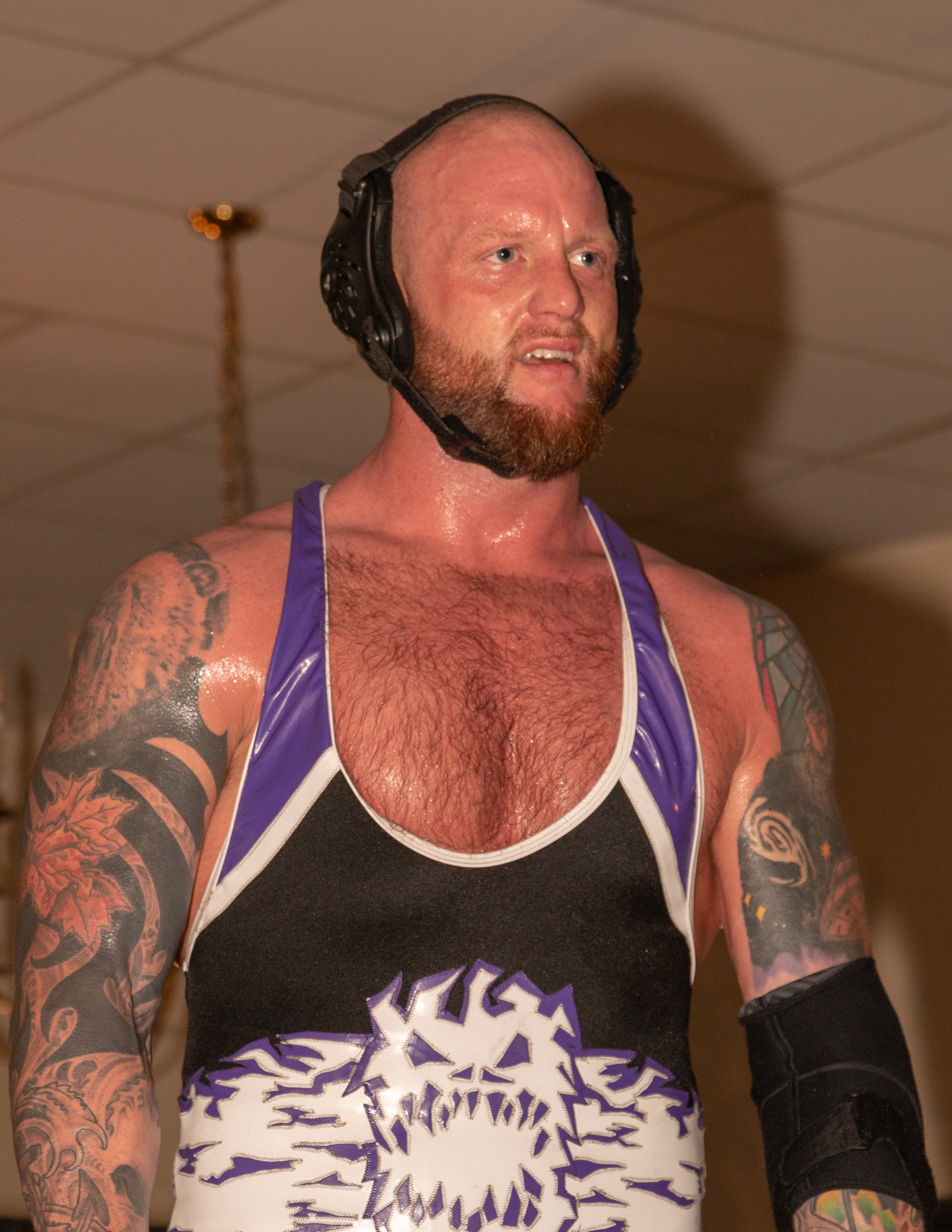
Josh Alexander

Rocky Romero

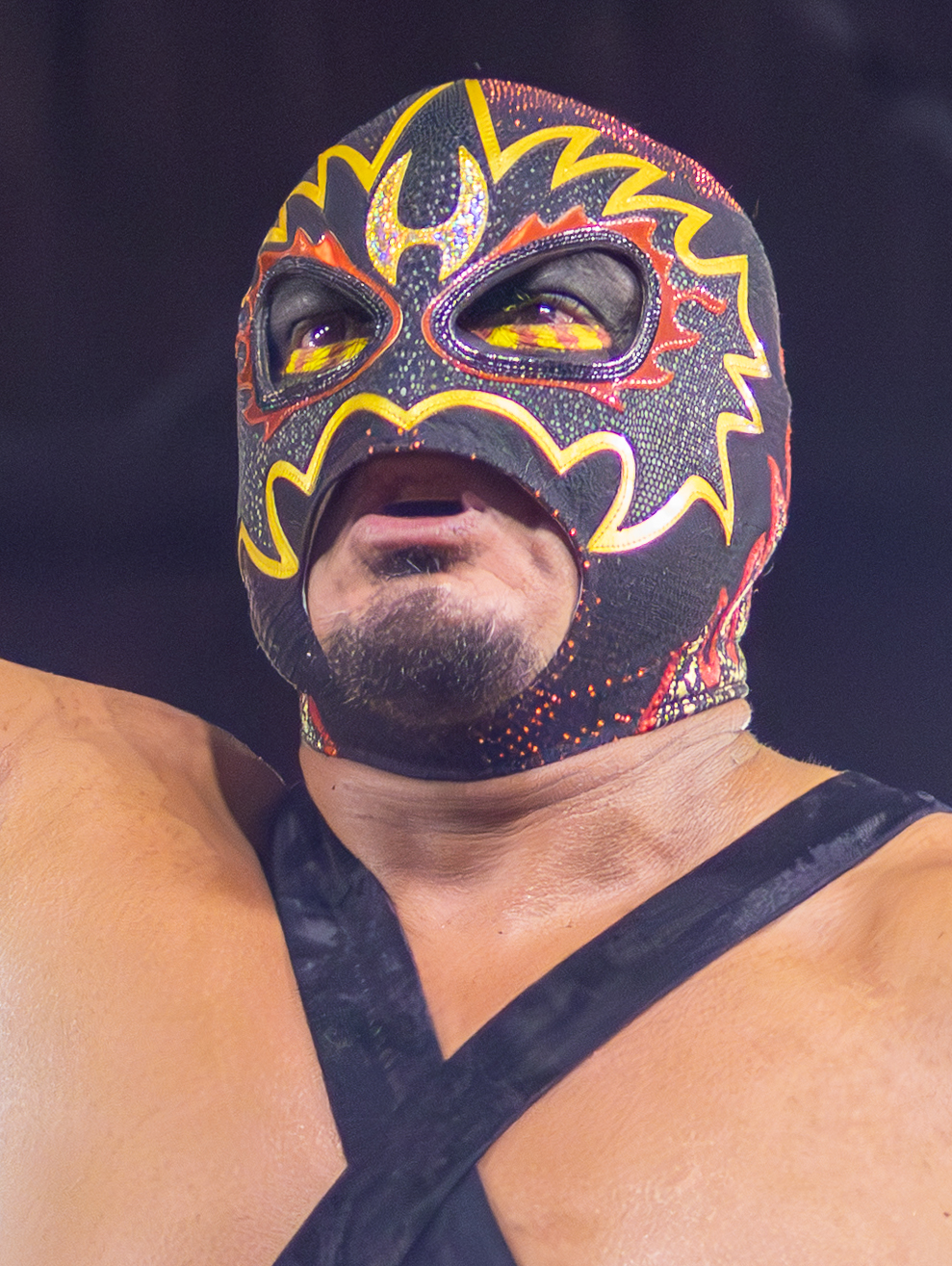
Hechicero

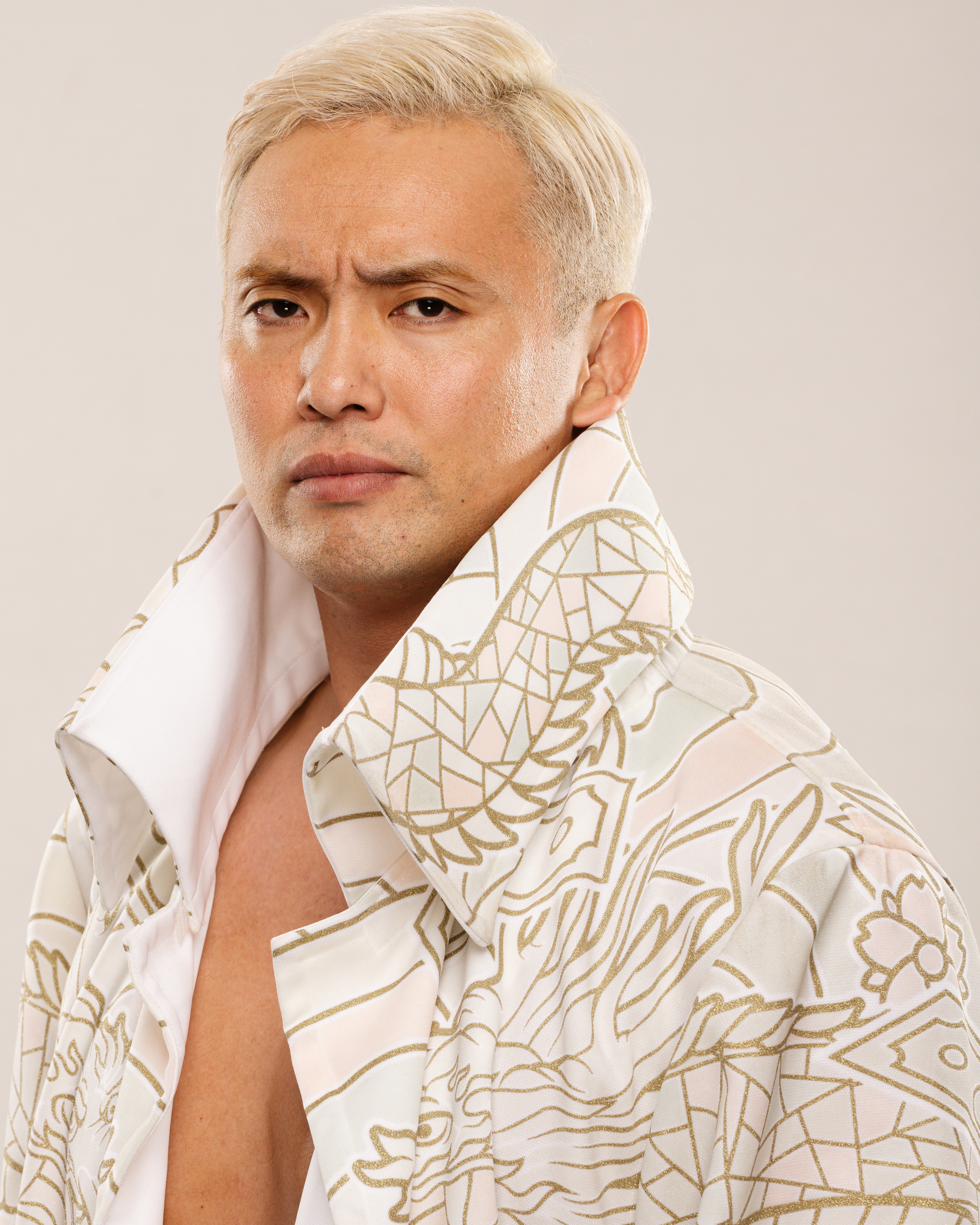
Kazuchika Okada

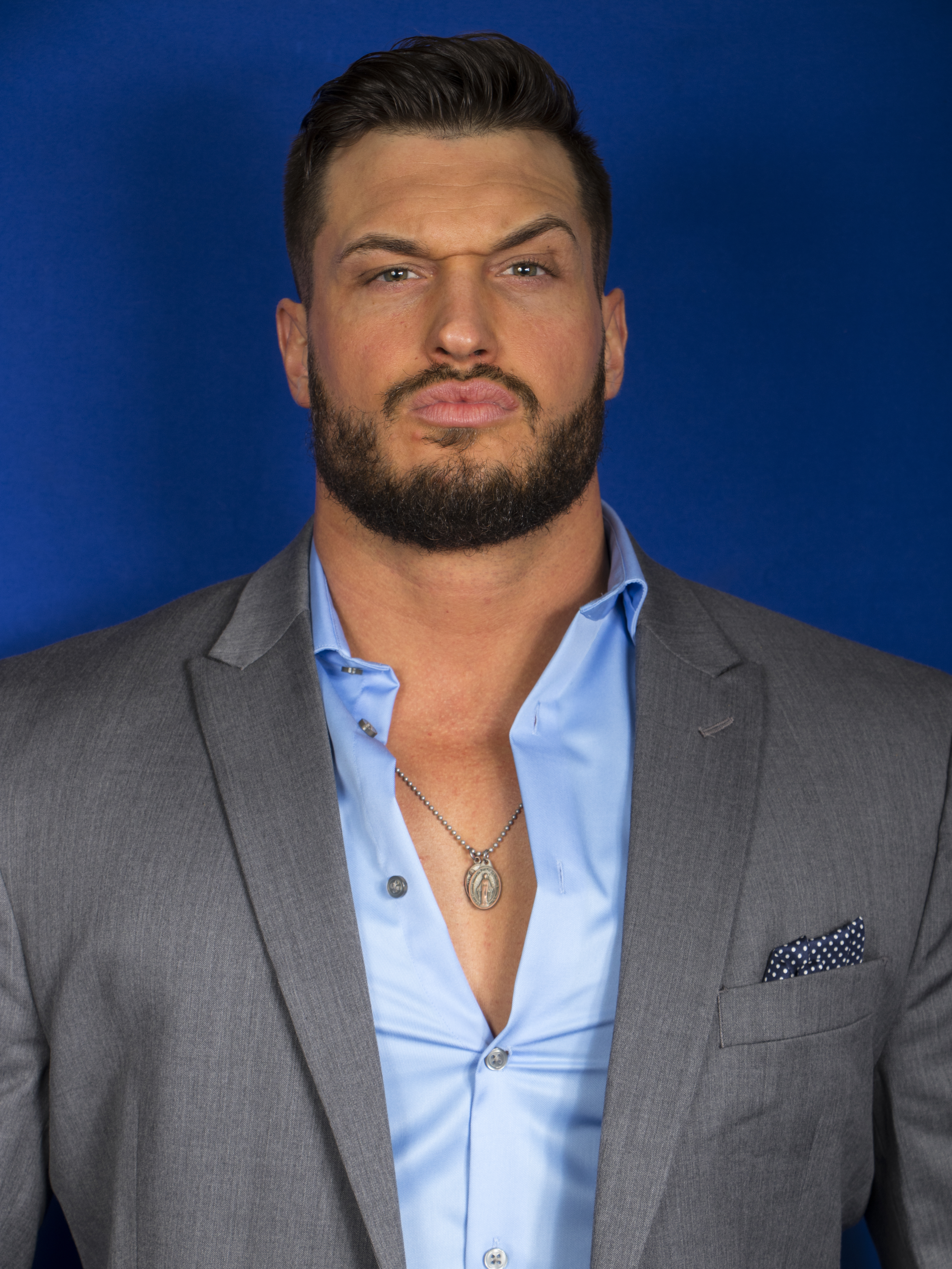
Wardlow

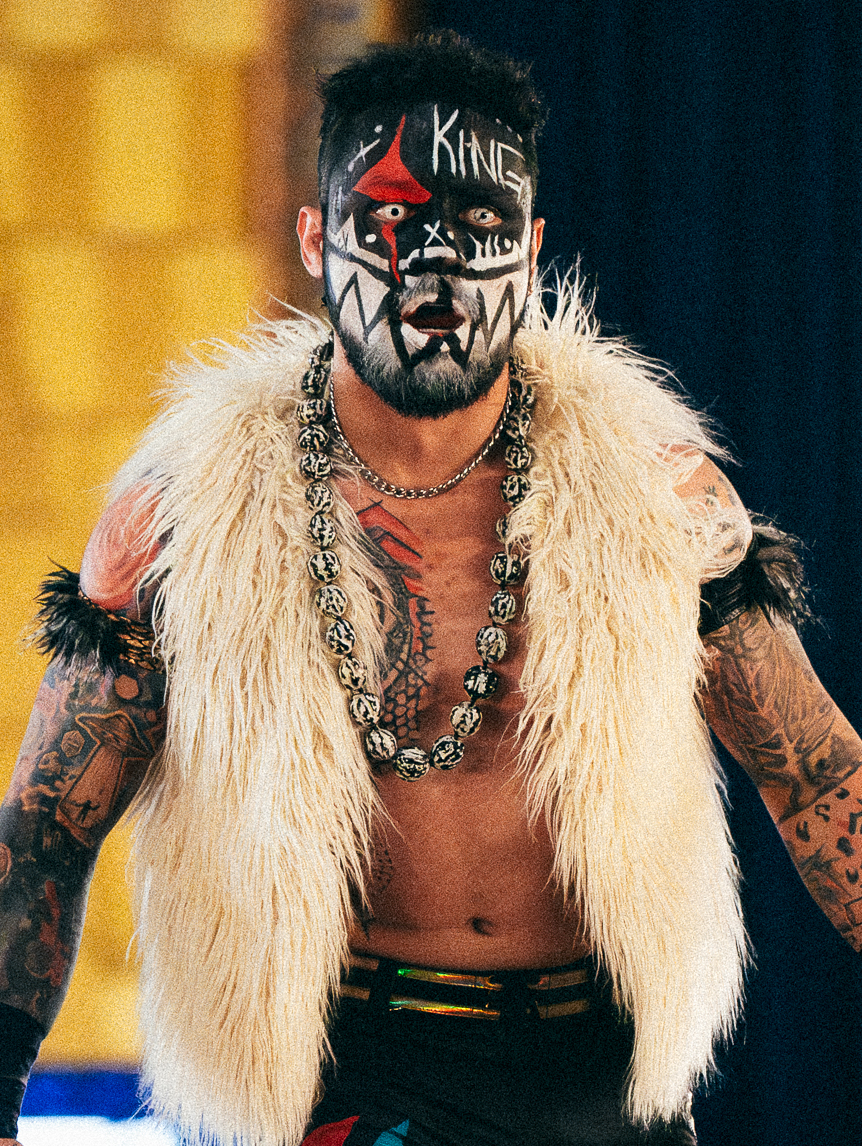
El Clon

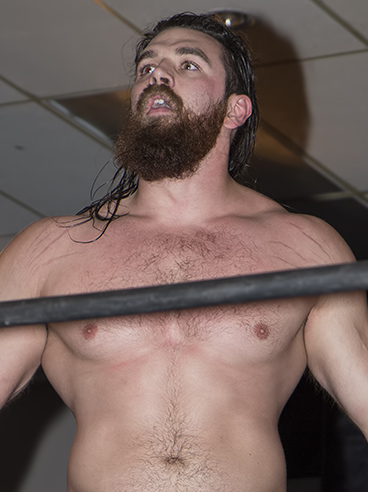
Jake Doyle

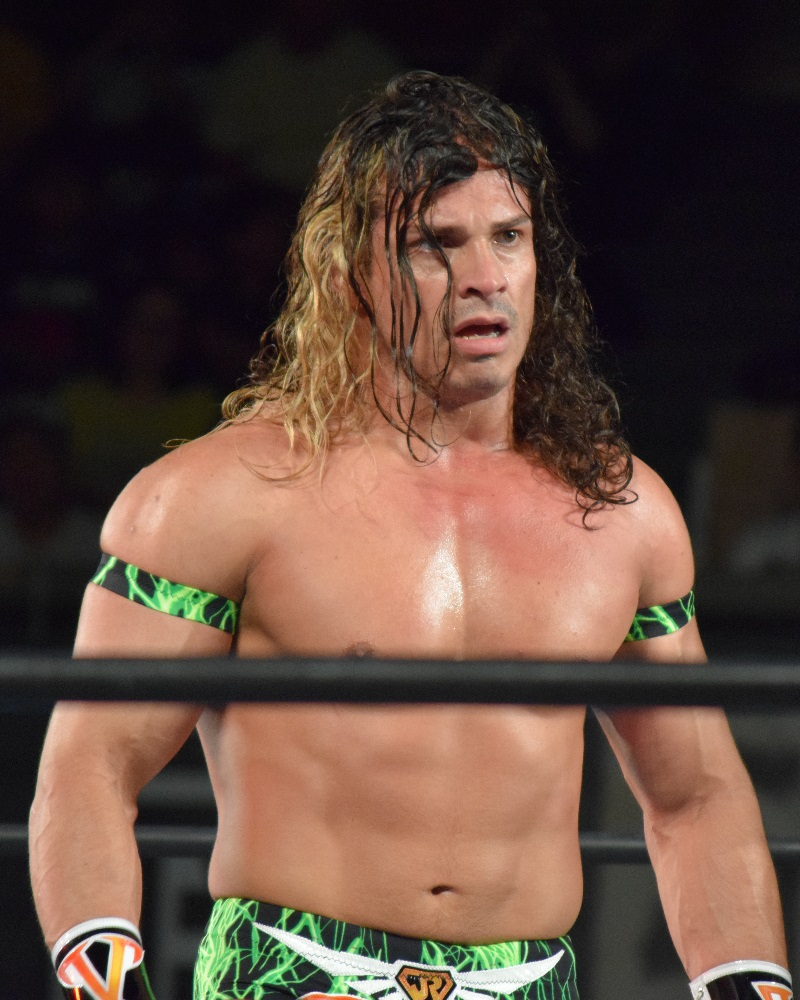
Volador Jr.

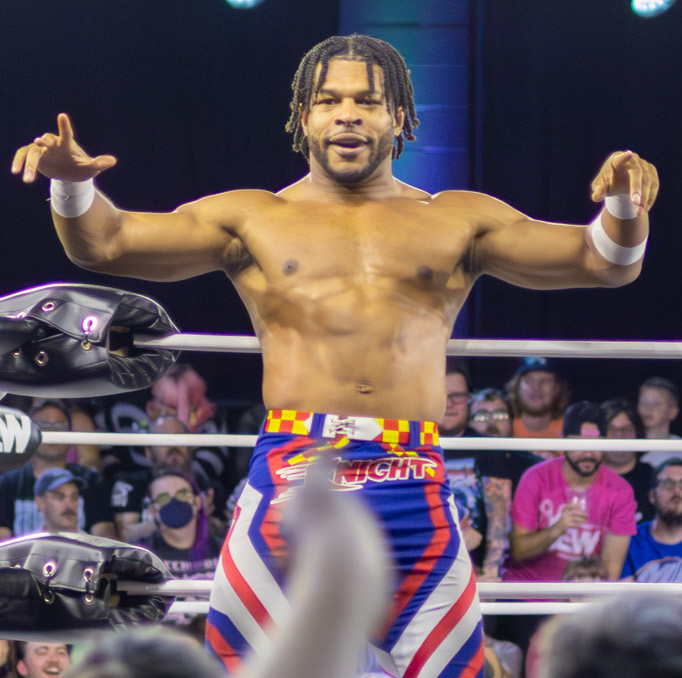
Kevin Knight

*	Founding member(s)
L/M	Leader/Manager

=== Current ===
Member		Joined
Don Callis	*L/M	May 28, 2023
Kyle Fletcher		October 28, 2023
Trent Beretta		May 29, 2024
Lance Archer		October 8, 2024
Brian Cage		October 16, 2024
Mark Davis		February 5, 2025
Josh Alexander		April 16, 2025
Rocky Romero		April 17, 2025
Hechicero		June 10, 2025
Kazuchika Okada		June 21, 2025
Wardlow		August 24, 2025
El Clon		October 1, 2025
Jake Doyle		January 7, 2026
Volador Jr.		March 30, 2026
Kevin Knight		June 3, 2026

=== Former ===
Member		Joined	Left
Sammy Guevara		September 20, 2023	December 28, 2023
Will Ospreay		June 25, 2023	July 3, 2024
Rush		July 5, 2024	October 8, 2024
Powerhouse Hobbs		October 4, 2023	November 6, 2024
Konosuke Takeshita	*	May 28, 2023	May 24, 2026
Andrade El Idolo		October 1, 2025 (Note: Andrade temporarily left the stable from November 29, 2025 till January 7, 2026)	June 28, 2026

== Timeline ==
From left to right: Brian Cage, Lance Archer and Rocky Romero making their entrance under the Don Callis Family banner at AEW Dynamite on August 19, 2026.

== Sub-groups ==
=== Current ===
Affiliate	Members	Tenure	Type
Murder Machines	Lance Archer; Brian Cage	2024-present	Tag team
RPG Vice	Trent Beretta; Rocky Romero	2025–present	Tag team

== Championships and accomplishments ==
- All Elite Wrestling
  - AEW Continental Championship (1 time) – Okada
  - AEW International Championship (6 times, current) – Ospreay (1), Takeshita (2), Okada (2, current), and Fletcher (1)
  - AEW National Championship (1 time) – Davis
  - AEW TNT Championship (3 times) – Fletcher (2) and Knight (1)
  - AEW Unified Championship (1 time, inaugural) – Okada
  - AEW World Trios Championship (1 time) – Okada, Fletcher, and Davis
- Alto Voltaje
  - Alto Voltaje Championship (1 time, current, inaugural) – Hechicero
- Consejo Mundial de Lucha Libre
  - CMLL World Heavyweight Championship (1 time) – Hechicero
  - NWA World Historic Middleweight Championship (1 time, current) – Volador Jr.
  - CMLL International Gran Prix (2026) – Hechicero
- German Wrestling Federation
  - GWF World Championship (1 time) – Andrade
- Maple Leaf Pro Wrestling
  - MLP Canadian Championship (1 time, inaugural, current) – Alexander
- New Japan Pro-Wrestling
  - IWGP Heavyweight Championship (1 time) (Note: During Takeshita's reign, the title was called the IWGP World Heavyweight Championship.) – Takeshita
  - IWGP Intercontinental Championship (1 time) (Note: With the reactivation of the IWGP Heavyweight Championship and the restored and combined histories of both it, the World Heavyweight, and the Intercontinental titles, all former IWGP World Heavyweight Champions are retroactively recognized as having been an IWGP Intercontinental Champion.) – Takeshita
  - IWGP Global Heavyweight Championship (1 time) – Andrade
  - IWGP United States Heavyweight Championship (1 time) – Ospreay
  - NEVER Openweight Championship (1 time) – Takeshita
  - NJPW World Television Championship (1 time) – Takeshita
  - G1 Climax (2025) – Takeshita
  - Ninth NJPW Triple Crown Champion – Takeshita
- Pro Wrestling Illustrated
  - Faction of the Year (2025)
- Ring of Honor
  - ROH World Television Championship (2 times) – Fletcher (1) and Cage (1)
- The Crash Lucha Libre
  - The Crash Heavyweight Championship (1 time) (Note: He was still champion after Forbidden Door but was no longer a member of the DCF.) – Andrade
- World Wrestling Council
  - WWC Universal Heavyweight Championship (1 time) – Andrade
- Wrestling Knockout Chile
  - WKC Championship (1 time) – Andrade
- Wrestling Observer Newsletter
  - Most Outstanding Wrestler (2025) – Takeshita
