= AEW Collision debut episode =

Professional wrestling television special

- Promotional poster featuring several AEW wrestlers
- Promotion: All Elite Wrestling
- Brand: AEW Collision
- Date: June 17, 2023
- City: Chicago, Illinois
- Venue: United Center
- Attendance: 10,200

Collision special episodes chronology
← Previous; First	Next → Fight for the Fallen

The AEW Collision debut episode was the pilot episode for the American television program AEW Collision, produced by the professional wrestling promotion of All Elite Wrestling. The show took place at the United Center in Chicago, Illinois and was broadcast live on TNT on June 17, 2023.

Five matches were contested as a part of the episode; in the opening bout, Luchasaurus defeated the reigning champion Wardlow for the AEW TNT Championship. Also, in the main event, CM Punk and FTR defeated Samoa Joe, Jay White and Juice Robinson in a Trios match.

== Background ==
Collision's debut episode marked the return of CM Punk to active competition in AEW after a nine-month suspension, following a legitimate fight with The Young Bucks and Kenny Omega after All Out's post media scrum, vacating the AEW World Championship he had won earlier that day against Jon Moxley.

== Storylines ==
Other on-screen personnel
Role:	Name:
Commentator	Kevin Kelly
Commentator	Jim Ross (main event)
Commentator	Nigel McGuinness
Interviewer	Lexy Nair
Ring announcer	Dasha Gonzalez
Referee	Rick Knox
Referee	Bryce Remsburg
Referee	Aubrey Edwards
Referee	Paul Turner

The event included matches that resulted from scripted storylines, where wrestlers portrayed heroes, villains, or less distinguishable characters in scripted events that built tension and culminated in a wrestling match or series of matches. Results were predetermined by AEW's writers.

== Event ==
The event took place at the United Center in Chicago, Illinois.

== Reception ==
The episode received an average viewership of 816,000 viewers, and a 0.33 rating in the 18–49 demographic. It sold an estimated 9,280 tickets.

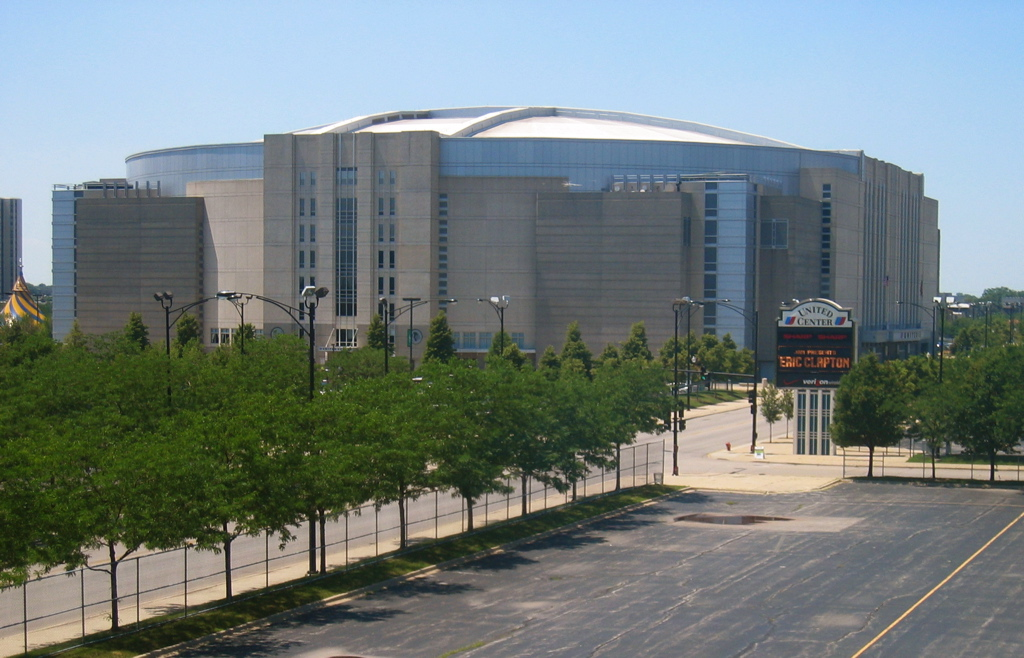
The United Center

== Results ==
No.	Results	Stipulations	Times
1	Luchasaurus (with Christian Cage) defeated Wardlow (c)	Singles match for the AEW TNT Championship	10:43
2	Andrade El Idolo defeated Buddy Matthews (with Julia Hart)	Singles match	13:03
3	Miro defeated Tony Nese (with Mark Sterling)	Singles match	3:20
4	Skye Blue and Willow Nightingale defeated The Outcasts (Toni Storm and Ruby Soho)	Tag team match	8:04
5	CM Punk and FTR (Dax Harwood and Cash Wheeler) defeated Samoa Joe, Jay White and Juice Robinson	Trios match	25:12
(c) / – the champion(s) heading into the match
