= Double or Nothing (2023) =

All Elite Wrestling pay-per-view event

- Promotional poster featuring "Jungle Boy" Jack Perry, MJF, Darby Allin, and Sammy Guevara
- Promotion: All Elite Wrestling
- Date: May 28, 2023
- City: Paradise, Nevada
- Venue: T-Mobile Arena
- Attendance: 10,550
- Buy rate: 140,000

Pay-per-view chronology
← Previous; Revolution	Next → Forbidden Door

Double or Nothing chronology
← Previous; 2022	Next → 2024

The 2023 Double or Nothing was the fifth annual Double or Nothing professional wrestling pay-per-view (PPV) event produced by All Elite Wrestling (AEW). It took place during Memorial Day weekend on May 28, 2023, at the T-Mobile Arena in the Las Vegas suburb of Paradise, Nevada for the second consecutive year.

Eleven matches were contested at the event, including one on The Buy In pre-show. In the event's final match, which was promoted as part of a double main event, Blackpool Combat Club (Bryan Danielson, Jon Moxley, Claudio Castagnoli, and Wheeler Yuta) defeated The Elite (Kenny Omega, Matt Jackson, Nick Jackson, and "Hangman" Adam Page) in an Anarchy in the Arena match. The other main event, which was the penultimate match, saw MJF defeat Sammy Guevara, Darby Allin, and "Jungle Boy" Jack Perry in a four-way match to retain the AEW World Championship. In other prominent matches, Wardlow defeated Christian Cage in a Ladder match to retain the AEW TNT Championship, and in the opening bout, Orange Cassidy won the 21-man Blackjack Battle Royal to retain the AEW International Championship. The event also saw the return of Kris Statlander, who answered Jade Cargill's open challenge and defeated her to win the AEW TBS Championship, ending Cargill's undefeated streak and record reign at 508 days. This was also Cargill's final appearance on an AEW pay-per-view event, as she did not appear on another AEW pay-per-view before her contract expired in September and she subsequently signed with WWE.

Double or Nothing was held on the same day as NXT Battleground, a premium live event produced by WWE for its developmental brand, NXT. This marked the first time since April 1989 that two major promotions produced major events head-to-head, after WWE's WrestleMania V and World Championship Wrestling (WCW)'s Clash of the Champions VI.

== Production ==
=== Background ===
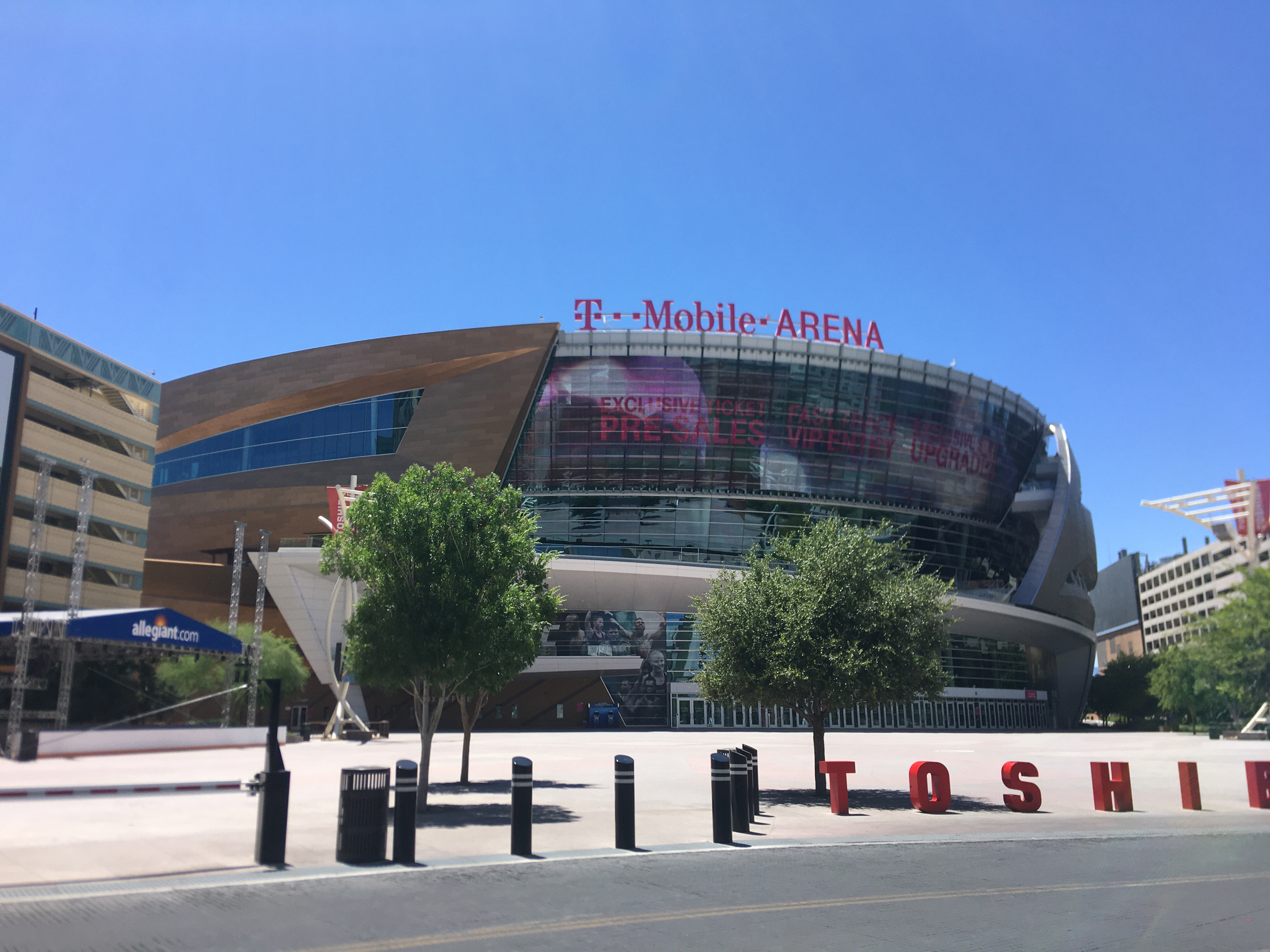
The fifth annual Double or Nothing was held at the T-Mobile Arena in the Las Vegas suburb of Paradise, Nevada for the second consecutive year.

Double or Nothing is considered All Elite Wrestling's (AEW) marquee event, having first been held in 2019, which was the promotion's first professional wrestling event and first pay-per-view (PPV) produced. It is held annually in May during Memorial Day weekend and is one of AEW's "Big Four" PPVs, which includes All Out, Full Gear, and Revolution, their four biggest domestic shows produced quarterly. The event's name is a reference to its Las Vegas theme and it is traditionally held in the Las Vegas area in Paradise, Nevada. Exceptions from this norm occurred in 2020 and 2021 due to COVID-19 pandemic restrictions that were in place at the time, but they maintained the Vegas theme.

On March 5, 2023, during the Revolution Zero Hour pre-show, it was announced that the fifth Double or Nothing event would take place on May 28 at the T-Mobile Arena, marking the second Double or Nothing held here, after the previous year's event. It was also announced that during Double or Nothing week, both Wednesday Night Dynamite and Friday Night Rampage would air live from the nearby MGM Grand Garden Arena—the location of the inaugural Double or Nothing—on May 24 and May 26, respectively. However, due to a potential TNT broadcast scheduling conflict, Rampage was rescheduled to air on tape delay as a special Saturday Night Rampage on May 27, with the event being taped immediately after the live broadcast of Dynamite, but this conflict ended up not happening, thus Rampage aired in its regular Friday time slot. Tickets for the events went on sale on March 17.

The event went head-to-head with NXT Battleground, a premium live event produced by WWE for its developmental brand, NXT. This marked the first time since 1989 that two major promotions produced major events head-to-head, after WWE's WrestleMania V (airing on PPV) and World Championship Wrestling (WCW)'s Clash of the Champions VI (airing on TBS). According to WWE executive Shawn Michaels, the scheduling was not intended for WWE to go head-to-head with AEW, but that it was just due to the holiday that weekend as he said WWE events had always done well on holidays.

=== Storylines ===
Double or Nothing featured professional wrestling matches that involved different wrestlers from pre-existing feuds and storylines. Storylines were produced on AEW's weekly television programs, Dynamite and Rampage.

On the April 19 episode of Dynamite, a Four Pillars Tournament was announced, with the winner challenging MJF for the AEW World Championship at Double or Nothing. The participants of the tournament were revealed as Sammy Guevara, "Jungle Boy" Jack Perry, and Darby Allin—these three plus MJF had long been regarded as the "four pillars" of AEW. Guevara defeated Perry by countout with assistance from MJF in the semi-final match, while Allin received a bye to the final. The following week in the final, Guevara would again win with assistance from MJF, this time defeating Darby via disqualification, however, Tony Khan stated that the singles match between MJF and Guevara at Double or Nothing would only go ahead if they could beat Perry and Darby in a tag team match; if Perry and Allin won, the World Championship match at Double or Nothing would be a four-way match between MJF, Guevara, Perry, and Allin. On the May 3 episode, Perry and Allin won.

In October 2022, "Hangman" Adam Page began a feud with Jon Moxley of the Blackpool Combat Club (BCC). This culminated in a Texas Death match at Revolution that Page won. Page thought he was done with Moxley until Moxley and Claudio Castagnoli attacked Page's friends John Silver and Alex Reynolds of The Dark Order, prompting Page to come to their aid, with BCC turning heel. BCC (Moxley, Castagnoli, Bryan Danielson, and Wheeler Yuta) then defeated Page and The Dark Order (Evil Uno and Stu Grayson). Throughout that episode, the teams fought throughout the backstage area until Page was left alone until his former friends-turned-enemies The Elite (Kenny Omega, Matt Jackson, and Nick Jackson) got involved. While The Young Bucks (Matt and Nick) wanted to mend things with Page, Omega was still hesitant until the May 17 episode of Dynamite, when Page officially rejoined The Elite with Omega's approval. The Elite then challenged BCC (Moxley, Castagnoli, Danielson, Yuta) to an Anarchy in the Arena match at Double or Nothing, which was accepted.

On the May 17 episode of Dynamite, Orange Cassidy said that anyone who wanted to challenge him for the AEW International Championship could talk to AEW president Tony Khan to try and get a match as he would defend the title against anyone. It was later revealed that several wrestlers tried talking to Khan, and it was decided that Cassidy would defend the International Championship in a 21-man Blackjack Battle Royal at Double or Nothing.

On the March 15 episode of Dynamite, Taya Valkyrie made her AEW debut and began going after Jade Cargill and her AEW TBS Championship. The two had a match for the title on the April 26 episode in which Valkyrie was banned from using her finisher; Cargill won the match. A frustrated Valkyrie put her hands on referee Aubrey Edwards and was subsequently suspended. On the May 19 episode of Rampage, Cargill held an open challenge for her title. After defeating two challengers back-to-back, Valkyrie then made her return from suspension and attacked Cargill. She subsequently challenged Cargill for the TBS Championship at Double or Nothing, which was made official.

At Full Gear in November 2022, Jamie Hayter defeated Toni Storm to become the interim AEW Women's World Champion; she subsequently became the official champion after Thunder Rosa relinquished the lineal championship due to injury. In the weeks to come, Storm turned heel and allied with Saraya and Ruby Soho, dubbing themselves the Outcasts as they were not AEW originals. After several more weeks of feuding, on the May 17 episode of Dynamite, Storm challenged Hayter to a match for the AEW Women's World Championship at Double or Nothing, which was accepted. That same episode, it was reported that Hayter was injured, but Tony Khan said that despite not being medically cleared, Hayter still wanted to do the match so the match would proceed as planned.

After winning his third AEW TNT Championship on the April 19 episode of Dynamite, Wardlow was confronted by Christian Cage and Luchasaurus. Cage subsequently made his intentions clear that he wanted the TNT Championship. After weeks of feuding, on the May 17 episode of Dynamite, Wardlow challenged Cage to a match at Double or Nothing. Cage and Luchasaurus attacked Wardlow, putting him through a ladder, and Cage accepted, with the match scheduled as a ladder match.

After a long absence due to injury, Adam Cole made his return in early 2023 with his first match scheduled for the March 29 episode of Dynamite. A week prior, he delivered a promo, questioning who his first opponent would be, only to be interrupted by the Jericho Appreciation Society's (JAS) Daniel Garcia, which led to Cole challenging Garcia to be his first opponent since his return. The following week, Cole defeated Garcia, celebrating with his partner Dr. Britt Baker, D.M.D. following the match. The celebration was interrupted by JAS leader Chris Jericho, who entered ringside and helped stablemate Garcia to the back. On the April 12 episode, Cole interrupted Jericho's celebration with Garcia after he had defeated Keith Lee, helping his former rival Lee to the back. The following week, Cole and Jericho met in the ring attempting to talk out their problems, however, this led to a brawl and a brutal assault on Cole and Baker. Cole's outnumbered feud with the JAS eventually led to the AEW debut of Roderick Strong, a former teammate of Cole's in NXT. After more feuding, an unsanctioned match between Cole and Jericho was scheduled for Double or Nothing, with Extreme Championship Wrestling (ECW) alumnus Sabu named the special guest enforcer.

== Event ==
Other on-screen personnel
Role	Name
Commentators	Excalibur (Pre-show and PPV)
Commentators	Jim Ross (Pre-show and PPV)
Commentators	Tony Schiavone (PPV)
Commentators	Taz (Pre-show and PPV)
Commentators	Don Callis (Anarchy in the Arena match)
Ring announcer	Justin Roberts
Referees	Aubrey Edwards
Referees	Bryce Remsburg
Referees	Mark Briscoe
Referees	Paul Turner
Referees	Rick Knox
Referees	Stephon Smith
Interviewer	Alex Marvez
Pre-show panel	Renee Paquette
Pre-show panel	Kazeem Famiyude
Pre-show panel	Paul Wight
Pre-show panel	Stokely Hathaway

=== Pre-show ===
There was only one match that took place on The Buy In pre-show, which saw The Hardys (Jeff Hardy and Matt Hardy) and Hook (accompanied by Isiah Kassidy) face Ethan Page and The Gunns (Austin Gunn and Colten Gunn), where if The Hardys and Hook won, Matt would gain control of Page's contract. In the closing stages, The Gunns delivered the 3:10 to Yuma to Matt, but Jeff broke up the pin with a Swanton Bomb. The Hardys then delivered stereo Twists of Fate to The Gunns and Page. Hook then locked in the Redrum on Page, forcing him to submit, thus Page became Matt's employee.

=== Preliminary matches ===
The pay-per-view opened with Orange Cassidy defending the AEW International Championship in a 21-man Blackjack Battle Royal. The end came down to Big Bill, Penta El Zero Miedo, Swerve Strickland, and Cassidy as the final four participants. Bill delivered a lariat to Penta, thus eliminating him. As Bill attempted a chokeslam on Cassidy, Strickland snuck up from behind and eliminated Bill. Cassidy performed a Stundog Millionaire, followed by a pump kick by Strickland. Cassidy then hit the Orange Punch, but Strickland held onto the ropes. Cassidy kicked Strickland's hands off the ropes, thus eliminating him and retaining the title.

The next match was an unsanctioned match between Adam Cole (accompanied by Roderick Strong) and Chris Jericho (accompanied by Jake Hager, Daniel Garcia, Matt Menard, and Angelo Parker), with Sabu serving as the special guest enforcer. In the opening stages, Cole delivered a Panama Sunrise on the apron to Jericho. Jericho then pushed Cole into the steel steps. As Jericho attempted a Lionsault, Cole countered into a mid-air superkick. As Cole attempted another Panama Sunrise, Jericho countered into the Walls of Jericho, but Cole reached the ropes. Jericho then delivered the Codebreaker and brought out a kendo stick. Dr. Britt Baker, D.M.D. then came out and started beating Jericho with a kendo stick. Saraya then came out and fought Baker to the back. Cole then performed a DDT to Jericho for a two count. Cole then delivered a superkick, a Panama Sunrise, and two Last Shots (with one with a chain wrapped around his knee). Cole then started punching Jericho with the chain wrapped around his hand, forcing referee Aubrey Edwards to stop the match, declaring Cole the winner via referee stoppage.

After that, FTR (Dax Harwood and Cash Wheeler) defended the AEW World Tag Team Championship against Jay Lethal and Jeff Jarrett (accompanied by Sonjay Dutt, Karen Jarrett, and Satnam Singh), with Mark Briscoe serving as the special guest referee. In the closing stages, as Jeff attempted to smash Harwood with a guitar, Harwood ducked and Jarrett instead hit Briscoe. FTR then delivered the Big Rig, but as Aubrey Edwards was coming down to count the pin, Karen smashed a guitar over her head. Lethal then delivered simultaneous Lethal Injections to FTR for a two count. FTR then delivered the Big Rig to Jeff for the win.

In the fourth match, Wardlow defended the AEW TNT Championship against Christian Cage in a Ladder match. In the closing stages, Cage delivered an inverted DDT off the ladder. Wardlow then performed an Alabama Slam to Cage. Wardlow then delivered a chair shot and a Senton Atomico from the top of a ladder through a table to Luchasaurus. Wardlow then performed a Powerbomb to Cage and climbed the ladder to retain the title.

Next, Jamie Hayter defended the AEW Women's World Championship against Toni Storm. Before the match started, Saraya and Ruby Soho attacked Hayter. Hayter delivered the Hayterade for a two count. Storm then performed the Storm Zero to become the first two-time AEW Women's World Champion.

After that, The House of Black (Malakai Black, Buddy Matthews, and Brody King, accompanied by Julia Hart) defended the AEW World Trios Championship against The Acclaimed (Anthony Bowens and Max Caster) and Billy Gunn. In the closing stages, Matthews delivered a Meteora to Bowens. King then performed a cannonball in the corner, but Caster broke up the pin. Gunn then delivered the Famouser, but Black immediately performed a Black Mass to Gunn for the win.

The next match was for the AEW TBS Championship contested between defending champion Jade Cargill (with Leila Grey and "Smart" Mark Sterling) and Taya Valkyrie. In the end, Valkyrie delivered a lariat, a Blue Thunder Bomb, and the Road to Valhalla for a two count. Cargill then performed a spear and the Jaded for the win. Immediately after, Cargill called out any woman to face her. This brought out the returning Kris Statlander, who had been out with an injury for the last several months. As Cargill attempted the Jaded, Statlander blocked it and performed the Big Bang to become the new champion, ending Cargill's reign at 508 days and making Cargill's record to 60–1.

In the penultimate match and the first of the double main event, MJF defended the AEW World Championship against "Jungle Boy" Jack Perry, Sammy Guevara, and Darby Allin. In the opening stages, Perry delivered a rebound lariat, but Allin followed it up with a poisonrana. Allin then performed Diamond Dust to MJF for a two count. Guevara then hit a superkick and a Spanish Fly for a two count. MJF delivered a powerbomb backbreaker for another two count. Allin then performed a Scorpion Death Drop, Guevara delivered a Codebreaker, and Perry hit a Killswitch, all to MJF. Guevara and Allin then simultaneously performed the Walls of Jericho and the Scorpion Death Lock on MJF and Perry, respectively. Guevara then delivered the Ace Crusher and Allin performed the Yoshi Tonic on MJF for a two count. MJF then delivered an avalanche powerbomb to Darby for a two count. Allin then hit the Last Supper to Perry for a two count. Guevara then delivered the GTH to Perry. As Guevara attempted the 450° splash, Allin pushed him off the ropes. As Allin attempted the Coffin Drop to Perry, MJF put the title belt over Perry's body, causing Allin to fall onto the belt. MJF then delivered a headlock takeover to Allin to retain the title.

=== Main event ===
The main event and the final match was the Anarchy in the Arena match, contested between the Blackpool Combat Club (Bryan Danielson, Jon Moxley, Claudio Castagnoli, and Wheeler Yuta) and The Elite (Kenny Omega, Matt Jackson, Nick Jackson, and "Hangman" Adam Page). In the opening stages, the Blackpool Combat Club's entrance theme (the X cover of "Wild Thing") was performed live by the band Violent Idols, who kept repeating the song long after the match started in keeping with the general theme of the match. Danielson delivered a roundhouse kick to Page, who responded with a lariat. The Elite then performed simultaneous superkicks to the Blackpool Combat Club, after which Matt delivered locomotion northern lights suplexes to Yuta. Matt and Nick then stopped the band from playing by hitting a double superkick on its lead singer. Nick then hit a tope con giro on Castagnoli while Moxley suplexed Omega into barbed wire and stabbed a fork into Omega's forehead, followed by the action spilling out even further into the arena. Castagnoli hit a piledriver on Matt in the back of a pickup truck outside the arena, and Page hit the Dead Eye on Moxley. Page then hit Yuta with the Buckshot Lariat for a two count, followed by Danielson performing Busaiku Knees on Omega and Page. Yuta then hit a low blow on Matt and Moxley then delivered a Gotch-style piledriver to Nick. Moxley put a handful of thumb tacks in Matt's mouth while Castagnoli hit Nick with an uppercut. Omega delivered a V-Trigger to Castagnoli, then hit the One-Winged Angel on Danielson, but Yuta broke up the pin. As Page attempted the Buckshot Lariat again, Yuta ducked and jabbed Page in the face with a screwdriver. Omega set Yuta up for another One-Winged Angel, but Omega's former manager Don Callis appeared with Konosuke Takeshita, who had aligned himself with The Elite in recent weeks. Takeshita betrayed The Elite just as Callis had betrayed Omega a few weeks earlier, delivering a jumping knee strike to Omega and turning heel for the first time in his career. Yuta then rolled Omega up into a seatbelt pin to win the match.

== Reception ==
Journalist Dave Meltzer of the Wrestling Observer Newsletter gave star ratings to each match of the night. He rated the AEW Women's World Championship match 1.25 stars, which was the lowest rated match of the night. He then gave the kick-off show match 1.75 stars, and the Blackjack Battle Royale 4.25 stars. Adam Cole vs Chris Jericho received 3.25 stars, which also carried over to the AEW Trios Championship match, which also received 3.25 stars. The AEW World Tag Team Championship match received 4 stars, while the TNT Championship Ladder Match received 3.75 stars. Jade Cargill vs Taya Valkyrie received 2.75 stars, while the AEW World Championship match received 4.75 stars. Finally, the Anarchy in the Arena match received 5 stars, which made it the highest rated match of the night. The PPV received 140,000 buys, down from the previous year, which drew 155,000 buys.

=== Blackface controversy ===
The Anarchy in the Arena match generated controversy due to the appearance of the Violent Idols lead singer's mask, which several people commented resembled blackface. PWInsider stated that multiple people in AEW "couldn't believe it was allowed", while Jim Cornette wondered "how did this escape anybody's attention, that there's a fucking white guy out there in blackface just wandering about like this is normal[?]". Many social media users also criticized it.

== Results ==
No.	Results	Stipulations	Times
1^{P}	The Hardys (Jeff Hardy and Matt Hardy) and Hook (with Isiah Kassidy) defeated Ethan Page and The Gunns (Austin Gunn and Colten Gunn) by submission	Trios match Since the Hardys and Hook won, Matt Hardy took ownership of Ethan Page's contract.	15:45
2	Orange Cassidy (c) won by last eliminating Swerve Strickland (Note: Order of elimination: Tony Nese, Ari Daivari, Komander, Kip Sabian, Chuck Taylor, The Blade, The Butcher, Bandido, Lee Moriarty, Trent Beretta, Keith Lee, Rey Fénix, Juice Robinson, Jay White, Ricky Starks, Brian Cage, Dustin Rhodes, Penta El Zero Miedo, and Big Bill)	21-man Blackjack Battle Royal for the AEW International Championship	22:30
3	Adam Cole (with Roderick Strong) defeated Chris Jericho (with Angelo Parker, Matt Menard, Daniel Garcia, and Jake Hager) by referee stoppage	Unsanctioned match Sabu was the special guest enforcer.	19:00
4	FTR (Dax Harwood and Cash Wheeler) (c) defeated Jeff Jarrett and Jay Lethal (with Karen Jarrett, Sonjay Dutt, and Satnam Singh) by pinfall	Tag team match for the AEW World Tag Team Championship; Mark Briscoe was the special guest referee.	19:55
5	Wardlow (c) defeated Christian Cage	Ladder match for the AEW TNT Championship	17:10
6	Toni Storm (with Saraya and Ruby Soho) defeated Jamie Hayter (c) by pinfall	Singles match for the AEW Women's World Championship	3:05
7	The House of Black (Malakai Black, Brody King, and Buddy Matthews) (c) (with Julia Hart) defeated The Acclaimed (Anthony Bowens and Max Caster) and Billy Gunn by pinfall	"House Rules" trios match for the AEW World Trios Championship; Gunn and Acclaimed did not specify their stipulation.	15:20
8	Jade Cargill (c) (with "Smart" Mark Sterling and Leila Grey) defeated Taya Valkyrie by pinfall	Singles match for the AEW TBS Championship	8:45
9	Kris Statlander defeated Jade Cargill (c) (with "Smart" Mark Sterling and Leila Grey) by pinfall	Singles match for the AEW TBS Championship	0:50
10	MJF (c) defeated Sammy Guevara, Darby Allin, and "Jungle Boy" Jack Perry by pinfall	Four-way match for the AEW World Championship	27:50
11	Blackpool Combat Club (Bryan Danielson, Jon Moxley, Claudio Castagnoli, and Wheeler Yuta) defeated The Elite (Kenny Omega, Matt Jackson, Nick Jackson, and "Hangman" Adam Page) by pinfall	Anarchy in the Arena match	27:00
(c) / – the champion(s) heading into the match; P / – the match was broadcast on the pre-show

=== Four Pillars Tournament ===
First Round; Dynamite (April 19)
Sammy Guevara	Countout
"Jungle Boy" Jack Perry	11:30
Darby Allin
BYE

Finals; Dynamite (April 26)
Sammy Guevara	DQ
Darby Allin	11:55

- Note – Due to winning the Four Pillars Tournament, Guevara was scheduled to face MJF for the AEW World Championship at Double or Nothing; however, the championship match was later turned into a four-way match also involving Allin and Perry.
