= Double or Nothing (2022) =

All Elite Wrestling pay-per-view event

- Promotional poster featuring "Hangman" Adam Page and CM Punk
- Promotion: All Elite Wrestling
- Date: May 29, 2022
- City: Paradise, Nevada
- Venue: T-Mobile Arena
- Attendance: 14,459
- Buy rate: 165,000

Pay-per-view chronology
← Previous; Revolution	Next → Forbidden Door

Double or Nothing chronology
← Previous; 2021	Next → 2023

The 2022 Double or Nothing was a professional wrestling pay-per-view (PPV) event produced by All Elite Wrestling (AEW). It was the fourth annual Double or Nothing and took place during Memorial Day weekend on May 29, 2022, at the T-Mobile Arena in the Las Vegas suburb of Paradise, Nevada. The event returned Double or Nothing to its home of Las Vegas, after the previous two years had to be held at Daily's Place and the adjacent TIAA Bank Field stadium in Jacksonville, Florida due to the COVID-19 pandemic.

Thirteen matches were contested at the event, including one on The Buy In pre-show. In the main event, CM Punk defeated "Hangman" Adam Page to win the AEW World Championship, which was Punk's first world championship win since 2011. In other prominent matches, Adam Cole and Dr. Britt Baker, D.M.D. were the inaugural winners of the men's and women's Owen Hart Cup, The Jericho Appreciation Society (Chris Jericho, Daniel Garcia, Jake Hager, Angelo Parker, and Matt Menard) defeated The Blackpool Combat Club (Bryan Danielson and Jon Moxley), Eddie Kingston, Santana, and Ortiz by technical submission in an Anarchy in the Arena match, and in the opening bout, Wardlow defeated MJF, which freed Wardlow from his "contract" with MJF and officially "signed" with AEW.

The event saw the AEW debuts of Stokely Hathaway (who aligned himself with Jade Cargill), Athena (previously known as Ember Moon in WWE), and Rush (who aligned himself with Andrade El Ídolo and became a member of the Andrade Family Office). It additionally featured a special appearance from Owen Hart's widow Dr. Martha Hart, the in-ring debut of mixed martial artist Paige VanZant, and the first-ever Anarchy in the Arena match, which replaced Stadium Stampede featured at the prior two events.

== Production ==
=== Background ===
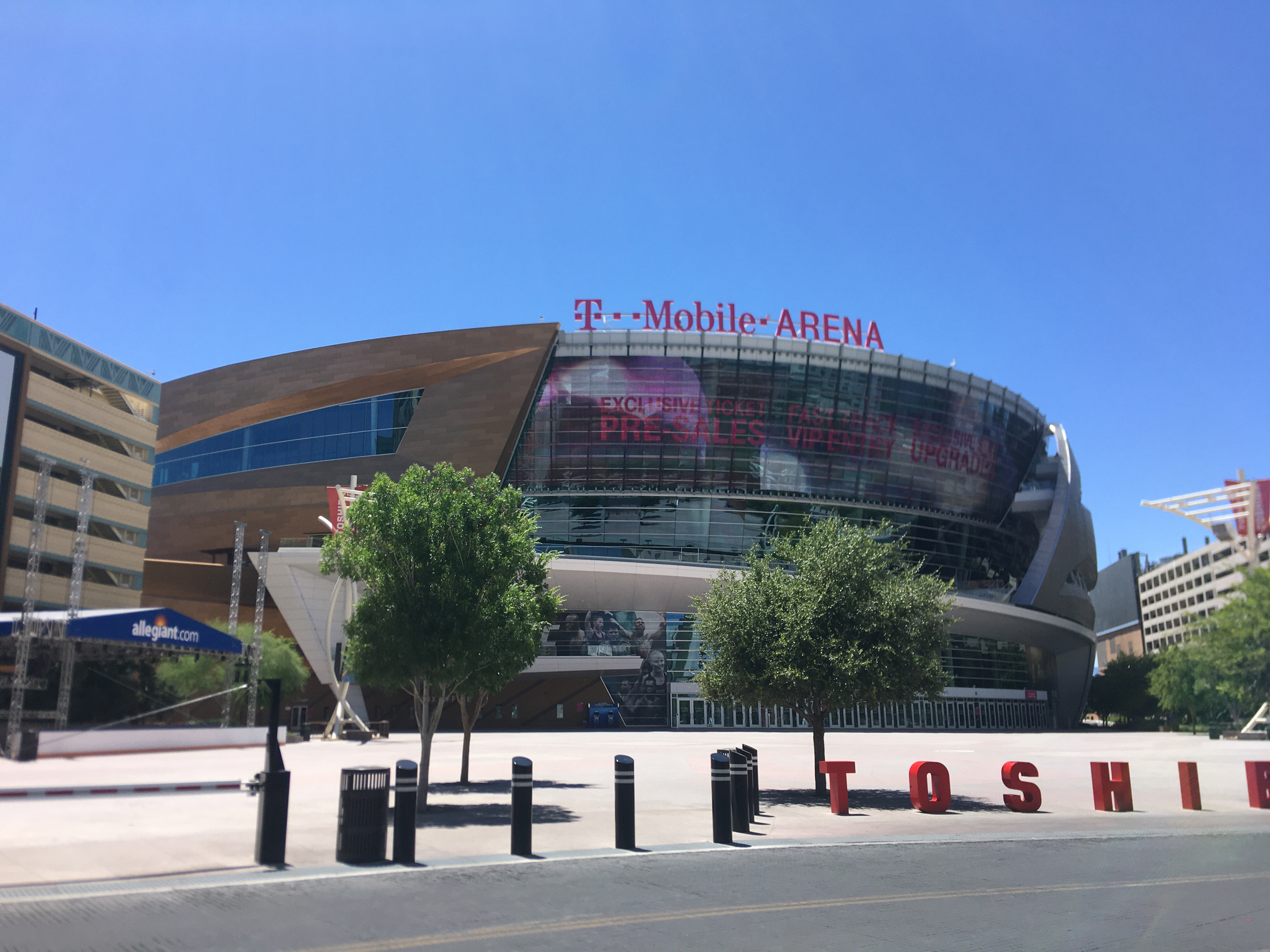
The 2022 event returned Double or Nothing to Las Vegas, with the event held at the T-Mobile Arena on the Las Vegas Strip in Paradise, Nevada.

Double or Nothing is considered All Elite Wrestling's (AEW) marquee event, having first been held in 2019, which was the promotion's first professional wrestling event and first pay-per-view (PPV) produced. It is held annually in May during Memorial Day weekend and is one of AEW's "Big Four" PPVs, which includes All Out, Full Gear, and Revolution, their four biggest domestic shows produced quarterly. The event's name is a reference to its Las Vegas theme, which was where the inaugural event was held. After the previous two years' events had to be held at Daily's Place and the adjacent TIAA Bank Field stadium in Jacksonville, Florida due to the COVID-19 pandemic, the 2022 event returned Double or Nothing to Las Vegas.

On February 23, 2022, it was confirmed that the fourth Double or Nothing event would take place on May 29, but unlike the inaugural event, which was held at the MGM Grand Garden Arena, the 2022 event was held at the T-Mobile Arena on the Las Vegas Strip in Paradise, Nevada. Additionally as part of Double or Nothing week, both of AEW's weekly television programs, Wednesday Night Dynamite and Friday Night Rampage, aired live on May 25 and May 27, respectively, at the nearby Michelob Ultra Arena at the Mandalay Bay. There was also a fan fest on Saturday, May 28, held at the Mandalay Bay Convention Center.

Tickets for Double or Nothing went on sale on March 4, 2022, in which first day sales drew over $1 million at the gate, marking the first time AEW crossed $1 million at the gate. In addition to PPV, AEW partnered with Joe Hand Promotions to air Double or Nothing in select movie theaters across the United States.

=== Storylines ===
Double or Nothing featured professional wrestling matches that involved different wrestlers from pre-existing feuds and storylines. Storylines were produced on AEW's weekly television programs, Dynamite and Rampage, the supplementary online streaming shows, Dark and Elevation, and The Young Bucks' YouTube series Being The Elite.

In September 2021, AEW announced the establishment of the Owen Hart Cup, an annual tournament to honor the legacy of Owen Hart, a prominent wrestler for WWE (at the time was known as the World Wrestling Federation) during the 1990s, who died at that company's 1999 Over the Edge PPV. The tournament was established in collaboration with The Owen Hart Foundation. On December 17, AEW revealed that there would be both a men's and women's tournament of the Owen Hart Cup, and the winners would receive a trophy called "The Owen". It was also confirmed that the tournaments would begin in May with the finals to be held at Double or Nothing. AEW President and Chief Executive Officer Tony Khan revealed that he had originally considered concluding the Owen Hart Cup at the Revolution, but decided on Double or Nothing so that Dr. Martha Hart could be involved due to her schedule. In deciding why there would be both a men's and women's tournament, Khan likened it to the Wimbledon tennis tournament, which also has both men's and women's tournaments.

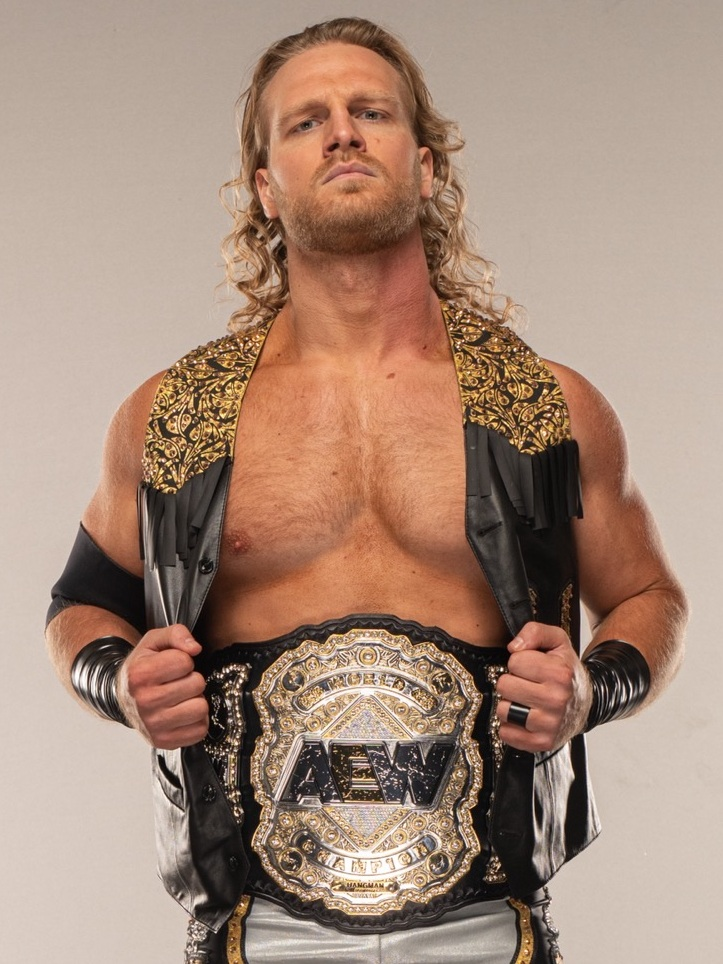
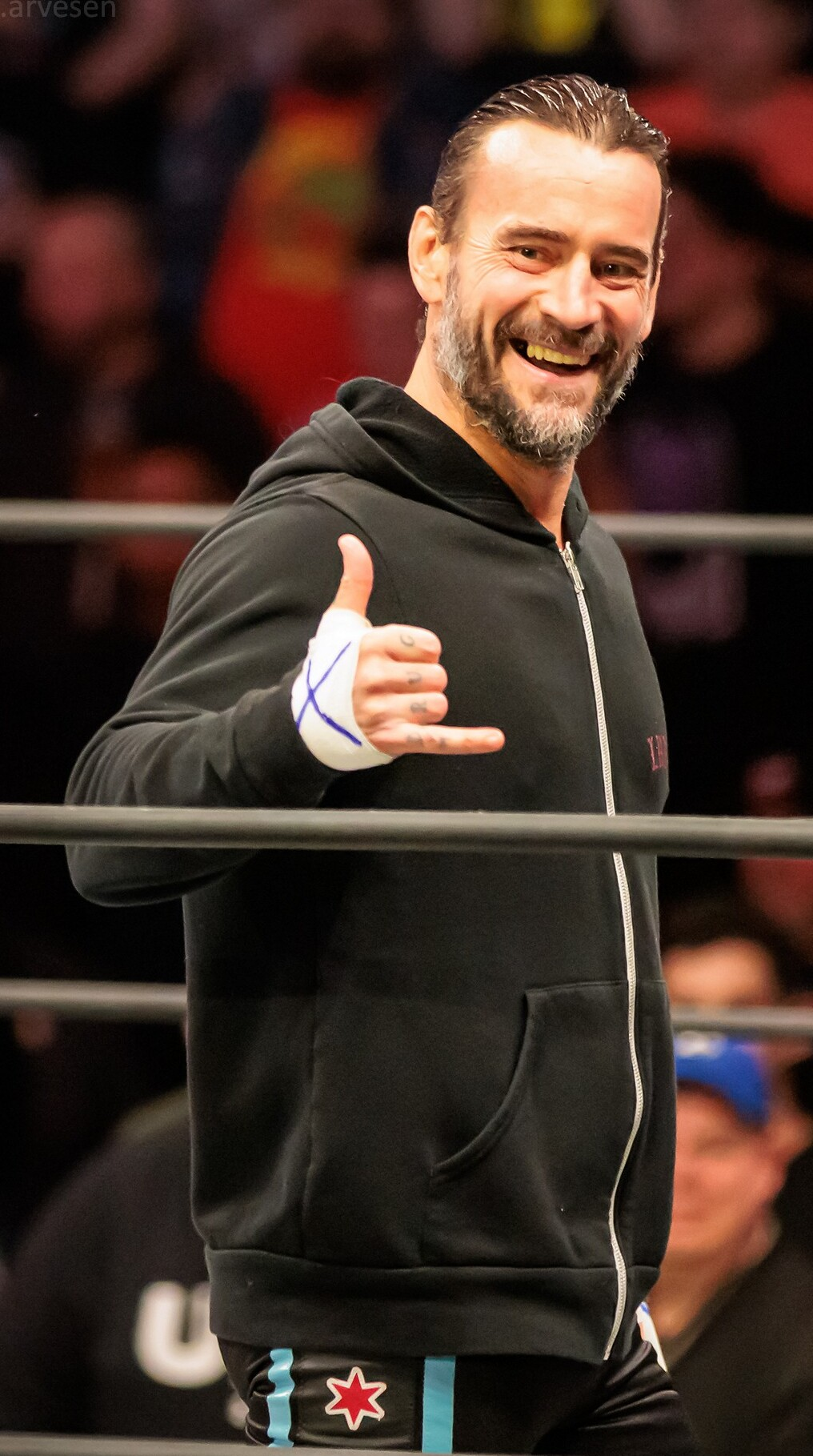
The predominant rivalry heading into Double or Nothing was between reigning champion "Hangman" Adam Page (left) and CM Punk (right) over the AEW World Championship.

In the wake of CM Punk's victory at Revolution, he set his sights on the AEW World Championship. Over the following weeks, Punk would defeat the likes of Dax Harwood, Max Caster, and Penta Oscuro. After conquering Dustin Rhodes on the April 20 episode of Dynamite, reigning champion "Hangman" Adam Page confronted Punk as the latter had ascended the top of the rankings to become the number one contender for Page's championship. The following week, the match was subsequently scheduled for Double or Nothing.

During MJF's match at Revolution, Wardlow, who began developing tension with MJF in December 2021, turned on the latter, thus turning face. On the following episode of Dynamite, Wardlow cemented his turn in a promo, declaring that he was no longer MJF's bodyguard and no longer a member of the Pinnacle. On the May 18 episode of Dynamite, Wardlow, as part of a set of contract stipulations which would make him able to wrestle MJF, was lashed 10 times by MJF, only to be also ambushed by Shawn Spears. The succeeding week, Wardlow completed the final stipulation which guaranteed him a match with MJF at Double or Nothing by defeating Spears in a steel cage match, with MJF serving unsuccessfully as the special guest referee; should Wardlow win, he would be officially released from his contract with MJF, but would be banned from obtaining a new AEW contract and be required to remain under MJF's employment if he loses.

Following the match between Eddie Kingston and Chris Jericho at Revolution, where Kingston emerged victorious, Kingston attempted to shake the hand of Jericho, who stated before the match he would do so if Kingston defeated him, but Jericho instead refused and left the ring. On the following episode of Dynamite, Jericho turned heel by attacking Kingston and Santana & Ortiz with the help of 2.0, Daniel Garcia, and Jake Hager, ending The Inner Circle, and forming a new stable named "The Jericho Appreciation Society". The following week, Jericho stated that the fans and the Inner Circle did not appreciate him, and that Kingston embarrassed him by making him tap out. He then dubbed the stable as "sport-entertainers" who beats up "pro-wrestlers". On the May 11 episode of Dynamite, Kingston along with Santana and Ortiz, united with the Blackpool Combat Club to fight off the Jericho Appreciation Society. The following week, Kingston agreed to team with Jon Moxley and Bryan Danielson, along with Santana and Ortiz, to wrestle the Jericho Appreciation Society in an Anarchy in the Arena match at Double or Nothing.

After remaining undefeated for a year, Scorpio Sky defeated Sammy Guevara to win the AEW TNT Championship on the March 9 episode of Dynamite. After the match, Paige VanZant, who helped Sky win the title, signed her AEW contract on top of Guevara's real-life girlfriend, Tay Conti. Although Sky lost the title back to Guevara at Battle of the Belts II, he regained it two weeks later on the April 27 episode of Dynamite after defeating Guevara in a ladder match. On the May 13 episode of Rampage, Sky successfully defended the title against his former tag team partner Frankie Kazarian, following interference from Ethan Page and Dan Lambert. On the May 27 episode of Rampage, it was announced that Guevara, Conti, and Kazarian would face American Top Team (Sky, Page, and VanZant) at Double or Nothing where if Guevara's team loses, neither Guevara or Kazarian can challenge for the TNT Championship as long as Sky is champion.

== Event ==
Other on-screen personnel
Role	Name
Commentators	Jim Ross (PPV)
Commentators	Excalibur (Pre-show and PPV)
Commentators	Tony Schiavone (Pre-show and PPV)
Commentators	Taz (Pre-show and Tag Title match)
Commentators	Caprice Coleman (Young Bucks vs. Hardys)
Spanish commentators	Dasha Gonzalez
Spanish commentators	Jon Cruz
French commentators	Alain Mistrangélo
French commentators	Norbert Feuillan
German commentators	Günter Zapf
German commentators	Mike Ritter
Ring announcer	Justin Roberts
Referees	Aubrey Edwards
Referees	Bryce Remsburg
Referees	Mike Chioda
Referees	Paul Turner
Referees	Rick Knox
Referees	Stephon Smith
Interviewer	Lexy Nair

=== The Buy-In ===
During the Double or Nothing Buy-In pre-show, Hookhausen (Hook and Danhausen) faced Tony Nese and Mark Sterling. In the end, Hook suplexed Sterling and tagged in Danhausen, who pinned Sterling to win the match.

=== Preliminary matches ===
The actual pay-per-view opened with MJF facing Wardlow. At the start of the match, MJF ducked to ringside and told the referee to make Wardlow back up. A short time later, MJF donned the Dynamite Diamond Ring, but the referee saw it and took it away. MJF tried to shake hands with Wardlow, who obliged and then held onto his hand. Wardlow would then perform ten consecutive powerbombs on MJF to win the match; since Wardlow won, he was granted his release from his contract with MJF and free to officially join AEW.

Next, The Hardys (Jeff Hardy and Matt Hardy) faced The Young Bucks (Matt Jackson and Nick Jackson), who were accompanied by Brandon Cutler. During the match, Nick performed a springboard into a facebuster on Jeff. Later, Matt Jackson gave Jeff a Twist of Fate. Outside the ring, Jeff landed a Swanton Bomb on Matt Jackson through the steel steps. Back in the ring, Matt Hardy performed a Twist of Fate on Nick for a nearfall. In the end, Matt Hardy performed a second Twist of Fate on Nick and tagged in Jeff, who followed with a Swanton Bomb on Nick to win the match.

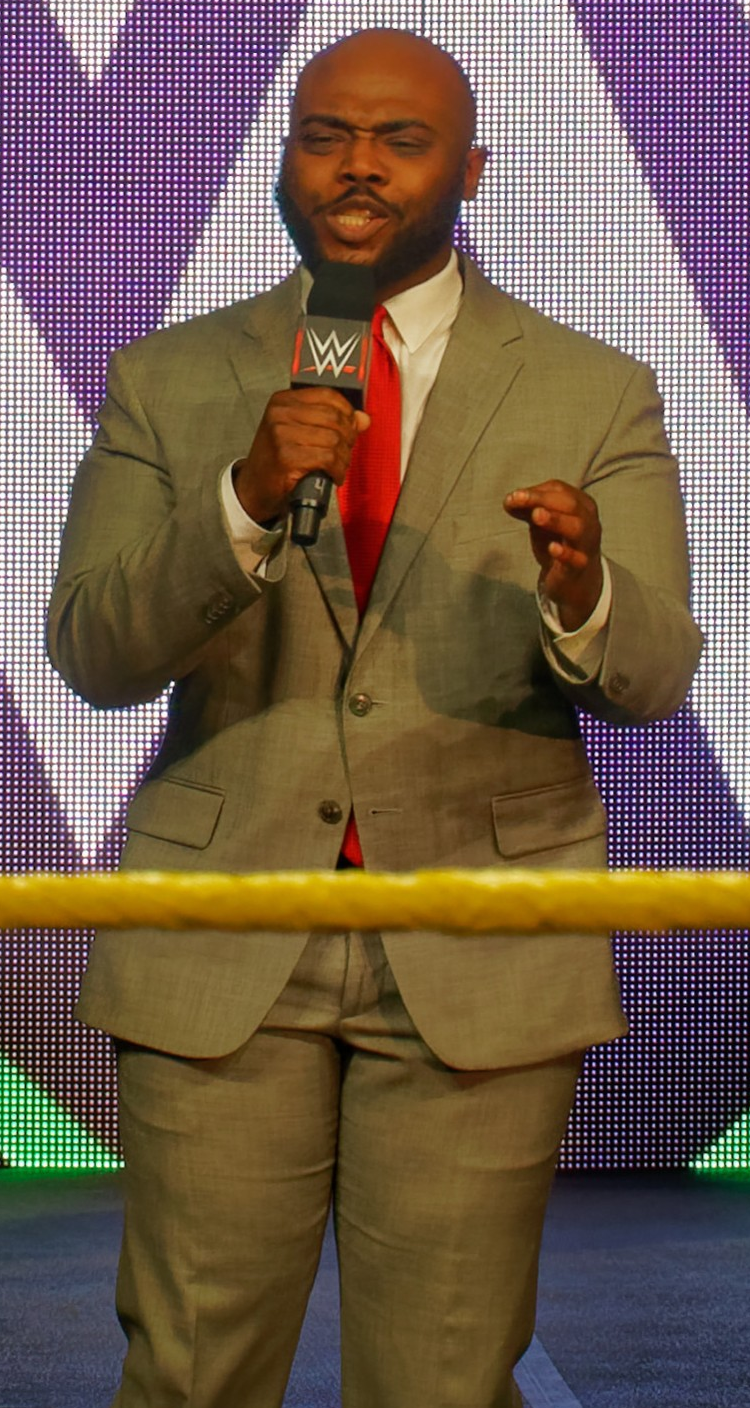
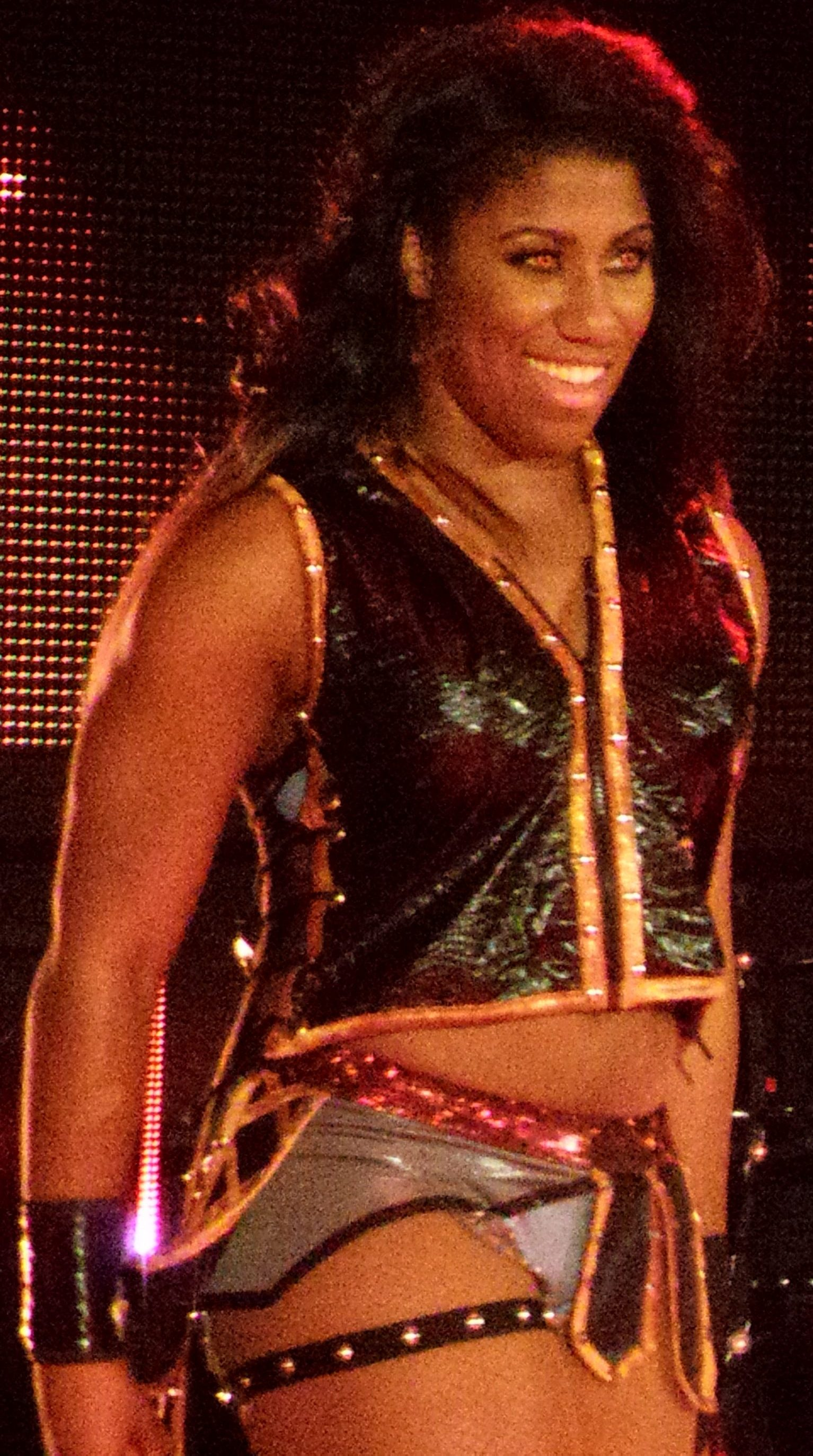
Both Stokely Hathaway (left) and Athena (right) made their AEW debuts at the event.

After that, Jade Cargill defended the AEW TBS Championship against Anna Jay. Mark Sterling made his way to ringside with a crutch in hand and argued with the referee. Jay performed a leg sweep on Cargill with the crutch for a nearfall. John Silver ran out and performed a brainbuster on Sterling. Stokely Hathaway walked out and stood at ringside, making his unannounced AEW debut. Cargill performed a Jaded on Jay from the top rope to retain the title.

Following the match, Kiera Hogan and Red Velvet held up Jay for Cargill. Kris Statlander ran out and stared down the trio. They were interrupted by Athena in her unannounced AEW debut, who allied with Jay and Statlander. Hathaway led The Baddies out of the ring without any physicality.

The next match was between Death Triangle (Pac, Penta Oscuro, and Rey Fénix), who were accompanied by Alex Abrahantes, against The House of Black (Malakai Black, Buddy Matthews, and Brody King) in a six-man tag team match. Penta landed a Canadian Destroyer on Matthews on the apron. Pac performed a 450 splash on Black from the top rope. Abrahantes distracted the referee while Pac took advantage and hit Black with a low blow. Pac went up top for a Black Arrow, but the lights went off. When the lights turned on, Julia Hart was standing in the ring and blew a mist in the face of Pac. Black hit a Black Mass on Pac to win the match. After the match, Hart celebrated the victory with The House of Black, becoming the stable's newest member, finally leaving The Varsity Blonds, and leaving Brian Pillman Jr. and Griff Garrison in shock.

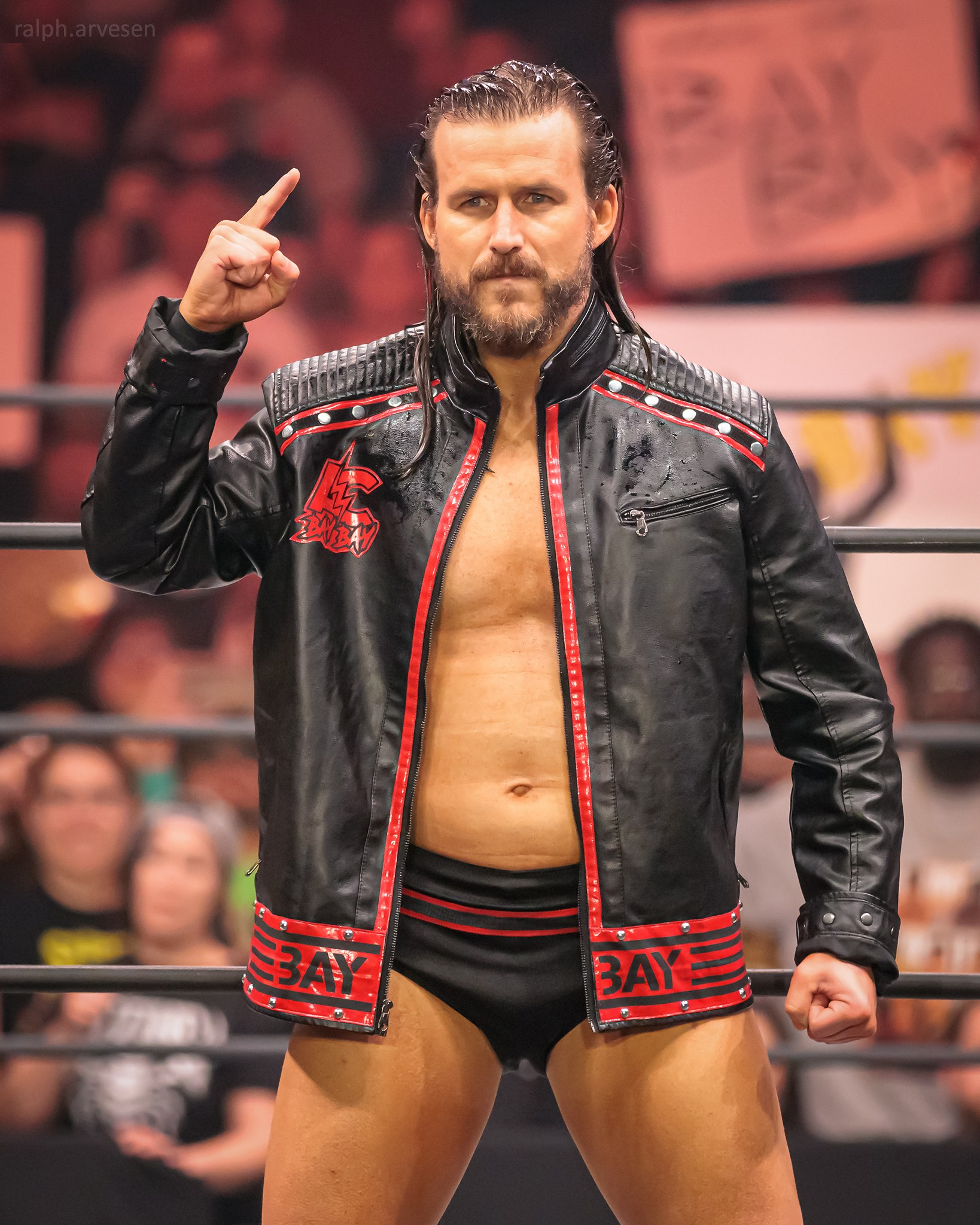
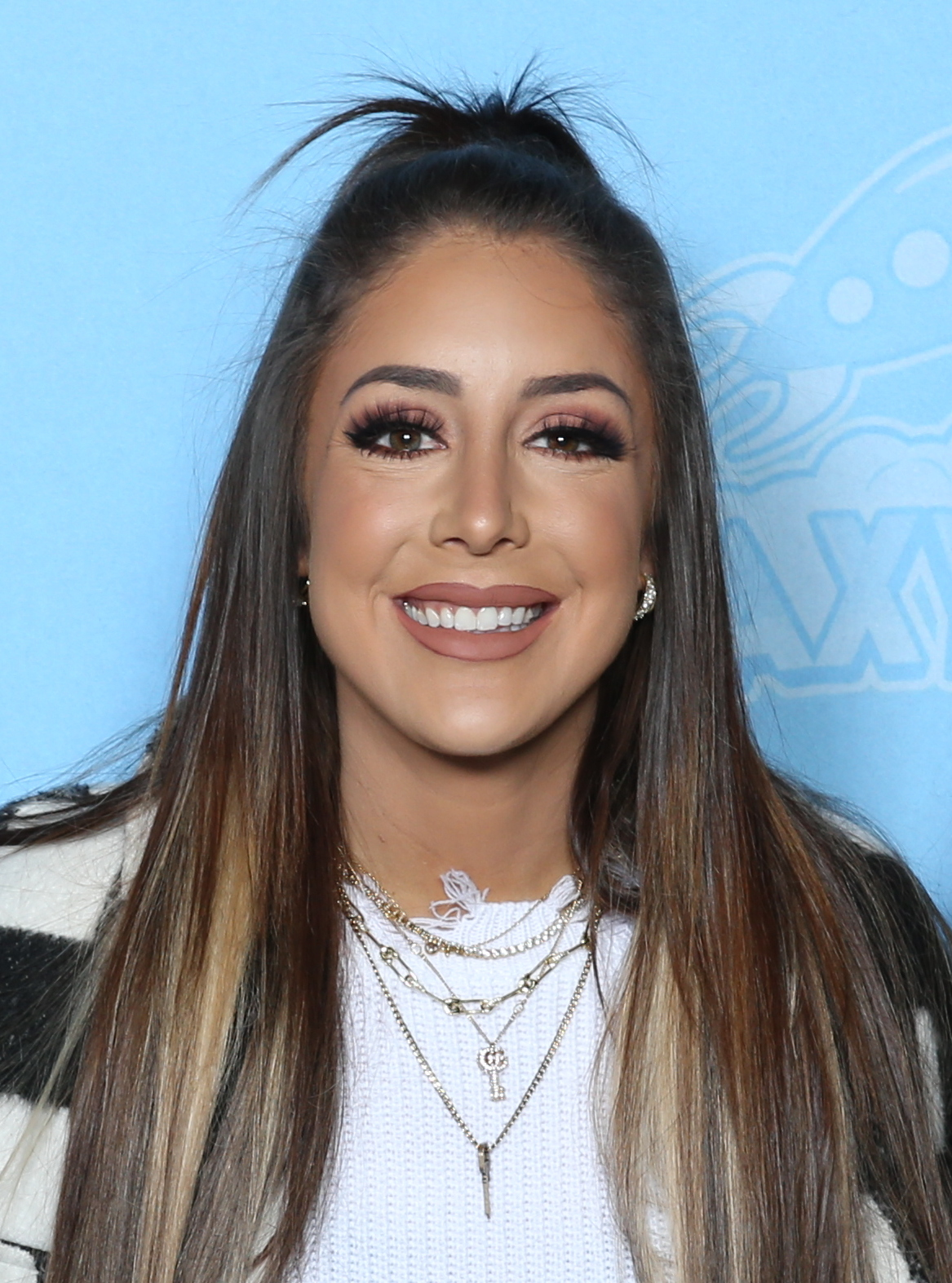
Adam Cole (left) and Dr. Britt Baker, D.M.D (right) were the inaugural winners of the Owen Hart Cup.

Next, the Men's Owen Hart Foundation Tournament finals took place as Adam Cole faced Samoa Joe. As the match was continuing, Bobby Fish distracted Joe long enough for Cole to take advantage and perform the Boom on Joe for the victory and to win the Men's Owen Hart Foundation Tournament.

The sixth match was the Women's Owen Hart Foundation Tournament finals as Dr. Britt Baker, D.M.D faced Ruby Soho. Soho applied a sharpshooter on Baker, who grabbed the rope to void the submission. In the end, Soho went to the ropes and put herself on the shoulders of Baker before performing a victory roll for a nearfall. Baker reversed it and got the victory and to win the Women's Owen Hart Foundation Tournament.

After the match, Dr. Martha Hart was introduced by commentator Tony Schiavone, who thanked the fans for the warm welcome while Cole and Baker stood on opposite sides of the stage. She thanked various people from AEW and her children. Martha presented the Owen Hart Foundation Tournament belt that she handed to Cole first, and handed the second Owen Hart Foundation Tournament belt to Baker.

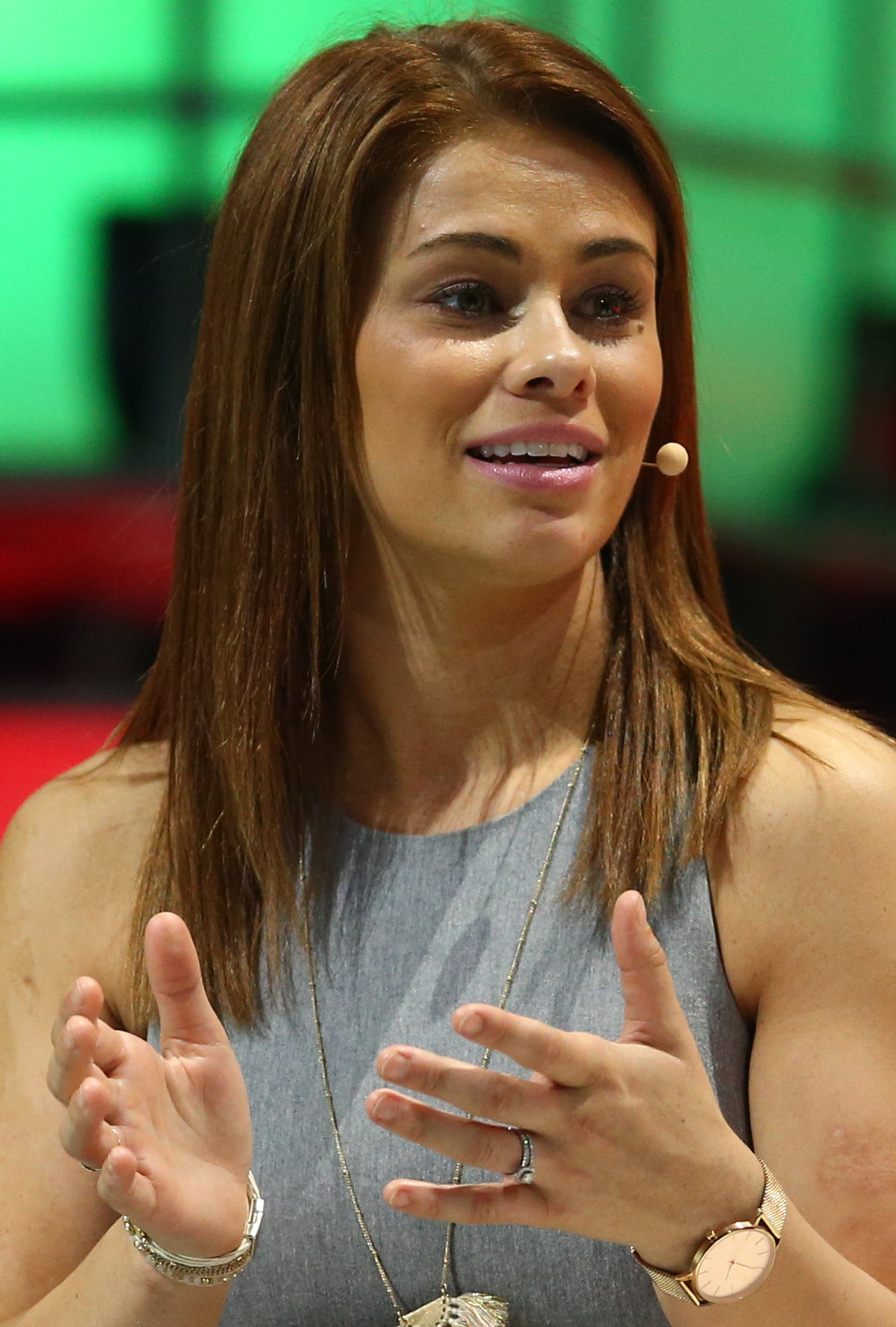
MMA fighter Paige VanZant made her in-ring debut at the event.

Later, American Top Team (Ethan Page, Scorpio Sky, Paige VanZant) were accompanied by Dan Lambert to face Frankie Kazarian, Sammy Guevara, and Tay Conti in a six-person mixed tag team match. During the match, VanZant performed a Michinoku Driver on Conti for a nearfall. In the end, Guevara attempted a superkick on Kazarian, who ducked, causing him to hit Conti instead. Kazarian tossed Guevara to ringside, allowing Page to perform a roundhouse kick on Kazarian, with Sky following up with a TKO on the latter for the victory; since American Top Team won, neither Kazarian nor Guevara are allowed to challenge for the TNT Championship again as long as Sky is champion. This marked Paige VanZant's first win in AEW.

Next, Darby Allin took on Kyle O'Reilly. When Allin went for another suicide dive, O'Reilly countered and applied a guillotine choke on Allin. Back in the ring, Allin performed the Last Supper cradle pin attempt on O'Reilly for a nearfall. In the final moments, O'Reilly performed three PK kicks on Allin, and landed a knee drop from the top rope for the victory.

Subsequently, Thunder Rosa defended the AEW Women's World Championship against Serena Deeb. Rosa performed a Death Valley Driver on Deeb for a nearfall. Deeb then applied a figure-four leglock on Rosa, where they ended up rolling out of the ring to the floor, which broke the hold. Back in the ring, Deeb applied the Serenity Lock, which she released and put Rosa down with a powerbomb. Moments later, Deeb avoided a charging Rosa, who crashed in the corner. Deeb went to the ropes and was cut off by Rosa, who executed a top rope superplex. Rosa followed with a Fire Thunder Driver on Deeb to retain the title.

Following this was an Anarchy in the Arena match between The Jericho Appreciation Society (Chris Jericho, Daniel Garcia, Jake Hager, Angelo Parker, and Matt Menard) against The Blackpool Combat Club (Bryan Danielson and Jon Moxley), Eddie Kingston, Santana, and Ortiz. When the latter were entering from various places in the arena, the brawl started while Moxley's "Wild Thing" theme song continued to play. Later, Jericho smashed the soundboard to stop the music from playing. Garcia performed a piledriver on Ortiz through the steel steps. Jericho put Moxley in the Walls of Jericho on a table, but it collapsed a second after he applied the move. As Danielson and Moxley were applying the LeBell Lock and bulldog choke on Jericho and Hager respectively, Kingston walked down the ramp with a can of gasoline and poured it on Jericho while Danielson had him in a hold. Danielson took exception and fought with Kingston, with Moxley trying to break them up. Danielson drove a steel chair into Jericho's face and performed a running knee at the same time for a nearfall. Hager hit Danielson from behind with Jericho's bat. Jericho applied the Walls of Jericho on Danielson while Hager choked the latter with a cable. Danielson passed out, thus the Jericho Appreciation Society won the match by technical submission.

In the penultimate match, Jurassic Express (Jungle Boy and Luchasaurus) (accompanied by Christian Cage) defended the AEW World Tag Team Championship against Swerve In Our Glory (Keith Lee and Swerve Strickland) and Team Taz (Powerhouse Hobbs and Ricky Starks). Boy attempted another suicide dive on Strickland, but Lee caught him and powerbombed him onto the back of Luchasaurus. As Luchasaurus went for a double chokeslam, Lee and Hobbs both grabbed him and slammed him instead. Hobbs leapt from the ropes and performed a double blockbuster on Lee and Luchasaurus. Moments later, Starks had Boy pinned and used the ropes for leverage until Cage shoved his feet off the ropes. Lee held up Boy while Strickland performed a Swerve Stomp. In the end, Boy and Luchasaurus performed the Thoracic Express on Strickland to retain the titles.

=== Main event ===
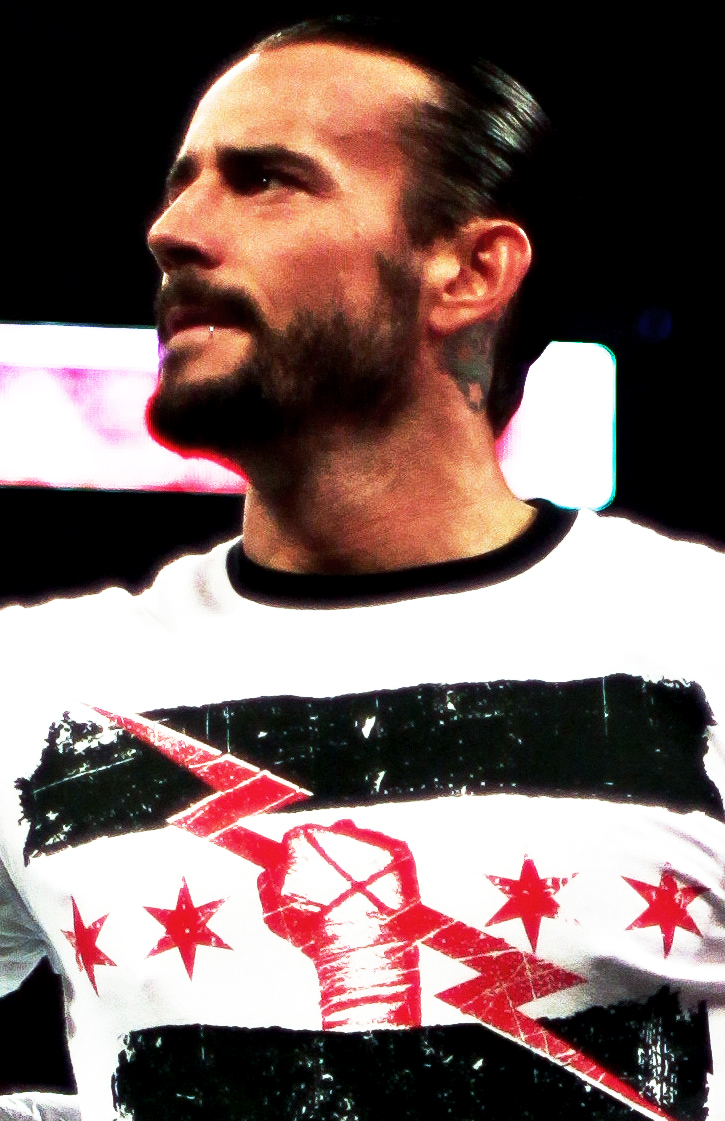
In the main event, CM Punk defeated "Hangman" Adam Page to win the AEW World Championship. This was also his first world championship win in over 10 years.

In the main event, "Hangman" Adam Page defended the AEW World Championship against CM Punk. Page went for a Buckshot Lariat, but Punk countered and applied the sharpshooter on Page, who managed to touch the ropes to void the submission. Punk landed a roundhouse kick on Page, who performed the Go To Sleep on Punk for a nearfall. As Page went to the apron and attempted another Buckshot Lariat on Punk, the latter caught him and when he hoisted up Page for the GTS, Page's boots incapacitated the referee. Page picked up the AEW World Championship belt and wanted to strike Punk with the belt, however, Page looked conflicted and tossed the belt back in a corner of the ring. In the culmination of the match, Page's knee buckled during the execution of a Buckshot Lariat, allowing Punk to perform the GTS and win the title. This marked Punk's first world championship win since 2011.

== Reception ==
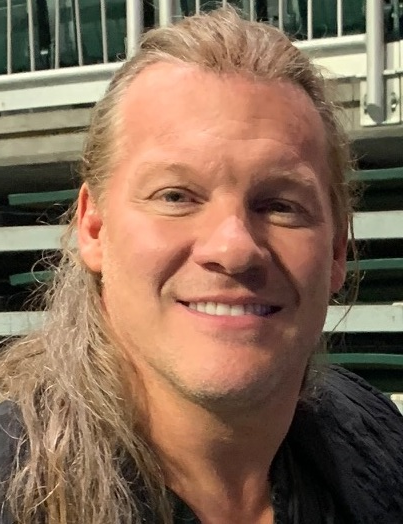
Critics gave critical acclaim to the Anarchy in the Arena match between the Jericho Appreciation Society and The Blackpool Combat Club, Eddie Kingston, Santana and Ortiz.

Double or Nothing received generally mixed to positive reviews from critics; however, much criticism was drawn towards the overall runtime of the event. For CBS Sports, Brent Brookhouse wrote that the event was an "uncharacteristically uneven" pay-per-view event for AEW. Cargill-Jay was "rough", the trios match between Death Triangle and House of Black was a "thrilling" action from start to finish, Baker–Soho was "a solid match that had a questionable winner", Deeb–Rosa was "a very nice showing for the AEW women's division" as both showed some solid technical skills and grit to put on a "fine match", the Anarchy in the Arena match was "a wild bloodbath", the tag team championship three-way between Jurassic Express, Swerve in Our Glory and Team Taz was "fun", and the main event was "a bit clunky at times" and "fine" when they just went at each other.

Justin Barrasso of Sports Illustrated opined that although Double or Nothing "ran too long", it still had its "share of standout moments". Barasso thought there was no more significant moment at Double or Nothing than Punk regaining his place atop the wrestling world, the tag team championship three-way match was "outstanding", the Anarchy in the Arena match was an "unforgettable gore", Rosa–Deeb was a "technical brilliance", O'Reilly–Allin was "very good", and Baker–Soho was "one of the best on the card".

Writing for Pro Wrestling Dot Net, Jason Powell stated that the event was "enjoyable". The Hardys–Bucks tag match exceeded his expectations, the six-man tag team was a "very good spotfest", Rosa–Deeb was "well-worked", the Anarchy in the Arena was "crazy enough that it could spark more interest in the feud", the tag team championship three-way was "entertaining", and the AEW World Championship was "a good main event."

Combat sports journalist Dave Meltzer for the Wrestling Observer Newsletter assigned star ratings to the event, with the highest rated match being the Anarchy in the Arena, which was rated 5 stars. Elsewhere on the card, the main event, the three-way tag, and the six-man tag team all received 4 1/2 stars out of 5. Rosa–Deeb was assigned 4 1/4 stars, and the Hardys-Bucks tag match received 4 stars. The lowest rated match on the show was Cargill–Jay, which was given 1 3/4 stars.

== Aftermath ==
During the Double or Nothing weekend, MJF no-showed a fan fest. When management tried calling him, he did not answer his phone. This came after months of rumors about the backstage tension between MJF and AEW owner Tony Khan about MJF's contract and payment he felt he should have, as well as doing an interview with Ariel Helwani without telling management. On the following episode of Dynamite, MJF stated that he was not being respected by the fans and Khan. He eventually mentioned all the "ex-WWE" guys that he believes Khan treats better than him. The segment ended with MJF demanding to be fired by Khan, calling Khan a "fucking mark", his microphone being cut off, and the screen going black. The next day, MJF's profile was removed from AEW's website and his merchandise was pulled on AEW's merchandise site.

On the June 3 episode of Rampage, CM Punk announced that he was injured and required surgery. He initially wanted to relinquish the title; however, Tony Khan decided that an interim champion would be crowned until Punk's return. Punk would then face the interim champion to determine the undisputed champion. To determine the interim champion, AEW set up matches called the AEW Interim World Championship Eliminator Series that will culminate in a match at Forbidden Door on June 26, a co-promoted event between AEW and New Japan Pro-Wrestling (NJPW). The first two matches took place on the June 8 episode of Dynamite. A Casino Battle Royale opened the show, which Kyle O'Reilly won. Then O'Reilly faced the number one ranked singles competitor Jon Moxley in the main event of the episode, which Moxley won. The third match took place on June 12 at Dominion 6.12 in Osaka-jo Hall between Hiroshi Tanahashi and Hirooki Goto, which Tanahashi won. Moxley and Tanahashi competed in a match for the interim championship at Forbidden Door, in which Moxley won.

== Results ==
No.	Results	Stipulations	Times
1^{P}	Hookhausen (Hook and Danhausen) defeated Tony Nese and Mark Sterling by pinfall	Tag team match	5:20
2	Wardlow defeated MJF by pinfall	Singles match Since Wardlow won, he was granted his release from his contract with MJF and subsequently signed by AEW. Had MJF won, Wardlow would be permanently banned from signing with AEW.	7:30
3	The Hardys (Jeff Hardy and Matt Hardy) defeated The Young Bucks (Matt Jackson and Nick Jackson) (with Brandon Cutler) by pinfall	Tag team match	19:15
4	Jade Cargill (c) defeated Anna Jay by pinfall	Singles match for the AEW TBS Championship	7:25
5	The House of Black (Malakai Black, Buddy Matthews, and Brody King) defeated Death Triangle (Pac, Penta Oscuro, and Rey Fénix) (with Alex Abrahantes) by pinfall	Six-man tag team match	15:35
6	Adam Cole defeated Samoa Joe by pinfall	Men's Owen Hart Foundation Tournament Final	12:30
7	Dr. Britt Baker, D.M.D. defeated Ruby Soho by pinfall	Women's Owen Hart Foundation Tournament Final	13:20
8	American Top Team (Ethan Page, Scorpio Sky, and Paige VanZant) (with Dan Lambert) defeated Frankie Kazarian, Sammy Guevara, and Tay Conti by pinfall	Six-person mixed tag team match Since American Top Team won, neither Kazarian nor Guevara were allowed to challenge for the TNT Championship during the rest of Sky's tenure as champion.	12:30
9	Kyle O'Reilly defeated Darby Allin by pinfall	Singles match	9:50
10	Thunder Rosa (c) defeated Serena Deeb by pinfall	Singles match for the AEW Women's World Championship	16:55
11	The Jericho Appreciation Society (Chris Jericho, Daniel Garcia, Jake Hager, Angelo Parker, and Matt Menard) defeated The Blackpool Combat Club (Bryan Danielson and Jon Moxley), Eddie Kingston, Santana and Ortiz by technical submission	Anarchy in the Arena match	22:45
12	Jurassic Express (Jungle Boy and Luchasaurus) (c) (with Christian Cage) defeated Swerve In Our Glory (Keith Lee and Swerve Strickland) and Team Taz (Powerhouse Hobbs and Ricky Starks) by pinfall	Three-way tag team match for the AEW World Tag Team Championship	17:15
13	CM Punk defeated "Hangman" Adam Page (c) by pinfall	Singles match for the AEW World Championship	25:40
(c) / – the champion(s) heading into the match; P / – the match was broadcast on the pre-show

== See also ==
- 2022 in professional wrestling
