= AEW Revolution (2023) =

All Elite Wrestling pay-per-view event

Revolution
- Promotional poster featuring various AEW wrestlers
- Promotion: All Elite Wrestling
- Date: March 5, 2023
- City: San Francisco, California
- Venue: Chase Center
- Attendance: 9,000
- Buy rate: 145,000

Pay-per-view chronology
← Previous; Full Gear	Next → Double or Nothing

Revolution chronology
← Previous; 2022	Next → 2024

The 2023 Revolution was the fourth annual Revolution professional wrestling pay-per-view (PPV) event produced by All Elite Wrestling (AEW). It took place on March 5, 2023, at the Chase Center in San Francisco, California, marking AEW's first PPV to be held in California.

Nine matches were contested at the event, including one on the Zero Hour pre-show. In the main event, MJF defeated Bryan Danielson 4–3 in sudden death overtime of a 60-minute Iron Man match to retain the AEW World Championship. In other prominent matches, The House of Black (Malakai Black, Brody King, and Buddy Matthews) defeated The Elite (Kenny Omega, Matt Jackson, and Nick Jackson) to win the AEW World Trios Championship, "Hangman" Adam Page defeated Jon Moxley by submission in a Texas Death match, and in the opening bout, Ricky Starks defeated Chris Jericho.

The event received critical acclaim, particularly for 60-minute Iron Man match between MJF and Bryan Danielson, as well as the Texas Death Match between "Hangman" Adam Page and Jon Moxley.

== Production ==
=== Background ===
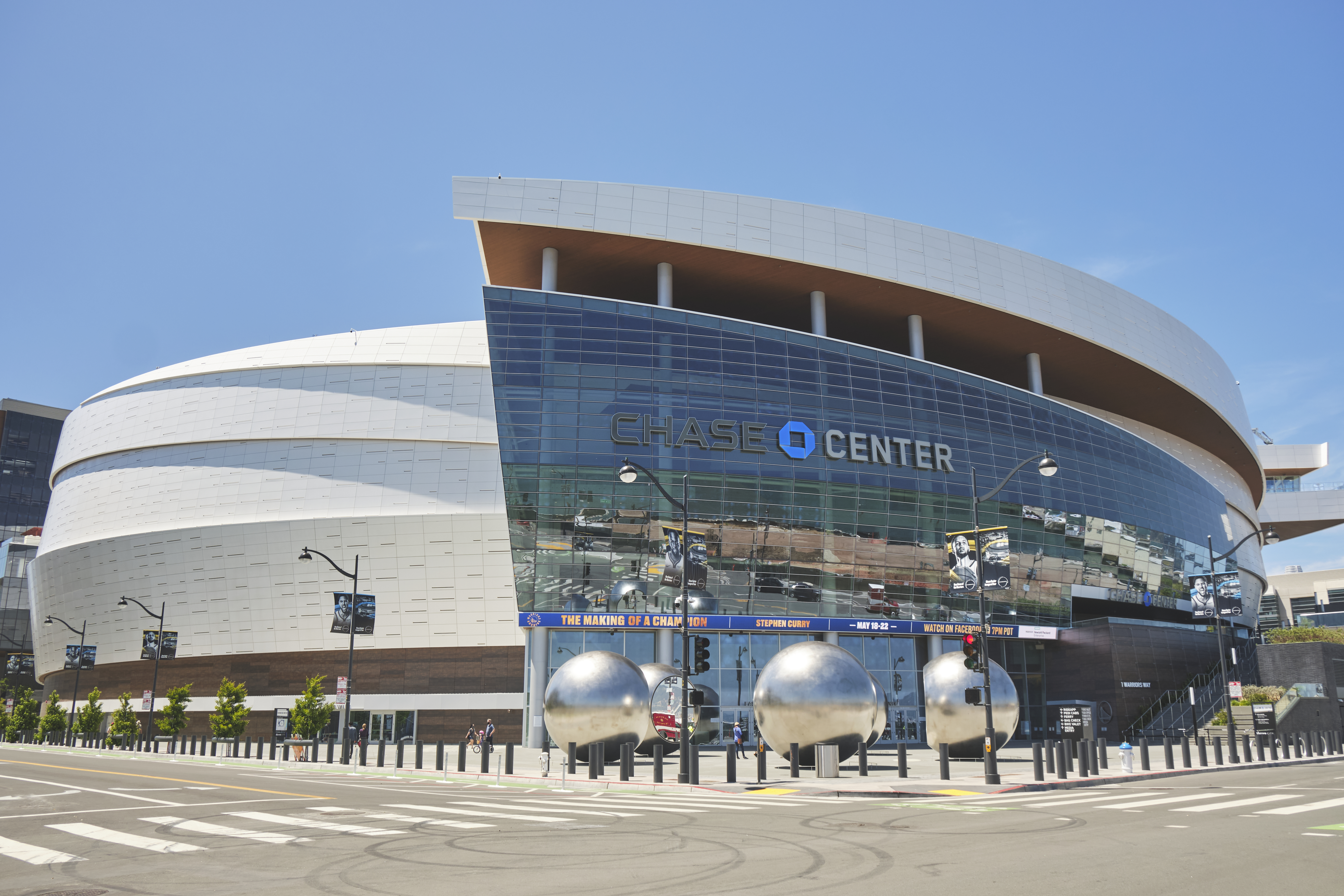
The event was held at the Chase Center in San Francisco, California, marking All Elite Wrestling's first pay-per-view event held in California.

Revolution is a professional wrestling pay-per-view (PPV) event held annually by All Elite Wrestling (AEW) since 2020—it was originally held in late February but moved to early March in 2021. It is one of AEW's "Big Four" PPVs, which also includes Double or Nothing, All Out, and Full Gear, their four biggest domestic shows produced quarterly. During Full Gear's post-event media scrum on November 20, 2022, AEW announced that the fourth Revolution event would take place on March 5, 2023, at Chase Center in San Francisco, California, marking AEW's first PPV to be held in California. Tickets went on sale on December 9, 2022. As part of the week leading up to the event, both Wednesday Night Dynamite and Friday Night Rampage aired live from the nearby Cow Palace on March 1 and 3, respectively. In addition to PPV, AEW partnered with Joe Hand Promotions to broadcast Revolution in select theaters, bars, and restaurants across North America.

=== Storylines ===
Revolution featured professional wrestling matches that involved different wrestlers from pre-existing feuds and storylines. Storylines were produced on AEW's weekly television programs, Dynamite and Rampage, as well as the supplementary online streaming shows, Dark and Elevation.

At Full Gear, MJF defeated Jon Moxley to win the AEW World Championship with assistance from William Regal, the leader of the Blackpool Combat Club (BCC), who betrayed Moxley. Two weeks later, MJF double crossed Regal and attacked his badly damaged neck with Regal's brass knuckles. This drew out, and the ire of, Bryan Danielson, another member of the BCC and one of Regal's proteges. MJF later stated that if Danielson wanted a title match against him at Revolution, he would have to win all of his singles matches in a one-month period, which Danielson agreed to on the condition that their match at the PPV would be a 60-minute Iron Man match. Danielson went on to defeat Konosuke Takeshita, Bandido, Brian Cage, and Timothy Thatcher, before defeating Rush on the February 8 episode of Dynamite to make the World Championship match at Revolution official.

At the special Dynamite: Championship Fight Night, The Gunns (Austin Gunn and Colten Gunn) defeated The Acclaimed (Anthony Bowens and Max Caster) to win the AEW World Tag Team Championship. The following week, a three-way tag team match for the title was scheduled for Revolution between The Gunns and the winners of the Revolution Tag Team Battle Royal and Casino Tag Team Royale, but the match was changed to a four-way tag team match after The Acclaimed invoked their rematch clause. On the February 22 episode of Dynamite, Jay Lethal and Jeff Jarrett won the Revolution Tag Team Battle Royal to be added to the match, while on the following episode, Orange Cassidy and Danhausen won the Tag Team Casino Battle Royale to secure the final spot.

At Full Gear, Samoa Joe defeated Wardlow and Powerhouse Hobbs in a three-way match to win the AEW TNT Championship. On December 28 at Dynamite: New Year's Smash, Joe retained his title against Wardlow. On February 1, Wardlow returned and attacked Joe, after he regained the TNT Championship against Darby Allin in a No Holds Barred match. Two weeks later, a rematch between Joe and Wardlow for the title was scheduled for Revolution.

== Event ==
Other on-screen personnel
Role	Name
Commentators	Excalibur (Pre-show and PPV)
Commentators	Jim Ross (PPV)
Commentators	Tony Schiavone (Pre-show and PPV)
Commentators	Taz (Pre-show and PPV)
Ring announcer	Justin Roberts
Referees	Aubrey Edwards
Referees	Bryce Remsburg
Referees	Paul Turner
Referees	Rick Knox
Referees	Stephon Smith
Interviewer	Renee Paquette

=== Pre-show ===
In the Zero Hour pre-show, Mark Briscoe and The Lucha Brothers (Penta El Zero Miedo and Rey Fenix) (accompanied by Alex Abrahantes) took on Ari Daivari and The Varsity Athletes (Josh Woods and Tony Nese) (accompanied by Mark Sterling). The former won after Mark delivered the Froggy Bow on Daivari. After the match, Abrahantes beat down Sterling.

=== Preliminary matches ===
The opening contest was a match between Chris Jericho and Ricky Starks. In the closing stages, Jericho hit a baseball bat on Starks and was looking for a Judas Effect, but Starks countered it into the Roshambo for the win.

The next match was a Final Burial match contested between "Jungle Boy" Jack Perry and Christian Cage, in which the only way to win was to put your opponent into the casket and shut the lid. Perry won after delivering two con-chair-tos. He then tossed Cage into the casket and slammed the lid shut.

Next, The Elite defended the AEW World Trios Championship against The House of Black. In the end, The Elite hit the BTE Trigger, but Buddy Matthews made the save. As Matt Jackson was setting up for the Meltzer Driver, Brody King hit the Dante's Inferno and Malakai Black made the pin, making them the first team to win the trios titles on an AEW PPV card.

In the next match, Jamie Hayter (with Dr. Britt Baker, D.M.D.) defended the AEW Women's World Championship against Ruby Soho and Saraya (with Toni Storm). Saraya performed a leg lace chickenwing on Ruby, but Hayter then hit a lariat on Saraya. Ruby then delivered Destination Unknown to Saraya. Hayter then delivered a majistral cradle on Ruby for the three-count. After the match, Ruby hit the Disaster Kick and Destination Unknown on Hayter and Britt and spray painted them both, therefore aligning herself with Storm and Saraya; and also turned her heel for the first time in her AEW career.

The next bout was a Texas Death match contested between Jon Moxley and "Hangman" Adam Page. In the opening stages, Moxley and Page both wrapped barbed wires around each other's faces, causing blood spillage on both men. Page then hit the barbed wire on Moxley. Moxley then stabbed Page with a fork on the head. As Moxley went to grab Moxley into the ring, Page delivered a clothesline. Page then hit the Dead Eye on the barbed wire-wrapped chair. As Page was looking for the Buckshot Lariat, Moxley countered it into the Death Rider. Moxley then stomped Page onto a brick pile. Moxley grabbed a chain, but Page grabbed one end of the chain, and hit a lariat. Page then hit the Buckshot Lariat, but the chain was still wrapped around Moxley's neck. Page forcefully pulled the chain, forcing Moxley to submit.

Next, Samoa Joe defended the TNT Championship against Wardlow. In the end, as Joe was looking for a Muscle Buster, Wardlow countered it into a powerbomb. As Wardlow was looking for another powerbomb (as in the Powerbomb Symphony), Joe rolled up Wardlow for a two-count, and immediately delivered a lariat. As Joe was looking for a powerbomb, Wardlow headbutted him and delivered a rear-naked choke, forcing Joe to pass out.

In the penultimate match, The Gunns (Austin Gunn and Colten Gunn) defended the AEW World Tag Team Championship against The Acclaimed (Anthony Bowens and Max Caster) (with Billy Gunn), Jeff Jarrett and Jay Lethal (with Sonjay Dutt and Satnam Singh), and Orange Cassidy and Danhausen. In the end, Caster hit the Mic Drop on Austin, but Colten broke up the pin. Jay Lethal then picked up a Golden Globe and hit it on Caster. The Gunns then delivered the 310 to Yuma on Danhausen for the win. After the match, FTR (Dax Harwood and Cash Wheeler) made their long awaited return and delivered the Big Rig to The Gunns.

=== Main event ===
In the main event, MJF defended the AEW World Championship against Bryan Danielson in a 60 minute Iron man match. In the opening stages, both men delivered simultaneous lariats to each other. MJF then delivered an elevated hammerlock DDT to Danielson. Danielson then delivered a sunset flip powerbomb. Danielson then started hitting Yes! kicks and running dropkicks in the corner. Danielson then delivered the Busaiku Knee to score the first fall (MJF 0 vs. Danielson 1). Immediately after MJF hit a low blow and he was disqualified, giving Danielson another fall (MJF 0 vs. Danielson 2). MJF then pinned Danielson twice, as he was still feeling the effects of the low blow, to score two falls (MJF 2 vs. Danielson 2). Danielson then wrapped MJF's knee around the steel post. As Danielson was looking for a superplex, MJF sent Danielson crashing to the outside of the floor. MJF then delivered a tombstone piledriver on the remnants of the timekeeper's table. Danielson was then busted open. MJF then dragged Danielson into the ring and delivered a Heat Seeker to pickup another fall (MJF 3 vs. Danielson 2). As MJF was looking to send Danielson into the ringpost, Danielson blocked and instead sent him into the ring post. Danielson then delivered a spider superplex, a diving headbutt, another Busaiku Knee, and the Regal Stretch, forcing MJF to submit (MJF 3 vs. Danielson 3). Danielson then locked in the LeBell Lock, but the timer ran out. The match then went to sudden death overtime. MJF then hit a lowblow on Danielson again, but Danielson kicked out. Danielson then locked in a single-leg Boston Crab, but MJF reached the ropes, and rolled to the outside. Unbeknownst to the referee, MJF hit Danielson with an oxygen tank and locked in the LeBell Lock, forcing Danielson to tap (MJF 4 vs. Danielson 3).

== Reception ==
Revolution received critical acclaim, particularly for both the Texas Death and Iron Man matches. Bryan Rose of the Wrestling Observer Newsletter called the event "one of the best shows of the year". He gave praise to the main event, which he called "one of the best 60-minute Iron Man matches in modern history" and a "masterclass" in storytelling. Rose also commended the "tremendous" Texas Death match between Jon Moxley and Adam Page, which was a "classic, bloody war". Elsewhere on the card, The Elite vs. The House of Black was "very fun", and Chris Jericho vs. Ricky Starks was a "solid opener".

Writing for 411MANIA, Robert Winfree gave the show a score of 8.9 out of 10, calling it a "very good show, but it didn't quite hit amazing...". He criticized the opening match, the Wardlow/Joe bout and the tag match, but praised the brutality of the Texas Death Match, and "emotional heat" of the Final Burial Match. He want on to praise the main event, describing it as "maybe the best pure wrestler of this generation breaking his back to legitimize MJF as the top dog in the company, with MJF more than holding his own along the way.". Winfree noted that the event was "a little cap to most of the AEW issues right now" and expressed excitement for the company's future.

Writing for Sports Illustrated, Bryan Alvarez wrote that the event "exceeded expectations", defying an "underwhelming" build. He opined that the main event was "assuredly the greatest Iron Man match in wrestling history", the Texas Death match was "preposterously bloody and violent", and the trios match was "outstanding", with the rest of show ranging from "good to great".

Dave Meltzer gave the AEW World Championship match 5.75 stars, making it the highest rated Iron Man match of all time, and the highest score of the night. The Texas Death match received 5 stars, The Ricky Starks vs. Chris Jericho match and the Final Burial match both received 4 stars each, the AEW World Trios Championship match received 4.75 stars, the AEW World Tag Team Championship match received 3.25 stars, the AEW Women's World Championship match got 3 stars and the TNT Championship bout was the lowest rated match, receiving 2.25 stars.

== Results ==
No.	Results	Stipulations	Times
1^{P}	Mark Briscoe and The Lucha Bros (Rey Fenix and Penta El Zero Miedo) (with Alex Abrahantes) defeated Ari Daivari and The Varsity Athletes (Josh Woods and Tony Nese) (with Mark Sterling) by pinfall	Trios match	12:50
2	Ricky Starks defeated Chris Jericho by pinfall	Singles match The Jericho Appreciation Society were banned from ringside.	13:35
3	"Jungle Boy" Jack Perry defeated Christian Cage	Final Burial match	14:50
4	House of Black (Malakai Black, Brody King, and Buddy Matthews) defeated The Elite (Kenny Omega, Matt Jackson, and Nick Jackson) (c) by pinfall	Trios match for the AEW World Trios Championship	18:00
5	Jamie Hayter (c) (with Dr. Britt Baker, D.M.D.) defeated Saraya (with Toni Storm) and Ruby Soho by pinfall	Three-way match for the AEW Women's World Championship	10:00
6	"Hangman" Adam Page defeated Jon Moxley by submission	Texas Death match	24:45
7	Wardlow defeated Samoa Joe (c) by technical submission	Singles match for the AEW TNT Championship	10:40
8	The Gunns (Austin Gunn and Colten Gunn) (c) defeated The Acclaimed (Anthony Bowens and Max Caster) (with Billy Gunn), Jay Lethal and Jeff Jarrett (with Sonjay Dutt and Satnam Singh), and Orange Cassidy and Danhausen by pinfall	Four-way tag team match for the AEW World Tag Team Championship	13:35
9	MJF (c) defeated Bryan Danielson 4–3 in sudden death overtime	60-minute Iron Man match for the AEW World Championship	1:05:20
(c) / – the champion(s) heading into the match; P / – the match was broadcast on the pre-show

=== Iron Man match ===
Score		Point winner	Decision	Notes	Time
MJF	Danielson	Point winner	Decision	Notes	Time
0	1	Bryan Danielson	Pinfall	Danielson pinned MJF after Busaiku Knee	25:28
0	2	Bryan Danielson	Disqualification	MJF was disqualified after he attacked Danielson with a low blow	26:35
1	2	MJF	Pinfall	MJF pinned Danielson with an inside cradle	26:43
2	2	MJF	Pinfall	MJF immediately pinned Danielson	26:46
3	2	MJF	Pinfall	MJF pinned Danielson after the Heat Seeker	40:30
3	3	Bryan Danielson	Submission	Danielson submitted MJF to the Regal Stretch	49:20
4	3	MJF	Submission	MJF submitted Danielson to the LeBell Lock	1:05:20

== See also ==
- 2023 in professional wrestling
- List of All Elite Wrestling pay-per-view events
