= AEW Revolution (2022) =

All Elite Wrestling pay-per-view event

Revolution
- Promotional poster featuring various AEW wrestlers
- Promotion: All Elite Wrestling
- Date: March 6, 2022
- City: Orlando, Florida
- Venue: Addition Financial Arena
- Attendance: 8,700
- Buy rate: 175,000

Pay-per-view chronology
← Previous; Full Gear	Next → Double or Nothing

Revolution chronology
← Previous; 2021	Next → 2023

The 2022 Revolution was a professional wrestling pay-per-view (PPV) event produced by All Elite Wrestling (AEW). It was the third annual Revolution and took place on March 6, 2022, at the Addition Financial Arena in Orlando, Florida. The event aired through traditional PPV providers, as well as Bleacher Report in the United States and FITE TV internationally. It was the culmination of a three-day event, which began with a live episode of Rampage on March 4 and a fan fest on March 5, both held at the same venue.

Twelve matches were contested at the event, including three on The Buy In pre-show. In the main event, "Hangman" Adam Page defeated Adam Cole to retain the AEW World Championship. In other prominent matches, CM Punk defeated MJF in a Dog Collar match, Jon Moxley defeated Bryan Danielson, and Wardlow won the Face of the Revolution ladder match.

The event was met with positive reviews from critics, and featured the AEW debuts of Swerve Strickland and William Regal.

== Production ==
=== Background ===
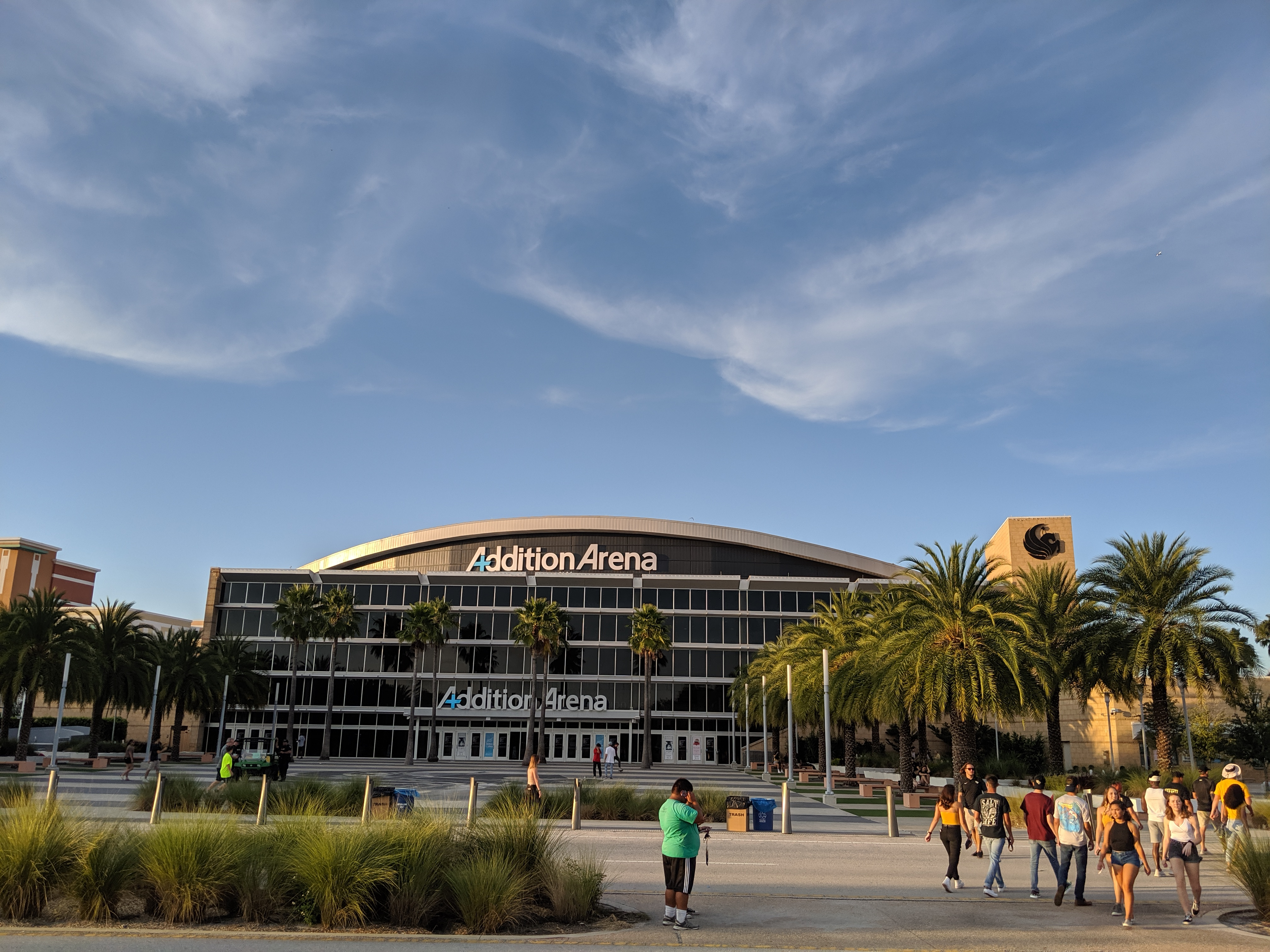
The event was held at the Addition Financial Arena in Orlando, Florida.

Revolution is a professional wrestling pay-per-view (PPV) event held annually by All Elite Wrestling (AEW) since 2020—it was originally held in late February but moved to early March in 2021. It is one of AEW's "Big Four" PPVs, which also includes Double or Nothing, All Out, and Full Gear, their four biggest domestic shows produced quarterly. During the December 8, 2021, episode of Wednesday Night Dynamite, AEW announced that the third Revolution event would take place on March 6, 2022, at the Addition Financial Arena in Orlando, Florida. Additionally, the go-home episode of Friday Night Rampage on March 4 as well as a fanfest on March 5—which included a concert featuring songs from the recently released AEW music album Who We Are: A Celebration of Excellence, Volume 1—were all held at the same venue, with the three-day event being promoted as a "weekend spectacular." Tickets went on sale on December 17, 2021, with a limited number of combo packages for the three-day event also available.

AEW partnered with Joe Hand Promotions to screen Revolution live across North America in select movie theaters. Immediately following the March 4 episode of Rampage, TNT aired a thirty-minute television special called Countdown to Revolution that previewed the event.

=== Storylines ===
Revolution featured professional wrestling matches that involved different wrestlers from pre-existing feuds and storylines. Storylines were produced on AEW's weekly television programs, Dynamite and Rampage, the supplementary online streaming shows, Dark and Elevation, and The Young Bucks' YouTube series Being The Elite.

On the February 9 episode of Dynamite, after successfully defending the AEW World Championship, "Hangman" Adam Page was confronted by Adam Cole, who indicated his intentions to challenge Page for the championship as he had reached the top of the rankings to become the number one contender. The following week, the match was made official for Revolution.

During Dynamite's debut episode on TBS on January 5, 2022, Jurassic Express (Jungle Boy and Luchasaurus) defeated The Lucha Brothers (Penta El Zero Miedo and Rey Fénix) to win the AEW World Tag Team Championship. After numerous title defenses, it was announced on the February 16 episode that Jurassic Express would defend the title in a three-way tag team match at Revolution. Their opponents would be determined by a tag team battle royal on the February 23 episode and a Casino Tag Team Royale on the March 2 episode. reDRagon (Bobby Fish and Kyle O'Reilly) and The Young Bucks (Matt Jackson and Nick Jackson) won the respective matches.

On the November 17, 2021, episode of Dynamite, CM Punk began feuding with MJF. After Punk defeated all of the other members of MJF's stable The Pinnacle over the next few weeks, the two finally faced each other on the February 2, 2022, episode where MJF won thanks to assistance from Wardlow, giving Punk his first loss in AEW, which was also in Punk's hometown of Chicago. On the February 9 episode, Punk demanded a rematch, which MJF would grant if Punk found a partner to defeat FTR (Cash Wheeler and Dax Harwood) in a tag team match that night. Jon Moxley was revealed as Punk's partner and they were victorious. The following week, Punk revealed the rematch against MJF would be a Dog Collar match at Revolution.

After remaining undefeated for months, Thunder Rosa became the number one contender to Dr. Britt Baker, D.M.D.'s AEW Women's World Championship, reigniting an old feud between the two. The title match was made official for Revolution on the February 16 episode of Dynamite.

On the February 23 episode of Dynamite, after Jade Cargill retained the TBS Championship against The Bunny, she touted her undefeated record of 28–0 and issued an open challenge for the title. Tay Conti came out to accept the challenge, and the match was made official for Revolution.

At the 2021 Revolution, AEW held the Face of the Revolution ladder match, with the winner receiving a match for the TNT Championship. A second match was scheduled for the 2022 event, thus establishing the match as an annual tradition at Revolution. Keith Lee, making his AEW debut, qualified first by defeating Isiah Kassidy on the February 9 episode of Dynamite. The remaining spots were filled over the next couple of weeks, with Wardlow, Powerhouse Hobbs, Ricky Starks, Orange Cassidy, and Christian Cage each qualifying by defeating Max Caster, Dante Martin, The Dark Order's Preston "10" Vance, Anthony Bowens, and Ethan Page, respectively.

Chris Jericho and Eddie Kingston began feuding after Kingston began insinuating to his friends (and Jericho's Inner Circle teammates) Proud and Powerful (Santana and Ortiz) that they were being held back from their full potential and should branch out on their own, which Jericho took offense to. After confronting each other on the February 23 episode of Dynamite, a match between the two was scheduled for Revolution.

On the January 19 episode of Dynamite, Jon Moxley returned after taking time off to battle alcoholism. In the following weeks, Moxley would be approached by Bryan Danielson about teaming up to "run" AEW and mentor the younger generation of wrestlers. On the February 16 episode, Moxley responded that he had never defeated Danielson regardless of what promotion they were both in and that he would only consider teaming up if they "bled together" first, indicating that he wanted a match. The following week, after Moxley saved Danielson from an attack by 2point0 (Jeff Parker and Matt Lee) and Daniel Garcia, Danielson agreed to the match at Revolution.

== Event ==
Other on-screen personnel
Role	Name
Commentators	Jim Ross (PPV)
Commentators	Excalibur (Pre-show and PPV)
Commentators	Tony Schiavone (Pre-show and PPV)
Commentators	Taz (Hook vs. Q. T. Marshall and Ladder match)
Spanish commentators	Alex Abrahantes (PPV)
Spanish commentators	Dasha Gonzalez (Pre-show and PPV)
Spanish commentators	Jon Cruz (Pre-show and PPV)
French commentators	Alain Mistrangélo
French commentators	Norbert Feuillan
German commentators	Günter Zapf
German commentators	Mike Ritter
Ring announcer	Justin Roberts
Referees	Aubrey Edwards
Referees	Bryce Remsburg
Referees	Paul Turner
Referees	Rick Knox
Referees	Stephon Smith

=== The Buy-In ===
On The Buy-In pre-show, three matches were contested. In the opener, Leyla Hirsch faced Kris Statlander. The match ended when, unbeknownst to the referee, Hirsch struck Statlander over the head with a spare turnbuckle from under the ring and then followed up with a moonsault press to win the match.

Next, commentator Tony Schiavone announced that he had a special guest. Schiavone introduced Kenny Omega but instead, Don Callis came out and stated that it was going to be a great night for The Elite and that Adam Cole would be a "great transitional champion" until Omega returns.

After that, Hook faced Q. T. Marshall. During the match, Marshall raked Hook's eyes and suplexed him. Marshall then attempted for a Diamond Cutter, but Hook countered and applied the Redrum on Marshall for the submission victory.

In the final match of the pre-show, The House of Black (Malakai Black, Brody King, and Buddy Matthews) faced Death Triangle (Pac and Penta Oscuro) (accompanied by Alex Abrahantes) and Erick Redbeard. In the end, Redbeard attempted a double chokeslam, but Black countered and spit black mist into his eyes, followed by Matthews then hitting a knee strike, and King following with an inverted piledriver, before Black pinned Redbeard to secure the victory.

=== Preliminary matches ===
The pay-per-view opened with Chris Jericho facing Eddie Kingston. At the start of the match, Kingston performed a half and half suplex on Jericho. Jericho suplexed Kingston off the ring apron. Back in the ring, Jericho performed back to back German suplexes on Kingston. Jericho placed Kingston in the Walls of Jericho, who grabbed the rope to avoid the submission. Kingston dropped Jericho with a spinning back fist for a nearfall. Jericho performed a Codebreaker for a nearfall. As Jericho went for the Judas Effect, Kingston ducked it and performed another spinning back fist and applied the Stretch Plum submission on Jericho for the submission victory. After the match, Kingston attempted to shake the hand of Jericho (who stated before the match he would do so if Kingston defeated him), but Jericho instead refused and left the ring.

Next, Jurassic Express (Jungle Boy and Luchasaurus) defended the AEW World Tag Team Championship against reDRagon (Bobby Fish and Kyle O'Reilly) and The Young Bucks (Matt Jackson and Nick Jackson) (accompanied by Brandon Cutler). During the match, O'Reilly hit Jungle Boy with the title belt for a nearfall. reDRagon performed the high-low combination on Jungle Boy, but Luchasaurus broke up the pin. The Young Bucks delivered the BTE Trigger on Jungle Boy, but O'Reilly broke up the pin. Jungle Boy and Luchasaurus performed the Thoracic Express on Matt. Boy pinned Matt to retain the titles before Nick could break it up.

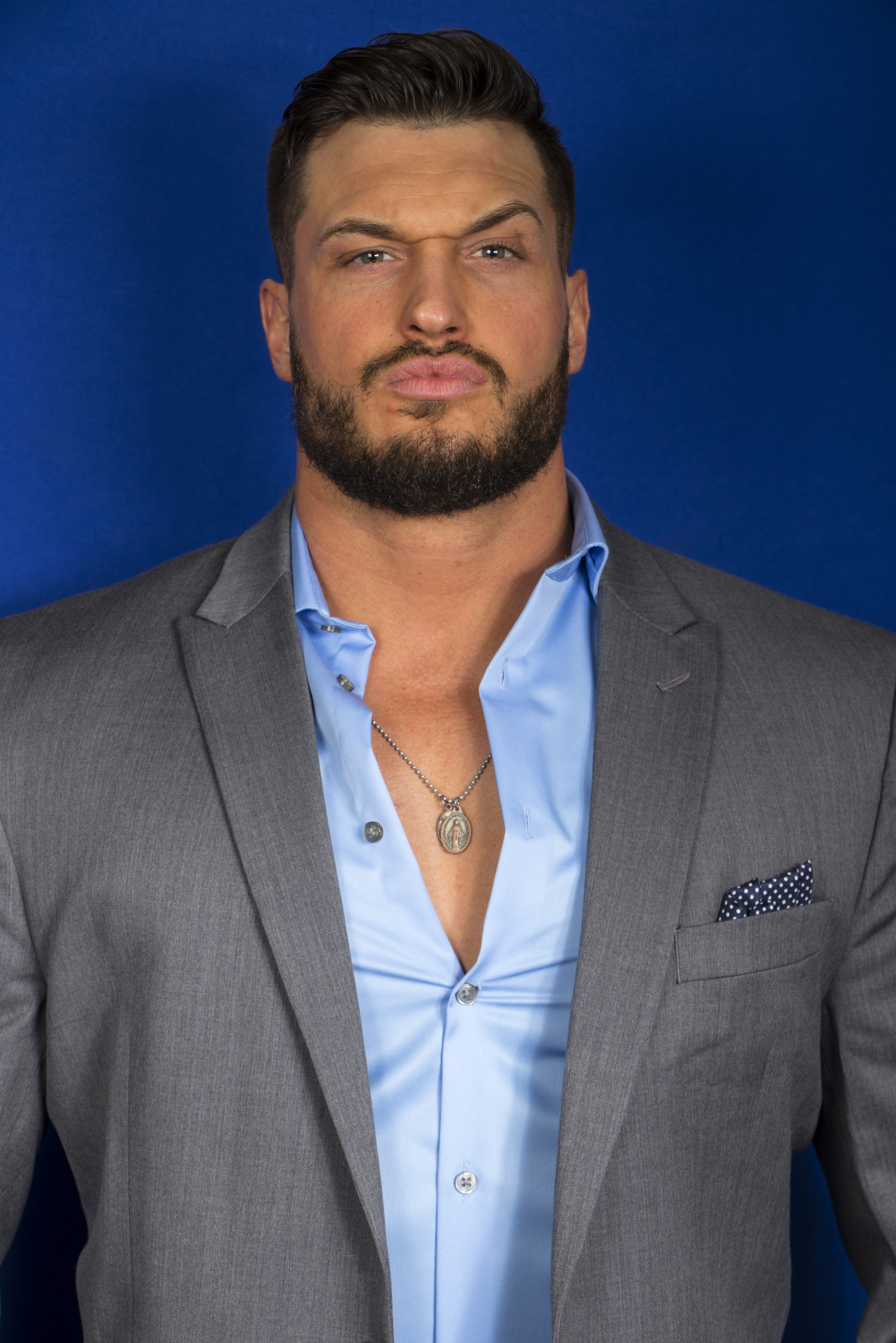
Wardlow was the winner of the Face of the Revolution Ladder match.

After that was the Face of the Revolution ladder match, with the winner receiving a match for the TNT Championship on the March 16 episode of Dynamite. The match participants were Keith Lee, Wardlow, Powerhouse Hobbs, Ricky Starks, Orange Cassidy, and Christian Cage. Late in the match, Danhausen appeared and cursed Starks. As Cage ascended the ladder, Wardlow stopped Cage and performed a powerbomb on him. As Starks ascended the ladder, Wardlow jumped up and performed a powerbomb on Starks off the ladder that was over the ropes. Wardlow then grabbed the giant brass ring to win the match.

Following this, Tony Schiavone stood on the stage with a contract as Shane "Swerve" Strickland made his unannounced AEW debut and signed the contract, officially joining AEW. Strickland was formerly known as Isaiah "Swerve" Scott in WWE.

In the fourth match, Jade Cargill (accompanied by "Smart" Mark Sterling) defended the TBS Championship against Tay Conti (accompanied by Anna Jay). Cargill kissed Conti at the start of the match to taunt her. Later, Conti kissed Cargill back and performed a DDTay for a nearfall. In the end, Cargill performed the Jaded on Conti, retaining the title and improving her undefeated record to 29–0.

Next, CM Punk faced MJF in a Dog Collar match. MJF entered first after teasing Punk's "Cult of Personality" theme song, followed by Punk, who came out to his former Ring of Honor (ROH) theme, "Miseria Cantare" by AFI. During the match, MJF wrapped the chain around his fist and struck Punk with it, making Punk bloodied. Punk went for the Go to Sleep, but MJF gouged Punk's eyes and applied the Salt of the Earth armbar. Punk escaped and put MJF into the Anaconda Vice, but MJF pulled Punk's hair into a pin attempt, forcing him to break the hold. Punk wrapped the chain around his right knee and delivered a shining wizard with the chain to MJF. MJF attempted a Tombstone Piledriver on the ring apron, but Punk hit him with the move instead. Back in the ring, MJF superplexed Punk onto the thumbtacks for a nearfall. MJF signaled for Wardlow and he walked toward ringside. Wardlow checked his pockets and acted like he could not find the Dynamite Diamond Ring. Punk pulled MJF with the chain and performed the Go to Sleep on MJF. Wardlow then pulled out the ring and placed it on the apron, turning face and departing from The Pinnacle. Punk grabbed the ring and hit MJF with it to win the match.

Afterward, Dr. Britt Baker D.M.D. (accompanied by Rebel and Jamie Hayter) defended the AEW Women's World Championship against Thunder Rosa. Baker came out with a new design of the title. Rosa performed a Tombstone Piledriver on Baker but the referee was distracted by Rebel. Hayter gave Baker the title and Baker then performed a Curb Stomp on Rosa on the title for a nearfall. Baker placed Rosa in the Lockjaw, but Rosa fought out of it and applied the Lockjaw on Baker, Baker tapped out but the referee was distracted by Rebel again. Rosa speared Rebel off the ring apron and clotheslined Hayter. Rosa went back into the ring and Baker performed another Curb Stomp to retain the title.

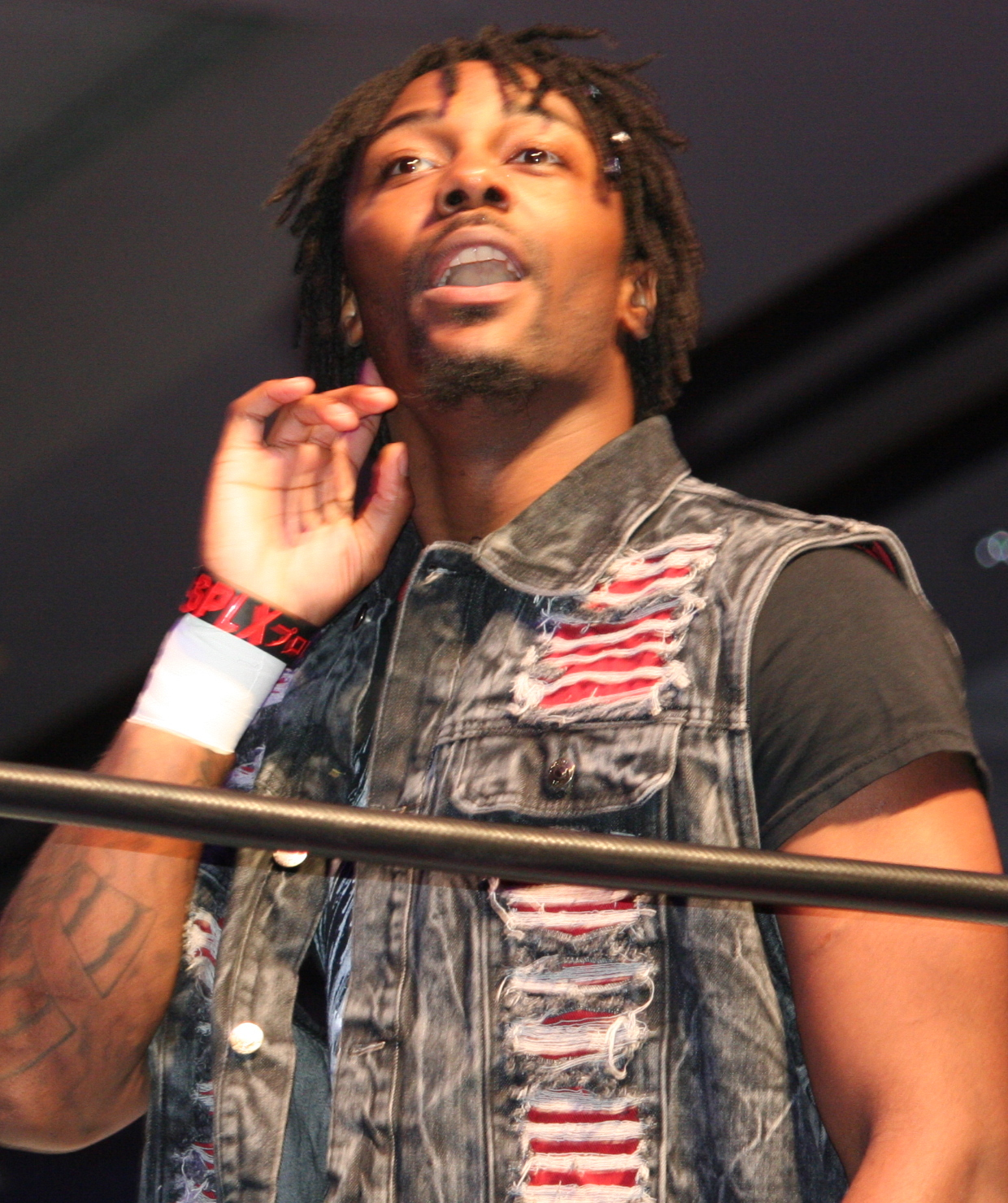
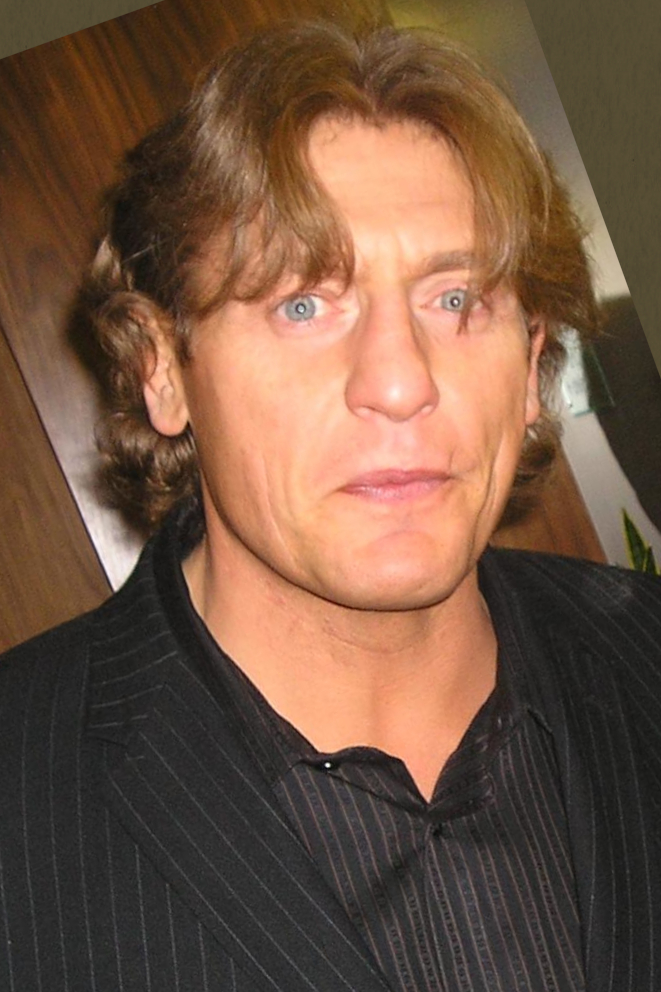
Both Swerve Strickland (left) and William Regal (right) made their AEW debuts at the event.

Next, Bryan Danielson faced Jon Moxley. Danielson blasted Moxley with a kick and applied a guillotine choke. Moxley escaped and threw Danielson out to ringside. Danielson came back into the ring and attempted a suicide dive, but Moxley caught Danielson and the two fought outside. Both men were bleeding when they were back in the ring, as Danielson performed a belly to back suplex on Moxley off the top rope for a nearfall. Danielson applied a dragon sleeper on Moxley, but Moxley placed his foot on the bottom rope to break the hold. In the closing moments, Danielson applied the triangle choke on Moxley, who countered and pinned Danielson to win the match while Danielson was holding onto the submission. Post-match, Danielson was furious about his loss, and kicked Moxley which led to a brawl. They were interrupted by former WWE NXT official William Regal, who made his unannounced AEW debut, and ordered Danielson and Moxley to shake hands. Danielson and Moxley listened and shook hands in front of Regal, leading to the formation of The Blackpool Combat Club.

In the penultimate match, Darby Allin, Sammy Guevara, and Sting faced The Andrade-Hardy Family Office (Andrade El Idolo, Matt Hardy, and Isiah Kassidy) in a six-man tornado tag team match. Guevara performed a Spanish Fly on Kassidy off the platform through multiple tables. Sting jumped off a balcony and hit a splash on Andrade through three tables. In the end, Allin performed a Scorpion Death Drop on Hardy onto a chair, and followed with a Coffin Drop to win the match.

=== Main event ===
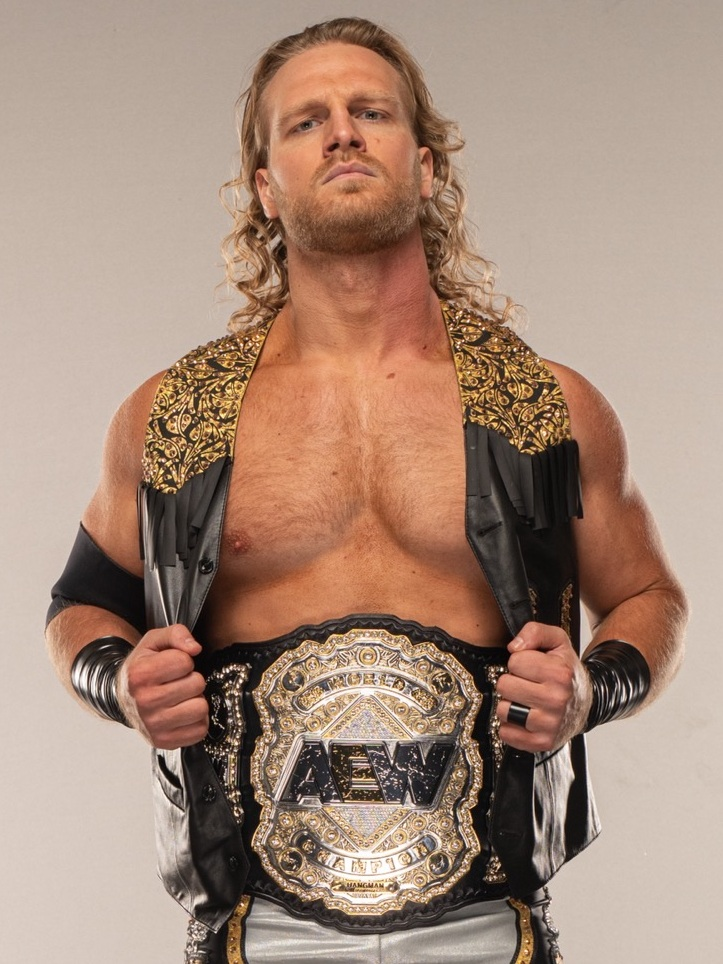
In the main event, reigning champion "Hangman" Adam Page defeated Adam Cole to retain the AEW World Championship.

In the main event, "Hangman" Adam Page defended the AEW World Championship against Adam Cole. During the match, Page attempted a moonsault on Cole, who countered into a superkick. Cole attempted another superkick, but Page countered into a Dead Eye. reDRagon (Bobby Fish and Kyle O'Reilly) came out and interfered, and Cole then performed a Panama Sunrise off the ring apron on Page. Back in the ring, Cole covered Page and scored a nearfall. reDRagon served another distraction, allowing Cole to hit a low blow. Then Cole performed a second Panama Sunrise and The Boom on Page for a nearfall. Page performed a Dead Eye on Cole off the ring apron through a table. In the final moments, Page performed a Buckshot Lariat on Cole, but Cole got his right hand on the bottom rope. Page tied Cole to the ropes and delivered multiple superkicks, Cole came back with a superkick and freed himself, but Page hit him with another superkick. Page performed The Boom on Cole and a second Buckshot Lariat to retain the championship.

== Reception ==
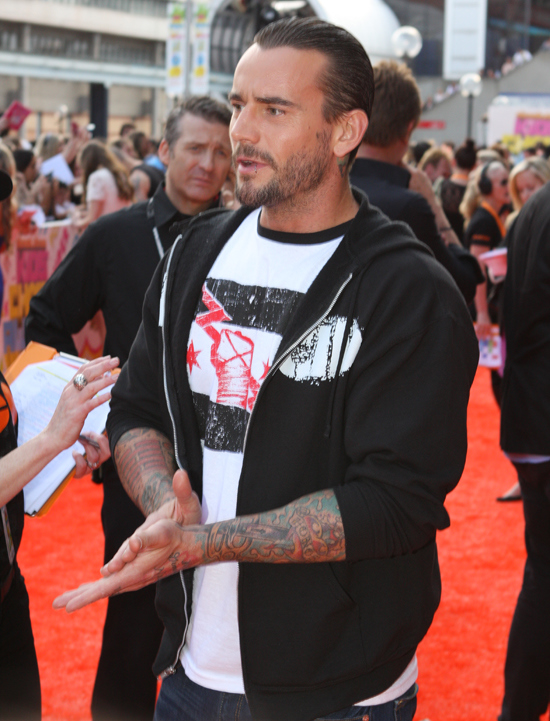
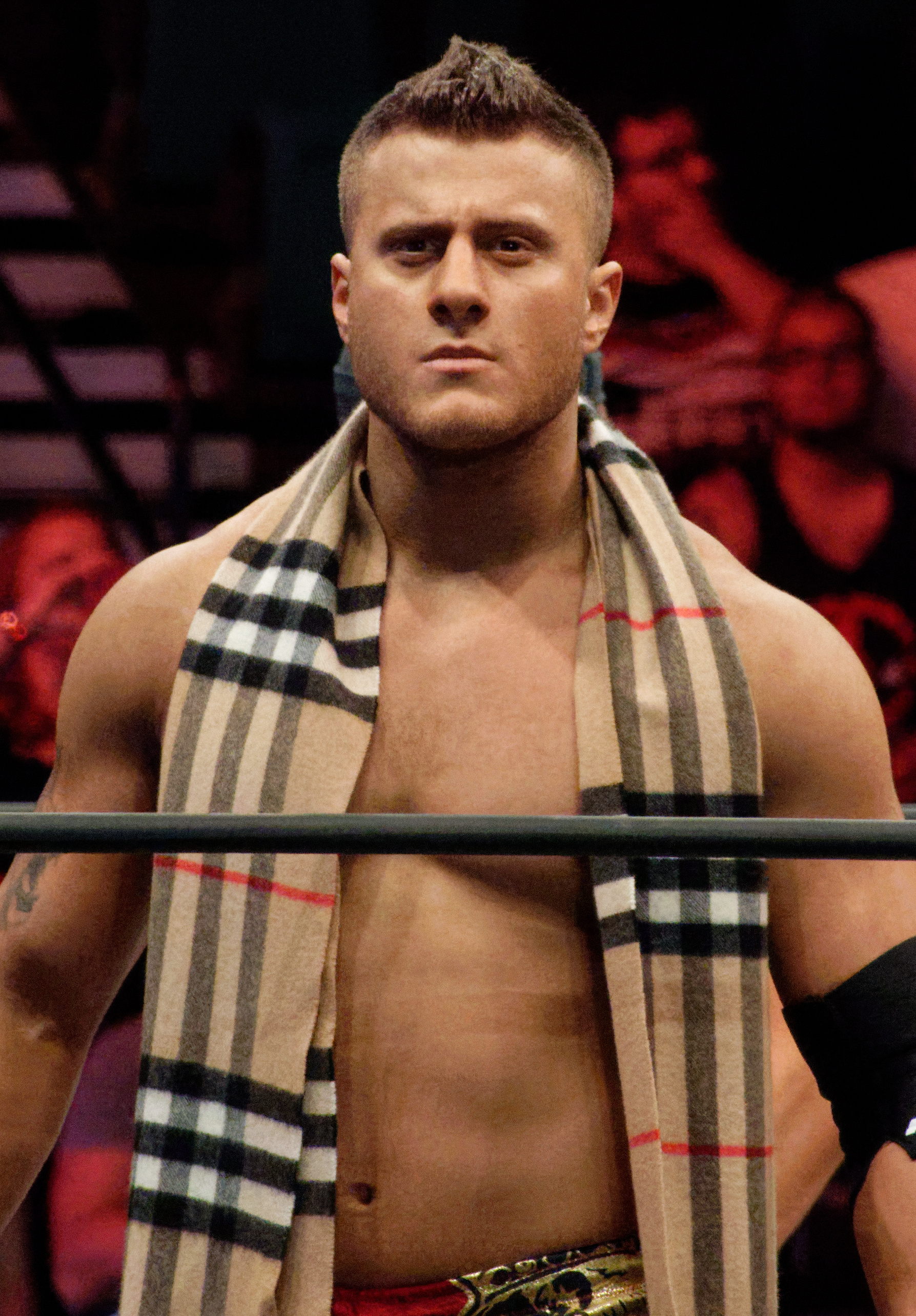
Critics gave high praise to the Dog Collar match between CM Punk and MJF (Punk at left and MJF at right).

Revolution received positive reviews from critics. For CBSSports.com, Brent Brookhouse wrote that the event was "near-perfect" and featured "something for everyone, from brutal grudge matches to thrilling championship clashes." Kingston-Jericho was a "brutal war" and the "best kind of wrestling", the tag team championship three-way between Jurassic Express, reDRagon and The Young Bucks was "a great spectacle", Cargill-Conti was "solid", Punk-MJF was "a near-perfect old-school dog collar match", Baker-Rosa never "really hit its stride" and was "quite disappointing", Moxley-Danielson was "pretty brutal" despite a "lackluster middle section", and the main event was "thrilling" and a "fun ride".

Justin Barrasso of Sports Illustrated opined that although Revolution "wasn't a perfect show", it was still "an outstanding night of pro wrestling". Barasso thought the main event match was "superb", the Punk-MJF match was a "masterpiece", Moxley-Danielson was "physical" and "grisly", and Kingston-Jericho was "fantastic". He was however disappointed by the women's championship match between Britt Baker and Thunder Rosa which he felt "ran too long" and suffered from an "abundance of interference".

Professional wrestling journalist Bryan Alvarez wrote that the event was "wonderfully varied" and featured five matches that could be plausibly considered the best of the night, with those being Kingston-Jericho, the three-way tag championship match, Punk-MJF, Moxley-Danielson and Page-Cole.

Combat sports journalist Dave Meltzer assigned star ratings to the event, with Kingston-Jericho, the three-way tag match, Punk-MJF and Moxley-Danielson all receiving a rating of 4 3/4 stars out of 5. Elsewhere on the card, the main event received 4 1/2 stars, the pre-show six-man tag team was assigned 4 1/4 stars, and the six-man tornado tag match received 4 stars. The lowest rated match on the show was Cargill-Conti, which was given 2 1/4 stars.

== Aftermath ==
Orange Cassidy suffered an arm injury during the Face of the Revolution ladder match after he was thrown out of the ring by Keith Lee.

== Results ==
No.	Results	Stipulations	Times
1^{P}	Leyla Hirsch defeated Kris Statlander by pinfall	Singles match	9:50
2^{P}	Hook defeated Q. T. Marshall by submission	Singles match	5:00
3^{P}	The House of Black (Malakai Black, Brody King, and Buddy Matthews) defeated Pac, Penta Oscuro, and Erick Redbeard (with Alex Abrahantes) by pinfall	Six-man tag team match	17:20
4	Eddie Kingston defeated Chris Jericho by submission	Singles match	13:40
5	Jurassic Express (Jungle Boy and Luchasaurus) (c) defeated reDRagon (Bobby Fish and Kyle O'Reilly) and The Young Bucks (Matt Jackson and Nick Jackson) (with Brandon Cutler) by pinfall	Three-way tag team match for the AEW World Tag Team Championship	18:55
6	Wardlow defeated Christian Cage, Keith Lee, Orange Cassidy, Powerhouse Hobbs, and Ricky Starks	Face of the Revolution Ladder match for a future AEW TNT Championship match	17:20
7	Jade Cargill (c) (with Mark Sterling) defeated Tay Conti (with Anna Jay) by pinfall	Singles match for the AEW TBS Championship	6:50
8	CM Punk defeated MJF by pinfall	Dog Collar match	26:45
9	Dr. Britt Baker, D.M.D. (c) (with Jamie Hayter and Rebel) defeated Thunder Rosa by pinfall	Singles match for the AEW Women's World Championship	17:25
10	Jon Moxley defeated Bryan Danielson by pinfall	Singles match	21:05
11	Darby Allin, Sammy Guevara, and Sting defeated The Andrade-Hardy Family Office (Andrade El Ídolo, Matt Hardy, and Isiah Kassidy) (with José the Assistant) by pinfall	Six-man tornado tag team match	13:20
12	"Hangman" Adam Page (c) defeated Adam Cole by pinfall	Singles match for the AEW World Championship	25:45
(c) / – the champion(s) heading into the match; P / – the match was broadcast on the pre-show

== See also ==
- 2022 in professional wrestling
- List of All Elite Wrestling pay-per-view events
