= House of Black =

Professional wrestling stable

- The stable's logo as House of Black

Tag team
- Members: Brody King; Buddy Matthews
- Name(s): Kings of the Black Throne; Hounds of Hell; House of Black
- Former members: Malakai Black (leader); Julia Hart
- Debut: August 1, 2021
- Years active: 2021–present

The Hounds of Hell is a professional wrestling tag team consisting of Brody King and Buddy Matthews. They are signed to All Elite Wrestling (AEW), but the tag team is currently on hiatus due to Matthews suffering an ankle injury.

The group ultimately started in PWG at Mystery Vortex 7 in 2021, where Malaki Black and King formed a tag team called Kings of the Black Throne. They would win the promotion's World Tag Team Championship later that year. King joined AEW in 2022, where Black was already competing, thus bringing the Kings of the Black Throne to AEW and starting the formation of the House of Black. Their motto was "The House Always Wins." In January 2025, Black left the group and it was renamed to the "Hounds of Hell".

== History ==
=== Pro Wrestling Guerrilla (2021) ===
Malakai Black made his surprise return to Pro Wrestling Guerrilla (PWG) at Mystery Vortex 7, the promotion's first event since 2019, on August 1, 2021, by aiding Brody King in rescuing the PWG World Champion Bandido from an assault by Super Dragon, Black Taurus and Demonic Flamita. Black announced that he would be back the following month and King said that he would follow Black where he would go, thus forming a tag team called Kings of the Black Throne. At Threemendous VI, Kings of the Black Throne defeated Taurus and Flamita to win the vacant World Tag Team Championship.

=== All Elite Wrestling (2022–present) ===
==== House of Black (2022–2024) ====
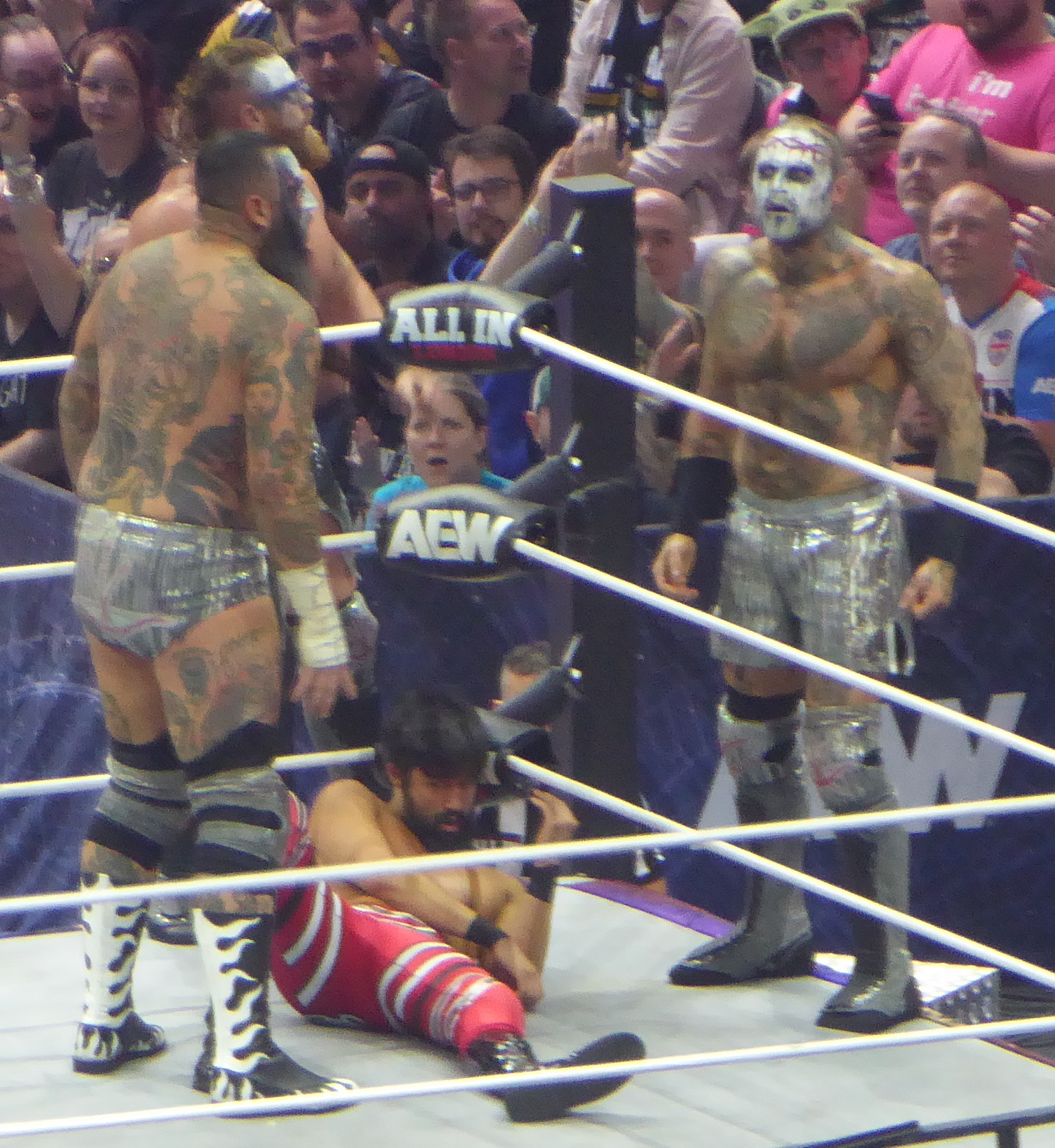
House of Black - from right to left: Malakai Black, Brody King, and Buddy Matthews – menacing Wheeler Yuta (bottom) at All In in August 2024.

Malakai Black made his All Elite Wrestling debut on the 7 July 2021 episode of Dynamite, attacking Arn Anderson and Cody Rhodes with the Black Mass. In early 2022, Black began a feud with The Varsity Blonds (Brian Pillman Jr. and Griff Garrison) and Death Triangle (Pac and Penta El Zero Miedo). On the January 12, 2022 episode of Dynamite, Brody King made his AEW debut, thus continuing their team "Kings of the Black Throne" and subsequently forming the stable the House of Black. On the 23 February 2022 edition of Dynamite, Buddy Matthews made his debut as the third man for the "House of Black". The trio would defeat Death Triangle and Erick Redbeard at the Revolution buy-in show.

On the December 8, 2021 edition of Dynamite, Black spat black mist in the eyes of Julia Hart, causing her to later resort to wearing an eye patch, and showing signs of opposition to The Varsity Blondes. At Double Or Nothing, The House of Black faced Death Triangle. During the match, Hart sprayed PAC with black mist and officially joined the stable.

At AEW x NJPW: Forbidden Door on June 26, Black was involved in a four-way match in which he sprayed Miro with black mist, beginning a feud. Brody King had also begun feuding with Darby Allin, with King losing a Coffin match against Allin on 10 August. This culminated in a six-man tag team match at All Out on September 4 where Darby Allin, Sting, and Miro defeated House of Black.

At Revolution on March 5, 2023, the House of Black won the AEW World Trios Championship from The Elite. They lost the titles to The Acclaimed and Billy Gunn at All In in August 2023. At Full Gear on November 18, 2023, Julia Hart won the AEW TBS Championship - her first title in AEW after she defeated Skye Blue and former TBS Champion Kris Statlander in a three-way match. At Dynasty, Julia Hart lost the AEW TBS Championship to Willow Nightingale. Between November and December, King participated in the inaugural Continental Classic, where he finished with 6 points in his block, but failed to advance to the semi-finals.

On the June 15, 2024 episode of AEW Collision, the House of Black won a #1 contenders' match for The Patriarchy's AEW World Trios Championships. After the match, Patriarchy leader Christian Cage appeared on the titantron and revealed that they had attacked Matthews with a con-chair-to, turning the entire House of Black stable face for the first time. On August 25 at All In, the House of Black participated in the ladder match for the AEW World Trios Championships, but failed to win. On November 23 at Full Gear, Kings of the Black Throne participated in a four-way tag team match for the AEW World Tag Team Championships, but failed to win Between November and December, King participated in the 2024 Continental Classic, where he finished with 6 points, but failed to advance to the semi-finals.

==== Hounds of Hell (2025–present) ====
On the January 22, 2025 episode of Dynamite, Malakai Black was silently removed from the group as his deal with AEW expired shortly afterwards. On the January 25 Homecoming special episode of Collision, the group was renamed to the "Hounds of Hell". In February 2025, the tag team of King and Matthews would go on hiatus due to Matthews suffering an ankle injury, leaving King as a singles wrestler. In the same month, King formed a tag team with Bandido, known as "Brodido" and Hart would leave to form her own stable, known as "Triangle of Madness".

== House Rules match ==
As part of their tenure as the House of Black, select matches involving the stable, such as title matches, are contested under "House Rules"; in May 2023, Matthews specified that a House Rules match would have no rope breaks, enforced disqualifications, and 20 second count outs. As a concession, the House of Black allows their opponent to choose an additional stipulation; for example, at All In in 2023, The Acclaimed's stipulation for their Trios Championship match against the House was that it was conducted under No Holds Barred rules.

== Championships and accomplishments ==
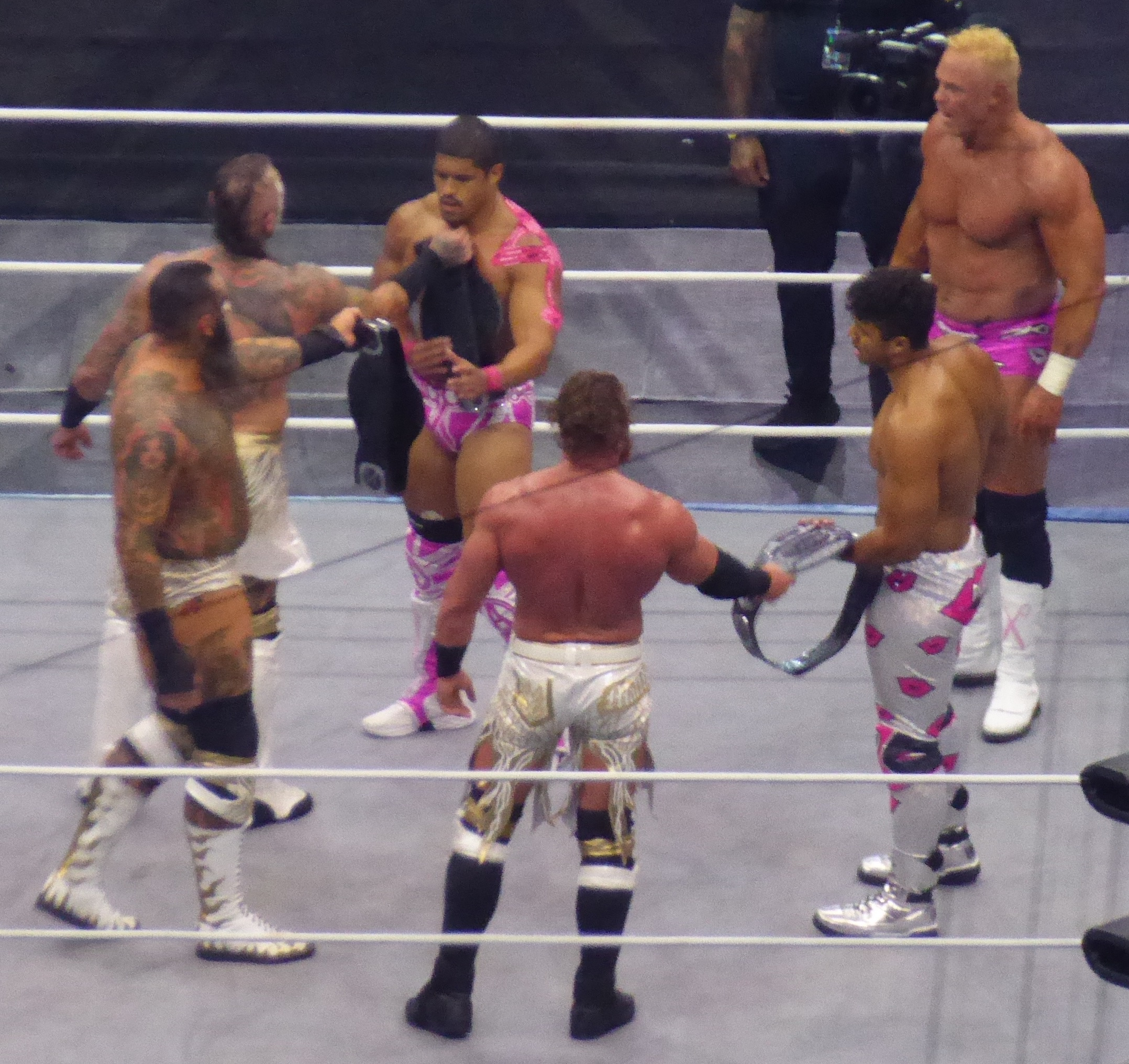
The House of Black (left) surrendering the AEW World Trios Championship to The Acclaimed and Billy Gunn at All In in August 2023.

- All Elite Wrestling
  - AEW World Trios Championship (1 time) – Black, King, and Matthews
  - AEW TBS Championship (1 time) – Hart
  - Royal Rampage (2022) – King
- Melbourne City Wrestling
  - MCW World Heavyweight Championship (1 time) – Matthews
- New York Post
  - Female Breakout Wrestler of the year (2023) – Hart
- Pro Wrestling Guerrilla
  - PWG World Tag Team Championship (1 time, final) – Black and King
- Pro Wrestling Illustrated
  - Ranked No. 105 of the top 250 women's wrestlers in the PWI Women's 250 in 2023 – Hart
- Wrestling Observer Newsletter
  - Most Improved (2023) – Hart
