= Stephon Smith =

American professional wrestling referee

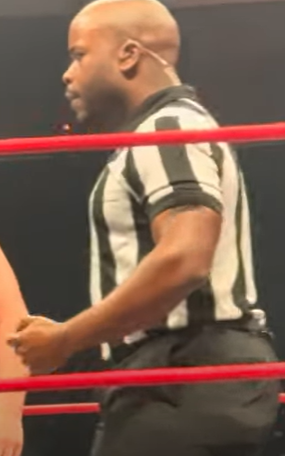
- Stephon Smith in 2023

Personal information
- Born: September 21, 1989 (age 37) Baltimore, Maryland

Professional wrestling career
- Ring name(s): Stephon Smith; Stephon J. Baxter III; Rump Thump; Hokus
- Debut: 2007

Stephon Smith (born September 21, 1989) is an American professional wrestling referee, and former professional wrestler signed to All Elite Wrestling (AEW), and has previously worked for the National Wrestling Alliance, Ring of Honor, Ohio Valley Wrestling, and WWE.

== Career ==
Smith began his career in 2007 on the independent circuit. He had a short professional wrestling career under the ring name Rump Thump, notably holding the OVW Television Championship.

Smith signed with WWE in October 2019 and began refereeing on NXT. He was released on August 6, 2021, and did limited work for Game Changer Wrestling and New Japan Pro Wrestling, before joining All Elite Wrestling in February 2022. He made his AEW pay-per-view debut at Revolution.
