= Full Gear (2019) =

All Elite Wrestling pay-per-view event

- Promotional poster featuring Chris Jericho, Cody, Jon Moxley, and Kenny Omega
- Promotion: All Elite Wrestling
- Date: November 9, 2019
- City: Baltimore, Maryland
- Venue: Royal Farms Arena
- Attendance: 8,500
- Buy rate: 100,000

Pay-per-view chronology
← Previous; All Out	Next → Revolution

Full Gear chronology
← Previous; First	Next → 2020

The 2019 Full Gear was the inaugural Full Gear professional wrestling pay-per-view (PPV) event produced by All Elite Wrestling (AEW). It took place on November 9, 2019, at the Royal Farms Arena in Baltimore, Maryland. The name of the event was a reference to a Being The Elite segment that was also titled "Full Gear." The event aired through traditional PPV outlets, as well as on B/R Live in North America and FITE TV internationally. This event became the first non-WWE pay-per-view held at this venue since The Great American Bash in 2000 in what was then Baltimore Arena.

Eight matches were contested at the event, including one on The Buy In pre-show. In the main event, Jon Moxley defeated Kenny Omega in an unsanctioned Lights Out match. In other prominent matches, Chris Jericho retained the AEW World Championship against Cody after Cody's cornerman MJF threw in the towel, thereby preventing Cody from ever challenging for the title again as long as he is a member of AEW, Riho retained the AEW Women's World Championship against Emi Sakura, and SoCal Uncensored (Frankie Kazarian and Scorpio Sky) defeated Lucha Brothers (Pentagon Jr. and Rey Fenix) and Private Party (Isiah Kassidy and Marq Quen) in a three-way tag team match to retain the AEW World Tag Team Championship.

== Production ==
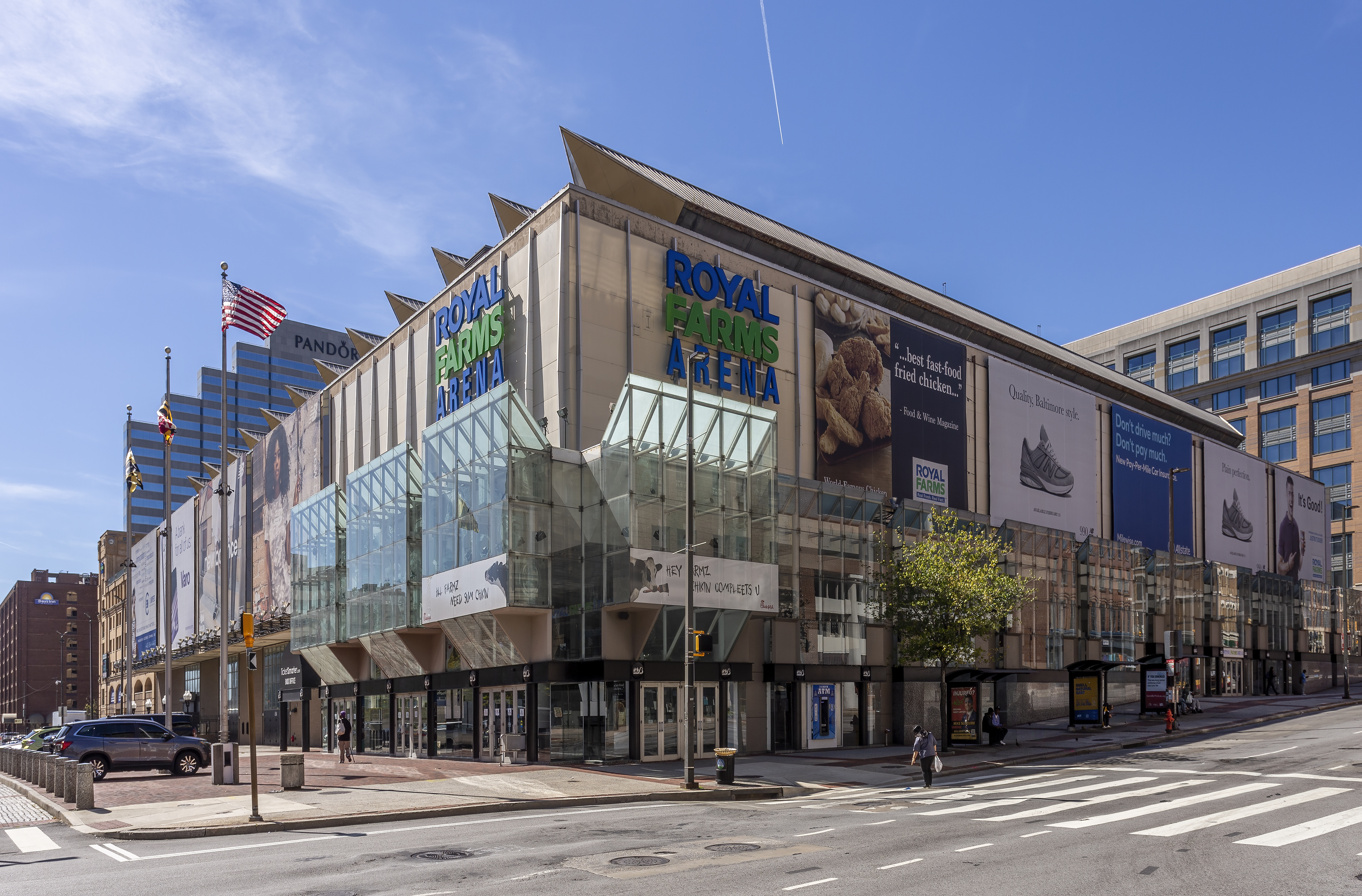
The inaugural Full Gear took place at the Royal Farms Arena in Baltimore, Maryland in what was the first non-WWE event held at the arena in 19 years.

=== Background ===
During All Out on August 31, 2019, the American professional wrestling promotion All Elite Wrestling (AEW) announced that their next pay-per-view (PPV) event would be held on Saturday, November 9 at the Royal Farms Arena in Baltimore, Maryland and would be titled Full Gear. The name of the event was a reference to a Being The Elite segment titled "Full Gear" with AEW wrestler "Hangman" Adam Page, a segment in which Page was always in his full ring gear. "Nowhere to Run" by AEW wrestler Chris Jericho's band Fozzy was the official theme song for the event. Full Gear was also the first non-WWE pay-per-view event at this arena since the now-defunct World Championship Wrestling (WCW) produced The Great American Bash in 2000 in what was then the Baltimore Arena.

=== Storylines ===
Full Gear featured professional wrestling matches that involved different wrestlers from pre-existing scripted feuds and storylines. Storylines were produced on AEW's weekly television program, Dynamite, the supplementary online streaming show, Dark, and The Young Bucks' YouTube series Being The Elite.

At the conclusion of Double or Nothing, Jon Moxley appeared from the crowd and attacked both Chris Jericho and Kenny Omega. The latter fought back and brawled on the entrance stage where Moxley put Omega through the stage with a standing fireman's carry takeover. A match between Omega and Moxley was then scheduled for All Out, however, the match was canceled due to Moxley suffering an elbow injury. On September 4, their match was rescheduled for Full Gear. On the October 9 episode of Dynamite, at the end of Moxley's match against Shawn Spears, Omega arrived on the entrance ramp with a broom and a baseball bat, both wrapped in barbed wire. Omega threw the bat towards Moxley, but Pac blindsided Omega with a steel chair. Unwilling to attack an unconscious Omega and wanting a fair fight, Moxley dropped the bat and walked backstage. On the October 30 episode of Dynamite, it was announced that Moxley and Omega's match would be an unsanctioned lights out match.

At All Out, Chris Jericho defeated Adam Page to become the inaugural AEW World Champion, while on the undercard, Cody defeated Shawn Spears to improve his singles match win–loss–draw record to 2–0–1. Due to Cody's singles match record, he was granted an AEW World Championship match against Jericho at Full Gear. On October 29, AEW announced that the match would include a panel of ringside judges that would decide the winner in the case of a time limit draw. On the November 6 episode of Dynamite, Cody proclaimed that if he did not win at Full Gear, he would never challenge for the championship again.

At All Out, Santana and Ortiz debuted for AEW and attacked The Young Bucks (Matt Jackson and Nick Jackson) following the latter's match. During the debut episode of Dynamite on October 2, Santana and Ortiz teamed with Chris Jericho and defeated The Elite (Kenny Omega and The Young Bucks). Santana and Ortiz would go on and join Jericho's faction The Inner Circle and challenged The Young Bucks to a match at Full Gear that the Bucks accepted.

At Double or Nothing, Adam Page was scheduled to face Pac, but due to creative differences with Dragon Gate, a promotion that Pac also wrestled for and was the reigning champion, their match was canceled. After settling those creative differences, Pac had his AEW debut match at All Out, defeating Kenny Omega by making him pass out to the Brutalizer. Following the show during Page's post-event interview, he was interrupted by Pac, who said that he had returned to AEW to get revenge on Page. A match between the two was then scheduled for the debut episode of Dynamite on October 2, which Pac won. Page then teamed with Omega and defeated the team of Pac and Jon Moxley on the October 16 episode. Another match between Page and Pac was scheduled for Full Gear.

On the October 30 episode of Dynamite, SoCal Uncensored (Frankie Kazarian and Scorpio Sky) defeated The Lucha Brothers (Pentagon Jr. and Rey Fenix) to win the inaugural AEW World Tag Team Championship. The following week, SCU were scheduled to defend the championship at Full Gear in a three-way match against The Lucha Brothers and the winners of the match between The Dark Order (Evil Uno and Stu Grayson) and Private Party (Isiah Kassidy and Marq Quen), which Private Party won.

On November 6, it was announced that Riho would defend the AEW Women's World Championship against her former trainer, Emi Sakura, at Full Gear. That same night on Dynamite, Sakura teamed with Jamie Hayter and defeated Riho and Shanna with Sakura pinning Riho.

On November 7 during AEW Countdown: Full Gear, it was announced that Joey Janela would be facing Shawn Spears at the event.

During the tag team match pitting Bea Priestley and Shoko Nakajima against Dr. Britt Baker, D.M.D. and Riho on Fight for the Fallen's Buy In pre-show, Priestley kicked Baker in the back of the head, giving her a concussion. During All Out's Buy In pre-show, Baker eliminated Priestley from the Casino Battle Royale to determine one of the two challengers for the inaugural AEW Women's World Championship, but Priestley in turn aided in the elimination of Baker, allowing Nyla Rose to win. On November 5 during Dark, a match between Baker and Priestley was scheduled for the Full Gear Buy In pre-show.

== Event ==
Other on-screen personnel
Role	Name
Commentators	Jim Ross (PPV)
Commentators	Excalibur (Pre-show + PPV)
Commentators	Goldenboy (Pre-show)
Commentators	Taz (Pre-show)
Spanish commentators	Alex Abrahantes
Spanish commentators	Dasha Gonzalez
German commentators	Günter Zapf
German commentators	Mike Ritter
Ring announcer	Justin Roberts
Referees	Aubrey Edwards
Referees	Bryce Remsburg
Referees	Earl Hebner
Referees	Paul Turner
Referees	Rick Knox
AEW World Championship match judges	Dean Malenko
AEW World Championship match judges	Arn Anderson
AEW World Championship match judges	The Great Muta

=== The Buy In ===
During The Buy In pre-show, Dr. Britt Baker, D.M.D. faced Bea Priestley. In the end, Baker forced Priestley to submit to the "Lockjaw" to win.

=== Preliminary matches ===
The pay-per-view opened with Proud and Powerful (Santana and Ortiz) facing The Young Bucks (Matt Jackson and Nick Jackson). The Rock 'n' Roll Express (Ricky Morton and Robert Gibson) sat in the crowd, and were greeted by The Young Bucks during their entrance. Santana and Ortiz performed the "Street Sweeper" on Nick to win. Afterwards, Proud and Powerful continued to attack The Young Bucks. Morton and Gibson jumped the barricade to assist the Bucks. Morton performed a "Front Flip Piledriver" on Santana and then a "Suicide Dive" on Ortiz and Sammy Guevara.

The second match pitted "Hangman" Adam Page against Pac. Page performed a "Dead Eye" on Pac to win.

Next, Shawn Spears (accompanied by Tully Blanchard) competed against Joey Janela. In the end, Spears and Blanchard performed an assisted spike piledriver on Janela on the outside of the ring. Spears then executed a "Death Valley Driver" on Janela to win.

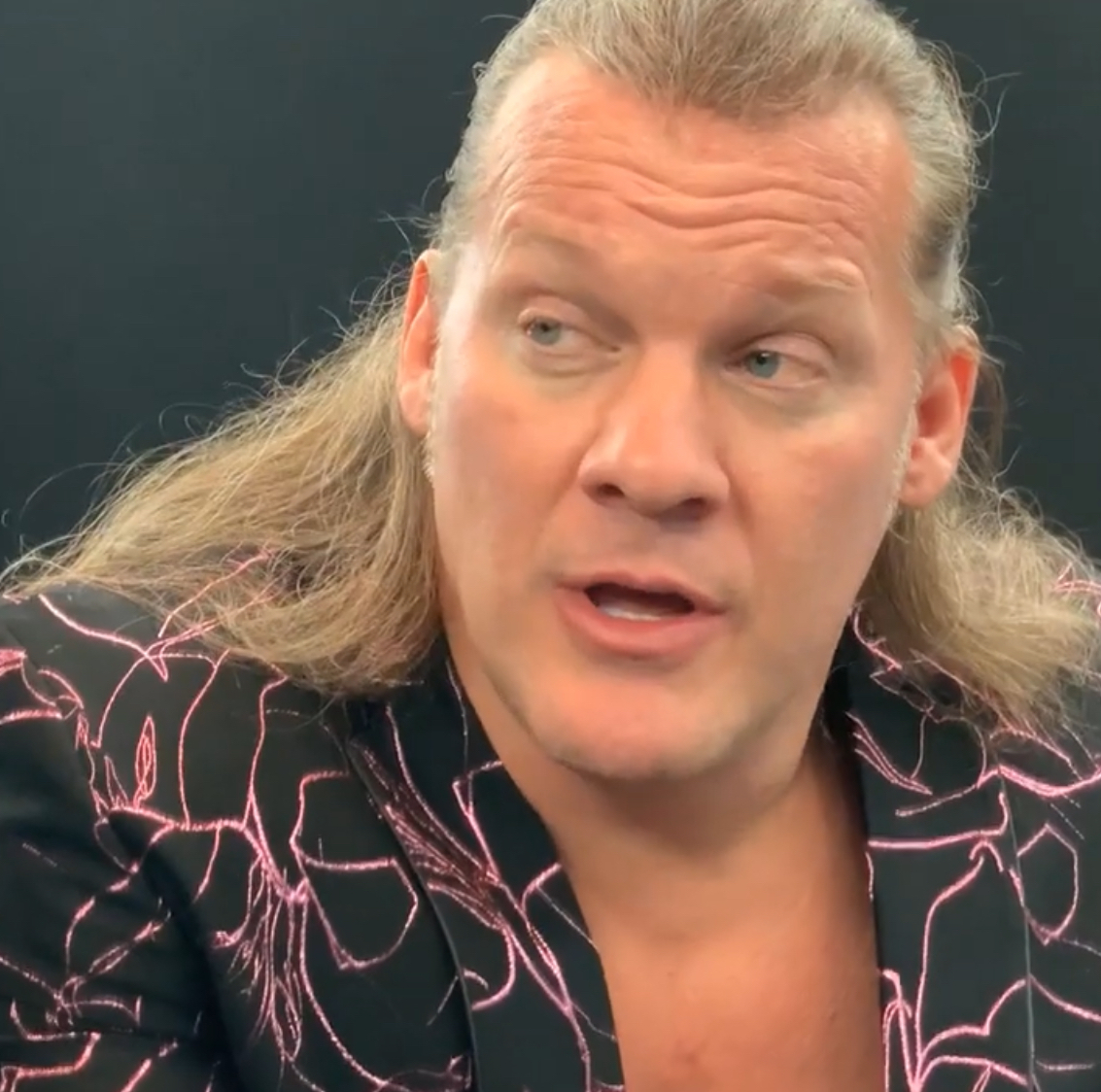
In the penultimate match, Chris Jericho defeated Cody to retain the AEW World Championship.

Afterwards, SoCal Uncensored's Frankie Kazarian and Scorpio Sky defended the AEW World Tag Team Championship against The Lucha Brothers (Pentagón Jr. and Rey Fenix) and Private Party (Isiah Kassidy and Marq Quen) in a three-way tag team match. Sky and Kazarian performed an "SCU Later" on Kassidy for the win. After the match, SCU stablemate Christopher Daniels returned from injury and saved Sky and Kazarian from the Lucha Bros, attacking Pentagón Jr and Fenix.

In the next match, Riho defended the AEW Women's World Championship against Emi Sakura. Riho hit Sakura with a double knee strike before rolling her up to retain the championship.

=== Main event ===
In the penultimate match, Chris Jericho (accompanied by Jake Hager) defended the AEW World Championship against Cody (accompanied by MJF). Arn Anderson, Dean Malenko, and The Great Muta were introduced as the judges to determine the winner in the event of a time limit draw. Cody attempted a "Suicide Dive" but Jericho avoided it, resulting in Cody landing head-first, busting his head open on the entrance ramp. Hager struck Cody and was ejected from the match. Jericho struck Cody with the AEW championship belt for a near-fall. Cody performed "Cross Rhodes" on Jericho for a near-fall. In the end, Jericho applied the "Liontamer", and MJF threw in the towel, meaning Jericho retained the title. As per the stipulation, Cody can never challenge for the AEW World Championship again as long as he is a member of AEW. After the match, MJF initially consoled Cody before attacking him with a low blow and leaving to loud boos from the audience.

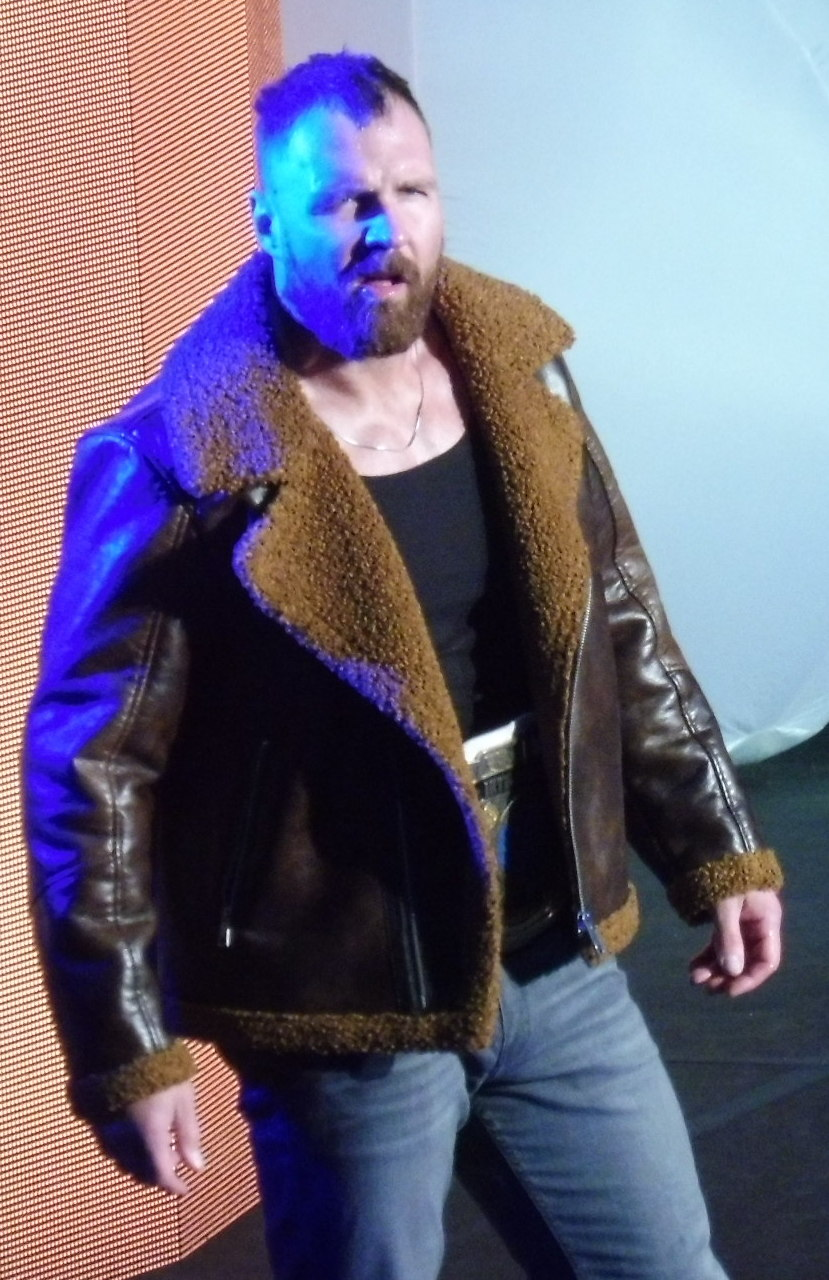
Jon Moxley defeated Kenny Omega in a non-sanctioned match Lights Out in the event's final match.

=== Lights Out match ===
In the final match of the night, Jon Moxley faced Kenny Omega in an unsanctioned Lights Out match, a match not officially recognized by AEW. Throughout the duration of the match, several weapons were used, including glass, anchor chains, trash cans, a screwdriver, a barbed wire bat, and a barbed wire broom. Late in the contest, Adam Page and The Young Bucks appeared and delivered a platform of barbed wire for Omega to use. The plan backfired, however, as Moxley performed a suplex on Omega onto the structure. Omega performed a "V-Trigger" on Moxley through a glass display by the entrance. Moxley performed a "Snap Double Underhook DDT" on Omega for a near-fall. Moxley pulled back the ring mat, exposing the wooden boards beneath. Omega performed a "Snap Double Underhook DDT" on Moxley onto the exposed boards for a near-fall. Omega attempted a "Phoenix Splash", but Moxley avoided and performed a "Paradigm Shift" on Omega on the boards to win.

== Reception ==
The event received generally positive reviews. Jason Powell of Pro Wrestling Dot Net "enjoyed the show"; it was "refreshing to see an event filled with matches that all felt like they mattered and weren't just filling time." He also stated that "the crowd was hot and everyone went above and beyond in the ring." Writing for CBSSports.com, Brent Brookhouse and Jack Crosby also liked the show, commenting that "the final two matches of the night brought a unique approach that only AEW can truly deliver with a lack of the restrictions imposed on WWE efforts and the elite level talents on the All Elite Wrestling roster." The Moxley-Omega main event and the Jericho-Cody world championship match were the two highest rated matches of the show, with both getting an "A−" grade. Elsewhere on the show, the Riho-Sakura women's title match was rated "B+" and the SoCal Uncensored-Lucha Brothers-Private Party three-way tag match for the tag team titles was rated "B−".

Despite the show being met with mostly positive reviews, the unsanctioned Lights Out match between Jon Moxley and Kenny Omega garnered divided reactions due to its graphic violence and heavy use of weapons. Arya Witner of the Wrestling Observer Newsletter called the match "disgusting" and if she never sees "another AEW Lights Out match [again], it will be too soon." On the contrary, Dave Meltzer of the same publication acknowledged that although he personally "hated" the match's violence, from a "mental aspect of laying out a match and the physical aspect of doing it at a high level" that "it was a tremendous match and an incredible spectacle". He would give the match a 4 1/2 star rating. AEW commentator Jim Ross claimed that the "passion in that match was a breath of fresh air for our business."

AEW President and CEO Tony Khan responded to the negative reactions to the Jon Moxley vs Kenny Omega unsanctioned Lights Out match, stating:

I expected it and that's why we put it on PPV. We would never do anything like this on TV. Our friends at TNT know what we're trying to do in putting hardcore matches in the main events of PPVs. There's gonna be two wrestlers that wanna settle it so we're not gonna sanction it. We're gonna turn the lights off and turn a blind eye to it and not be liable for what occurs in the ring. I think it's a very logical thing and I'm not surprised that people are shocked. I think most people did love it. It got a huge amount of interest and it did exactly what we wanted it to do which was start a conversation. To me, I absolutely loved it.

== Aftermath ==
On the November 13 episode of Dynamite, MJF called Cody a liar and a sociopath and if he had not prevented Cody from winning, his career would have been over. Cody came to the ring but was attacked by the debuting Wardlow, revealed to be MJF's bodyguard, confirmed he had signed with AEW. Seemingly refusing to face Cody in a match, Cody asked MJF to name his price. MJF laid out three conditions to be met by Cody in order for a match between them to happen at Revolution: he could not touch MJF until the match, he would have to defeat Wardlow in a steel cage match, and he would have to take ten lashes with a leather belt on live TV. Cody agreed to all the stipulations. On the February 5, 2020 episode, Cody took the ten lashes from MJF, including one from Wardlow. On the February 19 episode, Cody was successful in defeating Wardlow in AEW's first-ever steel cage match, but was defeated by MJF at Revolution on February 29.

After an investigation in November 2019, AEW was fined $10,000 by the Maryland Athletic State Commission in May 2020 for the unsanctioned match between Moxley and Omega, due to the fact that intentional bleeding is disallowed during professional wrestling matches contested in Maryland.

In November 2020, AEW President and CEO Tony Khan referred to Full Gear as being one of AEW's "Big Four" PPVs, which includes Double or Nothing, All Out, and Revolution, their four biggest domestic shows produced quarterly. The inaugural Full Gear was the third of these shows produced.

== Results ==
No.	Results	Stipulations	Times
1^{P}	Dr. Britt Baker, D.M.D. defeated Bea Priestley	Singles match	11:35
2	Proud and Powerful (Santana and Ortiz) defeated The Young Bucks (Matt Jackson and Nick Jackson)	Tag team match	21:00
3	"Hangman" Adam Page defeated Pac	Singles match	18:30
4	Shawn Spears (with Tully Blanchard) defeated Joey Janela	Singles match	11:45
5	SoCal Uncensored (Frankie Kazarian and Scorpio Sky) (c) defeated Lucha Brothers (Pentagón Jr. and Rey Fénix) and Private Party (Isiah Kassidy and Marq Quen)	Three-Way match for the AEW World Tag Team Championship	13:01
6	Riho (c) defeated Emi Sakura	Singles match for the AEW Women's World Championship	13:25
7	Chris Jericho (c) (with Jake Hager) defeated Cody (with MJF)	Last Chance Singles match for the AEW World Championship; Since Cody lost, he could never challenge for the AEW World Championship again as long as he was a member of the AEW roster.	29:35
8	Jon Moxley defeated Kenny Omega	Unsanctioned Lights Out match	38:45
(c) / – the champion(s) heading into the match; P / – the match was broadcast on the pre-show

== See also ==
- 2019 in professional wrestling
- List of All Elite Wrestling pay-per-view events
