= List of AEW World Tag Team Champions =

Professional wrestling tag team champions

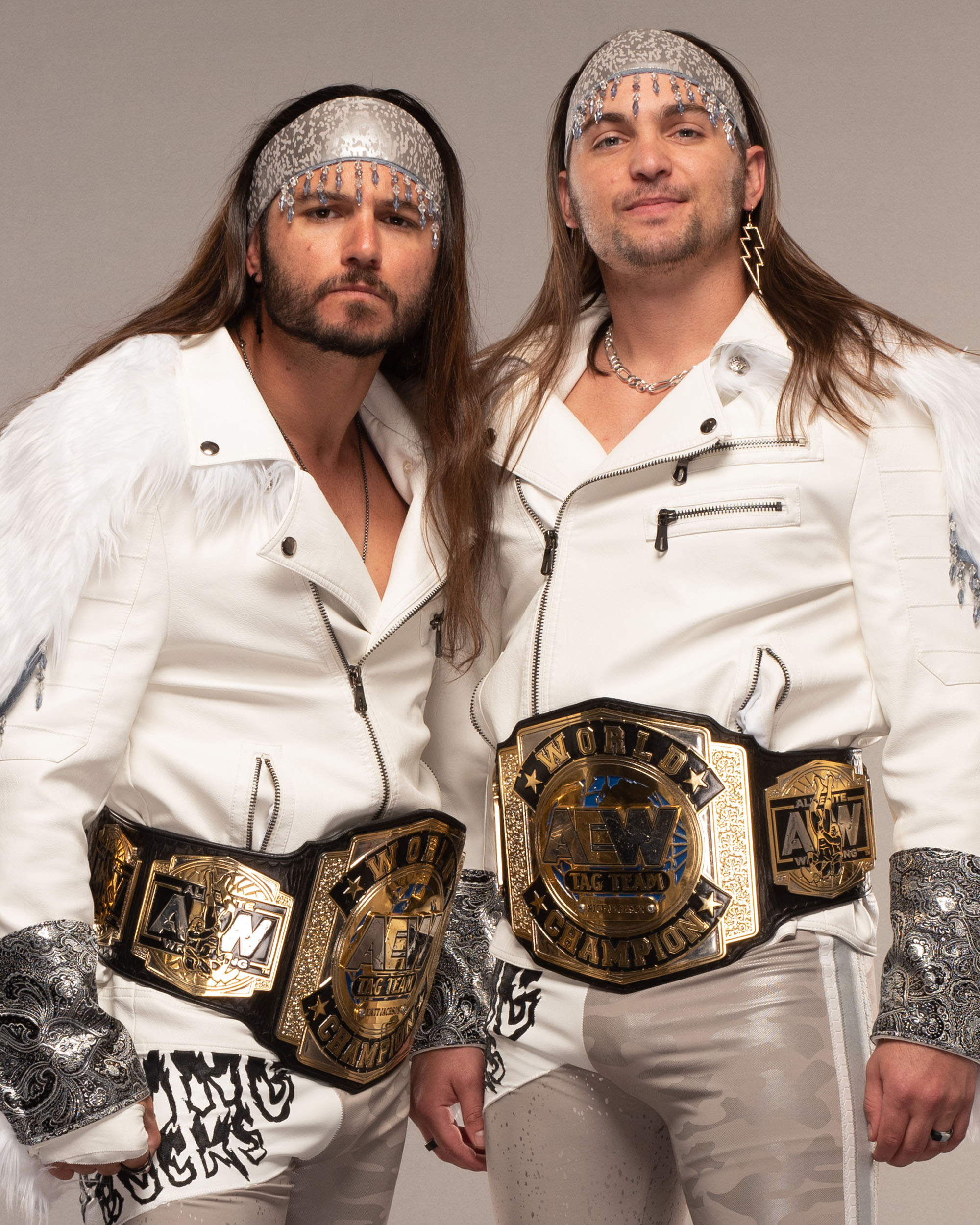
Current and record four-time champions The Young Bucks

The AEW World Tag Team Championship is a men's professional wrestling world tag team championship created and promoted by All Elite Wrestling (AEW). It is a standard tag team championship, being contested by teams of two wrestlers. Established on October 30, 2019, the inaugural champions were SoCal Uncensored (Frankie Kazarian and Scorpio Sky).

As of November 22, 2026, there have been 20 reigns between 15 teams composed of 30 individual champions and one vacancy. The Young Bucks (Matt Jackson and Nick Jackson) have the most reigns at four, both as a team and individually. The Young Bucks are also the longest reigning champions for their first reign, which lasted 302 days, and they have the longest combined reign at 522 days. Darby Allin and Sting have the shortest reign at 25 days as they vacated the title due to Sting's retirement. Sting is also the oldest champion at 64 while Jungle Boy is the youngest at 24.

The Young Bucks (Matt Jackson and Nick Jackson) are the current champions in their fourth reign, both as a team and individually. They won the title by defeating Cage and Cope (Christian Cage and Adam Copeland) and FTR (Dax Harwood and Cash Wheeler) in a Three-way ladder match at All Out on September 26, 2026, in Hoffman Estates, Illinois.

== Title history ==
Key
| No. | Overall reign number |
| Reign | Reign number for the specific team—reign numbers for the individuals are in parentheses, if different |
| Days | Number of days held |
| + | Current reign is changing daily |

| No. | Champion | Championship change | | | Reign statistics | | Notes | Ref. |
| No. | Champion | Date | Event | Location | Reign | Days | Notes | Ref. |
|---|---|---|---|---|---|---|---|---|
| 1 | SoCal Uncensored (Frankie Kazarian and Scorpio Sky) | October 30, 2019 | Dynamite | Charleston, WV | 1 | 83 | Defeated The Lucha Brothers (Pentagón Jr. and Rey Fénix) in a tournament final to become the inaugural champions. | |
| 2 | "Hangman" Adam Page and Kenny Omega | January 21, 2020 | Dynamite: Chris Jericho's Rock 'N' Wrestling Rager at Sea | Nassau, Bahamas | 1 | 228 | Took place aboard Norwegian Pearl. Taped and aired as part of the January 22 episode of Dynamite. | |
| 3 | FTR (Cash Wheeler and Dax Harwood) | September 5, 2020 | All Out | Jacksonville, FL | 1 | 63 | | |
| 4 | The Young Bucks (Matt Jackson and Nick Jackson) | November 7, 2020 | Full Gear | Jacksonville, FL | 1 | 302 | This was a Last Chance match where if The Young Bucks had lost, they would have never been able to challenge for the championship again. Additionally, FTR's manager Tully Blanchard was barred from ringside. | |
| 5 | The Lucha Brothers (Penta El Zero Miedo and Rey Fénix) | September 5, 2021 | All Out | Hoffman Estates, IL | 1 | 122 | This was a Steel Cage match. | |
| 6 | Jurassic Express (Jungle Boy and Luchasaurus) | January 5, 2022 | Dynamite | Newark, NJ | 1 | 161 | | |
| 7 | The Young Bucks (Matt Jackson and Nick Jackson) | June 15, 2022 | Dynamite: Road Rager | St. Louis, MO | 2 | 28 | This was a ladder match. | |
| 8 | Swerve in Our Glory (Swerve Strickland and Keith Lee) | July 13, 2022 | Dynamite: Fyter Fest; Night 1 | Savannah, GA | 1 | 70 | This was a three-way tag team match, also involving Team Taz (Powerhouse Hobbs and Ricky Starks) who Swerve in Our Glory pinned. | |
| 9 | The Acclaimed (Anthony Bowens and Max Caster) | September 21, 2022 | Dynamite: Grand Slam | Queens, NY | 1 | 140 | | |
| 10 | The Gunns (Austin Gunn and Colten Gunn) | February 8, 2023 | Dynamite: Championship Fight Night | El Paso, TX | 1 | 56 | | |
| 11 | FTR (Cash Wheeler and Dax Harwood) | April 5, 2023 | Dynamite | Elmont, NY | 2 | 185 | This was a Title vs. Career match. | |
| 12 | Big Bill and Ricky Starks | October 7, 2023 | Collision | Salt Lake City, UT | 1 | 123 | | |
| 13 | Darby Allin and Sting | February 7, 2024 | Dynamite | Phoenix, AZ | 1 | 25 | This was a tornado tag team match. | |
| — | Vacated | March 3, 2024 | Revolution | Greensboro, NC | — | — | Following Sting's retirement match at the event, he and Darby Allin relinquished the title. | |
| 14 | The Young Bucks (Matthew Jackson and Nicholas Jackson) | April 21, 2024 | Dynasty | St. Louis, MO | 3 | 192 | Defeated FTR (Dax Harwood and Cash Wheeler) in a ladder match, which was a tournament final for the vacant title. Matthew and Nicholas were previously known as Matt and Nick. | |
| 15 | Private Party (Isiah Kassidy and Marq Quen) | October 30, 2024 | Fright Night Dynamite | Cleveland, OH | 1 | 84 | Had Private Party lost, they would have had to disband as a team. | |
| 16 | The Hurt Syndicate (Bobby Lashley and Shelton Benjamin) | January 22, 2025 | Dynamite | Knoxville, TN | 1 | 214 | | |
| 17 | Brodido (Brody King and Bandido) | August 24, 2025 | Forbidden Door | London, England | 1 | 90 | This was a three-way tag team match also involving FTR (Dax Harwood and Cash Wheeler). | |
| 18 | FTR (Cash Wheeler and Dax Harwood) | November 22, 2025 | Full Gear | Newark, NJ | 3 | 183 | | |
| 19 | Cage and Cope (Christian Cage and Adam Copeland) | May 24, 2026 | Double or Nothing | Queens, NY | 1 | 125 | This was a New York Street Fight "I Quit" match where if Cage and Cope had lost, they would have disbanded as a team forever. | |
| 20 | The Young Bucks (Matt Jackson and Nick Jackson) | September 26, 2026 | All Out | Hoffman Estates, IL | 4 | 57+ | This was a Three-way ladder match, also involving FTR (Cash Wheeler and Dax Harwood). | |

== Combined reigns ==
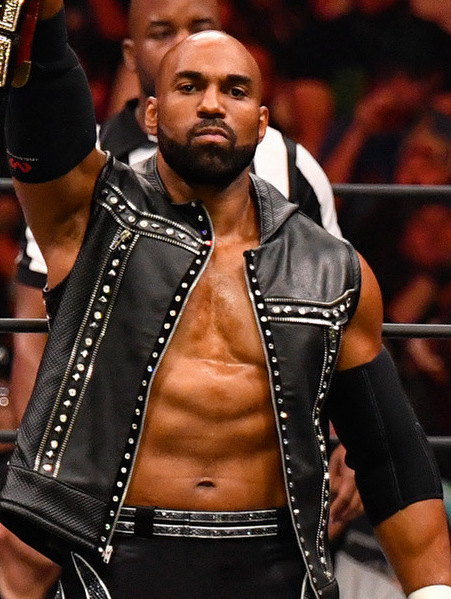
Inaugural champions SCU (Frankie Kazarian and Scorpio Sky)

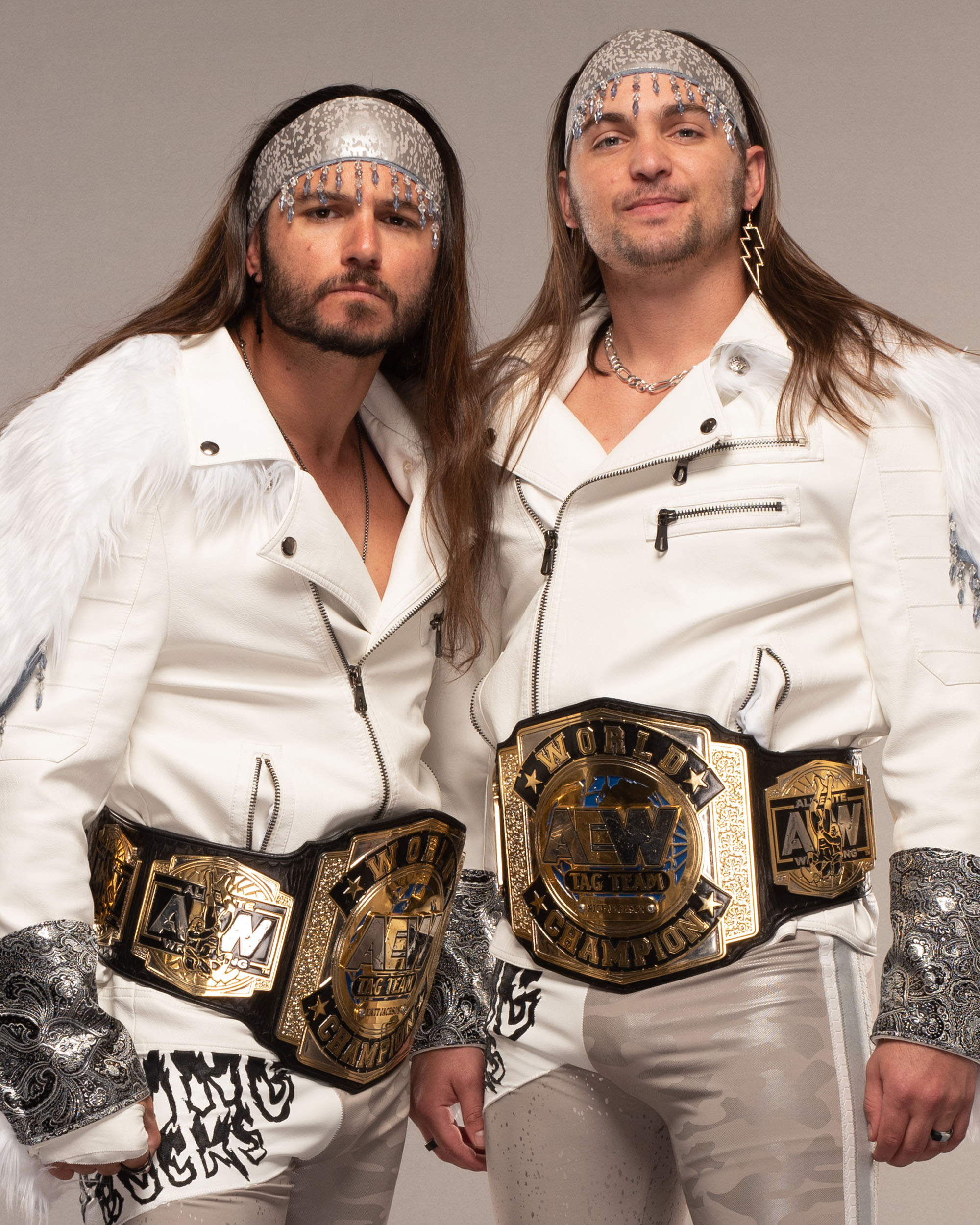
Record-setting 4-time champions The Young Bucks (Nick/Nicholas Jackson and Matt/Matthew Jackson); they are also the longest-reigning champions at 302 days for their first reign, and they have the most combined days as champions at 578+ days.

As of November 22, 2026.

Key
| † | Current champion; reign changing daily |
| <1 | Reign was less than a day |

=== By team ===
| Rank | Champion | No. of reigns | Combined days |
|---|---|---|---|
| 1 | The Young Bucks † (Matt/Mathew Jackson and Nick/Nicholas Jackson) | 4 | 578+ |
| 2 | FTR (Cash Wheeler and Dax Harwood) | 3 | 431 |
| 3 | "Hangman" Adam Page and Kenny Omega | 1 | 228 |
| 4 | The Hurt Syndicate (Bobby Lashley and Shelton Benjamin) | 1 | 214 |
| 5 | Jurassic Express (Jungle Boy and Luchasaurus) | 1 | 161 |
| 6 | The Acclaimed (Anthony Bowens and Max Caster) | 1 | 140 |
| 7 | Cage and Cope (Christian Cage and Adam Copeland) | 1 | 125 |
| 8 | Big Bill and Ricky Starks | 1 | 123 |
| 9 | Lucha Brothers (Penta El Zero Miedo and Rey Fénix) | 1 | 122 |
| 10 | Brodido (Brody King and Bandido) | 1 | 90 |
| 11 | Private Party (Isiah Kassidy and Marq Quen) | 1 | 84 |
| 12 | SCU (Frankie Kazarian and Scorpio Sky) | 1 | 83 |
| 13 | Swerve in Our Glory (Swerve Strickland and Keith Lee) | 1 | 70 |
| 14 | The Gunns (Austin Gunn and Colten Gunn) | 1 | 56 |
| 15 | Darby Allin and Sting | 1 | 25 |

=== By wrestler ===
| Rank | Champion | No. of reigns | Combined days |
|---|---|---|---|
| 1 | Matt/Matthew Jackson † | 4 | 578+ |
| 1 | Nick/Nicholas Jackson † | 4 | 578+ |
| 3 | Cash Wheeler | 3 | 431 |
| 3 | Dax Harwood | 3 | 431 |
| 5 | "Hangman" Adam Page | 1 | 228 |
| 5 | Kenny Omega | 1 | 228 |
| 7 | Bobby Lashley | 1 | 214 |
| 7 | Shelton Benjamin | 1 | 214 |
| 9 | Jungle Boy | 1 | 161 |
| 9 | Luchasaurus | 1 | 161 |
| 11 | Anthony Bowens | 1 | 140 |
| 11 | Max Caster | 1 | 140 |
| 13 | Adam Copeland | 1 | 125 |
| 13 | Christian Cage | 1 | 125 |
| 15 | Big Bill | 1 | 123 |
| 15 | Ricky Starks | 1 | 123 |
| 17 | Penta El Zero Miedo | 1 | 122 |
| 17 | Rey Fénix | 1 | 122 |
| 19 | Bandido | 1 | 90 |
| 19 | Brody King | 1 | 90 |
| 21 | Isiah Kassidy | 1 | 84 |
| 21 | Marq Quen | 1 | 84 |
| 23 | Frankie Kazarian | 1 | 83 |
| 23 | Scorpio Sky | 1 | 83 |
| 25 | Keith Lee | 1 | 70 |
| 25 | Swerve Strickland | 1 | 70 |
| 27 | Austin Gunn | 1 | 56 |
| 27 | Colten Gunn | 1 | 56 |
| 29 | Darby Allin | 1 | 25 |
| 29 | Sting | 1 | 25 |
