= List of AEW TNT Champions =

Professional wrestling champions

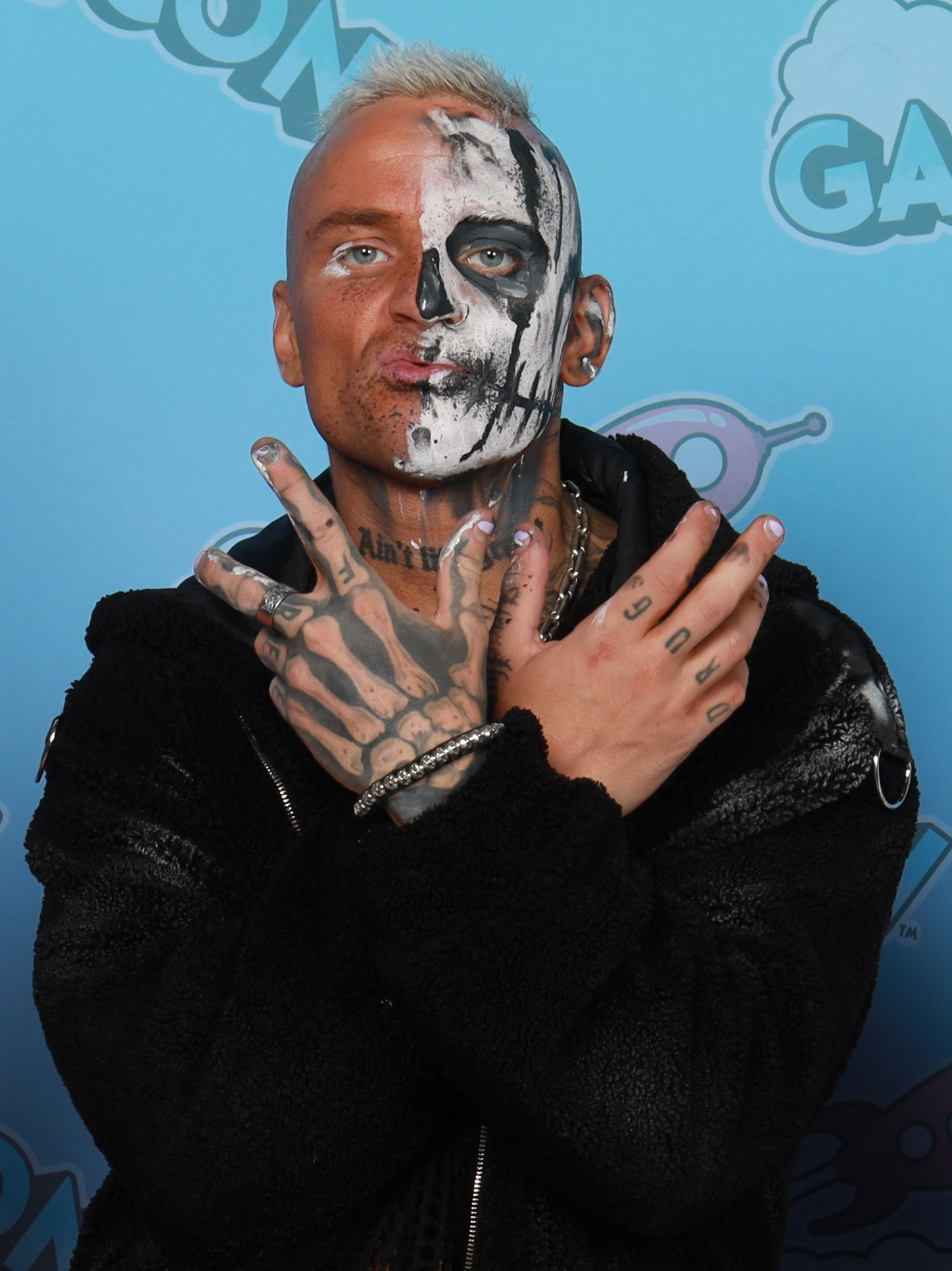
Current and record-tying three-time champion Darby Allin

The AEW TNT Championship is a men's professional wrestling television championship created and promoted by the American promotion All Elite Wrestling (AEW). Established on March 30, 2020, it is named after the TNT television network, which currently airs AEW's weekly program, Collision.

Overall, there have been 33 reigns between 20 champions and three vacancies. Cody Rhodes, then known simply as Cody, was the inaugural champion. Rhodes, Sammy Guevara, Wardlow, and Darby Allin are tied for the most reigns at three. Allin's first reign is the longest at 186 days, and he has the longest combined reign at 245+ days across his three reigns, while Adam Copeland's first reign is the shortest at 3 minutes and 30 seconds. Daniel Garcia is the youngest champion at 26 years, 67 days old, while Dustin Rhodes is the oldest, winning the title at 56 years.

The reigning champion is Darby Allin, who is in his record-tying third reign. He won the title by defeating previous champion Kevin Knight in a Falls Count Anywhere match at All In on August 30, 2026.

== Title history ==
Key
No.	Overall reign number
Reign	Reign number for the specific champion
Days	Number of days held
Days recog.	Number of days held recognized by the promotion
<1	Reign lasted less than a day
+	Current reign is changing daily

No.	Champion	Championship change			Reign statistics			Notes	Ref.
No.	Champion	Date	Event	Location	Reign	Days	Days recog.	Notes	Ref.
1	Cody	May 23, 2020	Double or Nothing	Jacksonville, FL	1	82	91	Defeated Lance Archer in the finals of an eight-man single-elimination tournament to become the inaugural champion. AEW recognizes Cody's reign as ending on August 22, 2020, when the following episode aired on tape delay.	
2	Mr. Brodie Lee	August 13, 2020	Dynamite	Jacksonville, FL	1	55	46	AEW recognizes Lee's reign as beginning on August 22, 2020, when the episode aired on tape delay.	
3	Cody	October 7, 2020	Dynamite: Chris Jericho's 30th Anniversary Celebration	Jacksonville, FL	2	31	31	This was a Dog Collar match.	
4	Darby Allin	November 7, 2020	Full Gear	Jacksonville, FL	1	186	186		
5	Miro	May 12, 2021	Dynamite	Jacksonville, FL	1	140	140		
6	Sammy Guevara	September 29, 2021	Dynamite	Rochester, NY	1	84	87	AEW recognizes Guevara's reign as ending on December 25, 2021, when the following episode aired on tape delay.	
7	Cody Rhodes	December 22, 2021	Rampage: Holiday Bash	Greensboro, NC	3	35	32	AEW recognizes Rhodes' reign as beginning on December 25, 2021, when the episode aired on tape delay, and ending on January 26, 2022. Previously known as Cody.	
—	Sammy Guevara (Interim)	January 8, 2022	Battle of the Belts I	Charlotte, NC	—	18	—	Lineal champion Cody Rhodes was originally scheduled to defend the title against Guevara at this event, but was pulled due to COVID-19-related issues. Guevara was instead scheduled to face Dustin Rhodes to determine the interim TNT Champion.	
8	Sammy Guevara	January 26, 2022	Dynamite: Beach Break	Cleveland, OH	2	42	42	Defeated lineal champion Cody Rhodes in a ladder match to determine the undisputed champion. AEW officially recognizes this as the start of Guevara's second reign.	
9	Scorpio Sky	March 9, 2022	Dynamite	Estero, FL	1	37	38	AEW recognizes Sky's reign as ending on April 16, 2022, when the following event aired on tape delay.	
10	Sammy Guevara	April 15, 2022	Battle of the Belts II	Garland, TX	3	12	11	AEW recognizes Guevara's reign as beginning on April 16, 2022, when the event aired on tape delay.	
11	Scorpio Sky	April 27, 2022	Dynamite	Philadelphia, PA	2	70	70	This was a ladder match.	
12	Wardlow	July 6, 2022	Dynamite	Rochester, NY	1	136	136	This was a Street Fight.	
13	Samoa Joe	November 19, 2022	Full Gear	Newark, NJ	1	46	46	This was a three-way match, also involving Powerhouse Hobbs, who Joe submitted.	
14	Darby Allin	January 4, 2023	Dynamite	Seattle, WA	2	28	28		
15	Samoa Joe	February 1, 2023	Dynamite	Dayton, OH	2	32	32	This was a No Holds Barred match.	
16	Wardlow	March 5, 2023	Revolution	San Francisco, CA	2	3	3		
17	Powerhouse Hobbs	March 8, 2023	Dynamite	Sacramento, CA	1	42	42	This was a Falls Count Anywhere match that Hobbs won by technical knockout.	
18	Wardlow	April 19, 2023	Dynamite	Pittsburgh, PA	3	59	59		
19	Luchasaurus	June 17, 2023	Collision	Chicago, IL	1	98	98		
20	Christian Cage	September 23, 2023	Collision	Grand Rapids, MI	1	98	98	This was a three-way match, also involving Darby Allin.	
21	Adam Copeland	December 30, 2023	Worlds End	Uniondale, NY	1	<1	<1	This was a no disqualification match.	
22	Christian Cage	December 30, 2023	Worlds End	Uniondale, NY	2	81	81	After his loss to Copeland, Cage immediately invoked the title shot earned by his Patriarchy member Killswitch earlier that night to get an immediate rematch.	
23	Adam Copeland	March 20, 2024	Dynamite/Rampage	Toronto, ON, Canada	2	70	70	This was an "I Quit" match. The match started as the main event of Dynamite and concluded at the start of Rampage, which aired back-to-back.	
—	Vacated	May 29, 2024	Dynamite	Inglewood, CA	—	—	—	AEW executive vice presidents The Young Bucks (Matthew Jackson and Nicholas Jackson) stripped Adam Copeland of the title due to Copeland's legitimate leg injury incurred at Double or Nothing three days prior.	
24	Jack Perry	June 30, 2024	Forbidden Door	Elmont, NY	1	146	146	Defeated Mark Briscoe, Konosuke Takeshita, Dante Martin, Lio Rush, and El Phantasmo in a six-man ladder match to win the vacant title.	
25	Daniel Garcia	November 23, 2024	Full Gear	Newark, NJ	1	134	134		
26	Adam Cole	April 6, 2025	Dynasty	Philadelphia, PA	1	97	97		
—	Vacated	July 12, 2025	All In: Texas; Zero Hour	Arlington, TX	—	—	—	Adam Cole vacated the title due to not being medically cleared to compete for an indefinite period of time.	
27	Dustin Rhodes	July 12, 2025	All In: Texas	Arlington, TX	1	19	19	Originally scheduled as a singles match in which Adam Cole was to defend the title against Kyle Fletcher. After Cole relinquished the title, the match became a four-way match between Fletcher, Daniel Garcia, Sammy Guevara, and Dustin Rhodes for the vacant title.	
28	Kyle Fletcher	July 31, 2025	Collision	Chicago, IL	1	114	114	This was a Chicago Street Fight.	
29	Mark Briscoe	November 22, 2025	Full Gear	Newark, NJ	1	70	70	This was a No Disqualification match where if Briscoe had lost, he would have been forced to join Kyle Fletcher in The Don Callis Family.	
30	Tommaso Ciampa	January 31, 2026	Collision	Arlington, TX	1	11	11		
31	Kyle Fletcher	February 11, 2026	Dynamite	Ontario, CA	2	56	56		
—	Vacated	April 8, 2026	–	–	—	—	—	The title was vacated due to Kyle Fletcher suffering an injury.	
32	Kevin Knight	April 12, 2026	Dynasty	Vancouver, BC, Canada	1	140	140	Pinned Daniel Garcia in a 10-man Casino Gauntlet match for the vacant title.	
33	Darby Allin	August 30, 2026	All In	London, England	3	32+	32+	This was a Falls Count Anywhere match.	

== Combined reigns ==
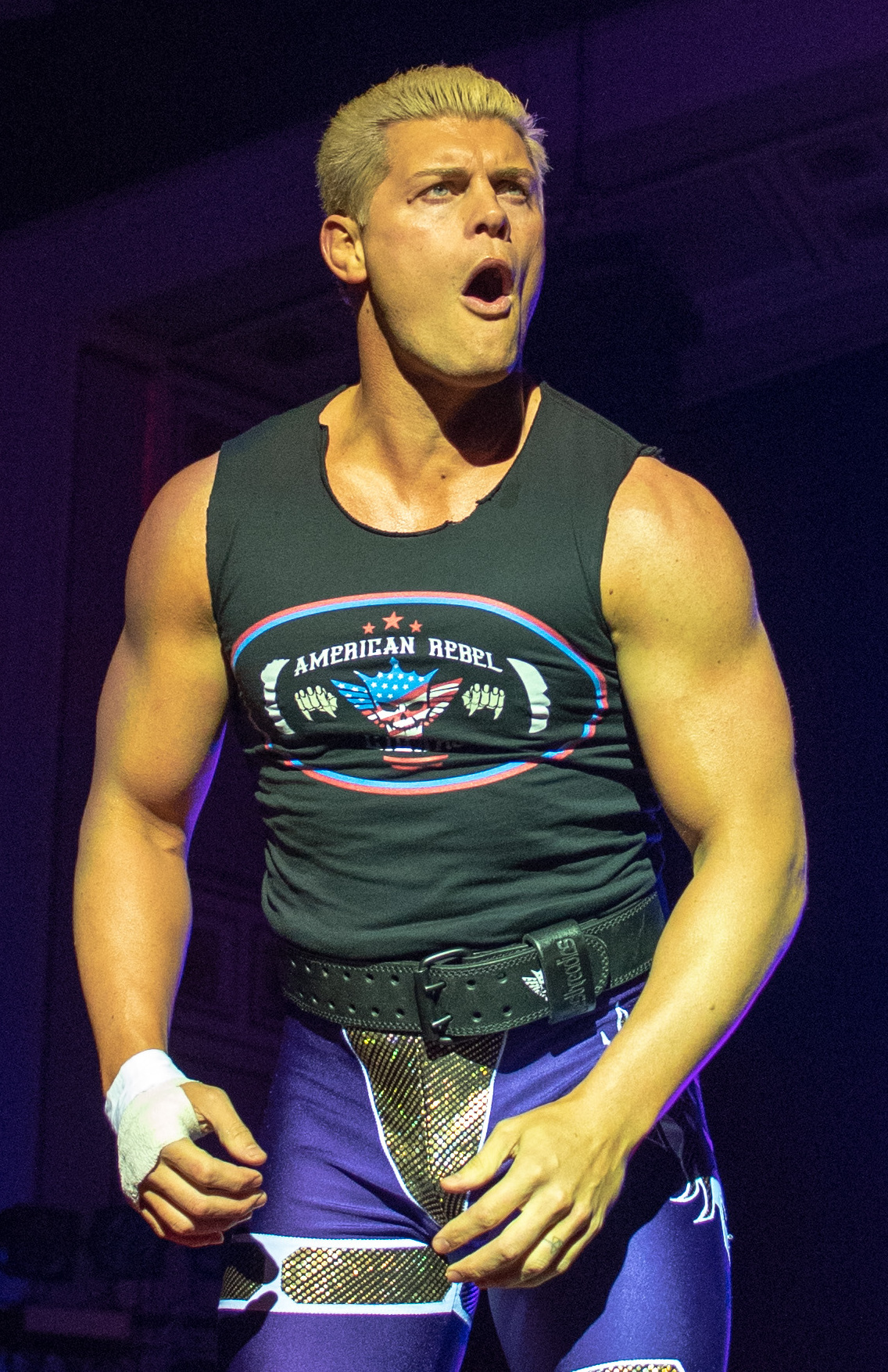
Inaugural and record-tying three-time champion Cody Rhodes.

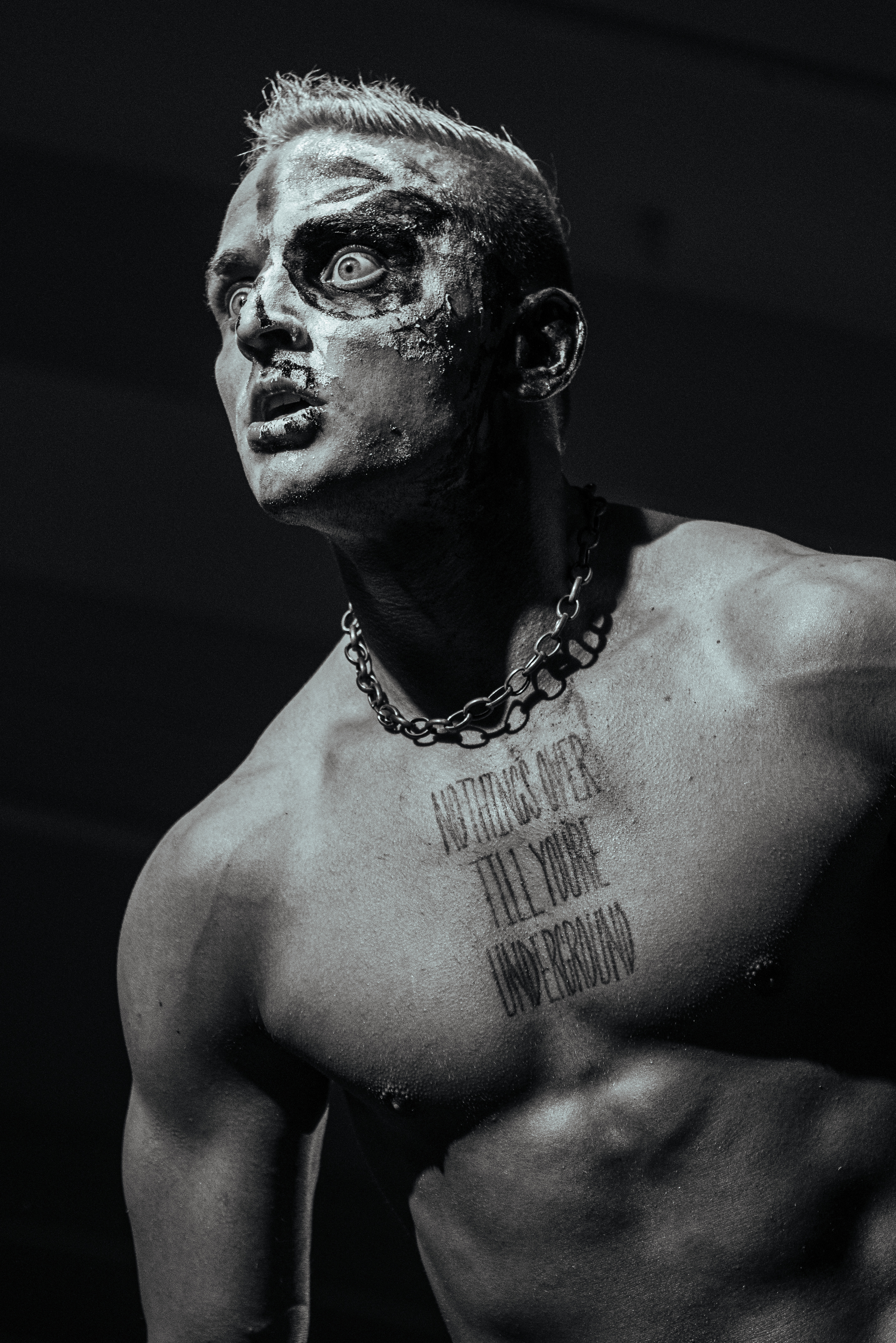
Record-tying three-time champion Darby Allin; he has the longest singular reign for the title at 186 days for his first reign, as well as the longest combined reign at 245+ days.

As of October 1, 2026.

†	Indicates the current champion

Rank	Wrestler	No. of reigns	Combined days	Combined days rec. by AEW
1	Darby Allin †	3	245+	
2	Wardlow	3	198	
3	Christian Cage	2	179	
4	Kyle Fletcher	2	170	
5	Cody Rhodes	3	148	154
6	Jack Perry	1	146	
7	Kevin Knight	1	140	
8	Miro	1	140	
9	Sammy Guevara	3	138	140
10	Daniel Garcia	1	134	
11	Scorpio Sky	2	107	108
12	Luchasaurus	1	98	
13	Adam Cole	1	97	
14	Samoa Joe	2	78	
15	Adam Copeland	2	70	
15	Mark Briscoe	1	70	
17	Mr. Brodie Lee	1	55	46
18	Powerhouse Hobbs	1	42	
19	Dustin Rhodes	1	19	
20	Tommaso Ciampa	1	11	
