= Darby Allin =

American professional wrestler (born 1993)

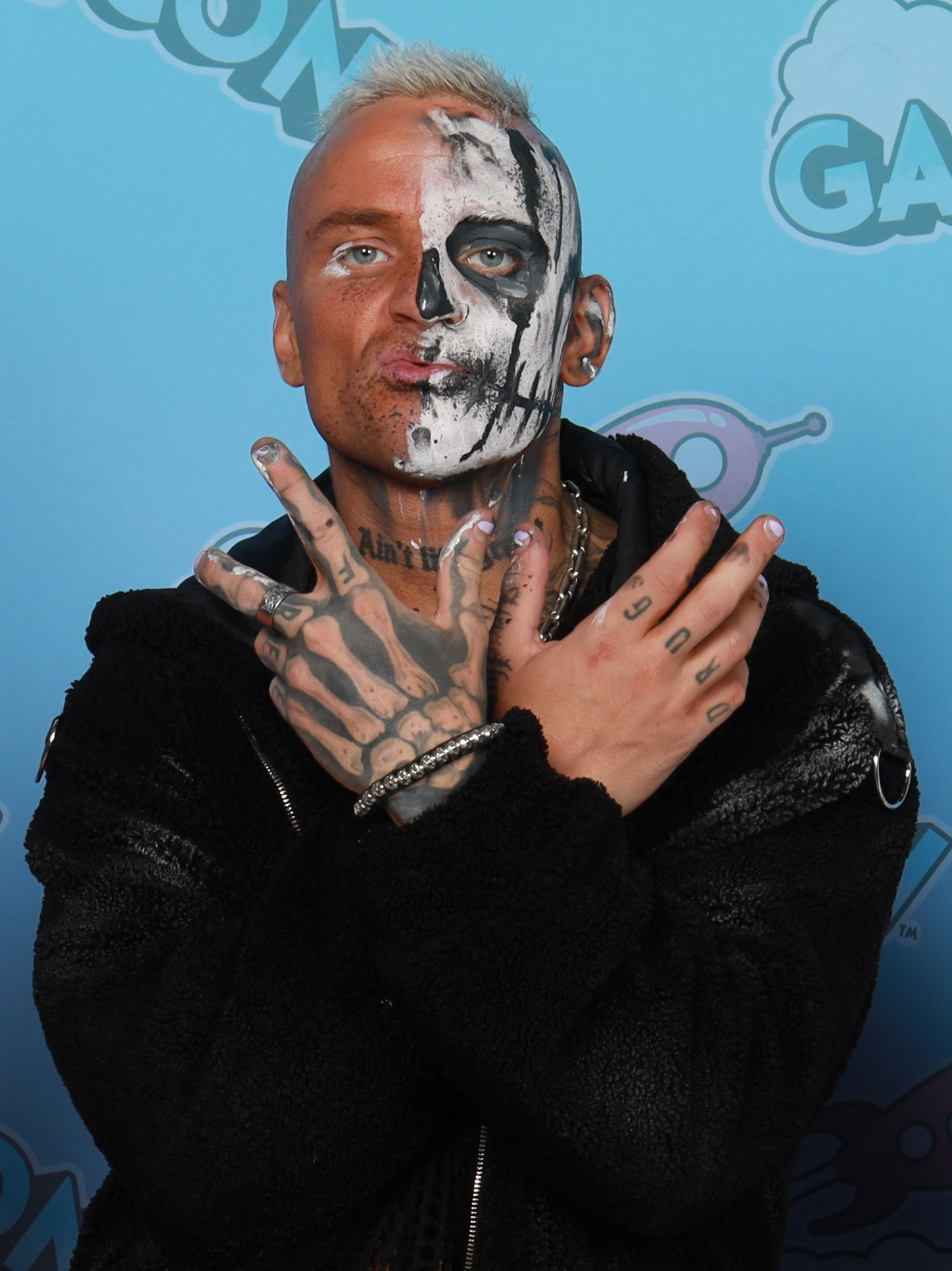
- Allin in 2025

Personal information
- Born: Samuel Ratsch; January 7, 1993 (age 33) Arizona, U.S.
- Spouses: Priscilla Kelly (m. 2018; div. 2020) Sara Ratsch (m. 2026)

Professional wrestling career
- Ring names: Darby Allin; Darby Graves
- Billed height: 5 ft 8 in (173 cm)
- Billed weight: 180 lb (82 kg)
- Billed from: Seattle, Washington
- Trained by: AR Fox; Buddy Wayne
- Debut: 2014

Samuel Ratsch (born January 7, 1993) is an American professional wrestler. As of April 2019, he is signed to All Elite Wrestling (AEW), where he performs under the ring name Darby Allin and is the current AEW TNT Champion in his record-tying third reign.

Ratsch began his professional wrestling career in 2014, competing for various independent promotions including EVOLVE, Progress Wrestling, Major League Wrestling, and Lucha Libre AAA Worldwide before signing with AEW in 2019. Since then, he has become one of the promotion’s most featured performers, appearing in major matches at events such as All Out, Full Gear, Revolution, and All In, and winning championships, including the AEW TNT Championship thrice, the AEW World Championship once, and the AEW World Tag Team Championship once (with Sting).

His wrestling persona incorporates influences from punk rock and skateboarding culture and is known for a high-risk, unorthodox in-ring style. Outside the ring, Ratsch lives a straight edge lifestyle and has pursued interests in filmmaking, skateboarding, and mountaineering.

== Early life ==
Samuel Ratsch was born in Arizona on January 7, 1993. During his youth, he participated in track and field and played football, inspired in part by one of his grandfathers, who had played in the National Football League. He also briefly took part in amateur wrestling, mistakenly believing it was the same as professional wrestling. Ratsch attended a film school in Arizona but left to pursue a career in skateboarding.

== Professional wrestling career ==
=== Early career (2014–2019) ===
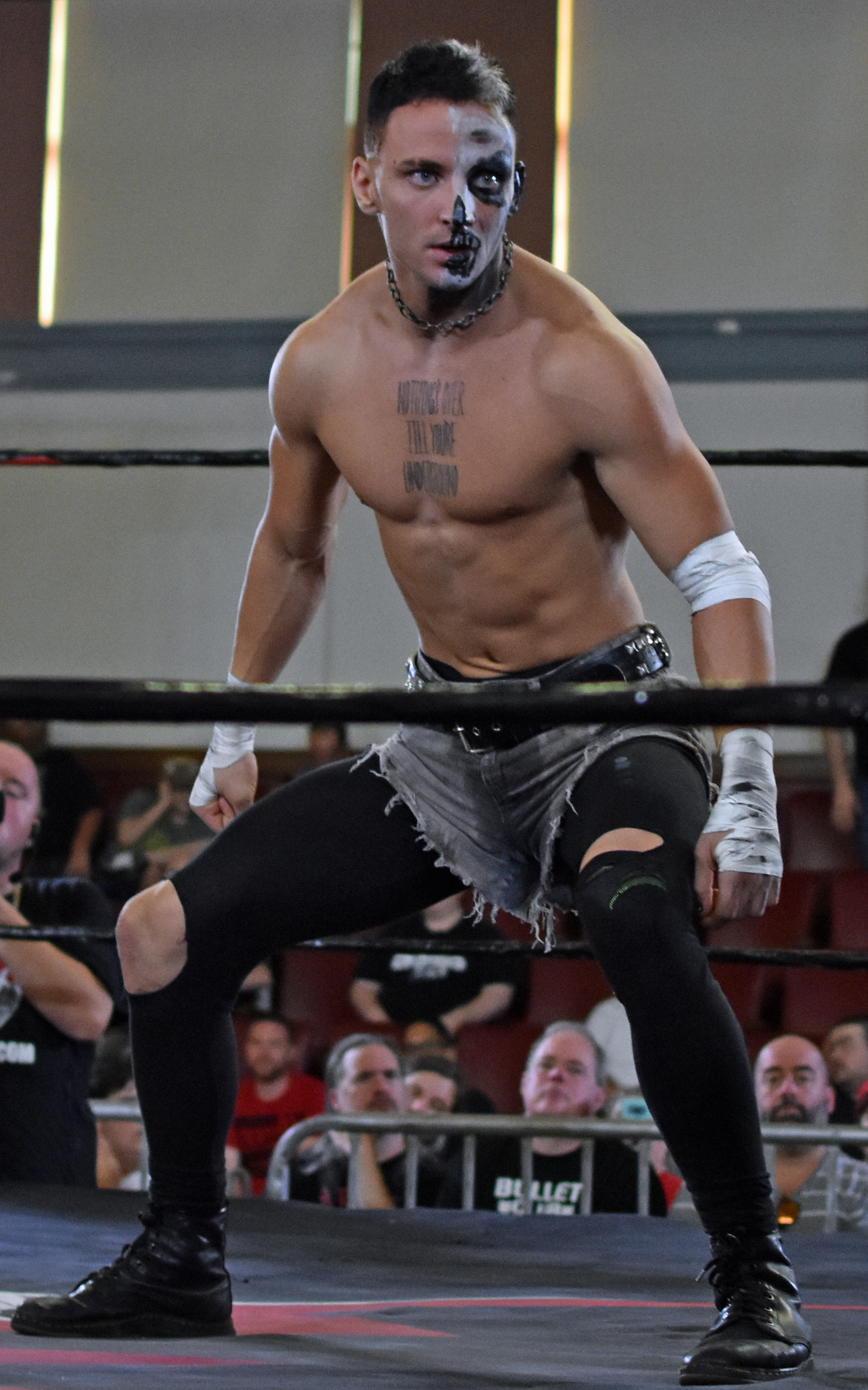
Allin in August 2018

Ratsch was trained by AR Fox and Buddy Wayne. In 2014, under the ring name Darby Graves, he made his debut for Blue Collar Wrestling in Portland, Oregon. He later adopted the ring name Darby Allin and competed extensively across the American independent circuit between 2015 and 2019. During this time, he wrestled for a variety of promotions including EVOLVE, Game Changer Wrestling (GCW), Pro Wrestling Guerrilla (PWG), The Wrestling Revolver, and Full Impact Pro (FIP).

Allin became a regular performer for EVOLVE, a promotion affiliated with the World Wrestling Network (WWN), making his debut at EVOLVE 59 in April 2016. Over the next three years, he frequently appeared for both EVOLVE and WWN-affiliated events until April 2019. He also appeared in Major League Wrestling (MLW) between 2017 and 2018, beginning at MLW One-Shot. He departed MLW in April 2018 due to scheduling conflicts with other promotions.

Allin made a one-off appearance for Lucha Libre AAA Worldwide at the 2018 Verano de Escándalo, competing in a six-way match. He also toured with British promotion Progress Wrestling in 2018 and 2019 during its events in the United States and its annual Super Strong Style 16 tournament.

=== All Elite Wrestling (2019–present) ===
==== Early storylines (2019–2020) ====
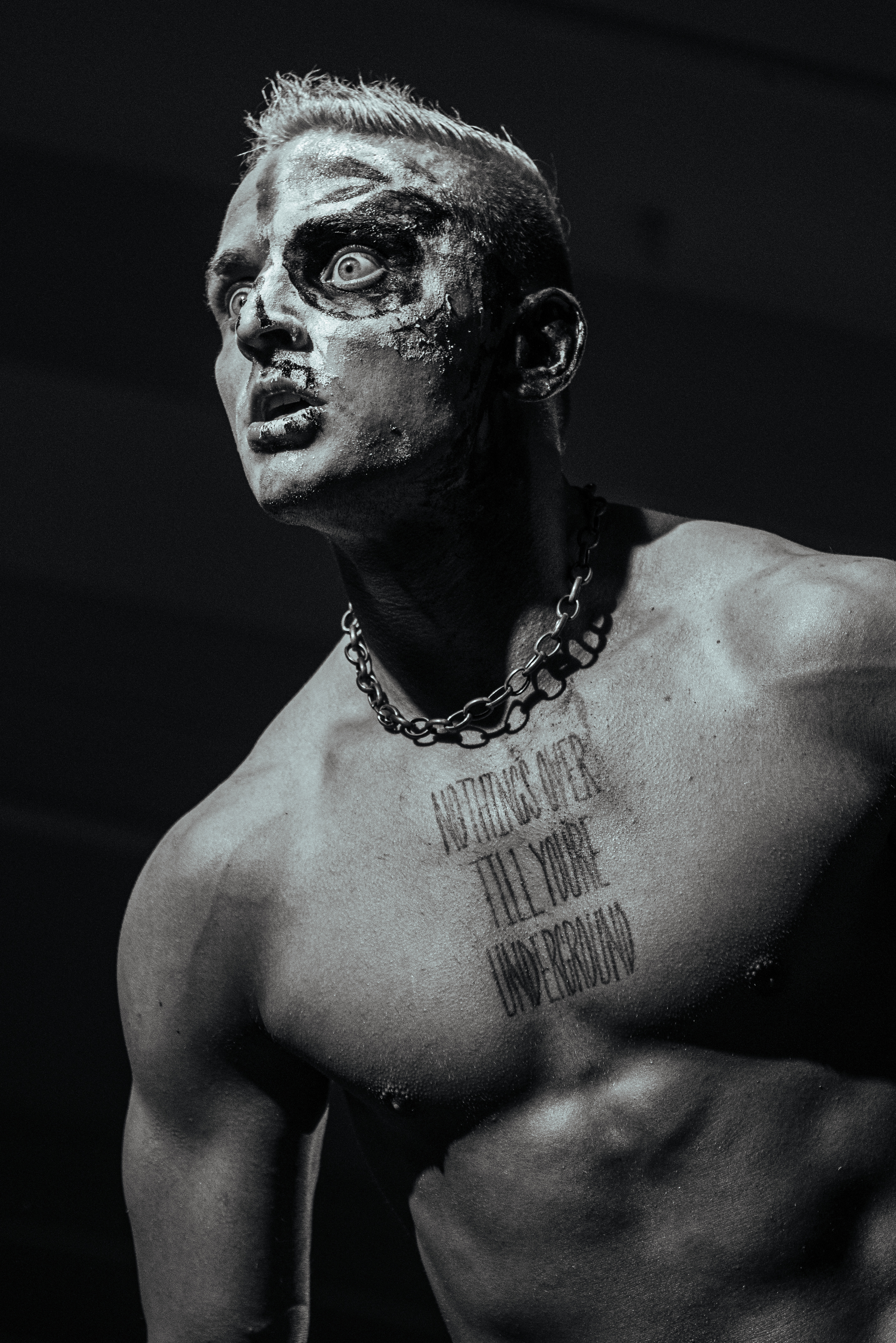
Allin in 2019

In April 2019, Allin signed with the recently established All Elite Wrestling (AEW). Two months later at Fyter Fest, he had his first match for the promotion, wrestling Cody to a time-limit draw. He then teamed with Joey Janela and Jimmy Havoc in a loss at Fight for the Fallen in July, leading to a three-way match between the trio at All Out in August, which Havoc won.

Later that year, Allin challenged AEW World Champion Chris Jericho on the October 16 episode of Dynamite, but was unsuccessful. In January 2020, he competed in a four-man tournament for a championship opportunity, where he was eliminated by Pac in the opening round. He then entered a rivalry with Sammy Guevara, culminating in a win at Revolution on February 29.

Allin participated in the tournament to crown the inaugural TNT Champion, defeating Guevara in the quarterfinals before losing to Cody in the semifinals on the April 22 episode of Dynamite. At Double or Nothing on May 23, he took part in the first Casino ladder match, which was won by Brian Cage. After returning to television in July, he resumed his feud with Cage and Ricky Starks, teaming with AEW World Champion Jon Moxley to defeat them in a tag match. That led to a title bout against Moxley the following week, which Allin lost. On the September 30 episode of Dynamite, Allin defeated Starks, concluding their feud.

==== TNT Champion and teaming with Sting (2020–2024) ====
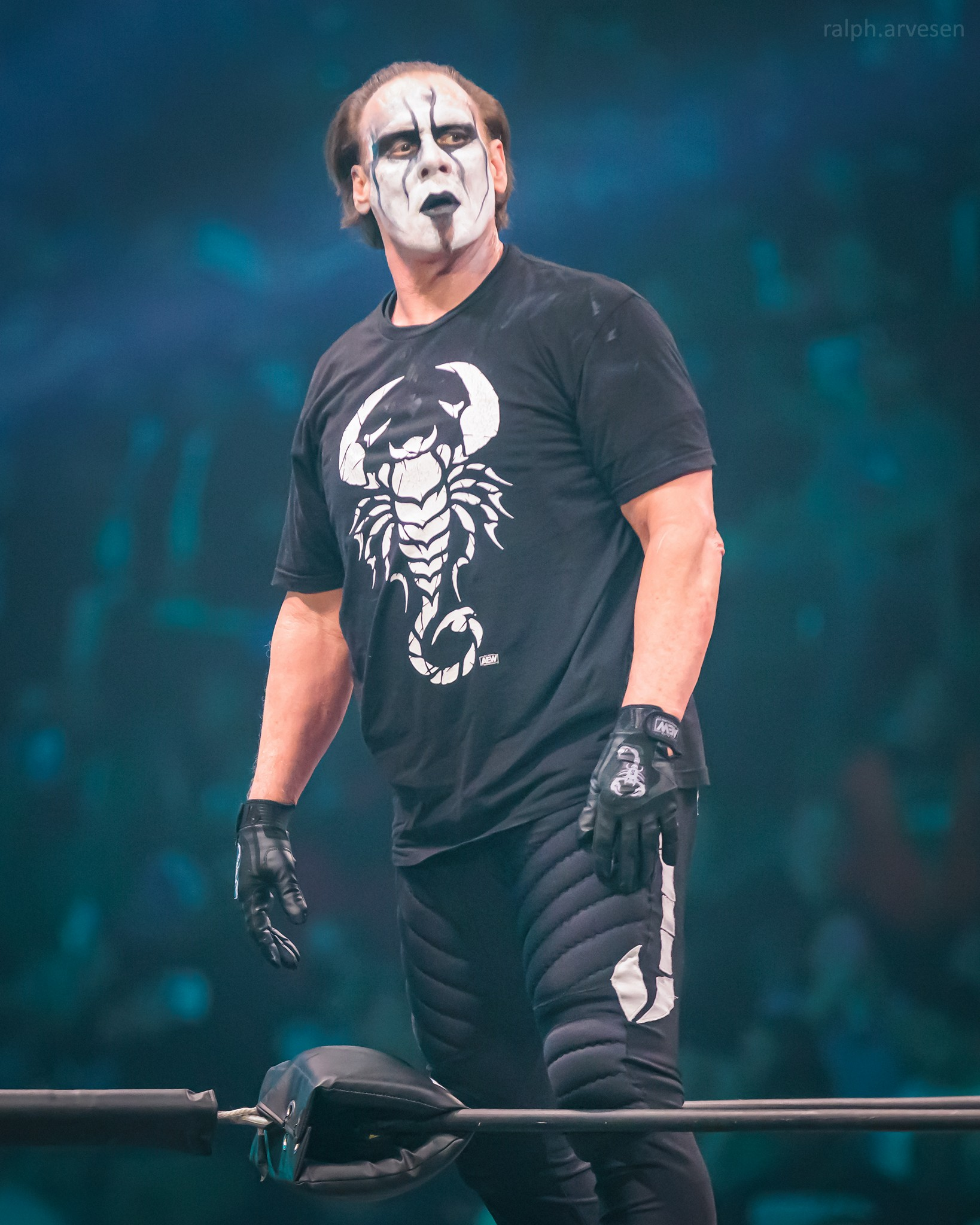
Sting served as Allin's tag team partner and on-screen mentor from 2020 to 2024 in AEW

At Full Gear on November 7, Allin defeated Cody to win the TNT Championship, his first title in AEW. In the following weeks, he became involved in a feud with Team Taz. Sting made his AEW debut at Winter Is Coming on December 2, confronting Team Taz and establishing an alliance with Allin.

The partnership led to a tag team match at Revolution on March 7, 2021, where Allin and Sting defeated Ricky Starks and Brian Cage in a cinematic-style street fight. During his reign, Allin defended the TNT Championship against the likes of Brian Cage, Scorpio Sky, John Silver, and The Butcher. His reign ended after 186 days with a loss to Miro on the May 12 episode of Dynamite.

Allin continued teaming with Sting, with the duo defeating Scorpio Sky and Ethan Page at Double or Nothing on May 30. He later faced Page in AEW’s first coffin match at Fyter Fest on July 14, coming out victorious. At All Out on September 5, Allin was selected as CM Punk’s first opponent in over seven years, losing the match. At Full Gear on November 13, Allin was defeated by MJF.

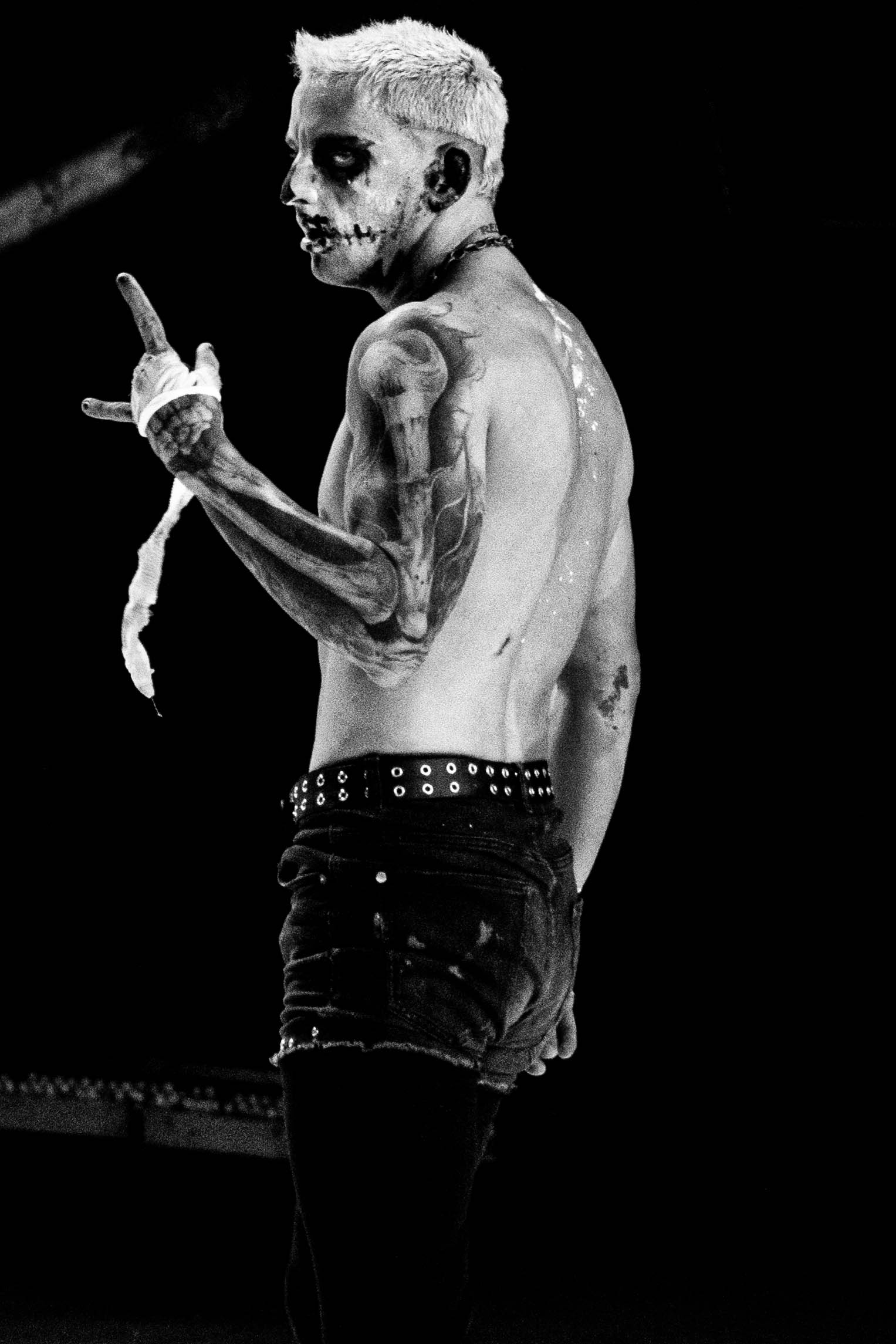
Allin at Forbidden Door in June 2022

Allin remained active in tag and multi-man matches, including a tornado tag team match win alongside Sting and Sammy Guevara at Revolution on March 6, 2022. On the May 12 episode of Dynamite, he was eliminated by Jeff Hardy in the Owen Hart Foundation Tournament after a widely discussed ladder spot.

Allin began a feud with TNT Champion Samoa Joe in late 2022. On the January 4, 2023, episode of Dynamite, he defeated Joe in his hometown of Seattle to win the TNT Championship for a second time. Later that month, Allin and Sting made a special appearance for Pro Wrestling Noah at The Great Muta Final "Bye-Bye", where they teamed with Keiji Muto in his final match under the Great Muta persona, winning in a six-man tag team match. Allin successfully defended the TNT Championship over the following four weeks against the likes of Mike Bennett, Juice Robinson, Kushida, and Buddy Matthews before losing it back to Joe on the February 1 episode of Dynamite in a no holds barred match.

At Double or Nothing on May 28, Allin competed in a four-way match for the AEW World Championship against MJF, Sammy Guevara, and Jack Perry, which MJF won. He reunited with Sting at All In on August 27, defeating Swerve Strickland and Christian Cage in a coffin match at Wembley Stadium. At All Out and WrestleDream, Allin unsuccesuflly challenged for the TNT Championship, losing to Luchasaurus and Christian Cage in a two out of three falls match. At Full Gear on November 18, Allin teamed with Sting and Adam Copeland to defeat The Patriarchy (Christian Cage, Luchasaurus and Nick Wayne).

On the February 7, 2024 episode of Dynamite, Allin and Sting defeated Ricky Starks and Big Bill to win the AEW World Tag Team Championship. They retained the titles against the Young Bucks at Revolution on March 3 in what was promoted as Sting’s retirement match. The titles were vacated shortly afterward, ending their reign at 25 days. Following Revolution, Allin was attacked on-screen by Bullet Club Gold in a post-match segment. It was later revealed that he had suffered a legitimate broken foot during his match against Jay White at Big Business on March 13, and the angle was used to write him off television. As a result, Allin postponed his planned expedition to climb Mount Everest.

==== Feud with the Death Riders (2024–2026) ====
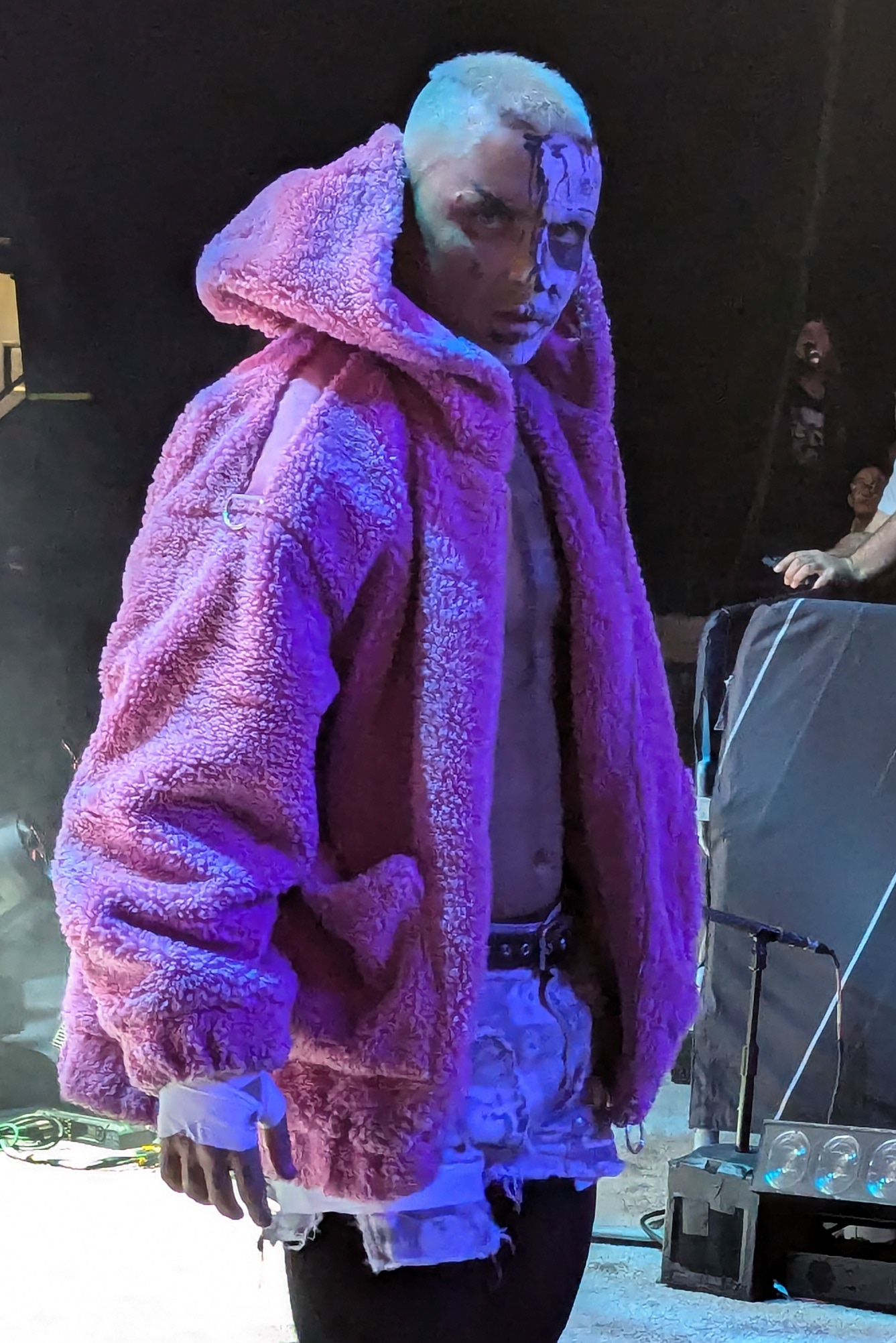
Allin in September 2024

Allin returned on the May 15 episode of Dynamite, aligning with Bryan Danielson and FTR in their ongoing feud with the Elite. He joined Team AEW for the Anarchy in the Arena match at Double or Nothing on May 26, which they lost. On July 24 at Blood and Guts, he helped lead Team AEW to victory over the Elite.

Two days later, Allin won the Royal Rampage battle royal, earning a future AEW World Championship opportunity. At All In on August 25, he unsuccessfully challenged Jack Perry for the TNT Championship in a coffin match. The following month, Jon Moxley challenged him for his earned title shot; the two faced off at Grand Slam, where Moxley defeated Allin.

At WrestleDream on October 12, Allin defeated Brody King. He later attempted to assist Bryan Danielson during an attack by the Blackpool Combat Club, only to be ambushed by Wheeler Yuta. In November, he was announced as a participant in the 2024 Continental Classic tournament, finishing with seven points and missing playoff qualification. On the December 27 episode of Rampage, he was attacked by the Death Riders (formerly the Blackpool Combat Club) and thrown down a stairwell in an angle designed to again remove him from television as he resumed Everest training.

On July 12 at All In, Allin and Danielson returned during the main event, fending off the Death Riders from interfering in the world title match between Moxley and Adam Page. On August 24 at Forbidden Door, Allin teamed with Hiroshi Tanahashi, Will Ospreay, and the Golden Lovers (Kenny Omega and Kota Ibushi) to defeat the Death Riders, The Young Bucks, and Gabe Kidd in a lights out steel cage match. At All Out on September 20, Allin was defeated by Moxley in a coffin match following interference from a returning Pac. At WrestleDream on October 18, Allin finally defeated Moxley in an I Quit match after a surprise interference from Sting. On November 12 at Blood & Guts, Allin teamed with Kyle O'Reilly, Mark Briscoe, Orange Cassidy, and Roderick Strong in a Blood and Guts match, where they defeated the Death Riders (Jon Moxley, Claudio Castagnoli, Wheeler Yuta, Daniel Garcia, and Pac). At Full Gear on November 22, Allin was defeated by Pac. On November 24, Allin was announced as a participant in the 2025 Continental Classic tournament, where he was placed in the Gold League, but was forced to pull out to the tournament due to injury and was replaced by "Jungle" Jack Perry. After returning from injury, Allin began feuding with the "hired mercenary" of the Death Riders in Gabe Kidd, which culminated at Worlds End on December 27, where Allin defeated Kidd. On January 14, 2026 at Dynamite: Maximum Carnage, Allin defeated Pac in a Full Gear rematch, defeating the only member of the Death Riders he hadn't yet defeated and ending his feud with the stable.

==== Championship reigns (2026–present) ====
Allin in August 2026.

After defeating Pac, Allin set his sights on the AEW World Championship, but was sidetracked after being attacked by The Dogs (David Finlay, Clark Connors, and Gabe Kidd). At Revolution on March 15, Allin teamed with Orange Cassidy and Roderick Strong to defeat The Dogs in a tornado trios match. On the following episode of Dynamite, Allin defeated Kidd in a coffin match to end their feud. Following the match, Allin would call out reigning champion MJF and reaffirm his desire to be AEW World Champion. On April 12 at Dynasty, Allin defeated Andrade El Idolo to earn a future AEW World Championship match. Allin opted to invoke his right to a title shot three days later at Dynamite: Spring BreakThru in Everett, Washington, not far from where Allin grew up in Seattle. At Spring BreakThru, Allin defeated MJF to win the AEW World Championship for the first time in his career, and beat the record for the quickest AEW title win, at 2 minutes 15 seconds, beating Jon Moxley's 3 minutes 10 seconds win over CM Punk. Over the following weeks on Dynamite and Collision, Allin would successfully defend his title against the likes of Tommaso Ciampa, Brody King, Kevin Knight, Pac, Konosuke Takeshita, Sammy Guevara, and "Speedball" Mike Bailey before losing it back to MJF in a Title vs. Hair match at Double or Nothing on May 24, ending his reign at 39 days. After being defeated by MJF, Allin was attacked by Kevin Knight.

After months of feuding, Allin would defeat Knight at All In on August 30 in a Falls Count Anywhere match to win his record-tying third TNT Championship. On September 26 at All Out, Allin teamed with his protoege and son of his mentor Sting, Steven Borden in a losing effort to Kyle Fletcher and Kevin Knight via doctor stoppage after Borden suffered a legitimate injury during the match. On the October 14 episode of Collision, Allin successfully defended his title against Hechicero, while also qualifying for the Clockwork Carnage match for the AEW World Championship at WrestleDream, but failed to win the title at the event three days later. On November 4, Allin competed in a six-on-six Blood and Guts match at the namesake event, where his team was defeated. Following the match, Allin was thrown off the top of the cage by Wardlow.

== Professional wrestling style and persona ==
=== Persona ===
The Darby Allin persona draws heavily from Ratsch's personal background and interests. The name itself is a tribute to punk rock figures Darby Crash and GG Allin. His face paint, typically a half-skull design, is meant to symbolize his feeling of being "half-dead" after he survived a car accident in his youth that killed his uncle.

Allin incorporates his skateboarding background into his in-ring character. He rides a skateboard during his entrance and occasionally uses it as a prop or weapon in matches. Known for his unorthodox, high-risk style, he frequently performs dives and other extreme maneuvers that contribute to his daredevil image. Initially hesitant to combine skateboarding with wrestling as he feared that both fandoms would perceive it as inauthentic, he eventually embraced the crossover after encouragement from Chris Jericho, who advised him to lean into what made him unique.

=== Professional wrestling style ===
Allin has cited Mick Foley as one of the inspirations for his style.

At the same time, Allin has been explicit about the perception that his style shortens careers and invites injury, responding to long-running commentary about his longevity by saying;

People said I wouldn’t be able to walk when I’m 30, and I’m like 30 right now. Everybody keeps upping the age. OK, he made it to 30, so "he’s not going to be able to walk when he’s 35". Then, when he's 35, "Oh, he’s not gonna be able to walk til he’s 40". So, they’re just gonna keep pushing it til the day I die.

Allin has stated that he maintains a structured recovery routine to sustain his performance, relying on methods such as meditation, saunas, ice baths and dry-needling to manage the physical toll of his matches while continuing to work a style centered on high-impact stunts and risk-heavy offense.

One of Allin's signature wrestling moves is the "Coffin Drop", a high-risk manoeuvre in which he falls backwards from the top rope or another elevated surface onto his opponent, without looking, in a motion resembling a trust fall. After Sting became his on-screen mentor in AEW, Allin adopted the Scorpion Deathdrop and Scorpion Deathlock as other signature moves.

== Other media ==
Ratsch made various pre-wrestling appearances in media tied to his skateboarding and early performance work. He was featured in several clips aired on the MTV show Ridiculousness, though one video was reportedly rejected by the network for being too extreme to broadcast.

In 2014, Ratsch appeared in an episode of the reality series Sex Sent Me to the ER, which features people recounting their embarrassing sex stories; Ratsch told the story of how he once had sex with a woman in the woods before accidentally rolling onto a bee's nest. In 2020, after becoming successful as a wrestler, he stated that the story was fictional and that he had accepted the role for financial reasons.

In 2021, Ratsch appeared as himself in Rhodes to the Top, a reality television series focused on then-AEW executives Cody and Brandi Rhodes.

As Darby Allin, Ratsch made his video game debut in AEW Fight Forever (2023).

== Personal life ==
Ratsch resides in Atlanta. He lives a straight edge lifestyle. This was influenced by a traumatic incident he experienced at the age of five, in which he survived a car crash caused by his drunk-driving uncle, who died in the accident. He is a close friend and former tag team partner of wrestling veteran Sting, and began training Sting's son, Steven, for a potential wrestling career in 2024. Steven had his first match the following year.

Ratsch was married to fellow wrestler Priscilla Kelly from 2018 until their divorce in 2020. Kelly later stated that they remained on good terms. In August 2025, Ratsch revealed that he is engaged to his girlfriend Sara, who he had previously met in high school on the school bus. They got married in June 2026.

Ratsch developed an interest in mountaineering and announced his plans to climb Mount Everest in 2024, spending much of late 2023 and early 2024 training for the expedition. However, shortly before his scheduled departure, he suffered a broken foot during a match with Jay White and was forced to postpone the climb until 2025. He began his ascent on April 8, 2025, and set the world record for the highest elevation kickflip at 20,958 feet while climbing Mount Everest on May 5. On May 18, he reached the summit of Everest, where he filmed a short video as the Darby Allin character that was used during his return at All In two months later.

On November 1, 2026, Ratsch ran in the 2026 New York Marathon and finished with a time of 5:35:14.

== Championships and accomplishments ==
- All Elite Wrestling
  - AEW World Championship (1 time)
  - AEW TNT Championship (3 times, current)
  - AEW World Tag Team Championship (1 time) – with Sting
  - Royal Rampage (2023, 2024)
  - Dynamite Award for Breakout Star – Male (2021)
- Northeast Wrestling
  - NEW Heavyweight Championship (1 time)
- Pro Wrestling Illustrated
  - Ranked No. 12 of the top 500 singles wrestlers in the PWI 500 in 2026
- Style Battle
  - Style Battle 7 (2017)
- Wrestling Observer Newsletter
  - Non-Heavyweight MVP (2021, 2024)

== Luchas de Apuestas record ==
Winner (wager)	Loser (wager)	Location	Event	Date	Notes
MJF (hair)	Darby Allin (title)	Queens, New York	AEW Double or Nothing	May 24, 2026	
