= Scorpio Sky =

American professional wrestler and mixed martial artist (born 1983)

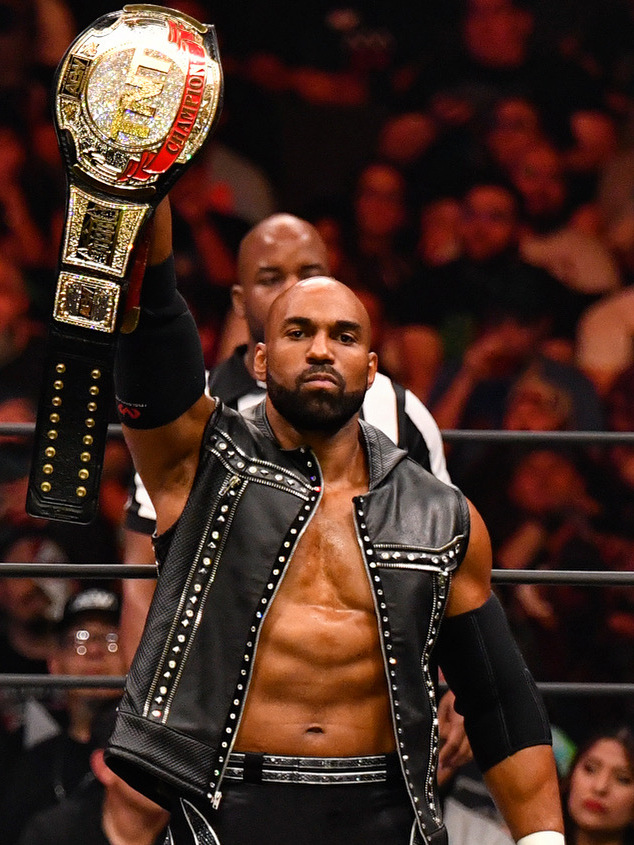
- Sky as the AEW TNT Champion in 2022

Personal information
- Born: Schuyler Andrews; April 2, 1983 (age 43) Los Angeles, California, U.S.

Professional wrestling career
- Ring name(s): Gallinero Tres; Harold; Mason Andrews; Scorpio Sky
- Billed height: 5 ft 10 in (1.78 m)
- Billed weight: 208 lb (94 kg)
- Billed from: Big Bear, California; Los Angeles, California "Beautiful" Southern California
- Trained by: Revolution Pro Rudos Dojo
- Debut: 2002

Schuyler Andrews (born April 2, 1983), better known by the ring name Scorpio Sky, is an American professional wrestler and former mixed martial artist. He is signed to All Elite Wrestling (AEW), where he is a member of SkyFlight. He is a former two-time AEW TNT Champion and one-time AEW World Tag Team Champion.

Andrews is also known for his appearances with Ring of Honor (ROH), Total Nonstop Action Wrestling (TNA), and Pro Wrestling Guerrilla (PWG). In ROH, he and Frankie Kazarian are one-time ROH World Tag Team Champions while he, Kazarian, and Christopher Daniels (known as SoCal Uncensored, or SCU) are one-time ROH World Six-Man Tag Team Champions. Sky joined AEW with Kazarian and Daniels and became one-half of the inaugural AEW World Tag Team Champions with Kazarian. Sky eventually struck out on his own in singles competition, but eventually formed a tag team dubbed "The Men of the Year" with Ethan Page, later picking up a manager in American Top Team's Dan Lambert, which led to Sky's first reign as AEW TNT Champion. He later won back the title for a second time in April 2022.

== Professional wrestling career ==
=== Early career (2002–2003) ===
Andrews took an interest in wrestling at a very young age, idolizing the likes of Bret Hart, Ric Flair, and The Midnight Express. In high school he trained with the wrestling team to gain experience. After graduating, Andrews joined the Revolution Pro Rudos Dojo. He debuted in Revolution Pro in June 2002 as a masked wrestler named Gallinero Tres in a match with Top Gun Talwar. After losing the match he spent the rest of 2002 under the mask from June until November when he re-debuted as Scorpio Sky in the Rudos Dojo "Fight For the Revolution" Battle Royal, a tournament where the winner would receive a Revolution Pro contract. The finals saw Sky face Quicksilver. The match went to a draw and both men were given contracts.

Afterward, Sky and Quicksilver formed a tag team known as the Aerial Xpress (AXP). AXP received a strong push, defeating several other tag teams (such as Super Dragon and TARO) and were named the Southern California Tag Team of the Year for 2003. They also won the 2003 Revolution Pro Tag Team of the Year award. Sky won the 2003 Revolution Pro Wrestling Rookie of the Year award after winning the Revolution Pro Wrestling Junior Heavyweight Title by defeating Super Dragon on August 4, 2003. On October 18 he defeated Lost to become the last man to hold the APW-LA Light Heavyweight Championship and co-owned the Alternative Wrestling Show Tag Team Titles with Quicksilver. Later the APW-LA Lightweight title became the AWS Light Heavyweight Title and Sky was named the first champion. Sky lost the Revolution Pro Junior title to Rising Son in December 2003 in a ladder match. His January 2004 rematch had to be postponed when doctors found he needed emergency surgery, which sidelined him for two months. He regained his title March 6, 2004 and remained champion for 10 months, surviving many title defenses. In the Summer of 2004, Sky and Scott Lost toured for Osaka Pro Wrestling in Japan. On October 16 Scorpio Sky won the Revolution J Tournament, by defeating Super Dragon, Quicksilver and Joey Harder in a 4-way match. In November 2004 he debuted in Combat Zone Wrestling in a "SoCal" match. AXP once again were named the Southern California Tag Team of the Year. In December 2004, Revolution Pro Wrestling held its final show where Sky lost the Revolution Pro Junior Heavyweight title to his partner Quicksilver.

=== Pro Wrestling Guerrilla (2003–2012) ===
Sky joined Pro Wrestling Guerrilla (PWG), a new promotion owned by SoCal wrestlers Super Dragon, Joey Ryan, Disco Machine, Topgun Talwar, Scott Lost and Excalibur. In PWG, Sky and Quicksilver hooked back up with Dino Winwood as their manager to chase the PWG World Tag Team Championship. They received a shot at the champions Arrogance (Chris Bosh and Scott Lost), but were unable to dethrone them. On February 12, 2005, the Aerial Xpress was given a rematch for the PWG Tag Team Title but were once again defeated by Bosh and Lost. Later in June, The AXP defeated Los Luchas (Zokre and Phoenix Star), thus becoming #1 contenders for the PWG tag team title. Bosh and Lost forced through stipulations that if the AXP lost the match, not only would that be their last tag team title opportunity, but they would also be forced to remove their masks. The Masks vs. Title Match took place on July 9, 2005, at 2nd Annual PWG Bicentennial Birthday Extravaganza: Night One. Quicksilver was taken out of the match due to injury after Bosh hit him with a chair leaving Sky alone. Though outnumbered, Sky was able to roll up Lost for a three count. The match was named the Southern California Match of the Year for 2005. Despite the victory, Sky was assaulted after the match by Lost, Bosh, and "The Technical Wizard" Joey Ryan. The three bloodied Scorpio and removed his mask.

The next night Sky did not show up for a title defense and the Aerial Xpress were forced to vacate the title, and the team split. This led to Sky's "Disappearance To Africa" angle. Sky was seemingly out of the wrestling business, but finally made his return in September, without a mask, to attack Scott Lost after his match with Christopher Daniels at PWG's Battle of Los Angeles tournament. This led to a bitter feud between Sky and Lost ending with an "I Quit Match" in December, in which Sky was victorious.

Sky started 2006 on the sidelines with a knee injury. In February he returned and toured Germany and England on PWG's "European Vacation" shows. When they returned to the states Sky feuded with the Human Tornado. During this feud Sky broke Tornado's ankle in a match taking place in Las Vegas. Tornado's then manager Jade Chung turned on him and formed an alliance with Sky. The self-proclaimed "Scorpio Sky Experience" became hated by the fans quickly, and helped Sky climb to the top of PWG, defeating the likes of Kevin Steen, Chris Hero, Homicide and Human Tornado. Sky then went on to form a stable known as The Dynasty, consisting of himself, Jade Chung, Joey Ryan, Chris Bosh and Scott Lost.

It was at this time the rivalry between Sky and Frankie Kazarian began, after Sky assaulted Frankie after a match and cut his hair on May 6, 2006. In June, Sky toured in Europe, performing shows for 1PW, IPW, and Lucha VaVoom in England and the Netherlands. He competed in PWG's Battle of Los Angeles 2006 tournament on September 2, but was eliminated by Kazarian via disqualification after Jade Chung's interference. After Sky, Chris Bosh and Scott Lost defeated Kazarian and his tag team partners Chris Sabin and Alex Shelley, Frankie had enough and challenged Scorpio to a "Loser Leaves PWG" match which was to take place in January. On January 13, 2007, Scorpio Sky lost a "Loser Leaves PWG" match to Kazarian, ending their nine-month-long feud and forcing Scorpio out of PWG.

Soon after, The Dynasty seemingly brought Scorpio Sky back to PWG, but it was actually an impostor Sky who was noticeably smaller than the original. The real Sky eventually came into the ring out of the crowd and beat the fake Scorpio Sky out of the building. In the summer of 2007, Sky and Joey Ryan feuded, ending with Sky defeating Joey Ryan and thus winning his reinstatement back into PWG. In October Sky made his official return to PWG teaming with The Young Bucks (Nick and Matt Jackson) to defeat Los Luchas (Zokre, Phoenix Star and Nemesis) in a 6-man tag. He then defeated Ronin at All Star Weekend 6 before teaming with him in a Round Robin Tournament defeating Los Luchas in the first round.

On July 30, 2010, Scorpio Sky made his return to Pro Wrestling Guerrilla to compete against Scott Lost in Lost's retirement match. Sky defeated Lost after hitting him with his own "Big Fat Kill" finishing move. After the match they shook hands and bid goodbye to the fans. During the summer of 2011, Sky once again began regularly working for PWG, reforming the Dynasty with Joey Ryan. On August 20, Sky and Ryan defeated the RockNES Monsters (Johnny Goodtime and Johnny Yuma) to become the number one contenders to the PWG World Tag Team Championship. On September 10, Sky and Ryan failed to capture the PWG World Tag Team Championship from The Young Bucks. Sky's final PWG appearance came on December 1, 2012, when he defeated Joey Ryan in a singles match.

=== Wrestling Society X (2006–2007) ===
Sky participated in MTV's Wrestling Society X (WSX). In WSX, Sky had the gimmick of being "the best athlete in history...of Montclair High" and carried around two plaques that were awards he had won. He competed against the likes of Matt Sydal, Jack Evans, and 6-Pac. The show was not picked up for a second season.

=== Other promotions (2007–2019) ===
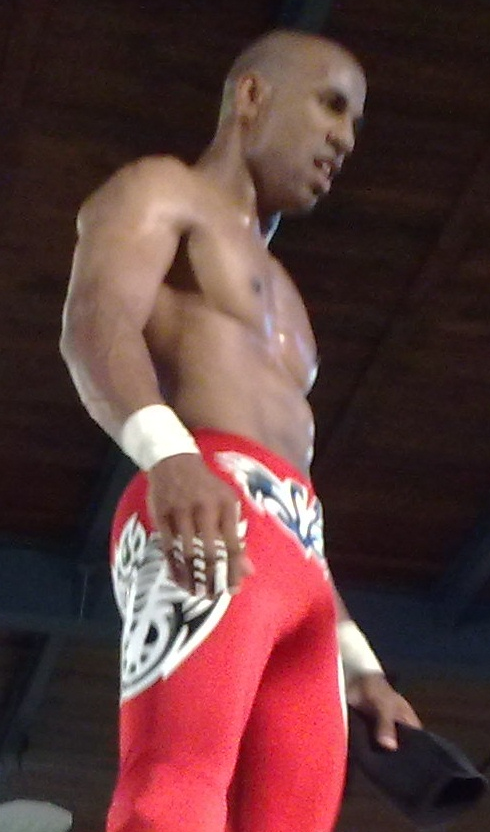
Scorpio Sky in 2008.

Sky began working regularly for the Empire Wrestling Federation (EWF) in 2007, quickly making waves in the Inland Title Series Tournament. He defeated JT Blackstar and Ryan Taylor to advance to the finals where he lost to Brandon Gatson. The match was nominated for the 2007 Match of the Year. Early in the year 2008, Sky chased for the EWF Heavyweight Championship held by Gatson. After defeating Dan Kobrick in a singles match he competed in a 4-way with Korbick, Bino Gambino and Gatson for the title. He was unsuccessful in winning being eliminated by Kobrick after a superkick from Gatson. Scorpio Sky then earned a shot at Gatson's Heavyweight Title after defeating Dan "The Man" Kobrick and Terex in a #1 contender's three-way dance. After the match, Gatson went out to congratulate Sky and then leveled him with a superkick. Their match at the 12th Anniversary Extravaganza was one of the most hyped matches in the history of the EWF and held the rare distinction of being scheduled for 2 out of 3 falls. In another match of the year candidate, Scorpio Sky went on the defeat Gatson 2 falls to 1 and become the EWF Heavyweight Champion on May 2, 2008.

Later that month on May 31 he defeated Lil Cholo and Karl Anderson in the AWS promotion to win the AWS Heavyweight Title, again becoming a double champion and being dubbed the "King of SoCal". Sky successfully defended his EWF Heavyweight title 11 times over the summer defeating the likes of Ryan Taylor, Scott Lost and Joey Ryan in the process. On August 16 Sky lost the AWS heavyweight title to Scott Lost. Days later it was announced that he had suffered a serious back injury leading to him relinquishing the EWF heavyweight title on August 22. On April 26, 2009, Sky defeated Johnny Paradise to become #1 Contender for the AWS Heavyweight title. He faced Scott Lost for the title on May 17 but was unsuccessful due to a double count-out finish. On July 10, 2009, Sky defeated nine other men in a cash out match to become the first EWA Champion. On August 22 at XPW's 10 Year Anniversary Show Sky and Luke Hawx won the XPW World Tag Team Titles by defeating Matt Cross and Tool. On June 19, 2010, Sky won the world record 159 man battle royal in AWS.

In 2011, it was revealed that Sky would take part in a new hiphop/pro wrestling collaboration, the Urban Wrestling Federation, with taping of the first event "First Blood" taking place on June 3.

On January 7, 2016, Scorpio Sky competed on the debut PCW (Pacific Coast Wrestling) show in Torrance, California defeating TJ Perkins in the semi-main event. He defeated Kenny King at their second show on March 26, 2016. On May 6, 2016, Scorpio Sky defeated Frankie Kazarian at the EWF 20th anniversary show.

On October 16, 2016, Scorpio Sky defeated DJ Zema Ion, Ricky Starks and Aaron Solow in a Fatal 4-Way for the Sideshow Championship at the inaugural WrestleCircus debut show.

Sky held the Sideshow title until early 2017 when he was pinned by Leva Bates. Sky then defeated Michael Elgin, Brody King, Mr. 450, and Andy Daulton en route to challenging Cody Rhodes for the ROH World title at Wrestle Circus "Cody Rhodes Summer Show". Cody pinned Sky after hitting Cross Rhodes onto a pile of thumbtacks. At the one-year anniversary show, CircusMania Sky pinned Sammy Guevara after hitting the Ace of Spades.

=== Championship Wrestling From Hollywood (2010–2017) ===
On September 17, 2010, the Hollywood-based NWA territory launched a weekly television show on KDOC. Sky's first appearance on "NWA Championship Wrestling From Hollywood" came on October 8, 2010, challenging Adam Pearce for the NWA World Heavyweight title. He came very close to winning but Pearce used a low blow followed by a piledriver to secure the victory. After the match, Rocky Romero & Claudio Castagnoli attacked Sky from behind. Joey Ryan and Willie Mack came to Sky's aid leading to a 6-Man tag match on October 22. Joey Ryan, Willie Mack, and Scorpio Sky were successful. Sky's next appearance came in a losing effort to former partner Joey Ryan in a one on one matchup on November 5.

On the December 3rd edition, Sky was seen laid out in the dressing room from an attack. On December 10, Sky faced and defeated "Pretty" Peter Avalon. On the January 7th edition Sky defeated Austin Aries in a 1 on 1 match. Soon after it was announced that the Sky/Aries rivalry would continue in a Best of 5 Series of matches. The second match between the 2 took place on February 4; Aries was the winner injuring Scorpio Sky's knee in the process. Two weeks later Aries & NWA World Heavyweight Champion Adam Pearce defeated Sky & Joey Ryan in a tag team match on February 18. Sky got his revenge on March 12 when he defeated Aries in Match 3 of their series; pinning him after a vicious knee strike to the face. Aries wouldn't stay down long as he defeated Sky on March 18 in Match 4, giving him a concussion with a series of blows to the head. The 5th and final match in the series took place on May 7. Sky forced Aries to tap out to a figure 8 like submission hold but refused to release it after the match ended. The referee was forced to disqualify Sky and reverse the decision.

On July 2 Sky defeated Peter Avalon in the 1st round of the "Be A Star" Television title tournament. On July 30 he defeated James Morgan in the 2nd round. Finally, on July 10, 2011, Sky pinned So Cal Crazy after hitting the "Ace of Spades" to win the tournament and become NWA Hollywood's first Television champion. Sky's first title defense came on September 17 when he defeated Ray Rosas. He once again defended his title on October 22 against Willie Mack. Despite Mack coming very close, Sky was able to pick up the victory after delivering the Ace of Spades. Shortly after Sky assembled a stable known as "The Experience" with strength coach Big Duke and agent Xtian Cole. The Experience would often be escorted to the ring by women and begin every match with a ring girl circling the ring with an "Experience" placard. On 12 May 2012, NWA Hollywood ran its first non-TV event in its history, with Scorpio Sky defending the Television Championship against Nick Madrid as it main event. Sky defended the Television title 3 more times before his year-long title run ended losing it to Willie Mack on July 22, 2012. He was unsuccessful in the rematch losing via pinfall. Sky defeated Johnny Yuma, Peter Avalon, and Ray Rosas in a 4-way qualifier to earn another shot at Mack's Television title in a ladder match. Sky lost the final match.

On May 5, 2013, Sky was the last man eliminated in the finals of the Red Carpet Rumble to crown the first ever CWFH Heritage Heavyweight Champion by Shaun Ricker. He defeated Ricker in a rematch at the tapings later on that night to win the Heritage title, but the match was never aired due to the controversial finish. On November 3, 2013, Scorpio defeated Matt Striker to retain the title. On January 12, 2014, Sky lost the title to Ricky Mandel. He returned on September 14, 2014, attacking Vermin. On September 28, 2014, he teamed with Big Duke to defeat Vermin's Johnny Yuma & Johnny Goodtime via disqualification. Sky spent the first half of 2015 feuding with Vermin defeating Ryan Taylor for the Television title on January 25, 2015, then losing it to Kevin Martenson on March 22, 2015. Sky challenged Yuma for the Heritage title at the Red Carpet Rumble in July but was defeated. On April 10, 2016, Scorpio Sky was the special referee in the Heritage title match between Peter Avalon and Sasha Derevko.

Sky made a full time return even defeating Heritage champion Peter Avalon in a non-title match to secure a shot at the 2016 Red Carpet Rumble. Despite coming close many times Sky was unsuccessful in defeating Avalon. In September 2016 at Milestone Sky pinned Willie Mack after a knee strike to secure the victory. He then chased Bateman for the television title finally capturing it for a record third time in early 2017. Sky successfully defended the title against David Starr at CZW in April and then defeat Ricky Mandel at Coastline Clash. His reign came to an end when the returning Rocky Romero defeated Sky in an open door challenge. The rematch took place at the 2017 Red Carpet Rumble. The match was declared a no-contest when both men battled on the outside of the ring knocking down referees and announcing table equipment.

=== WWE (2012–2013) ===
On the August 27, 2012, episode of WWE Raw, Andrews played a character known as "Harold" in one of Daniel Bryan's anger management classes that also involved Kane. He also appeared the following week, again as Harold, as Kane and Daniel Bryan continued with their anger management. In December 2012, WWE publicly severed its ties with Andrews after Andrews allegedly made anti-gay comments on Twitter. Andrews made another appearance for WWE at SummerSlam 2013, posing as a firefighter during the "Ring of Fire" match between Kane and Bray Wyatt.

=== Total Nonstop Action Wrestling (2012–2013) ===
On June 28, 2012, Andrews, working under the ring name Mason Andrews, made his debut for Total Nonstop Action Wrestling (TNA), losing to Rashad Cameron in a TNA X Division Championship tournament qualifying match on Impact Wrestling. On July 8 at Destination X, Andrews defeated Dakota Darsow, Lars Only and Rubix in a Last Chance match to earn his way back into the tournament. He then defeated Kid Kash immediately afterwards to qualify for the finals of the tournament. Later that same night, Andrews was defeated by Zema Ion in the final Ultimate X match, which also included Kenny King and Sonjay Dutt. Andrews returned to TNA on January 12, 2013, to take part in TNA X-Travaganza, wrestling in an Ultimate X match, which was won by Kenny King and also included Rubix and Zema Ion.

Mason Andrews returned again on April 4, 2013, edition of TNA Impact to compete in a No. 1 contender X Division match against Petey Williams and Sonjay Dutt, which was eventually won by Petey Williams. Sky has since parted ways with TNA.

=== Ring of Honor (2010, 2017–2018) ===
Sky made his Ring of Honor (ROH) debut on January 29, 2010, during the WrestleReunion 4 weekend, teaming up with Scott Lost in a losing effort against Colt Cabana and El Generico. He once again competed with ROH on March 26 & 27 again teaming with Scott Lost to face the Kings of Wrestling and Kenny King respectively.

Sky made his return to the promotion on September 29, 2017, and unsuccessfully challenged Cody for the ROH World Championship. On October 14, Sky faced Kushida, The match ended in a no contest after Christopher Daniels and Frankie Kazarian attacked both men. However, Sky later formed SoCal Uncensored alongside Daniels and Kazarian. On November 12 at Survival Of The Fittest, Sky unsuccessfully challenged Kenny King for the ROH World Television Championship.

On March 9, 2018, at the ROH 16th Anniversary Show, SoCal Uncensored defeated The Hung Bucks to win the ROH World Six-Man Tag Team Championship. At War of the Worlds: Lowell, they lost the Six-Man Tag Team Title to The Kingdom. On July 20 at Honor For All, Sky unsuccessfully challenged Punishment Martinez for the ROH World Television Championship. On October 14, 2018, Sky and Kazarian defeated The Briscoe Brothers to win the ROH World Tag Team Championship. However, they lost the titles back to The Briscoe Brothers at Final Battle in a Ladder War. The next day, SoCal Uncensored left ROH.

=== New Japan Pro-Wrestling (2018–2019) ===
On March 4, 2018, it was announced that Scorpio Sky would be serving as assistant trainer of the New Japan Los Angeles Dojo. Sky made his in-ring debut at the promotion at Strong Style Saturday on March 24 defeating Rocky Romero.

=== All Elite Wrestling / Return to ROH (2019–present) ===
==== SoCal Uncensored (2019–2020) ====
On January 8, 2019, it was announced that Scorpio Sky, along with Christopher Daniels and Frankie Kazarian of SoCal Uncensored, would be signing with All Elite Wrestling (AEW), a new wrestling promotion started by wrestlers Cody Rhodes, Kenny Omega, and The Young Bucks (Matt Jackson and Nick Jackson). He and Kazarian were crowned the first-ever AEW World Tag Team Champions after winning a tournament final against the Lucha Brothers (Pentagón Jr. and Fénix) on the October 30, 2019 episode of Dynamite, thus making him the first African-American champion in AEW. In their first defense of the championship, Sky and Kazarian defeated both the Lucha Brothers and Private Party at Full Gear on November 9, 2019.

On the November 13 episode of Dynamite, Sky and Kazarian successfully defended the World Tag Team Championship against The Inner Circle members Chris Jericho and Sammy Guevara which culminated with Sky becoming the first wrestler in AEW to pin Jericho. This earned Sky a title shot at Jericho's AEW World Championship on the Thanksgiving Eve special episode on November 27, which Sky lost. Sky and Kazarian lost the World Tag Team Championship to Kenny Omega and "Hangman" Adam Page at Chris Jericho's Rock 'N' Wrestling Rager at Sea Part Deux: Second Wave in January 2020. Since then, Sky turned to singles competition while his SoCal Uncensored stablemates, Christopher Daniels and Frankie Kazarian focused on tag team competition.

After picking up a number of wins on Dark, Sky earned a match for the AEW TNT Championship against Cody on the August 12, 2020 edition of Dynamite, which Cody won.

==== Men of the Year and TNT Champion (2021–2022) ====
At Revolution, Sky won the Face of the Revolution ladder match to earn a future TNT Championship match. He received the title match on the March 10, 2021 edition of Dynamite, but was defeated by then-champion Darby Allin. After failing to win the title, Sky turned heel after the match by attacking Darby with the heel hook. On the March 29 episode of AEW Dark: Elevation, Sky formed an alliance with Ethan Page. Sky and Page went on to feud with Sting and Darby Allin, culminating in a Tag Team Match at Double or Nothing (which was Sting's first live, in-ring match in over six years), in which Sky and Page were defeated. Sky and Page later formed an alliance with Dan Lambert of American Top Team. After remaining undefeated in singles matches for a year, Sky defeated Sammy Guevara and won the TNT Championship on the March 9, 2022 episode of Dynamite. On the March 16 episode of Dynamite, Sky successfully defended title defense against Wardlow, but lost the title back to Guevara at Battle of the Belts II. He regained it two weeks later on the April 27, 2022, episode of Dynamite after defeating Guevara in a ladder match. On the May 13, 2022 episode of AEW Rampage, Sky successfully defended the title against Frankie Kazarian following interference from Page and Lambert. On the May 27, 2022 episode of Rampage, Sky received a custom design TNT Championship belt in the colors of his hometown team, the Los Angeles Lakers. At Double or Nothing on May 29, 2022, Sky, Paige Van Zandt and Ethan Page defeated Guevara, Kazarian and Tay Conti at in a six-person tag team match after Sky pinned Kazarian, with Guevara and Kazarian losing the right to challenge Sky for the TNT Championship as a result. On the July 6 episode of Dynamite, Wardlow defeated Scorpio Sky in a street fight match to win the TNT Championship.

==== Hiatuses; SkyFlight (2023–present) ====
Sky returned after over a year off of television as a face on the July 8, 2023 episode of Collision, defeating Action Andretti. Sky returned to ROH on the September 28 edition of Ring of Honor Wrestling by defeating Tony Nese. At Final Battle, Sky helped his former tag team partner Ethan Page against Nese and Mark Sterling. Sky would continue to wrestle sporadically on ROH, defeating the likes of Fred Rosser and Darius Martin. On the August 17, 2024 episode of Rampage, Sky appeared in a backstage segment with Private Party.

On July 5, 2025, at Collision 100, Sky returned after nearly a year off television, accepting and defeating Max Caster in his open challenge. Sky would also form an alliance with Top Flight (Dante Martin, Darius Martin, and Leila Grey) and his former SoCal Uncensored stablemate Christopher Daniels. The following week, the alliance was given the name "SkyFlight".

== Mixed martial arts career ==
Schuyler Andrews
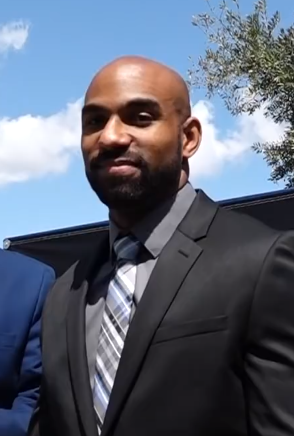
- Born: Los Angeles, California, United States
- Nationality: American
- Height: 5 ft 10 in (178 cm)
- Weight: 170 lb (77 kg; 12 st 2 lb)
- Division: Welterweight
- Team: The Guild
- Trainer: Liron Wilson (Head Coach); Saul Ma
- Wrestling: Freestyle
- Years active: 2014–2015

Mixed martial arts record
- Total: 3
- Wins: 2
- By knockout: 2
- Losses: 1
- By decision: 1

Other information
- Mixed martial arts record from Sherdog

On August 28, 2011, Andrews made his mixed martial arts debut, defeating Jason Bell in the third round via referee stoppage due to strikes from the mount.

On August 24, 2014, Andrews returned to the cage and defeated Jose Jovel at University of MMA "Fight Night 8" at 1 minute 57 seconds of the first round by submission via arm bar.

On October 12, 2014, Andrews defeated James Hershey via second-round TKO (punches) at Mansion Fights 20.

On March 8, 2015, Andrews suffered his first loss to Lance Bush via split decision at University of MMA Fight Night 9.

On June 6, 2015, Andrews competed in and won a 4-man muay thai kickboxing tournament.

=== Mixed martial arts record ===
Professional record breakdown
3 matches	2 wins	1 loss
By knockout	1	0
By submission	1	0
By decision	0	1

Res.	Record	Opponent	Method	Event	Date	Round	Time	Location	Notes
Loss	2–1	Lance Bush	Decision (split)	University of MMA: Fight Night 9	March 8, 2015	3	2:00	Los Angeles, California, United States	
Win	2–0	James Hershey	TKO (punches)	Mansion Fights 20	October 12, 2014	2	1:03	Ontario, California, United States	
Win	1–0	Jose Jovel	Submission (armbar)	University of MMA: Fight Night 8	August 24, 2014	1	1:57	Los Angeles, California, United States	

Amateur record breakdown		
1 match	1 win	0 losses
By knockout	1	0

Res.	Record	Opponent	Method	Event	Date	Round	Time	Location	Notes
Win	1–0	Jason Bell	TKO (mounted strikes)		August 28, 2011	3			

== Personal life ==
After graduating from high school, Andrews considered enlisting in the United States Army, but instead opted to go to college. He dropped out in his freshman year and started training to become a professional wrestler.

Andrews's favorite wrestlers are Bret Hart, Shawn Michaels, and Kurt Angle. He also cites boxers Muhammad Ali and Floyd Mayweather Jr. as inspirations for his in-ring persona.

Andrews is a supporter of the NBA's Los Angeles Lakers.

Andrew is currently working for BlackTie Breaks on TikTok.

== Championships and accomplishments ==
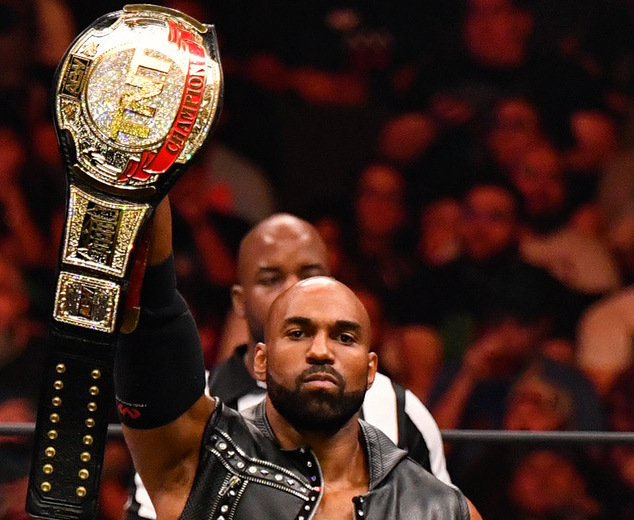
Sky is a two-time AEW TNT Champion

- Adenaline Unleashed
  - Adenaline Unleashed Championship (1 time)
- All Elite Wrestling
  - AEW TNT Championship (2 times)
  - AEW World Tag Team Championship (1 time, inaugural) – with Frankie Kazarian
  - AEW World Tag Team Championship Tournament (2019)
  - Face of the Revolution Ladder Match (2021)
- All Pro Wrestling (Los Angeles)
  - APW-LA Lightweight Championship (1 time)
- Alternative Wrestling Show
  - AWS Heavyweight Championship (2 times)
  - AWS Light Heavyweight Championship (2 times)
  - AWS Tag Team Championship (2 times) – with Quicksilver
- Alpha Omega Wrestling
  - AOW Heavyweight Championship (1 time)
- Bar Wrestling
  - Trios Tournament (2019) – with Frankie Kazarian and Christopher Daniels
- Championship Wrestling from Hollywood
  - Be The Star Television Tournament (2011)
  - CWFH Heritage Heavyweight Championship (1 time)
  - MAV Television Championship/UWN Television Championship (5 times)
- Enterprise Wrestling Association
  - EWA Heavyweight Championship (1 time)
- Empire Wrestling Federation
  - EWF Heavyweight Championship (1 time)
  - EWF Wrestler of the Year (2009)
- Pro Wrestling Guerrilla
  - PWG Tag Team Championship (1 time) – with Quicksilver
- Pro Wrestling Illustrated
  - Ranked No. 38 of the top 500 singles wrestlers in the PWI 500 in 2022
- Revolution Pro Wrestling
  - RPW Junior Heavyweight Championship (2 times)
  - Revolution J Tournament (2004)
  - Revolution Pro Rookie of the Year (2003)
  - Revolution Pro Tag Team of the Year (2003) with Quicksilver
- Ring of Honor
  - ROH World Tag Team Championship (1 time) – with Frankie Kazarian
  - ROH World Six-Man Tag Team Championship (1 time) – with Christopher Daniels and Frankie Kazarian
- SoCal Uncensored
  - Match of the Year (2005) with Quicksilver vs. Chris Bosh and Scott Lost, July 9, 2005, The 2nd Annual PWG Bicentennial Birthday Extravaganza - Night One
  - Most Outstanding Wrestler (2011, 2013)
  - Tag Team of the Year (2003, 2004) with Quicksilver
- WrestleCircus
  - WC Ringmaster Championship (1 time, final)
  - WC Sideshow Championship (1 time)
- Xtreme Pro Wrestling
  - XPW World Tag Team Championship (1 time, final) – with Luke Hawx
- Other accomplishments
  - Jesse Hernandez Award (2008)
