= Full Gear (2020) =

All Elite Wrestling pay-per-view event

- Promotional poster featuring various AEW wrestlers
- Promotion: All Elite Wrestling
- Date: November 7, 2020
- City: Jacksonville, Florida; Cameron, North Carolina (Note: The Elite Deletion Match between Matt Hardy and Sammy Guevara was taped a week prior to the event at Hardy's home, The Hardy Compound, located in Cameron, North Carolina.)
- Venue: Daily's Place
- Attendance: 1,000
- Buy rate: 100,000
- Tagline: Don’t Chase Dreams ... Hunt Goals

Pay-per-view chronology
← Previous; All Out	Next → Revolution

Full Gear chronology
← Previous; 2019	Next → 2021

The 2020 Full Gear was the second annual Full Gear professional wrestling pay-per-view (PPV) event produced by All Elite Wrestling (AEW). It was broadcast on November 7, 2020. While the majority of the event aired live from Daily's Place in Jacksonville, Florida, the Elite Deletion match was taped one week prior at Matt Hardy's home, The Hardy Compound, in Cameron, North Carolina. The event aired through traditional PPV outlets, as well as on B/R Live in North America and FITE TV internationally.

Nine matches were contested at the event, including one on The Buy In pre-show. In the main event, Jon Moxley defeated Eddie Kingston in a "I quit" match to retain the AEW World Championship. In other prominent matches, The Young Bucks (Matt Jackson and Nick Jackson) defeated FTR (Cash Wheeler and Dax Harwood) to win the AEW World Tag Team Championship, Hikaru Shida defeated Nyla Rose to retain the AEW Women's World Championship, Darby Allin defeated Cody Rhodes to win the AEW TNT Championship, and Kenny Omega defeated "Hangman" Adam Page in the AEW World Championship Eliminator Tournament final match in the opening bout.

== Production ==
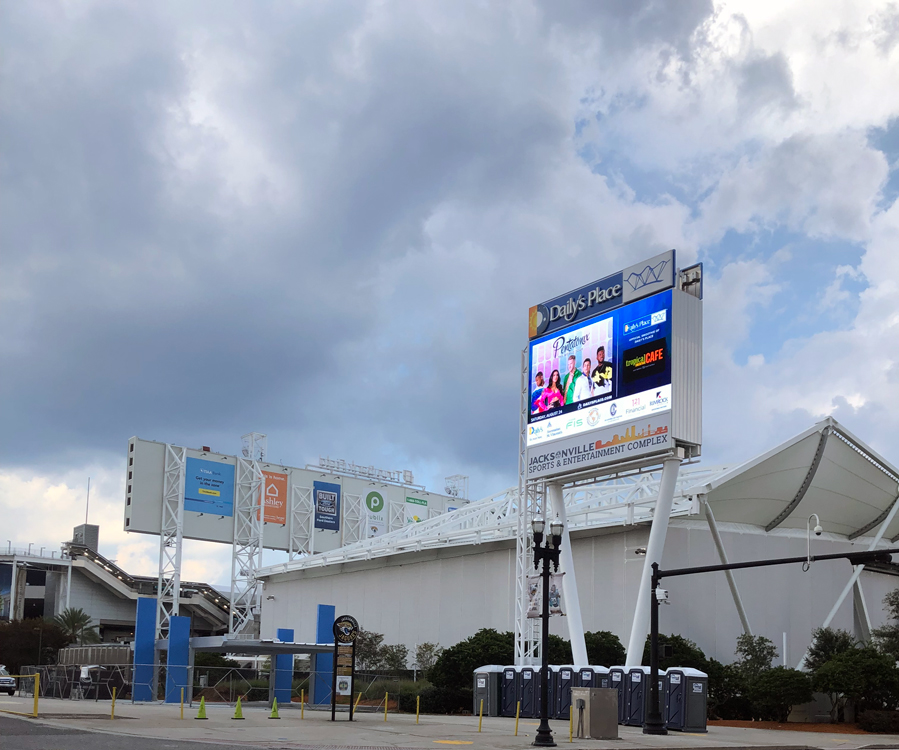
Due to the COVID-19 pandemic, the majority of the event was held at Daily's Place in Jacksonville, Florida.

=== Background ===
On November 9, 2019, the American professional wrestling promotion All Elite Wrestling (AEW) held a pay-per-view (PPV) event entitled Full Gear. During All Out on September 5, 2020, the promotion announced that Full Gear would return on Saturday, November 7 that year, thus establishing Full Gear as an annual pay-per-view for AEW. Due to the ongoing COVID-19 pandemic, the event was held at the promotion's home venue of Daily's Place in Jacksonville, Florida. On November 6, the day before Full Gear, TNT aired a one-hour television special previewing the event called Countdown to Full Gear, which averaged 245,000 viewers.

=== Storylines ===
Full Gear featured professional wrestling matches that involved different wrestlers from pre-existing scripted feuds and storylines. Storylines were produced on AEW's weekly television program, Dynamite, the supplementary online streaming show, Dark, and The Young Bucks' YouTube series Being The Elite.

On the September 23 episode of Dynamite, Jon Moxley retained the AEW World Championship over Eddie Kingston by making him pass out to a chokehold. On the October 14 episode, Kingston attacked Moxley after the latter's match with Lance Archer, proclaiming that he had never tapped out. The following week, Moxley was scheduled to defend the title against Kingston in an "I quit" match at Full Gear.

On the September 30 episode of Dynamite, it was announced that there would be an eight-man single-elimination tournament culminating at Full Gear with the winner receiving a future AEW World Championship match. Jungle Boy, Rey Fenix, Kenny Omega, Wardlow, Colt Cabana, Adam Page, Joey Janela, and Penta El Zero M were announced as participants. The tournament occurred over the following month with former tag team partners Omega and Page advancing to the final at Full Gear.

A four-way tag team match was scheduled for the October 14 episode of Dynamite, with the winning team challenging FTR (Dax Harwood and Cash Wheeler) for the AEW World Tag Team Championship at Full Gear. The four teams were picked at random, and were Private Party (Isiah Kassidy and Marq Quen), Alex Reynolds and John Silver of The Dark Order, The Butcher and The Blade, and The Young Bucks (Matt Jackson and Nick Jackson). The match was won by The Young Bucks. In a promo on the October 28 episode, The Young Bucks said that if they did not win at Full Gear, they would never challenge for the title again.

After Cody wrestled Orange Cassidy to a time limit draw and retained the TNT Championship on the October 14 episode of Dynamite, it was announced that Darby Allin would challenge for the title at Full Gear. Before Full Gear, Cody had a title rematch with Cassidy in a lumberjack match on the October 28 Dynamite, which Cody won, keeping him as the defending champion against Allin.

After Matt Hardy defeated Sammy Guevara in a Broken Rules match at All Out, Hardy took time off until he was cleared to return, due to an injury sustained during the match. He reunited with Private Party (Isiah Kassidy and Marq Quen) as their manager, but was attacked backstage before their match on the September 16 episode of Dynamite. The attacker was later revealed as Guevara and "The Elite Deletion" match was announced, which took place at The Hardy Compound in Cameron, North Carolina as a cinematic match.

On July 15, at Fight for the Fallen, Nyla Rose revealed Vickie Guerrero as her manager. After Rose's match on the October 13 episode of Dark, the duo known as "The Vicious Vixens", challenged Hikaru Shida to an AEW Women's World Championship match. On the October 28 episode of Dynamite, Shida accepted the challenge and the match was officially announced.

MJF, who originally wanted to join Chris Jericho's stable The Inner Circle on November 13, 2019, looked to join a stable after unsuccessfully challenging for Jon Moxley's AEW World Championship at All Out. MJF invited Jericho to "Le Dinner Debonair", a steak dinner where they performed "Me and My Shadow", during which Jericho announced that The Inner Circle would hold a Town Hall meeting to decide whether MJF should join the group. After several questions from Eric Bischoff and others, Jericho brought up that MJF has never beaten him and would give him a match at Full Gear, allowing MJF to join the group if he wins.

== Event ==
Other on-screen personnel
Role	Name
Commentators	Jim Ross (PPV)
Commentators	Excalibur (Pre-show and PPV)
Commentators	Tony Schiavone (Pre-show and PPV)
Commentators	Don Callis (Omega vs. Page)
Spanish commentators	Alex Abrahantes
Spanish commentators	Dasha Gonzalez
Spanish commentators	Willie Urbina
German commentators	Günter Zapf
German commentators	Mike Ritter
French commentators	Alain Mistrangélo
French commentators	Norbert Feuillan
Ring announcer	Justin Roberts
Referees	Aubrey Edwards
Referees	Bryce Remsburg
Referees	Frank Gastineau
Referees	Mike Chioda
Referees	Mike Posey
Referees	Paul Turner
Referees	Rick Knox

=== The Buy-In ===
On The Buy-In pre-show, a match was contested between Allysin Kay and the NWA World Women's Champion Serena Deeb for the NWA World Women's Championship. Deeb retained the title after submitting Kay with the "Serenity Lock". After the match, Deeb was confronted by the former women's champion Thunder Rosa.

=== Preliminary matches ===
The actual pay-per-view opened with the AEW World Championship Eliminator Tournament final match between "Hangman" Adam Page and Kenny Omega, with the winner receiving a future match for the AEW World Championship. Omega performed "One Winged Angel" on Page to win the match.

Next, John Silver faced Orange Cassidy. In the end, Cassidy performed "Beach Break" on Silver to win the match.

After that, Cody (accompanied by Arn Anderson) defended the AEW TNT Championship against Darby Allin. In the end, as both wrestlers tried to roll-up each other to a cover, Allin pinned Cody with a roll-up to win the title.

In the fourth match, Hikaru Shida defended the AEW Women's World Championship against Nyla Rose (accompanied by Vickie Guerrero). Shida retained the title when she pinned Rose after multiple knee strikes.

Next, FTR (Cash Wheeler and Dax Harwood) defended the AEW World Tag Team Championship against The Young Bucks (Matt Jackson and Nick Jackson). If The Young Bucks lost, they would never be able to challenge for the title again. FTR's manager Tully Blanchard was banned from ringside. Matt came into the match with an injured leg, which FTR targeted. Harwood injured his hand by accidentally punching a ring-post, so the Bucks targeted his hand. The teams used various moves that were signatures of the Hart Foundation, the Steiner Brothers, the Hardy Boyz, the Dudleys, and DIY. In the end, Wheeler performed a superkick on Matt, but instead of attempting to pin Matt, Wheeler performed a springboard 450 splash, which missed as Matt dodged. Matt then superkicked Wheeler and pinned him to win the match and the championship.

After that, Matt Hardy faced Sammy Guevara in The Elite Deletion match, which took place in Hardy's Compound. During the match, Gangrel and Hurricane Helms made a surprise appearance, with Gangrel helping Guevara and Helms helping Hardy. In the end, Hardy pinned Guevara after a chair shot to the head to win the match.

In the penultimate match, Chris Jericho faced MJF (accompanied by Wardlow). If MJF won, he would be allowed to join The Inner Circle. In the end, MJF rolled up Jericho to win the match, and joined The Inner Circle afterwards. By extension, Wardlow joined The Inner Ciricle as well.

=== Main event ===
In the main event, Jon Moxley defended the AEW World Championship against Eddie Kingston in an "I quit" match. In the end, Moxley choked Kingston with barbed wire, which made Kingston say "I quit". Thus, Moxley retained the title.

== Reception ==
Despite the previous pay-per-view, Full Gear was met with critical acclaim. Full Gear had a socially-distanced attendance of just over 1,000 people and a $60,000 gate, believed to be the second biggest wrestling crowd since the COVID-19 pandemic began and biggest gate, with approximately 100,000 pay-per-view buys. The event was universally acclaimed by critics and fans, with many calling it the best PPV of 2020, and many praising The Young Bucks–FTR match, which Dave Meltzer of Wrestling Observer Newsletter gave 5.25 stars,. His ratings for the other matches include: 2.5 for Deeb–Kay, 4.5 for Omega–Page, 3.5 for Cassidy–Silver, 4.25 for Allin–Rhodes, 3.25 for Shida–Rose, 3.5 for MJF–Jericho, and 4.25 for Moxley–Kingston. There was no rating for Hardy–Guevara because it was a cinematic match.

Justin Barrasso of Sports Illustrated said the event "surpassed expectations", Omega–Page was "outrageously good", Allin–Rhodes was the "biggest moment of Allin’s career", The Young Bucks–FTR "had a match of the night performance", and Moxley–Kingston was "not for the weak-hearted". Chris Bengel of CBSSports.com said the event "didn't disappoint", the storytelling for MJF–Jericho was "phenomenal", The Young Bucks–FTR was "arguably one of the best matches in quite some time", and Moxley–Kingston was "entertaining". Joseph Staszewski of New York Post said AEW "hit a ton of high notes" at the event, Hardy–Guevara "had its fun moments", The Young Bucks–FTR "delivered a love letter to tag team wrestling in their long-awaited dream match that lived up to all the hype", and Moxley–Kingston was "brutal and at times uncomfortable".

Jason Powell stated that Full Gear "looked like a great show on paper and it mostly lived up to [his] expectations", except for the Hardy–Guevara match. Powell described Bucks–FTR as "a hell of a match", praising the story that "FTR going against their 'no flips, just fists' motto blew up in their faces", and questioned why this match was not the main event.

== Aftermath ==
On the following episode of Dynamite, it was announced that Jon Moxley would defend the AEW World Championship against Kenny Omega on the December 2 episode, titled Winter Is Coming.

== Results ==
No.	Results	Stipulations	Times
1^{P}	Serena Deeb (c) defeated Allysin Kay by submission	Singles match for the NWA World Women's Championship	10:25
2	Kenny Omega defeated "Hangman" Adam Page	AEW World Championship Eliminator Tournament final match Winner received a future AEW World Championship match.	16:25
3	Orange Cassidy defeated John Silver	Singles match	9:40
4	Darby Allin defeated Cody Rhodes (c) (with Arn Anderson)	Singles match for the AEW TNT Championship	17:00
5	Hikaru Shida (c) defeated Nyla Rose (with Vickie Guerrero)	Singles match for the AEW Women's World Championship	14:10
6	The Young Bucks (Matt Jackson and Nick Jackson) defeated FTR (Cash Wheeler and Dax Harwood) (c)	Tag team match for the AEW World Tag Team Championship; Tully Blanchard was barred from ringside. Had The Young Bucks lost, they would have never received another shot at the AEW World Tag Team Championship.	28:35
7	Matt Hardy defeated Sammy Guevara	The Elite Deletion match	19:39
8	MJF (with Wardlow) defeated Chris Jericho	Singles match Since MJF won, he and Wardlow were allowed to join The Inner Circle.	16:10
9	Jon Moxley (c) defeated Eddie Kingston	"I Quit" match for the AEW World Championship	17:35
(c) / – the champion(s) heading into the match; P / – the match was broadcast on the pre-show

=== AEW World Championship Eliminator Tournament ===
Quarterfinals; Dynamite (October 21, 2020)
Penta El Zero M	Forfeit (Note: Rey Fenix initially defeated Penta via pinfall, but injured his neck during the match. As a result of the injury, Fenix was unable to compete and forfeited his victory to Penta, who advanced in his place.)
Rey Fenix	14:00
Kenny Omega	Pin
Sonny Kiss (Note: Sonny Kiss replaced Joey Janela, who was withdrawn from the tournament due to exposure to COVID-19.)	0:25
Colt Cabana	10:50
"Hangman" Adam Page	Pin
Wardlow	Pin
Jungle Boy	8:20

Semifinals; Dynamite (October 28, 2020)
Penta El Zero Miedo	17:15
Kenny Omega	Pin
"Hangman" Adam Page	Pin
Wardlow	9:50

Final; Full Gear (November 7, 2020)
Kenny Omega	Pin
"Hangman" Adam Page	16:25

== See also ==
- 2020 in professional wrestling
- List of All Elite Wrestling pay-per-view events
