= Ortiz (wrestler) =

American-Puerto Rican wrestler (born 1991)

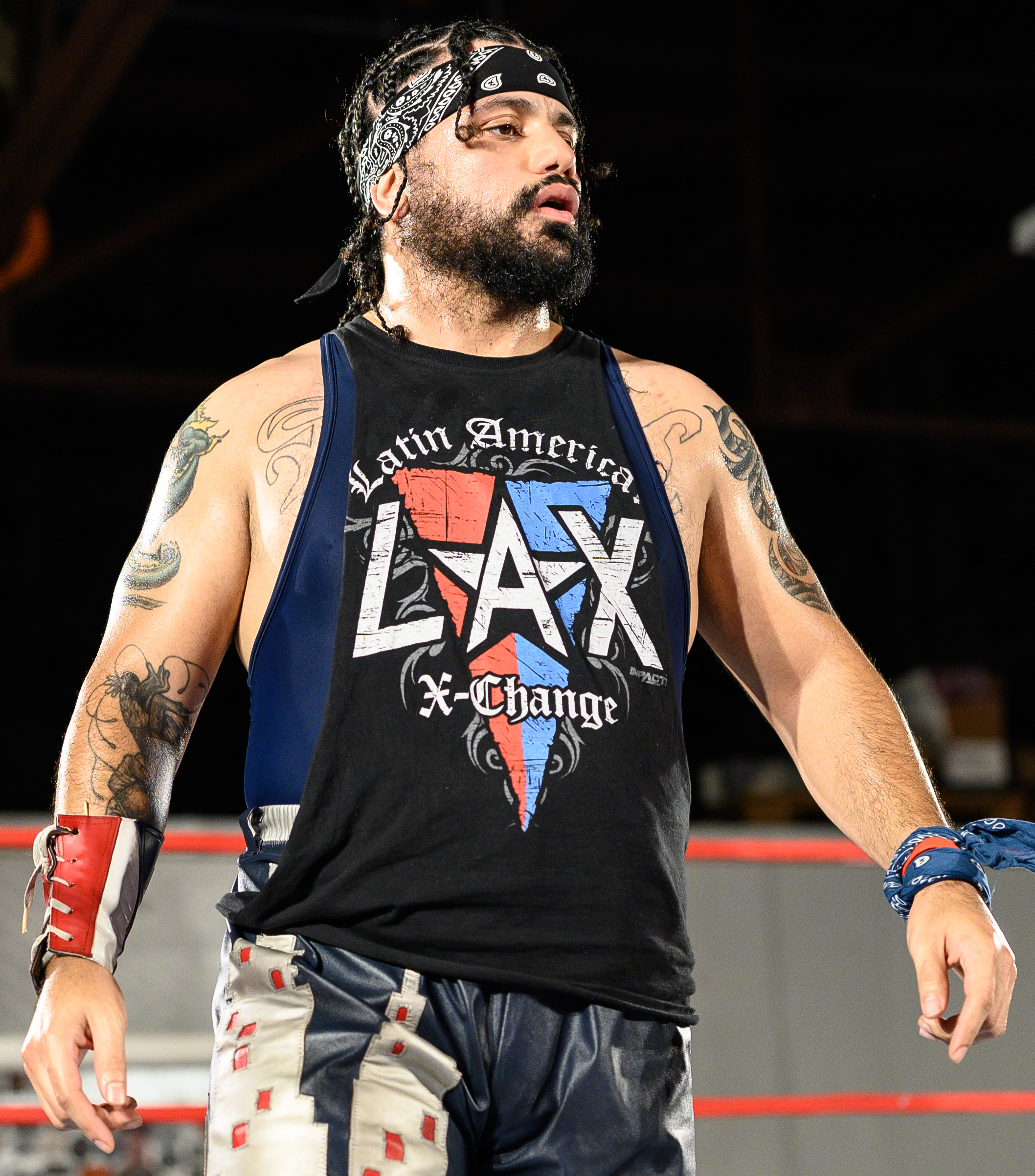
- Ortiz in July 2019

Personal information
- Born: Miguel Molina; September 27, 1991 (age 35) New York City, New York, U.S.

Professional wrestling career
- Ring name(s): Angel Ortiz; Ortiz
- Billed height: 5 ft 8 in (173 cm)
- Billed weight: 191 lb (87 kg)
- Billed from: "Bronx, New York"
- Trained by: Bryan Idol
- Debut: 2008

Miguel Molina (born September 27, 1991), better known by his ring name Ortiz, is an American professional wrestler. He is signed to All Elite Wrestling (AEW), where he is a coach and an in-ring talent. He is also known for his time in Total Nonstop Action Wrestling (TNA).

In 2012, Molina, then known as Angel Ortiz, formed a tag team with Mike Draztik, known as EYFBO and worked on the American independent scene for several years. They won titles such as the AAW Tag Team Championship, CZW World Tag Team Championship and the HOG Tag Team Championship. In 2017, Ortiz and Dratzik were hired by TNA, then known as Impact Wrestling, and they changed their names to Ortiz and Santana respectively. They joined Konnan as the members of the Latin American Xchange (LAX) and won the Impact World Tag Team Championship four times, holding the record for most combined days as champions, with 662 days and, at one point, the record as the longest reign with 261 days. They also won GFW Tag Team Championship and unified the title with the Impact Tag Team Championship. Santana and Ortiz left the promotion in 2019 and soon after joined the newly created All Elite Wrestling, where they joined Chris Jericho's stable The Inner Circle. After Jericho and Jake Hager turned on them, Ortiz and Santana teamed up with Eddie Kingston. The tag team later split, with Santana leaving the promotion.

== Professional wrestling career ==
=== Early career (2008–2017) ===
Molina debuted in 2008 under the ring name "Angel Ortiz". In 2012, he formed a tag team with Mike Draztik, EYFBO; the duo won titles such as the AAW Tag Team Championship, CZW World Tag Team Championship and the HOG Tag Team Championship.

=== Impact Wrestling (2017–2019) ===
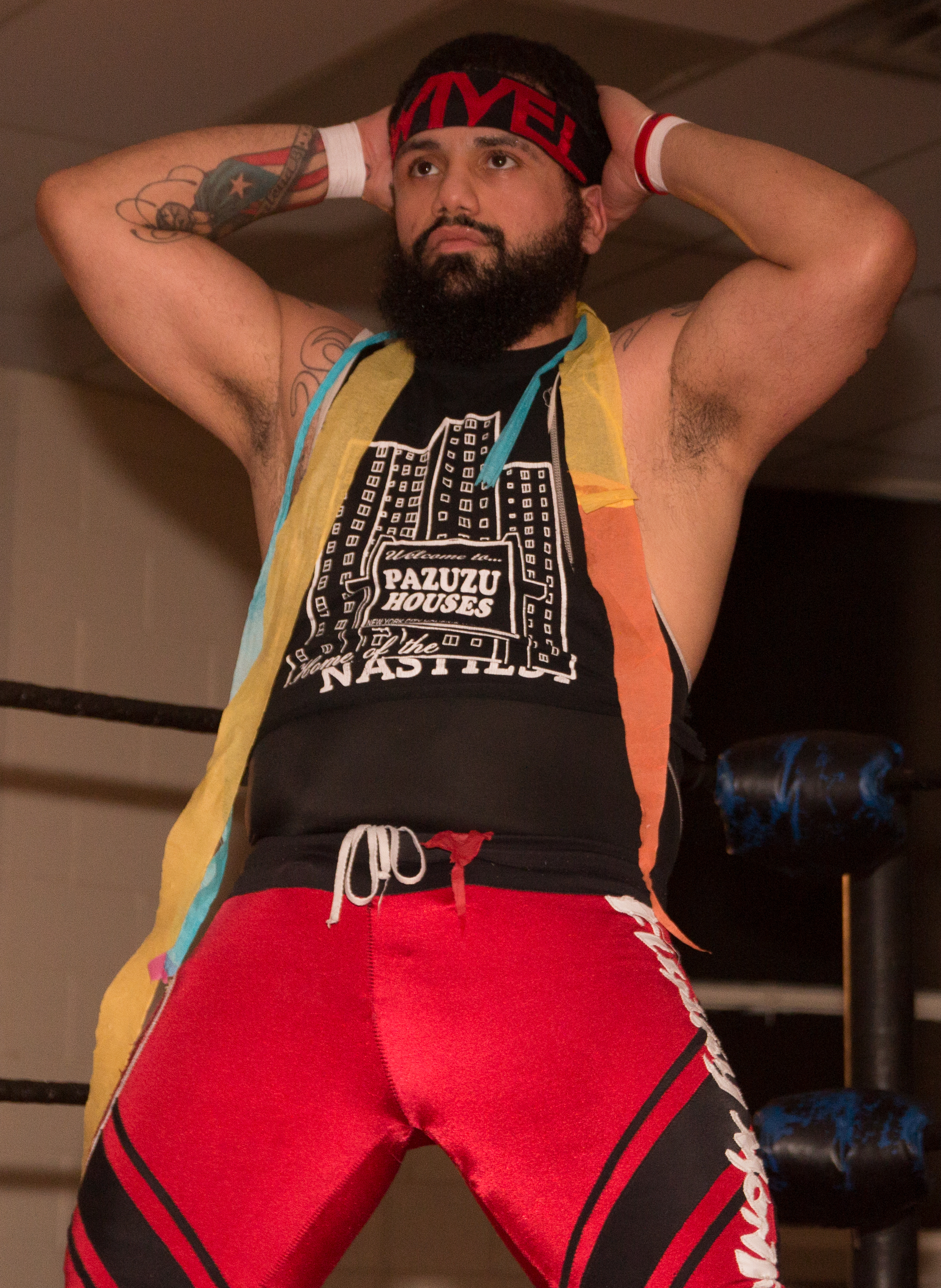
Ortiz in January 2017

On the March 16, 2017 episode of Impact Wrestling, Ortiz and Santana were part of LAX with Homicide, Diamante, and manager Konnan. LAX attacked Decay, Laredo Kid, Garza Jr., and Reno Scum inserting themselves in the Impact World Tag Team Championship picture and winning them the following week, establishing themselves as heels in the process. On the March 30 episode of Impact Wrestling, Ortiz and Santana defeated Decay, Laredo Kid and Garza Jr. and Reno Scum to win the Impact World Tag Team Championship. On the April 23 episode of Impact Wrestling, Ortiz and Santana defeated Veterans of War (Mayweather and Wilcox) in a tournament finals to win the GFW Tag Team Championship. On November 5 at Bound for Glory, they lost to Ohio Versus Everything (OVE) as part of a double turn with Sami Callihan interfering on OVE's behalf, Jake Crist performing a low blow on Ortiz, and OVE attacking them after the match, thus turning LAX into face in the process.

On the May 24, 2018 episode of Impact King became the newest member of LAX. After the group leader Konnan was attacked, and Homicide and Diamante went missing in action, King assumed leadership of the faction and guided Ortiz and Santana back to being tag team champions. In June, Konnan and Diamante returned, both showing suspicion about King's involvement with the group. On the July 5, 2018 episode of Impact, Konnan confronted King who admitted that it was he who had "taken out a hit" against Konnan to take over the faction. King then attempted to get Ortiz and Santana to recognize him as the new head of the group but they rejected this and stood beside the original leader, Konnan. Then, former LAX members Hernandez and Homicide returned, entering the ring and attacking Konnan's trio. At Bound for Glory on October 14, Hernandez and Homicide lost to Ortiz and Santana in a Concrete Jungle Death match.

On January 12, 2019, The Lucha Bros (Pentagón Jr. and Rey Fénix) defeated LAX during the TV Tapings in Mexico to win the Impact World Tag Team Championships. Ortiz and Santana would reclaim them at the Rebellion pay per view on April 28. They held the titles until July, when they lost them to The North (Ethan Page and Josh Alexander).

On July 8, it was revealed that Santana and Ortiz would soon be leaving Impact and had interest from WWE and All Elite Wrestling. During August 9 tapings Ortiz and Santana were given a "send off" by the Impact locker room. Santana confirmed the following day that he and Ortiz were in fact done appearing on Impact Wrestling.

=== All Elite Wrestling (2019–present) ===
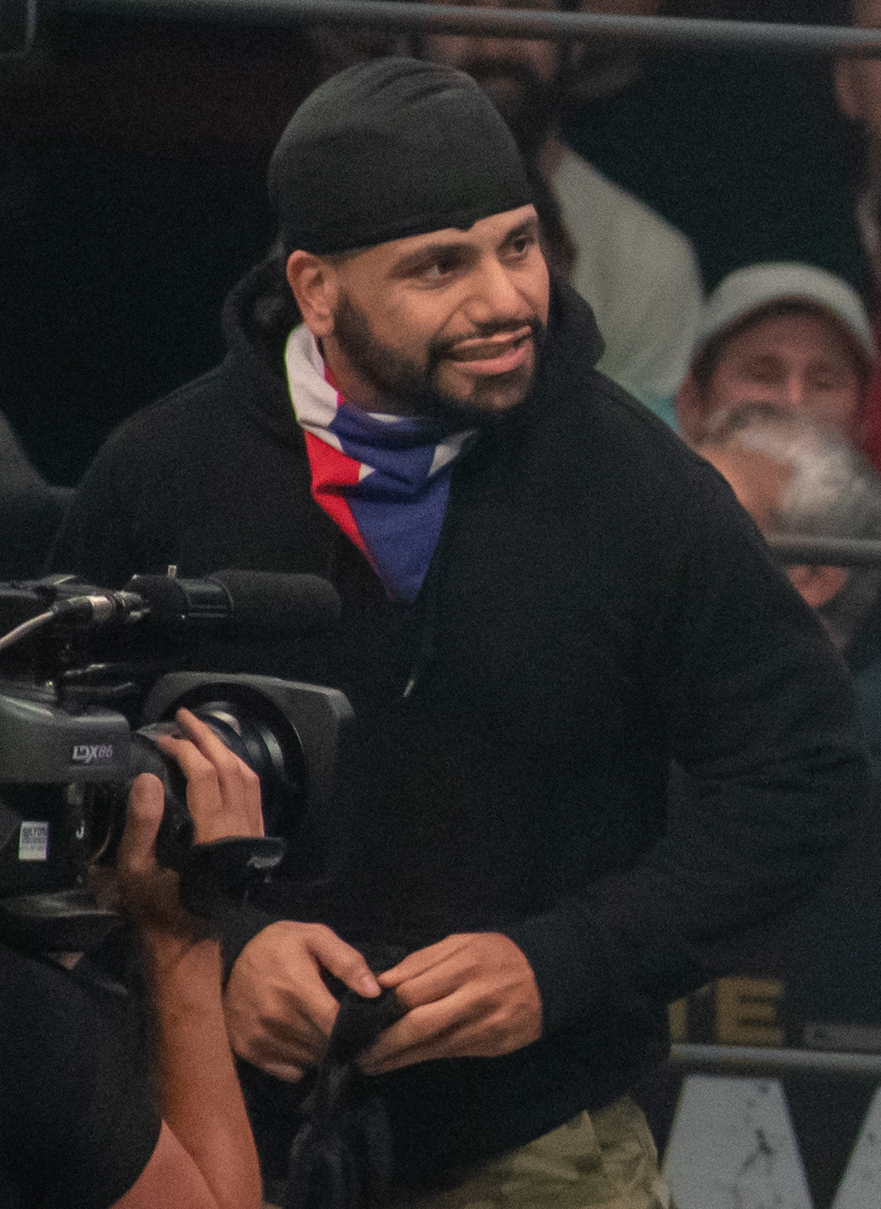
Ortiz in October 2019 as a member of The Inner Circle

On August 31, 2019, at All Out, Ortiz and Santana debuted as heels for All Elite Wrestling (AEW), attacking both Lucha Brothers (Pentagón Jr. and Fénix) and The Young Bucks (Matt Jackson and Nick Jackson) after their tag team ladder match. On October 2, the inaugural episode of Dynamite, they teamed with Chris Jericho in the main event and defeated The Elite (Kenny Omega and The Young Bucks). Led by Jericho, they subsequently formed a new faction along with Sammy Guevara and Jake Hager called The Inner Circle. On November 9 Full Gear, Ortiz and Santana were defeated by the Young Bucks. In 2020, the Inner Circle began a feud with The Elite. At Double or Nothing on May 23, The Inner Circle were defeated by The Elite and Matt Hardy in a Stadium Stampede match.

In March 2021, the Inner Circle began feuding with The Pinnacle, thus turning Santana and Ortiz faces in the process. On the Blood and Guts episode of Dynamite on May 5, The Inner Circle lost to The Pinnacle in the inaugural Blood and Guts match. However, in the main event of Double or Nothing on May 30, The Inner Circle defeated The Pinnacle in a Stadium Stampede match.

On the February 9, 2022 episode of AEW Dynamite, the Inner Circle had a team meeting that ended with Sammy Guevara throwing his vest and walking out. It was later announced that Jericho and Hager would face Santana and Ortiz in a tag team match the following week, with it being billed as the Inner Circle Implodes match. On the March 9, 2022 episode of Dynamite, the Inner Circle was disbanded after Jericho and Hager attacked Santana and Ortiz and formed an alliance with 2point0 and Daniel Garcia. On the June 15, 2022 special episode of Dynamite Road Rager, Ortiz would have his head shaved after losing a hair vs. hair match to Jericho. On the June 29, 2022 at Blood And Guts, they competed in the main event, defeating the Jericho Appreciation Society. During the match, Santana suffered a knee injury and would be out of action, leaving Ortiz as a singles wrestler.

The team reunited in 2023 and competed alongside the Blackpool Combat Club losing to Eddie Kingston, Penta El Zero M and Best Friends' Trent Beretta, Chuck Taylor and Orange Cassidy in a Stadium Stampede match at All In at Wembley Stadium on August 27. After the event, the team disbanded which led to a match on AEW Rampage on October 27, where Santana defeated Ortiz. On the January 20, 2024 episode of AEW Collision, Ortiz and Eddie Kingston lost to Bryan Danielson and Claudio Castagnoli during the match Ortiz ended up suffering a torn pectoral muscle which put him out of action.

In October 2025, Ortiz revealed that he began working backstage in AEW as a coach. On December 10, 2025, Ortiz wrestled his first AEW match in almost two years, where he was defeated by Hook in a dark match before Dynamite: Winter is Coming. Ortiz returned to AEW television at Worlds End Zero Hour on December 27, coming to the aid of Eddie Kingston from the Grizzled Young Veterans (James Drake and Zack Gibson).

=== Lucha Libre AAA Worldwide (2019) ===
On September 8, 2019, Ortiz and Santana debuted with the Mexican promotion Lucha Libre AAA Worldwide (AAA), earning their first victory after defeating the team of Arez and Daga and Laredo Kid and Myzteziz Jr.

== Personal life ==
He was close friends with his former tag team partner Miguel Sanchez, better known as Santana, before the two had a falling out in 2022. Sanchez later stated that there were no hard feelings on his part and wished Molina well.

== Championships and accomplishments ==
- AAW: Professional Wrestling Redefined
  - AAW Tag Team Championship (1 time) – with Santana
- All Elite Wrestling
  - Dynamite Award (3 times)
    - "Bleacher Report PPV Moment of the Year" (2021) – Stadium Stampede match (The Elite vs. The Inner Circle) – Double or Nothing (May 23)
    - "Biggest Beatdown" (2021) – The Inner Circle jumping Orange Cassidy – Dynamite (June 10)
    - Hardest Moment to Clean Up After (2021) – (Best Friends vs. Santana and Ortiz) – Dynamite (September 16)
- Combat Zone Wrestling
  - CZW World Tag Team Championship (1 time) – with Santana
- Global Force Wrestling
  - GFW Tag Team Championship (1 time, final) – with Santana
- House of Glory
  - HOG Tag Team Championship (3 times) – with Santana
- Impact Wrestling
  - Impact World Tag Team Championship (4 times) – with Santana
  - Impact Year End Award (1 time)
    - Tag Team of the Year (2018) – with Santana
- Jersey Championship Wrestling
  - JCW Tag Team Championships (1 time) – with Santana
- Outlaw Wrestling
  - Outlaw Wrestling Tag Team Championship (1 time) – with Eddie Kingston
- Pro Wrestling Illustrated
  - Faction of the Year (2021) – with The Inner Circle
  - Ranked Ortiz No. 115 of the top 500 singles wrestlers in the PWI 500 in 2019
- The Wrestling Revolver
  - Revolver Tag Team Championship (1 time) – with Mike Santana
- WrestlePro
  - WrestlePro Tag Team Championship (1 time) – with Santana
- Warriors Of Wrestling
  - WOW Tag Team Championship (1 time) – with Santana
- World Wrestling League
  - WWL World Tag Team Championship (1 time) – with Santana
- Xtreme Wrestling Alliance
  - XWA Tag Team Championship (1 time) – with Santana

== Luchas de Apuestas record ==
| Winner (wager) | Loser (wager) | Location | Event | Date | Notes |
|---|---|---|---|---|---|
| Chris Jericho (hair) | Ortiz (hair) | St. Louis, Missouri | Road Rager | June 15, 2022 | |
