= AEW Double or Nothing =

All Elite Wrestling pay-per-view event series

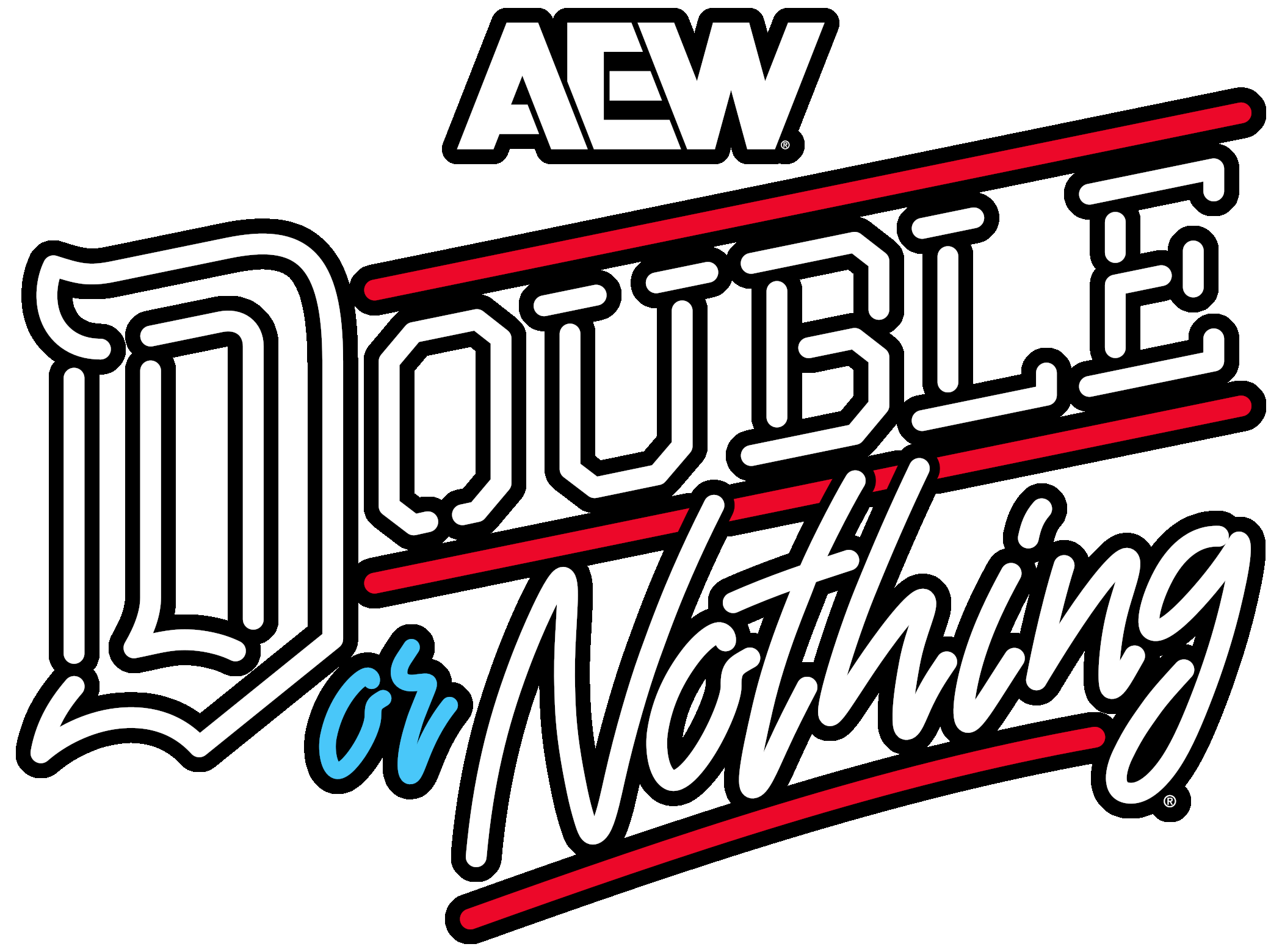
- AEW Double or Nothing logo
- Promotions: All Elite Wrestling
- First event: 2019
- Signature match: Stadium Stampede/Anarchy in the Arena

AEW Double or Nothing is a professional wrestling pay-per-view (PPV) event produced by All Elite Wrestling (AEW). Established in 2019, it is held annually in May during Memorial Day weekend. The inaugural Double or Nothing was also the first PPV as well as the first event produced by AEW. It is also considered one of the "Big Five" PPVs for AEW, along with All In, All Out, Full Gear, and Revolution, the company's five biggest shows produced annually; until 2023, it was considered AEW's marquee event before being supplanted by All In.

The name Double or Nothing was originally referenced in a promo that Cody Rhodes made immediately after the September 2018 All In event, which was an independently produced PPV that came as a result of a bet with wrestling journalist Dave Meltzer. Rhodes, a key figure behind the original All In who would become a co-founder and wrestler for AEW from 2019 to 2022, said "I know when you make a bet, sometimes you go double or nothing"—AEW was then founded in January 2019 with Double or Nothing as its first event that May. The name is also a reference to its gambling theme, as the event was traditionally held at arenas on the Las Vegas Strip in Paradise, Nevada until 2025. The exceptions to this during this time were the 2020 and 2021 events, which were originally scheduled for Vegas but had to be held at Daily's Place in Jacksonville, Florida due to the COVID-19 pandemic—after Florida loosened its COVID-19 protocols, the 2021 event was AEW's first PPV to have a full capacity crowd, as well as the final PPV held at Daily's Place before AEW resumed live touring in July that year. The 2025 event was the first non-pandemic era Double or Nothing to be held outside of Vegas, as it was held at the Desert Diamond Arena in Glendale, Arizona, but still maintained a gambling theme due to the venue's connection to Desert Diamond Casinos. The 2026 event was the first to not be held in a town or venue associated with casinos as it was held at the Louis Armstrong Stadium in Queens, New York, which was AEW's first PPV in New York.

Since the 2020 event, Double or Nothing has featured a specialized tornado tag team match between two multi-man teams as one of its marquee matches, oftentimes the main event. For 2020 and 2021, this was the Stadium Stampede match. To capitalize on the rise of cinematic matches during the pandemic, both year's events were headlined by Stadium Stampede, which was contested in both Daily's Place and the adjacent TIAA Bank Field. With the return to touring as well as events being held in arenas instead of stadiums, Stadium Stampede was replaced by Anarchy in the Arena in 2022, with the wrestlers fighting all throughout the host arenas. Stadium Stampede returned in 2026, as the event took place in a tennis stadium.

== History ==
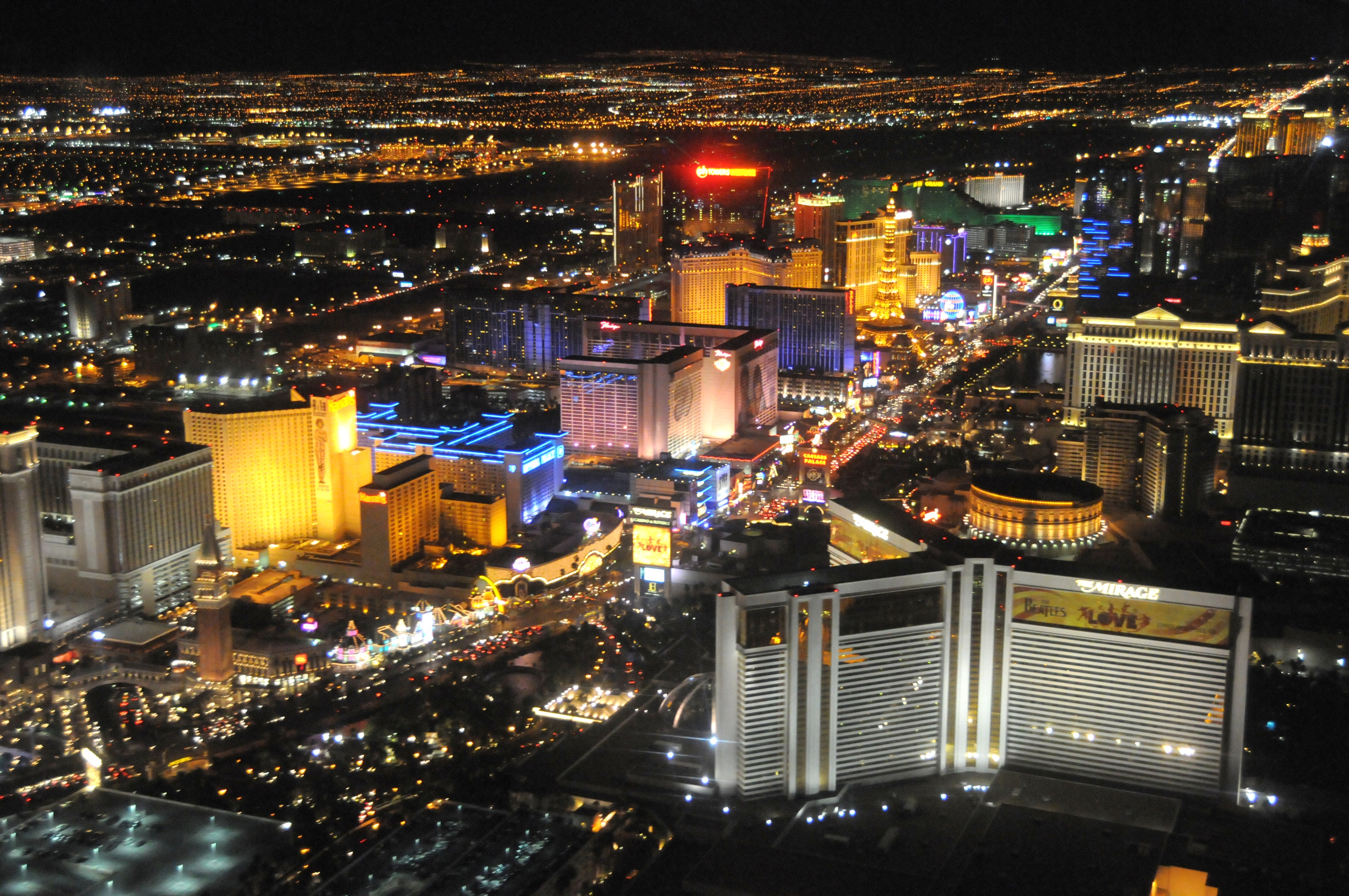
With the exception of the 2020 and 2021 events during the COVID-19 pandemic, the Double or Nothing events from 2019 through 2024 took on a gambling theme and were held at venues on the Las Vegas Strip in Paradise, Nevada.

After the success of the September 2018 All In event, an independent professional wrestling pay-per-view (PPV) event that came as a result of a bet with wrestling journalist Dave Meltzer, a group known as The Elite (Cody, The Young Bucks, and Kenny Omega), the driving forces behind the event, used the positive response from All In to pursue further events with backing of businessmen Shahid Khan and Tony Khan. In a promo after All In, Cody said "I know when you make a bet, sometimes you go double or nothing". On November 5, 2018, several trademarks were filed in Jacksonville, Florida, among them were "All Elite Wrestling" and "Double or Nothing", leading to speculation of the formation of a professional wrestling promotion and the name of its first event.

On January 1, 2019, All Elite Wrestling (AEW) was officially founded. Along with the announcement, the promotion's inaugural event, Double or Nothing, was scheduled to air on PPV during Memorial Day weekend on May 25, 2019, at the MGM Grand Garden Arena on the Las Vegas Strip in Paradise, Nevada, with the event taking on a Las Vegas theme. Double or Nothing would become considered AEW's marquee event, with AEW president Tony Khan later referring to the event as being one of the promotion's "big four" PPVs, their four biggest shows of the year produced quarterly, along with All Out, Full Gear, and Revolution. With All In becoming one of AEW's annual events in 2023, it supplanted Double or Nothing as AEW's marquee event, and overall biggest event of the year, with the previous "big four" plus All In becoming the "big five".

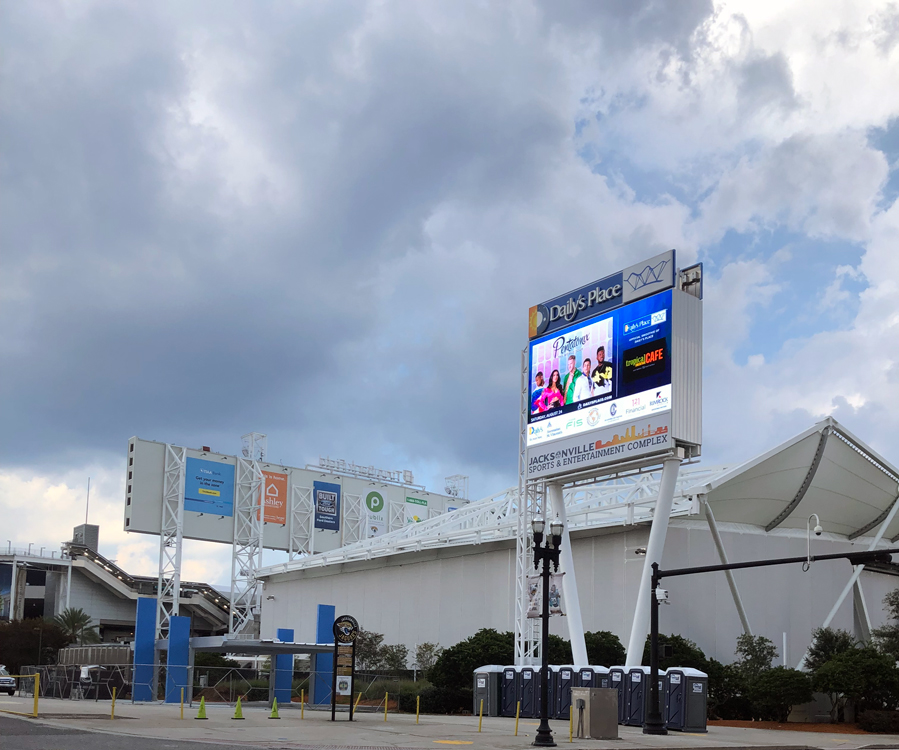
Due to the COVID-19 pandemic, the 2020 and 2021 events were held at AEW's home venue of Daily's Place in Jacksonville, Florida; the 2021 event was subsequently AEW's final pay-per-view event held at Daily's Place as the company resumed live touring that July.

While AEW had planned to again host the 2020 event at the same location on May 23 that year, the venue canceled all events up through May 31 due to the COVID-19 pandemic. In response, the promotion announced that the 2020 event would still proceed as planned (which occurred at Daily's Place and the TIAA Bank Field stadium in Jacksonville, Florida), while also confirming that a third Double or Nothing would emanate from the MGM Grand Garden Arena on May 29, 2021. However, due to the ongoing pandemic, the 2021 event was again held at Daily's Place and was moved back a day to May 30. AEW resumed live touring in July, thus the 2021 Double or Nothing was the promotion's final PPV held at Daily's Place during the pandemic. It was also the company's first show to run at full venue capacity during the pandemic after Florida loosened its COVID-19 protocols.

In December 2021, it was confirmed that the 2022 Double or Nothing would return the event to Las Vegas, and it would be held at the T-Mobile Arena. It was also announced that the event would host the finals of the inaugural Owen Hart Cup. The 2023 event was also held at the same arena on May 28 that year. On March 27, 2024, it was announced that after five years, the 2024 event would return Double or Nothing to the MGM Grand Garden Arena on May 26 that year.

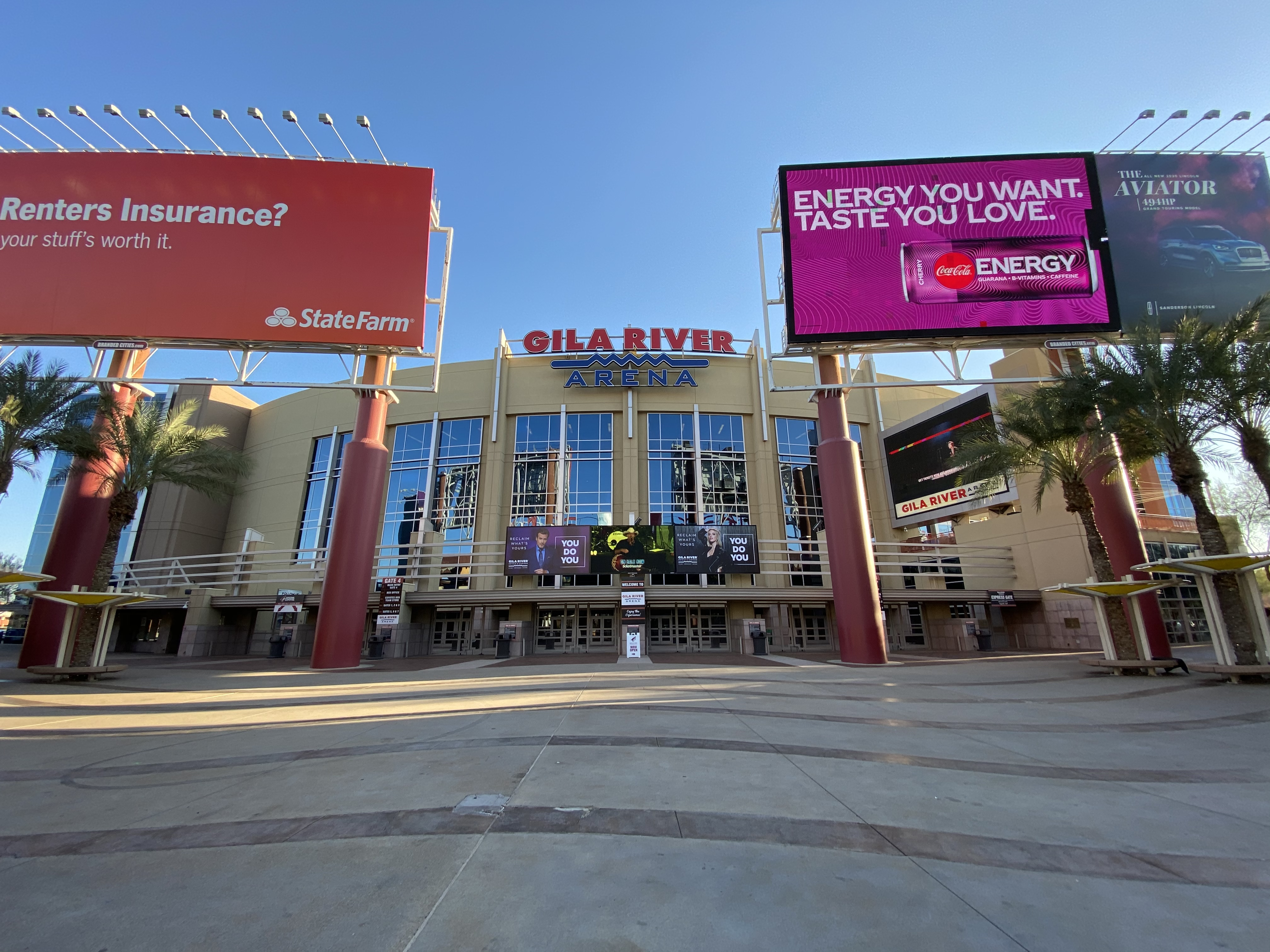
The 2025 Double or Nothing was held at the Desert Diamond Arena in Glendale, Arizona, marking the first non-pandemic Double or Nothing event to take place outside of Las Vegas, but still maintaining a gambling theme due to the venue's connection to Desert Diamond Casinos.

On February 19, 2025, it was announced that the 2025 Double or Nothing was scheduled for May 25, 2025, at the Desert Diamond Arena in Glendale, Arizona, ending the promotion's tradition of holding the event in the Las Vegas area. The venue shares its namesake with Desert Diamond Casinos, thus continuing Double or Nothing's gambling theme. The 2026 event was then the first Double or Nothing to not be held in a town or venue associated with casinos, as it was held at the Louis Armstrong Stadium in Queens, New York, which was AEW's first PPV held in New York.

== Events ==
No.	Event	Date	City	Venue	Main event	Ref.
1	Double or Nothing (2019)	May 25, 2019	Paradise, Nevada	MGM Grand Garden Arena	Chris Jericho vs. Kenny Omega to determine a contender for the inaugural AEW World Championship at All Out	
2	Double or Nothing (2020)	May 23, 2020	Jacksonville, Florida	Daily's Place; TIAA Bank Field	Matt Hardy and The Elite (Adam Page, Kenny Omega, Matt Jackson, and Nick Jackson) vs. The Inner Circle (Chris Jericho, Jake Hager, Sammy Guevara, Santana, and Ortiz) in a Stadium Stampede match	
3	Double or Nothing (2021)	May 30, 2021	Jacksonville, Florida	Daily's Place; TIAA Bank Field	The Inner Circle (Chris Jericho, Jake Hager, Sammy Guevara, Santana, and Ortiz) vs. The Pinnacle (MJF, Shawn Spears, Wardlow, Cash Wheeler, and Dax Harwood) in a Stadium Stampede match	
4	Double or Nothing (2022)	May 29, 2022	Paradise, Nevada	T-Mobile Arena	"Hangman" Adam Page (c) vs. CM Punk for the AEW World Championship	
5	Double or Nothing (2023)	May 28, 2023	Paradise, Nevada	T-Mobile Arena	Blackpool Combat Club (Bryan Danielson, Jon Moxley, Claudio Castagnoli, and Wheeler Yuta) vs. The Elite (Kenny Omega, Matt Jackson, Nick Jackson, and "Hangman" Adam Page) in an Anarchy in the Arena match	
6	Double or Nothing (2024)	May 26, 2024	Paradise, Nevada	MGM Grand Garden Arena	The Elite (Matthew Jackson, Nicholas Jackson, Kazuchika Okada, and Jack Perry) vs. Team AEW (Darby Allin, Bryan Danielson, Dax Harwood, and Cash Wheeler) in an Anarchy in the Arena match	
7	Double or Nothing (2025)	May 25, 2025	Glendale, Arizona	Desert Diamond Arena	"Hangman" Adam Page vs. Will Ospreay in the men's 2025 Owen Hart Foundation Cup Final for an AEW World Championship match at All In	
8	Double or Nothing (2026)	May 24, 2026	Queens, New York	Louis Armstrong Stadium	Darby Allin (c) vs. MJF in a Title vs. Hair match for the AEW World Championship	
(c) – refers to the champion(s) heading into the match

== See also ==
- List of All Elite Wrestling pay-per-view events
