= AEW Awards =

Annual professional wrestling awards

- Country: United States
- Presented by: All Elite Wrestling
- First award: January 27, 2021; 5 years ago
- Website: aewawards.com

The AEW Awards, also known as the AEW Dynamite Awards, are annual awards presented by All Elite Wrestling (AEW) to its professional wrestlers recognizing their accomplishments, along with the best and most viral moments from the preceding year. The inaugural edition took place on January 27, 2021. Fans cast votes online to decide the winners.

== Awards ==
=== 2021 ===
The 2021 award show, held on January 27, 2021, recognized the moments and accomplishments from October 2019—when AEW Dynamite first premiered—through the entire calendar year of 2020. The show was hosted by Tony Schiavone and special correspondent Dr. Britt Baker, D.M.D. The award winners were announced on the Bleacher Report app. Votes were cast through TNT's website. Shaquille O'Neal, Bert Kreischer, Chael Sonnen, Curtis Granderson, Camille Kostek, Kevin Heffernan, Steve Lemme, Ron Funches, Danielle Fishel, and Jensen Karp presented the awards virtually.

Winners are listed first, highlighted in boldface. Dates listed are for 2020 unless otherwise noted.

**Best Moment on the Mic**: **Cody Rhodes accepts Dog Collar match – Dynamite (September 30)**; MJF "We Deserve Better" speech – Dynamite (July 29); Jon Moxley accepts The Inner Circle invitation – Dynamite (January 8); Brandi Rhodes confronts Jade Cargill – Dynamite (November 11); Orange Cassidy debates Chris Jericho – Dynamite (August 5)	**Biggest Surprise**: **Sting's AEW debut – Winter Is Coming (December 2)**; Matt Hardy's debut – Dynamite (March 18); Jake Roberts confronts Cody Rhodes – Dynamite (March 4); Brodie Lee arrives as The Exalted One – Dynamite (March 18); Miro revealed as Best Man – Dynamite (September 9)
**Breakout Star – Male**: **Darby Allin**; Orange Cassidy; Eddie Kingston; John Silver	**Breakout Star – Female**: **Hikaru Shida**; Anna Jay; Tay Conti; Big Swole; Penelope Ford
**Biggest Beatdown**: **The Inner Circle jumps Orange Cassidy – Dynamite (June 10)**; The Dark Order attacks Nightmare Family – Dynamite (August 22); Nyla Rose puts Riho and Hikaru Shida through tables – Dynamite (January 1); Brian Cage sneak attacks Jon Moxley – Dynamite (June 10); Nightmare Family and The Inner Circle brawl – Dynamite (October 23, 2019)	**High Flyer Award**: **Rey Fenix**; Marq Quen; Nick Jackson; Pac
**Hardest Moment to Clean Up After**: **The Parking Lot Brawl (Best Friends vs. Santana and Ortiz) – Dynamite (September 16)**; Orange Cassidy drops orange juice on The Inner Circle – Fight for the Fallen (July 15); The Bunkhouse Match (Dustin Rhodes and Q. T. Marshall vs. The Butcher and The Blade) – Dynamite (November 11); Big Swole dumps garbage on Britt Baker – Dynamite (June 17)	**Biggest WTF Moment**: **Kenny Omega wins AEW World Championship and walks out of AEW – Winter Is Coming (December 2)**; Cody Rhodes steel cage moonsault – Dynamite (February 19); Sammy Guevara hit by golf cart – Dynamite (May 6); Bloody Britt Baker vs. Hikaru Shida – Dynamite (April 8); MJF lashes Cody Rhodes – Dynamite (February 5); The Young Bucks frog splash off the stadium railing – Double or Nothing (May 23)
**LOL Award**: **The Young Bucks kick MJF into a pool – Chris Jericho's Rock 'N' Wrestling Rager at Sea (January 22)**; Chris Jericho and MJF: Le Dinner Debonair – Dynamite (October 21); Britt Baker waxes Tony Schiavone – Dynamite (October 14); The Inner Circle Vegas trip – Dynamite (November 18)	**Best Twitter Follow**: **Nyla Rose**; MJF; Orange Cassidy; Britt Baker
**Bleacher Report PPV Moment of the Year**: **Stadium Stampede match (The Elite vs. The Inner Circle) – Double or Nothing (May 23)**; Jon Moxley wins AEW World Championship – Revolution (February 29); Hikaru Shida wins AEW Women's World Championship – Double or Nothing (May 23); Kenny Omega and Adam Page defeat The Young Bucks – Revolution (February 29); Darby Allin wins AEW TNT Championship – Full Gear (November 7); The Young Bucks win AEW World Tag Team Championship – Full Gear (November 7)

=== 2022 ===
The 2022 award show, which aired on AEW's YouTube channel on March 23, 2022, recognized the moments and accomplishments for the entire calendar year of 2021. The show was hosted by Tony Schiavone, with co-hosts Dr. Britt Baker, D.M.D., Scorpio Sky, and Ethan Page.

Winners are listed first, highlighted in boldface.

**Wrestler of the Year**: **Kenny Omega**; Bryan Danielson; Dr. Britt Baker, D.M.D.; Adam Page; Darby Allin; Hikaru Shida; Miro	**Biggest Surprise**: **Adam Cole and Bryan Danielson debut at All Out**; Darby Allin returns as The Invisible Man on Dynamite (October 27); The formation of The Pinnacle on Dynamite (March 10); The Young Bucks turn on Jon Moxley on Dynamite (April 7); Mercedes Martinez returns at New's Year Smash (December 29)
**Breakout Star – Male**: **Sammy Guevara**; Dante Martin; Jungle Boy; Ricky Starks; Hook	**Breakout Star – Female**: **Jade Cargill**; Jamie Hayter; Tay Conti; Kris Statlander; Red Velvet
**Biggest Beatdown**: **Adam Page goes 60 minutes with Bryan Danielson at Winter Is Coming**; Men of the Year (Ethan Page and Scorpio Sky) send Darby Allin on a trip at Blood and Guts; Bryan Danielson kicks Colt Cabana's tooth out on Dynamite (November 24); The Pinnacle takes down The Inner Circle at Blood and Guts; Thunder Rosa takes down Dr. Britt Baker, D.M.D. at St. Patrick's Day Slam	**High Flyer Award**: **Dante Martin**; Penta El Zero Miedo; Rey Fenix; Pac; Riho
**Best Moment on the Mic**: **CM Punk returns at The First Dance (August 20)**; Bryan Danielson calls out Kenny Omega on Dynamite (September 15); Dr. Britt Baker, D.M.D. welcomes fans to Brittsburgh on Dynamite (August 11); MJF thinks the Midwest is mid on Dynamite (September 8); Eddie Kingston is sent to punish Miro on Rampage (September 3)	**Biggest WTF Moment**: **TayJay (Anna Jay and Tay Conti) vs. The Bunny and Penelope Ford in a Street Fight on New's Year Smash (December 31)**; Matt Jackson tacked Travis Scott shoe at All Out; MJF's Long Island homecoming on Dynamite (December 8); Jon Moxley and Eddie Kingston take a drive on Dynamite (April 21); Adam Page turns down The Dark Order on Dynamite (January 20)
**Best Twitter Follow**: **Nyla Rose**; The Young Bucks; MJF; Dr. Britt Baker, D.M.D.; Orange Cassidy	**Best Fashion Moment**: **Dr. Britt Baker, D.M.D. Brittsburgh on Dynamite (August 11)**; Tay Conti at Full Gear; Hikaru Shida's anniversary dress on Dynamite (May 29); Chris Jericho as Painmaker at Fight for the Fallen; The Super Elite (Kenny Omega, Matt Jackson, and Nick Jackson) as the Toon Squad at Fight for the Fallen
**Best Mic Duel**: **CM Punk and MJF on Thanksgiving Eve on Dynamite (November 24)**; Dr. Britt Baker D.M.D. and Ruby Soho on Rampage (September 17); The Inner Circle and The Pinnacle have a parley on Dynamite (April 28); Adam Page meets Bryan Danielson on Dynamite (November 17); The Inner Circle (Chris Jericho and Jake Hager) call out Dan Lambert on Dynamite (September 15)	**Best Tag Team Brawl**: **The Young Bucks (Matt Jackson and Nick Jackson) vs Lucha Brothers (Penta El Zero Miedo and Rey Fenix) in a Steel Cage match at All Out**; Suzuki-gun (Lance Archer and Minoru Suzuki) vs. Jon Moxley and Eddie Kingston at Grand Slam Part 2 (September 24); Sting and Darby Allin vs. 2.0 (Jeff Parker and Matt Lee) on Dynamite (August 18); Lucha Brothers (Penta El Zero Miedo and Rey Fenix vs. Jurassic Express (Jungle Boy and Luchasaurus) in Tag Team Eliminator Final on Rampage (August 25); TayJay (Anna Jay and Tay Conti) vs. The Bunny and Penelope Ford in a Street Fight on New's Year Smash (December 31)

== See also ==
- List of professional wrestling awards
