= Inner Circle (professional wrestling) =

American professional wrestling stable

- The logo of the Inner Circle

Stable
- Leader: Chris Jericho
- Members: Jake Hager; Santana; Ortiz; Sammy Guevara; MJF; Wardlow
- Name: Inner Circle
- Debut: October 9, 2019
- Disbanded: March 9, 2022
- Years active: 2019–2022

The Inner Circle was an American professional wrestling stable formed in American professional wrestling promotion All Elite Wrestling (AEW), created and led by Chris Jericho. It also consisted of original members Sammy Guevara, Jake Hager, Santana and Ortiz.

The stable was formed during the first episode of AEW Dynamite and became one of the central acts of the promotion during the first years, since Jericho became the AEW World Champion. The stable first notable feud was against The Elite, being defeated in a Stadium Stampede. The stable also included MJF and Wardlow for a few months before MJF turned on them and created his own stable, The Pinnacle, facing both stables in a Blood and Guts match and a Stadium Stampede. During the final months of the stable, they feuded with American Top Team and Sammy Guevara won the AEW TNT Championship twice. The stable disbanded after Jericho and Hager turned on Santana and Ortiz, with several members joining the Jericho Appreciation Society, also led by Jericho.

== History ==
=== Origins ===
At All Out on August 31, Chris Jericho became the inaugural AEW World Champion after defeating Adam Page. At the same event, Santana and Ortiz made their AEW debut by attacking Nick Jackson and Lucha Brothers.

On the premiere episode of AEW Dynamite on October 2, at the main event of the night, Kenny Omega and The Young Bucks were defeated by Jericho and Santana and Ortiz. After the match, Jake Hager made his AEW debut by helping Jericho, Sammy Guevara, Santana and Ortiz by attacking The Young Bucks, Dustin Rhodes and Cody. October 9, On the following episode of Dynamite, Jericho officially unveiled the new stable as "The Inner Circle".

=== Prominence ===
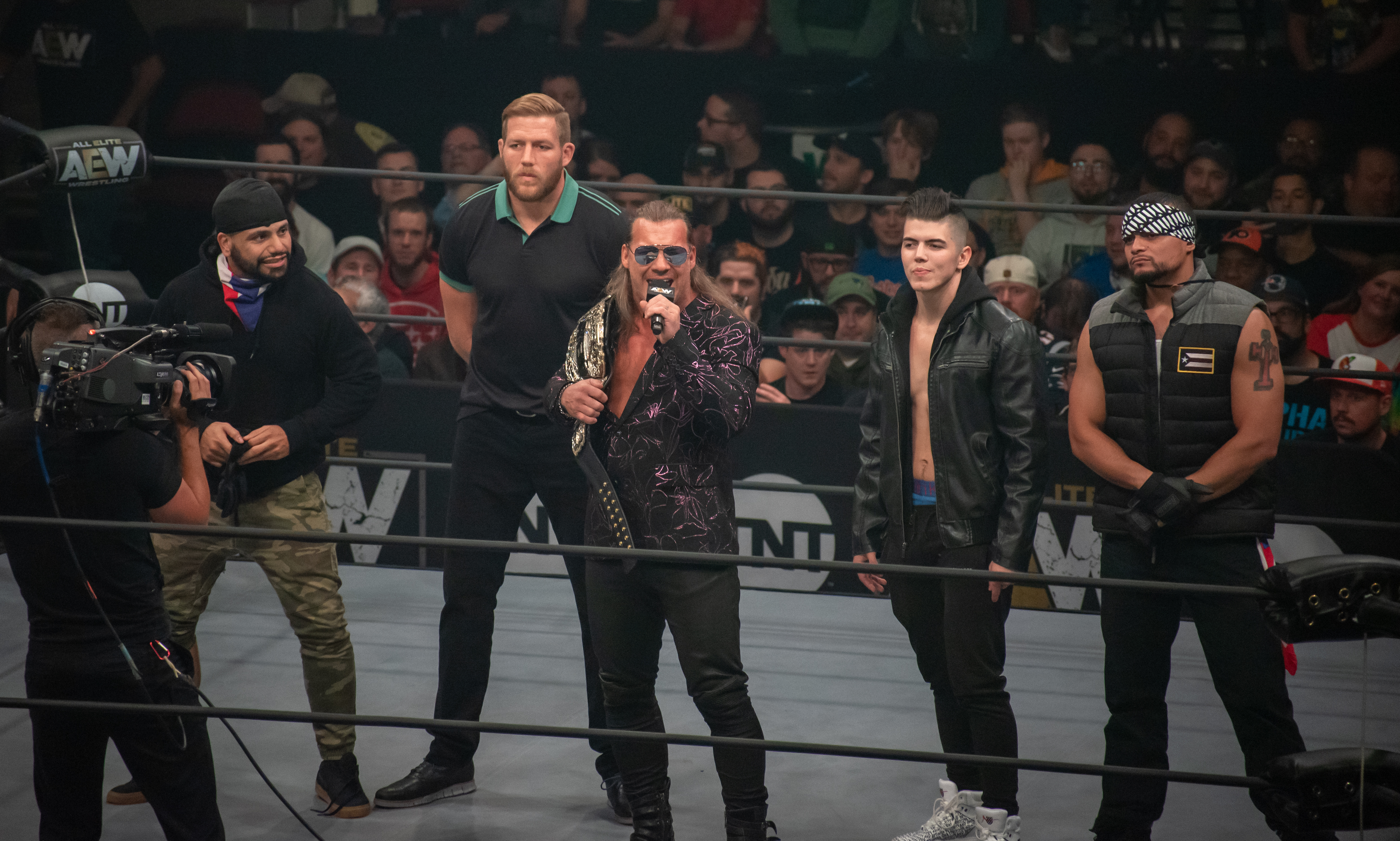
Members of the Inner Circle in October 2019 during a segment on AEW Dynamite

The Inner Circle's success continued at the Full Gear pay-per-view on November 9, as Santana and Ortiz defeated the Young Bucks while Jericho successfully retained the AEW World Championship over Cody. On the episode of Dynamite after Full Gear, Jericho and Guevara challenged SoCal Uncensored (Frankie Kazarian and Scorpio Sky) for the AEW World Tag Team Championship, but they failed to win when Sky pinned Jericho with a small package, giving Jericho his first loss in AEW. On the November 27 episode of Dynamite, Jericho successfully defended his world championship against Sky. In December, Jericho feuded with Jon Moxley, offering him a spot in the group and also bringing in Jeff Cobb as a "hired gun" to attack Moxley. Despite all this, Moxley defeated Jericho to win the AEW World Championship at Revolution on February 29, 2020, ending Jericho's inaugural AEW World Championship reign at 182 days.

During the following weeks, The Inner Circle feuded with The Elite and "Broken" Matt Hardy, culminating at Double or Nothing in the first-ever Stadium Stampede match in which Sammy Guevara was pinned by Kenny Omega.

=== MJF and The Pinnacle ===
On November 7 at Full Gear, MJF and Wardlow became the newest members of The Inner Circle after MJF defeated Jericho. On AEW's New Year's Smash, Wardlow defeated Jake Hager with mutual respect shown afterward. On the February 10, 2021, edition of AEW Dynamite, following weeks of growing tension between MJF & Guevara, Guevara attacked MJF following a backstage confrontation which gave MJF a kayfabe rib injury. Later on in the episode, Guevara announced his departure from The Inner Circle.

On the March 10, 2021, edition of Dynamite, a "War Council" was called by the Inner Circle after Chris Jericho and MJF failed to capture the AEW World Tag Team Championship over The Young Bucks at Revolution. During the segment, Guevara came out and revealed that MJF had been planning a coup of the Inner Circle against Jericho and thought he'd convinced Hager, Santana and Ortiz to join him, only to discover that Guevara had secretly taped it, and the three were faking it to expose MJF's duplicity, leading Jericho to fire MJF from the group. MJF then revealed that he had created his own stable (which would subsequently be named The Pinnacle) consisting of Wardlow, FTR, Shawn Spears, and Tully Blanchard who appeared and violently attacked The Inner Circle, ending with Wardlow powerbombing Jericho off the stage and through a table. This betrayal and attack resulted in the entirety of the Inner Circle turning face. The entire group returned on the March 31 episode of Dynamite after weeks of absence, hiding in their old dressing room which was previously taken over by the Pinnacle. They then proceeded to violently attack each member of the group, and reclaim their dressing room.

The Inner Circle and The Pinnacle fought at AEW Blood and Guts in the May 5 edition of AEW Dynamite. The match, stylized after the War Games match, saw the Pinnacle emerge victorious after Guevara surrendered on behalf of the group as MJF threatened to throw Jericho from the top of the cage. The Inner Circle returned a week after to interrupt a coronation ceremony hosted by the Pinnacle, where they hosed down the latter with champagne. This led to a Stadium Stampede match at Double or Nothing, where the participating wrestlers feuded with each other individually- Jericho with MJF, Hager with Wardlow, Guevara with Spears, and Santana and Ortiz with FTR. This match came with the added stipulation that if The Inner Circle lost, they would permanently disband. The Inner Circle won the match, with Guevara pinning Spears, in the main event of the show.

=== Independent endeavors ===
Jericho then began pursuing another match with MJF, who stated that he would first have to defeat a gauntlet of opponents selected by MJF, in a series dubbed the "Labors of Jericho". Jericho defeated each of MJF's handpicked opponents (Shawn Spears, Nick Gage, Juventud Guerrera and Wardlow) and faced MJF in the final labor on the August 18 episode of Dynamite, but he was defeated. Jericho demanded one more match, stipulating that if he lost, he would retire from in-ring competition, which MJF accepted. At All Out on September 5, Jericho defeated MJF to maintain his career and end their feud.

On the June 30th edition of AEW Dynamite, Sammy Guevara lost to MJF after Spears hit him with a chair to the head. On the August 18th episode of Dynamite, Guevara announced his engagement to his girlfriend. Later in the night, Guevara defeated Shawn Spears.

Guevara then began a feud with Miro, who'd attacked and embarrassed Fuego Del Sol. Guevara was subsequently granted a match for the TNT Championship on Dynamite, and on September 29, Guevara won the AEW TNT Championship at Dynamite by defeating Miro.

Proud and Powerful began a lengthy feud with FTR.

=== Feud with Men of the Year and American Top Team ===
Dan Lambert introduced the stable American Top Team. The team consists of UFC fighters Andrei Arlovski, Junior Dos Santos, Jorge Masvidal, and Paige Vanzant, with the stable also being allied with the Men of the Year, Ethan Page and Scorpio Sky. Lambert's consistent bashing of AEW and its roster instantly drew the ire of Jericho, who would challenge the Men of the Year to a tag match against himself and Hager on Rampage: Grand Slam, but due to the various interference by American Top Team, Men of the Year ultimately emerged as the victors. A rematch was set with a 6-man tag team match that consisted of the Men of the Year alongside Junior Dos Santos, who was making his pro wrestling debut, against the team of Jericho, Hager, and TNT Champion, Sammy Guevera. Due to interference from Lambert and Paige Vanzant, American Top Team was once again victorious. After a post-match beat down of Guevara, Jericho, and Hager, Santana and Ortiz ran off American Top Team.

=== Betrayal and Jericho Appreciation Society ===
On the March 9, 2022, episode of Dynamite after the fallout of Revolution, Jericho had attempted to shake Eddie Kingston's hand only for 2point0 to attack both men and the fellow Inner Circle members to save Jericho, leading to a heel turn for him and Jake Hager. After beating down Ortiz and Santana, Jericho created a new stable called the "Jericho Appreciation Society," which consisted of himself, Hager, 2point0, and Daniel Garcia, disbanding The Inner Circle name in the process. The JAS started a feud with Santana, Ortiz, Kingston and the Blackpool Combat Club, managed by William Regal and consisting of Moxley, Bryan Danielson, and Wheeler Yuta. After a match at Double or Nothing, with the Jericho Appreciation Society victorious, Jericho defeated Ortiz in a hair vs hair match on the June 15, 2022, episode of Dynamite with the help of Guevara.

== Members ==
*	Founding member
L	Leader

=== Former ===
Member		Joined	Left
Chris Jericho	*L	October 9, 2019	March 9, 2022
Jake Hager	*	October 9, 2019	March 9, 2022
Ortiz	*	October 9, 2019	March 9, 2022
Santana	*	October 9, 2019	March 9, 2022
Sammy Guevara	*	October 9, 2019 (Note: On February 10, 2021, Sammy Guevara quit the Inner Circle. He would return to the group a month later on March 10 when it was revealed that his departure was part of a plan to expose MJF's attempted coup.)	February 9, 2022
MJF		November 7, 2020	March 10, 2021
Wardlow		November 7, 2020	March 10, 2021

=== Honorary ===
Member	Joined
Mike Tyson	April 7, 2021

== Sub-groups ==
Affiliate	Members	Tenure	Type
Santana and Ortiz	Santana; Ortiz	2019–2022	Tag team

== Championships and accomplishments ==
- All Elite Wrestling
  - AEW World Championship (1 time) – Jericho
  - AEW TNT Championship (2 times) – Guevara
  - Interim AEW TNT Championship (1 time) – Guevara
  - Dynamite Diamond Ring (2020) – MJF
  - Dynamite Award (2 times)
    - "Bleacher Report PPV Moment of the Year" (2021) – Stadium Stampede match (The Elite vs. The Inner Circle) at Double or Nothing
    - "Biggest Beatdown" (2021) – The Inner Circle jumping Orange Cassidy on Dynamite (June 10)
- CBS Sports
  - Worst Moment of the Year (2020) – Guevara vs. Matt Hardy at All Out
- Pro Wrestling Illustrated
  - Faction of the Year (2021)
  - Feud of the Year (2021) vs. MJF – Jericho
  - Ranked Jericho No. 3. of the top 500 singles wrestlers in the PWI 500 in 2020
  - Ranked Guevara No. 61 of the top 500 singles wrestlers in the PWI 500 in 2020
  - Ranked Santana No. 126 of the top 500 singles wrestlers in the PWI 500 in 2020
  - Ranked Ortiz No. 128 of the top 500 singles wrestlers in the PWI 500 in 2020
  - Ranked Hager No. 176 of the top 500 singles wrestlers in the PWI 500 in 2020
- Wrestling Observer Newsletter
  - Wrestler of the Year (2019) – Jericho
  - Best on Interviews (2019) – Jericho
  - United States/Canada MVP (2019) – Jericho
  - Most Charismatic (2019) – Jericho
  - Best Box Office Draw (2019) – Jericho
  - Most Charismatic (2020) – MJF
