= Double or Nothing (2021) =

All Elite Wrestling pay-per-view event

- Promotional poster featuring various AEW wrestlers
- Promotion: All Elite Wrestling
- Date: May 30, 2021
- City: Jacksonville, Florida
- Venue: Daily's Place; TIAA Bank Field
- Attendance: 5,200
- Buy rate: 135,000–150,000

Pay-per-view chronology
← Previous; Revolution	Next → All Out

Double or Nothing chronology
← Previous; 2020	Next → 2022

The 2021 Double or Nothing was the third annual Double or Nothing professional wrestling pay-per-view (PPV) event produced by All Elite Wrestling (AEW). It took place during Memorial Day weekend on May 30, 2021. The event was primarily held at Daily's Place in Jacksonville, Florida; however, portions of the main event match were pre-taped at the nearby TIAA Bank Field. It was the first Double or Nothing event to be held on a Sunday. It was also AEW's last PPV to be held at Daily's Place during the COVID-19 pandemic. Double or Nothing was originally scheduled to be held at the MGM Grand Garden Arena in Paradise, Nevada on May 29, but was moved to Daily's Place and pushed back a day due to the pandemic. The event aired through traditional PPV providers, as well as on B/R Live in North America and FITE TV internationally.

Ten matches were contested at the event, including one on The Buy In pre-show. In the main event, The Inner Circle (Chris Jericho, Jake Hager, Sammy Guevara, Santana, and Ortiz) defeated The Pinnacle (MJF, Wardlow, Shawn Spears, Cash Wheeler, and Dax Harwood) in a Stadium Stampede match; had The Inner Circle lost, they would have been forced to disband. In other prominent matches, Kenny Omega defeated Orange Cassidy and Pac in a three-way match to retain the AEW World Championship, Dr. Britt Baker, D.M.D. defeated Hikaru Shida by submission to win the AEW Women's World Championship, Sting and Darby Allin defeated Scorpio Sky and Ethan Page, and The Young Bucks (Matt Jackson and Nick Jackson) defeated Jon Moxley and Eddie Kingston to retain the AEW World Tag Team Championship. The event was also notable for the surprise appearances of Lio Rush and Mark Henry, making their AEW debut, as well as a cameo appearance by Konnan during the Stadium Stampede match.

Double or Nothing drew 5,200 attendees, making it AEW's highest attended event since the start of the pandemic up to that point, and also making it the first AEW event to emanate with a full capacity crowd since the start of the pandemic. It also garnered an estimated 135,000 pay-per-view buys, and generated over $6 million in revenue, which in turn made it the third highest grossing non-WWE professional wrestling PPV event since 1999.

== Production ==
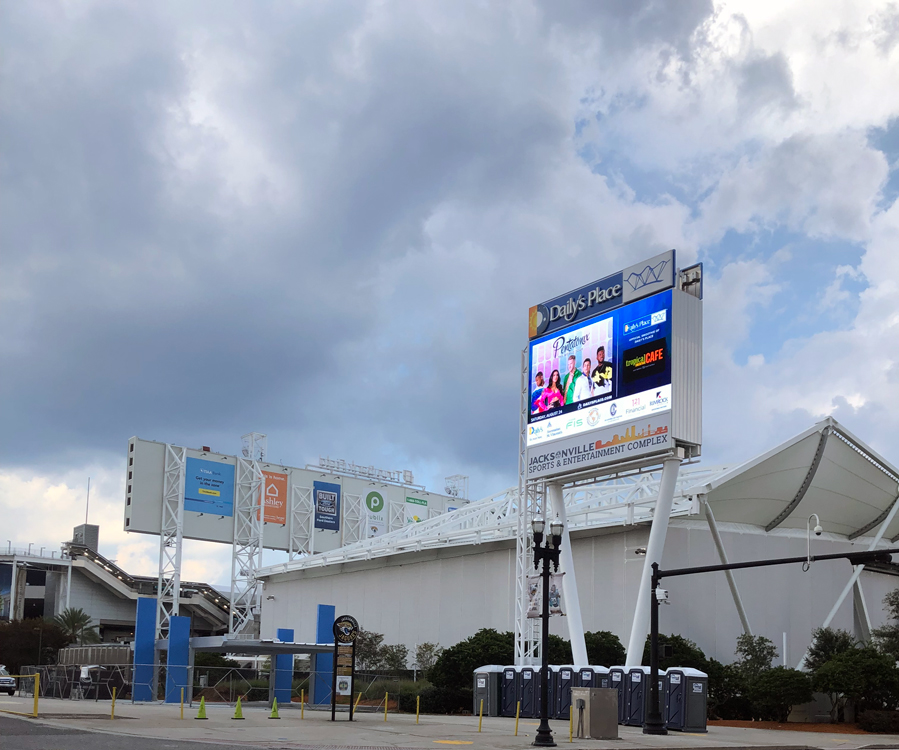
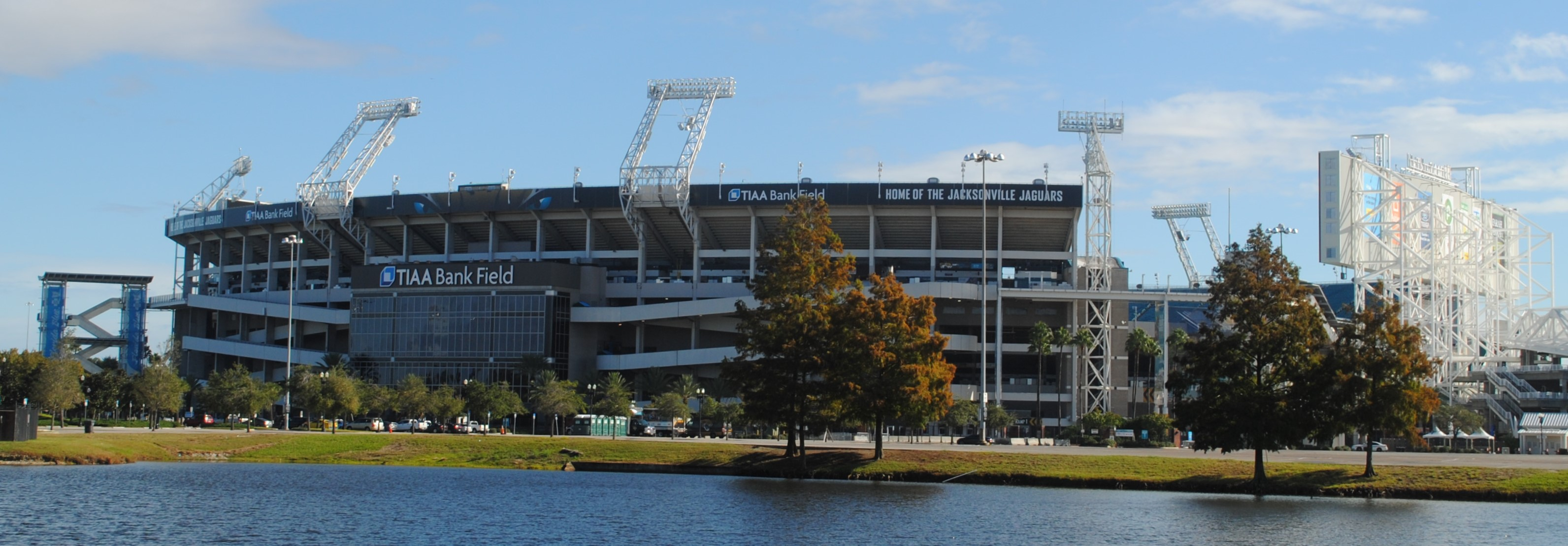
Due to the COVID-19 pandemic, the majority of the event was held at Daily's Place (top) with portions of the main event occurring within the adjacent TIAA Bank Field stadium (bottom) in Jacksonville, Florida. This would be All Elite Wrestling's final pay-per-view event held at either of these locations as the company resumed live touring in July.

=== Background ===
Double or Nothing is considered All Elite Wrestling's (AEW) marquee event, having first been held in 2019, which was the promotion's first professional wrestling event and first pay-per-view (PPV) produced. It is held annually in May during Memorial Day weekend and is one of AEW's "Big Four" PPVs, which includes All Out, Full Gear, and Revolution, their four biggest domestic shows produced quarterly. The event's name is a reference to its Las Vegas theme, which was where the inaugural event was held. Announced on March 7, 2021, the third Double or Nothing event was scheduled to be held on May 30 at AEW's home base of Daily's Place in Jacksonville, Florida, with portions of the main event taking place at the nearby TIAA Bank Field stadium. As part of the Double or Nothing weekend, Dynamite aired live on TNT on May 28 as a special Friday Night Dynamite (as it normally airs Wednesdays). Additionally, AEW held a Double or Nothing Fan Fest on May 29, featuring live stage shows, exhibition matches, meet and greets, and more.

AEW partnered with Cinemark Theatres, Harkins Theatres, and Marcus Theatres to host Double or Nothing in select movie theatres. On May 29, TNT aired a one-hour television special previewing the event called Countdown to Double or Nothing.

==== Impact of the COVID-19 pandemic ====
While AEW had plans to host the 2020 Double or Nothing at the MGM Grand Garden Arena on the Las Vegas Strip, which was where the original show emanated, the venue canceled the event due to the COVID-19 pandemic. In response, AEW announced that the 2020 event would still proceed as planned, which occurred at Daily's Place and the TIAA Bank Field stadium in Jacksonville, Florida. The announcement also confirmed that a third Double or Nothing event would occur at the MGM Grand Garden Arena on May 29, 2021; in addition to offering refunds, tickets purchased for 2020's show would be valid for 2021. However, at Revolution on March 7, 2021, AEW announced that the 2021 Double or Nothing would instead be held at Daily's Place in Jacksonville due to the ongoing pandemic, and was moved back a day to May 30; as a result, the MGM Grand Garden Arena issued refunds for all originally purchased tickets. On May 5, AEW President and Chief Executive Officer Tony Khan announced that Daily's Place would be operating at full capacity for Double or Nothing, making it AEW's first show since the start of the pandemic to go ahead with a full crowd.

=== Storylines ===
Double or Nothing featured professional wrestling matches that involved different wrestlers from pre-existing feuds and storylines. Storylines were produced on AEW's weekly television program, Dynamite, the supplementary online streaming shows, Dark and Elevation, and The Young Bucks' YouTube series Being The Elite.

At the Full Gear event on November 7, 2020, MJF defeated Chris Jericho for the right to join Jericho's faction, The Inner Circle (consisting of Jericho, Sammy Guevara, Jake Hager, Santana and Ortiz). However, on the March 10, 2021 episode of Dynamite, MJF betrayed The Inner Circle and revealed that he had been secretly building his own group, named The Pinnacle (consisting of Shawn Spears, Wardlow, FTR (Dax Harwood and Cash Wheeler), and manager Tully Blanchard). At the Blood and Guts event on May 5, The Pinnacle defeated The Inner Circle in a Blood and Guts match, and on the following episode of Dynamite, The Pinnacle challenged The Inner Circle to a Stadium Stampede match at Double or Nothing, with the stipulation that if The Inner Circle were to lose, they would be forced to disband. On the May 19 episode of Dynamite, The Inner Circle accepted the proposal.

At Blood and Guts, a match between Orange Cassidy (#1) and Pac (#2), the two top-ranked singles wrestlers in AEW, was announced for the following week's episode of Dynamite, with the winner receiving a match against Kenny Omega for the AEW World Championship at Double or Nothing. However, their match ended in a double knockout, thus it was decided that Omega would defend the championship against both Cassidy and Pac in a three-way match at Double or Nothing.

On the April 21 episode of Dynamite, Britt Baker, who was ranked #1 on the women's rankings, confronted Hikaru Shida after Shida retained the AEW Women's World Championship against Tay Conti. At Blood and Guts, a championship match between the two was arranged for Double or Nothing.

On the April 7 episode of Dynamite, AEW World Tag Team Champions The Young Bucks (Matt Jackson and Nick Jackson) attacked Jon Moxley and Eddie Kingston, and aligned themselves with their longtime friend Kenny Omega, as well as Omega's allies The Good Brothers (Doc Gallows and Karl Anderson) from Impact Wrestling. On the May 12 episode of Dynamite, The Young Bucks challenged Moxley and Kingston to a match at Double or Nothing with the AEW World Tag Team Championship on the line.

On the May 12 episode of Dynamite, Miro defeated Darby Allin to win the AEW TNT Championship, and was afterwards confronted by Lance Archer. On the following week's episode of Dynamite, a match between the two for the championship was scheduled for Double or Nothing.

On the March 31 episode of Dynamite, Cody Rhodes was attacked by his former friend Q. T. Marshall, who allied himself with Nick Comoroto, Aaron Solow, and the newly debuted Anthony Ogogo to form a new faction dubbed The Factory. At Blood and Guts on May 5, Rhodes defeated Marshall, but after the match was assaulted by Ogogo, who knocked Rhodes down before covering him with the flag of the United Kingdom. On the May 12 episode of Dynamite, Rhodes challenged Ogogo to a match at Double or Nothing.

On the April 28 episode of Dynamite, Ethan Page and Scorpio Sky attacked Darby Allin and Sting. On the May 19 episode of Dynamite, a match pitting Allin and Sting against Page and Sky was announced for Double or Nothing, making it Sting's first match to take place in front of a live audience since competing at WWE's Night of Champions in September 2015.

On the May 12 episode of Dynamite, Christian Cage and Matt Sydal declared themselves as entrants for the Casino Battle Royale. Seven more participants were revealed on the May 18 episode of Dark, and the remaining eleven competitors were unveiled on the following night's episode of Dynamite.

On the February 17 episode of Dynamite, Riho defeated Serena Deeb during the first round of the AEW Women's World Championship Eliminator Tournament. On May 26, a match between the two was set up for the Double or Nothing pre-show, with Deeb's NWA World Women's Championship on the line.

== Event ==
Other on-screen personnel
Role	Name
Commentators	Jim Ross (PPV)
Commentators	Excalibur (Pre-show and PPV)
Commentators	Tony Schiavone (Pre-show and PPV)
Commentators	Taz (Page vs. Cage)
Commentators	Paul Wight (Casino Battle Royale)
Commentators	Don Callis (World and Tag Title matches)
Spanish commentators	Alex Abrahantes
Spanish commentators	Dasha Gonzalez
Spanish commentators	Rey Fenix
French commentators	Alain Mistrangélo
French commentators	Norbert Feuillan
German commentators	Günter Zapf
German commentators	Mike Ritter
Ring announcer	Justin Roberts
Referees	Aubrey Edwards
Referees	Bryce Remsburg
Referees	Frank Gastineau
Referees	Mike Posey
Referees	Paul Turner
Referees	Rick Knox

=== The Buy-In ===
On The Buy-In pre-show, Serena Deeb defended the NWA World Women's Championship against Riho. Deeb forced Riho to submit to a "Serenity Lock" to retain the title.

=== Preliminary matches ===
The actual pay-per-view opened with "Hangman" Adam Page facing Brian Cage. After Cage was involved in a miscue with his allies Ricky Starks and Hook, Page performed the "Buckshot Lariat" on Cage to win the match.

Next, The Young Bucks (Matt Jackson and Nick Jackson) (accompanied by Brandon Cutler) defended the AEW World Tag Team Championship against Jon Moxley and Eddie Kingston. In the climax, The Young Bucks performed four consecutive "BTE Triggers" on Moxley to retain the title.

After that, the Casino Battle Royale, with the winner receiving a future AEW World Championship match, was contested. Former WWE wrestler and current New Japan Pro-Wrestling wrestler Lio Rush was a surprise entrant, drawing the joker card. Jungle Boy last eliminated Christian Cage to win the match.

In the next match, Cody Rhodes (accompanied by Arn Anderson) faced Anthony Ogogo (accompanied by Q. T. Marshall). Rhodes performed the "Vertebreaker" on Ogogo to win the match.

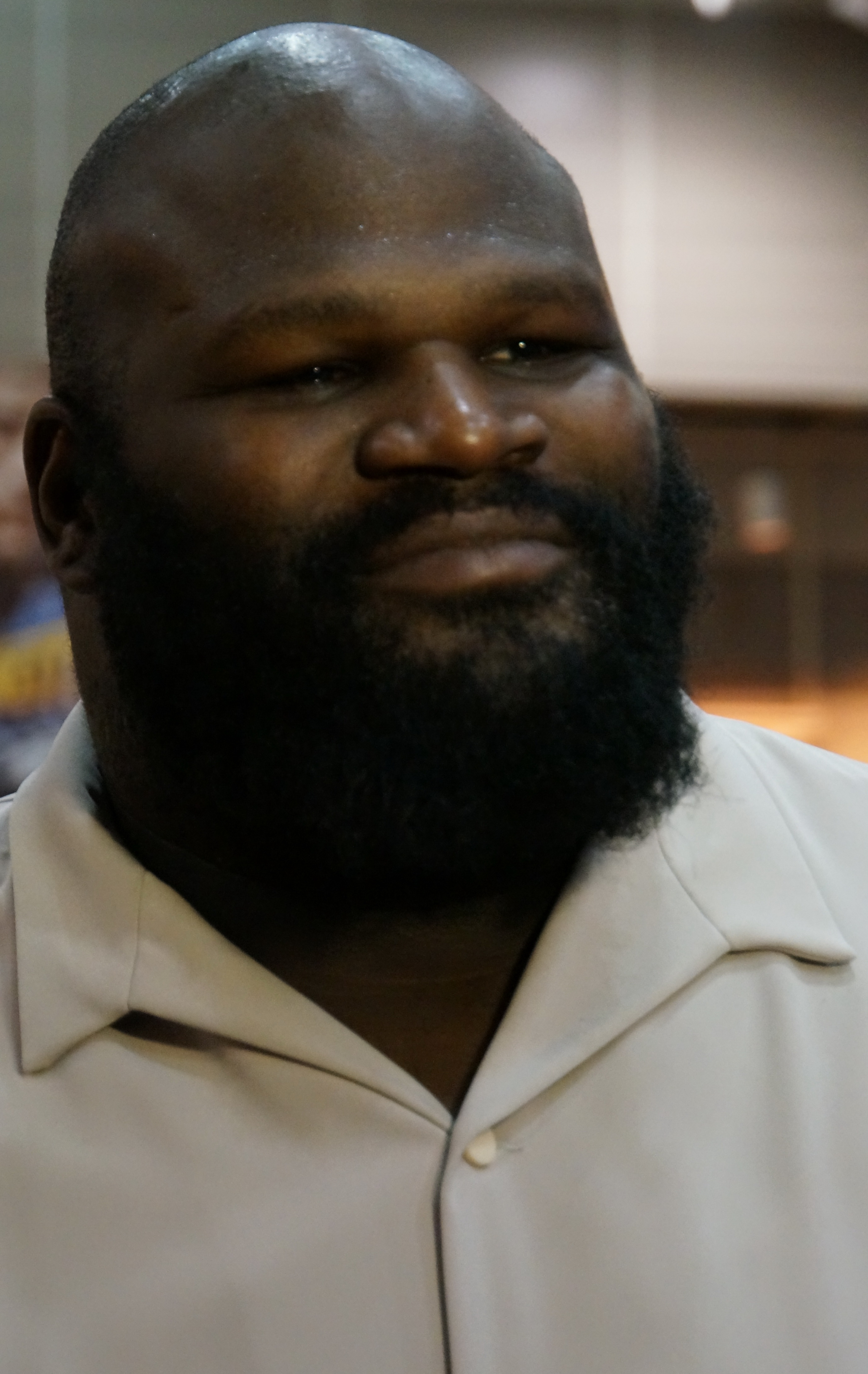
At the event, Mark Henry was unveiled as an analyst for AEW's new show Rampage

Next, Miro defended the AEW TNT Championship against Lance Archer (accompanied by Jake Roberts). Miro forced Archer to submit to the "Game Over" to retain the title.

Afterwards, Hikaru Shida defended the AEW Women's World Championship against Dr. Britt Baker D.M.D (accompanied by Rebel). Baker forced Shida to submit to the "Lockjaw" to win the title and end Shida's record-setting reign at 372 days.

Next, Darby Allin and Sting took on Ethan Page and Scorpio Sky. Sting performed the "Scorpion Death Drop" on Sky to win the match.

In the penultimate match, Kenny Omega defended the AEW World Championship against Pac and Orange Cassidy in a three-way match. Cassidy pinned Omega after performing the "Orange Punch", but Omega hooked Cassidy into a crucifix pin to retain the title.

After this, commentator Tony Schiavone announced that WWE Hall of Famer Mark Henry would be joining AEW as an analyst for their upcoming show Rampage, which would begin airing in August on TNT.

=== Main event ===
In the main event, The Inner Circle (Chris Jericho, Jake Hager, Sammy Guevara, Santana and Ortiz) faced The Pinnacle (MJF, Shawn Spears, Wardlow, Cash Wheeler and Dax Harwood) in a Stadium Stampede match. If The Inner Circle lost this match, they would be forced to disband. The match started as a cinematic match, pre-recorded over a few days earlier in the week, at TIAA Bank Field, before slowly making its way to nearby Daily's Place, where the match finished live in front of the paying audience. In the end, Guevara performed the "630 Senton" on Spears inside the ring at Daily's Place to win the match.

== Reception ==
Double or Nothing received generally positive reviews from critics. For CBSSports.com, Brent Brookhouse described the event as "one of AEW's strongest pay-per-view cards in their short history", and giving praise to the main event Stadium Stampede match, the three-way AEW World Championship match, the AEW World Tag Team Championship match, and the opening match between Adam Page and Brian Cage. However, he directed criticism to the Rhodes-Ogogo match, and the Casino Battle Royale.

Justin Barrasso of Sports Illustrated wrote that the event had "more than exceeded its mission by showcasing the strength of the AEW brand." He stated that AEW World Tag Team Championship match was his favorite of the night, and also commended the AEW World Championship match, the Darby Allin-Sting vs. Ethan Page-Scorpio Sky tag team match, and the opening match between Adam Page and Brian Cage. On the contrary, he disliked the main event, feeling that it was "built for a movie, not a wrestling card." He also commented that Cody Rhodes's win over Anthony Ogogo was "likely to draw some negative reactions".

Writing for Pro Wrestling Torch, Wade Keller also liked the event and mused that the show "will be remembered for years for many reasons", and also enjoyed the show's short length, stating that it "flew by". Adam Page-Brian Cage was a "really good match", the AEW World Tag Team Championship match was "great", and the Casino Battle Royale was "really fun". He also gave praise to the pre-show match between Serena Deeb and Riho, but criticized several aspects of the show, including the "convoluted finish" of the AEW World Championship three-way, the match between Cody Rhodes and Anthony Ogogo, the main problem of which was that "the crowd just didn't care that much", and also the Stadium Stampede match, which he described as "a mix of good and bad".

Sports journalist Dave Meltzer of the Wrestling Observer Newsletter assigned star ratings to the event, with the highest rated match being the AEW World Tag Team Championship, which was rated 4 3/4 stars. The next highest rated matches were the AEW World Championship three-way match, and the Adam Page-Brian Cage match, both of which received a 4 1/2 star rating.

Meltzer would also report that the event drew 4,700 paid fans, with a total of 5,200 people in attendance. He also estimated that Double or Nothing received anywhere from 135,000 to 150,000 pay-per-view buys, with a total revenue of $6.3 million, and a $300,000 gate.

== Aftermath ==
On June 4, it was announced that the Casino Battle Royale winner Jungle Boy would challenge Kenny Omega for the AEW World Championship on the June 26 episode of Dynamite. Omega defeated Jungle Boy to retain the title.

After losing to The Young Bucks, Jon Moxley went on paternity leave for the birth of his daughter.

Double or Nothing would be AEW's last pay-per-view to be held at Daily's Place during the pandemic. In July, the promotion resumed live touring with their next PPV, All Out, scheduled to be held in September in Hoffman Estates, Illinois.

== Results ==
No.	Results	Stipulations	Times
1^{P}	Serena Deeb (c) defeated Riho by submission	Singles match for the NWA World Women's Championship	14:05
2	"Hangman" Adam Page defeated Brian Cage	Singles match	12:00
3	The Young Bucks (Matt Jackson and Nick Jackson) (c) (with Brandon Cutler) defeated Jon Moxley and Eddie Kingston	Tag team match for the AEW World Tag Team Championship	21:00
4	Jungle Boy won by last eliminating Christian Cage	Casino Battle Royale for a future AEW World Championship match	23:30
5	Cody Rhodes (with Arn Anderson) defeated Anthony Ogogo (with Q. T. Marshall)	Singles match	10:55
6	Miro (c) defeated Lance Archer (with Jake Roberts) by technical submission	Singles match for the AEW TNT Championship	9:50
7	Dr. Britt Baker, D.M.D. defeated Hikaru Shida (c) by submission	Singles match for the AEW Women's World Championship	17:20
8	Sting and Darby Allin defeated Men of the Year (Ethan Page and Scorpio Sky)	Tag team match	12:30
9	Kenny Omega (c) defeated Orange Cassidy and Pac	Three-way match for the AEW World Championship	27:00
10	The Inner Circle (Chris Jericho, Jake Hager, Sammy Guevara, Santana and Ortiz) defeated The Pinnacle (Cash Wheeler, Dax Harwood, MJF, Shawn Spears and Wardlow) (with Tully Blanchard)	Stadium Stampede match Had The Inner Circle lost, they would have been forced to disband.	31:30
(c) / – the champion(s) heading into the match; P / – the match was broadcast on the pre-show

=== Casino Battle Royale entrances and eliminations ===
Draw	Entrant	Order	Eliminated by	Eliminations
Clubs	Christian Cage	20	Jungle Boy	4
Clubs	Matt Sydal	1	Max Caster	0
Clubs	Powerhouse Hobbs	15	Christian Cage	1
Clubs	Dustin Rhodes	6	Powerhouse Hobbs	2
Clubs	Max Caster	2	Christian Cage	1
Diamonds	Isiah Kassidy	17	Jungle Boy	2
Diamonds	Matt Hardy	19	Christian Cage	3
Diamonds	Preston Vance	5	Dustin Rhodes	1
Diamonds	Nick Comoroto	4	Dustin Rhodes	0
Diamonds	Serpentico	3	Preston "10" Vance	0
Hearts	Brian Pillman Jr.	10	Isiah Kassidy and Marq Quen	1
Hearts	Griff Garrison	9	Matt Hardy	1
Hearts	Colt Cabana	7	Isiah Kassidy	0
Hearts	Anthony Bowens	8	Brian Pillman Jr. and Griff Garrison	0
Hearts	Penta El Zero Miedo	14	Jungle Boy	1
Spades
Spades	Jungle Boy	—	Winner	3
Spades	Marq Quen	18	Christian Cage	1
Spades	Aaron Solo	11	Lee Johnson	0
Spades	Evil Uno	13	Penta El Zero Miedo	0
Spades	Lee Johnson	12	Matt Hardy	1
Joker	Lio Rush	16	Matt Hardy	0

== See also ==
- 2021 in professional wrestling
