= Double or Nothing (2020) =

All Elite Wrestling pay-per-view event

- Promotional poster featuring Mike Tyson and various AEW wrestlers
- Promotion: All Elite Wrestling
- Date: May 23, 2020
- City: Jacksonville, Florida
- Venue: Daily's Place; TIAA Bank Field
- Attendance: 0 (behind closed doors) (Note: The event was held without a paying audience due to the COVID-19 pandemic in the United States, though a few AEW wrestlers and staff members appeared in the crowd.)
- Buy rate: 115,000–120,000

Pay-per-view chronology
← Previous; Revolution	Next → All Out

Double or Nothing chronology
← Previous; 2019	Next → 2021

The 2020 Double or Nothing was the second annual Double or Nothing professional wrestling pay-per-view (PPV) event produced by All Elite Wrestling (AEW). It took place during Memorial Day weekend on May 23, 2020, in Jacksonville, Florida. While the majority of the event aired live from Daily's Place, the main event match was pre-recorded from May 22–23 at the nearby TIAA Bank Field. It was the first event to feature the AEW TNT Championship. The event aired through traditional PPV outlets, as well as on B/R Live in North America and FITE TV internationally.

The event was originally scheduled to take place at the MGM Grand Garden Arena in Paradise, Nevada. The venue, however, canceled all events up through May 31 due to the COVID-19 pandemic. AEW moved the event to the Jacksonville Jaguars complex in Jacksonville, Florida, with most matches taking place at Daily's Place—an amphitheater adjacent to TIAA Bank Field—while the main event match took place in the stadium itself, subsequently being the first AEW event to take place in a stadium. It was also the first AEW PPV produced during the pandemic.

Nine matches were contested at the event, including one on The Buy In pre-show. In the main event, Matt Hardy and The Elite (Adam Page, Kenny Omega, Matt Jackson, and Nick Jackson) defeated The Inner Circle (Chris Jericho, Jake Hager, Sammy Guevara, Santana, and Ortiz) in a Stadium Stampede match, which was a cinematic match. In the penultimate match, Jon Moxley defeated Mr. Brodie Lee to retain the AEW World Championship. In other prominent matches, Hikaru Shida defeated Nyla Rose to win the AEW Women's World Championship, Cody defeated Lance Archer to become the inaugural TNT Champion, and in the opening bout, a debuting Brian Cage won the Casino Ladder Match. Additionally, the event featured an appearance from International Boxing Hall of Famer Mike Tyson, who presented the TNT Championship to Cody.

== Production ==
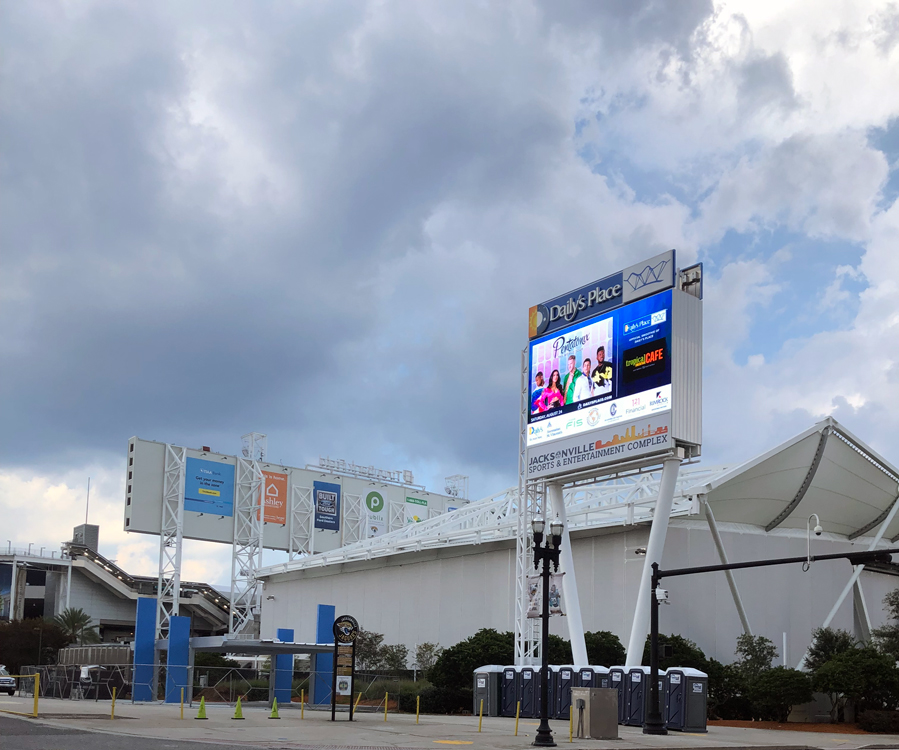
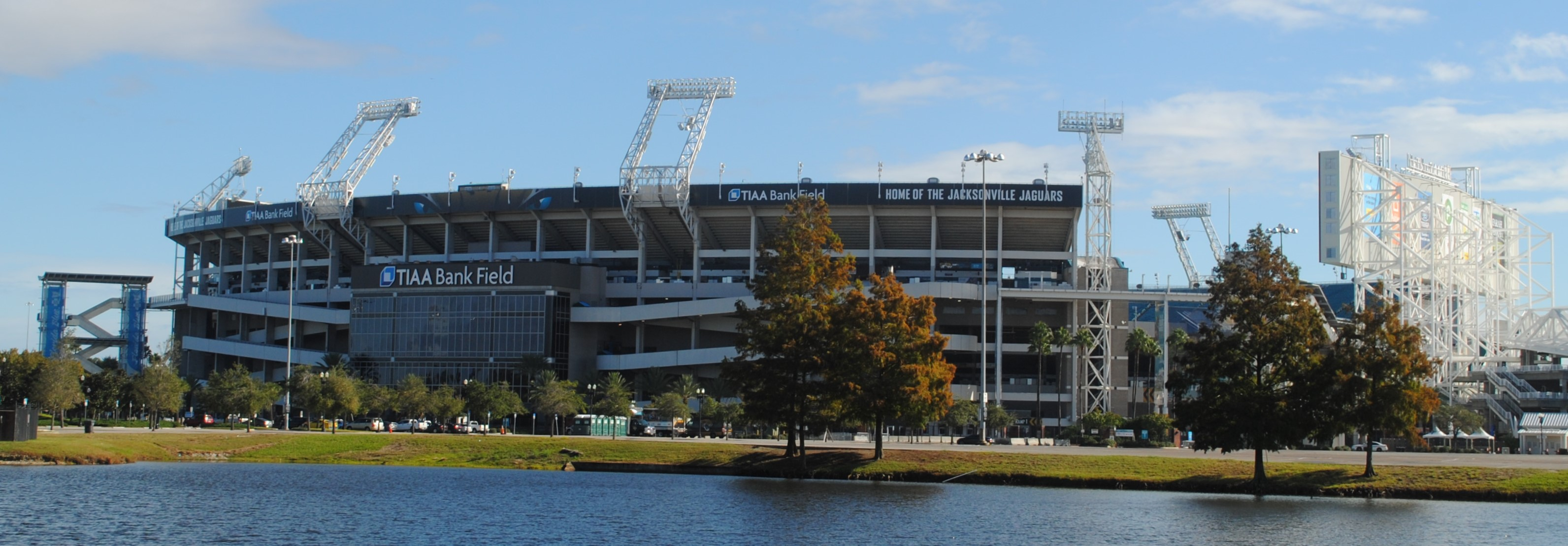
Due to the COVID-19 pandemic, the majority of the event was held at Daily's Place (top) with the main event occurring within the adjacent TIAA Bank Field stadium (bottom) in Jacksonville, Florida.

=== Background ===
After the success of the September 2018 event All In, a group known as The Elite (Cody, The Young Bucks, and Kenny Omega), the driving forces behind the professional wrestling event, used the positive response from All In to pursue further events with backing of businessmen Shahid Khan and Tony Khan. This resulted in the foundation of All Elite Wrestling (AEW) in January 2019, and their inaugural pay-per-view (PPV) event, Double or Nothing, was then held on May 25 at the MGM Grand Garden Arena on the Las Vegas Strip, with the event's name also being a reference to its Las Vegas theme.

On February 5, 2020, AEW announced that Double or Nothing would be returning to the same venue on Saturday, May 23 of that year, establishing Double or Nothing as both an annual Memorial Day weekend event, as well as their marquee domestic event. According to the Wrestling Observer Newsletter, Double or Nothing sold around 6,000 tickets on its first day of sale. Double or Nothing is considered as being one of AEW's "Big Four" PPVs, which includes All Out, Full Gear, and Revolution, their four biggest domestic shows produced quarterly.

On May 22, the day before Double or Nothing, TNT aired a one-hour television special previewing the event called Countdown to Double or Nothing, averaging 344,000 viewers.

==== Impact of the COVID-19 pandemic ====
Like all other professional wrestling promotions and sporting events in general, the event was impacted by the COVID-19 pandemic. On April 8, the MGM Grand Garden Arena announced that they had canceled all events up through May 31 due to the pandemic. Nevada had been in a state of emergency since March 12, banning all public gatherings indefinitely. In response, AEW announced that Double or Nothing would still proceed as planned but from an undisclosed location, which was later revealed to be from Daily's Place in Jacksonville, Florida, as well as the adjacent TIAA Bank Field stadium for the main event match. The announcement also confirmed that a third Double or Nothing event would emanate from the MGM Grand Garden Arena on May 29, 2021. In addition to offering refunds, tickets purchased for 2020's show would be valid for the following year's event. However, the 2021 event, which was pushed back a day to May 30, was also moved to Daily's Place due to the ongoing pandemic with all original tickets being refunded.

The concept of the Stadium Stampede match was brought about because of the pandemic and it was pre-recorded as a cinematic match before the event's live broadcast. AEW wrestler Chris Jericho said that filming took nearly 12 hours to complete; filming began in the evening of May 22 and concluded early morning of May 23. Jericho said it was similar to filming a movie.

=== Storylines ===
Double or Nothing featured nine professional wrestling matches that involved different wrestlers from pre-existing scripted feuds and storylines. Storylines were produced on AEW's weekly television program, Dynamite, the supplementary online streaming show, Dark, and The Young Bucks' YouTube series Being The Elite.

On March 30, 2020, AEW announced a new title, the AEW TNT Championship, with the inaugural champion to be determined by an eight-man, single-elimination tournament. The tournament began on the April 8 episode of Dynamite with the final scheduled for Double or Nothing. In the semifinals on the April 29 episode, Cody and Lance Archer defeated Darby Allin and Dustin Rhodes, respectively, setting up the inaugural championship match. It was announced on the May 13 episode that former professional boxer Mike Tyson would present the championship to the winner.

On the May 6 episode of Dynamite, AEW World Champion Jon Moxley defeated Frankie Kazarian in a match. Moments later, members of The Dark Order attacked Moxley, Kazarian, and the latter's stable, SoCal Uncensored (Christopher Daniels and Scorpio Sky). The Dark Order's leader, "The Exalted One" Mr. Brodie Lee then entered the ring and challenged Moxley to an AEW World Championship match, which he accepted and was scheduled for Double or Nothing.

During the May 6 episode of Dynamite, a nine-man ladder match titled the Casino Ladder Match was scheduled for Double or Nothing with the winner receiving a future AEW World Championship match. The rules of the match were revealed the following week. Two wrestlers begin the match and every 90 seconds, another participant enters. The winner is the one who retrieves the casino chip suspended above the ring; the match can be won before all participants have entered. Darby Allin, Colt Cabana, Orange Cassidy, Rey Fénix, Scorpio Sky, Kip Sabian, Frankie Kazarian, and Luchasaurus were confirmed for the match with the final participant to be announced during the match at Double or Nothing. After Fénix suffered an injury on the May 20 episode of Dynamite, it was announced that Joey Janela would take his place.

On the May 13 episode of Dynamite, Hikaru Shida, who was at the top of the rankings in the women's division, defeated Penelope Ford, Kris Statlander, and Dr. Britt Baker, D.M.D. to win a fatal four-way match, keeping her undefeated in 2020. It was then announced that Shida would challenge Nyla Rose for the AEW Women's World Championship at Double or Nothing. Backstage during Shida's interview, Rose attacked Shida with a kendo stick. It was then announced that their match would be a no disqualification and no-countout match.

During the aforementioned women's four-way match, Dr. Britt Baker, D.M.D. attacked Kris Statlander outside the ring and applied the Lockjaw on her, which allowed Hikaru Shida to score the pin over Penelope Ford. Despite the match being over, Baker continued to apply the submission on Statlander. Afterwards, a match between Baker and Statlander was scheduled for Double or Nothing. Due to an injury Baker suffered on the May 20 episode of Dynamite, it was announced that Ford would face Statlander instead.

On the May 20 episode of Dynamite, Shawn Spears, annoyed by not having a match for Double or Nothing, demanded a match against Dustin Rhodes. A match between the two was set for Double or Nothing.

== Event ==
Other on-screen personnel
Role	Name
Commentators	Jim Ross (PPV)
Commentators	Excalibur (Pre-show + PPV)
Commentators	Tony Schiavone (PPV)
Commentators	Taz (Pre-show)
Spanish commentators	Alex Abrahantes
Spanish commentators	Willie Urbina
German commentators	Günter Zapf
German commentators	Mike Ritter
French commentators	Alain Mistrangélo
French commentators	Norbert Feuillan
Ring announcers	Dasha Gonzalez
Ring announcers	Justin Roberts (Stadium Stampede match)
Referees	Aubrey Edwards
Referees	Bryce Remsburg
Referees	Paul Turner
Referees	Rick Knox
Interviewer	Alex Marvez

=== The Buy In ===
On The Buy In pre-show, a match was contested between Best Friends (Trent and Chuck Taylor) and Private Party (Marq Quen and Isiah Kassidy), with the winners becoming the number one contenders for the AEW World Tag Team Championship. Best Friends performed "Strong Zero" on Quen to win the match.

=== Preliminary matches ===
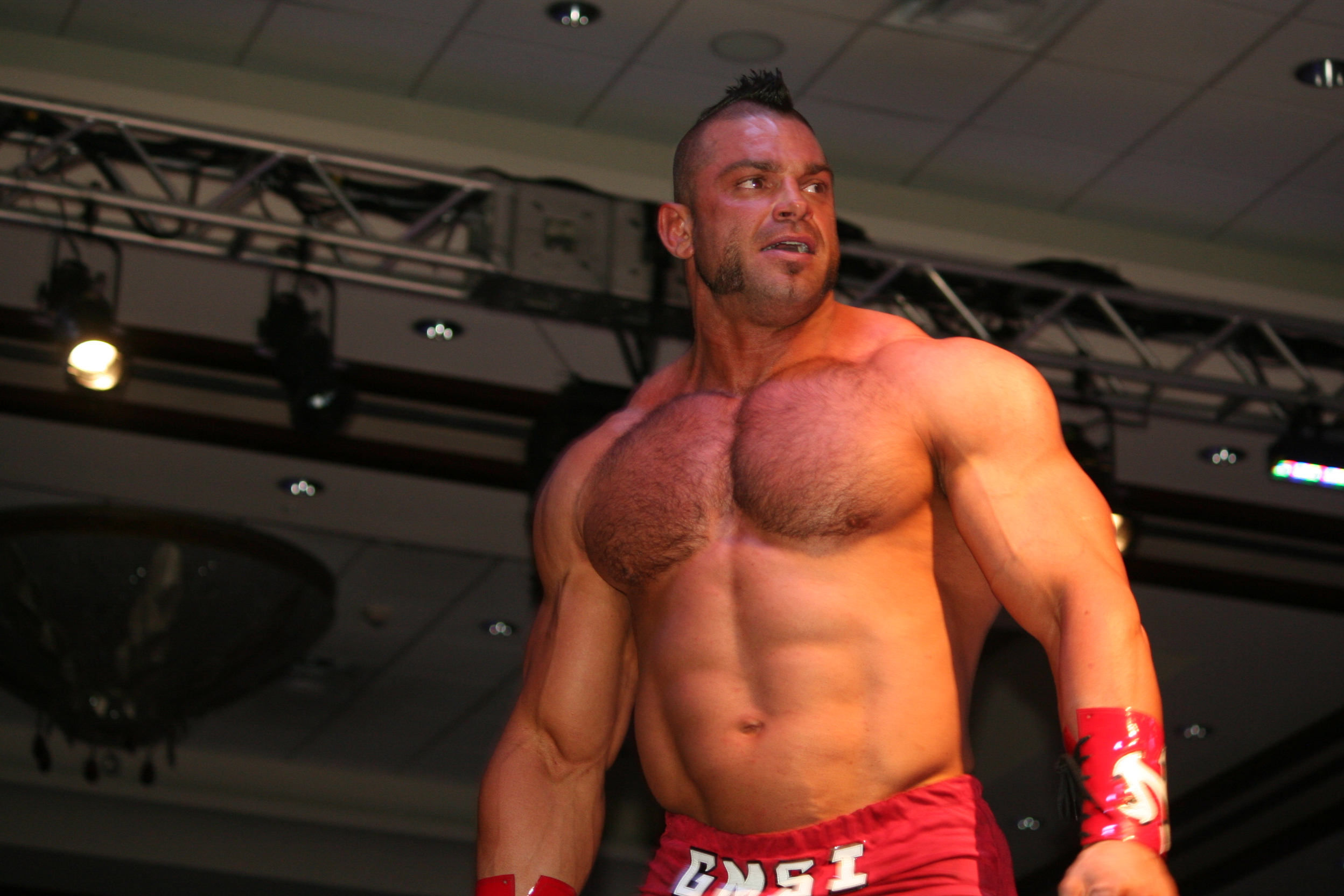
Brian Cage made his AEW debut at Double or Nothing as the mystery participant of the Casino Ladder Match, which he won

The event opened with a nine-man Casino Ladder Match between Colt Cabana, Darby Allin, Joey Janela, Frankie Kazarian, Kip Sabian, Orange Cassidy, Luchasaurus, Scorpio Sky, and a mystery competitor. The rules of the match were that two wrestlers would start the match and every two minutes, a new participant would enter the ring. The objective was to retrieve a giant poker chip hanging above the ring by ascending a ladder to win the match; the match could be won before all participants had entered. Scorpio Sky and Frankie Kazarian started the match. Kip Sabian (accompanied by Penelope Ford and Jimmy Havoc) entered next. Darby Allin was the fourth entrant. Orange Cassidy was the next entrant. The sixth participant was Colt Cabana. Next, Joey Janela entered. The eighth entrant was Luchasaurus. The final participant was revealed to be Brian Cage (accompanied by Taz), making his AEW debut. Cage incapacitated everyone in the ring and later retrieved the poker chip, winning the match and earning a future AEW World Championship match.

The second match was a singles match between MJF and Jungle Boy. MJF emerged victorious after pinning Jungle Boy with a roll-up while holding his tights, giving him extra leverage.

Next, Cody (accompanied by Arn Anderson) and Lance Archer (accompanied by Jake Roberts) competed in the tournament final to crown the inaugural AEW TNT Champion. The winner would be presented the title belt by former boxer Mike Tyson. After interference, both Anderson and Roberts were ejected by the referee. In the end, Cody performed two cutters on Archer to win the match and championship. Afterwards, Tyson handed him the championship and celebrated his victory.

Following this, Kris Statlander faced Penelope Ford. Statlander performed a "Big Bang Theory" piledriver on Ford to win.

Afterwards, Dustin Rhodes (accompanied by Brandi Rhodes) competed against Shawn Spears. Rhodes performed a "Final Reckoning" suplex on Spears for the victory.

In the following match, Nyla Rose defended the AEW Women's World Championship against Hikaru Shida in a No Disqualification, No Countout match. Shida hit Rose with a kendo stick and then performed a running knee to win the match and championship.

=== Main event ===
In the first of two main events, Jon Moxley defended the AEW World Championship against Mr. Brodie Lee. Late in the match, Moxley performed a "Paradigm Shift" through the stage. After they recovered, Moxley forced Lee to pass out to a chokehold, giving the win to Moxley by technical submission to retain the championship.

=== Second main event ===
The post event was a Stadium Stampede match between The Elite (Adam Page, Kenny Omega and The Young Bucks) and "Broken" Matt Hardy and The Inner Circle (Chris Jericho, Jake Hager, Sammy Guevara, Santana and Ortiz). The match was contested from TIAA Bank Field. After fighting throughout the stadium, Omega performed a "One Winged Angel" electric chair driver on Guevara from the stadium seats onto a platform below to win the match for his team.

== Aftermath ==
During the post-event media scrum, AEW president Tony Khan announced that Brian Cage, the winner of the Casino Ladder Match, would receive his AEW World Championship match against Jon Moxley at Fyter Fest, a special episode of Dynamite.

On the following episode of Dynamite, new TNT Champion Cody stated that he would be holding a weekly open challenge for the title. A battle royal was held that night to determine Cody's first challenger for the following week, which was won by Jungle Boy. Cody defeated Jungle Boy to retain the championship on the following week's episode of Dynamite.

== Reception ==
Double or Nothing received generally positive reviews. Jason Powell of Pro Wrestling Dot Net called it a "fun empty venue show", with particular praise being given to the Stadium Stampede match. CBSSports.com's Brent Brookhouse stated that AEW had "delivered a show that was entertaining top-to-bottom", with the main event being "one of the wildest matches of the year". He gave the Stadium Stampede match an "A−" grade, while the AEW World Championship and AEW Women's World Championship matches both received a "B" grade, and the inaugural AEW TNT Championship match was assigned a "C" grade.

For Slam! Sports, a subsection of Canadian Online Explorer, Nick Tylwalk wrote that the Stadium Stampede main event took "entertainment to a new level" and rated the event an overall score 8 out of 10, with the main event match itself receiving 10 out of 10. The Moxley-Lee match was given 9 out of 10, the Rose-Shida match was designated an 8 out of 10 and the Cody-Archer match was allocated a 6 out of 10.

Justin Barrasso of Sports Illustrated also liked the event and described the Stadium Stampede match as "uniquely distinct" and "unlike anything ever before on display in wrestling." Barrasso also commented that it was "awfully quick" for Lance Archer to lose to Cody due to being "new to [the] company". Despite this, "even in defeat, Archer looked tremendous, presenting himself as a monster". Barrasso's other takeaways from the event were that Hikura Shida "showed off further dimensions of her wrestling ability" during "her breakout performance" against Nyla Rose and MJF-Jungle Boy was "laid out well", with praise given to both competitors' performances.

== Results ==
No.	Results	Stipulations	Times
1^{P}	Best Friends (Chuck Taylor and Trent) defeated Private Party (Isiah Kassidy and Marq Quen)	Tag team match to determine the #1 contenders for the AEW World Tag Team Championship	15:10
2	Brian Cage (with Taz) defeated Darby Allin, Colt Cabana, Orange Cassidy, Joey Janela, Scorpio Sky, Kip Sabian (with Jimmy Havoc and Penelope Ford), Frankie Kazarian, and Luchasaurus	Casino Ladder Match for a future AEW World Championship match	28:30
3	MJF (with Wardlow) defeated Jungle Boy	Singles match	17:20
4	Cody (with Arn Anderson) defeated Lance Archer (with Jake Roberts)	Tournament final for the inaugural AEW TNT Championship	22:00
5	Kris Statlander defeated Penelope Ford (with Kip Sabian)	Singles match	5:30
6	Dustin Rhodes (with Brandi Rhodes) defeated Shawn Spears	Singles match	3:20
7	Hikaru Shida defeated Nyla Rose (c)	No Disqualification, No Countout match for the AEW Women's World Championship	16:40
8	Jon Moxley (c) defeated Mr. Brodie Lee by technical submission	Singles match for the AEW World Championship	15:30
9	Matt Hardy and The Elite ("Hangman" Adam Page, Kenny Omega, Matt Jackson and Nick Jackson) defeated The Inner Circle (Chris Jericho, Jake Hager, Sammy Guevara, Santana and Ortiz)	Stadium Stampede match	34:00
(c) / – the champion(s) heading into the match; P / – the match was broadcast on the pre-show

=== TNT Championship tournament bracket ===
The first half of the TNT Championship Tournament bracket was announced on the March 31, 2020, episode of Dark, with the second half revealed on the following night's Dynamite. The tournament began on the April 8 episode of Dynamite and concluded at Double or Nothing on May 23.

Quarterfinals; Dynamite (April 8, 15, 22, 2020)
Cody	Pin
Shawn Spears	21:38
Sammy Guevara	10:50
Darby Allin	Pin
Dustin Rhodes	Pin
Kip Sabian	14:10
Colt Cabana	12:42
Lance Archer	Pin

Semifinals; Dynamite (April 29, 2020)
Cody	Pin
Darby Allin	20:10
Dustin Rhodes	22:45
Lance Archer	Pin

Final; Double or Nothing (May 23, 2020)
Cody	Pin
Lance Archer	22:00

== See also ==
- 2020 in professional wrestling
- List of All Elite Wrestling pay-per-view events
