= The Pinnacle (professional wrestling) =

- The Pinnacle's Logo

Statistics
- Leader: MJF
- Members: Wardlow; Shawn Spears; Dax Harwood; Cash Wheeler; Tully Blanchard (Manager)
- Name: The Pinnacle
- Debut: March 10, 2021
- Disbanded: June 1, 2022
- Years active: 2021–2022

The Pinnacle was a professional wrestling stable formed in the professional wrestling promotion All Elite Wrestling (AEW). The group, which was formed in March 2021, consisted of FTR (Dax Harwood and Cash Wheeler), Shawn Spears, and Wardlow. The group's original incarnation was led by Maxwell Jacob Friedman (MJF) and also had Tully Blanchard as a manager.

In March 2022, Wardlow would leave the group after betraying MJF, Blanchard left after being fired by FTR, and FTR themselves would quietly end their association with the team. After quietly disbanding in June 2022, the group re-united briefly in October without Friedman and Blanchard.

== History ==
=== Origins ===
During the early days of AEW, Tully Blanchard joined the company as the on-screen manager of Shawn Spears. He later took a hiatus due to COVID-19, but return a few months later in Spears's corner, as well as that of the tag team FTR, the latter of which has received a lot of comparisons with Blanchard's former tag team with fellow Four Horseman stablemate Arn Anderson, The Brain Busters. However, FTR and Spears never appeared on-screen together despite it being acknowledged that Blanchard was managing both.

Starting in late 2020, Maxwell Jacob Friedman (MJF) was seeking to join The Inner Circle, another stable in AEW led by Chris Jericho. Jericho agreed to allow MJF to join the stable if he beat him in a match at that year's Full Gear, broadcast on November 7. MJF beat Jericho and was subsequently inducted into The Inner Circle along with his bodyguard, Wardlow. MJF competed as a member of the stable for the next several months, during which time there were suspicions that he was planning some sort of takeover of the stable, meeting privately with fellow team members Jake Hager, Santana and Ortiz. On the February 10, 2021 episode of AEW Dynamite, Sammy Guevara left the faction following a confrontation with MJF.

=== History ===
On the Dynamite episode The Crossroads (aired March 3), Spears and FTR were united on screen with Blanchard for the first time with former Four Horseman manager J. J. Dillon making a guest appearance; likewise, Arn Anderson (who was serving as the "coach" of Cody Rhodes) came out and acknowledged the group with everyone putting up the signature Four Horseman hand signal. At Revolution (aired March 7), the tag team of MJF and Jericho failed to beat The Young Bucks for the AEW World Tag Team Championship, following which, Jericho announced a "War Council", where The Inner Circle members would discuss the future of the stable. At the War Council, Guevara returned to the group and it was revealed that MJF had been planning a coup. However, after the other members of the group revealed that they were still loyal to Jericho, MJF announced that he was actually building his own stable. Following this reveal, the lights went out in the arena, and when they came back on, Tully Blanchard, Dax Harwood, Shawn Spears, Wardlow, and Cash Wheeler had appeared in the ring and subsequently beat up the members of The Inner Circle.

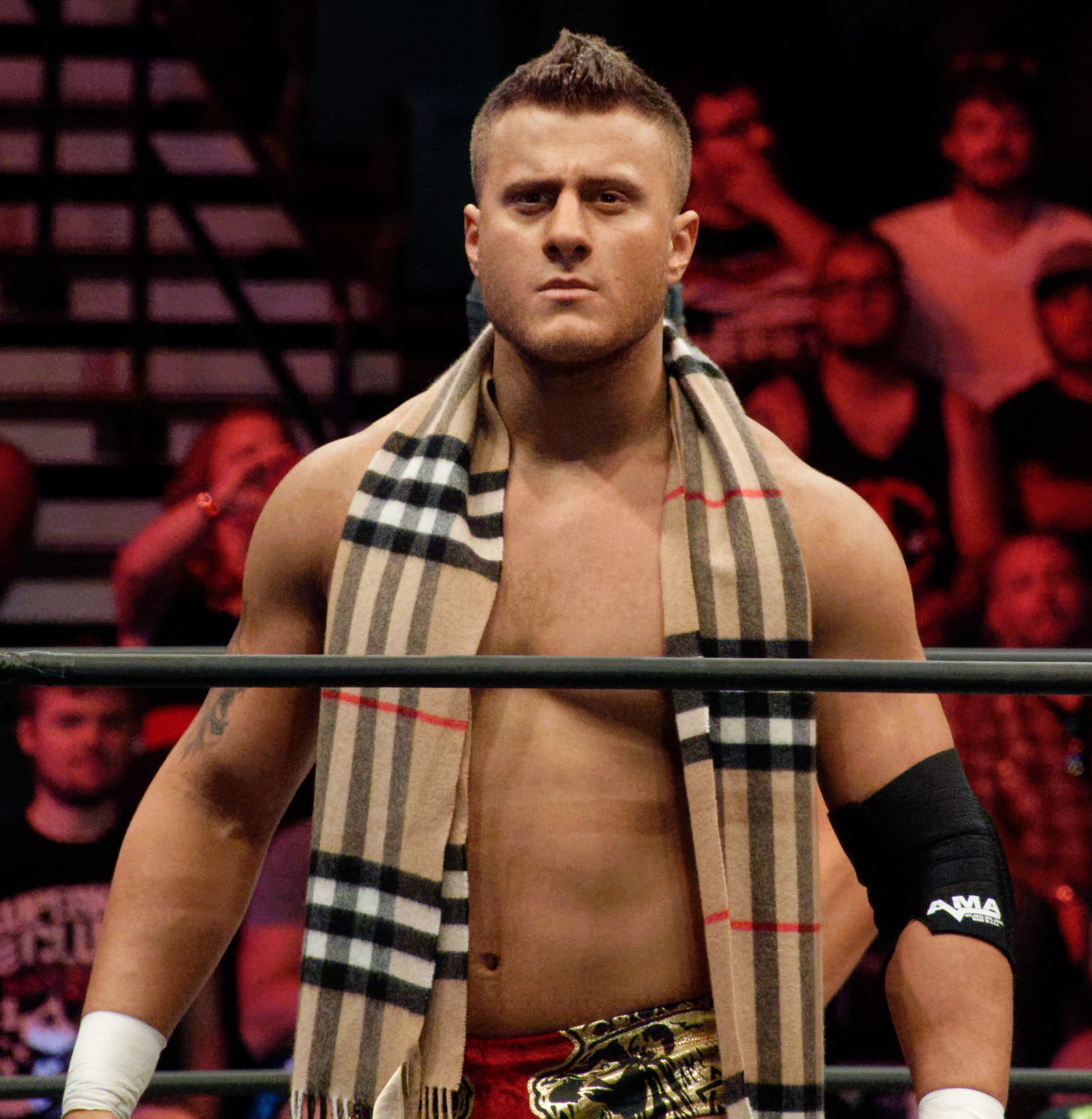
Maxwell Jacob Friedman, the group's leader, in 2019

The faction was formally introduced on the March 17 episode of Dynamite, with MJF and Blanchard announcing that the stable would be known as The Pinnacle. The previous day, AEW had filed to trademark the name of the stable. During the announcement, Blanchard recounted how, during his time as part of The Four Horsemen stable, he felt like he was at "the pinnacle" of wrestling, explaining that the new stable was similarly "at the pinnacle of this sport".

At AEW Blood and Guts, the Pinnacle defeated the Inner Circle in a Blood and Guts match, after Inner Circle member Sammy Guevara surrendered.

At AEW Double or Nothing however, the Pinnacle were defeated by the Inner Circle in a Stadium Stampede match. If the Pinnacle had defeated the Inner Circle, the whole team would have to disband.

Throughout early 2022, signs of tension between Wardlow and the Pinnacle (primarily MJF, who Wardlow was contracted to, and Shawn Spears) would appear, as Wardlow began to exhibit babyface tendencies in singles matches, garnering support from the fanbase, while showing discomfort with some of MJF's actions. This culminated at Revolution during MJF's match with CM Punk, where he refused to assist MJF, feigning the misplacement of the Dynamite Diamond Ring, and instead gave it to Punk, cementing his face turn. His dissociation from the group was confirmed on the March 9 episode of Dynamite. On the same episode, FTR also kicked Tully Blanchard out of the group, after an argument during a backstage segment.

In August 2022, FTR and Wardlow reunited one time only for a trios match, using The Pinnacle name. FTR and Wardlow started a feud with Jay Lethal, Sonjay Dutt, and Satnam Singh. The two trios met in a match at All Out (2022) with FTR and Wardlow picking up the win. Shawn Spears re-joined The Pinnacle on the October 12, 2022 episode of Dynamite after a five-month hiatus from appearing at AEW events. Spears returned using his “Perfect 10” gimmick, which he used in his time in WWE as Tye Dillinger.

== Members ==
*	Founding member
L	Leader
M	Manager

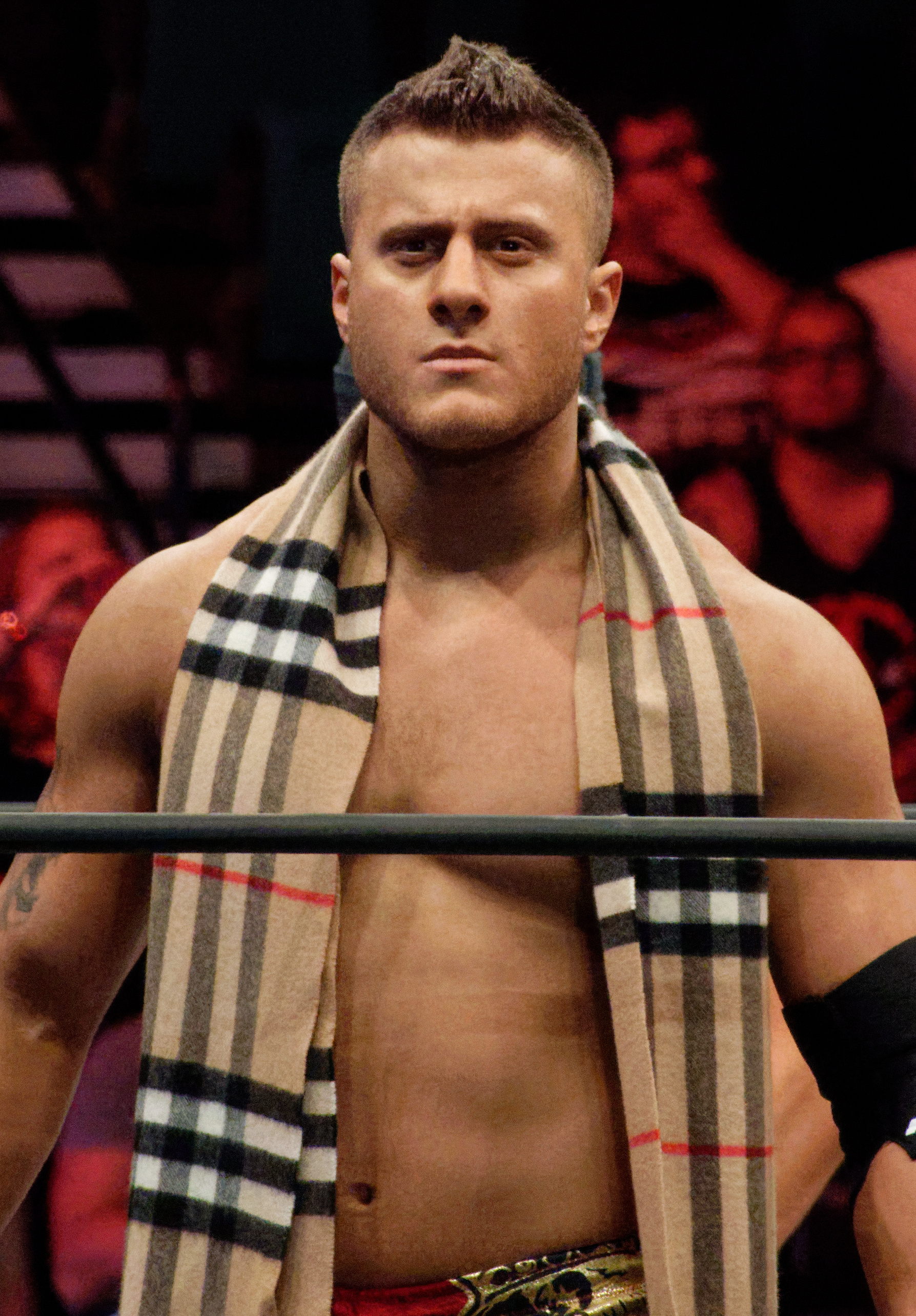
MJF (L)

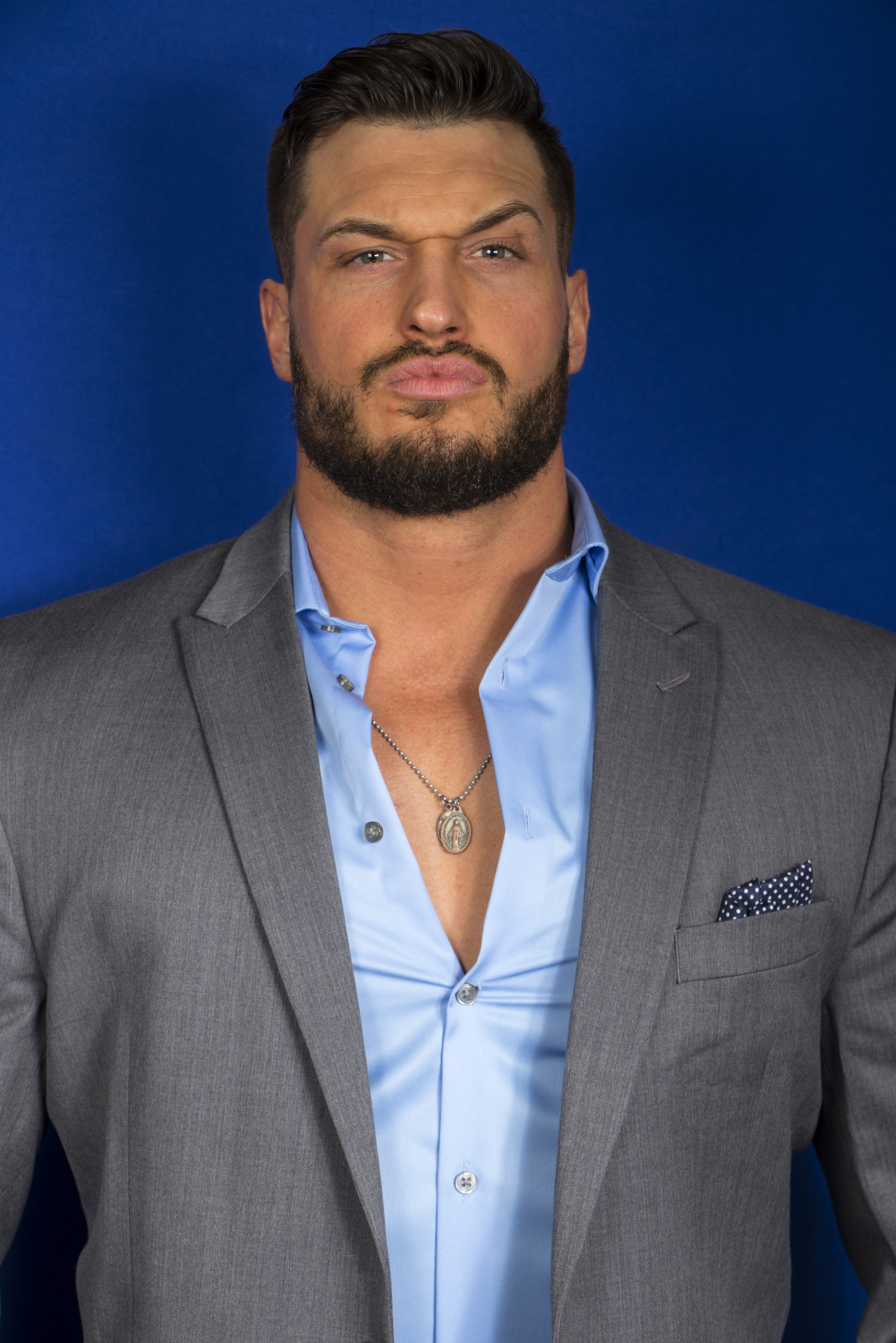
Wardlow

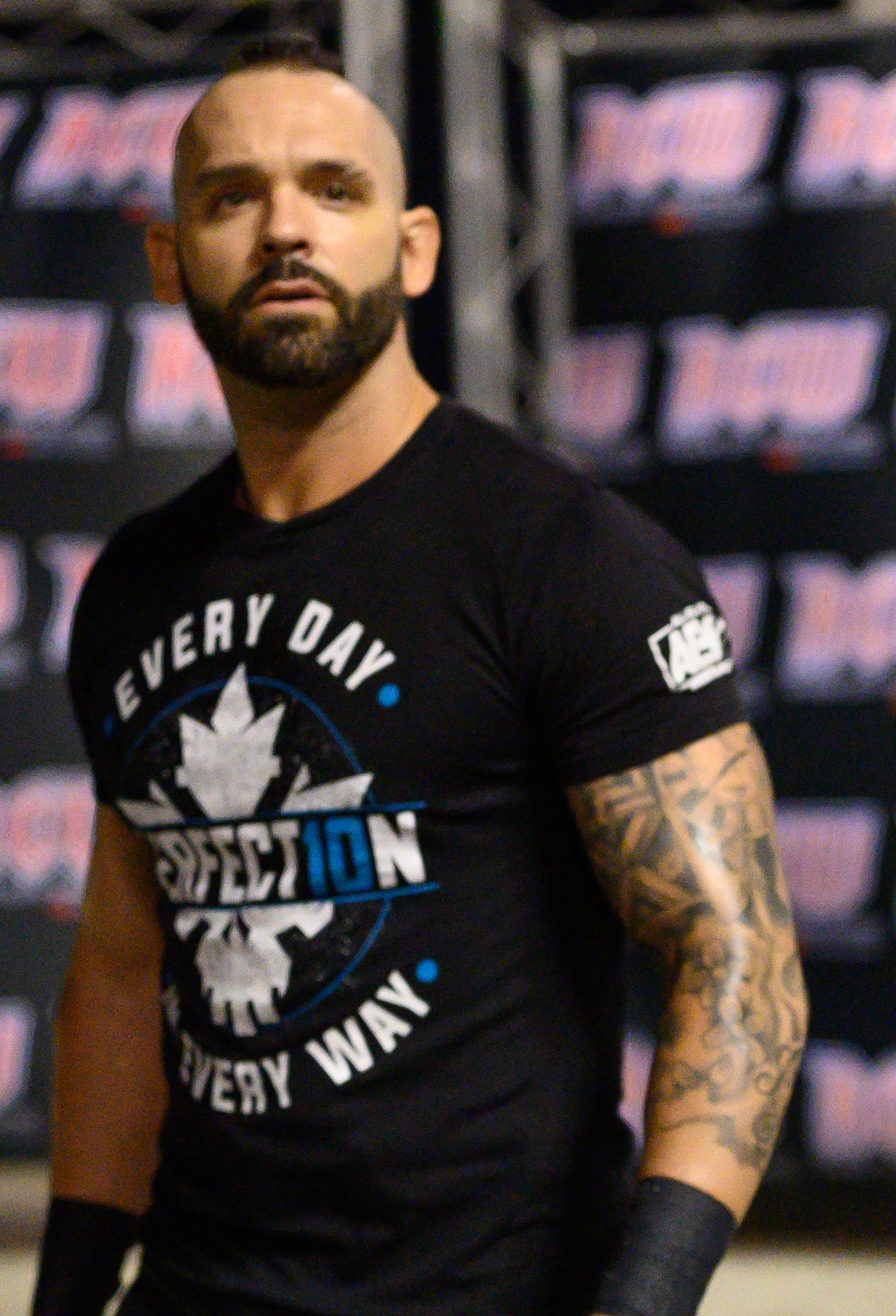
Shawn Spears

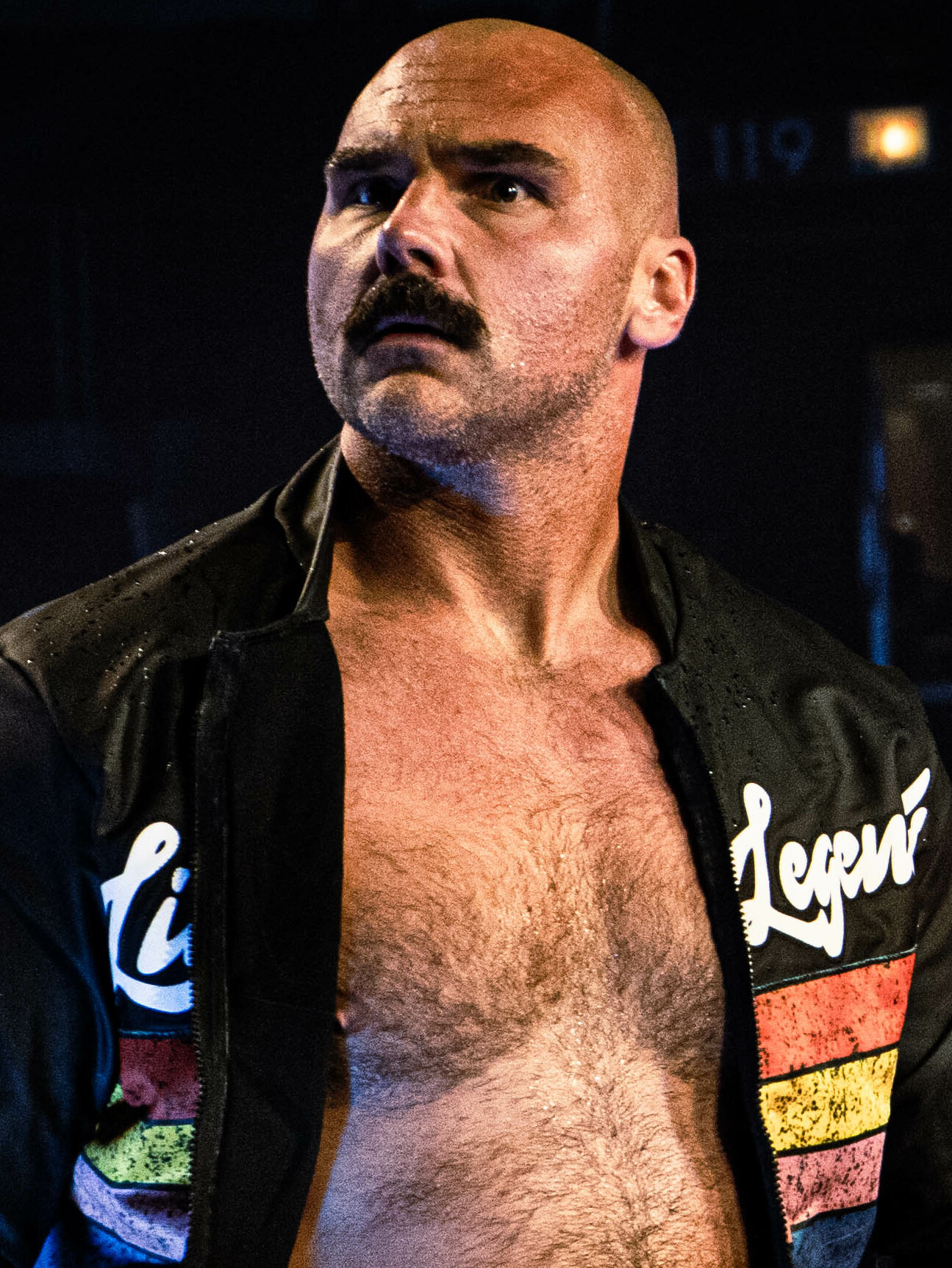
Dax Harwood

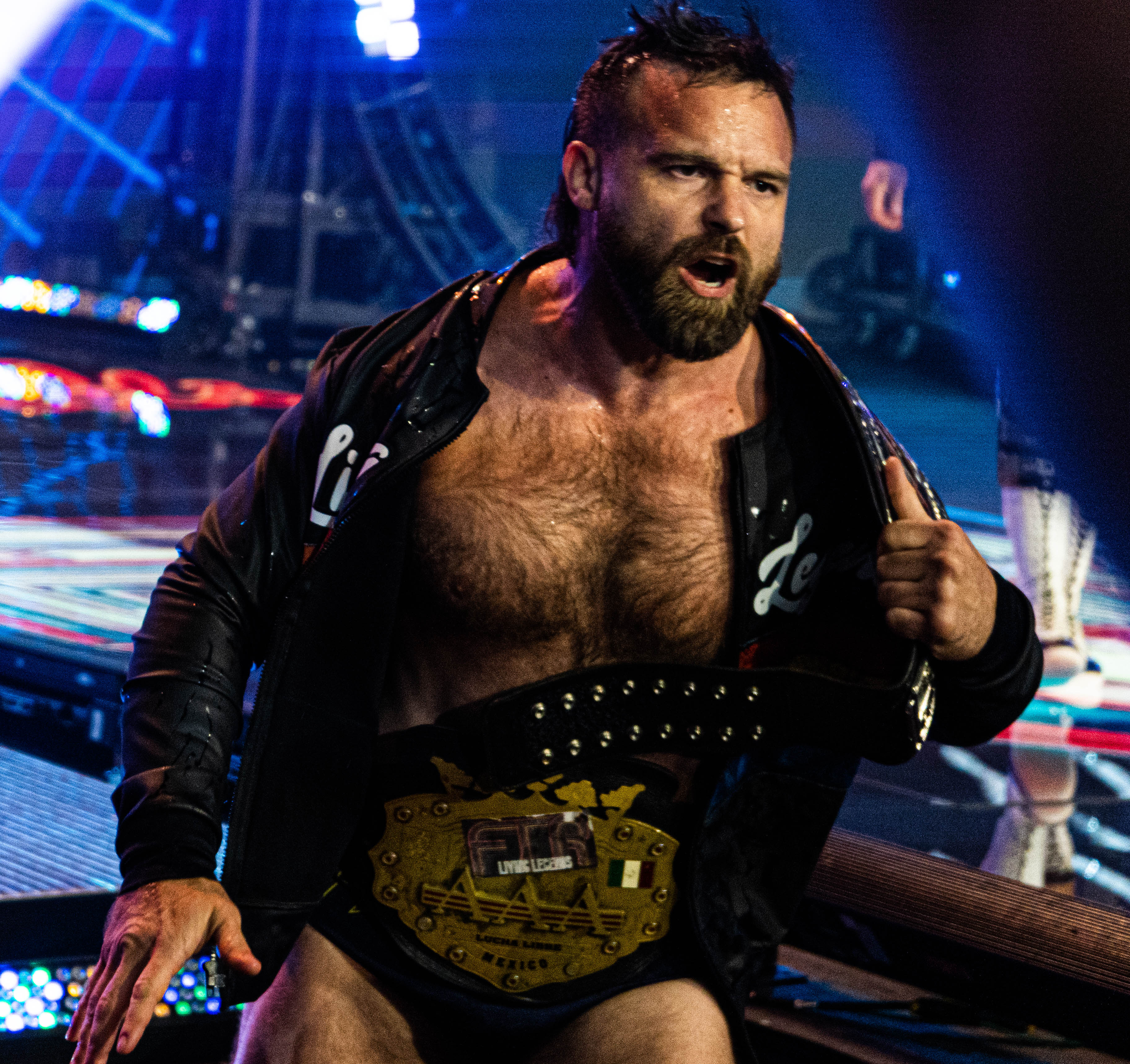
Cash Wheeler

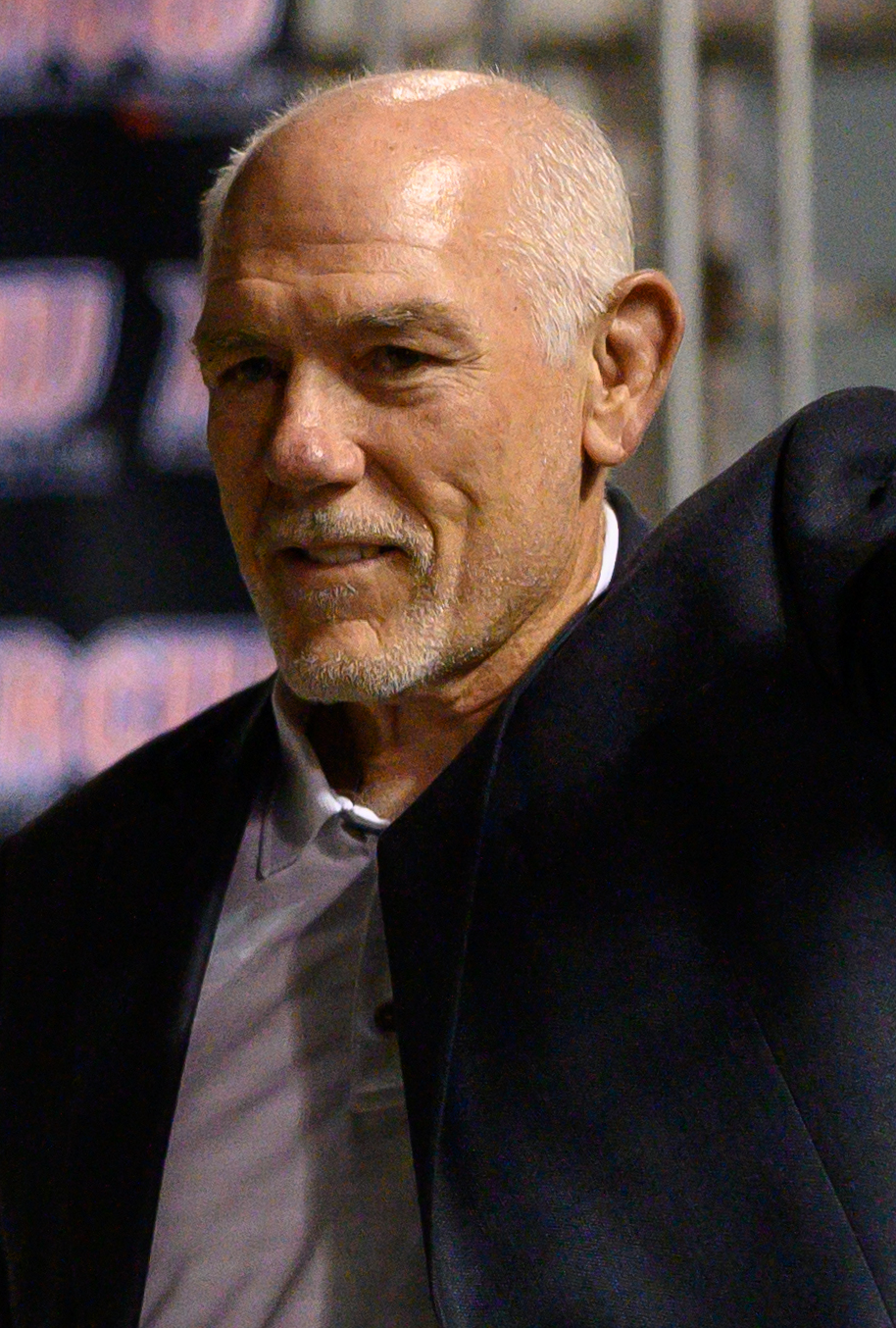
Tully Blanchard (M)

Member		Joined	Left
MJF (L)	*	March 10, 2021	June 1, 2022
Wardlow	*	March 10, 2021	March 6, 2022
Shawn Spears	*	March 10, 2021	June 1, 2022
Dax Harwood	*	March 10, 2021	March 30, 2022
Cash Wheeler	*	March 10, 2021	March 30, 2022
Tully Blanchard (M)	*	March 10, 2021	March 9, 2022

== Sub-groups ==
Affiliate	Members	Tenure	Type
FTR	Dax Harwood and Cash Wheeler	2021–2022	Tag Team

== Championships and accomplishments ==
- All Elite Wrestling
  - Dynamite Diamond Ring (2021) – MJF
  - Face of the Revolution Ladder Match (2022) – Wardlow
- Lucha Libre AAA Worldwide
  - AAA World Tag Team Championship (1 time) – Harwood and Wheeler
- Pro Wrestling Illustrated
  - Feud of the Year (2021) vs. Chris Jericho – MJF
  - Most Hated Wrestler of the Year (2021) – MJF
  - Ranked MJF No. 26 of the top 500 singles wrestlers in the PWI 500 in 2021
  - Ranked Wardlow No. 218 of the top 500 singles wrestlers in the PWI 500 in 2021
  - Ranked Dax Harwood No. 254 of the top 500 singles wrestlers in the PWI 500 in 2021
  - Ranked Cash Wheeler No. 255 of the top 500 singles wrestlers in the PWI 500 in 2021
  - Ranked Shawn Spears No. 270 of the top 500 singles wrestlers in the PWI 500 in 2021
- Ring of Honor
  - ROH World Tag Team Championship (1 time) – Harwood and Wheeler
