= List of AEW World Champions =

Professional wrestling champions

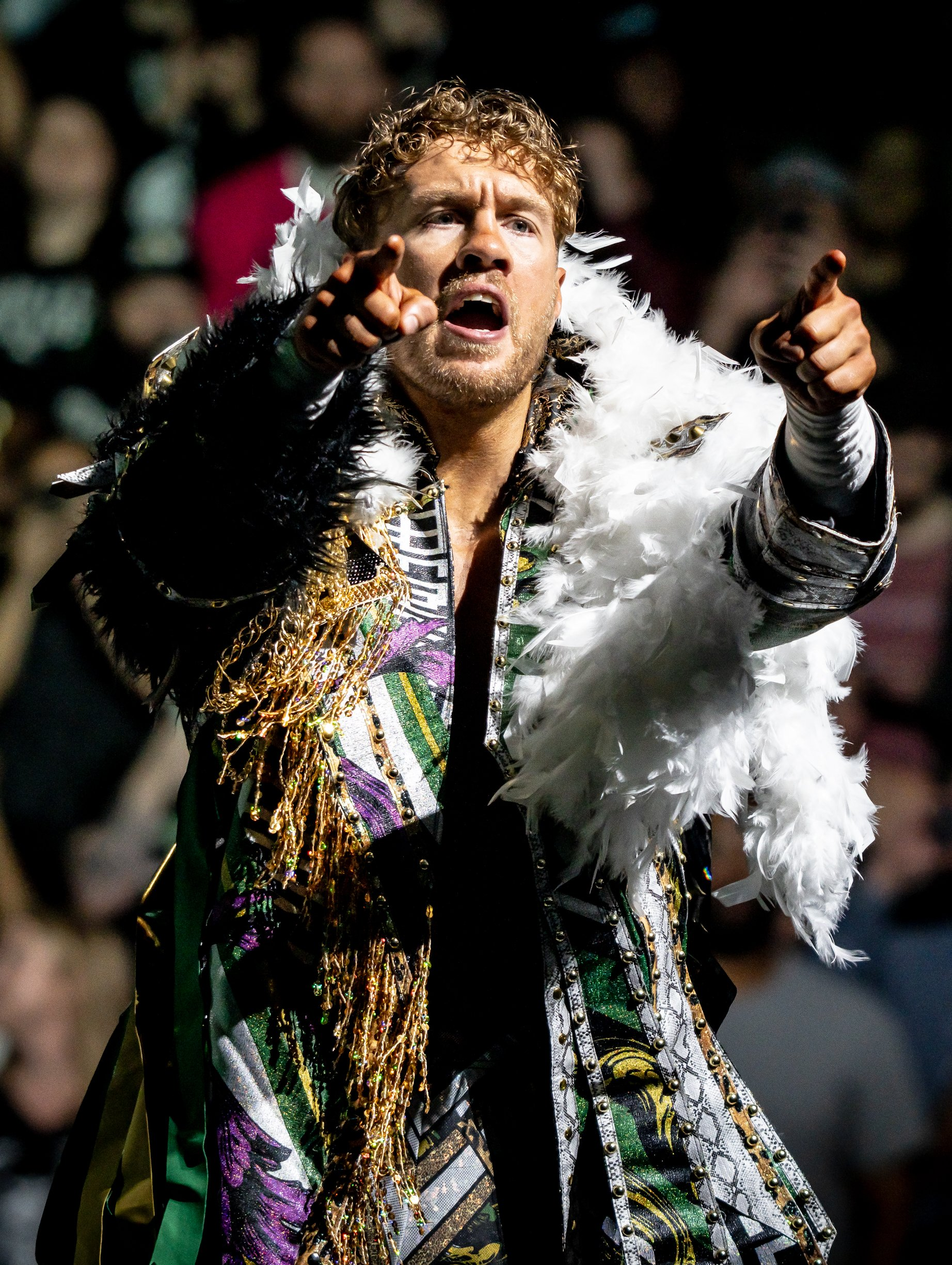
Current champion Will Ospreay

The AEW World Championship is a men's professional wrestling world championship created and promoted by the American promotion All Elite Wrestling (AEW). Unveiled on May 25, 2019, it is the promotion's top championship and is presented as being AEW's most prestigious title.

As of October 28, 2026, there have been 20 reigns between 11 champions and one vacancy, as well as one interim champion. Chris Jericho was the inaugural champion. Jon Moxley has the most reigns at four and also served as the interim champion in mid-2022 while reigning lineal champion CM Punk was out with an injury (this is not counted as one of Moxley's four reigns). Moxley also has the longest combined reign at 620 days. MJF's first reign is the longest singular reign at 406 days, while Punk's second reign is the shortest at 3 days. Jericho is the oldest champion, winning the title at 48 years old, while MJF is the youngest, first winning it at 26 years old.

Will Ospreay is the current champion. He won the title by defeating previous champion Kenny Omega at All In in London, England, on August 30, 2026.

== Title history ==
Name	Years
AEW World Championship	May 25, 2019 – present

Key
No.	Overall reign number
Reign	Reign number for the specific champion
Days	Number of days held
+	Current reign is changing daily

No.	Champion	Championship change			Reign statistics		Notes	Ref.
No.	Champion	Date	Event	Location	Reign	Days	Notes	Ref.
1	Chris Jericho	August 31, 2019	All Out	Hoffman Estates, IL	1	182	Defeated "Hangman" Adam Page to become the inaugural champion.	
2	Jon Moxley	February 29, 2020	Revolution	Chicago, IL	1	277		
3	Kenny Omega	December 2, 2020	Dynamite: Winter Is Coming	Jacksonville, FL	1	346		
4	"Hangman" Adam Page	November 13, 2021	Full Gear	Minneapolis, MN	1	197	This was Page's Casino Poker Chip cash-in match.	
5	CM Punk	May 29, 2022	Double or Nothing	Paradise, NV	1	87		
—	Jon Moxley (Interim)	June 26, 2022	Forbidden Door	Chicago, IL	—	59	Lineal champion CM Punk was originally scheduled to defend the title against Hiroshi Tanahashi at this event, but was pulled due to suffering a foot injury. Moxley defeated Tanahashi in a tournament final to become the interim champion.	
6	Jon Moxley	August 24, 2022	Dynamite	Cleveland, OH	2	11	Defeated lineal champion CM Punk to determine the undisputed champion. AEW officially recognizes this as the start of Moxley's second reign.	
7	CM Punk	September 4, 2022	All Out	Hoffman Estates, IL	2	3		
—	Vacated	September 7, 2022	Dynamite	Buffalo, NY	—	—	CM Punk was stripped of the title after being suspended following a legitimate backstage altercation that occurred during the All Out post-event media scrum. (Note: After Punk's return the following June, he proclaimed himself the "Real World Champion"; this was not an official reign recognized by AEW. After Punk's contract was legitimately terminated by AEW on September 2, 2023, the "Real World Championship" was dropped.)	
8	Jon Moxley	September 21, 2022	Dynamite: Grand Slam	Queens, NY	3	59	Defeated Bryan Danielson in a tournament final for the vacant title.	
9	MJF	November 19, 2022	Full Gear	Newark, NJ	1	406	This was MJF's Casino Poker Chip cash-in match.	
10	Samoa Joe	December 30, 2023	Worlds End	Uniondale, NY	1	113		
11	Swerve Strickland	April 21, 2024	Dynasty	St. Louis, MO	1	126		
12	Bryan Danielson	August 25, 2024	All In	London, England	1	48	This was a Title vs. Career match.	
13	Jon Moxley	October 12, 2024	WrestleDream	Tacoma, WA	4	273		
14	"Hangman" Adam Page	July 12, 2025	All In	Arlington, TX	2	133	This was a Texas Deathmatch.	
15	Samoa Joe	November 22, 2025	Full Gear	Newark, NJ	2	35	This was a Steel Cage match.	
16	MJF	December 27, 2025	Worlds End	Hoffman Estates, IL	2	109	This was a four-way match, also involving Swerve Strickland and "Hangman" Adam Page. This was also MJF's Casino Gauntlet guaranteed championship match.	
17	Darby Allin	April 15, 2026	Dynamite: Spring BreakThru	Everett, WA	1	39		
18	MJF	May 24, 2026	Double or Nothing	Queens, NY	3	45	This was a Title vs. Hair match.	
19	Kenny Omega	July 8, 2026	Dynamite: Beach Break	Clearwater, FL	2	53	This was a Last Chance match.	
20	Will Ospreay	August 30, 2026	All In	London, England	1	59+		

== Combined reigns ==
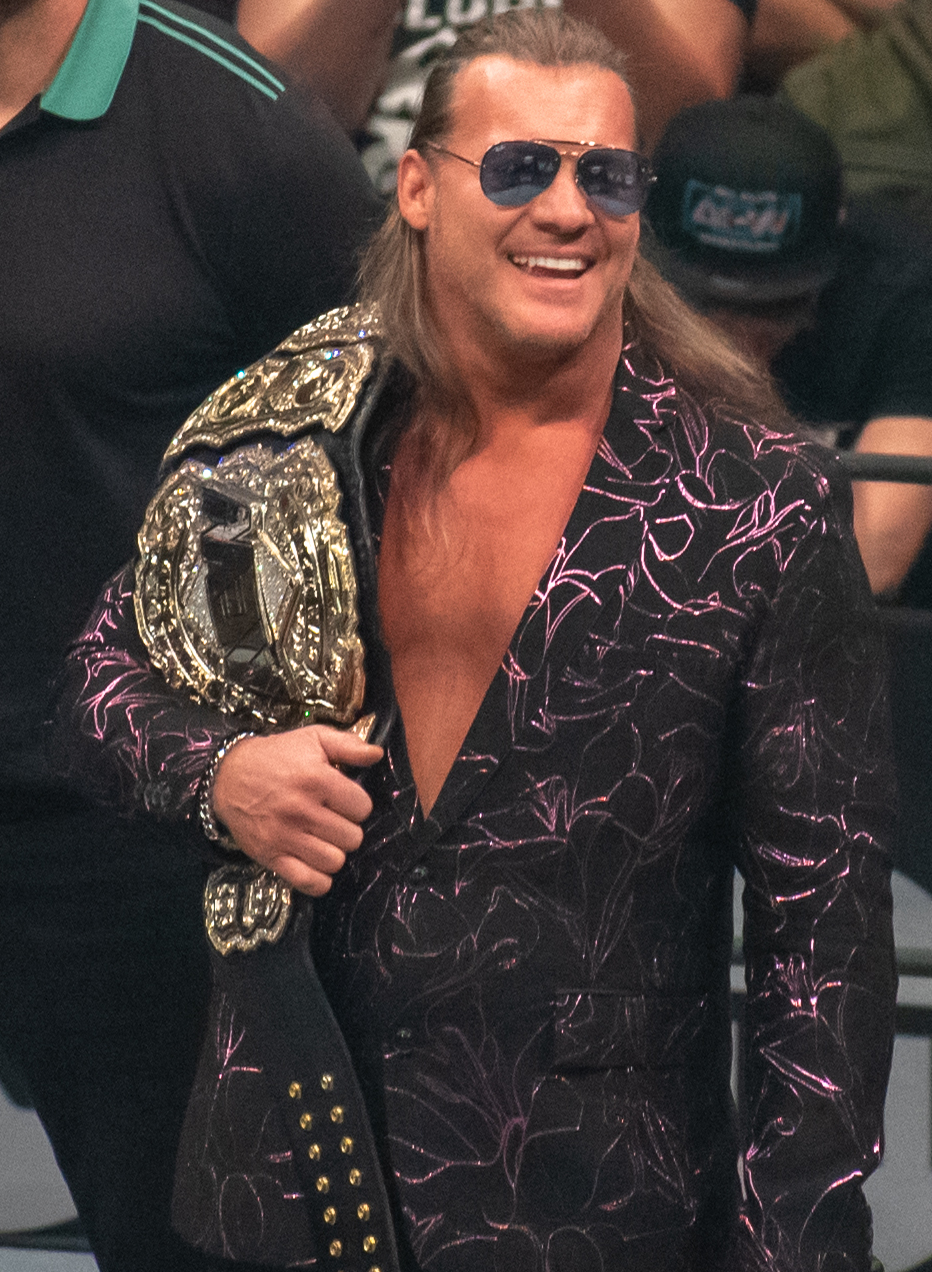
Inaugural and oldest champion Chris Jericho

Record four-time and longest combined reigning champion Jon Moxley, who has held the title for a combined 620 days

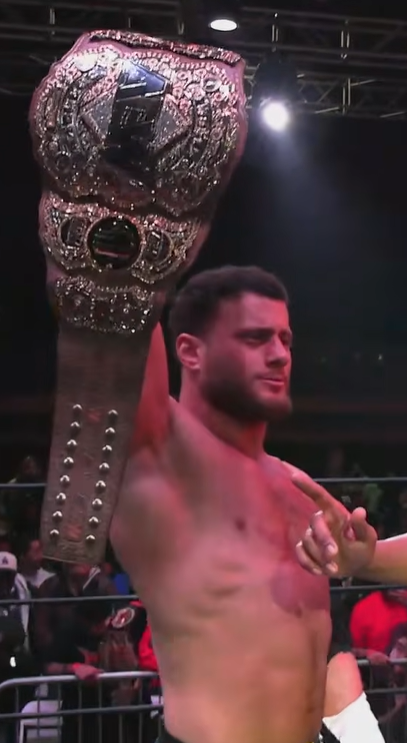
Three-time, youngest, and longest-reigning champion MJF, whose first reign lasted 406 days; the only in history to last over a year

As of October 28, 2026.

†	Indicates the current champion

Rank	Wrestler	No. of reigns	Combined days
1	Jon Moxley	4	620
2	MJF	3	560
3	Kenny Omega	2	399
4	"Hangman" Adam Page	2	330
5	Chris Jericho	1	182
6	Samoa Joe	2	148
7	Swerve Strickland	1	126
8	CM Punk	2	90
9	Will Ospreay †	1	59+
10	Bryan Danielson	1	48
11	Darby Allin	1	39
