= Double or Nothing (2019) =

All Elite Wrestling pay-per-view event

- Promotional poster featuring various AEW personnel
- Promotion: All Elite Wrestling
- Date: May 25, 2019
- City: Paradise, Nevada
- Venue: MGM Grand Garden Arena
- Attendance: 11,000
- Buy rate: 109,000–113,000

Pay-per-view chronology
← Previous; First	Next → Fyter Fest

Double or Nothing chronology
← Previous; First	Next → 2020

The 2019 Double or Nothing was the inaugural Double or Nothing and inaugural professional wrestling pay-per-view (PPV) event produced by All Elite Wrestling (AEW). It took place during Memorial Day weekend on May 25, 2019, at the MGM Grand Garden Arena in the Las Vegas suburb of Paradise, Nevada. The event aired through traditional PPV outlets, as well as on B/R Live in North America and FITE TV internationally.

The card comprised nine matches, including two on the Buy In pre-show. In the main event, Chris Jericho defeated Kenny Omega, earning a match against Adam Page, the winner of the pre-show's Casino Battle Royale, at AEW's August event All Out to determine the inaugural AEW World Champion. Other prominent matches saw The Young Bucks (Matt Jackson and Nick Jackson) defeat The Lucha Brothers (Pentagón Jr. and Rey Fénix) to retain the AAA World Tag Team Championship, and Cody defeated his brother Dustin Rhodes. The event was also notable for the surprise appearances of Awesome Kong, Bret Hart (who unveiled the AEW World Championship belt), as well as Jon Moxley (formerly known in WWE as Dean Ambrose). Moxley and Kong were confirmed to have signed with AEW.

The event received critical acclaim, with Jericho vs. Omega, The Young Bucks vs. The Lucha Brothers, and Cody vs. Dustin Rhodes earning the most praise; most critics hailed the latter as the best match of the night. Double or Nothing later won the Wrestling Observer Newsletter Award for Best Major Wrestling Show of 2019, while Cody vs. Dustin Rhodes won the Pro Wrestling Illustrated Award for Match of the Year.

== Production ==
=== Background ===
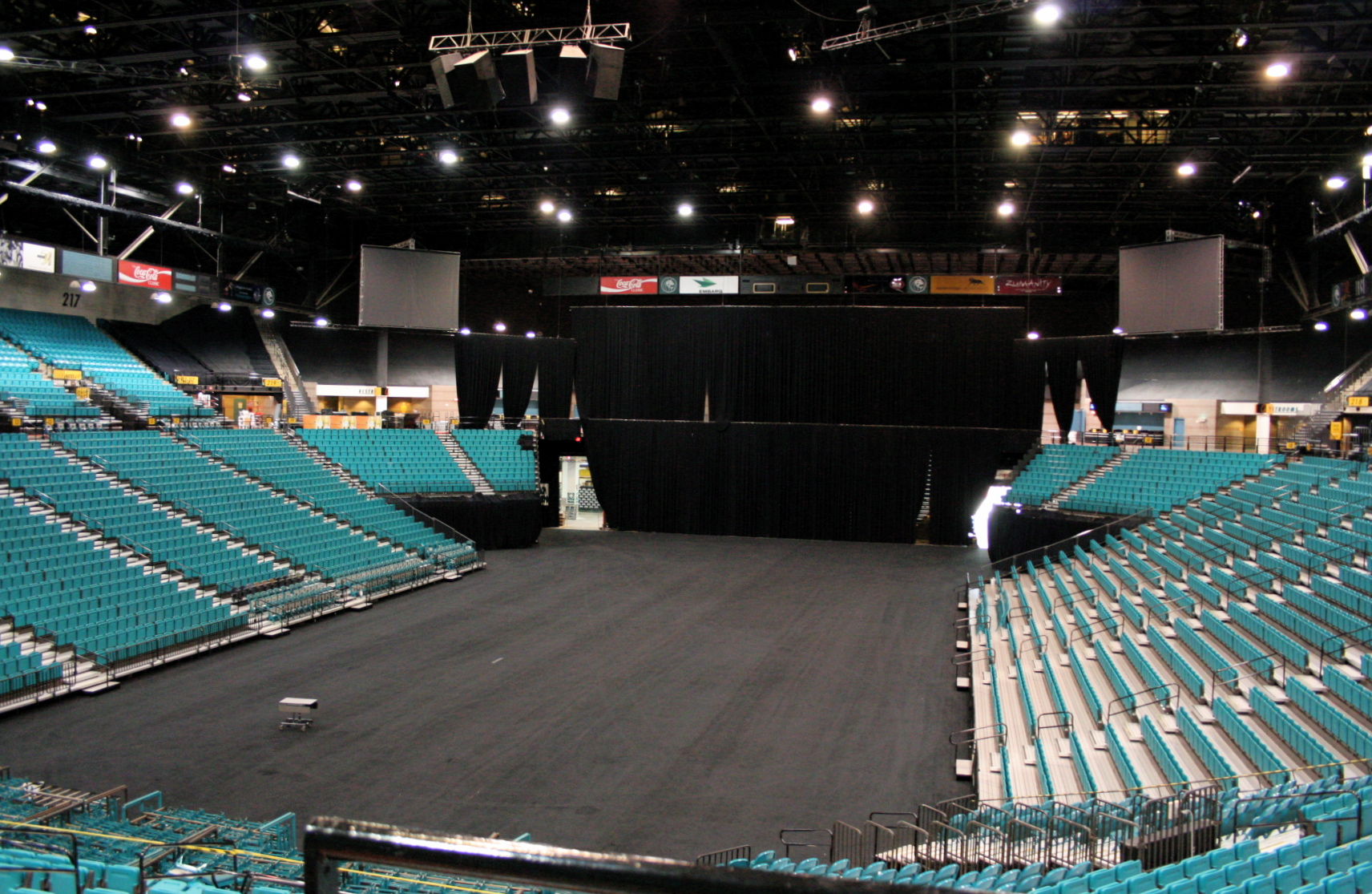
The inaugural Double or Nothing, which was also the inaugural All Elite Wrestling pay-per-view event, was held at the MGM Grand Garden Arena in the Las Vegas suburb of Paradise, Nevada.

After the success of the September 2018 event All In, an independent professional wrestling event that came as a result of a bet with wrestling journalist Dave Meltzer, a group known as The Elite (Cody, The Young Bucks, and Kenny Omega), the driving forces behind the event, used the positive response from All In to pursue further events with backing of businessmen Shahid Khan and Tony Khan. In a promo after All In, Cody said "I know when you make a bet, sometime you go double or nothing". On November 5, 2018, several trademarks were filed in Jacksonville, Florida, among them were "All Elite Wrestling" and "Double or Nothing", leading to speculation of a formation of a promotion and the name of the promotion's first event.

On January 1, 2019, All Elite Wrestling (AEW) was officially founded. Along with the announcement, the promotion's inaugural event, Double or Nothing, was scheduled to air on pay-per-view (PPV) during Memorial Day weekend on Saturday, May 25, 2019, at the MGM Grand Garden Arena in the Las Vegas suburb of Paradise, Nevada, with the event taking on a Vegas theme. On February 8, at AEW's Las Vegas rally, Chief Brandi Officer Brandi Rhodes announced the signings of Japanese women wrestlers Aja Kong and Yuka Sakazaki, who would make their first appearances for AEW at Double or Nothing. On February 10, it was announced that pre-sale tickets sold out almost immediately after going on sale. On February 13, AEW announced that all tickets for the event sold out within 4 minutes of going on sale. In April, it was announced that Jim Ross would do play-by-play commentary for the event.

On May 8, 2019, it was announced that Double or Nothing would air on ITV Box Office in the United Kingdom. Additionally, a one-hour pre-show titled "The Buy In" aired on ITV4 featuring the Casino Battle Royale and other matches. The following week, it was announced that it would also stream on WarnerMedia's B/R Live service in the United States and AEW's YouTube channel worldwide.

=== Storylines ===
The event comprised nine professional wrestling matches, including two on the Buy In pre-show, that involved different wrestlers from pre-existing scripted feuds and storylines. Storylines were produced on The Young Bucks' YouTube series Being The Elite and Cody's Nightmare Family YouTube series The Road to Double or Nothing, as well as at various independent wrestling shows.

At AEW's inaugural rally in Jacksonville, a match featuring SoCal Uncensored (Christopher Daniels, Frankie Kazarian, and Scorpio Sky) against Oriental Wrestling Entertainment's (OWE) Cima and two partners of his choosing was announced for Double or Nothing after SoCal Uncensored challenged Cima to a match. On March 3, OWE announced a tag team tournament to determine who Cima's partners would be. On May 6, it was announced that Cima would team with T-Hawk and El Lindaman.

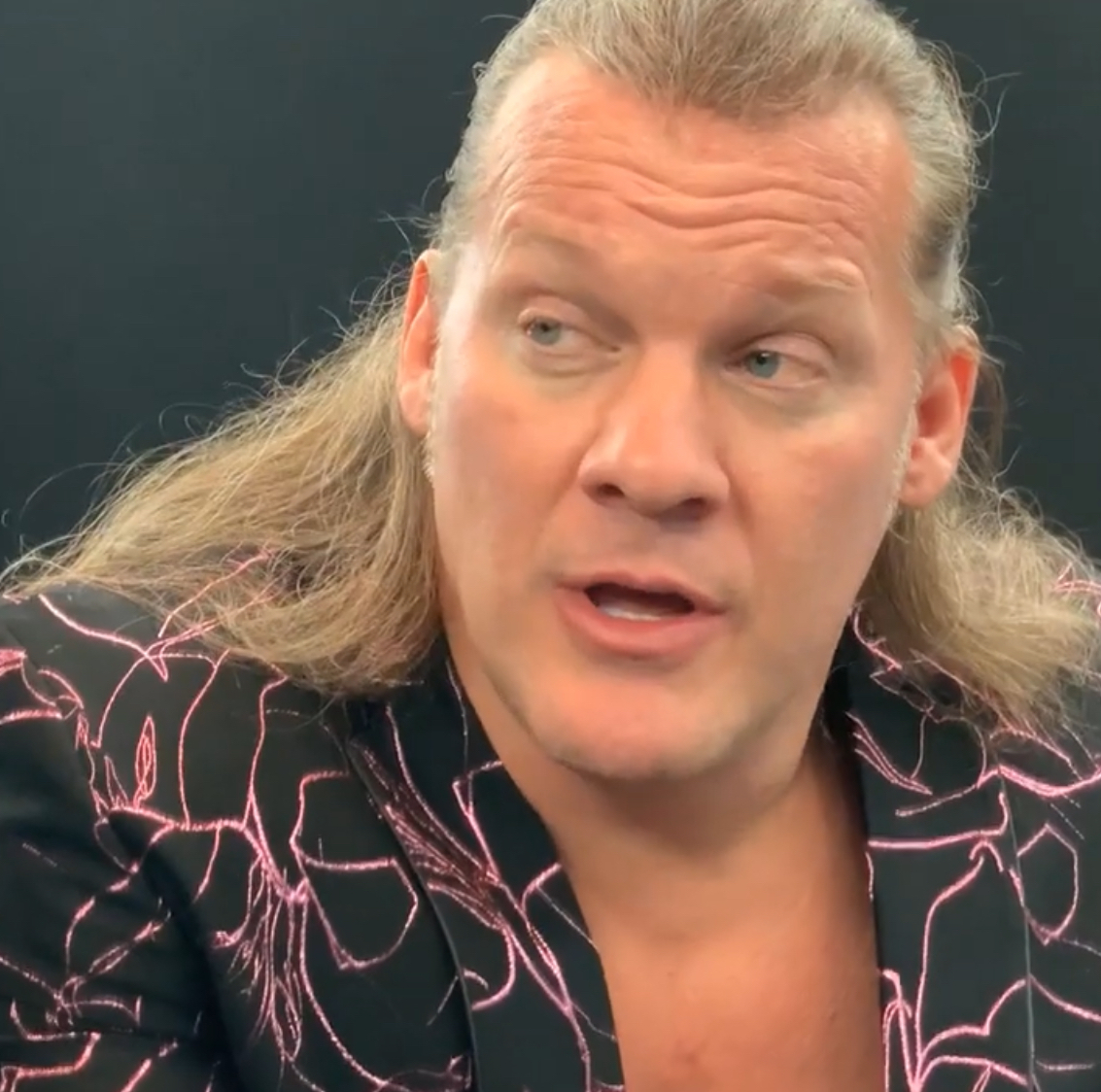
Chris Jericho, who won an opportunity for the inaugural AEW World Championship by defeating Kenny Omega in the main event

On January 4, 2018, at New Japan Pro-Wrestling's Wrestle Kingdom 12, Kenny Omega defeated Chris Jericho in their first encounter. In September at All In, after Omega defeated Penta El Zero, he was attacked by Jericho. The following month, the two were involved in a six-man tag team match at Jericho's Rock 'N' Wrestling Rager at Sea event, where Omega's team defeated Jericho's. In January 2019, Jericho signed with AEW and after Omega announced that he had signed with the promotion the following month, he was confronted by Jericho and the two brawled but were separated by Cody, Christopher Daniels, and security. A rematch from Wrestle Kingdom 12 was later announced for Double or Nothing. It was later confirmed that the winner would face the winner of the Casino Battle Royale for the inaugural AEW World Championship at a later date.

At AEW's inaugural rally in Jacksonville, Britt Baker announced that she had signed with AEW. The following month during AEW's Las Vegas rally, Brandi Rhodes announced that Kylie Rae and Nyla Rose had also signed with the promotion. Following some remarks from Rae, she was interrupted by Rose and the two had a stare down but were separated before a brawl could occur. One day later, a three-way match between Baker, Rae, and Rose was announced for the event.

During AEW's Las Vegas rally, The Lucha Brothers (Pentagón Jr. and Rey Fénix) announced they had signed with AEW. Following the announcement, the duo attacked The Young Bucks (Matt Jackson and Nick Jackson). On February 23, 2019 at AAW Wrestling's The Art of War, The Young Bucks attacked The Lucha Brothers. Two days later, a match between the two teams was announced for Double or Nothing. On March 16 at AAA's Rey de Reyes, The Young Bucks defeated The Lucha Brothers for the AAA World Tag Team Championship, subsequently turning their Double or Nothing match into a rematch for the championship.

On February 20, 2019, on The Road to Double or Nothing, Cody announced the second Over the Budget Battle Royale for the Buy In pre-show, with initial participants being Sonny Kiss, Kip Sabian, and Brandon Cutler. On May 6, the match was renamed Casino Battle Royale. The rules were that there would be 21 entrants. Five entrants would start the match and every three minutes, five more wrestlers entered with the 21st and final entrant entering alone. It was later confirmed that the winner would receive a future AEW World Championship match against the winner of the match between Kenny Omega and Chris Jericho. On May 8, it was announced that Kip Sabian would face Sammy Guevara on the Buy In pre-show.

On April 20, 2019, after weeks of teasing opponents, it was announced that Cody would face his brother Dustin Rhodes at Double or Nothing. Dustin was most famously known for his gimmick of Goldust in WWE, which granted his release in early 2019. In the following weeks, Cody declared that he would defeat his brother as a way to "kill" the Attitude Era.

==== Canceled match ====
At AEW's inaugural rally in Jacksonville, Adam Page was interrupted by Pac, setting up a feud between the two wrestlers. At AEW's second rally in Las Vegas, a match between Page and Pac was officially announced for Double or Nothing. However, in late May, it was reported that the match was "canceled" and would no longer take place due to "creative differences". As a result of the cancellation, they wrestled a match at Wrestle Gate Pro about a week before Double or Nothing. In a surprise appearance, Page answered an open challenge by Pac that ended in disqualification with Page winning. After the match, Pac attacked Page's knee and said that his goal all along was to injure Page and with that done, he had no reason to show up at Double or Nothing. This was done to write the match off the card. Later that week on an episode of Being The Elite, Page was selling the knee injury and said he could not wrestle at Double or Nothing.

== Event ==
Other on-screen personnel
Role	Name
Commentators	Jim Ross (PPV)
Commentators	Excalibur (Pre-show + PPV)
Commentators	Alex Marvez (Pre-show + PPV)
Commentators	Allie (Women's fatal four-way match)
Ring announcer	Justin Roberts
Referees	Aubrey Edwards
Referees	Bryce Remsburg
Referees	Earl Hebner
Referees	Paul Turner
Referees	Rick Knox
Interviewer	Alicia Atout

=== The Buy-In ===
Two matches occurred during the Buy In. The first was the Casino Battle Royale, in which the winner would face the winner of the main event for the inaugural AEW World Championship at All Out. Adam Page, the 21st and final entrant, won by last eliminating MJF.

In the second match, Kip Sabian faced Sammy Guevera. Sabian performed The Deathly Hallows on Guevera to win the match.

=== Preliminary matches ===
The actual pay-per-view opened with SoCal Uncensored (Christopher Daniels, Frankie Kazarian, and Scorpio Sky) facing Strong Hearts (Cima, T-Hawk, and El Lindaman). Daniels and Kazarian performed the Best Meltzer Ever on Lindaman to win the match.

Next, a Triple Threat match between Dr. Britt Baker, D.M.D, Nyla Rose and Kylie Rae was scheduled. Before the match, Brandi Rhodes announced Awesome Kong as a participant, thus the match was changed to a fatal four-way. Baker performed a Brainbuster onto her Knee on Rae to win the match.

After that, Best Friends (Chuck Taylor and Trent Beretta) faced Angélico and Jack Evans. Taylor and Beretta performed Strong Zero on Evans to win the match.

Later, Hikaru Shida, Riho, and Ryo Mizunami faced Aja Kong, Emi Sakura, and Yuka Sakazaki. Shida performed a Running Knee Strike on Sakura to win the match.

In the fifth match, Cody (accompanied by his wife, Brandi Rhodes) faced his brother, Dustin Rhodes. Brandi tackled Dustin on the floor, leading to referee Earl Hebner ejecting her, which Diamond Dallas Page removed her following Hebner's request. Dustin performed a Final Cut on Cody for a near-fall. Cody performed a Disaster Kick and Cross Rhodes on Dustin for a near-fall. Cody performed a second Cross Rhodes on Dustin to win. After the match, Cody announced he would team with Dustin against The Young Bucks (Matt and Nick Jackson) at Fight for the Fallen. Cody and Dustin embraced in the ring after the announcement.

In the penultimate match, The Young Bucks (Matt and Nick Jackson) defended the AAA World Tag Team Championship against Lucha Brothers (Pentagon Jr and Rey Fenix). Matt and Nick performed the Meltzer Driver on Fenix to retain the titles.

=== Main event ===
In the main event, Chris Jericho faced Kenny Omega where the winner would face Adam Page for the inaugural AEW World Championship at All Out. Omega performed a Baseball Slide and Rise of the Terminator on Jericho into a table. Omega performed a Springboard Double Foot Stomp on the table on Jericho. Jericho performed a Back Body Drop on Omega through the table on the floor. Omega dove off the top rope but Jericho countered into a Codebreaker for a nearfall. Omega attempted a One-Winged Angel but Jericho countered into a DDT and performed a second Codebreaker on Omega. In the end, Jericho then performed the Judas Effect on Omega to win the match. After the match, Jon Moxley (formerly Dean Ambrose in WWE) appeared and attacked both Jericho and Omega. Omega fought back and the two brawled up the entrance ramp where Moxley performed a standing fireman's carry takeover on Omega through the stage.

== Reception ==
=== Tickets and buys ===
According to Dave Meltzer, there were 11,000 tickets for Double or Nothing. Of these tickets, "almost all" were sold in a pre-sale on February 11, 2019, in around or less than 30 minutes, to people who had earlier provided their email addresses. Travel packages and VIP packages also sold out. Ticket sales were opened to the general public on February 13, 2019, and sold out in 4 minutes.

On the June 3 edition of the Wrestling Observer Newsletter, Dave Meltzer wrote that Double or Nothing received "roughly 98,000 buys between television and digital PPV, with close to a 50/50 split between the two ... About two-thirds came from the U.S., with the U.K., which aired the pre-show on ITV4, being the strong second followed by Australia, Germany and Canada." Meltzer predicted that further replay buys of Double or Nothing "should easily" result in it overtaking "ECW's biggest-ever show (99,000) and [becoming] the biggest PPV in pro wrestling history that wasn't produced by WWE or WCW." Meltzer additionally described that no one has achieved this level of buys "without regular television exposure since the 2002 Tito Ortiz vs. Ken Shamrock and 2004 Chuck Liddell vs. Ortiz [mixed martial arts] fights". On the June 10 edition, Meltzer wrote that Double or Nothing "is estimated at somewhere between 98,500 and 113,000 buys worldwide. The best estimate has U.S. PPV buys at around 71,000, with almost an exact 50/50 split between television and B/R Live. That’s notable because nobody does a 50/50 split. The biggest split I’ve heard of for a television PPV and streaming was Conor McGregor vs. Khabib Nurmagomedov, which was an 80/20 split in favor of television. Usually it's closer to 85/15".

=== Critical reception ===
John Powell of Canadian Online Explorer's Slam! Wrestling noted that Double or Nothing "proved without a doubt that AEW is THE competition [to WWE], THE alternative [to WWE], THE very change the wrestling industry and wrestling fans have been waiting for", with Kenny Omega, Cody Rhodes, Adam Page, Nick and Matt Jackson being the "faces of the wrestling revolution some fans have been waiting for since March 26, 2001, when Monday Nitro went off the air and WWE bought WCW".

A CBS Sports article jointly written by Brian Campbell, Jack Crosby, and Adam Silverstein declared that Double or Nothing "felt very much like a historic card that boldly announced new competition for the long-time industry leader WWE", as they successfully built "anticipation of the launch of their weekly fall show on TNT". They highlighted "AEW's first viral moment" created by the unannounced appearance of Jon Moxley, the "blood and tears exchanged by the Rhodes brothers", and the "theatrics and aerial exploits of Kenny Omega, The Young Bucks and The Lucha Bros".

Tim Fiorvanti of ESPN declared: "Double or Nothing was not a perfect first effort for AEW, but the show hit hard where it counted most -- storytelling, emotion and surprise." The emotion and storytelling was brought by the "vicious, bloody war waged between brothers Cody and Dustin Rhodes". Chris Jericho's win and the appearances of Jon Moxley and Awesome Kong were the surprises. Also, Fiorvanti felt "the entire card reminded people how good tag-team wrestling can be when it's at its best" and "offered a tremendous cross section of what the future of women's wrestling will look like".

Sean Radican of Pro Wrestling Torch described the event as "fantastic first outing overall for AEW". Omega-Jericho had a "very sudden, but good finish", Cody-Dustin "was a classic throwback bloodbath that had a ton of heat", while Young Bucks-Lucha Bros "was a state-of-the-art tag team classic". However, Radican noted that there "were some warts with production and commentary", and also preferred removing "the pre-show and most of the undercard matches" as the event would have been a "total home run" for him if it were shortened to two hours.

Jason Powell of Pro Wrestling Dot Net wrote that AEW "delivered big in its first pay-per-view effort". The "big three matches" that ended the event "made the show" because they "had real storyline support and were very well worked". Cody-Dustin had the "intensity, drama, and the storyline of two brothers doing battle", Young Bucks-Lucha Bros was a "spot crazy match that also had good emotion", while Jericho and Omega "definitely left it all in the ring" despite a match that "was sloppy here and there".

Mike Tedesco of WrestleView described Double or Nothing as an "amazing show" that "started slow" but ultimately reminded him "why pro wrestling can be fun and exciting when done right". The AAA World Tag title match was "off the hook fun" and "got a little spotty, but the athleticism was on another level." The main event had "great drama and action" and "everything made sense." Jon Moxley's "amazing introduction" "sets him right at the top of the ladder". However, Tedesco "cringed with some of the comments made toward WWE".

Dave Meltzer of the Wrestling Observer Newsletter wrote that Double or Nothing "will go down as one of the landmark PPVs in history, both because of the match quality but more the atmosphere created by the fans." Also, from "a creative standpoint and connecting with fans, [AEW] blew away WWE". The show indicated "the value of social media" and "the dissatisfaction with WWE". Meltzer said the Cody-Dustin match "stole the show", giving it five full stars. In a poll done by the newsletter of over 1700 respondents, 97.5% gave a "thumbs up" to the show, 1.8% were neutral, while 0.7% gave a "thumbs down". The publication later awarded it the Wrestling Observer Newsletter Award for Best Major Wrestling Show of 2019.

In November, Troy L. Smith of cleveland.com released a list of the "50 greatest wrestling pay-per-views of all time" from every professional wrestling promotion in the world, with Double or Nothing ranked at number 46, writing that the first AEW pay-per-view event "feels like something that will eventually mark a turning point in the wrestling industry." Pro Wrestling Illustrated awarded the Cody vs. Dustin Rhodes match the Pro Wrestling Illustrated Award for Match of the Year.

== Aftermath ==
A week after Double or Nothing, the inaugural AEW World Championship match between Chris Jericho and Adam Page was confirmed for AEW's event, All Out, on August 31, 2019. At All Out, Jericho defeated Page to become the first-ever AEW World Champion.

Following the confrontation between Jon Moxley and Kenny Omega, a match between the two was scheduled for All Out, but it was cancelled due to Moxley suffering an elbow injury. It was then rescheduled for Full Gear in November. At Full Gear, Moxley emerged victorious.

After settling creative differences, Pac returned to AEW and replaced Jon Moxley in a match against Kenny Omega at All Out that Pac won. During Adam Page's post-event interview following his loss to Chris Jericho for the AEW World Championship at All Out, Pac interrupted the interview and said he returned to AEW to seek revenge against Page. The two were then scheduled to face each other during the debut broadcast of AEW's television show, AEW Dynamite on October 2.

Double or Nothing has since been called AEW's marquee domestic event, and along with their next three major PPVs, All Out, Full Gear, and Revolution, the four together are considered AEW's "Big Four" PPVs, their four biggest domestic shows produced quarterly.

== Results ==
No.	Results	Stipulations	Times
1^{P}	Adam Page won by last eliminating MJF	21-man Casino Battle Royale; Winner faced the winner of Double or Nothing's main event for the inaugural AEW World Championship at All Out	16:00
2^{P}	Kip Sabian defeated Sammy Guevara	Singles match	10:00
3	SoCal Uncensored (Christopher Daniels, Frankie Kazarian, and Scorpio Sky) defeated Strong Hearts (Cima, T-Hawk, and El Lindaman)	Six-man tag team match	13:40
4	Dr. Britt Baker, D.M.D. defeated Nyla Rose, Kylie Rae, and Awesome Kong (with Brandi Rhodes)	Four-way match	11:10
5	Best Friends (Chuck Taylor and Trent Beretta) defeated Angélico and Jack Evans	Tag team match	12:35
6	Hikaru Shida, Riho, and Ryo Mizunami defeated Aja Kong, Emi Sakura, and Yuka Sakazaki	Six-woman tag team match	13:10
7	Cody (with Brandi Rhodes) defeated Dustin Rhodes	Brother vs. Brother match	22:30
8	The Young Bucks (Matt Jackson and Nick Jackson) (c) defeated The Lucha Brothers (Rey Fénix and Pentagón Jr.)	Tag team match for the AAA World Tag Team Championship	24:55
9	Chris Jericho defeated Kenny Omega	Singles match Winner faced Adam Page (Casino Battle Royale winner) for the inaugural AEW World Championship at All Out.	27:00
(c) / – the champion(s) heading into the match; P / – the match was broadcast on the pre-show

=== Casino Battle Royale entrances and eliminations ===
Five wrestlers started the match. Every three minutes, five more wrestlers entered. The 21st and final entrant entered alone.

Draw	Entrant	Order	Eliminated by	Eliminations
Clubs	Dustin Thomas	10	MJF	1
Clubs	MJF	20	Adam Page	3
Clubs	Sunny Daze	2	Glacier	1
Clubs	Brandon Cutler	12	MJF	1
Clubs	Michael Nakazawa	1	Sunny Daze	0
Diamonds	Isiah Kassidy	5	Luchasaurus	1
Diamonds	Jimmy Havoc	18	Luchasaurus	2
Diamonds	Joey Janela	13	Luchasaurus	0
Diamonds	Brian Pillman Jr.	4	Isiah Kassidy and Marq Quen	0
Diamonds	Shawn Spears	9	Dustin Thomas	0
Hearts	Billy Gunn	11	Brandon Cutler	0
Hearts	Glacier	3	MJF	1
Hearts	Jungle Boy	17	Jimmy Havoc	1
Hearts	Marq Quen	6	Luchasaurus	1
Hearts	Ace Romero	8	Jungle Boy	1
Spades	Luchasaurus	19	Adam Page	4
Spades	Marko Stunt	7	Ace Romero	0
Spades	Sonny Kiss	14	Tommy Dreamer	0
Spades	Tommy Dreamer	16	Jimmy Havoc	2
Spades	Orange Cassidy	15	Tommy Dreamer	0
Joker	Adam Page	-	Winner	2

== See also ==
- 2019 in professional wrestling
- List of All Elite Wrestling pay-per-view events
