= All Out (2022) =

All Elite Wrestling pay-per-view event

- Promotional poster featuring Jon Moxley and CM Punk
- Promotion: All Elite Wrestling
- Date: September 4, 2022
- City: Hoffman Estates, Illinois
- Venue: Now Arena
- Attendance: 10,014
- Buy rate: 140,000

Pay-per-view chronology
← Previous; Forbidden Door	Next → Full Gear

All Out chronology
← Previous; 2021	Next → 2023

The 2022 All Out was the fourth annual All Out professional wrestling pay-per-view (PPV) event produced by All Elite Wrestling (AEW). It took place during Labor Day weekend on September 4, 2022, at the Now Arena in the Chicago suburb of Hoffman Estates, Illinois.

Fifteen matches were contested at the event, including four on the Zero Hour pre-show. In the main event, CM Punk defeated Jon Moxley to win the AEW World Championship for a second time. In other prominent matches, Chris Jericho defeated Bryan Danielson, The Elite (Kenny Omega, Matt Jackson, and Nick Jackson) defeated "Hangman" Adam Page and The Dark Order (Alex Reynolds and John Silver) to win the inaugural AEW World Trios Championship, and in the opening bout, MJF made a surprise return as the disguised "joker" entrant and won the Casino Ladder match. It was the first event to feature the AEW World Trios Championship, and also featured a one-off appearance from Impact Wrestling's Motor City Machine Guns (Alex Shelley and Chris Sabin), who would go on to sign with AEW in July 2026 after their release from WWE a few months prior.

The event became infamous for an incident which occurred during the post-show media scrum, where CM Punk insulted and berated several wrestlers, leading to a legitimate backstage fight between Punk, The Elite, and backstage producer Ace Steel. Steel was released and the other four were suspended, along with four other wrestlers involved in the fight; Punk and The Elite were all stripped of their respective championships. All parties involved eventually returned to AEW within ten months after the incident, although Punk would be terminated on September 2, 2023—almost a year to the date of All Out–following a similar incident at All In with Steel released shortly after.

== Production ==
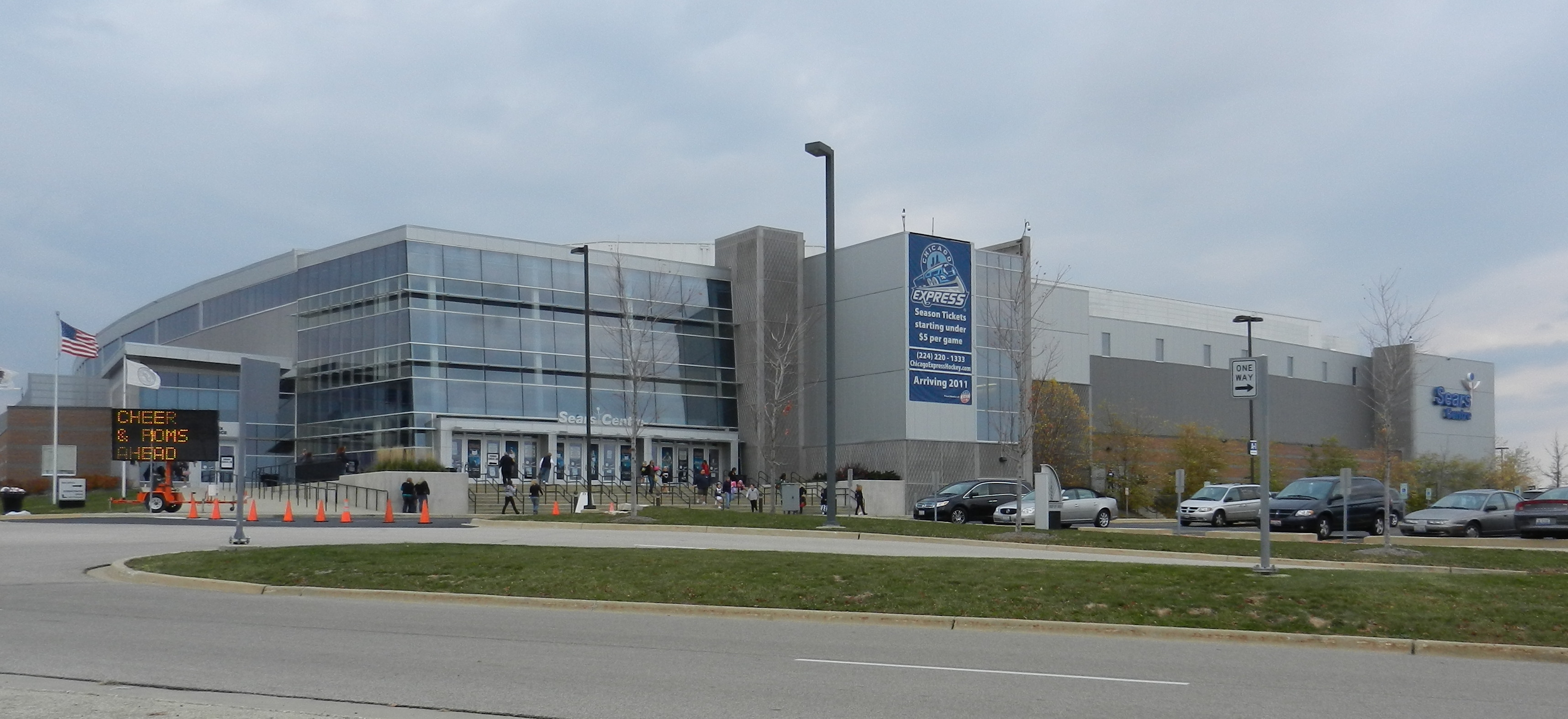
The event was held at the Now Arena in the Chicago suburb of Hoffman Estates, Illinois, marking the third All Out held here after 2019 and 2021.

Other on-screen personnel
Role	Name
Commentators	Excalibur (Pre-show and PPV)
Commentators	Jim Ross (PPV)
Commentators	Tony Schiavone (Pre-show and PPV)
Commentators	Taz (PPV)
Commentators	Don Callis (Trios title match)
Commentators	William Regal (Bryan Danielson vs Chris Jericho)
Ring announcer	Justin Roberts
Referees	Aubrey Edwards
Referees	Bryce Remsburg
Referees	Mike Chioda
Referees	Paul Turner
Referees	Rick Knox
Referees	Stephon Smith
Interviewers	Alex Marvez
Interviewers	Mark Henry

=== Background ===
All Out is a professional wrestling pay-per-view (PPV) event held annually during Labor Day weekend by All Elite Wrestling (AEW) since 2019. It is one of AEW's "Big Four" PPVs, which also includes Double or Nothing, Full Gear, and Revolution, their four biggest domestic shows produced quarterly. On July 13, 2022, AEW announced that the fourth All Out event would take place on September 4 at the Now Arena in the Chicago suburb of Hoffman Estates, Illinois. Additionally as part of All Out week, both of AEW's weekly television programs, Wednesday Night Dynamite and Friday Night Rampage, aired live from the same arena on August 31 and September 2, respectively. Tickets for all three events went on sale on July 15 with bundle packages available. There was also a fanfest on Saturday, September 3 at the Renaissance Schaumburg Convention Center. All Out itself was preceded by a one-hour pre-show called Zero Hour, which aired for free on AEW's social media platforms.

=== Storylines ===
All Out featured professional wrestling matches that involved different wrestlers from pre-existing feuds and storylines. Storylines were produced on AEW's weekly television programs, Dynamite and Rampage, the supplementary online streaming shows, Dark and Elevation, and The Young Bucks' YouTube series Being The Elite.

On the June 3, 2022, episode of Rampage, AEW World Champion CM Punk, who had won the title just days prior at Double or Nothing, announced that he was injured and required surgery. He initially wanted to relinquish the title; however, AEW president Tony Khan decided that an interim champion would be crowned until Punk's return, after which, Punk would face the interim champion to determine the undisputed champion. Jon Moxley was crowned as interim champion at AEW x NJPW: Forbidden Door on June 26. At the Quake by the Lake special episode of Dynamite on August 10, Punk made his return and confronted Moxley, entering into a title dispute. A match to determine the undisputed AEW World Champion was then scheduled at All Out. However, due to heated confrontations between the two, it was announced that the match would instead take place on the August 24 episode of Dynamite, where Moxley quickly defeated Punk due to the latter reaggravating an injury, becoming the undisputed AEW World Champion in the process. The following week on Dynamite, Moxley issued an open contract for a championship match at All Out, in which Punk signed the contract. The championship rematch was then subsequently scheduled for All Out.

== Post-event media scrum ==
In the post-event media scrum, CM Punk took issues with certain members of the wrestling media as he addressed backstage issues with colleagues in AEW. Punk first described Scott Colton (Colt Cabana) as someone who "didn't want to see me at the top", discussed their lawsuits against each other, and said he "hasn't been friends with this guy since at least 2014, late 2013". Later on, Punk stated Colton "shares a bank account with his mother, which tells you all you need to know about what kind of character that is". Punk denied rumors that he had attempted to get Colton fired, which AEW president Tony Khan corroborated. Punk also criticized "irresponsible people who call themselves EVPs" (AEW's executive vice presidents are Kenny Omega, Matt Jackson, and Nick Jackson), saying that they "couldn't fucking manage a Target" and accused them of having "spread lies and bullshit and put into the media that I got [Colt Cabana] fired when I have fuck all to do with him, want nothing to do with him. Do not care where he works, where he doesn't work. Where he eats, where he sleeps." Punk later indicated that he was trying to "sell tickets, fill arenas", while the EVPs were acting as "stupid guys [who] think they're in Reseda" (a reference to Pro Wrestling Guerrilla, an independent promotion where Omega and The Young Bucks wrestled for a number of years).

Next, Punk called "Hangman" Adam Page "an empty-headed fucking dumb fuck" who went "into business for himself" on national television, and further alluded to Page as "somebody that hasn't done a damn thing in this business [that has] jeopardized the first million dollar house that this company has drawn off of my back". Punk later said regarding Page: "Our locker room, for all the wisdom and brilliance it has, isn't worth shit when you have an empty-headed idiot, who has never done anything in the business do public interviews and say, 'I don't really take advice.'" Punk went on to describe MJF as a "supremely talented individual" but also added that "the grass is not greener on the other side, the grass is greener where you water it, and [MJF] likes to shit where he eats instead of watering the grass." Punk then proclaimed to an interviewer, "I'm hurt, I'm old, I'm fuckin' tired, and I work with fucking children."

Multiple wrestling publications, including Fightful, PWInsider, and the Wrestling Observer Newsletter, later reported that Punk's comments were followed by a fight between Punk, Kenny Omega, The Young Bucks, and Ace Steel—an AEW coach who is Punk's trainer and long-time friend. The Young Bucks and Omega were reportedly injured in the fight.

== Aftermath ==
As a result of the physical altercation following the All Out post-event media scrum, AEW president Tony Khan suspended all involved, which included CM Punk, Ace Steel, Kenny Omega, Matt Jackson, Nick Jackson, Pat Buck, Christopher Daniels, Michael Nakazawa, and Brandon Cutler. On September 7, Khan opened that night's episode of Dynamite with a pre-taped video, announcing that the World and Trios Championships were vacated, effective immediately, although did not acknowledge the incident or give an explanation. Death Triangle (Pac, Penta, and Rey Fénix) became the new Trios Champions by defeating Best Friends (Chuck Taylor, Trent Beretta, and Orange Cassidy) in a previously scheduled match that Khan converted into a title match. The show also featured the start of a tournament to crown a new World Champion, with the final taking place on September 21 at Dynamite: Grand Slam. At Grand Slam, Jon Moxley defeated Bryan Danielson in the tournament final to win the AEW World Championship for a record third time.

The suspensions of Buck, Daniels, Nakazawa, and Cutler were lifted about two weeks after All Out; according to Dave Meltzer, an independent investigation commissioned by AEW apparently determined that those individuals were trying to break up the fight.

On October 18, Ace Steel was released from AEW. Steel was rehired in early 2023 to work in a remote capacity and to produce CM Punk's segments upon Punk's return to AEW.

On November 19, in addition to resuming their positions as Executive Vice Presidents, The Elite (Omega and The Young Bucks) returned at AEW's next PPV, Full Gear, where they faced Death Triangle for the Trios Championship in a losing effort. This was later announced to be the first in a Best of Seven Series for the titles. The Best of Seven Series would go all the way to the seventh and final match on the January 11, 2023, episode of Dynamite where The Elite defeated Death Triangle in a ladder match to become two-time AEW World Trios Champions.

CM Punk suffered a torn triceps injury at the event that put him on hiatus for nine months. During the hiatus, there had been reports that Punk and AEW were in talks regarding a buyout of his contract. In April 2023, there were reports that Punk and AEW were planning Punk's return to the promotion on June 17 for the debut episode of AEW Collision taking place in Chicago, which were then confirmed by Tony Khan on the May 31 episode of Dynamite. Punk appeared on the June 14 episode of Dynamite in a vignette promoting his return for the premiere of Collision. On June 17, Punk returned to AEW on the debut episode of Collision, with all parties involved in the post-event media scrum altercation having returned to AEW. However, following another backstage altercation that occurred just a couple of months later at All In on August 27, this time between Punk and Jack Perry, Punk was terminated from his AEW contract on September 2, almost exactly a year after the All Out incident. A few days later, Ace Steel was also released from AEW.

== Results ==
No.	Results	Stipulations	Times
1^{P}	The Jericho Appreciation Society (Sammy Guevara and Tay Melo) (c) defeated Ortiz and Ruby Soho by pinfall	Mixed tag team match for the AAA World Mixed Tag Team Championship	6:00
2^{P}	Hook (c) defeated Angelo Parker (with Matt Menard) by submission	Singles match for the FTW Championship	3:55
3^{P}	Pac (c) defeated Kip Sabian by pinfall	Singles match for the AEW All-Atlantic Championship	10:00
4^{P}	Eddie Kingston defeated Tomohiro Ishii by pinfall	Singles match	13:25
5	MJF (Note: MJF wasn't revealed as The Joker until the end of the main event.) (with Stokely Hathaway, Ethan Page, Lee Moriarty, Colten Gunn, Austin Gunn, and W. Morrissey) defeated Claudio Castagnoli, Wheeler Yuta, Penta El Zero Miedo, Rey Fénix (with Alex Abrahantes), Rush, Andrade El Idolo (with José the Assistant), and Dante Martin	Casino Ladder match Winner received a future AEW World Championship match.	14:15
6	The Elite (Kenny Omega, Matt Jackson, and Nick Jackson) (with Brandon Cutler and Michael Nakazawa) defeated "Hangman" Adam Page and The Dark Order (Alex Reynolds and John Silver) by pinfall	Tournament final for the inaugural AEW World Trios Championship	19:50
7	Jade Cargill (c) (with Kiera Hogan and Leila Grey) defeated Athena by pinfall	Singles match for the AEW TBS Championship	4:20
8	Wardlow and FTR (Cash Wheeler and Dax Harwood) defeated Jay Lethal and The Motor City Machine Guns (Chris Sabin and Alex Shelley) (with Satnam Singh and Sonjay Dutt) by pinfall	Six-man tag team match	16:30
9	Powerhouse Hobbs defeated Ricky Starks by pinfall	Singles match	5:05
10	Swerve In Our Glory (Keith Lee and Swerve Strickland) (c) defeated The Acclaimed (Anthony Bowens and Max Caster) (with Billy Gunn) by pinfall	Tag team match for the AEW World Tag Team Championship	22:30
11	Toni Storm defeated Dr. Britt Baker, D.M.D. (with Rebel), Jamie Hayter, and Hikaru Shida by pinfall	Four-way match for the interim (Note: Storm's reign was later declared official after Thunder Rosa relinquished her lineal championship on the November 23, 2022, episode of Dynamite.) AEW Women's World Championship	14:20
12	Christian Cage (with Luchasaurus) defeated "Jungle Boy" Jack Perry by pinfall	Singles match	0:20
13	Chris Jericho defeated Bryan Danielson by pinfall	Singles match	23:40
14	Darby Allin, Sting, and Miro defeated The House of Black (Malakai Black, Brody King, and Buddy Matthews) (with Julia Hart) by pinfall	Six-man tag team match	12:10
15	CM Punk defeated Jon Moxley (c) by pinfall	Singles match for the AEW World Championship	19:55
(c) / – the champion(s) heading into the match; P / – the match was broadcast on the pre-show

=== AEW World Trios Championship Tournament ===
Quarterfinals; Dynamite (August 17 and 24, 2022); Rampage (August 19 and 26, 2022)
Death Triangle (Pac, Penta El Zero M, and Rey Fénix)	24:51
United Empire (Will Ospreay, Kyle Fletcher, and Mark Davis)	Pin
La Facción Ingobernable (Andrade El Idolo, Dragon Lee, and Rush)	20:50
The Elite (Kenny Omega, Matt Jackson, and Nick Jackson)	Pin
The House of Black (Malakai Black, Brody King, and Buddy Matthews)	9:03
The Dark Order (Alex Reynolds, John Silver, and Preston Vance)	Pin
The Trustbusters (Ari Daivari, Parker Boudreaux, and Slim J)	10:32
Best Friends (Chuck Taylor, Trent Beretta, and Orange Cassidy)	Pin

Semifinals; Dynamite (August 31, 2022); Rampage (September 2, 2022)
United Empire	18:59
The Elite	Pin
"Hangman" Adam Page and The Dark Order (Alex Reynolds and John Silver) (Note: Page replaced Preston Vance because the latter was not medically cleared to compete.)	Pin
Best Friends	11:10

Finals; All Out (September 4, 2022)
The Elite	Pin
"Hangman" Adam Page and The Dark Order (Alex Reynolds and John Silver)	19:50

== See also ==
- 2022 in professional wrestling
- List of All Elite Wrestling pay-per-view events
