= Full Gear (2022) =

All Elite Wrestling pay-per-view event

- Promotional poster featuring Jon Moxley and MJF
- Promotion: All Elite Wrestling
- Date: November 19, 2022
- City: Newark, New Jersey
- Venue: Prudential Center
- Attendance: 12,106
- Buy rate: 140,000

Pay-per-view chronology
← Previous; All Out	Next → Revolution

Full Gear chronology
← Previous; 2021	Next → 2023

The 2022 Full Gear was the fourth annual Full Gear professional wrestling pay-per-view (PPV) event produced by All Elite Wrestling (AEW). It took place on November 19, 2022, at the Prudential Center in Newark, New Jersey, marking AEW's first PPV to be held in the Tri-State area. The event also saw Saraya's return to wrestling and first match since December 2017, as well as the return of The Elite (Kenny Omega, Matt Jackson, and Nick Jackson) following their suspension as a result of an altercation that occurred during the All Out post-event media scrum.

The card featured thirteen matches, including three on the Zero Hour pre-show. In the main event, MJF defeated Jon Moxley to win the AEW World Championship. In other prominent matches, Saraya defeated Dr. Britt Baker, D.M.D. with the Nightcap, The Acclaimed (Max Caster and Anthony Bowens) defeated Swerve In Our Glory (Swerve Strickland and Keith Lee) to retain the AEW World Tag Team Championship, Death Triangle (Pac, Penta El Zero Miedo, and Rey Fénix) defeated The Elite to retain the AEW World Trios Championship which was later revealed to be the first match in a Best of Seven Series for the title, and in the opening bout, "Jungle Boy" Jack Perry defeated Luchasaurus by submission in a Steel Cage match.

== Production ==
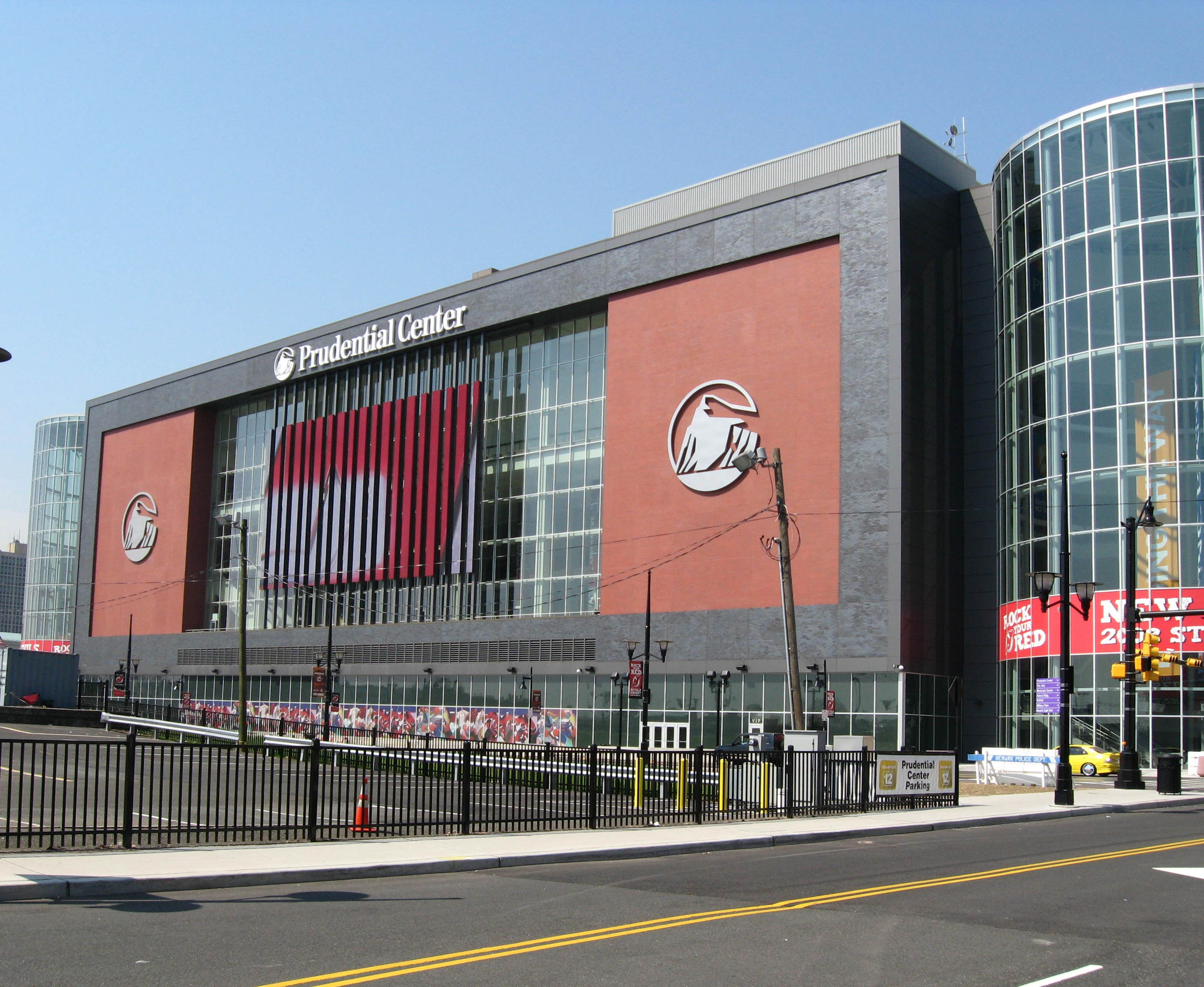
The event was held at the Prudential Center in Newark, New Jersey, marking All Elite Wrestling's first pay-per-view event held in the Tri-State area.

Other on-screen personnel
Role	Name
Commentators	Excalibur (Pre-show and PPV)
Commentators	Jim Ross (PPV)
Commentators	Tony Schiavone (Pre-show and PPV)
Commentators	Taz (Pre-show and PPV)
Commentators	Don Callis (Trios title match)
Commentators	Ian Riccaboni (ROH World Title match)
Ring announcer	Justin Roberts (PPV)
Ring announcer	Bobby Cruise (ROH World Title match)
Referees	Aubrey Edwards
Referees	Bryce Remsburg
Referees	Paul Turner
Referees	Rick Knox
Referees	Stephon Smith
Interviewer	Renee Paquette

=== Background ===
Full Gear is a professional wrestling pay-per-view (PPV) event held annually in November by All Elite Wrestling (AEW) since 2019, generally around the week of Veterans Day. It is one of AEW's "Big Four" PPVs, which includes Double or Nothing, All Out, and Revolution, their four biggest domestic events produced quarterly. Out of the four, Full Gear is AEW's only pay-per-view to be traditionally held on a Saturday. During All Out on September 4, 2022, it was announced that the fourth Full Gear event would take place on November 19, 2022, at the Prudential Center in Newark, New Jersey, marking AEW's first PPV held in the Tri-State area. It was also announced that the November 18 episode of Friday Night Rampage would air live from the same venue. Tickets for both events went on sale on September 23.

=== Storylines ===
Full Gear featured professional wrestling matches that involved different wrestlers from pre-existing feuds and storylines. Storylines were produced on AEW's weekly television programs, Dynamite and Rampage, and the supplementary online streaming shows, Dark and Elevation.

After a four-month hiatus, MJF made his return at All Out as the surprise "joker" entrant in the Casino Ladder match and won the poker chip, thus earning a match for the AEW World Championship at a time and place of his choosing. After Jon Moxley retained the title on the October 18 episode of Dynamite, Moxley called out MJF and goaded him to cash in the poker chip that night, however, MJF announced that he would cash in and challenge Moxley for the AEW World Championship at Full Gear.

At All Out, Swerve In Our Glory (Keith Lee and Swerve Strickland) defeated The Acclaimed (Anthony Bowens and Max Caster) to retain the AEW World Tag Team Championship. In a championship rematch at Grand Slam, The Acclaimed defeated Swerve In Our Glory to win the titles. On the October 26 episode of Dynamite, Swerve In Our Glory defeated FTR (Dax Harwood and Cash Wheeler) to become the #1 contenders for the championship, and on that same week's episode of Rampage, the third championship match between The Acclaimed and Swerve In Our Glory was scheduled for Full Gear.

On the October 28 episode of Rampage, AEW announced the return of the AEW World Championship Eliminator Tournament; an eight-man single-elimination tournament culminating at Full Gear with the winner receiving an AEW World Championship match at Winter Is Coming. That same episode, Dante Martin and Ethan Page named themselves as the first two participants in the tournament. The following week, Eddie Kingston, Bandido, Rush, Lance Archer, Ricky Starks, and Brian Cage were revealed as the remaining participants in the tournament. On November 17, during a media interview before Full Gear, Tony Khan confirmed that the final of the tournament would take place on the November 23 episode of Dynamite, with the semifinal match between Brian Cage and the winner of the Lance Archer vs. Ricky Starks match scheduled for the Full Gear: Zero Hour pre-show.

During Dynamite: Grand Slam on September 21, Saraya, formerly known as Paige in WWE, made her debut for AEW, confronting Dr. Britt Baker, D.M.D. and her teammates. On the October 5 episode of Dynamite, Saraya had another confrontation with Baker, which led to a physical fight, marking the first time Saraya had gotten physical in wrestling since being forced to retire in 2017 due to a serious neck injury. On the November 9 episode, Saraya announced that she was 100% cleared to return to the ring and would wrestle her first match in five years at Full Gear against Baker.

At All Out, The Elite (Kenny Omega, Matt Jackson, and Nick Jackson) won the inaugural AEW World Trios Championship. Three days later on Dynamite, however, they were suspended and stripped of the title due to their involvement in the backstage altercation that occurred during All Out's post-event media scrum. That same episode, Death Triangle (Pac, Penta El Zero M, and Rey Fénix) won the vacant Trios Championship. In late October, vignettes began airing titled "Delete The Elite", alluding to The Elite's return at Full Gear. On the November 16 episode, Death Triangle addressed the vignettes, after which, a graphic appeared on screen to confirm that The Elite would be facing Death Triangle for the AEW World Trios Championship at Full Gear.

== Aftermath ==
On the following episode of Dynamite, it was announced that lineal AEW Women's World Champion Thunder Rosa had relinquished the championship, thus Jamie Hayter became recognized as the undisputed lineal champion. Toni Storm's interim reign was also retroactively made an official reign.

William Regal appeared on the following episode of Dynamite to address his actions, but was interrupted by Jon Moxley, who came out to confront him but was stopped by Bryan Danielson. Moxley then told Regal to leave and never come back. New AEW World Champion MJF made his first post-Full Gear appearance on the following week's episode alongside Regal, where they unveiled MJF's custom version of the championship belt, which he dubbed the "Big Burberry Belt", or Triple-B for short, featuring the exact same design as the standard belt, but with a brown leather strap fashioned in Burberry's trademark check pattern to match MJF's signature Burberry scarf. He also explained that he and Regal began an alliance following an email Regal had sent him after The Firm had attacked MJF a few weeks prior. However, MJF then turned on Regal and was run off by Danielson. The next week, a pre-recorded video of Regal was played, which addressed the future of the Blackpool Combat Club. Regal said they did not need him anymore and he needed to show them that, which is why he turned on Moxley. He also said that he knew Moxley, Danielson, and Claudio Castagnoli would be able to teach Wheeler Yuta to become one of the best wrestlers. This would be Regal's last appearance in AEW, as he chose to not renew his contract that was expiring at the end of the year so that he could return to WWE and help train his son Charlie Dempsey in NXT.

After Death Triangle (Pac, Penta El Zero M, and Rey Fénix) retained the AEW World Trios Championship over The Elite (Kenny Omega, Matt Jackson, and Nick Jackson), it was announced that their Full Gear match was the first in a Best of Seven Series for the title. The series occurred over the next couple of months, going all the way to the seventh and final match on the January 11, 2023, episode of Dynamite. In the final, The Elite defeated Death Triangle in a ladder match to become two-time AEW World Trios Champions.

== Results ==
No.	Results	Stipulations	Times
1^{P}	Best Friends (Chuck Taylor and Trent Beretta), Orange Cassidy, Rocky Romero, and Danhausen defeated The Factory (QT Marshall, Aaron Solo, Lee Johnson, Nick Comoroto, and Cole Karter) by pinfall	10-man tag team match	11:55
2^{P}	Ricky Starks defeated Brian Cage (with Prince Nana) by pinfall	AEW World Championship Eliminator Tournament Semifinals	10:00
3^{P}	Eddie Kingston (with Ortiz) defeated Jun Akiyama by pinfall	Singles match	10:30
4	"Jungle Boy" Jack Perry defeated Luchasaurus (with Christian Cage) by submission	Steel Cage match	18:40
5	Death Triangle (Pac, Penta El Zero Miedo, and Rey Fénix) (c) defeated The Elite (Kenny Omega, Matt Jackson, and Nick Jackson) (with Brandon Cutler and Michael Nakazawa) by pinfall	Six-man tag team match for the AEW World Trios Championship; Match one in a Best of Seven Series for the championship.	18:40
6	Jade Cargill (c) (with The Baddies (Kiera Hogan and Leila Grey)) defeated Nyla Rose (with Marina Shafir and Vickie Guerrero) by pinfall	Singles match for the AEW TBS Championship	8:00
7	Chris Jericho (c) defeated Bryan Danielson, Claudio Castagnoli, and Sammy Guevara by pinfall	Four-way match for the ROH World Championship	21:30
8	Saraya defeated Dr. Britt Baker, D.M.D. by pinfall	Singles match	12:30
9	Samoa Joe defeated Wardlow (c) and Powerhouse Hobbs by technical submission	Three-way match for the AEW TNT Championship	9:55
10	Sting and Darby Allin defeated Jeff Jarrett and Jay Lethal (with Sonjay Dutt and Satnam Singh) by pinfall	No Disqualification Tag team match	11:00
11	Jamie Hayter defeated Toni Storm (c) by pinfall	Singles match for the interim (Note: On the November 23, 2022, episode of Dynamite, it was announced that due to the severity of lineal champion Thunder Rosa's injury, Hayter was promoted to the undisputed champion. Toni Storm's reign was also retroactively recognized as an undisputed reign.) AEW Women's World Championship	15:00
12	The Acclaimed (Max Caster and Anthony Bowens) (c) defeated Swerve In Our Glory (Swerve Strickland and Keith Lee) by pinfall	Tag team match for the AEW World Tag Team Championship	19:40
13	MJF defeated Jon Moxley (c) (with William Regal) by pinfall	Singles match for the AEW World Championship; This was MJF's Casino Poker Chip cash-in match.	23:15
(c) / – the champion(s) heading into the match; P / – the match was broadcast on the pre-show
