= AEW Revolution =

All Elite Wrestling pay-per-view event series

- AEW Revolution logo since 2025
- Promotions: All Elite Wrestling
- First event: 2020

AEW Revolution is a professional wrestling pay-per-view (PPV) event produced by All Elite Wrestling (AEW). Established in 2020, it was originally held in late February but has since been held annually in March since 2021. It is one of AEW's "Big Five" events, along with All In, All Out, Double or Nothing, and Full Gear.

== History ==
The inaugural Revolution event took place on February 29, 2020, at the Wintrust Arena in Chicago, Illinois, and was held in partnership between the American professional wrestling promotion All Elite Wrestling (AEW) and the Chicago Comic & Entertainment Expo (C2E2). This inaugural event would be AEW's last pay-per-view (PPV) held before the start of the COVID-19 pandemic, which moved the majority of AEW's shows to Daily's Place in Jacksonville, Florida.

A second Revolution was held on March 7, 2021, moving Revolution to the early March slot. This second event was originally scheduled for February 27, but due to the Canelo Alvarez vs. Avni Yildirim bout in Miami Gardens, Florida airing that same night, AEW rescheduled Revolution for Sunday, March 7, which in turn made it AEW's first PPV to be held on a Sunday; the promotion had considered Saturday, March 6, but UFC 259 was airing that night.

AEW resumed live touring with fans in July 2021. In turn, the 2022 Revolution was held on March 6 of that year at the Addition Financial Arena in Orlando, Florida. It was the culmination of a three-day event, with an episode of Rampage and a fanfest taking place on March 4 and 5, respectively, at the same venue.

Revolution's 2023 event took place in San Francisco's Chase Center on March 5, featuring an Iron Man match between MJF and Bryan Danielson as its main event.

Wrestling veteran Sting had his AEW debut match at the 2021 Revolution. On the October 18, 2023, episode of Dynamite, he announced that his retirement match would be at the 2024 Revolution. It was a tornado tag team match in which Sting and Darby Allin defended the AEW World Tag Team Championship against The Young Bucks (Matthew Jackson and Nicholas Jackson). Sting and Allin retained, thus Sting retired as both an undefeated tag team with Allin and as champion.

On November 19, 2024, it was announced that the 2025 Revolution event would take place on March 9, 2025, at the Crypto.com Arena in Los Angeles, California. This was AEW's first PPV to stream on Amazon Prime Video.

== Reception ==
For the 2020 Wrestling Observer Newsletter awards, the inaugural Revolution event was voted as the Best Major Wrestling Show of the year. The following year's event became the highest grossing non-WWE wrestling PPV since 1999. It was also AEW's largest attended event during the COVID-19 pandemic up to that point, with an estimated 1,300 spectators.

All the Revolution PPVs have received positive reviews, with the 2020, 2023, and 2024 PPVs receiving particular critical acclaim. The 2020, 2023 and 2024 events were voted as the Best Major Wrestling Show of their respective years for the Wrestling Observer Newsletter awards, while the 2021 event was the highest-grossing non-WWE wrestling PPV since 1999. The 2021 event was also AEW's largest attended event during the COVID-19 pandemic up to that point.

== Events ==
#	Event	Date	City	Venue	Main event	Ref.
1	Revolution (2020)	February 29, 2020	Chicago, Illinois	Wintrust Arena	Chris Jericho (c) vs. Jon Moxley for the AEW World Championship	
2	Revolution (2021)	March 7, 2021	Jacksonville, Florida	Daily's Place	Kenny Omega (c) vs. Jon Moxley in an Exploding Barbed Wire Deathmatch for the AEW World Championship	
3	Revolution (2022)	March 6, 2022	Orlando, Florida	Addition Financial Arena	"Hangman" Adam Page (c) vs. Adam Cole for the AEW World Championship	
4	Revolution (2023)	March 5, 2023	San Francisco, California	Chase Center	MJF (c) vs. Bryan Danielson in a 60-minute Iron man match for the AEW World Championship	
5	Revolution (2024)	March 3, 2024	Greensboro, North Carolina	Greensboro Coliseum	Sting and Darby Allin (c) vs. The Young Bucks (Matthew Jackson and Nicholas Jackson) in a Tornado tag team match for the AEW World Tag Team Championship; This was also Sting's retirement match.	
6	Revolution (2025)	March 9, 2025	Los Angeles, California	Crypto.com Arena	Jon Moxley (c) vs. Cope vs. Christian Cage for the AEW World Championship; This was also Cage's Casino Gauntlet guaranteed championship match.	
7	Revolution (2026)	March 15, 2026	Los Angeles, California	Crypto.com Arena	MJF (c) vs. "Hangman" Adam Page in a Last Chance Texas Deathmatch for the AEW World Championship	
(c) – refers to the champion(s) heading into the match

== See also ==
- List of All Elite Wrestling pay-per-view events
