= AEW World Championship =

Men's professional wrestling championship

- The standard AEW World Championship belt with default name plate and default side plates (2024–present)

Details
- Promotion: All Elite Wrestling
- Date established: May 25, 2019
- Current champion: Will Ospreay
- Date won: August 30, 2026
Statistics
- First champion: Chris Jericho
- Most reigns: Jon Moxley (4 reigns)
- Longest reign: MJF (1st reign, 406 days)
- Shortest reign: CM Punk (2nd reign, 3 days)
- Oldest champion: Chris Jericho (48 years, 295 days)
- Youngest champion: MJF (26 years, 249 days)
- Heaviest champion: Samoa Joe (310 lb (140 kg))
- Lightest champion: Darby Allin (175 lb (79 kg))

The AEW World Championship is a men's professional wrestling world championship created and promoted by the American promotion All Elite Wrestling (AEW). Unveiled on May 25, 2019, it is the promotion's primary and most prestigious championship, and Chris Jericho was the inaugural champion. The current champion is Will Ospreay, who is in his first reign.

== History ==
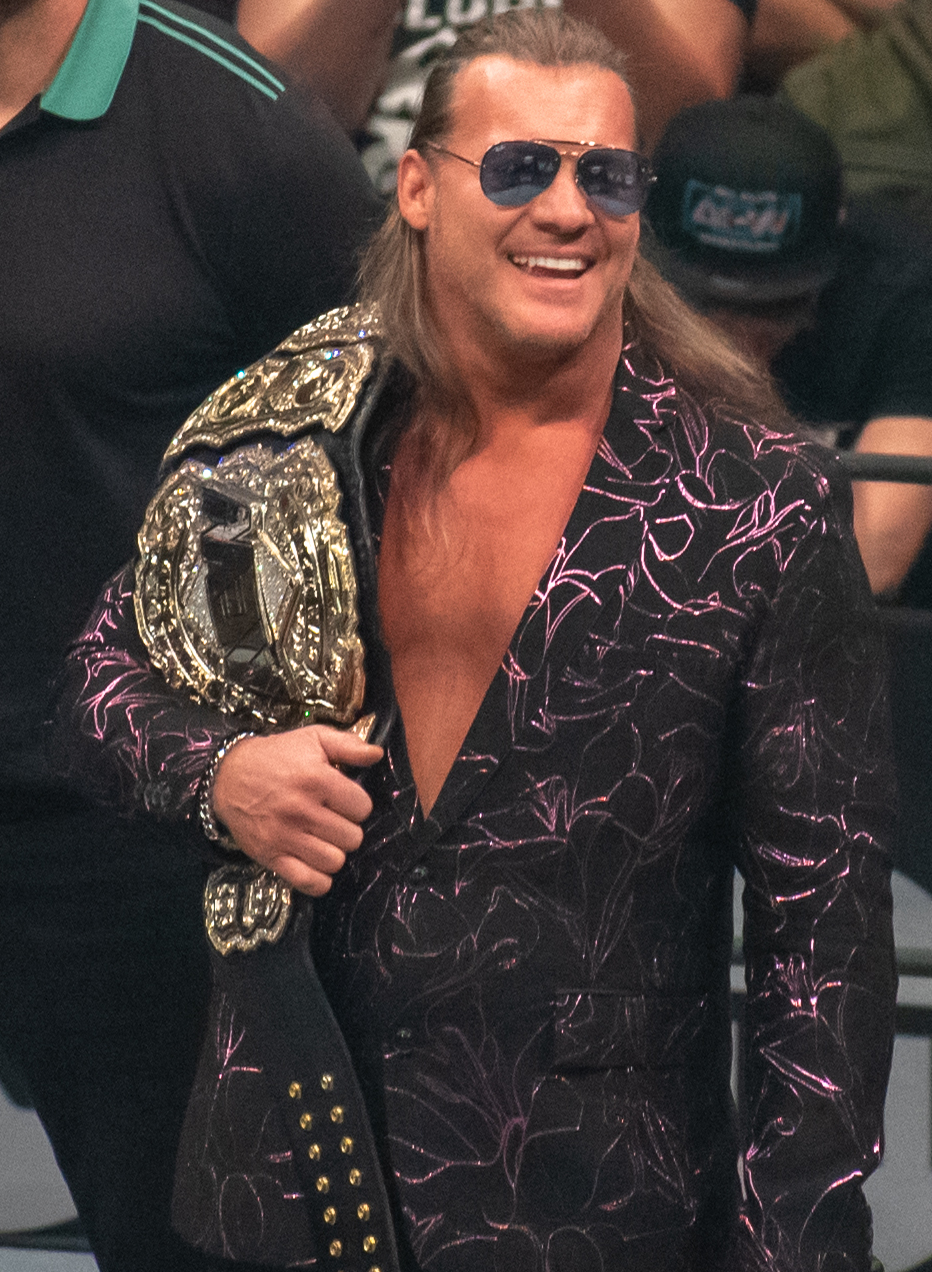
Inaugural champion Chris Jericho

On January 1, 2019, the American professional wrestling promotion All Elite Wrestling (AEW) was founded and its inaugural event and pay-per-view (PPV), Double or Nothing, was scheduled for May 25. The unveiling of the promotion's men's world championship was first teased on AEW's YouTube channel on May 22, where actor and comedian Jack Whitehall humorously attempted to reveal the title belt but struggled to get the championship out of its bag. He subsequently revealed that the winner of Double or Nothing's Buy In pre-show battle royal, called the Casino Battle Royale, would face the winner of the PPV's main event at a future date to determine the inaugural AEW World Champion. AEW president Tony Khan confirmed that since the promotion would not have weight divisions, the AEW World Championship was not a "heavyweight championship". However, on occasion, the promotion, as well as AEW wrestlers and commentators, have referred to it as the "world heavyweight championship".

At Double or Nothing, the pre-show Casino Battle Royale was won by "Hangman" Adam Page, while Chris Jericho defeated Kenny Omega in the PPV's main event, setting up the inaugural championship match. During the event, pro-wrestling veteran Bret Hart unveiled the AEW World Championship belt. Shortly after Double or Nothing, the inaugural championship match was scheduled for AEW's next major PPV, All Out, on August 31. At All Out, Jericho defeated Page in the main event to become the inaugural AEW World Champion. The following day, it was reported by Tallahassee Police that the physical championship belt was stolen from Jericho's limousine while he was traveling; it was recovered on September 4.

During Kenny Omega's reign in April 2021, the title was defended for the first time outside of AEW in then-partner promotion Impact Wrestling (renamed Total Nonstop Action Wrestling, or TNA, in January 2024). At Impact's event Rebellion on April 25, 2021, Omega defeated Impact World Champion Rich Swann in a Winner Takes All match.

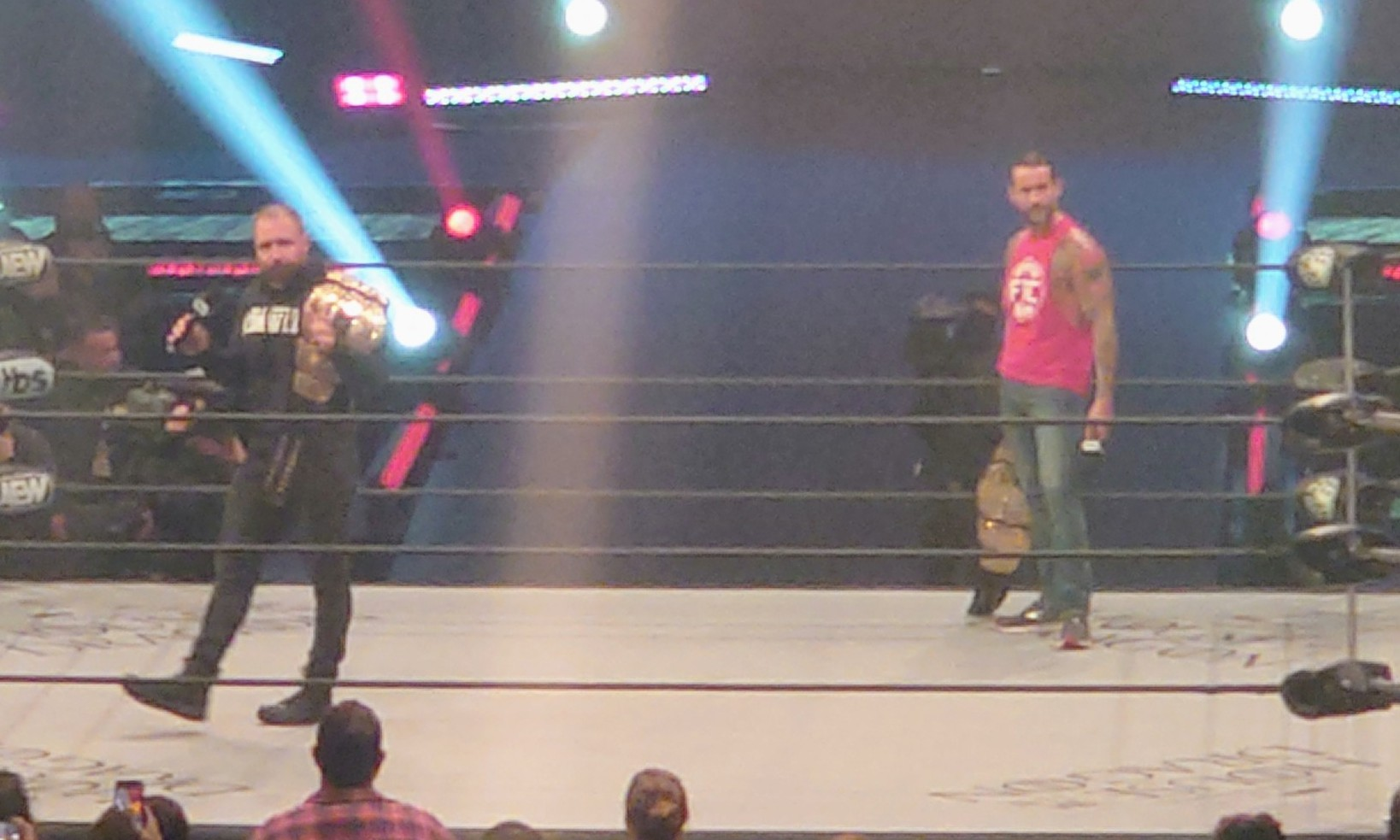
Interim champion Jon Moxley (left) and lineal champion CM Punk (right) on the August 17, 2022, episode of Dynamite, a week before their match to determine the undisputed AEW World Champion

On the June 3, 2022, episode of Rampage, reigning champion CM Punk, who had won the title just days prior at Double or Nothing, announced that he was injured and required surgery. He initially wanted to relinquish the title; however, AEW president Tony Khan decided that an interim champion would be crowned until Punk's return, after which, Punk would face the interim champion to determine the undisputed champion. To determine the interim champion, AEW set up the AEW Interim World Championship Eliminator Series that would culminate in a match at AEW x NJPW: Forbidden Door on June 26, a co-promoted event between AEW and New Japan Pro-Wrestling (NJPW). The first two matches took place on the June 8 episode of Dynamite. A Casino Battle Royale opened the show, which Kyle O'Reilly won. O'Reilly then faced the number one ranked singles competitor Jon Moxley in the main event of the episode, which Moxley won. The third match took place on June 12 at NJPW's Dominion 6.12 in Osaka-jo Hall between Hiroshi Tanahashi and Hirooki Goto, which Tanahashi won; Tanahashi was originally scheduled to face Punk at Forbidden Door for the title before Punk's injury. At Forbidden Door, Moxley defeated Tanahashi to become the interim AEW World Champion. Punk made his return in early August and was defeated by Moxley on the August 24 episode of Dynamite in a match to determine the undisputed champion.

During the All Out post-event media scrum on September 5, CM Punk, who had just won his second AEW World Championship at the event, got into a legitimate physical altercation backstage with AEW executive vice presidents The Elite (Kenny Omega, Matt Jackson, and Nick Jackson), following berating comments he had made about them and others during the scrum. As a result, AEW president Tony Khan suspended all involved. On the September 7 episode of Dynamite, Khan announced that both the World Championship and Trios Championship, held by The Elite, were vacated. Khan then announced that there would be a tournament to crown a new AEW World Champion. The AEW Grand Slam Tournament of Champions began that same episode and continued across episodes of Dynamite and Rampage until its conclusion at Dynamite: Grand Slam on September 21. Tournament competitors included Bryan Danielson, "Hangman" Adam Page, Sammy Guevara, Darby Allin, Chris Jericho, and Jon Moxley. In the tournament final at Grand Slam, Moxley defeated Danielson to win the championship for a record third time.

In January 2026 during MJF's second reign, he defended the AEW World Championship for the first time on the independent circuit. At Limitless Wrestling's event, Limitless Rumble, on January 16, 2026, MJF retained the title over Alec Price. The Wrestling Observer Newsletter reported that AEW's plan was that MJF would continue to defend the title on the indies, similar to touring world champions like Ric Flair, Harley Race, and Buddy Rogers, who defended the NWA World Heavyweight Championship across the National Wrestling Alliance's (NWA) territories, but MJF clarified that he would only do so against worthy opponents, implying that indie defenses would be rare occurrences.

=== "Real World Championship" / "One True Champion" (2023, 2026–present) ===
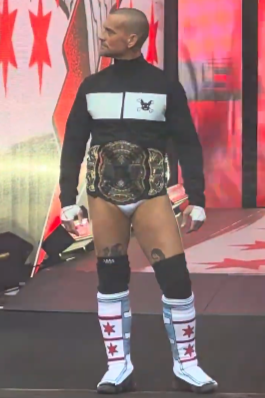
Two-time champion CM Punk with the unofficial "Real World Championship" at All In 2023.

CM Punk returned to AEW for the debut episode of Collision on June 17, 2023. During his promo, he held a red bag he described as containing "something he never lost". The following month, Punk unveiled the contents of the bag to be the AEW World Championship belt that he had won at the 2022 All Out. He subsequently referred to himself as the "real world's champion" as he was never defeated for the title, and then spray painted a black X on the center plate (the X being a symbol Punk has used throughout his career in reference to his straight edge lifestyle). While the "Real World Championship" was not officially recognized by AEW, Punk defended the title on AEW programming. However, following a legitimate backstage incident that occurred at All In on August 27, Punk's contract was terminated and the "Real World Championship" was subsequently dropped.

Three years later in mid-2026, AEW would revisit this concept, but with MJF. After MJF lost the AEW World Championship to Kenny Omega at Dynamite: Beach Break on July 8, 2026, MJF made his return a month later at Dynamite: Grand Slam Mexico with his custom Triple B championship belt, proclaiming himself to be the "one true champion". MJF also claimed he would defeat the "fake" champion to become recognized as the undisputed AEW World Champion.

== Belt design ==
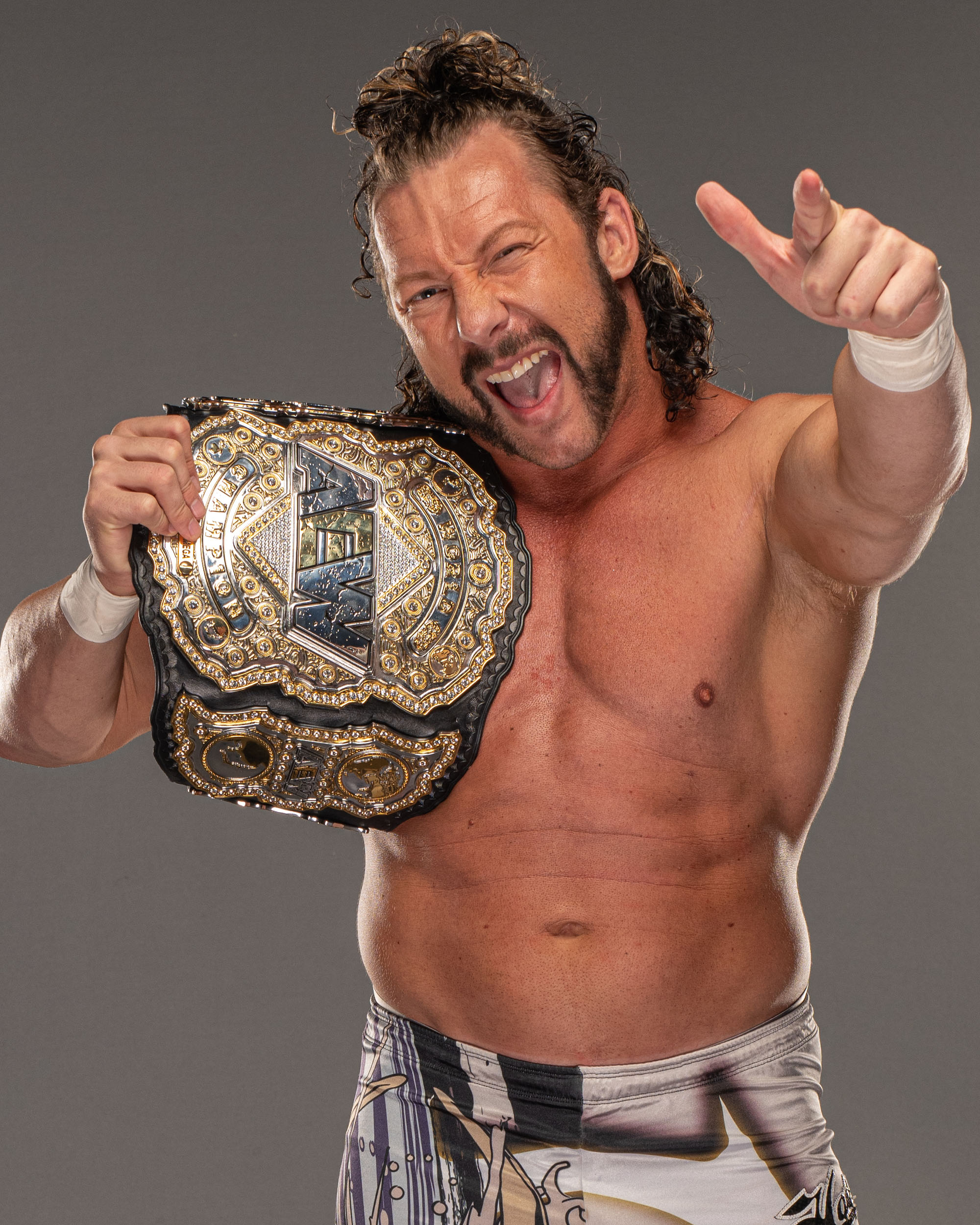
Two-time champion Kenny Omega with the first design of the title, in 2022

The standard AEW World Championship belt has five plates on a black leather strap, and the plates are silver and gold. The large center plate prominently has a relief AEW logo at the center, with a diamond outline behind the logo. Above the logo is a banner that reads "WORLD", while below the logo is another banner that reads "CHAMPION". At the end of each of these banners are parts of the globe. Below the lower banner is a nameplate to display the reigning champion's name. Filigree fills in the rest of the plate. The two inner side plates are tall and narrow. Originally, the inner side plates had AEW's logo at the center while above and below this logo were two halves of the globe. The two outer side plates were similar to the inner ones but slightly smaller. The belt design was inspired by the Mid-South North American Heavyweight Championship belt, and AEW wanted their design to be significantly similar to that belt. It was created by well-known professional wrestling championship belt maker Dave Millican.

After Samoa Joe won the championship at Worlds End on December 30, 2023, he ditched MJF's custom belt and brought back the standard championship belt at Dynamite: Homecoming on January 10, 2024, but with a slight change to the inner side plates, which were updated with a removable center section that can be customized with the reigning champion's logo (similar to WWE's championship belts). The default side plates consist of globes in the removable center section with AEW's logo sitting above and below it (essentially the reverse of the original design); the logo on the belt itself would receive a minor update in April 2024, changing the cracked texture to a smooth finish to come in line with the company's updated logo.

=== Custom designs ===
The original version of MJF's custom "Big Burberry Belt" (Triple B) used during his first reign from November 2022 to December 2023

The second version of MJF's custom "Big Burberry Belt", used three times, first from December 2025 to April 2026 and then May to July 2026. Since August 2026, he carries it around proclaiming to be the "one true champion" of All Elite Wrestling, although this is not officially recognized.

On the November 30, 2022, episode of Dynamite, reigning champion MJF, who had won the title at Full Gear on November 19, discarded the standard AEW World Championship belt, calling it trash, and unveiled his own custom version, which he dubbed the "Big Burberry Belt", or Triple B for short. It featured the exact same design as the standard belt; however, the leather strap was brown and fashioned in Burberry's trademark check pattern to match MJF's signature Burberry scarf. After winning his second AEW World Championship at Worlds End on December 27, 2025, MJF similarly discarded the standard belt at Dynamite: New Year's Smash on December 31 and reintroduced Triple B, albeit with a minor update in that it has custom "MJF" side plates.

On December 29, 2023, after the Clemson Tigers football team of Clemson University won the TaxSlayer Gator Bowl, AEW president Tony Khan presented the team's head coach, Dabo Swinney, with a custom AEW World Championship belt. It features the same design as the standard belt, but the inner side plates features the Tigers logo at the center with an inscription of the event, date, and location above and below the team's logo.

== Reigns ==
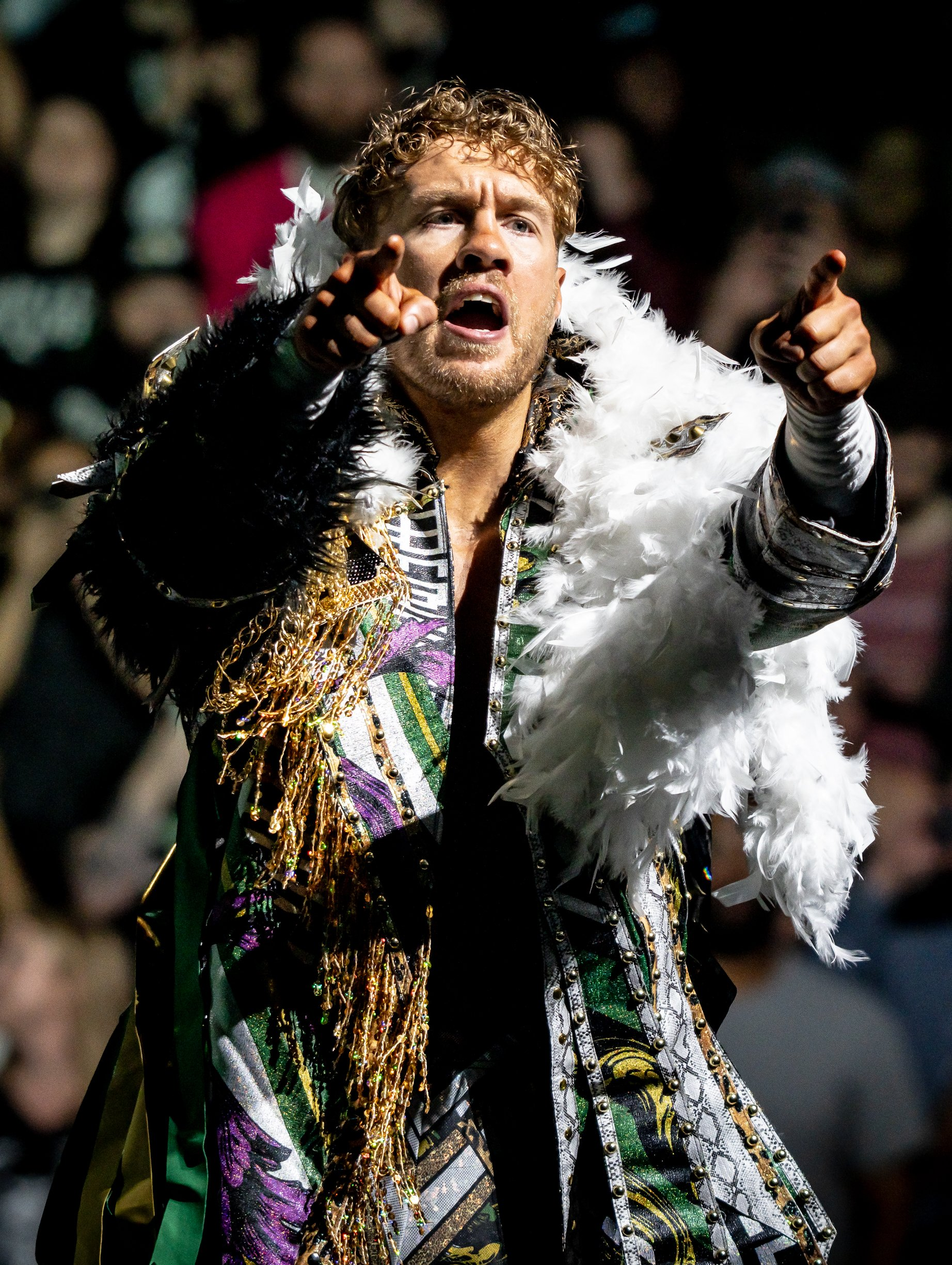
Current champion Will Ospreay

As of November 20, 2026, there have been 20 reigns between 11 champions and one vacancy, as well as one interim champion. Chris Jericho was the inaugural champion. Jon Moxley has the most reigns at four and also served as the interim champion in mid-2022 while reigning lineal champion CM Punk was out with an injury (this is not counted as one of Moxley's four reigns). MJF's first reign is the longest at 406 days, while Punk's second reign is the shortest at 3 days. Jericho is the oldest champion when he won it at 48 years old, while MJF is the youngest, first winning the title at 26 years old.

The current champion is Will Ospreay, who is in his first reign. He won the title by defeating previous champion Kenny Omega at All In on August 30, 2026, in London, England.
