= All Elite Wrestling casino matches =

Professional wrestling match type

As part of a general theme, the American professional wrestling promotion All Elite Wrestling utilises various casino-themed matches: the Casino Battle Royale, a 21-man rumble-rules battle royal; the Casino Ladder Match, a nine-man ladder match where the prize – a large poker chip suspended above the ring – signifies a future AEW World Championship opportunity; and the Casino Gauntlet match, a gauntlet match where entrants gradually fill the ring and the first participant to score a pinfall or submission wins the gauntlet.

== History ==
The first Casino Battle Royale occurred during the pre-show of AEW's inaugural event, Double or Nothing in May 2019, and was a men's match. The winner of this first match was entered into the match to determine the inaugural holder of the AEW World Championship at All Out in August of that year. The second Casino Battle Royale was a women's match and was held during the pre-show of the All Out event mentioned above. Like the first, the winner of this second iteration was entered into the match to determine the inaugural holder of the AEW Women's World Championship on the debut episode of AEW's weekly television show, Dynamite. Further Casino Battle Royales took place at All Out in 2020, Double or Nothing in 2021, and on Dynamite in 2022 for men, and at All Out in 2021 for women. A tag team variation of the match, called the Casino Tag Team Royale, was first utilized at Revolution in March 2021, where the prize was AEW World Tag Team Championship match – and on the episodes of Dynamite immediately preceding the Revolution pay-per-view in 2022 and 2023. In December 2022, a version for three-man teams was established called the Casino Trios Royale, where the winning team would split $300,000. The Battle Royale was supplemented by the Casino Ladder match – a ladder match in which the prize, a large poker chip, is suspended above the ring – in 2020, and by the Casino Gauntlet match – a modified gauntlet match – in 2024.

== Rules ==
=== Casino Battle Royale ===
The Casino Battle Royale is a modified rumble rules battle royal that features 21 entrants. It begins with a group of five wrestlers, and every three minutes, another group of five wrestlers enters, while the 21st and final entrant enters alone. The wrestlers are grouped based on the suit they drew from a deck of cards—spades, diamonds, clubs, or hearts—and the order of when each group enters is based on a random draw of the cards. The 21st and final entrant is the wrestler who drew the joker. The winner receives a world championship match of their respective gender's division—either the AEW World Championship or the AEW Women's World Championship.

For tag teams and trios, rumble rules are also implemented, but participating teams are not grouped by card suit; instead, one new team enters every 90 seconds. Individual eliminations occur when a wrestler has gone over the top rope and both feet hit the floor; a team is eliminated when both members of the team have been ruled out of the match. The match ends when one wrestler or team is left.

=== Casino Ladder match ===
The Casino Ladder match is a modified ladder match where the prize, a large poker chip suspended above the ring, signifies an AEW World Championship opportunity. The match has nine entrants: two participants start the match in the ring, and an additional wrestler enters the match every ninety seconds. The poker chip above the ring may be retrieved at any point during the match, even if not all entrants have participated. The first ladder match took place at Double or Nothing in 2020 and was won by the debuting Brian Cage. Further Casino Ladder matches took place on the 2021 anniversary episode of Dynamite, which was won by "Hangman" Adam Page, and at All Out in 2022, which was won by MJF.

=== Casino Gauntlet match ===
The Casino Gauntlet match is a modified gauntlet match. Featuring a maximum of 21 participants, the match starts with two wrestlers in the ring and new entrants enter at randomly-timed intervals. The match may end at any time by pinfall or submission, even if not all 21 participants have taken part in the match. The first Casino Gauntlet match, on the April 24, 2024 episode of Dynamite, was won by Will Ospreay, who earned an International Championship match at Double or Nothing; the prize for subsequent matches has typically been a world championship opportunity in the division. Before Forbidden Door in 2025, open-ended contracts could be executed at any time at the holder's discretion, not dissimilar to the rules of WWE's Money in the Bank concept; after that show, AEW president Tony Khan announced that any future matches guaranteed by the contract would require one week of advance notice.

== Winners ==
=== Casino Battle Royale ===
Men's Casino Battle Royale winners
#	Event	Date	Winner	Title shot	Draw	Ref
1	Double or Nothing	May 25, 2019	"Hangman" Adam Page	Inaugural World Championship match at All Out	Joker	
2	All Out	September 5, 2020	Lance Archer	World Championship match on the Dynamite anniversary episode	Spades	
3	Double or Nothing	May 30, 2021	Jungle Boy	World Championship match on Dynamite	Spades	
4	Dynamite	June 8, 2022	Kyle O'Reilly	An opportunity to qualify for the AEW Interim World Championship Eliminator Series	Spades	

Women's Casino Battle Royale winners
#	Event	Date	Winner	Prize	Draw	Ref
1	All Out	August 31, 2019	Nyla Rose	Inaugural Women's World Championship match on the Dynamite debut episode	Clubs	
2	All Out	September 5, 2021	Ruby Soho	Women's World Championship match at Grand Slam	Joker	

Casino Tag Team Royale winners
#	Event	Date	Winner	Prize	Draw	Ref
1	Revolution	March 7, 2021	Death Triangle (Pac and Rey Fénix)	World Tag Team Championship match on Dynamite	14	
2	Dynamite	March 2, 2022	The Young Bucks (Matt Jackson and Nick Jackson)	World Tag Team Championship match at Revolution	11	
3	Dynamite	March 1, 2023	Danhausen and Orange Cassidy	World Tag Team Championship match at Revolution	9	

Casino Trios Royale winners
#	Event	Date	Winner	Prize	Draw	Ref
1	Rampage: Holiday Bash	December 23, 2022	AR Fox and Top Flight (Dante and Darius Martin)	$300,000	8	

=== Casino Ladder match ===
#	Event	Date	Winner	Prize	Draw	Ref
1	Double or Nothing	May 23, 2020	Brian Cage	World Championship match at Fight for the Fallen	9	
2	Dynamite: Anniversary	October 6, 2021	"Hangman" Adam Page	World Championship match at Full Gear	9	
3	All Out	September 4, 2022	MJF	World Championship match at Full Gear	8	

=== Casino Gauntlet match ===
Men's Casino Gauntlet winners
#	Event	Date	Winner	Prize	Draw	Ref
1	Dynamite	April 24, 2024	Will Ospreay	International Championship match at Double or Nothing	5	
2	Dynamite	May 29, 2024	Will Ospreay	World Championship match at Forbidden Door	4	
3	All In	August 25, 2024	Christian Cage	World Championship match contract	11	
4	Dynamite	September 11, 2024	Kyle Fletcher and Will Ospreay	World Tag Team Championship match at Grand Slam	2	
5	Dynamite	January 8, 2025	Powerhouse Hobbs	World Championship match at Maximum Carnage	7	
6	All In	July 12, 2025	MJF	World Championship match contract	2	
7	Full Gear	November 22, 2025	Ricochet	Inaugural National Championship	3	
8	Dynasty	April 12, 2026	Kevin Knight	Vacant AEW TNT Championship	9	
9	All In	August 30, 2026	Andrade El Ídolo	World Championship match contract	1	

Women's Casino Gauntlet winners
#	Event	Date	Winner	Prize	Draw	Ref
1	Dynamite: Maximum Carnage	January 15, 2025	"Timeless" Toni Storm	Women's World Championship match at Grand Slam Australia	6	
2	All In	July 12, 2025	Athena	Women's World Championship match contract	9	
3	Dynamite: Beach Break	July 8, 2026	Willow Nightingale	Women's World Championship match at Redemption	8	

== Championship opportunities ==
– Win
– Loss

Casino match winner championship opportunities
	Winner	Event	Date	Championship match
1	"Hangman" Adam Page	All Out	August 31, 2019	Lost to Chris Jericho for the inaugural AEW World Championship
2	Nyla Rose	Dynamite debut episode	October 2, 2019	Lost to Riho for the inaugural AEW Women's World Championship
3	Brian Cage	Fight for the Fallen	July 15, 2020	Lost to Jon Moxley for the AEW World Championship
4	Lance Archer	Dynamite: Anniversary	October 14, 2020	Lost to Jon Moxley in a No Disqualification match for the AEW World Championship
5	Death Triangle (Pac and Rey Fénix)	Dynamite	April 14, 2021	Lost to The Young Bucks (Matt Jackson and Nick Jackson) for the AEW World Tag Team Championship
6	Jungle Boy	Dynamite	June 26, 2021	Lost to Kenny Omega for the AEW World Championship
7	Ruby Soho	Dynamite: Grand Slam	September 22, 2021	Lost to Dr. Britt Baker, D.M.D. for the AEW Women's World Championship
8	"Hangman" Adam Page	Full Gear	November 13, 2021	Defeated Kenny Omega for the AEW World Championship
9	The Young Bucks (Matt Jackson and Nick Jackson)	Revolution	March 6, 2022	Lost to Jurassic Express (Jungle Boy and Luchasaurus) for the AEW World Tag Team Championship. This was a three-way match also involving reDRagon (Bobby Fish and Kyle O'Reilly).
10	Kyle O'Reilly	Dynamite	June 8, 2022	Lost to Jon Moxley in the AEW Interim World Championship Eliminator Series. Moxley subsequently defeated Hiroshi Tanahashi for the AEW Interim World Championship at Forbidden Door.
11	MJF	Full Gear	November 19, 2022	Defeated Jon Moxley for the AEW World Championship
12	Danhausen and Orange Cassidy	Revolution	March 5, 2023	Lost to The Gunns (Austin Gunn and Colten Gunn) for the AEW World Tag Team Championship. This was a four-way match also involving The Acclaimed (Anthony Bowens and Max Caster) and Jay Lethal and Jeff Jarrett.
13	Will Ospreay	Double or Nothing	May 26, 2024	Defeated Roderick Strong for the AEW International Championship
14	Will Ospreay	Forbidden Door	June 30, 2024	Lost to Swerve Strickland for the AEW World Championship
15	Kyle Fletcher and Will Ospreay	Dynamite: Grand Slam	September 25, 2024	Lost to The Young Bucks (Matthew Jackson and Nicholas Jackson) for the AEW World Tag Team Championship
16	Powerhouse Hobbs	Dynamite: Maximum Carnage	January 15, 2025	Lost to Jon Moxley for the AEW World Championship
17	"Timeless" Toni Storm	Grand Slam Australia	February 15, 2025	Defeated Mariah May for the AEW Women's World Championship
18	Christian Cage	Revolution	March 9, 2025	Lost to Jon Moxley for the AEW World Championship. This was originally a singles match between Moxley and Cope, but Cage executed his contract during the match to convert it into a three-way match.
19	Athena	Forbidden Door	August 24, 2025	Lost to "Timeless" Toni Storm for the AEW Women's World Championship
20	MJF	Worlds End	December 27, 2025	MJF originally executed his contract to guarantee a match at Forbidden Door against then-champion "Hangman" Adam Page, but later forced Page to give him a match without needing to execute the contract. Later won the AEW World Championship by defeating previous champion Samoa Joe, Swerve Strickland, and "Hangman" Adam Page in a four-way match.
21	Willow Nightingale	Redemption	July 26, 2026	Defeated Thekla for the AEW Women's World Championship

== See also ==
- André the Giant Memorial Battle Royal
- Honor Rumble
- Gauntlet for the Gold
- Money in the Bank ladder match
- Royal Rumble match
