= Gordon Greenberg =

American theater director

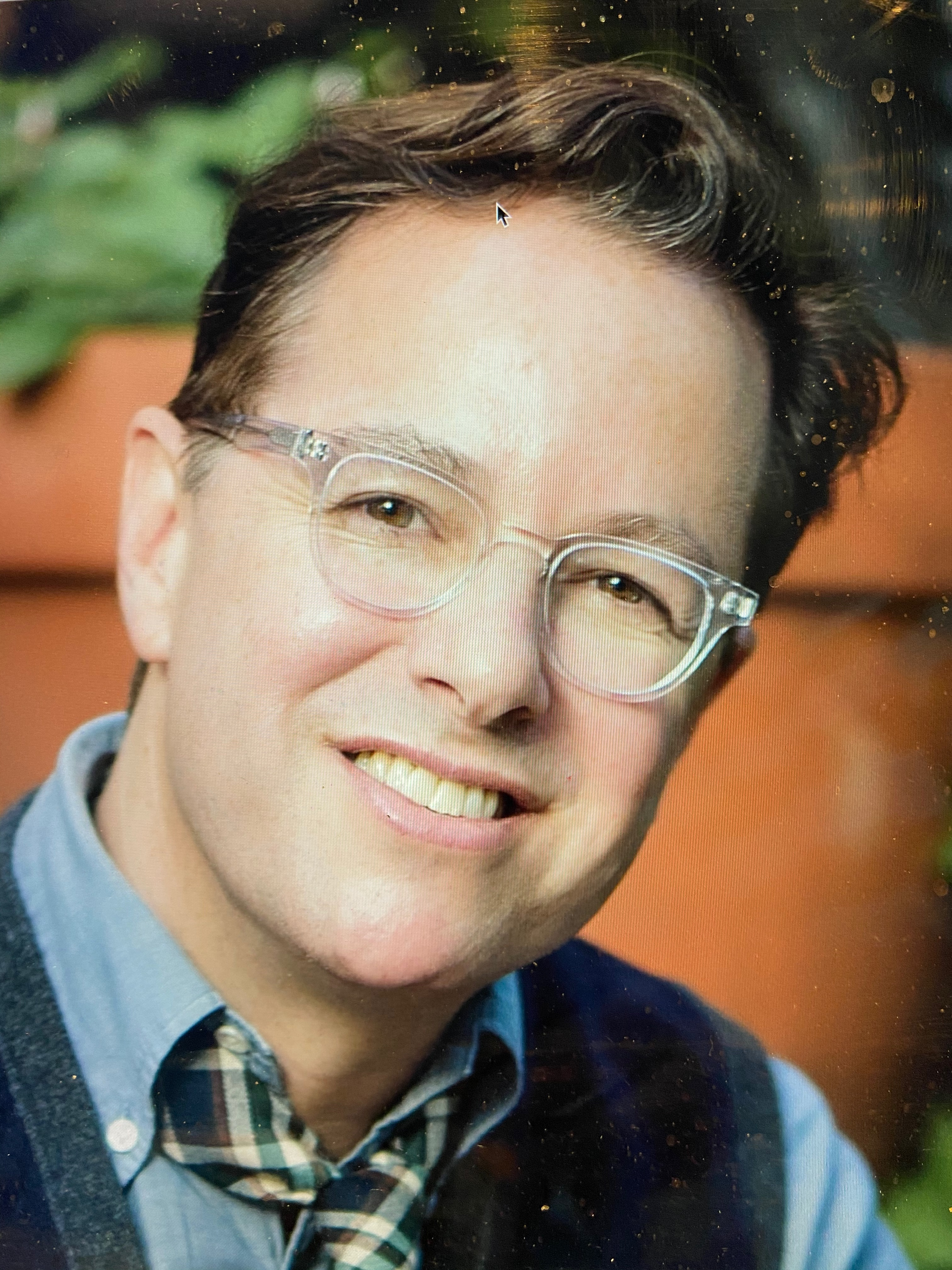
- Greenberg in Brooklyn, New York
- Born: 1969 (age 56–57); Mineral Wells, Texas, U.S.
- Education: Stanford University; New York University Film School Royal Academy of Dramatic Art
- Occupation: Theatre Director Playwright Screenwriter
- Notable work: Who's Afraid of Virginia Woolf? Dracula A Comedy of Terrors; Crime & Punishment A Comedy; Piaf/Dietrich: A Legendary Affair; Guys and Dolls Savoy Theatre; Holiday Inn (musical); Jacques Brel Is Alive and Well and Living in Paris; Working (musical)
- Website: www.gordongreenberg.com

Gordon Greenberg (born 1969) is an American stage director, a theater and television writer, and an Artistic Associate at The New Group.

== Education ==
Greenberg attended Stanford University and NYU Film School Tisch School of the Arts, as well as The Lincoln Center Theatre Directors Lab, The Royal Academy of Dramatic Art, and Stagedoor Manor.

== Career ==
Greenberg directed and developed the stage adaptation of Single White Female in the United Kingdom for Ambassador Theatre Group to strong reviews, The Arts Review proclaiming "From its blood stained opening, through its final surprise ending, Single White Female takes the nail biting tension of the original and catapults it into the 21st century, doing so with style and verve" and Theatre and Tonic calling it "modern, intense and genuinely absorbing."

His revival of the Stephen Schwartz musical The Baker's Wife starring Ariana DeBose and Scott Bakula at Classic Stage Company was widely praised, with Time Out New York calling it "a thoroughly enchanting revival", The New York Times calling it "a wonderfully realized production", and The Wrap calling it "the year's best musical revival". It was nominated for 7 Drama Desk Awards

He directed the Huey Lewis-inspired Broadway musical The Heart of Rock & Roll at the James Earl Jones Theatre. It received excellent reviews, with the New York Daily News calling it "The sleeper hit of the season", Vulture calling it "The funniest new musical of the season", The New York Times calling it "Pure fun" and the New York Post calling it "A knockout comedy".

He directed and co-wrote (with Steve Rosen) Dracula, A Comedy of Terrors! which received excellent reviews Off-Broadway at New World Stages and was recorded as a radio play starring John Stamos, Laura Benanti, Annaleigh Ashford, Alex Brightman, Ashley Park, James Monroe Iglehart, Christopher Sieber, Richard Kind and Rob McClure.

He and Rosen also wrote Crime & Punishment, A Comedy, which was commissioned by the Old Globe Theatre and premiered under his direction in 2023 to rave reviews.

He directed Who's Afraid of Virginia Woolf? at the Geffen Playhouse starring Calista Flockhart and Zachary Quinto. It was widely praised. Entertainment Weekly called it "A brilliantly staged riveting portrait of toxic domestic bliss." Variety said "A fearless Calista Flockhart tears into Zachary Quinto in the inspired 60th Anniversary Revival." The Los Angeles Times called the feature "Unerringly good...Quinto and Flockhart expose something infinitely fragile in Albee's shatterproof play." It won the L.A. Drama Critics Circle Award for Best Revival.

For television, he developed, co-wrote (with Michael Weiner) and was Co-Executive Producer on Most Talkative, a new comedy television series for NBC and Blumhouse based on Andy Cohen's coming of age in St. Louis. He is currently writing a new musical about Pablo Picasso with Stephen Schwartz and Caridad Svich for Antonio Banderas. He is also co-writing a new musical about Harry Houdini in collaboration with composer Frank Wildhorn.

He directed the American premier of Piaf/Dietrich, A Legendary Affair for Mirvish in Toronto, which opened to rave reviews, was extended three times and was nominated for 7 Dora Awards and won Best Musical Production.

He directed the Broadway adaptation of Irving Berlin's film Holiday Inn. Greenberg also co-wrote the adaptation (with Chad Hodge). Produced by the Roundabout Theatre Company and Universal Pictures Stage Productions, the show was well received by critics, with Variety noting that "the 1942 film has gotten a complete and first-class stage redo [...] turning this shaky fixer-upper into prime property."

His revival of Guys and Dolls received excellent reviews and was nominated for six Olivier Awards. It premiered at Chichester Festival Theatre and then ran in London's West End at the Savoy Theatre then at the Phoenix Theatre, where it starred Rebel Wilson. In his review for the New York Times, Ben Brantley called it "Pure, unforced pleasure...a boozy bawdy party."

Greenberg directed and adapted the revised production of Working (adapted and revised with composers Stephen Schwartz and Lin-Manuel Miranda). The revival was presented at Broadway in Chicago's Broadway Playhouse at Water Tower Place, as well as the 59 E 59 Theatre in New York, the Old Globe in San Diego and Asolo Repertory Theatre. It received a Drama Desk Award for Outstanding Ensemble Performances and was nominated for a Drama Desk Award for Outstanding Revival. It was generally positively-reviewed by critics, with New York One writing that "the revisions, under Gordon Greenberg's imaginatively resourceful direction, hit all the right notes."

Greenberg revised and directed the Drama Desk Award-winning revival of Jacques Brel Is Alive and Well and Living in Paris (Drama Desk, Outer Critics, Drama League nominations for Best Revival of a Musical), which garnered excellent reviews. Charles Isherwood of the New York Times called it a "powerful revival" and Elysa Gardner of USA Today wrote that Greenberg "captures what made Brel's oeuvre at once distinctly of a certain place and time and enduringly universal."

He directed the new stage adaptation of Tangled for Disney.

He has written original movie musicals for Nickelodeon called Emerald City Music Hall and another for The Disney Channel titled Scramble Band, with Michael Weiner.

His other work includes Johnny Baseball at Williamstown Theatre Festival, a workshop of a newly revised Rags for Roundabout Theatre Company, Pirates!, or Gilbert & Sullivan Plunder'd, conceived with Nell Benjamin and John McDaniel; the U.S. national tour of Guys and Dolls, Floyd Collins for Signature Theatre, Stars of David based on Abby Pogrebin's book for producer Daryl Roth, Farewell My Concubine (China) and several television projects, and 1776 for Paper Mill Playhouse. He co-wrote and directed the show Band Geeks for Goodspeed Musicals, supported by grants from the NEA and NAMT. He worked with Kirsten Childs on Disney's Believe, a new musical for Disney Creative Entertainment, the launch show for the Disney Fantasy with Neil Patrick Harris and Jerry Seinfeld, the U.S. National tour of Happy Days (by Garry Marshall); and worked extensively with Stephen Schwartz and Joseph Stein to revise The Baker's Wife in a critically acclaimed production at Paper Mill Playhouse starring Alice Ripley. Further work includes Half a Sixpence, the South African-inspired production of Jesus Christ Superstar, the U.S. National tour of Peter Pan, We The People: America Rocks at the off-Broadway Lucille Lortel Theater, and contemporary dramas including 33 Variations. He is the writer of a new musical updating Jane Austen's Emma to the Helen Gurley Brown 1960s New York, The Single Girls Guide which he developed at Seattle Fifth Avenue Theatre, Dallas Theater Center, Ars Nova, Goodspeed Musicals, ASCAP and a developmental production at Capital Rep and then NAMT.

Formerly an actor, Greenberg appeared in the Broadway productions of How to Succeed in Business Without Really Trying; Grease; The Little Prince and the Aviator; and Off-Broadway in Peacetime; Names; City Suite; Show Me Where the Good Times Are; and on television in Shaky Ground, Knots Landing, Living Single, Step By Step; and on film in New York City Serenade directed by Frank Whaley.

Greenberg produced and directed commercials for J. Walter Thompson from 1991 to 1993. He served as the artistic director of Musical Theatre Works in New York City from 1997 to 2000, and currently serves as artistic director of the Broadway Teachers Workshop. and Artistic Associate at The New Group.

Greenberg adapted (with Steve Rosen) and directed The Secret Of My Success, a musical comedy based on the 1987 movie of the same name, as a Broadway musical for Universal Pictures. The musical was mid-run for its world premiere and pre-Broadway tryout at the Paramount Theatre in March 2020 with Sydney Morton (Christy Lockhart) and Billy Harrigan Tighe (Brantley Foster/Carlton Whitfield) as leads when production was shut down due to the coronavirus pandemic. It had been scheduled to run from February 21 – March 29, and the final performance was March 12, as Illinois governor J. B. Pritzker shut down all performance venues starting March 13.

== Awards ==
- The Baker's Wife Classic Stage Company 2026 Drama Desk Award nomination Best Direction of a Musical, 7 Drama Desk Award nominations including Best Revival of a Musical
- Who's Afraid of Virginia Woolf? Geffen Playhouse 2022 L.A. Drama Critics Circle Award for Best Revival. 6 Los Angeles Drama Critics Circle Award Nominations including Best Director
- Piaf/Dietrich 2020 Dora Award for Outstanding Production, Musical Theatre 7 Dora Award Nominations, including Best Director
- Holiday Inn Outer Critics Circle Award Nomination for Outstanding New Broadway Musical
- Guys and Dolls 6 Olivier Award nominations, including Best Revival
- Working Drama Desk Award for Outstanding Ensemble Performances Drama Desk Award Nomination for Outstanding Revival.
- Jacques Brel Is Alive and Well and Living in Paris Drama Desk, Outer Critics, Drama League nominations for Best Revival of a Musical
- Guys and Dolls St. Louis Theatre Circle nominations, Best Director, Best Production
- West Side Story St. Louis Theatre Circle Award nominations, Best Director, Best Production
- Vanities, A New Musical Bay Area Critics Circle Award, Best Production

== See also ==
- Broadway Teachers Workshop
