= Giovanna Reynaud =

Mexican actress and model

- Born: 16 July 1997 (age 27); Guadalajara, Mexico
- Other names: Gio
- Occupations: Actress; Model
- Years active: 2016–present
- Spouse: Pasquale Di Nuzzo (m. 2020)

Giovanna Reynaud (born 16 July 1997) is a Mexican actress and model, known for her portrayals of Gala in the Disney XD original series Jungle Nest (2016) and Emilia in the Disney Channel Argentinian telenovela Soy Luna (2017–2018).

== Life and career ==
She studied theater at the Broadway Teachers Workshop in New York and specialized in acting, singing, modeling, jazz, and hip hop at the Institute of Theatrical Art Training of Mexico. Since then, she has played various roles in children's plays and musicals in her native Mexico, among which stand out Tangled as Rapunzel, Tarzan as Jane, and The Princess and the Toad as Charlotte. In addition, she made commercials for television and participated in music videos of well-known Mexican bands.

In 2016, she travelled to Argentina to participate in the Disney XD LA series Jungle Nest, her debut on television. Reynaud portrayed the character of Gala, a vain girl. In 2017, she joined Season 2 of Soy Luna as Emilia in a recurring role. She was upgraded to a series regular for Season 3 and participated in the farewell tour Soy Luna en Vivo.

== Personal life ==
Reynaud has a sister named Ana Sofía. As of 25 July 2018, Reynaud has been dating her Soy Luna co-star Pasquale Di Nuzzo. On 20 June 2020, they announced they were engaged. They were married at La Cima del Copal in Jalisco, Mexico on 29 August 2020.

== Filmography ==
Television and film roles
Year	Title	Role	Notes
2016	Jungle Nest	Gala	Main role
2017–2018	Soy Luna	Emilia Mansfield	Recurring role (season 2); main cast (season 3)
2021	Soy Luna: El último concierto	Herself / Emilia Mansfield	Disney+ special
2021	El rey de todo el mundo	Julia	
2022	Daddies on Request	Denisse	Recurring role (season 1)
2022	High Heat	Mayte	Recurring role (season 1)
2023	Mother's Day Is Cancelled	Sofía	Amazon Prime Video original film

== Awards and nominations ==
Year	Award	Category	Work	Result
2016	Kids' Choice Awards Colombia	Favorite Actress	Jungle Nest	Nominated
2018	Kids' Choice Awards Mexico	Favorite Villain	Soy Luna	Won

== Tours ==
- Soy Luna En Vivo (2018)
