= Ignacio Guadalupe =

Mexican actor

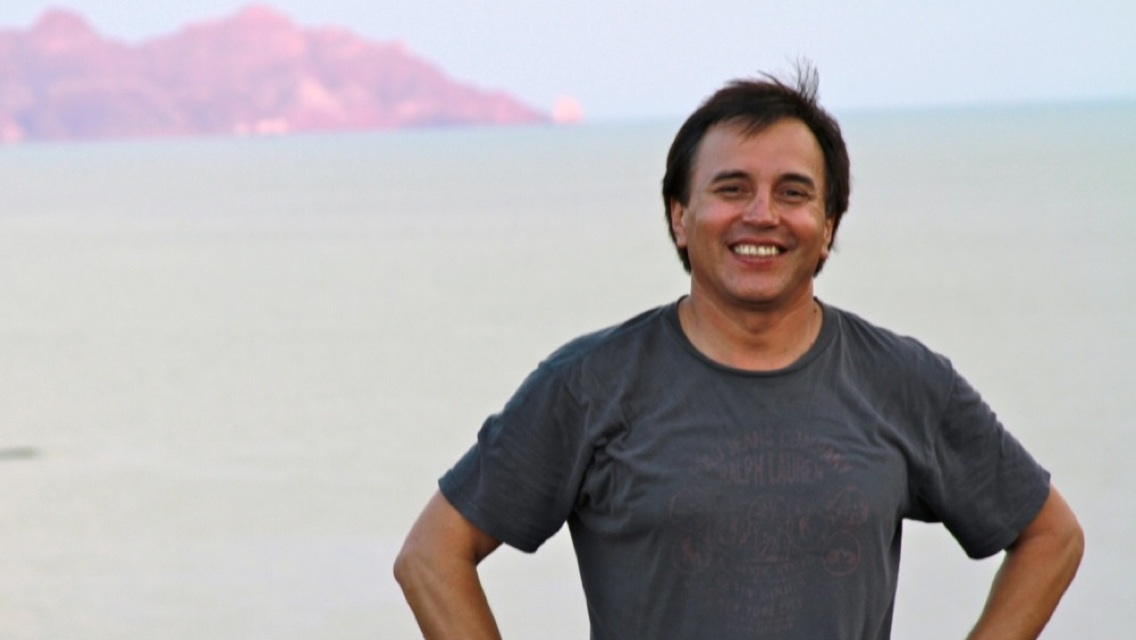
- Guadalupe in 2013
- Born: Ignacio Guadalupe Martínez Martán; 13 March 1960 (age 66); Naco, Sonora, Mexico
- Education: National Autonomous University of Mexico
- Occupation: Actor
- Years active: 1980–present

Ignacio Guadalupe Martínez Martán (born 13 March 1960), known professionally as Ignacio Guadalupe, is a Mexican film, television and stage actor.

== Early life ==
Guadalupe was born in Naco, Sonora on 13 March 1960. He moved to Mexico City where he studied Communication Studies at the National Autonomous University of Mexico and Acting at the Centro Universitario de Teatro.

== Career ==
Guadalupe debuted as an actor in the television series Mein Freund Winnetou in 1980. He later made his film debut in Vidas errantes, he was nominated for an Ariel Award for Best Actor and won a Diosas de Plata Award for Best Newcomer for his performance in the film. Besides this, he also worked as a writer for the television show La hora marcada.

In 1990, Guadalupe participated in Pueblo de madera, a performance that earned him a nomination for the Ariel Award for Best Supporting Actor.

Since then, Guadalupe has acted mainly in television, participating in telenovelas and TV series, but also in films: most notably in The Three Burials of Melquiades Estrada in 2005 and For Greater Glory in 2012.

== Filmography ==
=== Film ===
Year	Title	Role	Notes
1985	Vidas errantes	Guillermo	Nominated — Ariel Award for Best Actor
1985	El ombligo de la luna	Ricardo	
1986	Chido Guan, el tacos de oro	Jorge Torres	
1990	Pueblo de madera	Nino	Nominated — Ariel Award for Best Supporting Actor
2003	Zurdo	Julián	
2003	Dirt	Rodolfo	
2004	Al otro lado	Rafael	
2005	The Three Burials of Melquiades Estrada	Lucio	
2007	Under the Same Moon	Leonardo Sánchez Nava	
2012	For Greater Glory	Bishop Pascual Díaz	
2023	Mother's Day Is Cancelled	Jaime	

=== Television ===
Year	Title	Role	Notes
1980	Mein Freund Winnetou	Chihuahua	
1999	Infierno en el paraíso	Poncho	
2000	Abrázame muy fuerte	Benito	
2002	La Otra	Santos Mérida	
2003–04	Mariana de la Noche	Mediomundo Páramo	4 episodes
2005	Barrera de amor	Teodoro Sánchez	
2009	Mujeres asesinas	Tramoyista	Episode: "Ana y Paula, ultrajadas"
2009	Los simuladores	Oficial Fernández	Episode: "Fin de semana"
2009–10	Corazón salvaje	Pedro	135 episodes
2010–11	Los Héroes del Norte	Procopio	5 episodes
2011	La fuerza del destino	Benito	72 episodes
2012–18	Como dice el dicho	Several roles	7 episodes
2013	Mentir para Vivir	Manolo	50 episodes
2016	La querida del Centauro	Comisario Manuel Salgado	40 episodes
2016	40 y 20	Don Chilo	Episode: "No hace falta"
2016	Pasión y poder	Obdulio	16 episodes
2016	Hasta que te conocí	Prefecto	2 episodes
2017	Mi adorable maldición	Anselmo Sánchez	2 episodes
2017	El César	Don Rodolfo Chávez	7 episodes
2017–18	Sin tu mirada	Baldomero	96 episodes

== Awards and nominations ==
=== Ariel Awards ===
Guadalupe has twice been nominated for an Ariel Award, awarded by the Mexican Academy of Film.

Year	Work	Category	Result	Ref
1985	Vidas errantes	Best Actor	Nominated	
1990	Pueblo de madera	Best Supporting Actor	Nominated	
