= List of MLW World Tag Team Champions =

The MLW World Tag Team Championship is a professional wrestling world tag team championship that is owned by the Major League Wrestling (MLW) promotion That is generally contested in professional wrestling matches, in which participants usually execute scripted finishes rather than contend in direct competition.

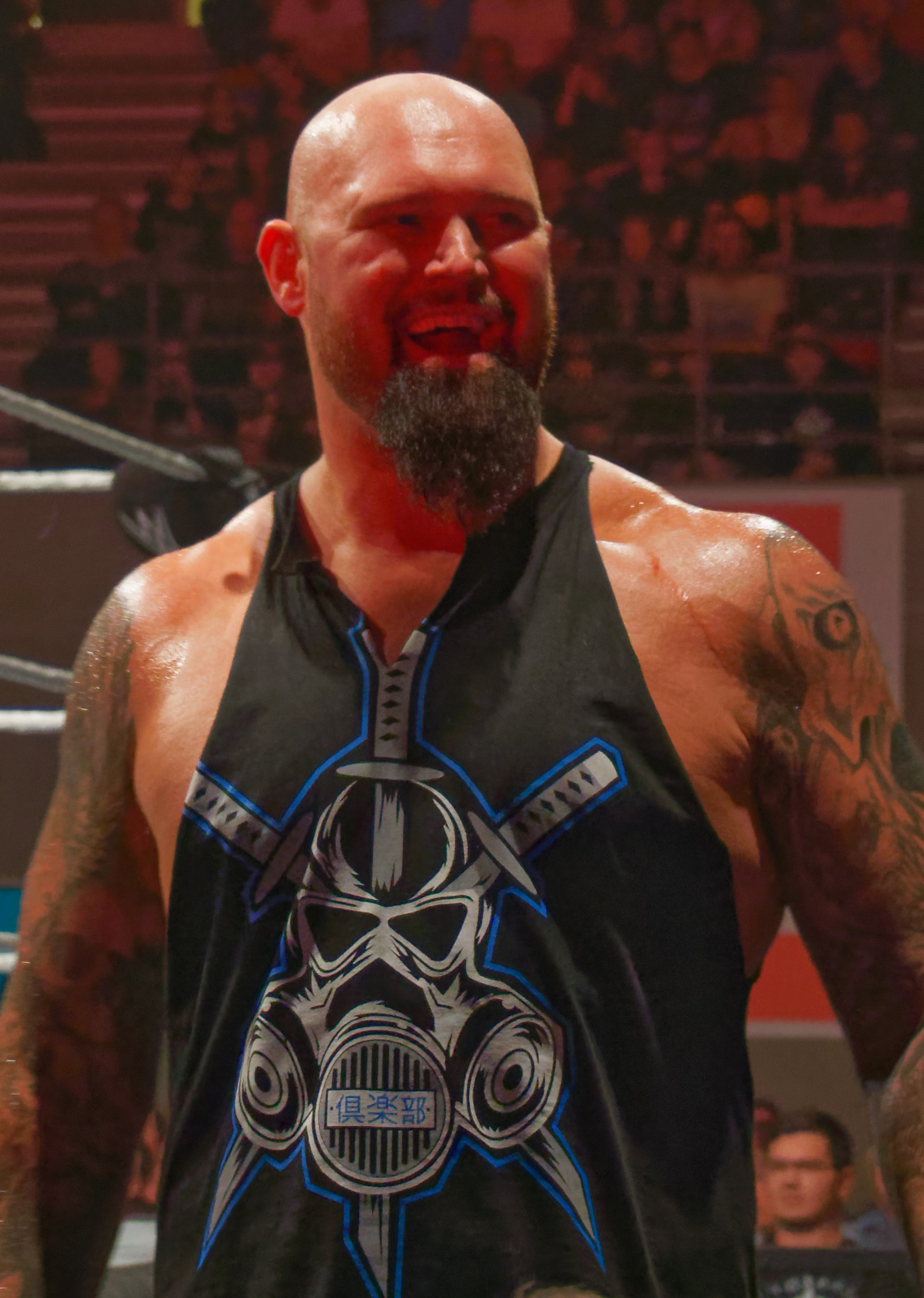
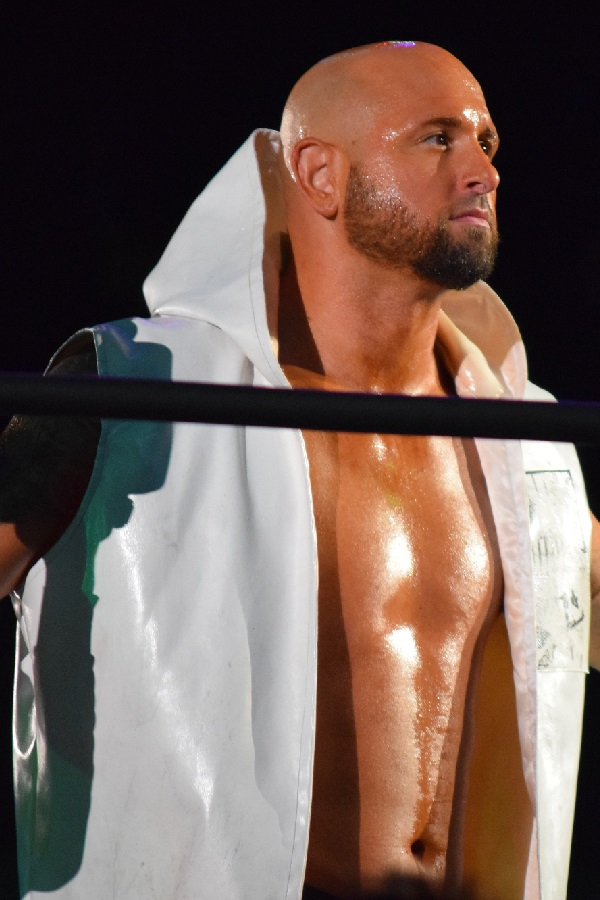
Current champions Doc Gallows and Karl Anderson

As of November 16, 2026, there have been eighteen reigns between seventeen teams composed of 34 individual champions and two vacancies. The inaugural champions were The Extreme Horsemen (C.W. Anderson and Simon Diamond). The Von Erichs (Marshall and Ross Von Erich) reign is the longest at 438 days, while World Titan Federation (Tom Lawlor and Davey Boy Smith Jr.) have the shortest reign at 53 days. L.A. Park is the oldest champion at 55 while MJF is the youngest at 23.

The current champions are The Good Brothers (Doc Gallows and Karl Anderson), who are in their first reign as a team and individually. They won the titles by defeating The Skyscrapers (Donovan Dijak and Bishop Dyer) in a Tennessee Tornado match on the May 9, 2026 episode of Fusion in Chattanooga, Tennessee.

== Reigns ==
=== Names ===
Name	Years
MLW Global Tag Team Crown Championship	April 21, 2003 – February 10, 2004
MLW World Tag Team Championship	June 7, 2018 – present

Key
No.	Overall reign number
Reign	Reign number for the specific team—reign numbers for the individuals are in parentheses, if different
Days	Number of days held
+	Current reign is changing daily

No.	Champion	Championship change			Reign statistics		Notes	Ref.
No.	Champion	Date	Event	Location	Reign	Days	Notes	Ref.
Major League Wrestling (MLW)
1	The Extreme Horsemen (C.W. Anderson and Simon Diamond)	May 9, 2003	Revolutions	Orlando, Florida	1	277	The Extreme Horsemen defeated Steve Williams and P.J. Friedman in a four-team single-elimination tournament to become the inaugural champions.	
—	Vacated	February 10, 2004	—	—	—	—	The Extreme Horsemen were no longer listed as the MLW Global Crown Tag Team Champions after the company stopped hosting events.	
—	Deactivated	2004	—	—	—	—	The title became deactivated when the company stopped hosting events.	
2	The Lucha Brothers (Pentagón Jr. and Rey Fénix)	June 7, 2018	Fusion	Orlando, Florida	1	240	The Lucha Brothers defeated Team TBD (Jason Cade and Jimmy Yuta) and The Dirty Blondes (Leo Brien and Michael Patrick) in a three-way elimination match to win the revived championship. The episode aired on tape delay on June 15, 2018. During this reign, the championship's name was changed to the MLW World Tag Team Championship.	
3	The Hart Foundation (Teddy Hart, Davey Boy Smith Jr., and Brian Pillman Jr.)	February 2, 2019	SuperFight 2019	Philadelphia, Pennsylvania	1	154	Hart and Smith won the titles, but Pillman was allowed to defend via Freebird rule	
4	The Dynasty (Maxwell Jacob Friedman and Richard Holliday)	July 6, 2019	Fusion	Cicero, Illinois	1	119	The Dynasty defeated Brian Pillman Jr. and Teddy Hart in a ladder match to win the championship. The episode aired on tape delay on July 13, 2019.	
5	The Von Erichs (Marshall Von Erich and Ross Von Erich)	November 2, 2019	Saturday Night SuperFight	Cicero, Illinois	1	438	This was a Texas Tornado match.	
6	Los Parks (El Hijo de L.A. Park and L.A. Park)	January 13, 2021	Fusion	Orlando, Florida	1	297	This was a Texas Tornado match, where Tom Lawlor served as the special guest referee.	
7	5150 (Danny Rivera and Slice Boogie)	November 6, 2021	War Chamber	Philadelphia, Pennsylvania	1	112	This was a Philadelphia street fight L.A. Park Jr. filled in for L.A. Park who was wrestling against Homicide later in the night.	
8	Hustle & Power (EJ Nduka and Calvin Tankman)	February 26, 2022	SuperFight	Charlotte, North Carolina	1	315	The episode aired on tape delay on March 31, 2022.	
9	Samoan SWAT Team (Juicy Finau and Lance Anoa'i)	January 7, 2023	Blood and Thunder	Philadelphia, Pennsylvania	1	182	The episode aired on tape delay on March 14, 2023.	
10	The Calling (Akira and Rickey Shane Page)	July 8, 2023	Never Say Never	Philadelphia, Pennsylvania	1	133		
11	The Second Gear Crew (Matthew Justice and 1 Called Manders)	November 18, 2023	Fightland	Philadelphia, Pennsylvania	1	103	This was a ladder match. During this reign, Masked Good Brother #3 defended the title once but was not recognized as champion.	
12	World Titan Federation (Tom Lawlor and Davey Boy Smith Jr.)	February 29, 2024	Intimidation Games	New York City, New York	1 (1, 2)	53		
—	Vacated	April 22, 2024	—	—	—	—	Titles vacated when World Titan Federation (Tom Lawlor and Davey Boy Smith Jr.) sustained injures in an attack by members of Contra Unit at War Chamber II.	
13	CozyMax (Satoshi Kojima and Shigeo Okumura)	May 11, 2024	Azteca Lucha	Cicero, Illinois	1	110	Defeated The Second Gear Crew (Matthew Justice and 1 Called Manders) to win the vacant championship.	
14	Contra Unit (Ikuro Kwon and Minoru Suzuki)	August 29, 2024	Summer of the Beasts	New York City, New York	1	98		
15	CozyMax (Satoshi Kojima and Shigeo Okumura)	December 5, 2024	Eric Bischoff's One Shot	New York City, New York	2	148		
16	Los Depredadores (Rugido and Magnus)	May 2, 2025	CMLL vs. MLW	Mexico City, Mexico	1	55		
17	The Skyscrapers (Donovan Dijak, Bishop Dyer, and Josh Bishop)	June 26, 2025	Summer of the Beasts	New York City, New York	1	317	Dijak and Dyer originally won the titles. On March 14, 2026 MLW Fusion taping, Josh Bishop was introduced as the newest member of The Skyscrapers, with the trio defending the titles under the Freebird Rule.	
18	The Good Brothers (Doc Gallows and Karl Anderson)	May 9, 2026	Fusion	Chattanooga, Tennessee	1	191+	Defeated Donovan Dijak and Bishop Dyer, who represented The Skyscrapers. This was a Tennessee Tornado match. Aired on tape delay on August 15, 2026.	

== Combined reigns ==
=== By tag team ===
As of November 16, 2026.

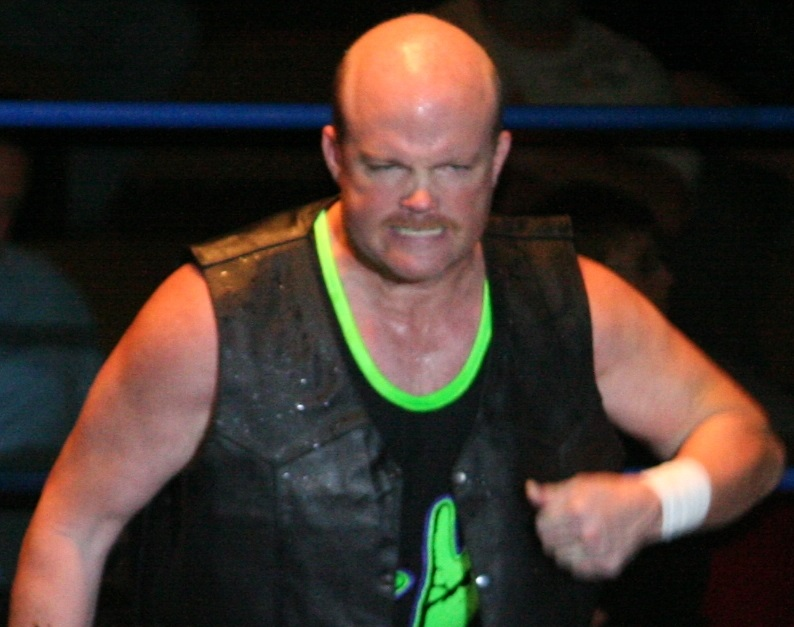
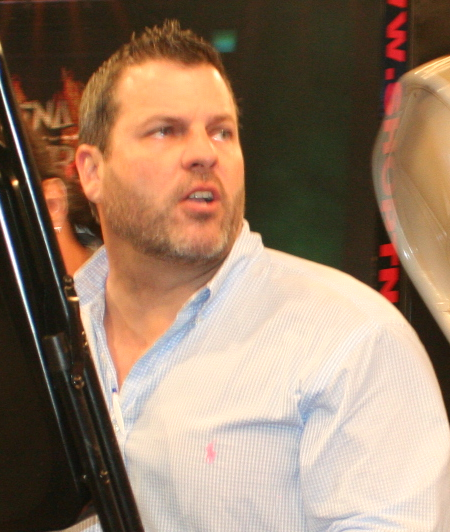
Inaugural champions C.W. Anderson and Simon Diamond of The Extreme Horsemen.
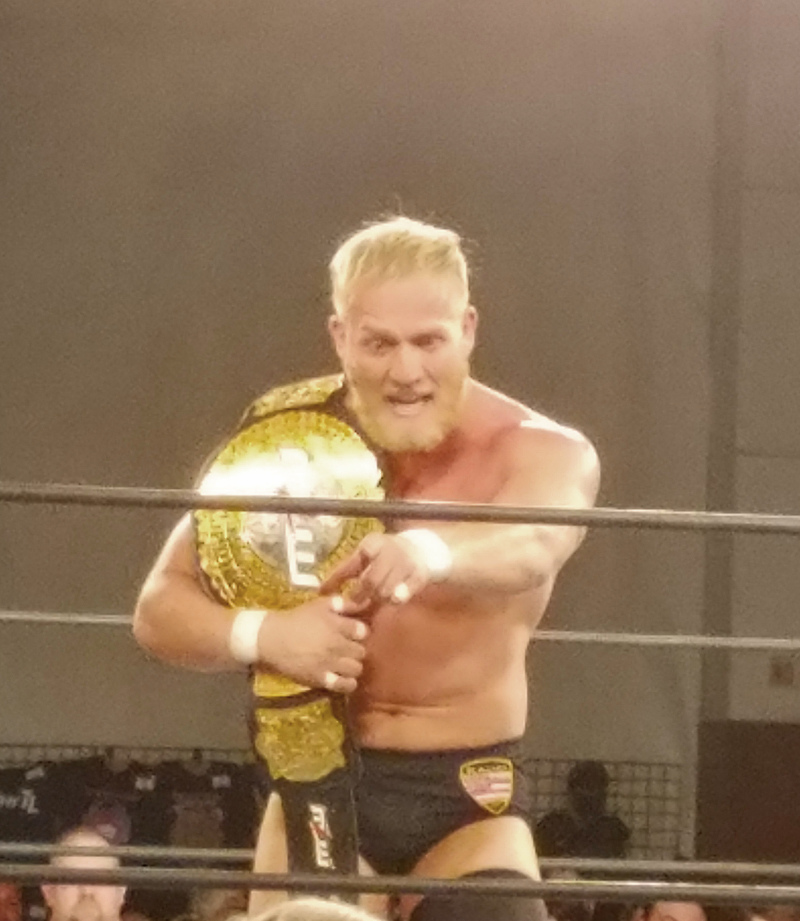
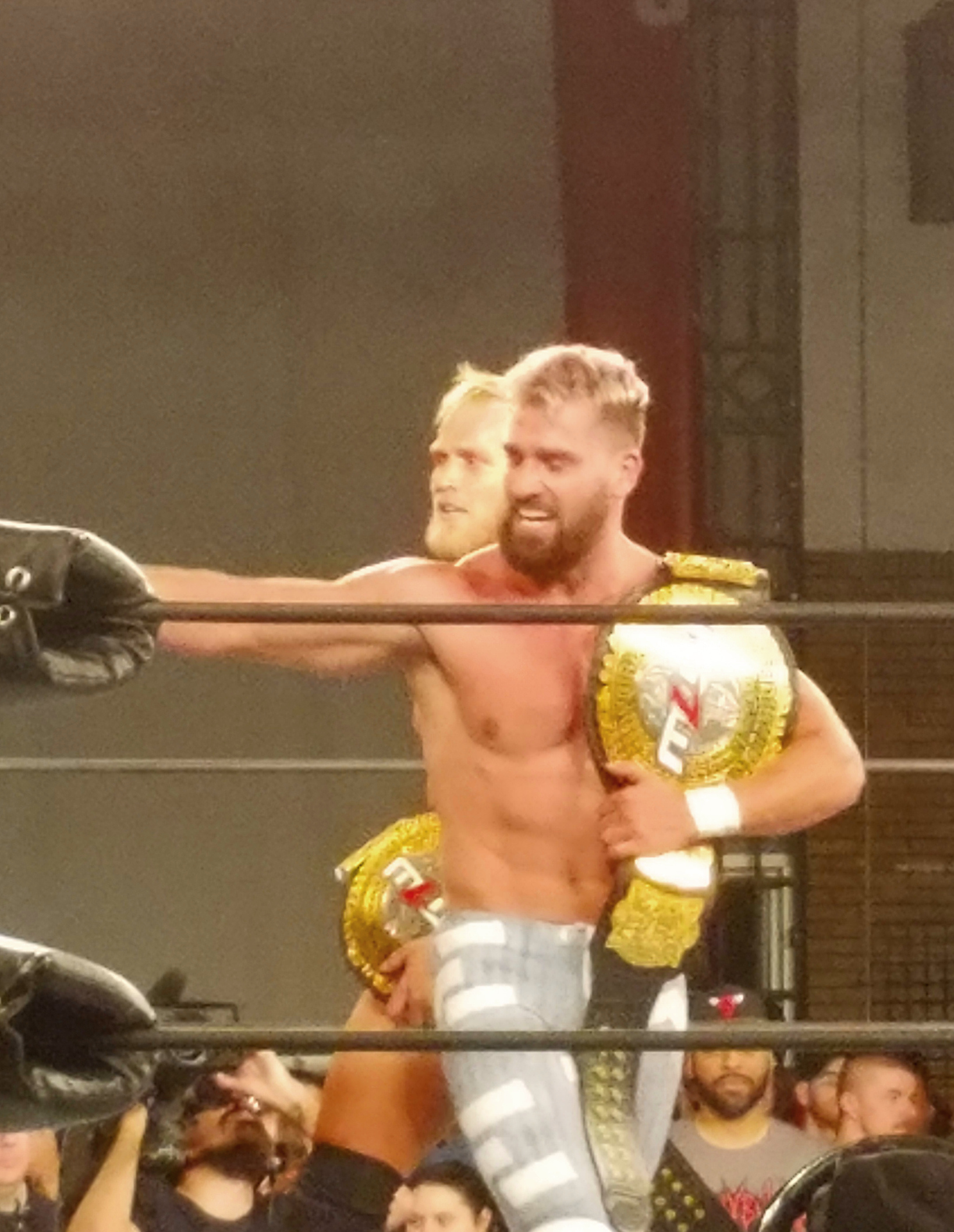
The longest reigning champions are The Von Erichs
(Marshall Von Erich(left) and Ross Von Erich(right))

†	Indicates the current champion

Rank	Team	No. of reigns	Combined days
1	The Von Erichs (Marshall Von Erich and Ross Von Erich)	1	438
2	The Skyscrapers (Donovan Dijak, Bishop Dyer, and Josh Bishop)	1	317
3	Hustle & Power (EJ Nduka and Calvin Tankman)	1	315
4	Los Parks (El Hijo de L.A. Park and L.A. Park)	1	297
5	The Extreme Horsemen (C.W. Anderson and Simon Diamond)	1	277
6	CozyMax (Satoshi Kojima and Shigeo Okumura)	2	258
7	Lucha Brothers (Penta el 0M and Rey Fénix)	1	240
8	The Good Brothers † (Doc Gallows and Karl Anderson)	1	191+
9	Samoan SWAT Team (Juicy Finau and Lance Anoa'i)	1	182
10	The Hart Foundation (Teddy Hart, Davey Boy Smith Jr., and Brian Pillman Jr.)	1	154
11	The Calling (Akira and Rickey Shane Page)	1	133
12	The Dynasty (Maxwell Jacob Friedman and Richard Holliday)	1	119
13	5150 (Danny Rivera and Slice Boogie)	1	112
14	The Second Gear Crew (Matthew Justice and 1 Called Manders)	1	103
15	Contra Unit (Ikuro Kwon and Minoru Suzuki)	1	98
16	Los Depredadores (Rugido and Magnus)	1	55
17	World Titan Federation (Tom Lawlor and Davey Boy Smith Jr.)	1	53

=== By wrestler ===
Rank	Wrestler	No. of reigns	Combined days
1	Marshall Von Erich	1	438
1	Ross Von Erich	1	438
3	Bishop Dyer	1	317
3	Donovan Dijak	1	317
5	EJ Nduka	1	315
5	Calvin Tankman	1	315
7	El Hijo de L.A. Park	1	297
7	L.A. Park	1	297
9	C.W. Anderson	1	277
9	Simon Diamond	1	277
11	Satoshi Kojima	2	258
11	Shigeo Okumura	2	258
13	Penta el 0M	1	240
13	Rey Fénix	1	240
15	Davey Boy Smith Jr.	2	207
16	Doc Gallows	1	191+
16	Karl Anderson	1	191+
18	Juicy Finau	1	182
18	Lance Anoa'i	1	182
20	Teddy Hart	1	154
20	Brian Pillman Jr.	1	154
22	Akira	1	133
22	Rickey Shane Page	1	133
24	Maxwell Jacob Friedman	1	119
24	Richard Holliday	1	119
26	Danny Rivera	1	112
26	Slice Boogie	1	112
28	Matthew Justice	1	103
28	1 Called Manders	1	103
30	Ikuro Kwon	1	98
30	Minoru Suzuki	1	98
32	Josh Bishop	1	56
33	Rugido	1	55
33	Magnus	1	55
35	Tom Lawlor	1	53
