= Jungle Nest =

- Genre: Action comedy
- Directed by: Diego Suárez
- Starring: Santiago Magariños; Esteban Prol; Tupac Larriera; Giovanna Reynaud; Ivan Arango; Ming Chen
- Country of origin: Argentina
- Original language: Spanish
- No. of seasons: 1
- No. of episodes: 26

Production
- Running time: 22 Minutes
- Production company: Non Stop TV

Original release
- Network: Disney XD
- Release: 13 February 2016 – June 5, 2016

Related
- Peter Punk

Jungle Nest is an action comedy and adventure television series produced by Non Stop and Disney XD Latin America, being the second program of Disney XD in Argentina, after Peter Punk. It premiered on 13 February 2016, and ended on 5 June 5, 2016.

== Synopsis ==
A 17-year-old boy named Julián (Santiago Magariños) goes with his uncle Max (Esteban Prol) to spend the summer in his ecological hotel, located in the middle of the jungle and built in the treetops. The series develops around them and three other adventurers, who live multiple situations in the jungle.

== Cast ==
- Santiago Magariños as Julián
- Esteban Prol as Max
- Tupac Larriera as Oso
- Giovanna Reynaud as Gala
- Ivan Arango as Rocco
- Ming Chen as Mei Ling
- Valentín Villafañe as Markus Montalban
- César Bordón as Clodomiro Montalbán
