= John McDaniel (musician) =

American conductor, composer, pianist, and theatre producer

- Born: John William McDaniel; February 26, 1961 (age 65); St. Louis, Missouri, United States
- Education: Carnegie Mellon University
- Occupations: Composer, producer, musical director, conductor, and pianist
- Years active: 1992 – Present
- Known for: The Rosie O'Donnell Show
- Website: http://www.johnmcdaniel.com/

John William McDaniel (born February 26, 1961, St. Louis, Missouri, United States) is an American theatre producer, composer, conductor, and pianist. He is known as the lead composer and producer of the daytime television talk show The Rosie O'Donnell Show, for which he received six Daytime Emmy Award nominations, winning two.

McDaniel is also known for his collaborations with Patti LuPone, most notably her 1995 concert Patti LuPone: Live!, which debuted on Broadway after a Los Angeles engagement. He won a Grammy Award for producing the cast album of Annie Get Your Gun (1999).

== Biography ==
McDaniel was born John William McDaniel on February 26, 1961, in St. Louis, Missouri. He first studied piano with his mother, Jane, and graduated from Kirkwood High School (St. Louis), then earned a BFA degree in Drama from Carnegie Mellon University.

== Career ==
=== 1990s ===
McDaniel conducted a Los Angeles production of Chicago: The Musical in 1992, for which he earned a Los Angeles Drama Critics Circle Award. In 1993, McDaniel conducted the orchestra for a concert presentation of Stephen Sondheim's Company. The event, which reunited the entire original Broadway cast, took place on April 11, 1993, at Lincoln Center Theater's Vivian Beaumont Theater. Prior to this, the production ran at the Terrace Theatre in Long Beach, California, in January 1993.

He was offered the job of musical director and conductor for the successful revival of Grease: The Musical, which opened at the Eugene O'Neill Theatre on March 11, 1994. This revival concluded its three-year run on January 25, 1998. With Patti LuPone, he co-created the concert Patti LuPone: Live!, which ran in Los Angeles in April/May 1993, and played on Broadway as Patti LuPone on Broadway from October to November 1995. He worked as music director on the Sherman Brothers musical Busker Alley starring Tommy Tune from 1994 to 1995.

In 1996, McDaniel became producer and composer on Rosie O'Donnell's talk show, The Rosie O'Donnell Show. The series ran until May 22, 2002, garnering McDaniel two Daytime Emmy Awards out of six nominations. On the 1996 television series The Nanny, the talk show was featured in the episode "The Rosie Show." McDaniel appears in scenes of The Rosie O'Donnell Show used in the episode. McDaniel and the rest of the house band were dubbed "The McDLT's."

On March 4, 1999, a revival of Irving Berlin's Annie Get Your Gun opened at the Marquis Theatre, with McDaniel as vocal arranger and supervising musical director, which ran until September 2001.

=== 2000s ===
In 2000, McDaniel received a Board of Directors' Award from the Manhattan Association of Cabarets & Clubs. Subsequent Broadway credits include Taboo in 2003 and Brooklyn in 2004. McDaniel later served as musical director and orchestrator for the Frank Wildhorn, Don Black and Ivan Menchell musical adaptation of Bonnie & Clyde, in a Roundabout Theatre Company reading in February 2009.

=== 2010s and beyond ===
McDaniel collaborated with Tyne Daly for a "much-raved-about gig at Feinstein's at Loews Regency" in January 2010; he subsequently worked with Daly and Jerry Mitchell on a workshop of the dance show, Queen of the Stardust Ballroom. In November 2010, McDaniel worked with Brooke Shields on her American Songbook Project live auction item, An Evening with Brooke Shields and John McDaniel, which consisted of "a private cabaret performance that will take place in an apartment overlooking Lincoln Center for up to 30 friends of the highest bidder."

McDaniel served as the musical director and conductor of the on-stage orchestra for the 2011 Broadway musical Catch Me If You Can, which is composed by Marc Shaiman with lyrics by Shaiman and Scott Wittman. The musical opened at the Neil Simon Theatre on April 10, 2011.

In 2023, he orchestrated and conducted Carol Burnett's 90th Birthday celebration on NBC, working with Bernadette Peters, Billy Porter, Jane Lynch, Kristin Chenoweth, Darren Criss & Katy Perry.

McDaniel is the composer on a Broadway bound musical version of Huxley's "Brave New World", with lyrics by Bill Russell and a book by Ben Andron.

McDaniel is also composing the work-in-progress musical It's a Wonderful Life. This is an adaptation of the 1946 film of the same name, which deals with George Bailey, a man whose imminent suicide on Christmas Eve brings about the intervention of his guardian angel, Clarence Odbody. Clarence shows George all the lives he has touched and the contributions he has made to his community. Said McDaniel in an interview:

I'm in the throes of writing a musical version of It's a Wonderful Life right now, working with Kathie Lee Gifford, who's writing the lyrics.

== Discography ==
=== Solo albums ===
Title	Year
John McDaniel at the Piano: Broadway	2000
John McDaniel at the Piano: Christmas	2001
John McDaniel at the Piano: Compositions	2002
John McDaniel: Live at Joe's Pub	2003

=== Cast albums ===
Title	Year
Annie Get Your Gun	1999
Brooklyn: The Musical	2001
Taboo (Original Broadway Cast Recording)	2004
Happy Days – A New Musical	2007

=== Compilation albums ===
Title	Year
Patti LuPone: Live!	1993
The Maury Yeston Songbook	2003

== Awards and nominations ==
Wins

- 1992 Los Angeles Drama Critics Circle Award, Best Musical Direction, Chicago
- 1999 Grammy Award, Best Musical Show Album, Annie Get Your Gun
- 2001 Daytime Emmy Award, Outstanding Talk Show, The Rosie O'Donnell Show
- 2002 Daytime Emmy Award, Outstanding Talk Show, The Rosie O'Donnell Show

Nominations

- 1998 Daytime Emmy Award, Outstanding Achievement in Music Direction and Composition, The Rosie O'Donnell Show
- 2001 Daytime Emmy Award, Outstanding Achievement in Music Direction and Composition, The Rosie O'Donnell Show
- 2002 Daytime Emmy Award, Outstanding Achievement in Music Direction and Composition, The Rosie O'Donnell Show

== Personal life ==
McDaniel, who is openly gay, having lived in NYC for 25 years, currently resides in south Florida with his partner, Charlie, and their dog: Clarence.
