= Mother's Day Is Cancelled =

- Amazon Prime Video release poster
- Directed by: Javier Colinas
- Written by: Adriana Pelusi; Ricardo Avilés; El Huevo Charlie Barrientos
- Produced by: Javier Colinas; Roberto Fiesco; Mario Guerrero; Sandro Halphen; Eckehardt Von Damm
- Starring: Gala Montes; Michel Duval; Anette Michel; Leticia Huijara; Alejandro Camacho
- Release date: May 5, 2023
- Running time: 90 minutes
- Country: Mexico
- Language: Spanish

Mother's Day Is Cancelled (Spanish: ¡Hasta la madre del Día de las Madres!, lit. 'Even the mother of Mother's Day!' which is interpreted as lit. 'Sick of Mother's Day!') is a 2023 Mexican comedy film directed by Javier Colinas and written by Adriana Pelusi, Ricardo Avilés & El Huevo Charlie Barrientos. It features Gala Montes, Michel Duval, Anette Michel, Leticia Huijara and Alejandro Camacho. It had its world premiere on May 5, 2023, on Amazon Prime Video.

== Synopsis ==
When the two families of a couple come together to celebrate Mother's Day and a family secret emerges, the celebration could turn into an argument that erupts in awkward, but at the same time liberating and just plain chaotic sincerity.

== Cast ==
The cast includes:

- Gala Montes as Laidia
- Michel Duval as Manuel
- Anette Michel as Esmeralda
- Leticia Huijara as Rosa
- Axel Trujillo as Emilio
- Alejandro Camacho as Francisco
- Kenneth Lavill as Lalo
- Giovanna Reynaud as Sofía
- Diego Meléndez as Pablo
- Ignacio Guadalupe as Jaime
