= Maxwell Jacob Friedman =

American professional wrestler (born 1996)

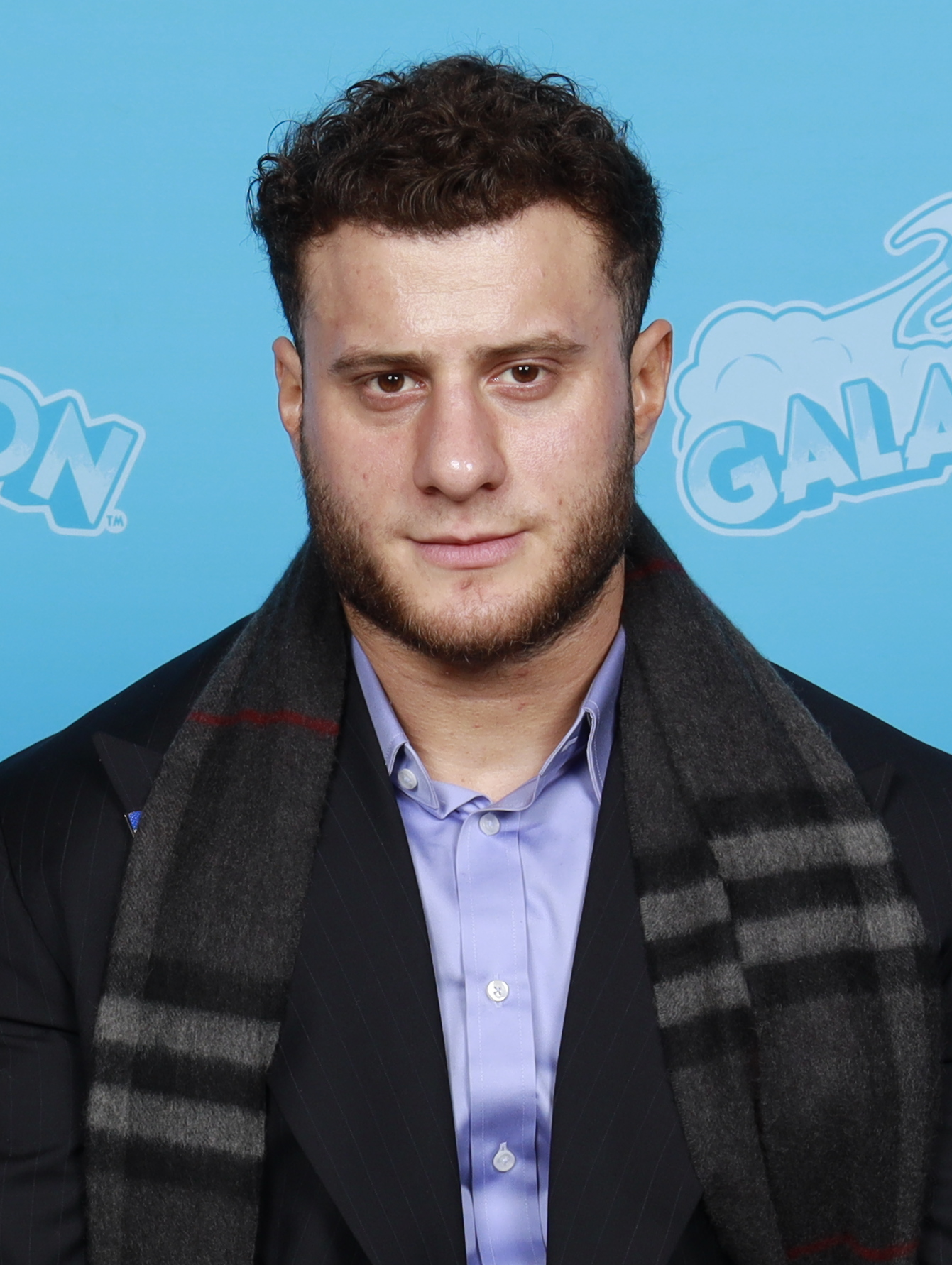
- MJF in 2024

Personal information
- Born: Maxwell Tyler Friedman; March 15, 1996 (age 30) Plainview, Long Island, New York, U.S.
- Spouse: Alicia Atout (m. 2025)
- Website: maxwelljacobfriedman.com

Professional wrestling career
- Ring name(s): Maxwell Jacob Friedman; MJF; Maxwell Jacob Feinstein; Pete Lightning; Sandy Bunker
- Billed height: 5 ft 11 in (180 cm)
- Billed weight: 226 lb (103 kg)
- Billed from: Plainview, Long Island, New York
- Trained by: Brian Myers; Create A Pro Wrestling Academy; Pat Buck
- Debut: February 13, 2015

Maxwell Tyler Friedman (born March 15, 1996), better known by the ring name Maxwell Jacob Friedman or simply the initials MJF, is an American professional wrestler and actor. As a wrestler, he has been signed to All Elite Wrestling (AEW) since January 2019.

Friedman began his professional wrestling career on the independent circuit in 2015, and soon joined Combat Zone Wrestling (CZW), where he became a one-time CZW World Heavyweight Champion and a one-time CZW Wired Champion. He joined Major League Wrestling (MLW) in 2017, becoming the inaugural MLW World Middleweight Champion and won the MLW World Tag Team Championship once. Friedman signed with AEW in 2019 and has since become a three-time AEW World Champion, with his first reign being the longest reign for the title at 406 days, a one-time AEW International Champion, and a record six-time AEW Dynamite Diamond Ring winner. He also won the Casino Ladder Match and Casino Gauntlet match once each. With AEW's relationships with Ring of Honor (ROH) and Consejo Mundial de Lucha Libre (CMLL), Friedman won the ROH World Tag Team Championship and CMLL World Light Heavyweight Championship once each.He also headlined several AEW pay-per-view events, including AEW's major flagship annual event and biggest event ever, All In (2023) . He tops Pro Wrestling Illustrated's PWI 500 list of the top 500 wrestlers in the world in 2026.

Outside of wrestling, Friedman appeared in the comedies Happy Gilmore 2 and Violent Night 2.

== Early life ==
Maxwell Tyler Friedman was born into an Ashkenazi Jewish family in Plainview, New York, on March 15, 1996. At the age of five, he appeared on an episode of The Rosie O'Donnell Show that aired in 2001, singing "You Are My Sunshine" after his parents submitted a tape of him singing it in an operatic style while eating a pear. After a video of his performance resurfaced in 2019, it was referenced as part of a wrestling storyline. During his interview with Rosie O'Donnell, Friedman said he aspired to be an opera singer and a professional wrestler, and that Goldberg and The Rock were his favorite wrestlers.

Friedman grew up as a religious Jew, having had his Bar mitzvah in 2009. Friedman graduated in 2014 from Plainview – Old Bethpage John F. Kennedy High School where he was a member of the football team. He briefly attended Hartwick College in Oneonta, New York.

== Professional wrestling career ==
=== Early career (2015–2016) ===
Friedman was trained by Brian Myers and Pat Buck, and made his in-ring debut in their Create A Pro Wrestling Academy in Hicksville, New York, on February 15, 2015, at age 18. He also wrestled for Combat Zone Wrestling and Five Borough Wrestling during his debut year and went on to appear in numerous promotions across the northeastern independent wrestling circuit. In April 2015, WWE uploaded his entry for WWE Tough Enough to their YouTube channel. He also appeared as an onscreen security guard during Samoa Joe's entrance at NXT TakeOver: Brooklyn II in August 2016 during which he was pushed by Joe.

=== Combat Zone Wrestling (2015–2018) ===
Friedman worked under the new ring name Pete Lightning in several CZW Dojo Wars events since 2015, usually in tag team matches with Hous Blazer and Penelope Ford. On the September 7, 2016 edition of CZW Dojo Wars, he returned to his previous ring name, Maxwell Jacob Friedman, and entered the Dramatic Destination Series tournament. On May 13, 2017, at CZW Sacrifices, Friedman defeated Johnny Yuma to win the CZW Wired Championship. He won his first title defense at CZW EVILution, defeating Trevor Lee. He successfully retained the title in further singles matches against Mike Del, John Silver, and Ace Romero. On October 14 at CZW The Wolf of Wrestling, Friedman lost the CZW Wired title to Joey Janela. Two months later at CZW Cage of Death 19, Friedman won the title back after defeating Janela in a rematch.

Friedman returned on February 10, 2018, at CZW Nineteen, where he won the 27-Man Battle Royal to become the new number one contender for the CZW World Heavyweight Championship. He also successfully defended the CZW Wired Championship against Alex Colon on that date. There he defeated Rickey Shane Page to win the CZW World Heavyweight Championship for the first time, and surrendered the CZW Wired Championship on the same night. He would forfeit the title in November 2018 and make his final appearance on CZW.

=== Major League Wrestling (2017–2020, 2025) ===
==== World Middleweight Champion (2017–2018) ====
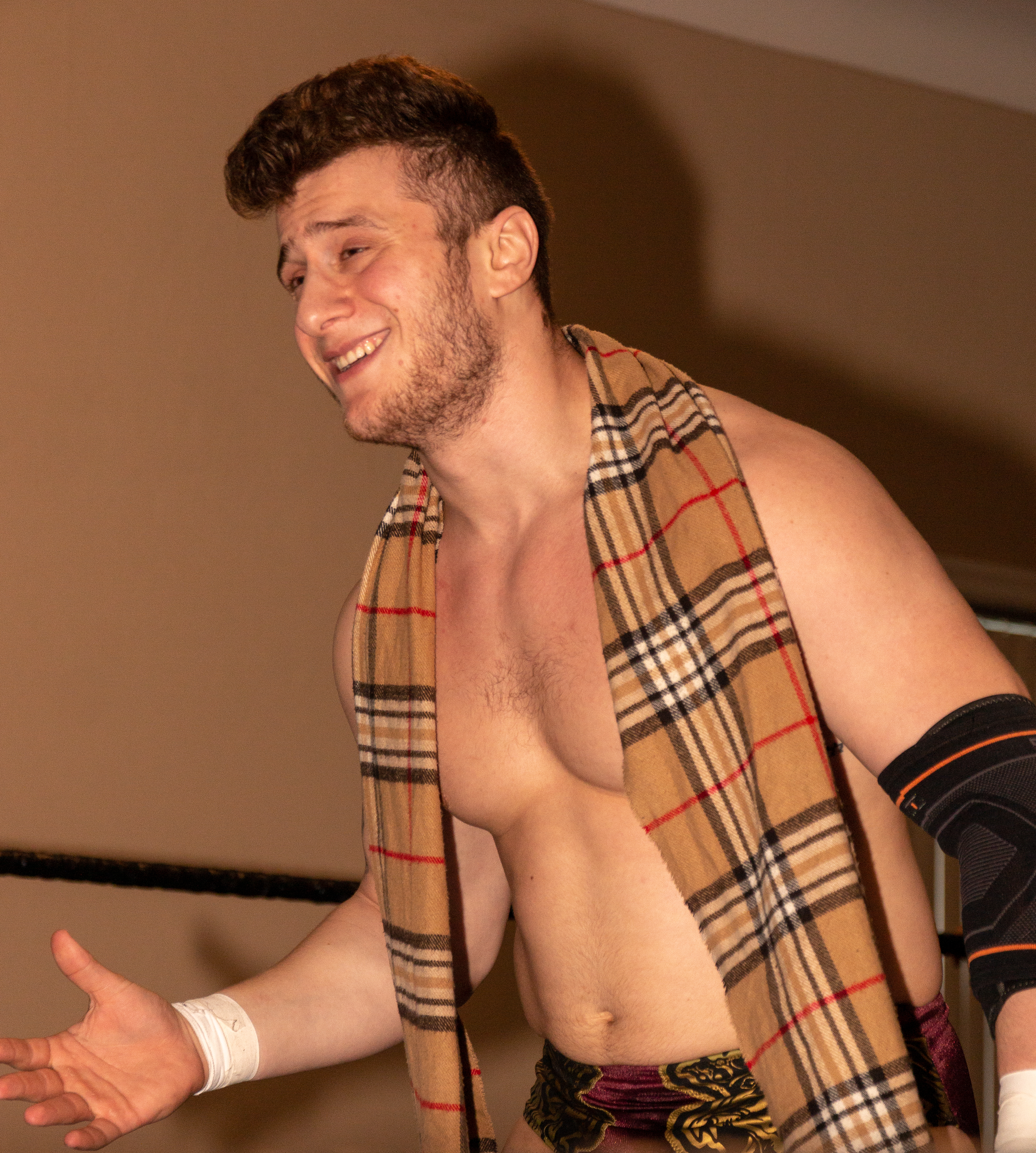
Friedman performing at an independent circuit show in November 2018

On September 5, 2017, it was reported that Friedman signed a contract with the reinstated Major League Wrestling (MLW) to appear at its reunion event One Shot to compete in a match against Jimmy Yuta, which Friedman won. Friedman then became a member of the MLW roster as he continued his winning streak against Joey Ryan at Never Say Never. MJF suffered his first loss in MLW against Brody King at Zero Hour on January 11, 2018. He then participated in a tournament for the vacant World Heavyweight Championship at Road To The World Championship, losing to the British wrestler Jimmy Havoc in the opening round. Friedman went on to defeat Lance Anoa'i at Spring Break. He made his Fusion debut on the May 11 episode by defeating Fred Yehi. He continued his success with an upset win over Montel Vontavious Porter at Intimidation Games.

On July 29, MJF defeated Joey Ryan to become the first-ever World Middleweight Champion at the Battle Riot special. Later that night, MJF participated in the namesake match as the No. 38 entrant and was eliminated by the eventual winner Tom Lawlor. On the August 10 episode of Fusion, MJF made his first title defense against Joey Janela in a falls count anywhere match, which he retained after Janela's on-screen girlfriend Aria Blake turned on Janela by hitting him in the head with a bottle. This led to Blake becoming MJF's valet. On the September 21 episode of Fusion, MJF and Blake defeated Joey Ryan and Taya Valkyrie in a mixed tag team match. MJF made his second title defense of the World Middleweight Championship on the November 9 episode of Fusion, where he successfully defended the title against Jason Cade and Jimmy Yuta in a three-way elimination match. On November 25, Friedman revealed that he had suffered a fractured elbow with a recovery time of 4 to 6 weeks. MLW later announced that the Middleweight title had been stripped from Friedman due to him not being cleared in time for his scheduled title defense at MLW's live Fusion December 14 episode.

==== The Dynasty (2019–2020) ====
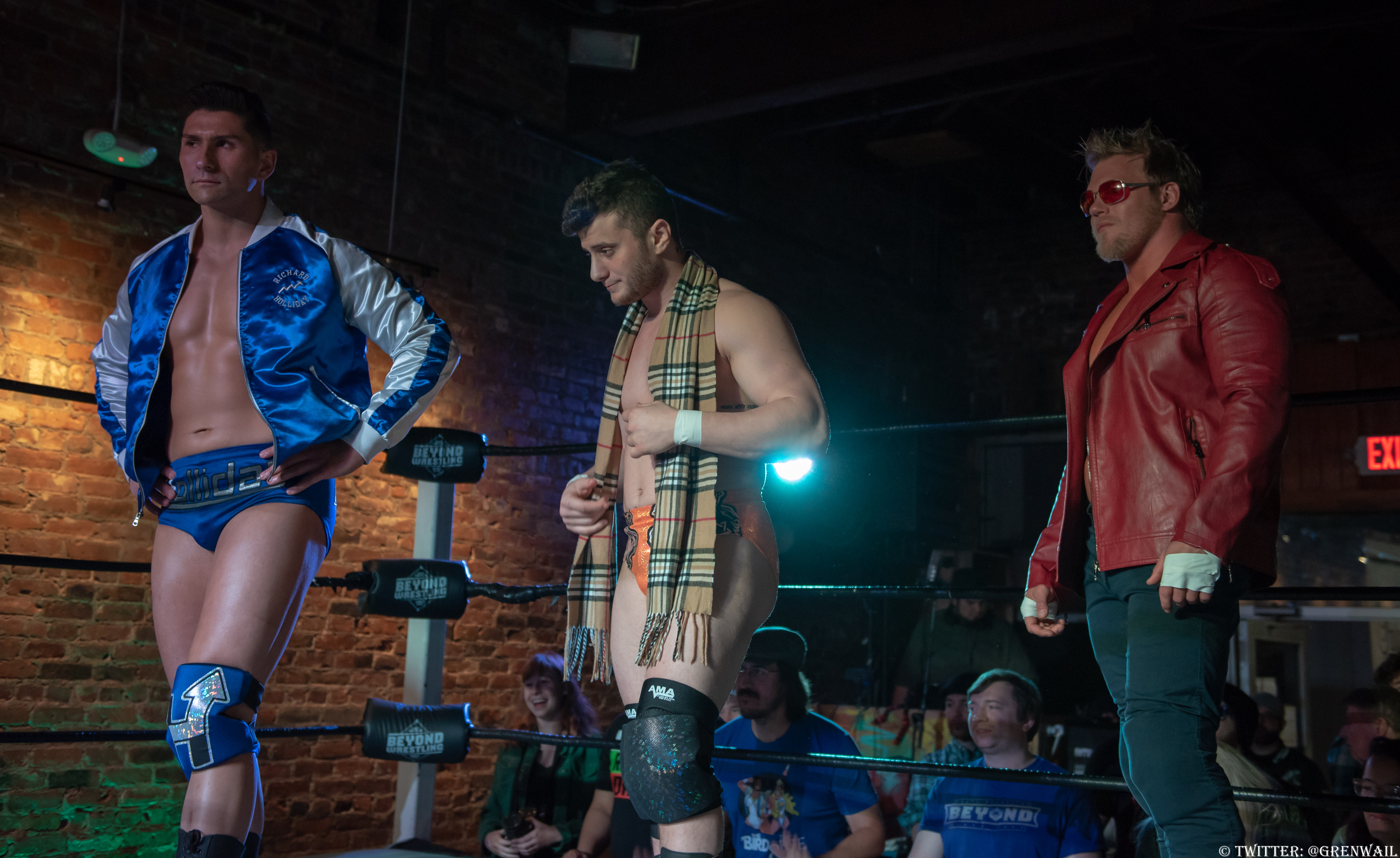
MJF alongside fellow members of the Dynasty Richard Holliday and Alexander Hammerstone in 2019

MJF returned from his injury on the February 16, 2019 episode of Fusion, where he unsuccessfully challenged the new champion Teddy Hart for the World Middleweight Championship. After the match, Richard Holliday joined MJF in attacking Hart. As a result, the duo formed a team called The Dynasty and began feuding with the Hart Foundation. They were shortly after joined by the newcomer Alexander Hammerstone. He later won the MLW World Tag Team Championship with Richard Holliday as part of the Dynasty.

He left the promotion in January 2020, but would wrestle Mance Warner in a loser leaves town, empty arena match in April 2020.

==== One night return (2025) ====
On June 26, 2025, at Summer of the Beasts, MJF returned to MLW after five years, where he attacked Místico, who he had been feuding with in AEW and CMLL.

=== All Elite Wrestling (2019–present) ===
==== Undefeated streak (2019–2020) ====
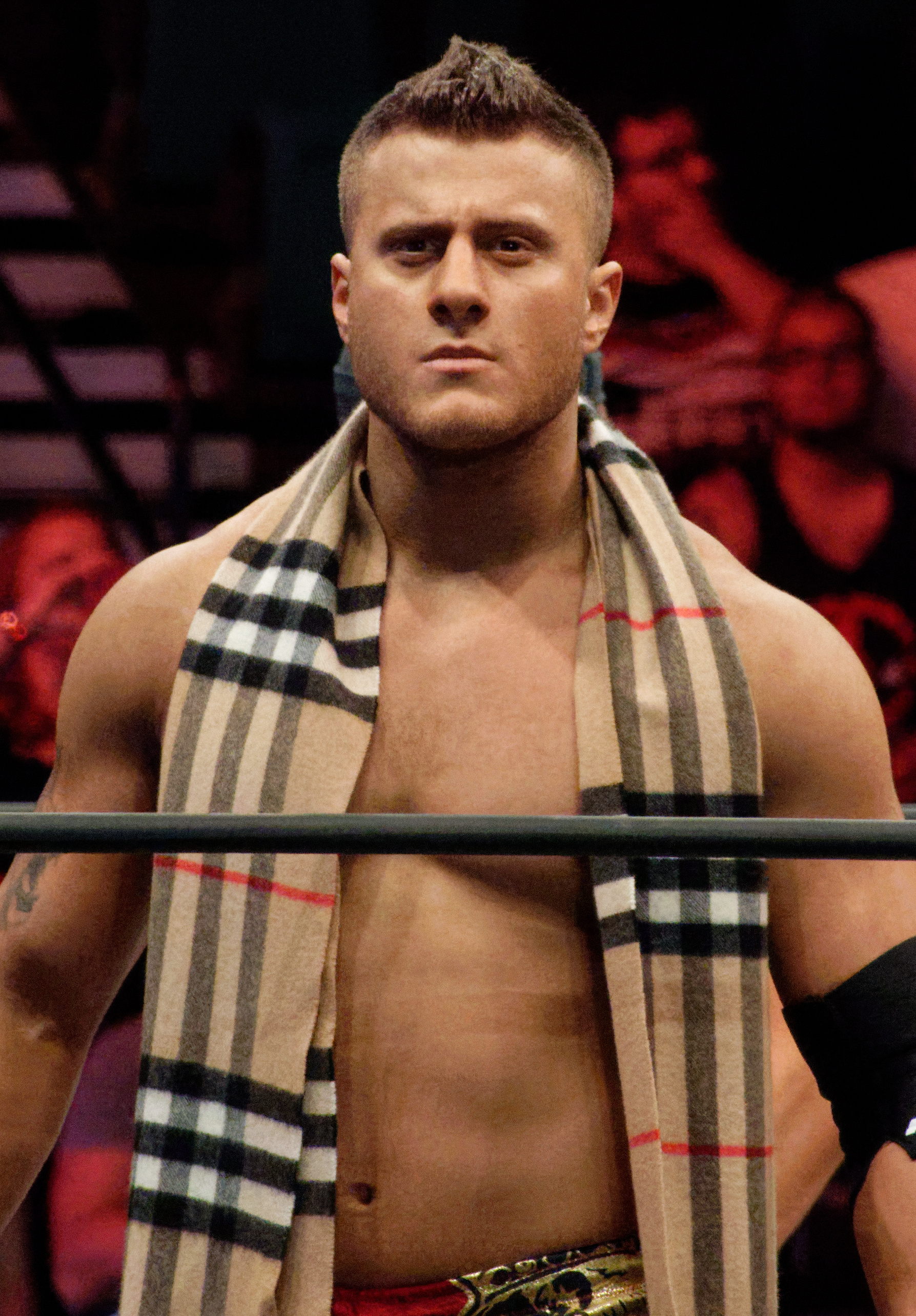
MJF during AEW's first-ever officially branded PPV, Double or Nothing, in 2019

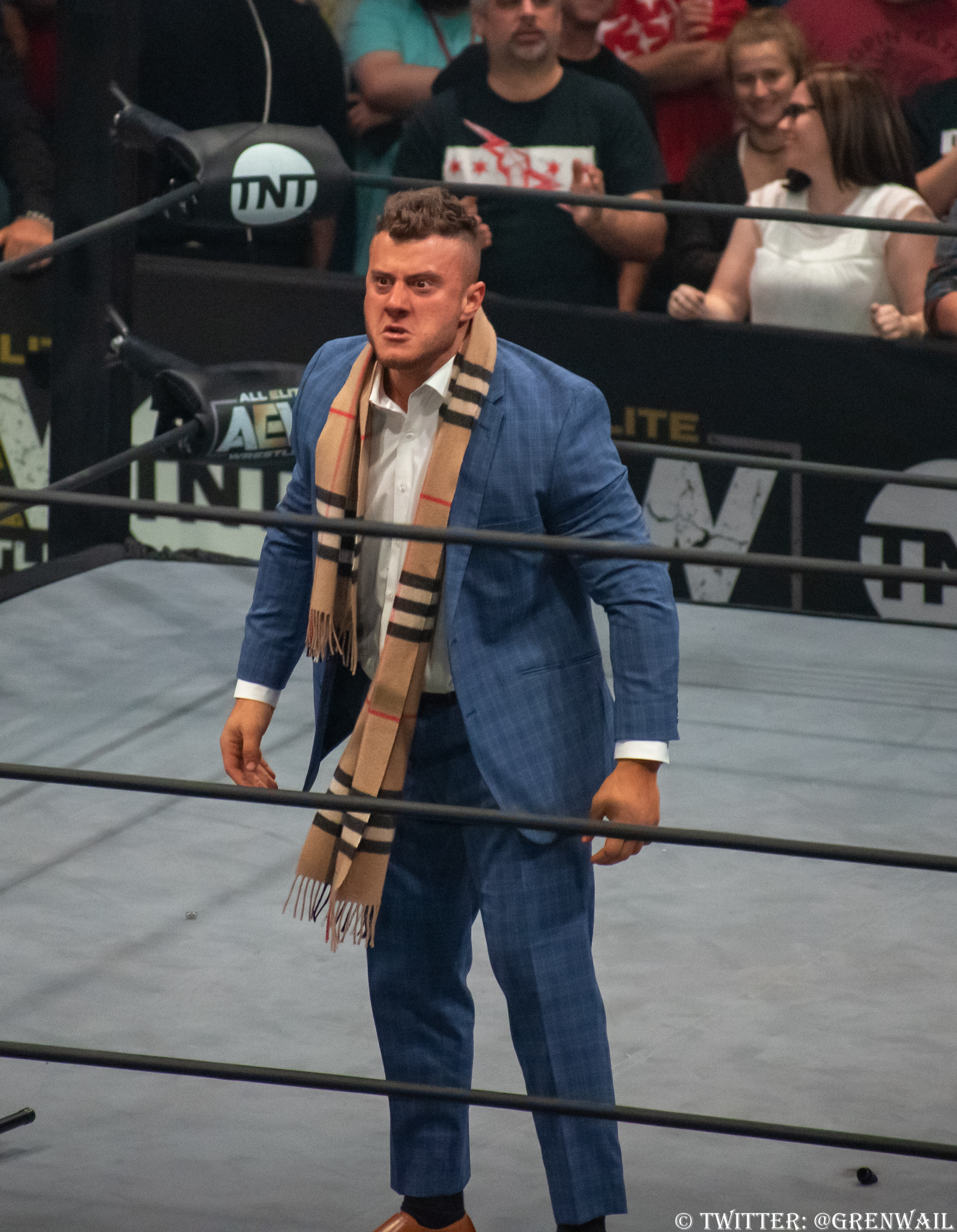
MJF during one of the very first episodes of AEW Dynamite in 2019

On January 7, 2019, it was announced that Friedman was signed to All Elite Wrestling (AEW) for a five-year deal. The year before, he had wrestled the opening maincard match of All In, an event seen as a precursor to the formation of the company, defeating Matt Cross. He debuted as a heel at Double or Nothing on May 25 as a part of the pre-show Casino Battle Royale for an AEW World Championship opportunity. He lasted until the final two, before being eliminated by Adam Page. Friedman went on to compete in a four-way match against Page, Jimmy Havoc and Jungle Boy at Fyter Fest on June 29, which Page also won. The following month at Fight for the Fallen on July 13, he teamed with Shawn Spears and Sammy Guevara to defeat Havoc, Darby Allin, and Joey Janela in a six-man tag team match.

On the first episode of Dynamite on October 2, Friedman defeated Brandon Cutler by submission. The following week on Dynamite, Friedman intervened in the attack of his "best friend" Cody by Inner Circle, attacking Santana and Ortiz with a steel chair seemingly turning face. At Full Gear on November 9, he accompanied Cody in his AEW World Championship match against Chris Jericho. Cody lost the match after MJF threw in the towel when he was caught in the Liontamer and as a result, Cody was no longer allowed to challenge for the AEW World Championship again due to a pre-match stipulation. After the match, MJF turned heel on Cody by giving him a low blow and walked away. Shortly thereafter, MJF found a bodyguard in the debuting Wardlow. On the November 20 episode of Dynamite, MJF and Adam Page were the final two entrants in the inaugural Dynamite Dozen Battle Royale. The two met in a singles match on the Thanksgiving Eve special episode on November 27, which MJF won. Diamond Dallas Page (DDP) then awarded him the Dynamite Diamond Ring as a prize for defeating Page. On January 15, 2020, at Bash at the Beach, MJF teamed with The Butcher and The Blade to defeat DDP, Dustin Rhodes and Q. T. Marshall. MJF rekindled his rivalry with Cody, and laid down three stipulations that Cody must follow to gain a match against him at Revolution on February 29 which included not touching MJF till the match happened, facing Wardlow in a steel cage match and receiving ten lashes by MJF on live TV. On the February 5 episode of Dynamite, Cody took the ten lashes from MJF, including one from Wardlow. Cody then went on to beat Wardlow in the first steel cage match in AEW's history on the February 19 episode of Dynamite to make the match against MJF at Revolution official. At Revolution, MJF defeated Cody by pinfall after hitting him on the face with the Dynamite Diamond Ring. MJF then entered a feud with Jungle Boy, defeating him at Double or Nothing on May 23 with a roll-up. On the May 27 episode of Dynamite, MJF unsuccessfully competed in a battle royal to face Cody for the AEW TNT Championship, being eliminated by Jungle Boy. At Fyter Fest on July 29, MJF and Wardlow were defeated by Jungle Boy and Luchasaurus. MJF then moved on to a feud with Jon Moxley, campaigning against Moxley's championship reign and decreed that fans deserved a better champion. The two faced each other at All Out on September 5, where MJF was defeated, marking his first loss in a singles match.

==== The Inner Circle (2020–2021) ====
On the October 28 episode of Dynamite, Chris Jericho and MJF agreed to wrestle each other at Full Gear on November 7 during a confrontational "Town Hall Meeting" with Eric Bischoff. Should MJF win, he would join Jericho's Inner Circle. The previous week, Jericho and MJF had participated in "Le Dinner Debonair", a meeting over a steak dinner during which Jericho and MJF performed a modified rendition of "Me and My Shadow". Journalist Wesley Morris later named the performance one of the "Best Performances of 2020" in an article published by The New York Times. At Full Gear, MJF, along with Wardlow, became members of The Inner Circle after he pinned Jericho. On the November 11 episode of Dynamite, MJF appeared for the first time as a member of The Inner Circle, where he gave a speech talking the struggles he overcame to get this far in wrestling, and then brought out a surprise birthday party for Jericho, the group's leader, which involved free tickets to Las Vegas and leading the crowd in a rousing rendition of "Happy Birthday". On December 2, at Winter Is Coming, MJF once again became a contender for a Dynamite Diamond Ring after he and Orange Cassidy were the final two entrants in the second Dynamite Dozen Battle Royale. On the December 9 episode of Dynamite, MJF won his second Diamond Ring after pinning Cassidy.

On the January 20, 2021 episode of Dynamite, a tag team battle royal was announced for Beach Break, with the winners getting an AEW World Tag Team Championship match against The Young Bucks (Matt Jackson and Nick Jackson) at Revolution on March 7. The Young Bucks also participated and had they won, they could have chosen their opponents. Jericho last eliminated Dante Martin of Top Flight to win the battle royal, earning himself and MJF a title match at Revolution. On the February 10 episode of Dynamite, following weeks of growing tension between MJF and Guevara, Guevara attacked MJF following a backstage confrontation, which gave MJF a kayfabe rib injury. Later on in the episode, following MJF and Jericho's victory against The Acclaimed (Anthony Bowens and Max Caster) in a tag team match, Guevara announced his departure from The Inner Circle. In the lead-up to their match at Revolution, MJF and Jericho attacked The Young Bucks' father, Papa Buck, and bloodied him backstage, vowing to take the titles off them. At Revolution, however, MJF and Jericho were defeated by The Young Bucks.

==== The Pinnacle (2021–2022) ====
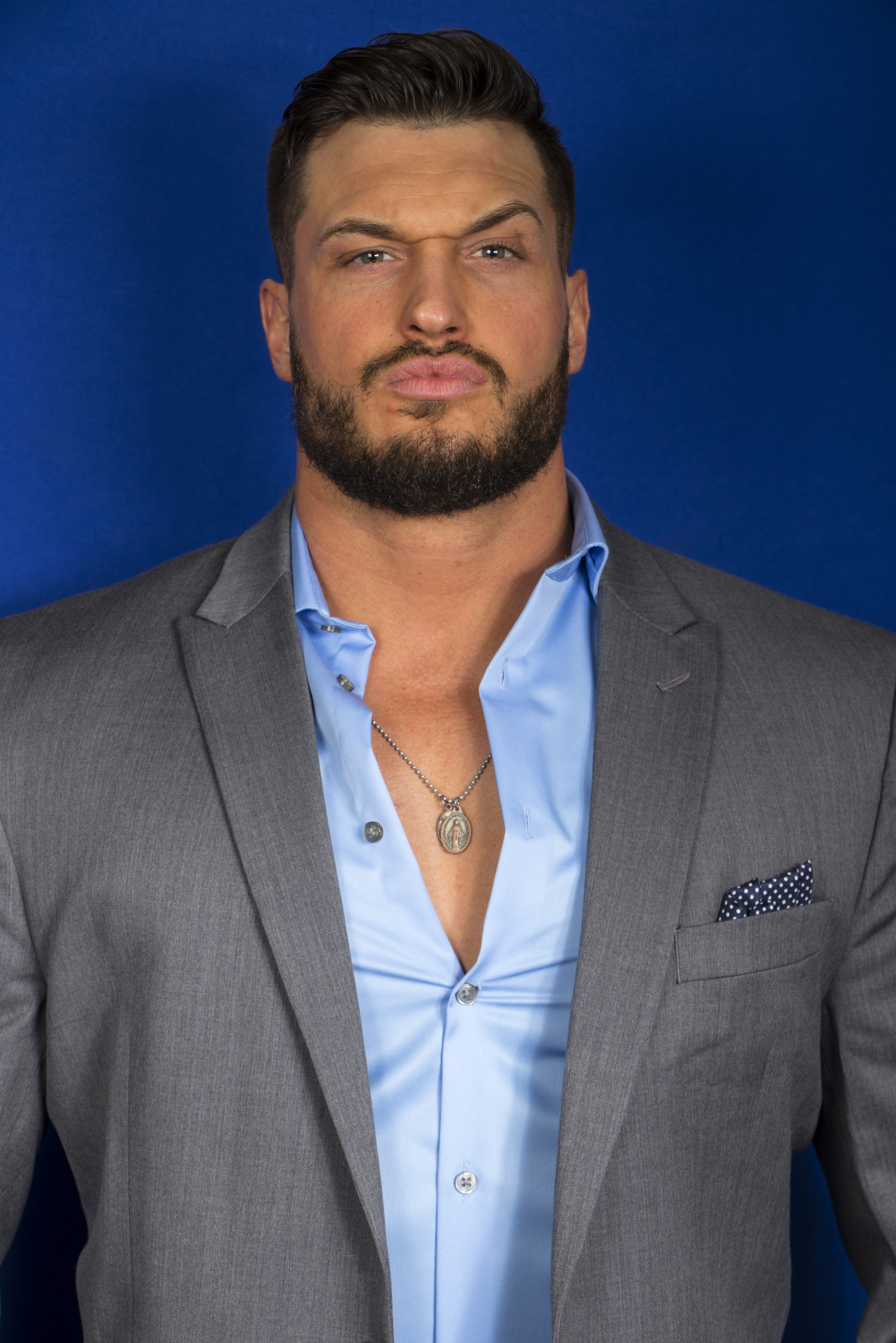
Throughout his early tenure in AEW, MJF was flanked by his bodyguard Wardlow (pictured)

On the March 10 episode of Dynamite, MJF was kicked out of The Inner Circle after it was revealed that he was secretly planning to perform a coup of the group. However, he then revealed that he had been building his own group with Wardlow, Shawn Spears, Tully Blanchard and FTR (Cash Wheeler and Dax Harwood), who appeared and violently attacked The Inner Circle. The stable would come to be known as The Pinnacle. At Blood and Guts on May 5, The Pinnacle defeated The Inner Circle in the inaugural Blood and Guts match. At Double or Nothing on May 30, The Pinnacle lost to The Inner Circle in a Stadium Stampede match. At All Out on September 5, MJF faced once again Jericho, with Jericho's career on the line. After a false victory for MJF, in which referee Aubrey Edwards counted the pin for MJF but did not see Jericho's foot placed on the rope, the match was restarted and Jericho forced MJF to submit to the "Walls of Jericho", losing for the first time against Jericho.

On the November 17 episode of Dynamite, MJF began a feud with CM Punk, after Punk interrupted his promo. On the February 2, 2022 episode of Dynamite, MJF became the first person to defeat Punk in AEW and also the first person to defeat him in a televised match since 2014. During the match, which was held in Punk's hometown of Chicago, Illinois, MJF scored a pinfall over Punk after Wardlow provided a ringside distraction and handed MJF his Dynamite Diamond Ring, which he then hit Punk with. On March 6 at Revolution, Wardlow, who began developing tension with MJF in December 2021, turned on MJF and helped Punk defeat him in a Dog Collar match by handing Punk the Dynamite Diamond Ring, which Punk then struck MJF with. On the May 18 episode of Dynamite, Wardlow, as part of a set of contract stipulations which would make him able to wrestle MJF, was lashed 10 times by MJF. The following week on Dynamite, Wardlow completed the final stipulation which guaranteed him a match with MJF at the upcoming Double or Nothing on May 29 by defeating Shawn Spears in steel cage match, with MJF serving as the special referee and being unsuccessful in his effort to cost Wardlow the match after Spears accidentally knocked him out; should Wardlow win, he would be officially released from his contract with MJF, but would be banned from obtaining a new AEW contract and be required to remain under MJF's employment should he lose. At Double or Nothing, MJF lost to Wardlow after ten powerbombs, MJF's first clean loss in singles action in AEW.

During the Double or Nothing weekend of May, MJF legitimately no-showed a fan fest. This came after months of rumors about the backstage tension between MJF and AEW owner Tony Khan about MJF's contract and payment he felt he should have, as well as doing an interview with Ariel Helwani without telling management. On the June 1 episode of Dynamite, MJF cut a worked shoot promo about not being respected by the fans and Khan. The segment ended with MJF demanding to be fired by Khan, calling Khan a "fucking mark", his microphone being cut off, quickly fading to commercial, and the commentators not referencing the situation after the break. The next day, his profile was removed from AEW's website and his merchandise was pulled on AEW's merchandise site as part of the storyline.

==== Longest-reigning AEW World Champion (2022–2023) ====
MJF made his return to AEW programming at All Out on September 4. Wearing a mask, he won the Casino Ladder match as the "joker" entrant with the help of Stokely Hathaway, securing himself a future shot for the AEW World Championship. He was revealed to be the person behind the mask at the end of the event, when he came out and stared down the newly crowned AEW World Champion CM Punk on the entrance stage. On the September 14 episode of Dynamite, MJF introduced his faction, The Firm, led by Stokely Hathaway. This new faction was considered as MJF's "Support System" and when they were not supporting MJF, all of the members in The Firm would do their own thing. However, on the October 26 episode of Dynamite, MJF was attacked by The Firm, after he had fired Hathaway for disobeying his orders not to attack AEW World Champion Jon Moxley because he wanted Moxley at 100% for their title match at Full Gear on November 19. At Full Gear, MJF defeated Moxley after using William Regal's signature brass knuckles. Regal slid them into the ring for MJF, helping to make him the youngest AEW World Champion in the history of the company. On the November 30 episode of Dynamite, MJF unveiled his own custom version, which he dubbed Triple-B, the "Big Burberry Belt". It features the exact same design as the standard belt; however, the leather strap is brown and fashioned in Burberry's trademark check pattern to match MJF's signature Burberry scarf. Later in the segment, MJF turned on Regal by attacking him, causing him to be taken to a nearby hospital thus ending their partnership.

On December 14 at Winter Is Coming, MJF successfully defended the AEW World Championship against Ricky Starks and won the Dynamite Diamond Ring for the fourth time. On March 5, 2023, at Revolution, MJF defeated Bryan Danielson in the overtime of their sixty-minute Iron Man match, which had ended in a tie. The match was met with critical acclaim, and received a 5.75 star rating from Dave Meltzer, making it the first five star match in MJF's career. On May 28 at Double or Nothing, MJF defended the AEW World Championship against Sammy Guevara, "Jungle Boy" Jack Perry and Darby Allin, who MJF pinned, in a four-way match. In June, MJF started to feud with Adam Cole, who he faced on the June 14 episode of Dynamite. The match ended in a 30-minute time-limit draw. At Forbidden Door on June 25, MJF successfully defended the AEW World Championship against Hiroshi Tanahashi. On the July 1 episode of AEW Collision, MJF successfully defended the AEW World Championship against Ethan Page.

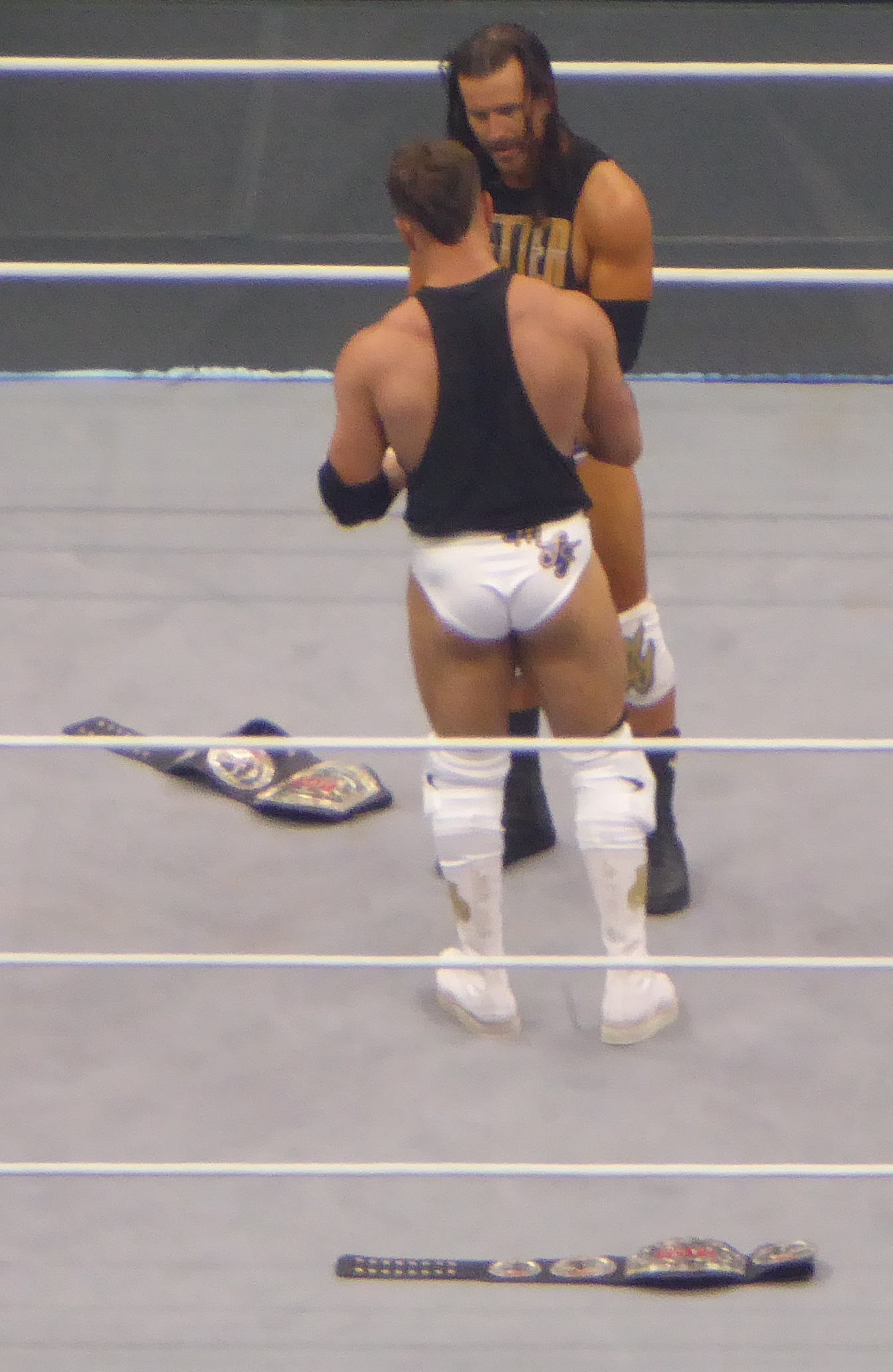
MJF (front) and Adam Cole (back) at All In in August 2023.

On the July 5 episode of Dynamite, MJF and Adam Cole were teamed together to participate in a tournament to receive an AEW World Tag Team Championship match on the July 29, 2023 episode of Collision. The two men would form a strong friendship and bond in various matches, segments, and skits over the next few weeks and MJF would show signs of a face turn. They won the tournament, defeating The Jericho Appreciation Society (Daniel Garcia and Sammy Guevara) in the finals. However, they would lose their title match to FTR. After the match, MJF in frustration would tease hitting Adam Cole with the AEW World Championship but eventually tossed the championship aside and embraced Cole in a hug, turning face for the first time in AEW and in his entire career. Despite the loss, MJF would grant Cole his rematch in the main event of All In on August 27 while also challenging Aussie Open to a match for the ROH World Tag Team Championship on All In: Zero Hour. At All In, MJF would both successfully defend the AEW World Championship against Cole and win the ROH World Tag Team Championship with Cole, making MJF a double champion. At All Out on September 3, MJF and Cole successfully defended the ROH Tag Titles against The Dark Order; on his way to the back, MJF was pushed by ROH World Television Champion Samoa Joe, leading to a brawl. Joe would win an Eliminator tournament to earn a shot against MJF for the AEW World Championship at Grand Slam on September 20; before Joe's tournament final match against Roderick Strong on the September 13 episode of Dynamite, MJF cut a promo that referenced the infamous "Scott Steiner math" promo that Steiner cut against Joe before TNA Sacrifice. At Grand Slam, MJF successfully defended the AEW World Championship against Samoa Joe.

At WrestleDream on October 1, MJF successfully defended the ROH World Tag Team titles against The Righteous (Dutch and Vincent) in a handicap match after Cole suffered a legitimate broken ankle. On the October 25 episode of Dynamite, MJF successfully defended the Dynamite Diamond Ring for the fifth time against Juice Robinson. After the match, MJF was challenged by Kenny Omega to an AEW World Championship match on the October 28 edition of Collision which MJF accepted. On Collision, MJF successfully defended the title against Omega. On the November 8 episode of Dynamite, MJF successfully defended the AEW World Championship against Daniel Garcia. On October 30, it was announced that MJF and a mystery partner would defend the tag title against The Gunns (Austin Gunn and Colten Gunn) during the Full Gear Zero Hour pre-show on November 18. He was offered by Samoa Joe to be his partner in exchange for a future AEW World Championship match, but MJF declined until the November 17 episode of Rampage when he accepted after Joe saved him from a beat down. At Full Gear, MJF would both successfully defend the AEW World Championship against Jay White and the ROH Tag Titles with Joe against The Gunns, although MJF suffered a minor leg injury. On the following episode of Dynamite, MJF said he would defend the AEW World Championship against Joe that night, but Joe declined, opting to challenge MJF at the Worlds End pay-per-view on December 30 instead. On the December 27 episode of Dynamite: New Years Smash, MJF and Samoa Joe were scheduled to defend the ROH World Tag Team Championship against The Devil's Masked Men, but an apparently injured Samoa Joe was shown backstage, causing MJF to unsuccessfully defend the titles on his own. After being defeated by the Masked Men, MJF was attacked before being saved by Joe. However, it was revealed that Joe feigned the injury and had been working with the Devil to set MJF up, after which, Joe hit MJF with a steel chair and delivered a muscle buster. At Worlds End, MJF lost the AEW World Championship to Samoa Joe, ending his record-setting reign at 406 days. After the match, MJF was attacked by Roderick Strong, Matt Taven, Mike Bennett and Wardlow, who revealed themselves as The Devil's Masked Men, with Adam Cole revealing himself as the Devil. After the event, it was reported that MJF would be taking some time off due to injuries.

==== Championship reigns (2024–2026) ====
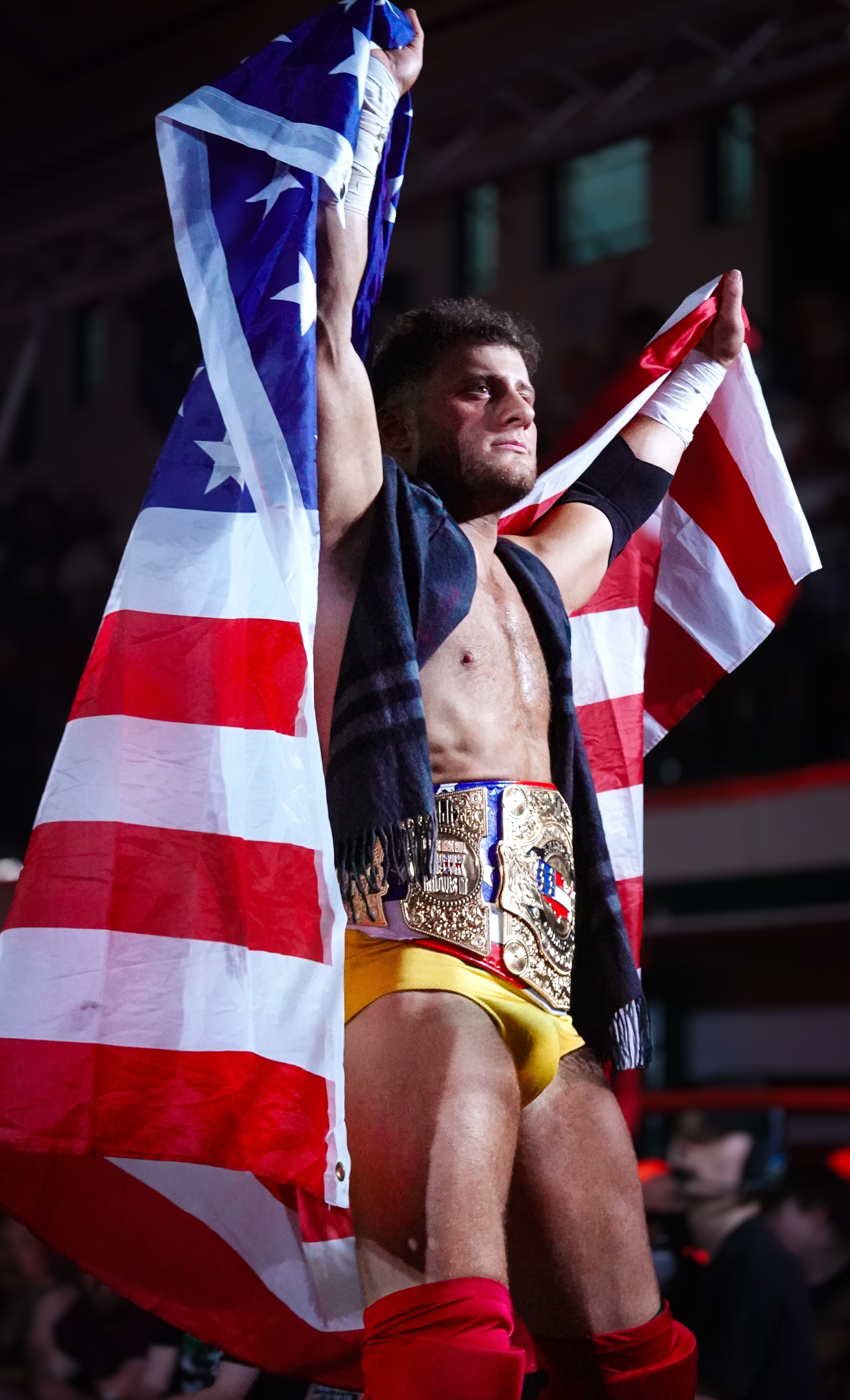
MJF as the AEW "American" Champion in August 2024

At Double or Nothing on May 26, 2024, MJF returned after a nearly five month hiatus by attacking Adam Cole and revealing that he had re-signed with AEW. After a mini feud with Rush, who MJF defeated on the June 19 episode of Dynamite, MJF turned heel by attacking Daniel Garcia at Beach Break special episode of Dynamite on July 3. At Dynamite 250 on July 17, MJF defeated Will Ospreay and won the AEW International Championship for the first time, in a match that finished only seconds short of the sixty-minute time limit. At Blood & Guts on July 24, MJF unofficially renamed the International Championship to the AEW American Championship with a brand new belt design that featured the colors of the American flag and would successfully defend the title in Consejo Mundial de Lucha Libre against Templario and Revolution Pro Wrestling against Michael Oku. On August 25 at All In, MJF lost the title back to Ospreay after interference from a returning Daniel Garcia, ending his reign at 39 days. On September 7 at All Out, MJF defeated Garcia. On October 12 at WrestleDream, MJF made his return after a brief hiatus and attempted to attack Garcia, but would be chased off by a returning Adam Cole, reigniting their feud. On November 23 at Full Gear, MJF defeated Cole's Undisputed Kingdom stablemate Roderick Strong. On December 28 at Worlds End, MJF successfully defended his Dynamite Diamond Ring against Cole, ending their feud. After defeating Cole, MJF began a feud with "Hangman" Adam Page, who MJF lost to at Revolution on March 9, 2025.

In March 2025, MJF started a storyline with The Hurt Syndicate where he would to attempt to join the group by attempting to impress Lashley and Benjamin by offering various gifts and assisting the duo in retaining their AEW World Tag Team Championships on April 6 at Dynasty against The Learning Tree (Big Bill and Bryan Keith), but would continue to be rejected. However, after viciously attacking Top Flight (Dante Martin and Darius Martin) on the May 7 episode of the Dynamite, MJF was accepted into the group the following week at Dynamite: Beach Break with an official contract signing being held the week after. MJF then began a feud with CMLL's Místico, leading to a match at Grand Slam Mexico on June 18, where MJF hit Místico with a low blow, causing a disqualification. After the match, MJF continued to attack Místico and unmasked him. On July 2 at Dynamite 300, MJF won a four-way match to earn the number two entrant in the Casino Gauntlet match at All In on July 12 and would go on to win the match at the event, earning a shot at the AEW World Championship at any time he wants. After All In: Texas, MJF was kicked out of The Hurt Syndicate on the August 6 episode of Dynamite.

At Forbidden Door on August 24, MJF was unsuccessful against "Hangman" Adam Page for the AEW World Championship. Afterwards, Tony Khan announced MJF must give one week of advance notice in executing his contract moving forward. After Forbidden Door, MJF continued to feud with Mark Briscoe, which ended at All Out on September 20, where MJF was defeated by Briscoe in a Tables 'n' Tacks match. After All Out, MJF went on hiatus in order to film Violent Night 2. MJF returned on December 17 at Dynamite: Holiday Bash, interrupting the AEW World Championship match contract signing between Adam Page, Samoa Joe, and Swerve Strickland, and invoked his Casino Gauntlet contract, turning it into a four-way bout set for Worlds End on December 27. At the event, MJF pinned Joe in the match to win his second AEW World Championship and reintroduced his custom "Big Burberry Belt" design.

On January 14, 2026 at Dynamite: Maximum Carnage, MJF successfully defended his title against Bandido. On February 14 at Grand Slam Australia, MJF successfully defended his title against Bandido's tag team partner Brody King. In March, MJF would successfully defend his title against Kevin Knight on the March 4 episode of Dynamite, and against Adam Page on March 15 at Revolution in a Texas Death match. On April 12 at Dynasty, MJF successfully defended his title against Kenny Omega and also became the first wrestler in 14 years to kick out of Omega's finisher, the One Winged Angel, though after a long count. Three nights later at Dynamite: Spring BreakThru, MJF lost his title to Darby Allin, ending his second reign at 109 days. He would regain it at Double or Nothing on May 24 in a Title vs. Hair match to begin his third reign, but lost it 45 days later to Kenny Omega in a Dynasty rematch at Dynamite: Beach Break on July 8 in what was Omega's last chance.

==== "One True Champion" (2026–present) ====
At Grand Slam Mexico on August 5, MJF attacked Andrade El Idolo and would secure the No. 2 entrant for the Casino Gauntlet match at All In the following week on Dynamite in a three-way match. After returning, MJF would carry his custom "Big Burberry Belt" design of the AEW World Championship and declared himself as the "one true champion". At All In on August 30, MJF failed to win the Casino Gauntlet match which was won by Andrade El Idolo. After two-month hiatus, MJF returned at Full Gear on November 14 and attacked the reigning AEW World Champion Will Ospreay after his successful title defense.

=== Consejo Mundial de Lucha Libre (2024–present) ===
MJF made his Consejo Mundial de Lucha Libre (CMLL) debut on the August 3, 2024 episode of Viernes Espectacular successfully defending his AEW American Championship against Templario. On July 16, 2025 at Informa, MJF made an appearance in a pre-taped video, where he challenged Averno to a match for the CMLL World Light Heavyweight Championship, which was later made official for August 1. On the August 1 episode of Viernes Espectacular, MJF defeated Averno to win the title. On the August 15 episode of Viernes Espectacular, MJF successfully defended his title against Zandokan Jr.. On September 19 at the CMLL 92nd Aniversario, MJF lost his title to Místico in a Title vs. Mask match, ending his reign at 49 days.

=== New Japan Pro-Wrestling (2026–present) ===
In October and November 2026, MJF made appearances for New Japan Pro-Wrestling (NJPW) in pre-taped vignettes, where he taunted and challenged Ryohei Oiwa to a match which Oiwa would later accept for Wrestle Kingdom 21.

== Professional wrestling style, persona, and reception ==
Friedman's character has been described by The New York Times as "part heel, part tool ... and part goodfella wannabe". Many people within the wrestling industry have praised him for his aggressive villainous character, largely due to his ability to blur the line between storylines and reality; he often insults fans and other non-professional wrestling celebrities on social media, and fellow wrestler Dasher Hatfield praised him for being able to "walk on the edge" and be a "heel without people calling him racist or homophobic". He has also been praised for his professionalism and skill, despite his young age, by the likes of Jim Ross, Jim Cornette, Tommy Dreamer and Chris Jericho.

== Personal life ==
Friedman began dating artist Naomi Rosenblum in 2020, and they were engaged in September 2022, but had broken up by February 2023. He started dating Canadian media personality Alicia Atout in February 2023. They married on September 5, 2025.

In a statement to The Players' Tribune, in relation to the Gaza war, Friedman said he did not "support terrorism, Zionism, genocide [and] genocidal governments, dead innocent Palestinians [and] dead innocent Israelis [...] And I’m sick that Hamas, a literal terrorist organization, has fans on this side of the world". Friedman has also described the conflict as "inhumane" in criticism of Israel and has expressed his dislike of Israeli Prime Minister Benjamin Netanyahu.

Friedman is a fan of the New York Giants, New York Mets, and the New York Islanders. Friedman has attention deficit hyperactivity disorder. He is represented by Bryan Diperstein of Adventure Media, who also represents other wrestlers such as Seth Rollins, Becky Lynch, and Oba Femi among others.

== Filmography ==
=== Film ===
| Year | Title | Role | Notes |
|---|---|---|---|
| 2023 | The Iron Claw | Lance Von Erich | Also executive producer |
| 2023 | Justice League x RWBY: Super Heroes & Huntsmen, Part Two | Waylon Jones / Killer Croc (voice) | Direct-to-Video |
| 2025 | Happy Gilmore 2 | Gordy Gilmore | |
| 2026 | Violent Night 2 | TBA | Post-production |
| TBA | Floaters | TBA | |

=== Television ===
| Year | Title | Role | Notes |
|---|---|---|---|
| 2001 | The Rosie O'Donnell Show | Himself | |
| 2021 | Rhodes to the Top | Himself | |
| 2023 | Impractical Jokers | Himself | |

== Championships and accomplishments ==
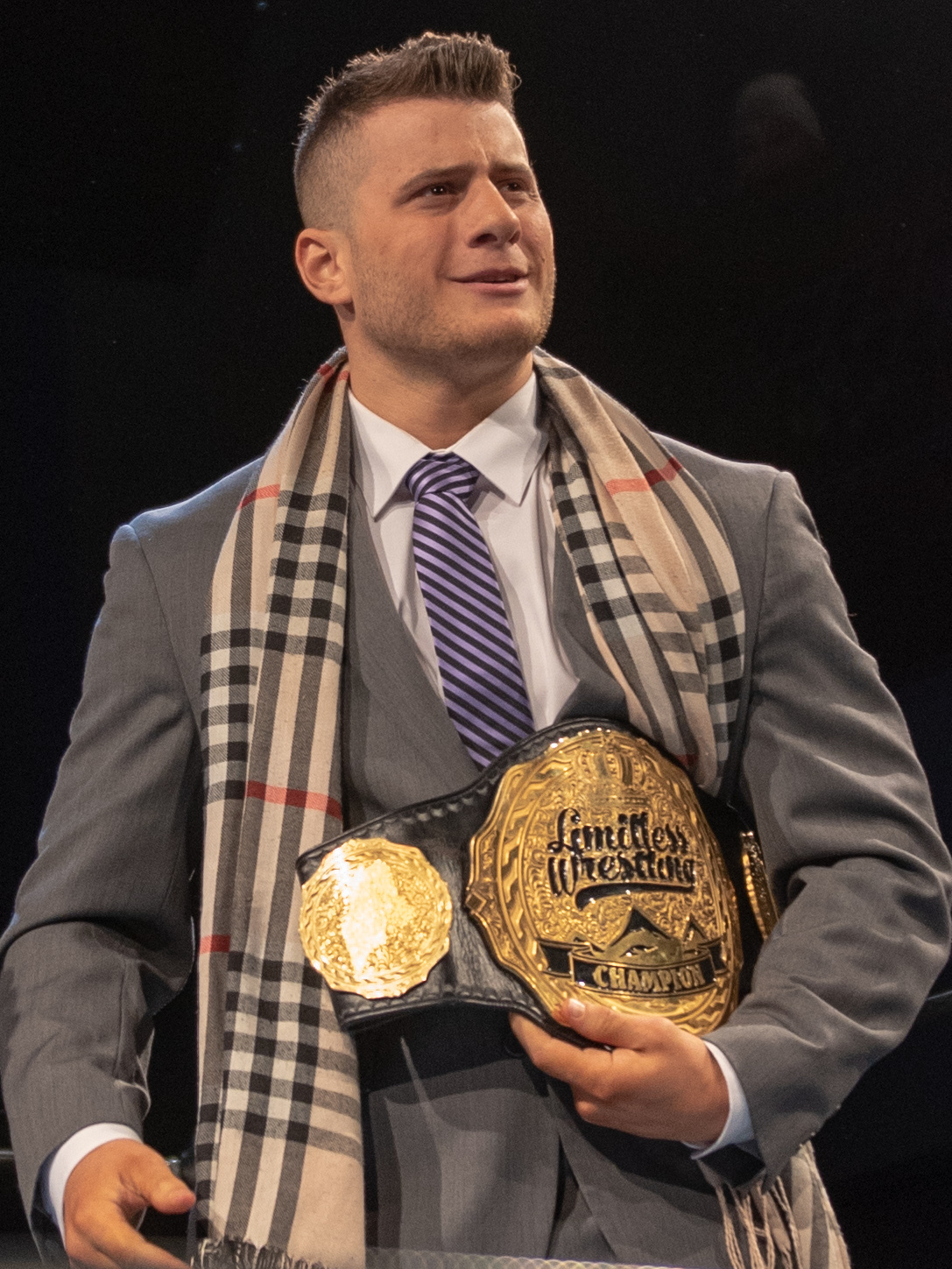
MJF as the Limitless Wrestling World Champion in 2019

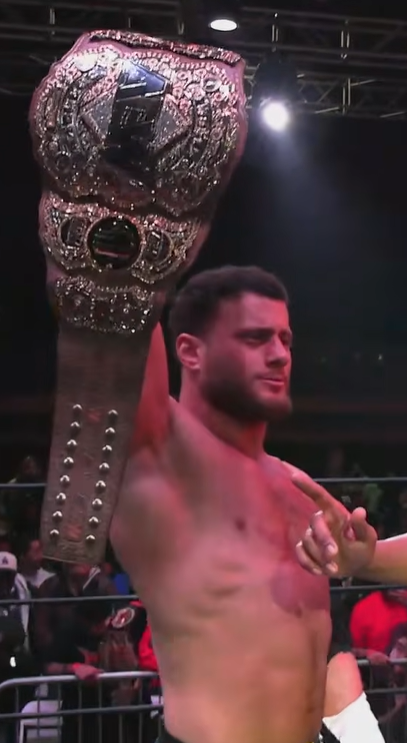
MJF is a three-time AEW World Champion, who during his reigns uses his custom "Big Burberry Belt" design

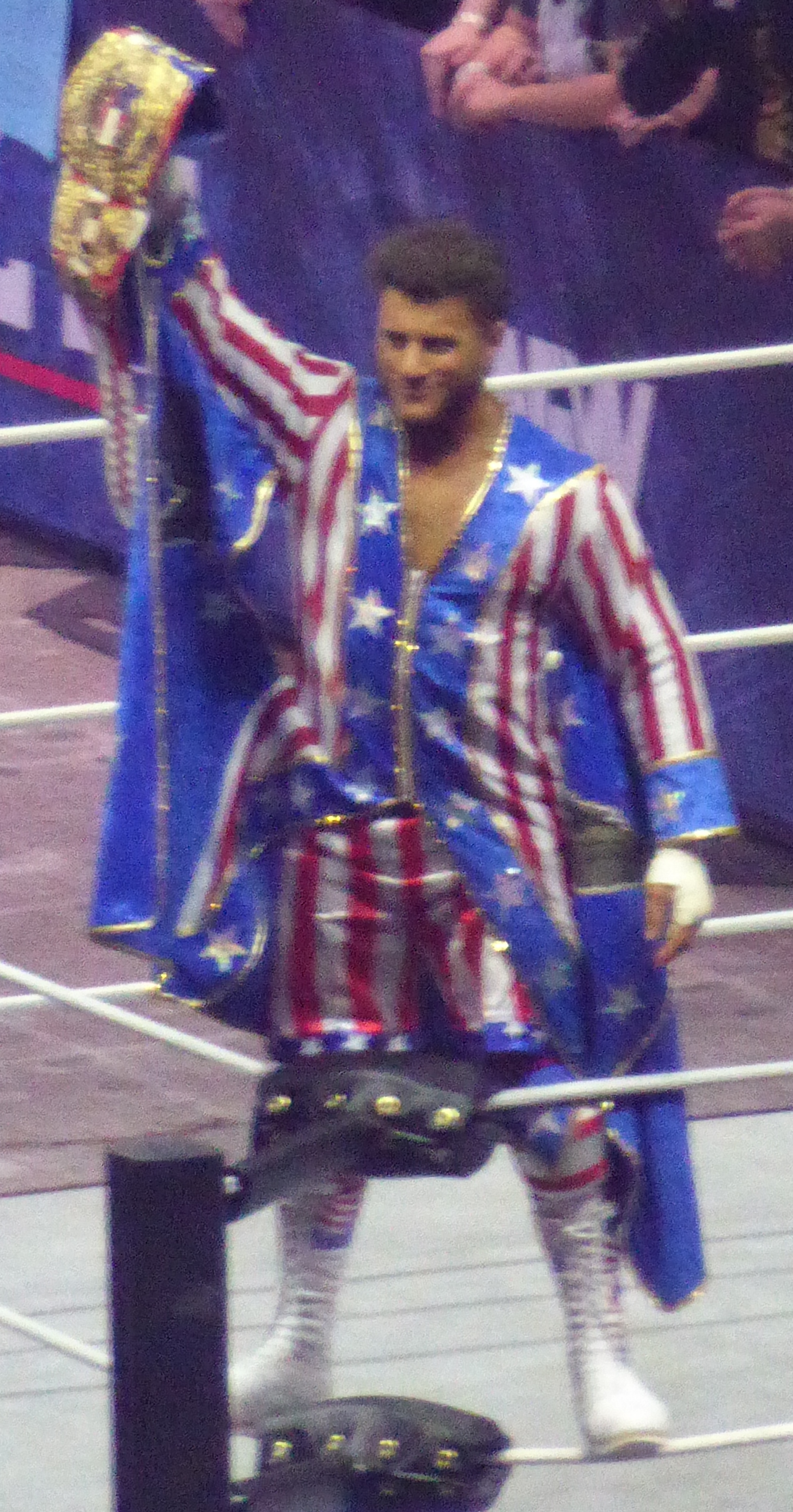
MJF with the "AEW American Championship", his custom version of the AEW International Championship

- AAW Wrestling
  - AAW Heritage Championship (1 time)
- All Elite Wrestling
  - AEW World Championship (3 times)
  - AEW International Championship (1 time) (Note: During his reign on July 24, 2024, MJF unofficially rebranded the title as the AEW American Championship with his own custom championship belt.)
  - "Real World Championship" (1 time, current, unrecognized) (Note: During his unrecognized reign, MJF has been billed as holding the "Triple B" championship belt and refers to himself as the "one true champion".)
  - AEW Dynamite Diamond Ring (2019–2024)
  - Casino Ladder Match (2022)
  - Blind Eliminator Tag Team Tournament (2023) – with Adam Cole
  - Casino Gauntlet match (2025)
  - Dynamite Award (1 time)
    - Best Mic Duel (2022) – MJF and CM Punk on Thanksgiving Eve
- Alpha-1 Wrestling
  - A1 Outer Limits Championship (1 time)
- CBS Sports
  - Rookie of the Year (2019)
- Combat Zone Wrestling
  - CZW Wired Championship (1 time)
  - CZW World Heavyweight Championship (1 time)
- Consejo Mundial de Lucha Libre
  - CMLL World Light Heavyweight Championship (1 time)
- DDT Pro-Wrestling
  - Ironman Heavymetalweight Championship (1 time)
- ESPN
  - Promo Artist of the Year (2022, 2023)
  - Ranked No. 1 of the 30 best Pro Wrestlers Under 30 in 2023
- Inspire Pro Wrestling
  - Inspire Pro Wrestling Pure Prestige Championship (1 time)
- LDN Wrestling
  - LDN Capital Wrestling Championship (2 times)
- Limitless Wrestling
  - Limitless Wrestling World Championship (1 time, inaugural)
- Major League Wrestling
  - MLW World Middleweight Championship (1 time)
  - MLW World Tag Team Championship (1 time) – with Richard Holliday
- Maryland Championship Wrestling
  - MCW Rage Television Championship (1 time)
- National Jewish Sports Hall of Fame
  - Class of 2023
- New York Post
  - Male Wrestler of the Year (2023)
  - Promo of the Year (2022) — "Pipebomb" promo
- Pro Wrestling Illustrated
  - Ranked No. 1 of the top 500 singles wrestlers in the PWI 500 in 2026
  - Feud of the Year (2021) vs. Chris Jericho
  - Feud of the Year (2022) vs. CM Punk
  - Most Hated Wrestler of the Year (2021, 2022)
  - Faction of the Year (2021) – with The Inner Circle
- Ring of Honor
  - ROH World Tag Team Championship (1 time) – with Adam Cole
- Rockstar Pro Wrestling
  - American Luchacore Championship (1 time)
  - Rockstar Pro Trios Championship (1 time) – with Ace Romero and Clayton Jackson
- Sports Illustrated
  - Ranked No. 3 of the top 10 wrestlers of 2023
- Wrestling Observer Newsletter
  - Best on Interviews (2021, 2022)
  - Most Charismatic (2020, 2022, 2023)
  - Worst Feud of the Year (2023, 2024) vs. "The Devil"/Adam Cole
- WrestlePro
  - WrestlePro Tag Team Championship (1 time) – with Valerio Lamorte
- Xcite Wrestling
  - Xcite International Championship (1 time)
- Other awards
  - Best Performance (2020) – for his rendition of "Me and My Shadow" with Chris Jericho (awarded by Wesley Morris of The New York Times)

== Luchas de Apuestas record ==
| Winner (wager) | Loser (wager) | Location | Event | Date | Notes |
|---|---|---|---|---|---|
| Místico (mask) | MJF (title) | Mexico City, Distrito Federal | CMLL 92nd Anniversary Show | September 19, 2025 | |
| MJF (hair) | Darby Allin (title) | Queens, New York | AEW Double or Nothing | May 24, 2026 | |

== See also ==
- List of Jewish professional wrestlers
