= The Rosie O'Donnell Show =

1996–2002 American television talk show

- Genre: Variety talk show
- Created by: Rosie O'Donnell
- Presented by: Rosie O'Donnell
- Starring: Rosie O'Donnell; John McDaniel
- Country of origin: United States
- Original language: English
- No. of seasons: 6
- No. of episodes: 1,193

Production
- Production locations: NBC Studios; New York City
- Running time: 42 minutes
- Production companies: KidRo Productions; Telepictures Productions; Warner Bros. Television

Original release
- Network: Syndicated
- Release: June 10, 1996 – June 27, 2002

The Rosie O'Donnell Show is an American daytime variety television talk show created, hosted, and produced by actress and comedian Rosie O'Donnell. It premiered on June 10, 1996, and concluded after six seasons on June 27, 2002.

This talk show was taped in Studio 8G at NBC's Rockefeller Center studios in New York City, New York, and was produced and distributed by KidRo Productions, Telepictures Productions, and Warner Bros. Television. The talk show won five Daytime Emmy Awards for Outstanding Talk Show.

== History ==
=== Debut ===
On June 10, 1996, The Rosie O'Donnell Show premiered, and proved successful. It was a replacement for Carnie!, which aired from September 6, 1995, to February 23, 1996. Warner Bros Domestic Television Distribution prematurely concluded Carnie! so that The Rosie O'Donnell Show could premiere in advance of the fall schedule.

=== 1996–1999 ===
In October 1996, a fire broke out at 30 Rockefeller Center in New York City. As a result, the show resumed taping for four days in the Ed Sullivan Theater (where David Letterman taped his show). The first episode resuming taping in the regular studio featured a beginning scene reminiscent of The Wizard of Oz, in which Rosie awakens from a dream.

O'Donnell often spoke of her admiration for Barbra Streisand, and in November 1997, Streisand (who rarely grants interviews) agreed to a full hour special. The set was covered in flowers and Streisand memorabilia. Streisand's husband, actor James Brolin, was also interviewed. Before this interview, O'Donnell received a brief letter from Streisand which she discussed on-air and held up very briefly. She described Streisand as being very caring in the letter, but would not read it on-air. It was too late, however, as a television camera caught a brief shot of the letter, and within days, savvy viewers distributed its contents. O'Donnell later expressed dismay that viewers would do that. Streisand was interviewed again in 1999 at her home, shortly before her Timeless tour.

On May 19, 1999, a month after the Columbine shootings, which prompted O'Donnell to become an outspoken supporter of gun control and a major figure in the Million Mom March, O'Donnell interviewed actor Tom Selleck, who was promoting a film The Love Letter. After a commercial break, O'Donnell confronted him about his recent commercial for the NRA and challenged him about the NRA's position on the use of assault rifles. According to Selleck, the two had agreed not to discuss the topic before his appearance on the show. O'Donnell maintains that Selleck and his publicist had been informed that the topic would be discussed. She stated at the end of the interview that it had not gone the way she had hoped it would have gone, but went on to say: "I would like to thank you for appearing anyway, knowing that we have differing views. I was happy that you decided to come on the show. And if you feel insulted by my questions, I apologize, because it was not a personal attack. It was meant to bring up the subject as it is in the consciousness of so many today."

=== 2000–2002 ===
In April 2001, O'Donnell had a two-week absence from her show because of a staph infection. She had guest hosts take her place, including Joy Behar, Meredith Vieira, Barbara Walters, Kathy Griffin, Marie Osmond, Jane Krakowski, Ana Gasteyer and Caroline Rhea.

On the May 11, 2001 episode, Maxwell Jacob Friedman appeared on the show as a five year child to sing "You Are My Sunshine" after his parents submitted a tape of him singing it in an operatic style while eating a pear. After a video of his performance resurfaced in 2019, Friedman (in-character) denied the appearance before admitting it, stating that Rosie O'Donnell was trying to cling onto her fading star and that he "didn't have the nerve" to tell Britney Spears (who appeared on the same episode) that she "wasn't going to make it as a singer". During his interview, when asked about what he wanted to be when he grew up, he said he would be an opera singer and a wrestler, and stated that Bill Goldberg and The Rock were his favorite wrestlers at the time.

Throughout the final season O'Donnell called on Caroline Rhea to host the program every Friday. Rhea's growing popularity as a guest host gave her the green light to host her own daytime talk show the following year, supposedly succeeding O'Donnell. However, Rhea's program lasted for only one season and was replaced by The Sharon Osbourne Show.

=== Ending ===
O'Donnell remarked in 2026 that she voluntarily ended the show after she had earned $100 million from it, and that she had been offered another $100 million from her syndicator to continue; she declined the offer, stating that she already had earned as much money as she felt any human could ever need and wanted to devote more time to being with her adopted children.

=== Charity fundraiser ===
On March 22, 2020, the show was revived for a one-episode fundraiser in support of The Actors Fund. Produced by O'Donnell and Erich Bergen, the episode was broadcast live on Broadway.com and the website's YouTube channel. It featured interviews and music performances with numerous celebrities. Over $600,000 was raised for The Actors Fund as a result of the episode.

== Format ==
Topics often discussed on the show include Broadway, children, extended families and charitable works, people and organizations.

The program was also known for featuring extended production numbers from Broadway shows which were often seen as too time-consuming on other shows. O'Donnell was known for keeping a light-hearted nature during the show as she playfully interviewed her guests and interacted with her audience. Commonly, O'Donnell would throw Koosh balls into the audience throughout the show; this gag expanded through the years to include automated Koosh-projecting devices in the ceiling, as well as O'Donnell firing at a moving target.

The house band was led by pianist John McDaniel, and was dubbed "The McDLTs".

Unique introductions by a member of the audience were made at the beginning of each episode. (Hi! I'm [insert audience member], from [insert resident's address] and this is The Rosie O'Donnell Show. On today's show: [insert guests and/or topics]. Hit it, John!). After the animated intro, the audience member would then say, "And now, here's Rosie!" as O'Donnell made her entrance through the curtain. O'Donnell commented on the DVD release of first season highlights that producers were not keen on this opening but Rosie insisted upon it as she enjoyed being able to talk to a "real person" every show.

=== Kids Are Punny ===
A long-running segment of the show involved telling jokes that children from around the United States mailed into the studio. These jokes were eventually compiled into two books (and eventually a TV special) entitled Kids Are Punny; proceeds from the book went to children's charity programs.

=== Product endorsements ===
O'Donnell's endorsement of the Tickle Me Elmo played a large part in the huge popularity of the toy. Likewise, she served Drake's snack cakes to audience members on The Rosie O'Donnell Show, which helped contribute to increased sales of Drake's cakes.

In February 1997, the mouthwash brand Scope released a list of the "least kissable celebrities," to which O'Donnell was ranked number one. O'Donnell responded by promoting rival mouthwash brand Listerine on her show. Listerine thanked O'Donnell by donating $1000 to O'Donnell's charity For All Kids every time a guest greeted O'Donnell with a kiss. Listerine donated more than $150,000.

== Reception ==
Early on, O'Donnell was dubbed "The Queen of Nice" by Newsweek magazine for her sweet personality, which was in stark contrast to many other talk shows of the era.

The New York Daily News labeled it the best new syndicated talk show of 1996.

=== Awards and nominations ===
The show won multiple Emmys such as five times Daytime Emmy Award for Outstanding Talk Show (1998-2002) during its run.

Awards and nominations
Award	Year (Note: Indicates the year of ceremony)	Category	Nominee(s)	Result	Ref.
GLAAD Media Awards	2003	Outstanding Talk Show Episode	"Adopted by Gay Parents"	Won	

== Home media ==
A compilation of highlights of the show's first season was available for sale in September 2008, exclusively from the Home Shopping Network. The DVD runs 90 minutes and contains Rosie O'Donnell commenting while watching clips of archived footage. Included are Tom Cruise's first visit, Fran Drescher's parents reviewing Florida restaurants, and the incident in which Donny Osmond made a fat joke at Rosie's expense.

In 2021, O'Donnell began making interviews from the show available on her personal YouTube channel until November 19, 2024 when the channel was terminated due to copyright issues.
