= Broadway Teachers Workshop =

Broadway Teachers Workshop (established in 2001) is a professional development program for theater teachers and academic and community theater directors from all over the world. The three-day conference includes multiple workshops, master classes with Broadway artists, and viewings of Broadway shows. The program, run by co-artistic directors Gordon Greenberg and Pam Pariseau, is designed to instruct and inspire teachers and directors of middle school, high school, university, and community theater and arts with new teaching methods, enhanced production skills, and an exchange of ideas with peers and professional Broadway artists.

== Participants from the Broadway community ==
- Lynn Ahrens
- Gaby Alter
- Charlie Alterman
- Angelina Avallon
- Hunter Bell
- Nell Benjamin
- Ken Billington
- Rob Bissinger
- Susan Blackwell
- Walter Bobbie
- Steven Booth
- Jason Robert Brown
- Catherine Brunell
- Tituss Burgess
- Haven Burton
- Paul Castree
- Donna Lynne Champlin
- Chuck Cooper
- Eden Espinosa
- Kathy Fitzgerald
- Peter Fitzgerald
- Stephen Flaherty
- David Foubert
- Christopher Gattelli
- Zina Goldrich
- Kate Grant
- Terry Greiss
- Kimberly Grigsby
- Mark Hartman
- Marcy Heisler
- Tina Howe
- Dennis Jones
- Tom Kitt
- David Larsen
- Kecia Lewis
- Bobby Lopez
- Brian MacDevitt
- Lauren Marcus
- Jeff Marks
- Kathleen Marshall
- Bob Martin
- Paul Masse
- Michael Mayer
- Kevin McCollum
- Kevin Moriarty
- Christine Noll
- Marsha Norman
- Laurence O'Keefe
- Stephen Oremus
- Erin Ortman
- Brad Oscar
- Benj Pasek
- Michael Passaro
- Jayne Paterson
- Justin Paul
- Jessica Phillips
- Larry Pressgrove
- Josh Rhodes
- Alice Ripley
- Tory Ross
- Stephen Schwartz
- Jeffery Seller
- Janet Smith
- Bobby Spencer
- Joe Stein
- Jeanine Tesori
- Alex Timbers
- Tony Walton
- Doug West
- Kate Whoriskey
- Jason Williams
- Peter Wolf
- Eric Woodall
- John Lloyd Young

== Classes taught ==
- Master classes with Tony Award winners and nominees including:
  - Lynne Ahrens and Stephen Flaherty, writing team for Seussical, Ragtime, Once on this Island
  - Kathleen Marshall, director/choreographer of Grease, Wonderful Town, The Pajama Game
  - Jeanine Tesori, composer for Shrek the Musical, Thoroughly Modern Millie, Caroline or Change
  - Ken Billington, lighting designer for over 80 Broadway shows, including Chicago, The Drowsey Chaperone, Fiddler on the Roof
  - Stephen Schwartz, composer for Wicked, Pippin, Godspell
  - Joe Stein, author of Fiddler on the Roof
  - Michael Mayer, director of Spring Awakening
  - Alice Ripley, performer in Next to Normal, Side Show, The Rocky Horror Show, Sunset Boulevard, and The Who's Tommy
- Die Vampires, Die creativity workshop with Title of Show cast member Susan Blackwell
- Spiderman workshop with musical director Kim Grigsby and associate scenic designer Rob Bissinger
- Choreography creation for non-dancers
- Directing techniques
- Text analysis
- Makeup
- Technical Production
- Stage Combat
- Fundraising and marketing
- Guide to career and educational paths from high school to Broadway
