= Show Me Where the Good Times Are =

Show Me Where the Good Times Are is a musical comedy with book by Leonora Thuna, music by Kenneth Jacobson, and lyrics by Rhoda Roberts. Inspired by Molière's The Imaginary Invalid, the play transplants the setting to the Lower East Side in 1913.

The musical ran off-Broadway in 1993.

== Summary ==
Aaron is a dour hypochondriac. Bella, his second wife, is a free-spirited hedonist. Aaron tries to force his daughter to marry a doctor so he can receive free medical care. He plays dead to see who really cares about him. The play ends with Aaron himself becoming a doctor.

== History ==
The play had a brief run at the Edison Theater in March 1970.
