= Happy Days (musical) =

2007 musical

- A New Musical
- Logo
- Music: Paul Williams
- Lyrics: Paul Williams
- Book: Garry Marshall
- Basis: Happy Days created by Garry Marshall
- Productions: 2007–2008: Goodspeed Opera House; 2007: Paper Mill Playhouse; 2009–2010: National U.S. Tour

Happy Days is a musical with a book by Garry Marshall and music and lyrics by Paul Williams, based on the ABC television series of the same name. The story is set roughly during Season 4 of the original sitcom. The story concerns the kids' plans to save Arnold's from demolition by hosting a dance contest and wrestling match.

== Synopsis ==
=== Act One ===
It is 1959 in Milwaukee, Wisconsin and Richie Cunningham and his best friends Potsie Weber and Ralph Malph are about to graduate high school and go off to college. His friends and family meet at Arnold's malt shop, and, together, bid the audience welcome ("Welcome to Wisconsin"). Arnold breaks the bad news that a construction company has plans to turn his restaurant into a mall. Arthur Fonzerelli (Fonzie) vows to save the day.

The next morning, Lori Beth tells how all the other girls are getting engaged before going to college, and she wants to know why she is not. This is interrupted when Ralph, Potsie, and Chachi drop by. Chachi then informs everyone that Fonzie's former flame, Pinky Tuscadero, is coming to Milwaukee to host the dance contest. After Fonzie leaves, the boys start their "Dial Tones" rehearsal. They talk about how much they do not know about girls ("The Thing About Girls"), but rehearse anyway ("Romeo Midnight").

Across town at the Leopard Lodge meeting ("Leopards Are We"), Howard suggests a wrestling match between the tough Malachi brothers, Fonzie's nemesis, and Fonzie. The Leopards promise Howard a plaque if he is able to talk Fonzie into the scheme, expecting it to bring a great deal of media coverage ("The Plaque").

Back at Arnold's, the Dial Tones welcome Pinky Tuscadero and she makes her grand entrance ("The Pink's in Town"). As Arnold takes Pinky and her Pinkettes into the kitchen to go over their schedule, the Malachis make their entrance ("Malachis"), only to have their bike crashed into by Fonzie. Arnold closes up before trouble ensues. At this moment, Fonzie and Pinky see each other for the first time in years, rekindling some old feelings. As Chachi and Fonzie talk about girls, we hear about Fonzie's and Pinky's history, and Chachi asked Fonzie how to know when something is over and how to get to know a girl. Fonzie says "you've just gotta learn to listen with your heart" ("Heartbeat").

At the Cunningham home, Marion, after being rebuffed by Howard, ponders the plight of the 1950s housewife. She is joined by Joanie who laments the curse of being a lovelorn 1950s teen, for Joanie is in love with Chachi ("What I Dreamed Last Night").

Fonzie enters and is greeted by Richie. Richie tries to talk Fonzie out of wrestling at the match due to his bad knee, but Fonzie will have none of it. He reenters Arnold's, where Pinky is giving Joanie boy advice and tells her that all she has to do to dance with Chachi is listen to the music ("Message in the Music"). Pinky then asks Fonzie to slow it down on the jukebox and asks him to compete in the wrestling match. Everyone rejoices when he says yes.

After Richie finds out that Fonzie promised Pinky he would wrestle anyway, he promises the Fonz that he will tell everyone about his weakness. Fonzie laments about how he is torn between being embarrassed or risking serious injury ("Maybe it's Time to Move On").

=== Act Two ===
A week later, Fonzie is still missing and everyone realizes how much he means to them. With Fonzie gone, there can be no media frenzy surrounding a nonexistent wrestling match, and Arnold's is doomed. Richie tells the gang that he will wrestle the Malachis in Fonzie's place, with Ralph in his corner. However, Ralph wants no part of it, but the guys insist they cannot run, but must face the challenge and get the job done ("Run").

At Arnold's, Pinky tells everyone of Fonzie's nomadic nature and that he may never return, which makes Joanie wonder if Chachi could do the same. Pinky, missing her guy advises Joanie to remain strong ("Legend in Leather"). Fonzie is on the outskirts of town, his efforts to leave unsuccessful. Joined by several carhop, Fonzie admits that his reign of cool could be over and that he is feeling lost ("Aaay'mless").

Back at Arnold's, the Malachi brothers discover that they will not be wrestling Fonzie so they humiliate Richie and Ralph by giving them wedgies just in time for pictures for the local paper. After this they believe with Fonzie gone the "fun" will begin and they will be tearing Richie and Ralph, who have opted to wrestle in Fonzie's place, apart ("Malachi's reprise").

In the Cunningham kitchen, Marion and Joanie are preparing for the picnic when Pinky stops in to give Marion a shotglass from Cincinnati. Pinky is in awe of the domestic lifestyle of Marion, while Marion is envious of the adventurous lifestyle of Pinky, while Joanie sits at home wondering how Chachi is going to feel at prom ("What I Dreamed Last Night" [reprise]).

Later, Marion finds Fonzie hiding under the stairs. She reminds him that true cool, like James Dean and Elvis Presley, means not caring what others think. She leaves him in thought, and Fonzie's two heroes appear, convincing Fonzie that guys like them change direction for a worthy cause and the higher road is the only road ("Guys Like Us").

At Pfister Park, the wrestling match is getting underway. Everyone gets in the ring, and Ralph runs away, yet again, when suddenly, Fonzie rolls in on his motorcycle. He offers to fight for Arnold's if the brothers promise not to touch his bad knee. The Malachis cheat, but with Richie's help, the good guys prevail.

Everyone celebrates while Fonzie and Pinky resolve to forget old issues and go Dancing ("Dancing on the Moon"). The Leopards present their plaque to Fonzie, but he focuses everyone's attention to the truly cool businessman—Howard Cunningham ("Ordinary Hero"). Everyone goes into a Plunger Dance, where they all dance with their plungers they are buying from the hardware store, decorated with bright colors and fantastic designs. This is all thanks to Marion and a few jars of Mayonnaise and food coloring. Fonzie announces to a joyous crowd that enough money has been raised to save Arnold's.

The Class of 1959 Graduation Dance begins. Ralph is accompanied by two of the Pinkettes, Potsie by his mother, and Joanie and Chachi sneak in together. Marion and Howard are called in as chaperones, and Pinky and Fonzie come together. Everyone celebrates the happy days they have spent together as the 50s draw to a close and the gang gets ready for the 60s ("Happy Days").

== Musical numbers ==
Act 1

- "Welcome to Wisconsin" – Richie, Fonzie, Company
- "Snap" – Fonzie and Car Hops
- "The Thing About Girls" – Richie, Ralph, Potsie, and Chachi
- "Romeo Midnight" – The Dial Tones
- "Ooooooh Bop" – Fonzie and The Dial Tones
- "Leopards Are We" – The Leopards
- "The Plaque" – The Leopards
- "The Pink's in Town" – Pinky and The Pinkettes
- "Malachis" – The Malachi Brothers
- "Heartbeat" – Fonzie, Chachi, and Calendar Girls
- "The Plaque Reprise" – Howard
- "What I Dreamed Last Night" – Marion and Joanie
- "Message in the Music" – Pinky, Company
- "Maybe It's Time to Move On" – Fonzie, Dial-Tones, and Company

Act 2

- "Run" – Ralph, Richie, Potsie, and Chachi
- "Legend in Leather" – Pinky and Pinkettes
- "Aaay'mless" – Fonzie, Pinky, Car Hops
- "Malachis (Reprise)" – The Malachi Brothers
- "What I Dreamed Last Night (Reprise)" – Pinky, Marion, and Joanie
- "Guys Like Us" – Fonzie, Elvis, James Dean, and guys
- "Hot Love" – The Dial-Tones
- "Dancing on the Moon" – Fonzie and Pinky
- "Ordinary Hero" – Fonzie, Company
- "Happy Days" – Fonzie, Pinky, Company

== Productions ==
The musical debuted at the Falcon Theatre in Burbank, California, directed by Marshall, and was produced by Marshall, his sister Ronny Hallin, and his daughter, Kathleen Marshall. The production was choreographed by Randy Skinner.

Happy Days was produced at the Goodspeed Opera House, East Haddam, Connecticut, where the musical ran from August 9, 2007 to September 2, 2007 at the Norma Terris Theatre in Chester, Connecticut. After being "expanded and refined" the musical then ran from April 11, 2008 to July 4, 2008 at the Goodspeed Opera House, directed by Gordon Greenberg and choreographed by Michele Lynch. It also played at the Paper Mill Playhouse, Millburn, New Jersey from September 26, 2007 to October 28, 2007, directed by Gordon Greenberg, and choreographed by Michele Lynch.

The musical bypassed Broadway and went directly into a National Tour, starring Joey Sorge (Saturday Night) as The Fonz, Felicia Finley as Pinky Tuscadero (The Wedding Singer), Steven Booth as Richie Cunningham, and Cynthia Ferrer as Marion Cunningham.

In January 2014, the musical toured Europe and the UK. The cast for the touring production included Ben Freeman as The Fonz, Heidi Range as Pinky Tuscadero and Cheryl Baker as Mrs Cunningham.

== Reception ==
The New York Times reviewer wrote of the Goodspeed Opera production of 2008: "If you’re going to make a stage musical out of a television show, 'Happy Days' is not a bad choice. All that cheerful white-bread 1950s innocence. All those instant audience associations with beloved characters and the actors who played them. The show won’t ever win a Pulitzer Prize (or the musical-comedy equivalent), but the Goodspeed Opera House’s bouncy new production delivers a pleasant if not transporting evening, and – most important – the Fonz (Joey Sorge) is cool" and "Michele Lynch's choreography is one of the show's real assets".

According to the show's official site, the "NY Daily News" wrote: "If you like GREASE you will LOVE Happy Days" – A powerhouse rock and roll trip down memory lane". However, TheatreMania.com panned the musical in 2007, calling it bland.
