= Mike Santana =

American professional wrestler (born 1991)

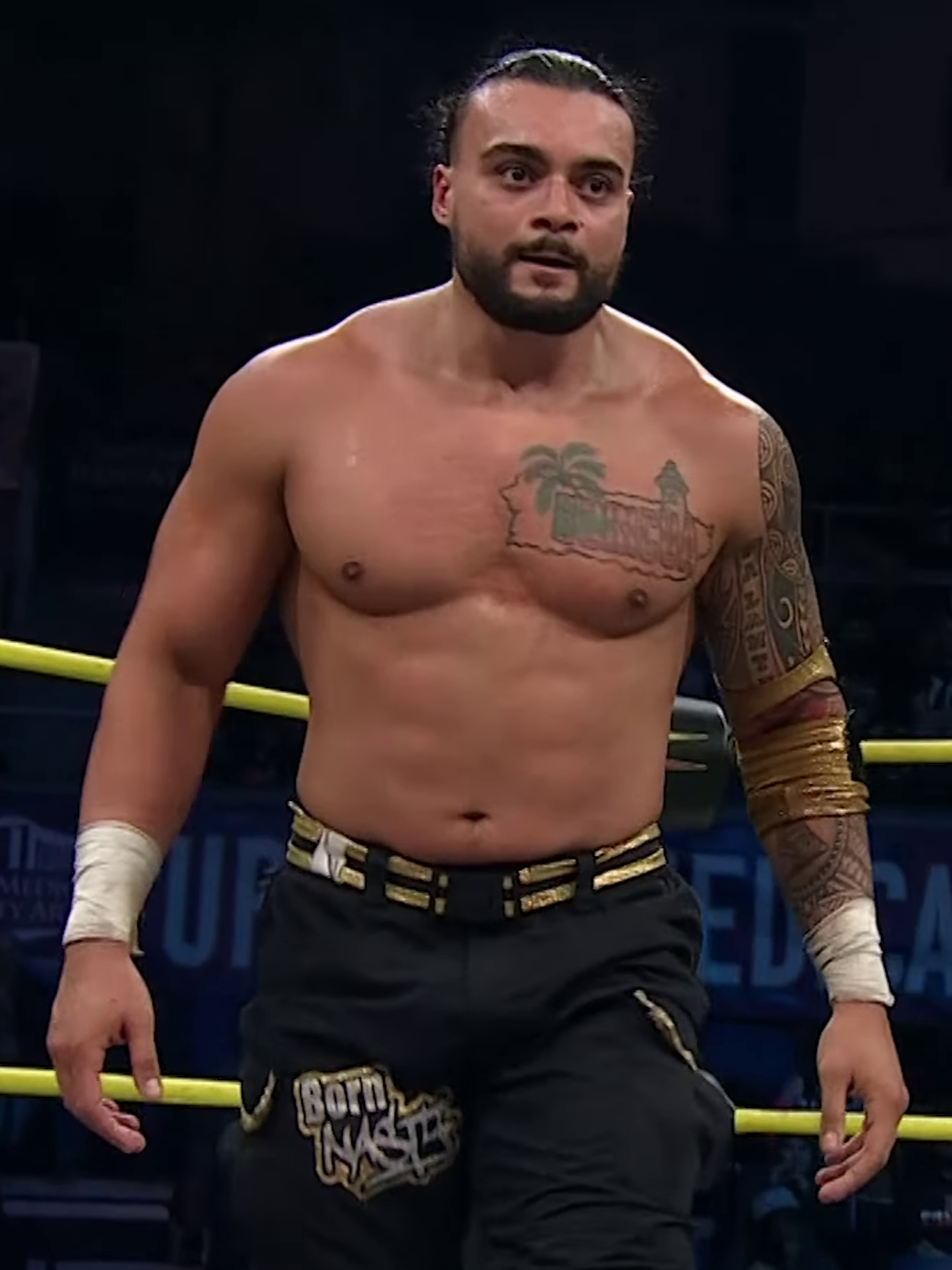
- Santana in 2026

Personal information
- Born: Mark Sanchez; February 4, 1991 (age 35) New York City, New York, U.S.
- Children: 1

Professional wrestling career
- Ring name(s): Cruz Montana; Mike Draztik; Mike Santana; Santana
- Billed height: 6 ft 0 in (183 cm)
- Billed weight: 230 lb (104 kg)
- Billed from: "The Bronx, New York"
- Trained by: Magic
- Debut: November 2007

Mark Sanchez (born February 4, 1991) is an American professional wrestler. He is signed to WWE, where he is assigned to the NXT brand under the ring name Cruz Montana and is a member of The 946 stable.

In 2012, Sanchez, then known as Mike Draztik, formed a tag team with Angel Ortiz, known as EYFBO and worked on the American independent scene for several years. They won titles such as the AAW Tag Team Championship, CZW World Tag Team Championship and the HOG Tag Team Championship. In 2017, Draztik and Ortiz were hired by TNA, then known as Impact Wrestling, and changed their names to Santana and Ortiz respectively. They joined Konnan as the members of Latin American Xchange (LAX) and won the Impact World Tag Team Championship four times, holding the record for most combined days as champions, with 662 days and, at one point, the record as the longest reign with 261 days. They also won GFW Tag Team Championship and unified the title with the Impact Tag Team Championship. Santana and Ortiz left the promotion in 2019 and, soon after, joined the newly created All Elite Wrestling, where they joined Chris Jericho's stable The Inner Circle. After Jericho and Jake Hager turned on them, Santana and Ortiz teamed up with Eddie Kingston. Santana changed his name to Mike Santana and left AEW in March 2024. In April 2024, he returned to Total Nonstop Action Wrestling (TNA), where he became a two-time TNA World Champion. He departed TNA once again in July 2026 and signed with WWE that same month as Cruz Montana.

== Professional wrestling career ==
=== Early career (2007–2017) ===
Sanchez debuted in 2007. He spent the first years of his career primarily wrestling in New York and New Jersey. In 2012, Sanchez, then known as Mike Draztik, formed a tag team with Angel Ortiz, known as EYFBO and worked on the American independent scene for several years. They won titles such as the AAW Tag Team Championship, CZW World Tag Team Championship and the HOG Tag Team Championship.

=== Impact Wrestling (2017–2019) ===
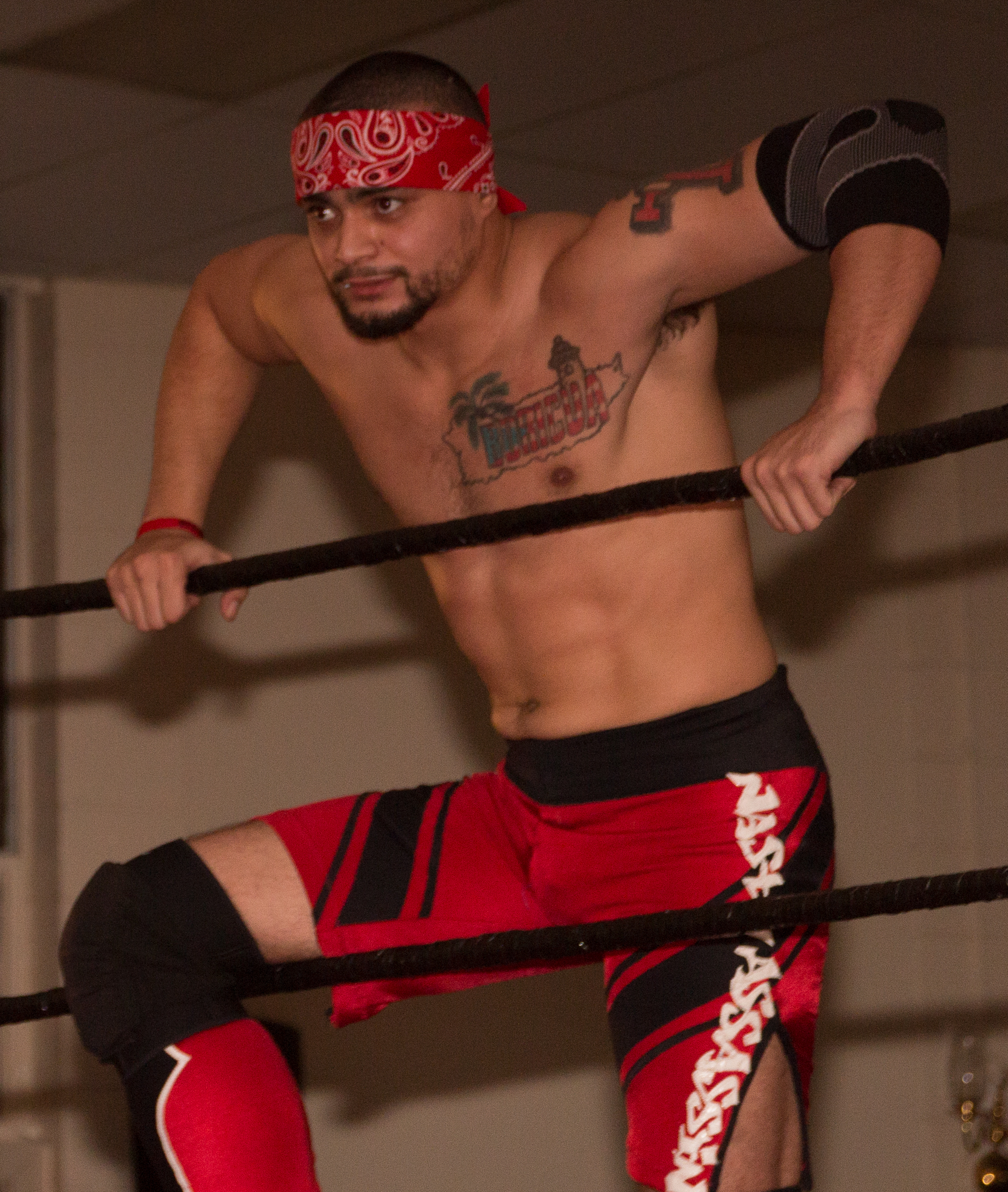
Santana in 2017

On the March 16, 2017 episode of Impact Wrestling, Sanchez, under the ring name Santana, made his debut as a member of the Latin American Xchange (LAX), alongside Ortiz. They became part of LAX with Homicide, Diamante, and manager Konnan, attacking Decay, Laredo Kid, Garza Jr., and Reno Scum to insert themselves in the Impact World Tag Team Championship picture and winning them the following week, establishing themselves as heels in the process. On the March 30 episode of Impact, Ortiz and Santana defeated Decay, Laredo Kid and Garza Jr. and Reno Scum to win the Impact World Tag Team Championship for the first time. On the April 23 episode of Impact Wrestling, Santana and Ortiz defeated Veterans of War (Mayweather and Wilcox) in a tournament finals to win the GFW Tag Team Championship. On November 5 at Bound for Glory, they lost to Ohio Versus Everything (OVE), when as part of a double turn with Sami Callihan interfering on OVE's behalf, Jake Crist performing a low blow on Ortiz, and OVE attacking them after the match, thus turning LAX into faces in the process.

On the May 24, 2018 episode of Impact King became the newest member of LAX. After the group leader Konnan was attacked, and Homicide and Diamante went missing in action, King assumed leadership of the faction and guided Ortiz and Santana back to being tag team champions. In June, Konnan and Diamante returned, both showing suspicion about King's involvement with the group. On the July 5, 2018 episode of Impact, Konnan confronted King who admitted that it was he who had "taken out a hit" against Konnan to take over the faction. King then attempted to get Ortiz and Santana to recognize him as the new head of the group but they rejected this and stood beside the original leader, Konnan. Then, former LAX members Hernandez and Homicide returned, entering the ring and attacking Konnan, Santana and Ortiz. At Bound for Glory on October 14, Hernandez and Homicide lost to Ortiz and Santana in a Concrete Jungle Death match.

On January 12, 2019, The Lucha Bros (Pentagón Jr. and Rey Fénix) defeated Santana and Ortiz at the TV Tapings in Mexico to win the Impact World Tag Team Championships. Santana and Ortiz would reclaim them at the Rebellion pay per view on April 28. They held the titles until July, when they lost them to The North (Ethan Page and Josh Alexander).

On July 8, it was revealed that Santana and Ortiz would soon be leaving Impact and had interest from WWE and All Elite Wrestling. During August 9 tapings Santana and Ortiz were given a "send off" by the Impact locker room. Santana confirmed the following day that he and Ortiz were in fact done appearing on Impact Wrestling.

=== All Elite Wrestling (2019–2024) ===
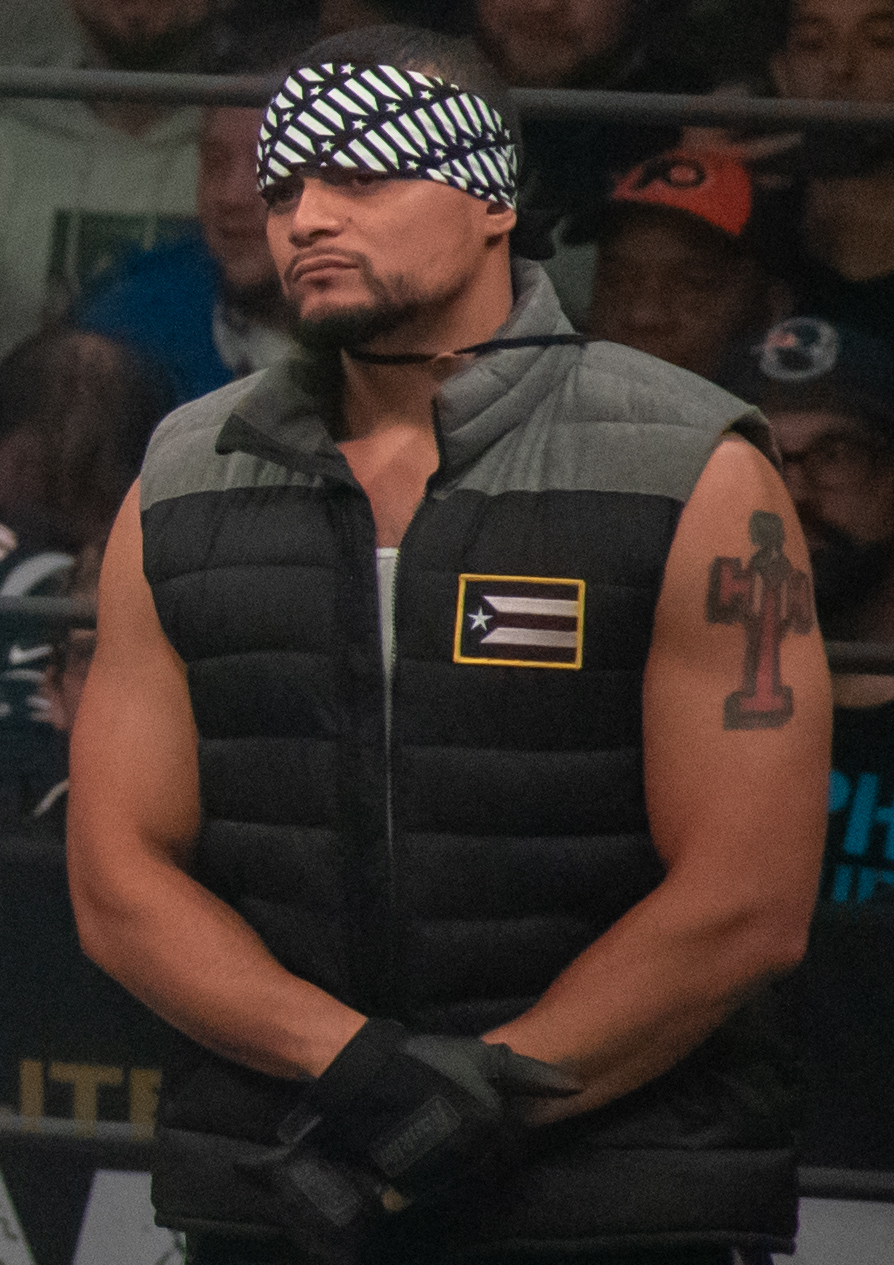
Santana in 2019 as part of the Inner Circle

On August 31, 2019, at All Out, Santana and Ortiz debuted as heels for All Elite Wrestling (AEW), attacking both Lucha Brothers (Pentagón Jr. and Fénix) and The Young Bucks (Matt Jackson and Nick Jackson) after their tag team ladder match. On October 2, the inaugural episode of Dynamite, they teamed with Chris Jericho in the main event and defeated The Elite (Kenny Omega and The Young Bucks). Led by Jericho, they subsequently formed a new faction along with Sammy Guevara and Jake Hager called The Inner Circle. On November 9 Full Gear, Santana and Ortiz were defeated by the Young Bucks. In 2020, the Inner Circle began a feud with The Elite. At Double or Nothing on May 23, The Inner Circle were defeated by The Elite and Matt Hardy in a Stadium Stampede match.

In March 2021, the Inner Circle began feuding with The Pinnacle, thus turning Santana and Ortiz faces in the process. On the Blood and Guts episode of Dynamite on May 5, The Inner Circle lost to The Pinnacle in the inaugural Blood and Guts match. However, in the main event of Double or Nothing on May 30, The Inner Circle defeated The Pinnacle in a Stadium Stampede match.

On the February 9, 2022 episode of AEW Dynamite, the Inner Circle had a team meeting that ended with Sammy Guevara throwing his vest and walking out. It was later announced that Jericho and Hager would face Santana and Ortiz in a tag team match the following week, with it being billed as the Inner Circle Implodes match. On the March 9, 2022 episode of Dynamite, the Inner Circle was disbanded after Jericho and Hager attacked Santana and Ortiz and formed an alliance with 2point0 and Daniel Garcia. On the June 29, 2022 at Blood And Guts, Santana and Ortiz competed in the main event with Eddie Kingston and the Blackpool Combat Club, defeating the Jericho Appreciation Society in a Blood and Guts match. During the match, Santana suffered a torn ACL and was rendered out indefinitely.

After the tag team returned following Santana's recovery from injury, Santana had his ring name tweaked to Mike Santana. The team competed alongside the Blackpool Combat Club, losing to Kingston, Penta El Zero M and Best Friends in a Stadium Stampede match at All In at Wembley Stadium on August 27. After the event, the team disbanded which led to a match on AEW Rampage on October 27, where Santana defeated Ortiz. After the match, Santana requested and was granted his release from AEW in March 2024, ending his almost five-year tenure with the company.

=== Return to Total Nonstop Action Wrestling (2024–2026) ===
==== Various feuds (2024–2025) ====
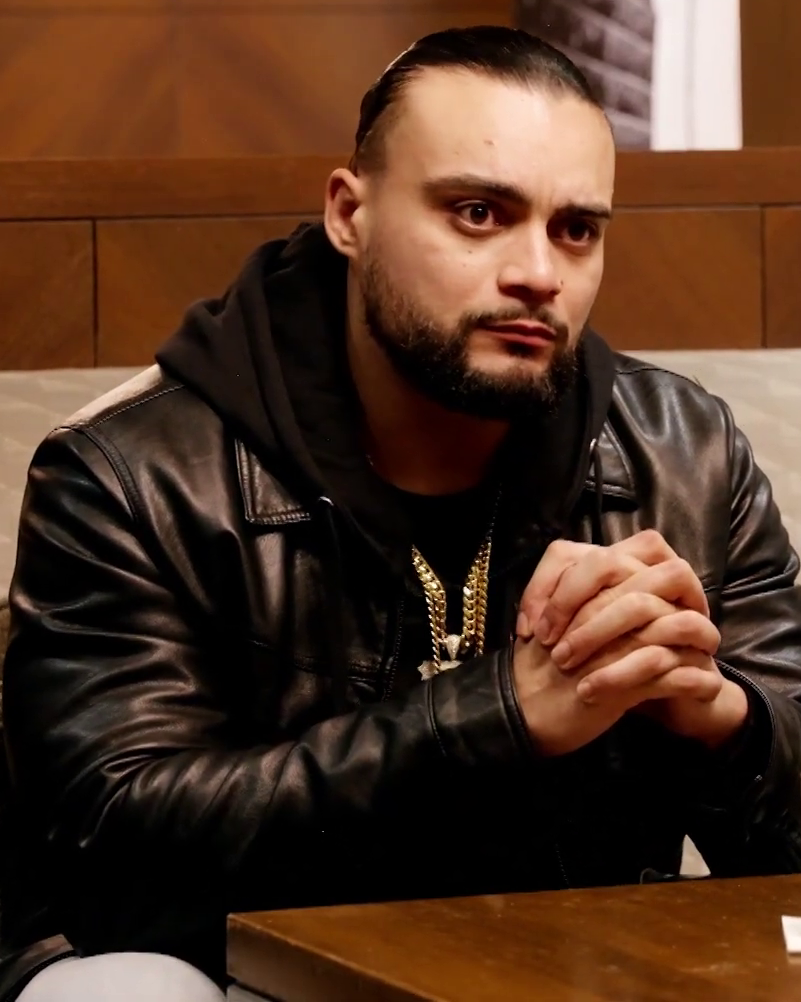
Santana in 2026

On April 20, 2024, Santana made his return to Total Nonstop Action Wrestling (TNA; formerly known as Impact Wrestling) at Rebellion, defeating Steve Maclin. On April 24, it was announced by TNA that Santana had signed with the promotion. In June, Santana began a feud with The System, after they cost Santana a chance to qualify for the TNA World Championship match at Slammiversary. At Slammiversary, Santana defeated Jake Something. Following Slammiversary, Santana focused fully on The System and get revenge for the attacks on him. On the August 15 episode of TNA Impact!, Santana lost to Moose. At Emergence, Santana teamed with The Hardys and Joe Hendry to face The System in an eight-man tag team match, in a losing effort. On the September 19 episode of Impact!, Santana defeated JDC in a Texas Death Match. Following the match, Moose attacked Santana. This led to a rematch between the two at Bound for Glory. At the event, Santana defeated Moose to end the feud. At Turning Point, Santana defeated Frankie Kazarian. At Final Resolution, Santana competed in a four-way match to determine the number-one contender for the TNA World Championship, which involved Joe Hendry, Steve Maclin, and Josh Alexander. However, Hendry won the match.

Following the match, Santana began a feud with Josh Alexander, taking Alexander's headgear. After defeating the Northern Armory in a Gauntlet match and later getting attacked by the group, Santana defeated Alexander in an "I quit" match at Genesis to end the feud. Following the match, the two men shook hands and Alexander quit TNA.After Genesis, Santana entered a feud with Mustafa Ali. In the build-up, Ali taunted Santana's past of being a drug addict and crashed one of his counselling sessions. On March 14 at Sacrifice, Santana was defeated by Ali. Due to Ali cheating at Sacrifice, Santino Marella made a rematch for the following episode of Impact!, where Santana defeated Ali by countout. At Rebellion, Santana defeated Ali in a Falls Count Anywhere match to end the feud. On July 20 at Slammiversary, Santana failed to win the TNA World Championship from Trick Williams in a three-way match, also involving Joe Hendry.

==== TNA World Champion (2025–2026) ====
On October 12, 2025, at Bound for Glory, Santana defeated Trick Williams to win the TNA World Championship for the first time and his first singles world championship in a major promotion. On November 13, 2025, Santana lost the TNA World Championship to Frankie Kazarian after getting into a brawl with NXT talent and Kazarian was the winner of The Call Your Shot Gauntlet Match at Bound For Glory, ending his first reign at 32 days.

On January 15, 2026 on Thursday Night Impact!'s AMC debut, Santana defeated Frankie Kazarian to win the TNA World Championship for the second time. Two days later at Genesis, Santana defeated Kazarian to retain the title in a Texas deathmatch. At No Surrender, Santana and Leon Slater defeated Nic Nemeth and Eddie Edwards. On March 27 at Sacrifice, Santana defended his title against Steve Maclin but the bout was ruled a no contest after Maclin was legitimately knocked out after taking a superkick from Santana. While medical was tending to Maclin, Eddie Edwards, who had a guaranteed world title shot from a Feast or Fired match, attempted to attack Santana but Santana was able to fend him off. At Rebellion on April 11, Santana successfully defended his title against Eddie Edwards. On the April 23 episode of Impact Wrestling, Santana defeated Rich Swann to retain the title. At Slammiversary, Santana lost the title to Nic Nemeth, ending his second reign at 164 days in his last match for TNA. After the event, it was reported that Santana had departed TNA with his contract expiring on July 15.

==== One time return (2026) ====
Santana made a one-off appearance as Cruz Montana at the TNA Hall of Fame in 2026 to induct Konnan.

=== WWE (2025–present) ===
==== Sporadic appearances; NXT (2025–2026) ====
Through TNA's working relationship with WWE, Santana made several appearancers for the promotion on their developmental brand NXT in 2025 and 2026. Santana would notably challenge Trick Williams for the TNA World Championship on the June 3, 2025 episode of NXT, but failed to win the title after interference from First Class (AJ Francis and KC Navarro), and led Team TNA to defeat Team NXT at Showdown on October 7, 2025 in a 4-on-4 men's Survivor Series style elimination match, last eliminating Ricky Saints to win the match for Team TNA. On July 21, 2026, Santana signed a contract with WWE and was assigned to the NXT brand, making his first appearance as a signed talent on that night's episode of NXT under the name Cruz Montana. He performed on NXT for three months, challenging for the NXT Championship twice.

==== The 946 (2026–present) ====
On the November 2, 2026 episode of Raw, Montana made his main roster debut, joining The 946 stable and turning heel. On November 16, he teamed with fellow 946 (professional wrestling) teammate Carmelo Hayes to defeat The Usos in a tag team match, earning their group an advantage for the 2026 WarGames.

== Personal life ==
He has one daughter. He was close friends with his former tag team partner Miguel Molina, better known as Ortiz, before the two had a falling out in 2022. Sanchez later stated that there were no hard feelings on his part and wished Molina well.

== Championships and accomplishments ==
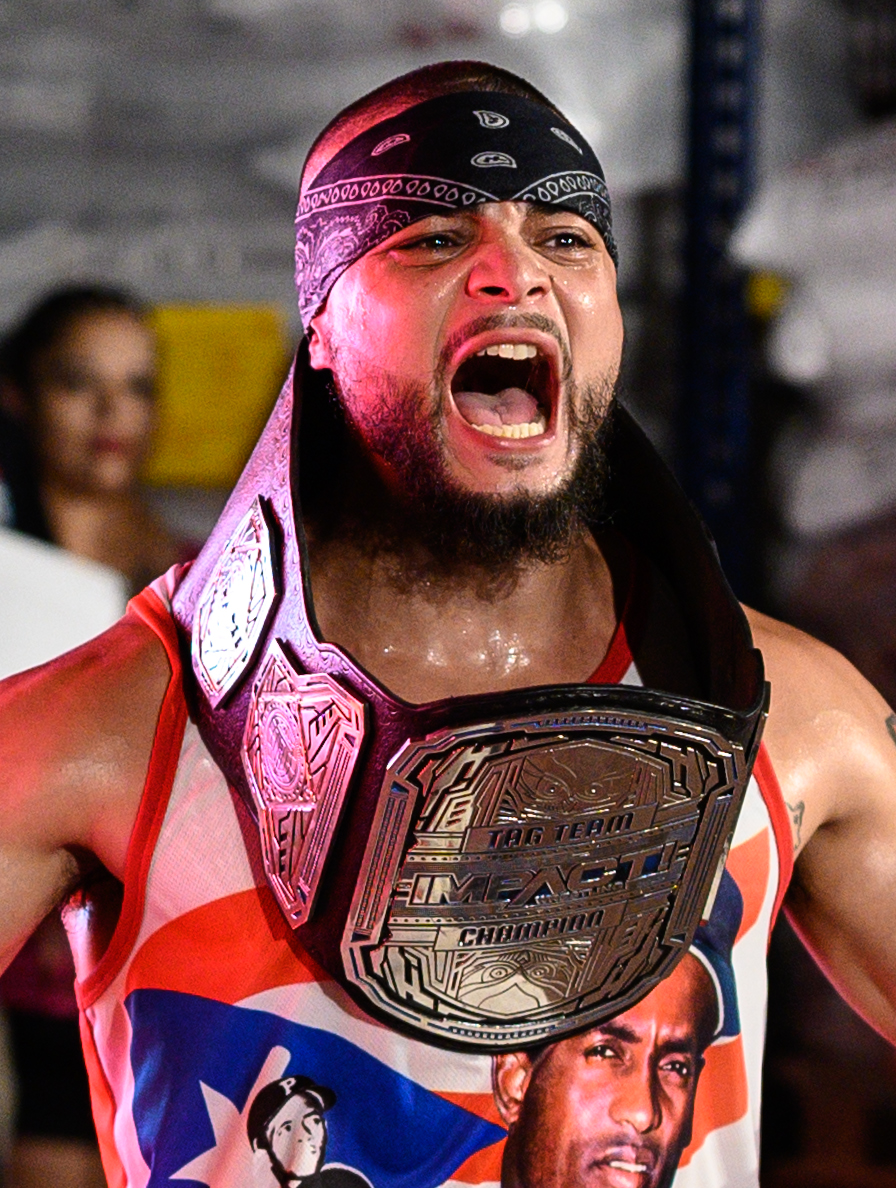
Santana is a four-time TNA World Tag Team Champion.

- AAW: Professional Wrestling Redefined
  - AAW Tag Team Championship (1 time) – with Ortiz
- All Elite Wrestling
  - Dynamite Award (3 times)
    - "Bleacher Report PPV Moment of the Year" (2021) – Stadium Stampede match (The Elite vs. The Inner Circle) – Double or Nothing (May 23)
    - "Biggest Beatdown" (2021) – The Inner Circle jumping Orange Cassidy – Dynamite (June 10)
    - Hardest Moment to Clean Up After (2021) – (Best Friends vs. Santana and Ortiz) – Dynamite (September 16)
- Combat Zone Wrestling
  - CZW World Tag Team Championship (1 time) – with Ortiz
- Global Force Wrestling
  - GFW Tag Team Championship (1 time, final) – with Ortiz
- House of Glory
  - House of Glory Heavyweight Championship (1 time)
  - HOG Tag Team Championship (3 times) – with Ortiz
- Jersey Championship Wrestling
  - JCW Tag Team Championship (1 time) – with Ortiz
- Latin American Wrestling Entertainment
  - LAWE Heavyweight Championship (1 time, inaugural)
- Pro Wrestling Illustrated
  - Faction of the Year (2021) – with The Inner Circle
  - Most Inspirational Wrestler of the Year (2025)
  - Ranked No. 13 of the top 500 singles wrestlers in the PWI 500 in 2026
- The Wrestling Revolver
  - Revolver Tag Team Championship (1 time) – with Ortiz
- Total Nonstop Action Wrestling / Impact Wrestling
  - TNA World Championship (2 times)
  - Impact World Tag Team Championship (4 times) – with Ortiz
  - TNA Year End Awards (2 times)
    - Male Wrestler of the Year (2025)
    - Match of the Year (2025) vs. Mustafa Ali at Rebellion
- WrestlePro
  - WrestlePro Tag Team Championship (1 time) – with Ortiz
- Warriors Of Wrestling
  - WOW Tag Team Championship (1 time) – with Ortiz
- World Wrestling League
  - WWL World Tag Team Championship (1 time) – with Ortiz
