= Anthony Gangone =

American professional wrestler

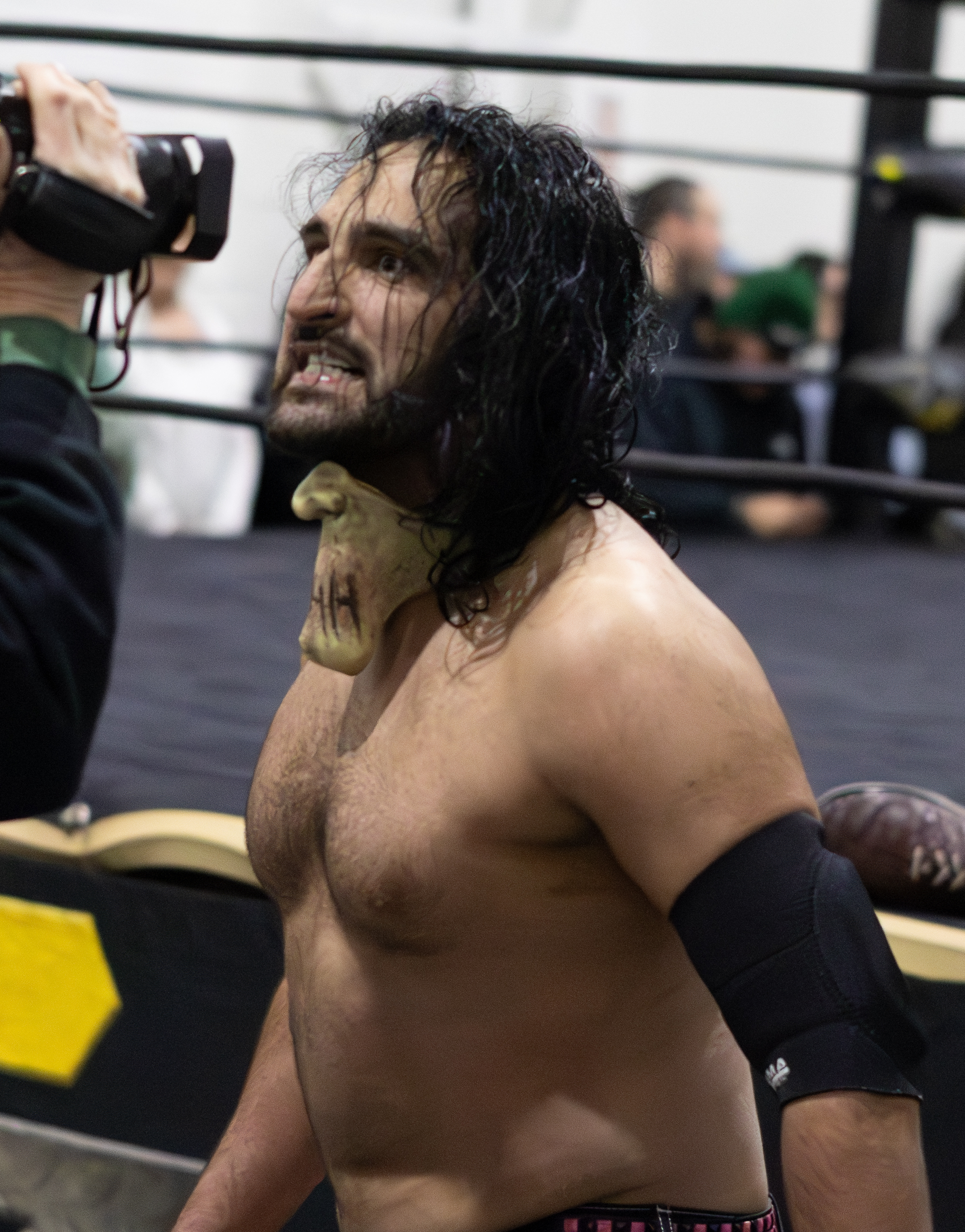
- Gangone in February 2026

Personal information
- Born: New York City, New York, United States

Professional wrestling career
- Ring name: Anthony Gangone El Hijo de Padre El Pendejo
- Billed height: 175. 26cm
- Billed weight: 86 kg (190 lb)
- Trained by: Amazing Red; Brian XL
- Debut: 2013

Anthony Gangone is an American professional wrestler, currently working as a freelancer on the independent circuit. He is best known for his time in House of Glory (HOG), where he is a former two-time HOG Heavyweight Champion.

== Professional wrestling career ==
=== House of Glory (2013–2022) ===
Gangone is best known for his seven-year tenure with House of Glory. He made his professional wrestling debut in the promotion, having competed for the first time at FTW/HOG The Showdown, a cross-over event promoted alongside Fight The World Wrestling on April 12, 2013, where he fell short to John Silver in singles competition.

During his time with the promotion, he won the HOG Heavyeight Championship on two separate occasions. First at All or Nothing on September 24, 2016, by defeating Ethan Carter III, and secondly at High Intensity 7 on August 7, 2018, by defeating Amazing Red. His second reign is still the longest to date with 1,374 days. Gangone vacated the title over his contract with the promotion expiring. Gangone won the HOG Tag Team Championship once at High Intensity 4 on May 29, 2015, by teaming up with Joey Janela and defeating Amazing Red and Crimson.

=== Game Changer Wrestling (2015–2017) ===
Gangone briefly competed in Game Changer Wrestling. He made his debut in the promotion on the second night of the GCW Food Truck & Rock Carnival from September 20, 2015, where he unsuccessfully challenged Pinkie Sanchez for the GCW Extreme Championship in a three-way match which also involved Smiley. On the same day but at the evening show, Gangone fell short to Monsta Mack in singles competition. At GCW The Arrival on June 24, 2017, Gangone unsuccessfully competed in a five-way match won by Brandon Kirk and also involving Facade, Jimmy Lloyd and Malek Avalon.

=== Combat Zone Wrestling (2016–2020; 2023–present) ===
Gangone made his debut in Combat Zone Wrestling at CZW Dojo Wars #90 on August 31, 2016, where he fell short to Frankie Pickard in a best two out of three falls match for the CZW Medal of Valor Championship. During his time with the promotion, he won the CZW World Tag Team Championship on one occasion alongside Amazing Red as the "House of Gangone" by defeating The REP (Dave McCall and Nate Carter) at Trifecta Elimination 2019 on March 2.

Gangone competed a signature event promoted by CZW, the CZW Best of the Best, in which he made his only appearance at the 2019 edition where he unsuccessfully competed in a four-way match for the CZW World Heavyweight Championship won by Anthony Greene and also involving reigning champion Mance Warner and B-Boy.

Due to Combat Zone Wrestling holding business partnerships with Impact Wrestling, Gangone seldomly competed in cross-over events promoted by the two companies. At Impact Wrestling Code Red on May 5, 2019, he retained the HOG Heavyeight Championship against Ken Broadway and Moose in a three-way match.

=== All Elite Wrestling (2021) ===
Gangone made his All Elite Wrestling debut at AEW Dark: Elevation #41 on December 8, 2021, (aired December 13) where he teamed up with Mike Verna in a losing effort against The Inner Circle (Ortiz and Santana) in tag team competition.

== Championships and accomplishments ==
- Victory Pro Wrestling
  - VPW Championship (1 time, current)
- American Championship Entertainment
  - ACE Heavyweight Championship (1 time, current)
  - ACE Diamond Championship (2 times)
- BriiCombination Wrestling
  - BCW Grand Dragon Championship (1 time, inaugural)
  - BCW Grand Dragon Title Tournament (2022)
- Catalyst Wrestling
  - Catalyst Wrestling TV Championship / Sapphire TV Championship (1 time)
- Constant Pro Wrestling
  - The Quest Tournament (2024)
- Championship Entertainment Productions
  - CEP Forever 5 Championship (1 time, inaugural)
  - Lucha Rumble Battle Royal (2023)
- Combat Zone Wrestling
  - CZW World Tag Team Championship (1 time) – with Amazing Red
- Five Borough Wrestling
  - FBW Heavyweight Championship (1 time)
- Fight The World Wrestling
  - FTW World Tag Team Championship (1 time) – with Mike Law
- House of Glory
  - HOG Heavyeight Championship (2 times)
  - HOG Crown Jewel Championship (2 times)
  - HOG Tag Team Championship (1 time) – with Joey Janela
  - House of Glory Rumble (2015) – with Marq Quen
- Intense Wrestling Alliance LLC
  - IWA Heavyweight Championship (1 time)
- Revival Pro Wrestling
  - RPW United States Championship (1 time)
- Suffolk Wrestling Alliance
  - SWA Pride Championship (1 time)
  - SWA Tag Team Championship (2 time, current) – with Jay Flyier (1) and Brook Attah (1, current)
- Superstars Of Wrestling Federation
  - SWF Tag Team Championship (1 time) – with TJ Marconi
- Titan Championship Wrestling
  - TCW Heavyweight Championship (2 time)
- Proving Ground
  - PG DLC Championship (1 time, current)
- Xcite Wrestling
  - Xcite International Championship (1 time)
- World Wrestling Organization
  - WWO Tag Team Championship (1 time) – with Marq Quen
