= Santana and Ortiz =

Professional wrestling tag team

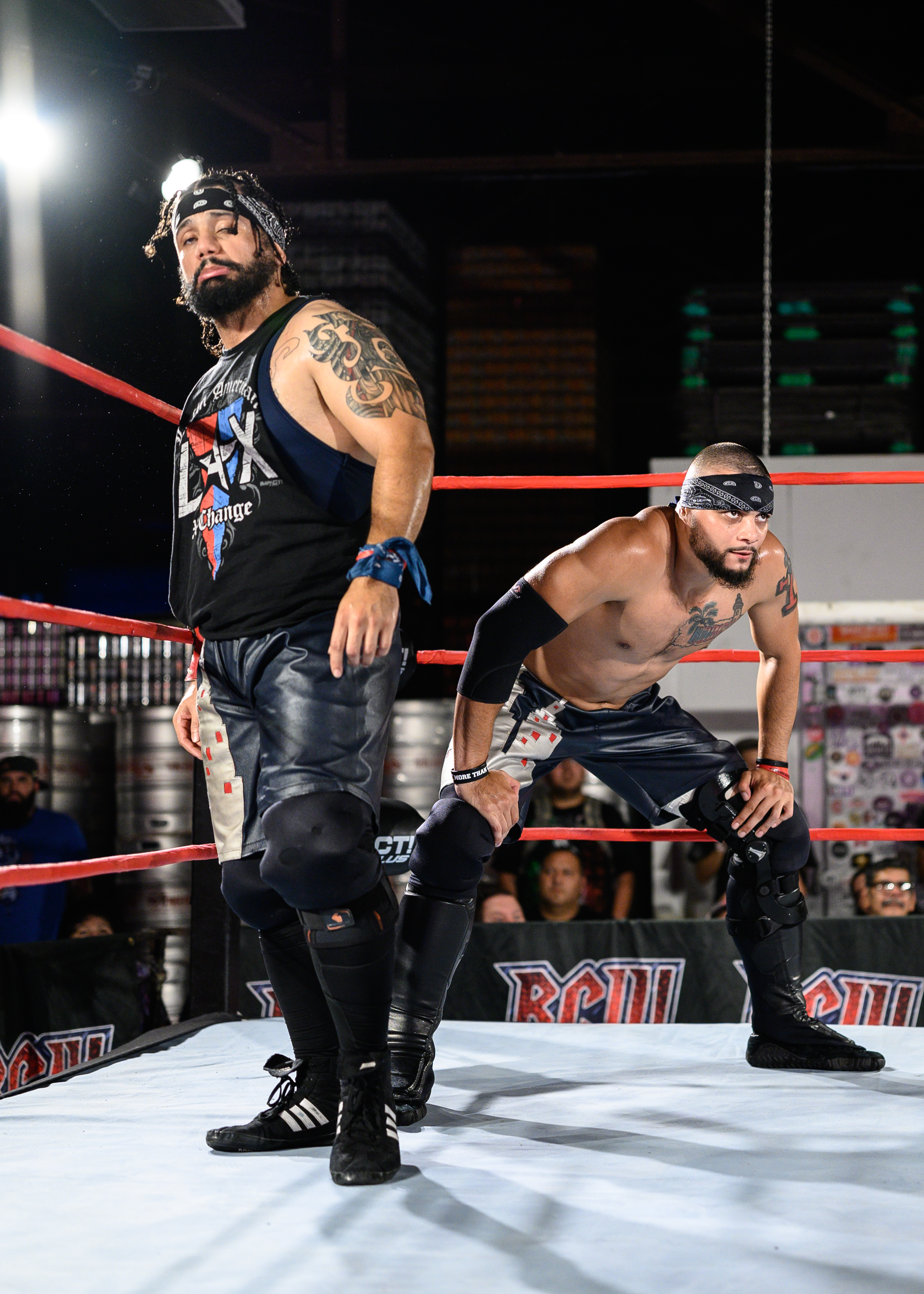
- Mike Santana (right) and Ortiz (left) in 2019

Tag team
- Name(s): The Latin American Xchange / LAX; EYFBO; Proud & Powerful; Santana and Ortiz
- Members: Angel Ortiz / Ortiz; Mike Draztik / Mike Santana / Santana
- Billed from: New York City, New York
- Debut: March 9, 2012
- Disbanded: August 27, 2023
- Years active: 2012–2023

Santana and Ortiz, sometimes nicknamed Proud & Powerful, were an American professional wrestling tag team consisting of Mike Santana and Ortiz, who are best known for their time together in Total Nonstop Action Wrestling (TNA) and All Elite Wrestling (AEW).

In 2012, Sanchez and Molina, then known as Mike Draztik and Angel Ortiz respectively, formed a tag team known as EYFBO (acronym for Entertain Your Fucking Balls Off or Entertain Your Freakin Butt Off) and worked for several years on the American independent circuit. They won several titles, including the AAW Tag Team Championship, CZW World Tag Team Championship and the HOG Tag Team Championship.

In 2017, they were hired by Impact Wrestling, and changed their names to Santana and Ortiz. They joined Konnan as the members of the stable The Latin American Xchange (LAX) and became a big part of the promotion's tag team division. During their time in Impact, they were four time Impact World Tag Team Champions, holding the record for most combined days as champions, with 662 days and, at one point, the record as the longest reign with 261 days. They also won GFW Tag Team Championship and unified the title with the Impact Tag Team Championship. Santana and Ortiz left the promotion in 2019 and, soon after, joined the newly created All Elite Wrestling (AEW), where they joined Chris Jericho's stable The Inner Circle. After a dispute in The Inner Circle, they left and teamed up with Eddie Kingston. They disbanded in 2024 and Santana subsequently left AEW that same year.

== History ==
=== Impact Wrestling (2017–2019) ===
On the March 16, 2017 episode of Impact Wrestling, Santana and Ortiz were part of LAX with Homicide, Diamante, and manager Konnan. LAX attacked Decay, Laredo Kid, Garza Jr., and Reno Scum inserting themselves in the Impact World Tag Team Championship picture and winning them the following week, establishing themselves as heels in the process. On the March 30 episode of Impact Wrestling, Ortiz and Santana defeated Decay, Laredo Kid and Garza Jr. and Reno Scum to win the Impact World Tag Team Championship. On the April 23 episode of Impact Wrestling, Santana and Ortiz defeated Veterans of War (Mayweather and Wilcox) in a tournament finals to win the GFW Tag Team Championship. On November 5 at Bound for Glory, they lost to Ohio Versus Everything (OVE) as part of a double turn with Sami Callihan interfering on OVE's behalf, Jake Crist performing a low blow on Ortiz, and OVE attacking them after the match, thus turning LAX into face in the process.

On the May 24, 2018 episode of Impact King became the newest member of LAX. After the group leader Konnan was attacked, and Homicide and Diamante went missing in action, King assumed leadership of the faction and guided Ortiz and Santana back to being tag team champions. In June, Konnan and Diamante returned, both showing suspicion about King's involvement with the group. On the July 5, 2018 episode of Impact, Konnan confronted King who admitted that it was he who had "taken out a hit" against Konnan to take over the faction. King then attempted to get Ortiz and Santana to recognize him as the new head of the group but they rejected this and stood beside the original leader, Konnan. Then, former LAX members Hernandez and Homicide returned, entering the ring and attacking Konnan's trio. At Bound for Glory on October 14, Hernandez and Homicide lost to Ortiz and Santana in a Concrete Jungle Death match.

On January 12, 2019, The Lucha Bros (Pentagón Jr. and Rey Fénix) defeated LAX during the TV Tapings in Mexico to win the Impact World Tag Team Championships. Santana and Ortiz would reclaim them at the Rebellion pay per view on April 28. They held the titles until July, when they lost them to The North (Ethan Page and Josh Alexander).

On July 8, it was revealed that Santana and Ortiz would soon be leaving Impact and had interest from WWE and All Elite Wrestling. During August 9 tapings Santana and Ortiz were given a "send off" by the Impact locker room. Santana confirmed the following day that he and Ortiz were in fact done appearing on Impact Wrestling.

=== All Elite Wrestling (2019–2023) ===
On August 31, 2019, at All Out, Santana and Ortiz debuted as heels for All Elite Wrestling (AEW), attacking both Lucha Brothers (Pentagón Jr. and Fénix) and The Young Bucks (Matt Jackson and Nick Jackson) after their tag team ladder match. On October 2, the inaugural episode of Dynamite, they teamed with Chris Jericho in the main event and defeated The Elite (Kenny Omega and The Young Bucks). Led by Jericho, they subsequently formed a new faction along with Sammy Guevara and Jake Hager called The Inner Circle. On November 9 Full Gear, Santana and Ortiz were defeated by the Young Bucks. In 2020, the Inner Circle began a feud with The Elite. At Double or Nothing on May 23, The Inner Circle were defeated by The Elite and Matt Hardy in a Stadium Stampede match.

In March 2021, the Inner Circle began feuding with The Pinnacle, thus turning Santana and Ortiz faces in the process. On the Blood and Guts episode of Dynamite on May 5, The Inner Circle lost to The Pinnacle in the inaugural Blood and Guts match. However, in the main event of Double or Nothing on May 30, The Inner Circle defeated The Pinnacle in a Stadium Stampede match.

On the February 9, 2022 episode of AEW Dynamite, the Inner Circle had a team meeting that ended with Sammy Guevara throwing his vest and walking out. It was later announced that Jericho and Hager would face Santana and Ortiz in a tag team match the following week, with it being billed as the Inner Circle Implodes match. On the March 9, 2022 episode of Dynamite, the Inner Circle was disbanded after Jericho and Hager attacked Santana and Ortiz and formed an alliance with 2point0 and Daniel Garcia. On the June 15, 2022 special episode of Dynamite Road Rager, Ortiz would have his head shaved after losing a hair vs. hair match to Jericho. On the June 29, 2022 at Blood And Guts, Santana and Ortiz competed in the main event with Eddie Kingston and the Blackpool Combat Club, defeating the Jericho Appreciation Society in a Blood and Guts match. During the match, Santana suffered a torn ACL and was rendered out indefinitely.

During his absence, it was reported Santana and Ortiz had problems working together. After the tag team returned following Santana's recovery from injury, Santana had his ring name changed to Mike Santana. The team competed alongside the Blackpool Combat Club losing to Kingston, Penta El Zero M and Best Friends' Trent Beretta, Chuck Taylor and Orange Cassidy in a Stadium Stampede match at All In at Wembley Stadium on August 27. After the event, the team disbanded which led to a match on AEW Rampage on October 27, where Santana defeated Ortiz. In March 2024, Santana's profile was removed from AEW's official website, ending his almost five-year tenure with the company.

=== Lucha Libre AAA Worldwide (2019) ===
On September 8, 2019, Santana and Ortiz debuted with the Mexican promotion Lucha Libre AAA Worldwide (AAA), earning their first victory after defeating the team of Arez and Daga and Laredo Kid and Myzteziz Jr.

== Championships and accomplishments ==
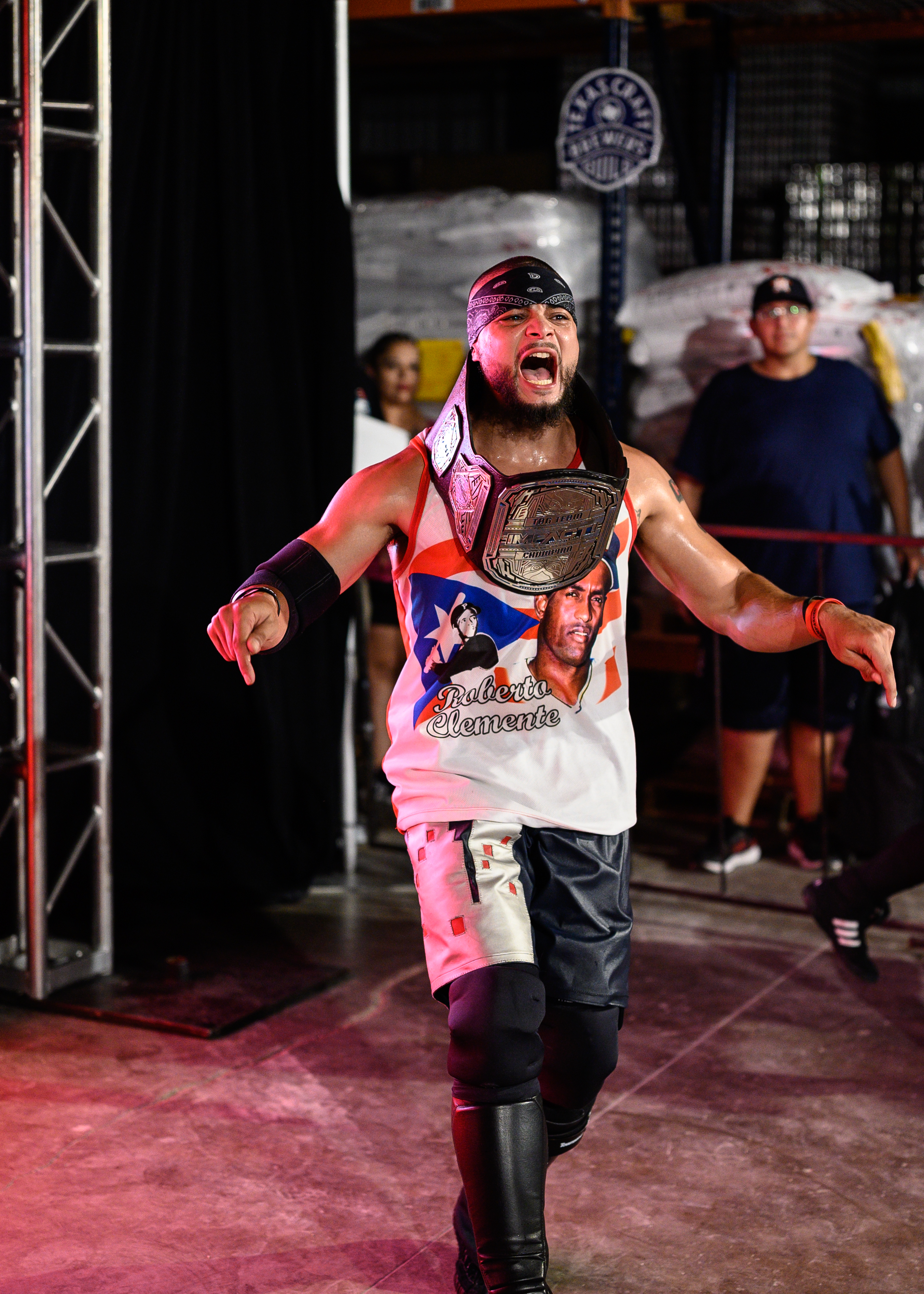
Santana with the Impact Tag Team Championship belt

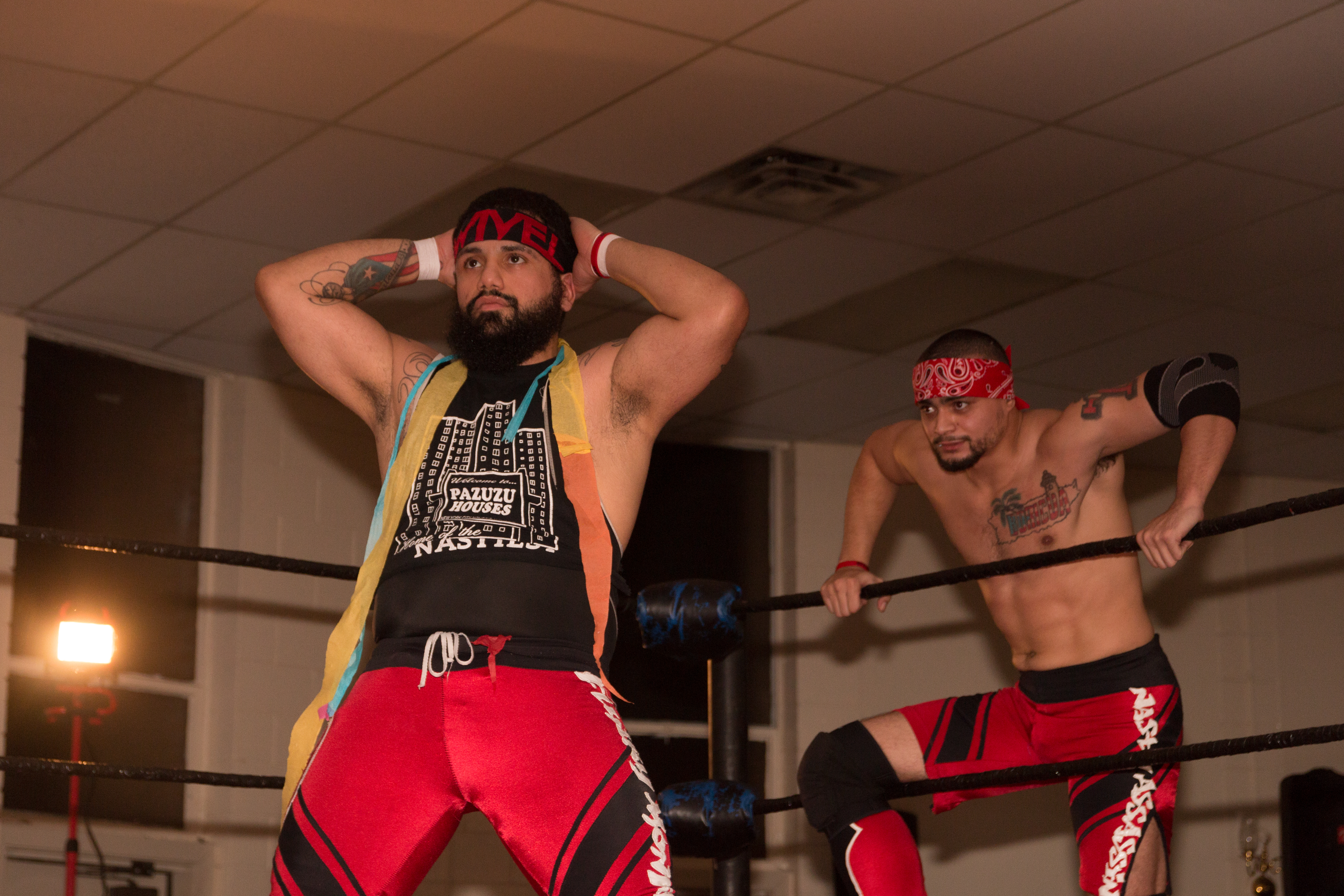
Before they signed with Impact, Santana and Ortiz worked as EYFBO in the independent circuit

- AAW: Professional Wrestling Redefined
  - AAW Tag Team Championship (1 time)
- All Elite Wrestling
  - Dynamite Award (3 times)
    - "Bleacher Report PPV Moment of the Year" (2021) – Stadium Stampede match (The Elite vs. The Inner Circle) – Double or Nothing (May 23)
    - "Biggest Beatdown" (2021) – The Inner Circle jumping Orange Cassidy – Dynamite (June 10)
    - Hardest Moment to Clean Up After (2021) – (Best Friends vs. Santana and Ortiz) – Dynamite (September 16)
- Combat Zone Wrestling
  - CZW World Tag Team Championship (1 time)
- House of Glory
  - HOG World Heavyweight Championship (1 time) – Santana
  - HOG Tag Team Championship (3 times)
- Impact Wrestling
  - GFW Tag Team Championship (1 time)
  - Impact World Tag Team Championship (4 times)
  - Impact Year End Award (1 time)
    - Tag Team of the Year (2018)
- Jersey Championship Wrestling
  - JCW Tag Team Championships (1 time)
- Greektown Wrestling
  - Greektown Wrestling Championship (1 time) – Santana
- Latin American Wrestling Entertainment
  - LAWE Heavyweight Championship (1 time) – Santana
- Pro Wrestling Illustrated
  - Faction of the Year (2021) – with The Inner Circle
  - Ranked Ortiz No. 115 of the top 500 singles wrestlers in the PWI 500 in 2019
  - Ranked Santana No. 119 of the top 500 singles wrestlers in the PWI 500 in 2019
- The Wrestling Revolver
  - PWR Tag Team Championship (1 time)
- WrestlePro
  - WrestlePro Tag Team Championship (1 time)
- Warriors Of Wrestling
  - WOW Tag Team Championship (1 time)
- World Wrestling League
  - WWL World Tag Team Championship (1 time)

== Luchas de Apuestas record ==
Winner (wager)	Loser (wager)	Location	Event	Date	Notes
Chris Jericho (hair)	Ortiz (hair)	St. Louis, Missouri	Road Rager	June 15, 2022	
