= Pentagón Jr. =

Mexican professional wrestler (born 1985)

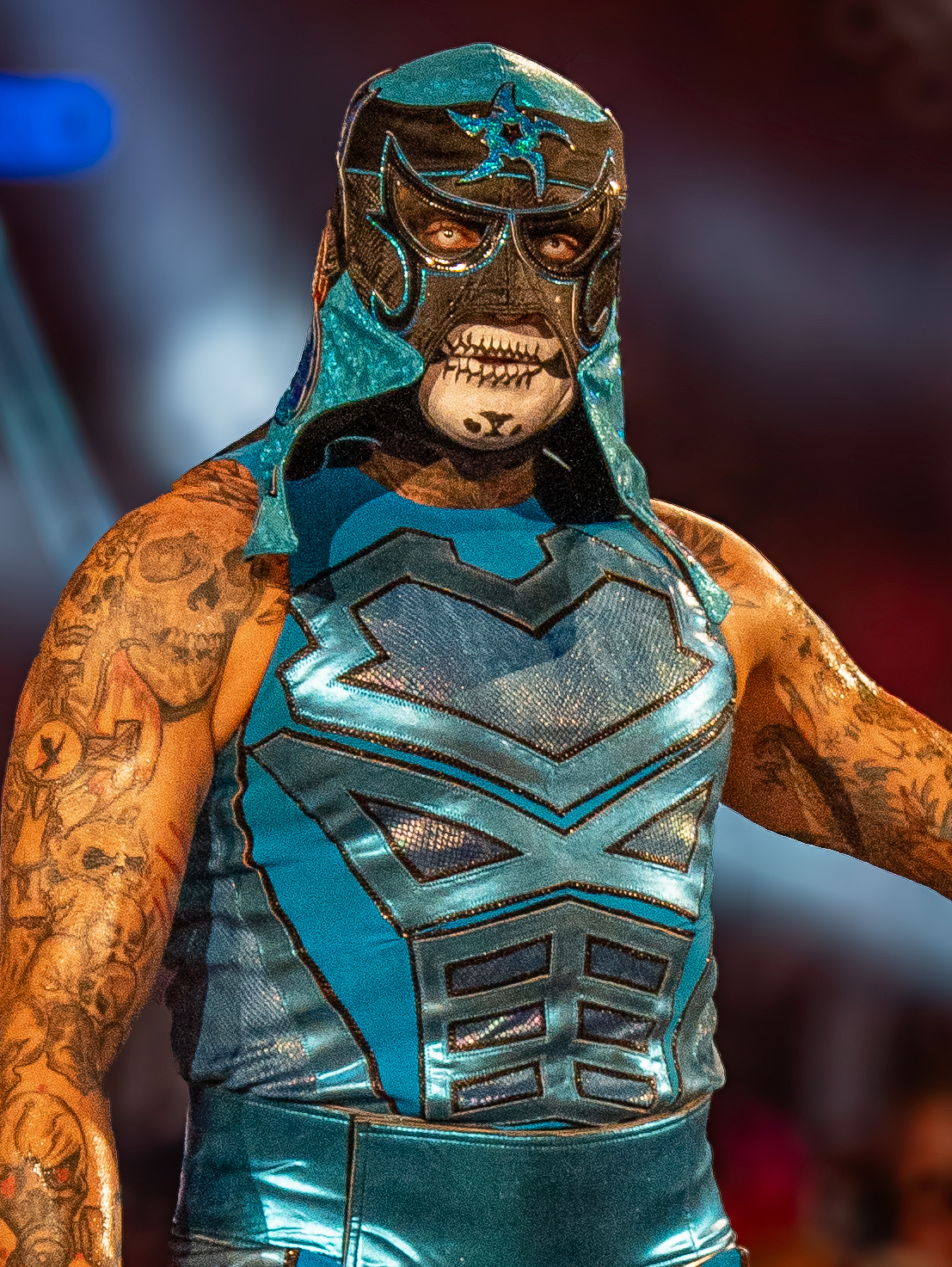
- Penta in 2025

Personal information
- Born: February 5, 1985 (age 41) Ecatepec de Morelos, State of Mexico, Mexico
- Children: 3
- Family: Rey Fénix (brother)

Professional wrestling career
- Ring name(s): Dark Dragon; El Hijo del Cuchillo; Lucha Brother; Penta; Penta El 0M; Penta El Cero Miedo; Penta El Zero; Penta El Zero M Penta El Zero Miedo; Penta Oscuro; Pentagón Dark; Pentagón El 0M; Pentagón Jr. Zaius
- Billed height: 5 ft 11 in (180 cm)
- Billed weight: 87 kg (192 lb)
- Billed from: Ecatepec, Mexico; Mexico City, Mexico; Xalapa, Veracruz, Mexico
- Trained by: Gran Apache; Skayde
- Debut: 2007

Pentagón Jr. (born February 5, 1985) is a Mexican professional wrestler. As of January 2025, he is signed to WWE, where he performs on the Raw brand under the ring name Penta. He is the current holder of the men’s Money in the Bank contract and one-half of the World Tag Team Champions alongside Je'Von Evans in their first reign.

Pentagón's career started in México in 2007. In 2010, he began to work with Lucha Libre AAA Worldwide (AAA), where he is a former Latin American Champion, Mixed Tag Team Champion, World Tag Team Championship and the 2016 Rey de Reyes. From 2014 to 2018, he starred in Lucha Underground, a professional wrestling TV series where he is a former Gift of The Gods Champion and Lucha Underground Champion. This led to him and his brother to work for more promotions in the United States. The following year, he worked for Consejo Mundial de Lucha Libre (CMLL), Impact Wrestling, Pro Wrestling Guerrilla and Major League Wrestling among other promotions, winning several tag team titles. He also won the Impact World Championship and the Lucha Underground Championship.

From 2019 to 2024, Pentagón worked in All Elite Wrestling (AEW) and Ring of Honor (ROH) with his brother also as part of the Death Triangle stable with Pac, where he became AEW World Trios Champion, AEW World Tag Team Champion, and ROH World Tag Team Champion. He signed with WWE in 2025, where he became a one-time WWE Intercontinental Champion, and won the men's Money in the Bank contract.

== Early life ==
Pentagón Jr. was born on February 5th, 1985, in Ecatepec de Morelos, State of Mexico. It is unclear exactly how many brothers and sisters he has, but he has a younger brother who is also a professional wrestler, best known under the ring name Rey Fénix.

== Professional wrestling career ==
=== Early career (2007–2010) ===
As the man behind the Pentagón Jr. mask has never been unmasked in the ring, not much is known about his previous history beyond what has been revealed by the man himself, which is traditional in lucha libre, a professional wrestling style originally from Mexico. According to Pentagón Jr. he was trained by Skayde, and made his debut in 2007. His first verified match was on April 9, 2008, where Zaius teamed up with Black Star, losing to his brothers who wrestled as the masked characters Máscara Oriental and El Niño de Fuego. He won his first ever championship on July 26, 2009, when he defeated Mesalla to win the WCW Intercontinental Championship in a Luchas de Apuestas ("bet match") where Zaius put his mask on the line. Records are unclear on if or when he lost the championship.

=== Lucha Libre AAA Worldwide (2010–2017) ===
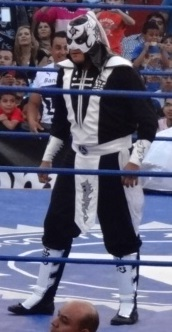
Pentagón, Jr. at Rey de Reyes (2013)

Still working as Zaius the future Pentagón Jr. worked a dark match try out for AAA on September 9, 2010, teaming with Pesadilla to defeat the team of Konami and Máscara Oriental. In 2011 he began working for AAA on a regular basis, using the name "Dark Dragon", while also working on the independent circuit as Zaius. As Dark Dragon he joined AAA's mid-level rudo (Note: A rudo, referred to as a "Heel" in English, are those who portray the bad guys in pro wrestling.) group La Milicia. At the same time as he was given the "Dark Dragon" persona his brother then known as Máscara Oriental, was given a new name and mask, becoming known as Fénix.

On December 2, 2012, the Dark Dragon persona was abandoned and AAA reintroduced him as Pentagón Jr. at their major year-end show Guerra de Titanes ("War of the Titans"). He was introduced as the arch-enemy of the newly introduced Octagón Jr., just like the original Pentagón had been the storyline arch-enemy of Octagón. Octagón, Octagón Jr. and La Parka defeated Pentagón Jr., La Parka Negra and Silver Cain. Since several wrestler who held the name Pentagon had bad luck in their careers, there is the legend of the name Pentagon being cursed. Pentagón Jr.'s catchphrase, Cero Miedo (Zero Fear) was created to show no fear to the curse. By mid-2013 Octagón Jr. left AAA, leaving Pentagón Jr. without any direction or storyline. On August 18 at Héroes Inmortales VII, Pentagón entered the 2013 Copa Antonio Peña, but was defeated in the first round by El Hijo del Fantasma. On March 16, 2014, at AAA's Rey de Reyes show, Pentagón Jr. participated in an eight-man Lucha de Apuestas Domo de la Muerte ("Dome of Death" bet match), but escaped the cage before the end, keeping his mask safe. At Triplemanía XXII, held on August 17, Pentagón Jr participated in a unification match for both the AAA Fusión Championship and AAA Cruiserweight Championship in a multi-man match that was won by El Hijo del Fantasma. On November 17, Pentagón Jr. joined the Los Perros del Mal stable. On December 7, Pentagón Jr. and his new stablemate Joe Líder won the AAA World Tag Team Championship by defeating Los Güeros del Cielo (Angélico and Jack Evans) and Myzteziz and Fénix in a three-way match. They lost the title back to Angélico and Evans on October 4, 2015, at Héroes Inmortales IX.

On March 23, 2016, Pentagón Jr. won the 2016 Rey de Reyes tournament by defeating La Parka and Villano IV. The Rey de Reyes victory was used to build him up as a challenger for the AAA Latin American Championship, which culminated with Pentagón Jr. defeating then-champion Psycho Clown on July 3. At Triplemanía XXIV, on August 28, Pentagón Jr. lost the championship to Johnny Mundo. Pentagón later lost a rematch to Mundo on January 20, 2017 at the Guerra de Titanes. The following day, Pentagón announced that he no longer worked for AAA, citing unhappiness from feeling restricted and held back by AAA.

=== Lucha Underground (2014–2018) ===
In August 2014, Pentagón was announced as one of five AAA wrestlers to star in Lucha Underground, a new American television series on El Rey. Pentagón debuted on the third episode on November 12, where he was defeated by his brother, Fénix, in a three-way, that also included Drago. Over the next weeks, the two real-life brothers developed a storyline rivalry between them. On February 4, 2015, Pentagón started a storyline about him breaking his opponent's arms; dedicating each broken arm as a sacrifice for his unknown master. On April 1, 2015, Pentagon participated in a tournament to crown the first LU Trios Champions. Pentagon, Sexy Star and Super Fly were defeated by Big Ryck, The Mack and Killshot. After the match, Pentagon attempted to break Super Fly's arm, but Star saved him. On April 8, 2015, Pentagon attacked Star and Super Fly, managing to break Super Fly's arm. On April 22, 2015, Pentagón was defeated by Sexy Star. On June 3, 2015, Pentagon defeated Sexy Star in a submission match. After the match, Pentagon attempted to sacrifice Sexy Star but was stopped by commentator Vampiro. Afterwards, Pentagón began attacking Vampiro, saying he would sacrifice him for his master. During Ultima Lucha on August 5, 2015, Pentagón Jr. defeated Vampiro in a violent Cero Miedo match. After the match, at Vampiro's urging, Pentagón Jr. broke Vampiro's arm. Vampiro then revealed he was Pentagón Jr.'s master.

On the season two premiere on January 27, Pentagón attacked reigning Lucha Underground Champion, Mil Muertes following his successful defense against Ivelisse and broke Muertes' arm, turning face in the process. Pentagón unsuccessfully challenged for the Lucha Underground Championship against Matanza Cueto, the story-line monster heel brother of authority figure Dario Cueto in 2015. This match aired via tape delay on March 30, 2016. At Ultima Lucha Dos on January 31, 2016, Pentagón took on the name "Pentagón Dark" after receiving further "training" from Vampiro in an attempt to once again challenge Matanza Cueto for the Lucha Underground Championship. After his bid to capture the title failed, he turned on Vampiro.

At Aztec Warfare III Pentagón was attacked by Black Lotus (who swore revenge on Pentagón for breaking her arm at Ultima Lucha Dos) along with Members of The Black Lotus Triad Hitokiri, Doku and Yurei and was eliminated by Johnny Mundo. Two weeks later he faced the Black Lotus triad members in a gauntlet match in a losing effort and got his arm broken by Black Lotus and El Dragon Azteca Jr, who also swore revenge on Pentagón for breaking his arm. On June 25 at Ultima Lucha Tres, Pentagón Dark defeated Son of Havoc in a ladder match to win the vacant Gift of the Gods Championship, which also earned him a future shot at the Lucha Underground Championship. He cashed in his shot the following day and defeated Prince Puma in a "Loser Must Retire" match to become the new Lucha Underground Champion.

On June 13, 2018, Lucha Underground aired the first episode of the 4th season. At the first episode, Pentagón Dark won the Aztec Warfare to retain the title. Becoming the first person to ever do so.

=== Pro Wrestling Guerrilla (2015–2019) ===
On August 28, 2015, Pentagón Jr. made his debut for Pro Wrestling Guerrilla (PWG) by entering the 2015 Battle of Los Angeles tournament, defeating Drago in his first round match. He was eliminated from the tournament in his second round match two days later by eventual tournament winner Zack Sabre Jr. On September 2, 2016, Pentagón Jr. returned to PWG, entering the 2016 Battle of Los Angeles, from which he was eliminated in the first round by Marty Scurll. Two days later, Pentagón Jr. and Fénix unsuccessfully challenged The Young Bucks (Matt Jackson and Nick Jackson) for the PWG World Tag Team Championship.

On March 18, 2017, Penta el 0M and Rey Fénix defeated The Young Bucks and the team of Matt Sydal and Ricochet in a three-way match to win the PWG World Tag Team Championship. On October 20, Penta and Fénix were booked to lose the championship to The Chosen Bros (Jeff Cobb and Matt Riddle), ending their reign at 216 days.

=== Independent circuit (2015–2019) ===
With the debut of Lucha Underground on American television, Pentagón Jr. began getting work on the US independent circuit, working for various promotions when his AAA schedule would allow it. He began working for a variety of promotions in Latin America and the United States.

On July 23, 2016, Pentagón Jr. defeated Sami Callihan to win AAW: Professional Wrestling Redefined's Heavyweight Championship. On October 8, 2016, Pentagón Jr. put the championship on the line in a Lucha de Apuestas tag team match where his brother Fénix put his mask on the line, while their opponent risked either their hair (Callihan) or their career (Jake Crist). The match ended when Callihan pinned Pentagón Jr. to regain the championship.

During a January 21, 2017, show for The Crash Lucha Libre promotion, Pentagón Jr., Daga and Garza Jr. all came to the ring and later confirmed that they had left AAA. Since AAA owned the trademark to the name Pentagón Jr., he revealed that he would be known as "Penta el 0M" ("Cero Miedo", "Zero Fear"). The three hoped to able to use the Perros del Mal name on the independent circuit, but were unable to obtain the right and on January 24, Penta announced he was leaving Perros del Mal. On January 27, Penta, Daga, Garza and Fénix el Rey announced the formation of a new stable in The Crash, named La Rebelión ("The Rebellion").

On September 1, 2018, Penta El Zero lost to Kenny Omega at the independent wrestling super show All In. Following the match, the lights went dark and when they came on Chris Jericho, dressed as Pentagon, attacked Omega before removing his mask to reveal himself.

=== Major League Wrestling (2018–2019) ===
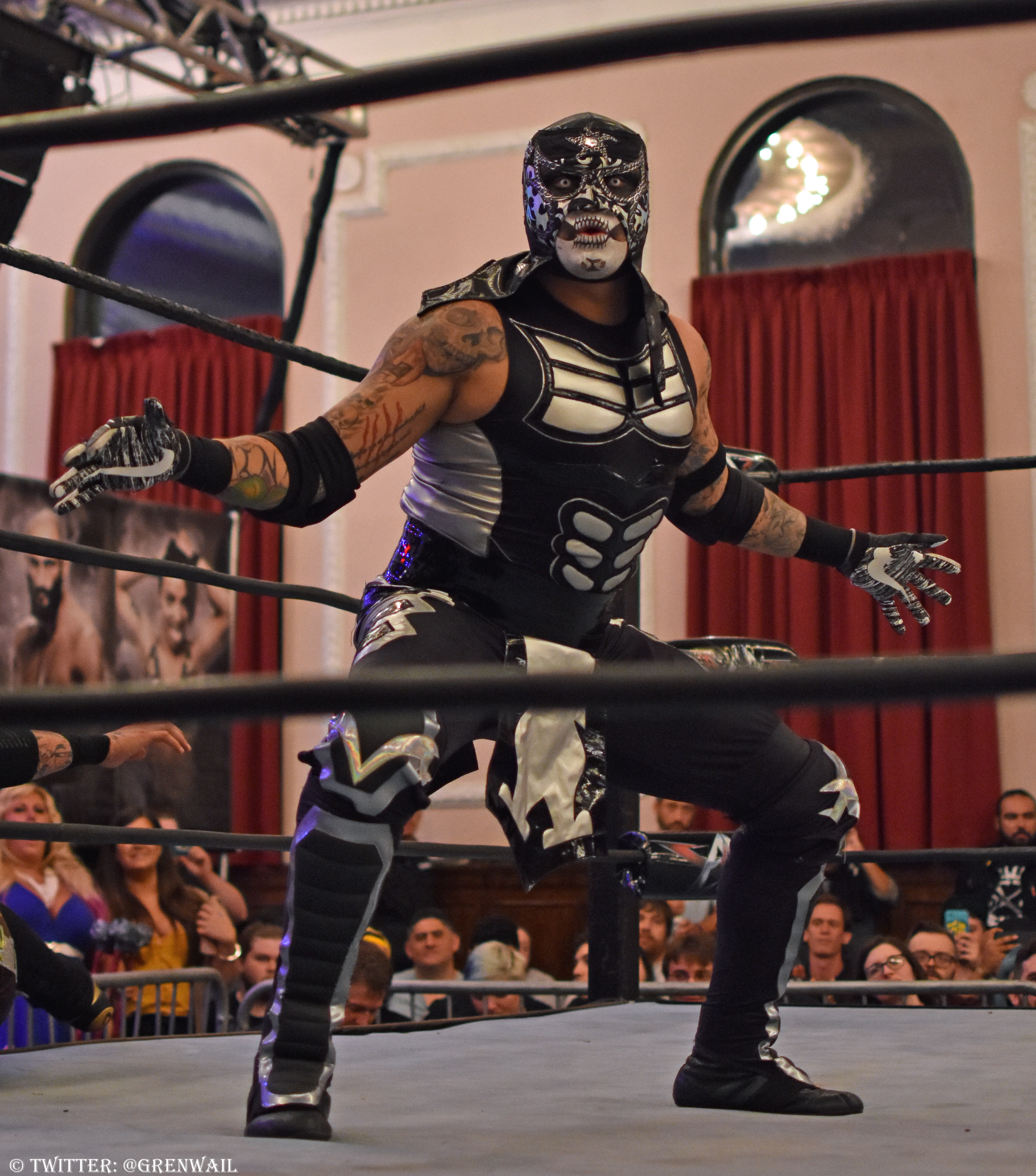
Pentagon in August 2018

Penta 0M made his debut for the U.S. based Major League Wrestling (MLW) on January 11, 2018, where he defeated his brother Rey Fénix as part of MLW's "Zero Hour" show. This was taped for the April 20, 2018 debut episode of MLW Fusion on BeIN Sports. He later earned a match for Shane Strickland's MLW World Heavyweight Championship, but lost the match. The following month Los Lucha Bros (Pentagon and Fenix) defeated "Team TBD" (Jason Cade and Jimmy Yuta) and The Dirty Blondes (Leo Brien and Mike Patrick) to become the first holders of the MLW World Tag Team Championship in the restarted MLW. The long-running rivalry between Penta 0M and L.A. Park also became part of the storyline in MLW, leading to L.A. Park defeating Pentagon in a "Mexican Massacre" No disqualification match on September 9, 2018. The Mexican Massacre match was selected as the "MLW Match of the Year" for 2018. At MLW Fightland, held on November 8, 2018, Los Lucha Bros successfully defended the MLW World Tag Team Championship against L.A. Park and his son El Hijo de L.A. Park.

Following his feud with Park, Lucha Bros began feuding with the Hart Foundation (Teddy Hart, Davey Boy Smith Jr. and Brian Pillman Jr.) over the MLW Tag Team Championship. On the January 4, 2019 episode of MLW Fusion Pentagon lost to Teddy Hart The team held the titles until February 2, 2019, when they lost the MLW Tag Team Championship to The Hart Foundation (Teddy Hart and Davey Boy Smith Jr.). Penta and Fenix appeared at MLW's next event, Intimidation Games, which took place on March 2, 2019.

=== Impact Wrestling (2018–2019) ===
Pentagón Jr. debuted with Impact Wrestling at an "Impact Wrestling vs Lucha Underground" co-promoted event at WrestleCon on April 6, 2018, winning a three-way match against Fénix and Impact World Champion Austin Aries. It was subsequently announced that he would face Fénix in a singles match at Redemption on April 22. However, following Alberto El Patron's dismissal from the promotion, Pentagón Jr. and Fénix were announced as his replacement in the main event, this time for the Impact World Championship. Pentagón Jr. pinned Aries to win the championship. Two nights later at Impact Wrestling's television tapings, Pentagón Jr. successfully defended the championship against Eli Drake, which aired on May 10. He also lost the championship to Aries at the tapings, which aired as part of the Under Pressure special episode on May 31.

He also entered a feud with Sami Callihan after Callihan attempted to remove Pentagón Jr.'s mask after attacking him with a baseball bat. At Slammiversary XVI, Pentagón Jr defeated Callihan in a "mask vs. hair" match; per the stipulation, he proceeded to shave Callihan's hair. At Bound for Glory on October 14, Pentagón, Brian Cage and Fénix lost to Ohio Versus Everything (Dave Crist, Jake Crist and Callihan) in a oVe Rules match.

On the February 8 episode of Impact, The Lucha Bros defeated The Latin American Xchange (Santana and Ortiz) for the Impact World Tag Team Championship. At Rebellion on April 28, they lost the titles back to LAX in a Full Metal Mayhem match. On the May 3 episode of Impact, Penta competed in a 3-way #1 contender's match for the World title but lost. Afterwards Penta left TNA.

=== Return to AAA (2018–2023) ===
On June 5, 2018, it was announced that Pentagón Jr. was returning to AAA, participating in AAA's Poker de Ases ("Poker Aces") match at Triplemanía XXVI, putting his mask on the line against Psycho Clown, El Hijo del Fantasma and L.A. Park. On August 2, Pentagon and L.A. Park defeated Psycho Clown and Pagano.

=== Consejo Mundial de Lucha Libre (2018–2019, 2024) ===
In the spring of 2018 Penta El 0M wrestled against Carístico on the Mexican independent circuit, after which he threatened Carístico that he would "visit Carístico's home", making references to the Consejo Mundial de Lucha Libre promotion. On June 29, 2018, Penta El 0M made a surprise appearance during the main event of CMLL's Super Viernes show, attacking Carístico during the match.

It was announced in July 2024 that Pentagón Jr. and Death Triangle stable-mates Pac and Fénix would be making their debut as a stable for CMLL on the July 27 Super Viernes show. At the show, Pentagón was announced under the ring name Lucha Brother, while Fénix was announced as King. Death Triangle were defeated by Místico, Mascara Dorada and Volador Jr. by disqualification in a six-man tag team match.

=== All Elite Wrestling / Ring of Honor (2019–2024) ===
During an independent circuit show in Georgia on February 1, 2019, The Young Bucks came to the ring to offer the Lucha Brothers an All Elite Wrestling (AEW) contract in a confrontation that ended with a verbal agreement and a handshake. It was subsequently revealed that Pentagon Jr. and Rey Fénix had agreed to a non-exclusive deal with AEW, due to their legal obligations to Lucha Underground. They debuted at the Double or Nothing pay-per-view on May 25, challenging The Young Bucks for the AAA World Tag Team Championship in a losing effort. They won back the titles in a rematch organized by AAA on June 16 at Verano de Escándalo.

On March 4, 2020, the Lucha Brothers formed a trio along with Pac on Dynamite known as Death Triangle. In August 2021, the Lucha Brothers took part in a four-team eliminator tournament for a shot at the AEW World Tag Team Championship, with the winners facing The Young Bucks at All Out in a steel cage match, defeating the Varsity Blonds and Jurassic Express to become number one contenders. At All Out on September 5, they defeated the Young Bucks to win the AEW World Tag Team Championship for the first time. The match was widely praised by critics as one of the greatest steel cage matches of all time, and one of the best matches in AEW's history. On the October 16 episode of Dynamite, Penta and Fenix lost their AAA World Tag Team Championship to FTR, who were disguised as the fictitious luchador tag team Las Super Ranas. They lost the AEW World Tag Team Championship to Jurassic Express on the January 5, 2022 episode of Dynamite.

On the February 23 episode of Dynamite, he and Pac defeated the Kings of the Black Throne (Brody King and Malakai Black). Prior to the match, he was accompanied to the ring by Alex Abrahantes, carried a shovel, donned a black hood with a full black ring attire and debuted the name "Penta Oscuro" (Dark Penta), a callback to his Lucha Underground gimmick "Pentagon Dark". At Revolution's buy-in show on March 6, Oscuro and Pac teamed with Erick Redbeard in a trios match against the House of Black (now completed with Buddy Matthews), which they lost. On the September 7 episode of Dynamite, Penta, Pac and Fénix defeated Best Friends to win the recently vacated AEW World Trios Championship. The trio made their first title defense on the October 7 episode of Rampage, defeating The Dark Order. At Full Gear on November 19, they successfully defended the titles against The Elite. This led to a best of seven series which culminated on the January 11, 2023 episode of Dynamite, where The Elite defeated Death Triangle in a ladder match to become the new trios champions, ending their reign at 126 days.

In early 2023, the Lucha Brothers began appearing for AEW's sister promotion, Ring of Honor (ROH). At Supercard of Honor on March 31, the Lucha Brothers defeated Top Flight (Dante and Darius Martin), The Kingdom (Matt Taven and Mike Bennett), Aussie Open (Kyle Fletcher and Mark Davis) and La Facción Ingobernable (Rush and Dralístico) in a "Reach for the Sky" ladder match to win the vacant ROH World Tag Team Championship. At Double or Nothing on May 28, both Pentagon and Fenix competed in the Blackjack Battle Royale for the AEW International Championship but were unsuccessful. On July 21, at Death Before Dishonor, the Lucha Brothers lost the ROH World Tag Team Championship to Aussie Open in a four-way tag team match. At All In on August 27, Pentagon, Best Friends and Eddie Kingston defeated the Blackpool Combat Club and Santana and Ortiz in a Stadium Stampede match. At Double or Nothing on May 26, 2024, Death Triangle unsuccessfully challenged the Bang Bang Gang for the AEW World Trios Championship.

On the July 19 (taped July 17) episode of Rampage, Pentagon and Fenix defeated Private Party, which wound up being his final appearance in AEW. On December 1, Pentagon's contract with AEW expired, ending his five-year tenure with the promotion.

=== WWE (2025–present) ===
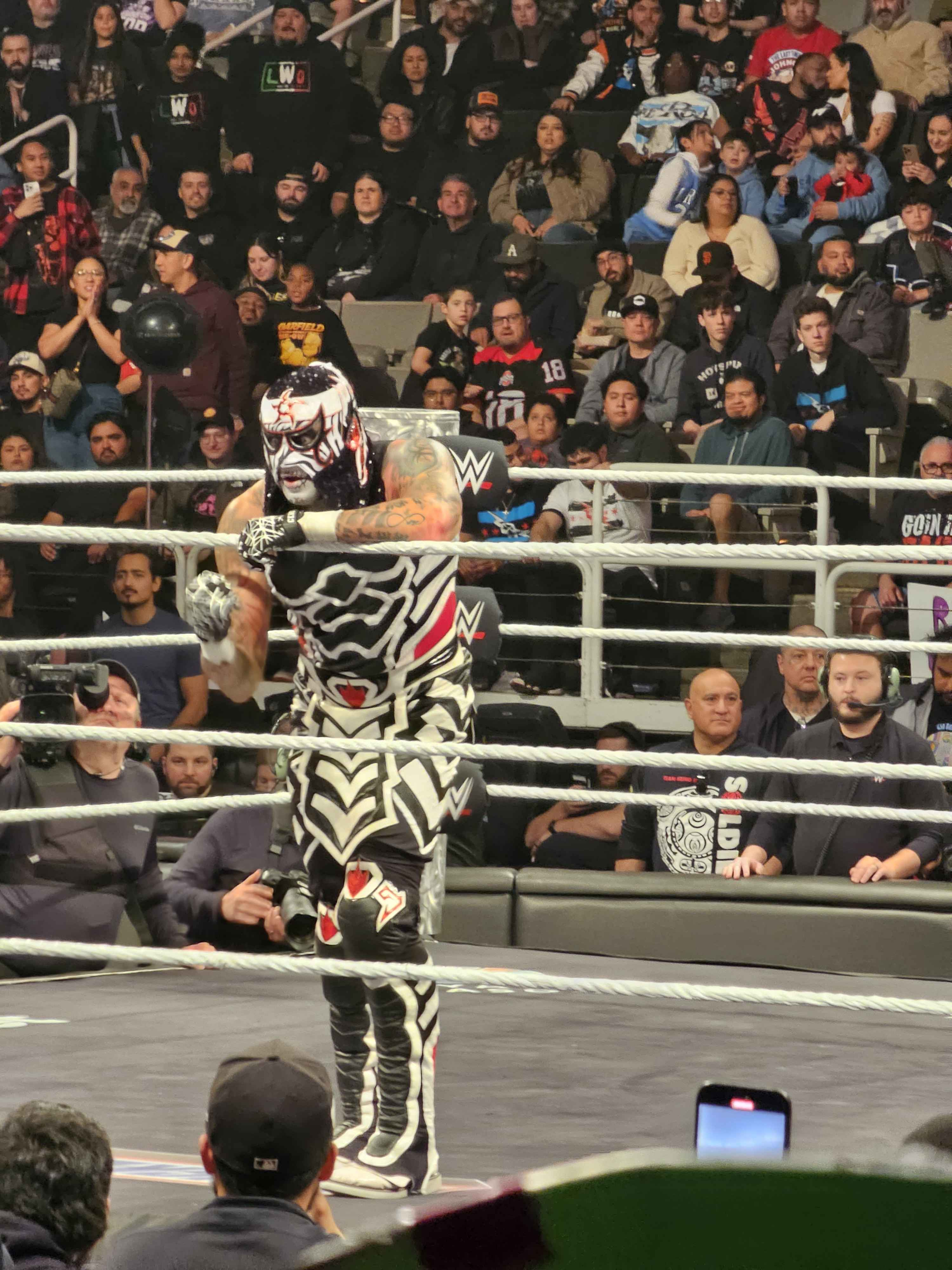
Penta following his WWE debut in January 2025

At the Raw premiere on Netflix on January 6, 2025, a video aired teasing Pentagón's debut in WWE. The following week on Raw, he made his official WWE debut under the ring name Penta, defeating Chad Gable. Within his first year with WWE, Penta appeared in several major events, including the Royal Rumble where he earned the distinction of spending the longest time in the match, wrestled for the WWE Intercontinental Championship at WrestleMania 41 and Backlash, and competed in the Money in the Bank ladder match.

Penta won the Intercontinental Championship from Dominik Mysterio on the March 2, 2026 episode of Raw, becoming the first Mexican-born professional wrestler to win this title. On April 19 at WrestleMania 42, Penta successfully defended the Intercontinental Championship in a Six-Man Ladder match against Rey Mysterio, Rusev, Dragon Lee, Je'Von Evans and JD McDonagh. Penta lost the title to Gable on Night 2 of Summerslam, ending his reign at 153 days.

After SummerSlam, Penta won a tournament, facing Roman Reigns for the World Heavyweight Championship on the Raw in Mexico City special episode on September 14. and winning the Money in the Bank Ladder match on October 10. On November 7 at Crown Jewel, Penta and Je'Von Evans won the World Tag Team Championship by defeating The Vision’s Bron Breakker and Austin Theory.

== Personal life ==
Pentagón has three daughters.

Pentagón shares a close friendship with George Kittle. Kittle frequently incorporates Penta's signature "Cero Miedo" (Spanish for "No Fear" or "Zero Fear") taunt into his NFL celebrations.

Pentagón opened his own lucha libre wrestling school in Mexico in 2020, and he also owns a carnitas restaurant called "Chanchos Beer", located in Teotihuacán de Arista, State of Mexico, inaugurated in 2024.

== Championships and accomplishments ==
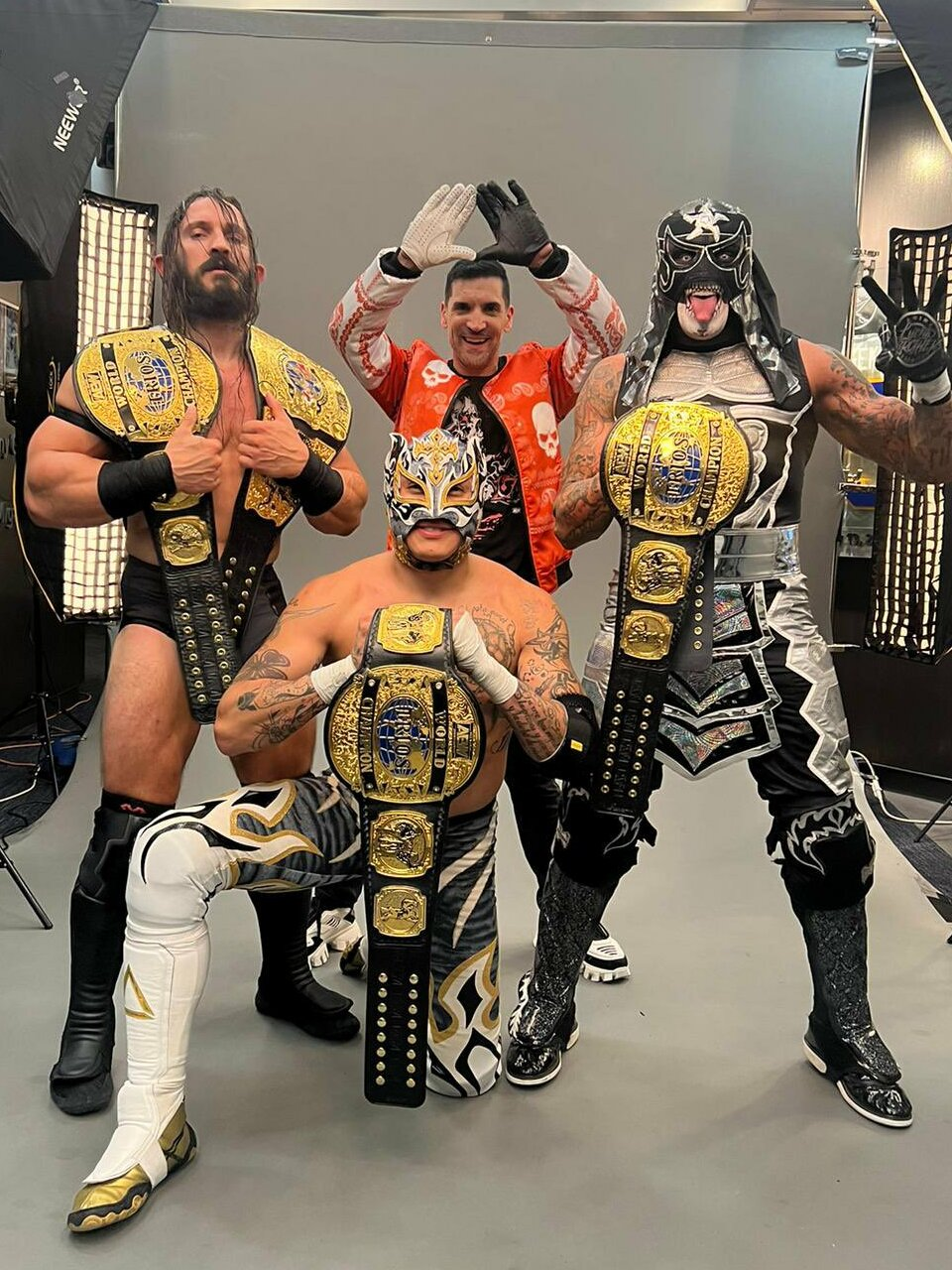
Penta El Zero Miedo as part of Death Triangle, the holders of the AEW World Trios Championship in 2023

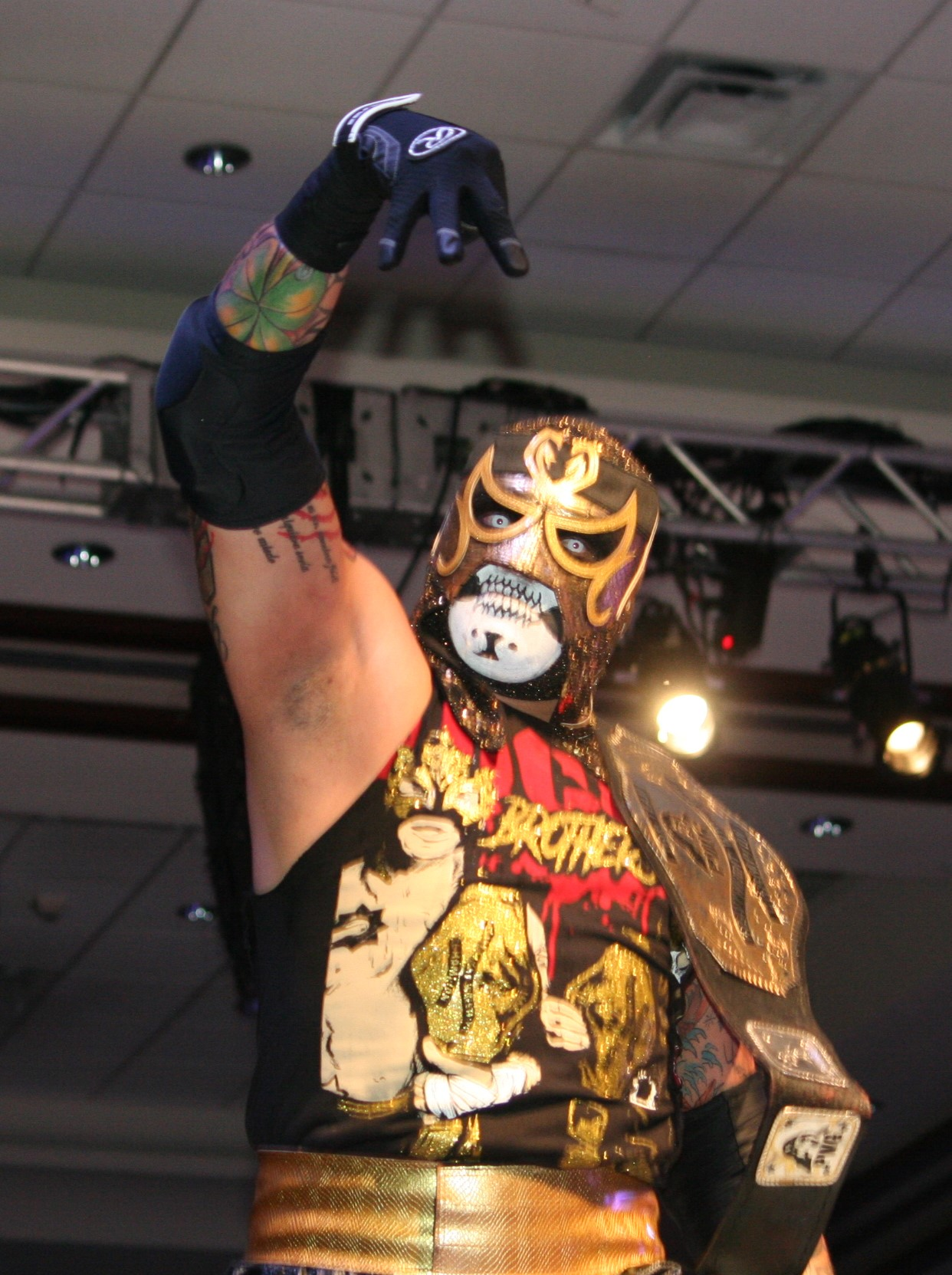
Pentagón Jr. as PWG Tag Team Champion in 2017

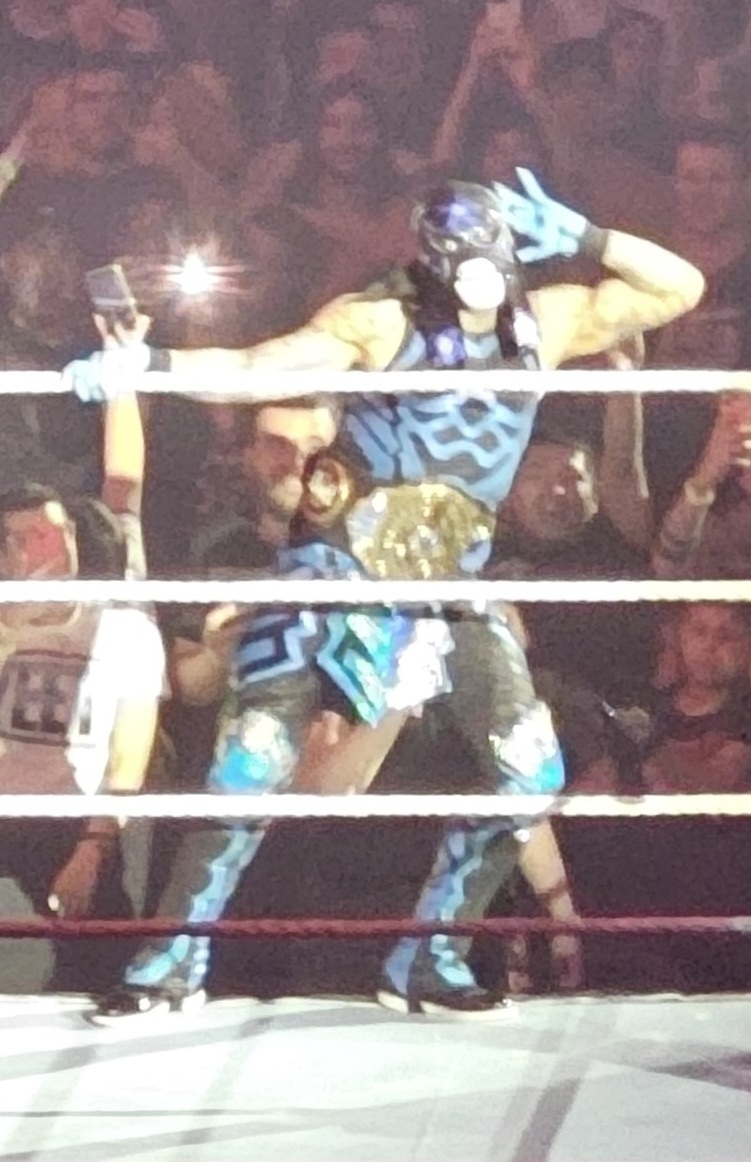
Penta as the WWE Intercontinental Champion in 2026

- All Elite Wrestling
  - AEW World Tag Team Championship (1 time) – with Rey Fénix
  - AEW World Trios Championship (1 time) – with Pac and Rey Fénix
  - AEW World Tag Team Championship Eliminator Tournament (2021) – with Rey Fénix
- AAW Wrestling
  - AAW Heavyweight Championship (1 time)
  - AAW Heritage Championship (1 time)
  - AAW Tag Team Championship (1 time) – with Rey Fénix
  - Fifth Triple Crown Champion
- CBS Sports
  - Tag Team of the Year (2019) – with Fénix
- The Crash Lucha Libre
  - The Crash Cruiserweight Championship (1 time)
  - The Crash Tag Team Championship (1 time) – with The King
- House of Glory
  - HOG Tag Team Championship (1 time) – with Fénix
- Impact Wrestling
  - Impact World Championship (1 time)
  - Impact World Tag Team Championship (1 time) – with Fénix
  - Impact Year End Awards (2 times)
    - Finisher of the Year (2018) – Pentagon Driver
    - Match of the Year (2018) vs. Sami Callihan at Slammiversary XVI
- Lucha Libre AAA Worldwide
  - AAA Latin American Championship (1 time)
  - AAA World Mixed Tag Team Championship (1 time) – with Sexy Star
  - AAA World Tag Team Championship (3 times) – with Joe Líder (1) and Fénix (2)
  - Lucha Fighter (Men 2020)
  - Rey de Reyes (2016)
  - Ruleta de la Muerte (2022)
  - Lucha Libre World Cup: 2023 Men's division – with Laredo Kid and Taurus
  - Rudo of the Year (2014, 2015)
  - Wrestler of the Year (2015)
- Lucha Underground
  - Gift of the Gods Championship (1 time)
  - Lucha Underground Championship (2 times)
  - Aztec Warfare IV
- Major League Wrestling
  - MLW World Tag Team Championship (1 time) – with Rey Fénix
- Perros del Mal Producciones
  - Perros del Mal Light Heavyweight Championship (2 times)
- PCW Ultra
  - PCW Heavyweight Championship (2 times)
- Pro Wrestling Guerrilla
  - PWG World Tag Team Championship (1 time) – with Rey Fénix
- Pro Wrestling Illustrated
  - Ranked No. 23 of the top 500 singles wrestlers in the PWI 500 in 2026
- Ring of Honor
  - ROH World Tag Team Championship (1 time) – with Rey Fénix
- Robles Promotions
  - Robles Heavyweight Championship (1 time)
- Wrestling Alliance Revolution
  - WAR World Tag Team Championship (1 time, final) – with Rey Fénix
- Wrestling Superstar
  - Wrestling Superstar World Submission Lucha Championship (1 time)
- Xtreme Mexican Wrestling
  - XMW Tag Team Championship (1 time) – with Fénix
- Mexican independent circuit
  - WCW Intercontinental Championship (1 time)
- Wrestling Observer Newsletter
  - Tag Team of The Year (2019) – with Rey Fénix
  - Pro Wrestling Match of the Year (2021) – with Rey Fénix vs. the Young Bucks at All Out
- WWE
  - WWE Intercontinental Championship (1 time)
  - World Tag Team Championship (1 time, current) – with Je'Von Evans
  - World Heavyweight Championship No. 1 Contender's Tournament (2026)
  - Men's Money in the Bank (2026)

== Luchas de Apuestas record ==
Winner (wager)	Loser (wager)	Location	Event	Date	Notes
Zaius (mask)	Mesalla (championship)	San Cristóbal Ecatepec de Morelos, Mexico State	BJC Show	July 26, 2009	
Sami Callihan (hair)	Pentagón Jr. (championship)	Berwyn, Illinois	Jim Lynam Memorial Tournament – Day 2	October 8, 2016	(Note: This was a tag team match, where Callihan and Jake Crist defeated Pentagón Jr. and Rey Fénix with Callihan winning the AAW Heavyweight Championship. Crist's career and Fénix's mask were also on the line.)
Pentagón Jr. (mask)	Sami Callihan (hair)	Toronto, Ontario, Canada	Slammiversary XVI	July 22, 2018	
Pentagón Jr. (mask)	Villano IV (mask)	Mexico City, Mexico	Triplemanía XXX	October 15, 2022	(Note: Finals of a Ruleta de la Muerte tournament.)
