= HOG Crown Jewel Championship =

Men's professional wrestling championship

Details
- Promotion: House Of Glory
- Date established: December 11, 2015
- Current champion: Amazing Red

Other names
- HOG Crown Jewel Championship (2015, 2016–present); HOG Elite Championship (2015–2016)
Statistics
- First champion: Ken Broadway
- Most reigns: Ken Broadway, Anthony Gangone, Zilla Fatu (2 reigns)
- Longest reign: TJP (727 days)
- Shortest reign: Ken Broadway (<1 days)

The HOG Crown Jewel Championship is a men's professional wrestling championship created and promoted by the American promotion House of Glory (HOG). It serves as one of the promotion's two men's midcard championships, the other being the HOG Cruiserweight Championship. The current champion is Amazing Red, who is in his first reign.

== History ==
On December 11, 2015, Ken Broadway became the inaugural champion. That same night, the championship's name was changed to the HOG Elite Championship. On August 19, 2016, the championship name reverted back to being the HOG Crown Jewel Championship.

== Reigns ==
=== Names ===
Name	Years
HOG Crown Jewel Championship	December 11, 2015 – December 11, 2015; August 19, 2016 – present
HOG Elite Championship	December 11, 2015 – August 19, 2016

Key
No.	Overall reign number
Reign	Reign number for the specific champion
Days	Number of days held
+	Current reign is changing daily

No.	Champion	Championship change			Reign statistics		Notes	Ref.
No.	Champion	Date	Event	Location	Reign	Days	Notes	Ref.
1	Ken Broadway	December 11, 2015	HOG Civil War	Jamaica, NY	1	<1	Broadway was billed as champion on December 11, 2015 at the HOG Civil War event. The circumstances under which he won the title are unknown.	
2	Anthony Gangone	December 11, 2015	HOG Civil War	Jamaica, NY	1	252	This was a four-way match also involving Joey Janela and J. T. Dunn. The championship's name was changed to HOG Elite Championship at the event.	
3	Ken Broadway	August 19, 2016	HOG High Intensity 5	Jamaica, NY	2	281	This was a No ropes match with Leroy Green serving as a special guest referee. The championship's name was reverted back to the HOG Crown Jewel Championship.	
4	Lio Rush	May 27, 2017	HOG Adrenaline	New York City, NY	1	35		
5	Anthony Gangone	July 1, 2017	HOG Never Trust A Snake	New York City, NY	2	90	This was a Winner takes all match also disputed for Gangone's HOG Heavyweight Championship.	
6	Leroy Green	September 29, 2017	HOG Chapter Two	New York City, NY	1	22	This was a three-way match also involving Ken Broadway.	
7	Evander James	October 21, 2017	HOG Glory Of War	New York City, NY	1	231		
8	Sami Callihan	June 9, 2018	HOG Temperature Rising	New York City, NY	1	189		
—	Vacated	December 15, 2018	HOG 8	New York City, NY	—	—	Sami Callihan relinquished the title.	
9	Mantequilla	December 15, 2018	HOG 8	New York City, NY	1	336	Defeated Evander James to win the vacant title.	
10	TJP	November 16, 2019	House show	N/A, N/A, United States	1	727		
11	Low Ki	November 12, 2021	HOG Born Again	New York City, NY	1	154	This was a three-way match also involving Charles Mason.	
12	Charles Mason	April 15, 2022	HOG Tribulations	New York City, NY	1	595		
13	Carlos Ramirez	December 1, 2023	HOG The Darkest Hour	New York City, NY	1	238	This was a falls count anywhere match.	
14	Zilla Fatu	July 26, 2024	HOG High Intensity 2024	New York City, NY	1	371		
15	Bully Ray	August 1, 2025	HOG High Intensity 2024	New York City, NY	1	34	This was a tables match.	
16	Zilla Fatu	September 4, 2025	HOG Philadelphia	Philadelphia, Pennsylvania	2	338		
17	Amazing Red	August 7, 2026	HOG High Intensity	Jamaica, NY	1	104+		

== Combined reigns ==
As of November 19, 2026, there have been a total of seventeen reigns shared between fourteen champions and one vacancy. Ken Broadway was the inaugural champion, with this reign also being the shortest as he only held it for one day. TJP had the longest reign at 727 days. Broadway, Anthony Gangone, and Zilla Fatu all share the record for most reigns with two each.

Amazing Red is the current champion in his first reign. He won the title by defeating previous champion Zilla Fatu at "HOG High Intensity 2026" in Jamaica, NY on August 7, 2026.

†	Indicates the current champion

Rank	Wrestler	No. of reigns	Combined days
1	TJP	1	727
2	Zilla Fatu	2	709
3	Charles Mason	1	595
4	Anthony Gangone	2	342
5	Mantequilla	1	336
6	Ken Broadway	2	282
7	Carlos Ramirez	1	238
8	Evander James	1	231
9	Sami Callihan	1	189
10	Low Ki	1	154
11	Amazing Red †	1	104+
12	Lio Rush	1	35
13	Bully Ray	1	34
14	Leroy Green	1	22
