= Charles Mason (wrestler) =

American professional wrestler (born 1993)

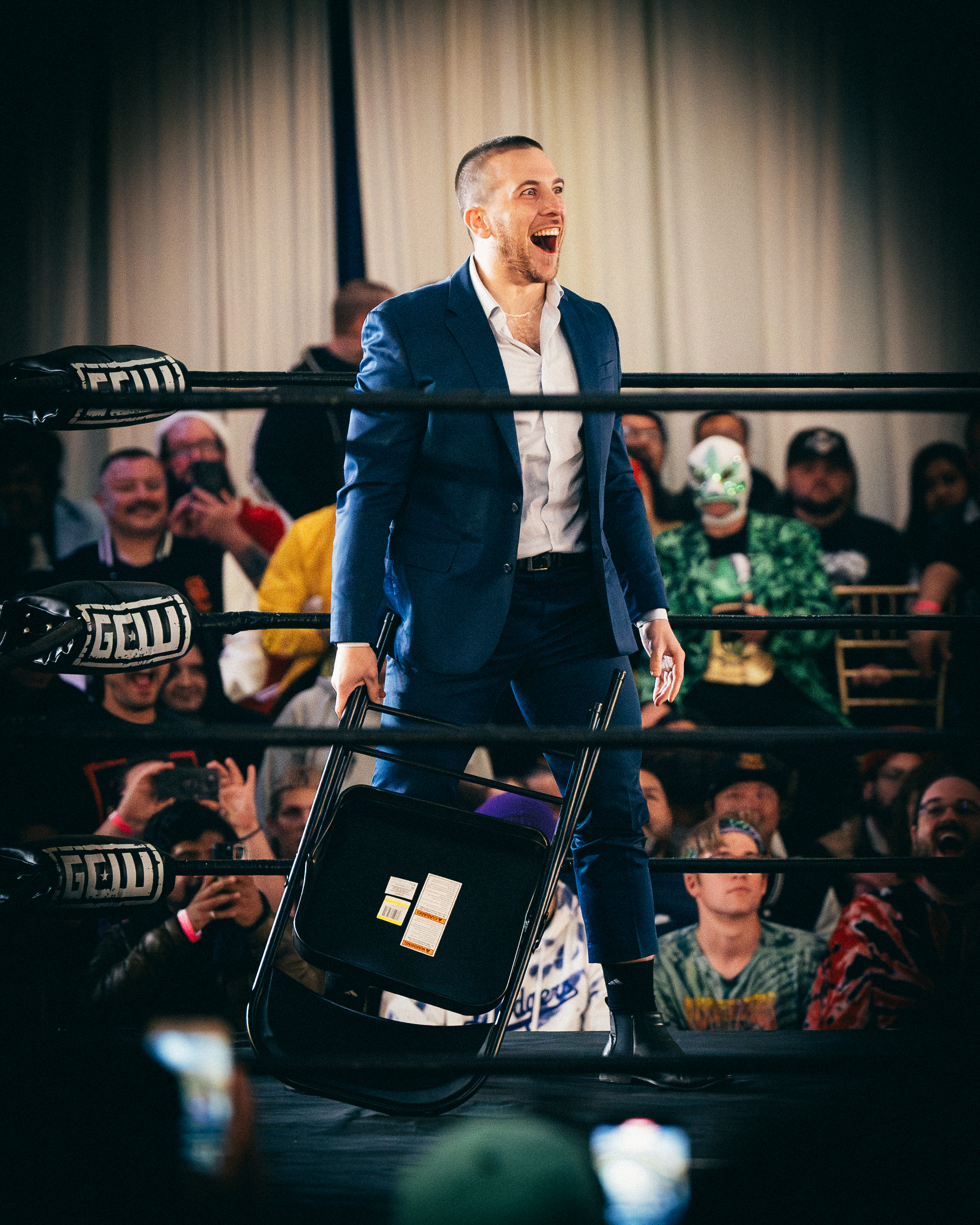
- Mason in April 2025

Personal information
- Born: 27 May 1993 (age 33) Hewlett Bay Park, New York, United States

Professional wrestling career
- Ring name: Charles Mason
- Billed weight: 91 kg (201 lb)
- Billed from: New York City, New York
- Trained by: Amazing Red
- Debut: 2017

Charles Mason (born May 27, 1993) is an American professional wrestler. He performs on the independent circuit as "The Root of All Evil" Charles Mason – predominantly for House of Glory (HOG), Game Changer Wrestling (GCW) and its sister promotion Jersey Championship Wrestling (JCW).

== Personal life ==
Mason was born on May 27, 1993 in Hewlett Bay Park on Long Island. He is half Puerto Rican and half Colombian.

== Professional wrestling career ==
=== House of Glory (2017–present) ===
Mason made his professional wrestling debut in House of Glory at HOG Never Trust A Snake on July 1, 2017, where he competed in a Break The Glass Ceiling Battle Royal won by Leroy Green and also involving Alexander Balcom, Evander James, Ezekiel Lewis, Gabriel Grogan, J. Lyon, Matt Travis, Sasha Jenkins and Thomas Odin.

During his time with the promotion, Mason has won the House of Glory Tag Team Championship, HOG Crown Jewel Championship, HOG Cruiserweight Championship and House of Glory Heavyweight Championship on one occasion each, with the Heavyweight title won at Mike Santana Presents Puerto Rican Weekend on June 7, 2025, in a three-way match also involving Tomohiro Ishii. This also made him the first male wrestler to have won all of the men's titles in HOG.

=== Game Changer Wrestling (2021–present) ===
Mason made his debut in Game Changer Wrestling at GCW Fight Forever: Jimmy Lloyd's Up All Night, a show promoted on January 30, 2021, where he fell short to Ken Broadway in singles competition.

At The Wrld on GCW on January 23, 2022, Mason competed in a Pabst Blue Ribbon Kickoff Battle Royal from which he emerged as the runner-up to Big Vin. The bout also involved Psycho Clown, Dark Sheik, Parrow, B-Boy, Lufisto, Thunder Rosa and others.

He competed in various of the promotion's signature events such as the Jersey J-Cup, tournament in which he made his first appearance at the 2023 edition where he defeated Billie Starkz in the first rounds, then fell short to Jordan Oliver in the quarterfinals. At the 2024 edition, he took part of a Six-way scramble match in the first rounds, bout won by Myron Reed which also involved Mr. Danger, Jack Cartwheel, Cole Radrick and Billie Starkz. At the 2025 edition, Mason competed in another scramble type of bout of the first rounds which was also a number one contendership match for the JCW World Championship won by Sidney Akeem and also involved Fuego Del Sol, Mr. Danger and Terry Yaki.

During his time with the promotion, he chased for various accomplishments. At GCW Cage Of Survival 3 on June 2, 2024, he unsuccessfully challenged for the vacant GCW World Championship by competing in a Gauntlet for survival match won by Joey Janela and also involving Jimmy Lloyd, John Wayne Murdoch, Kasey Catal, 1 Called Manders, Microman, Nick Gage, Shane Mercer and Jordan Oliver.

== Championships and accomplishments ==
- Blitzkrieg! Pro
  - B!P Bedlam Championship (1 time, current)
- Game Changer Wrestling
  - JCW World Championship (1 time)
  - Jersey J-Cup (2026)
- House of Glory
  - House of Glory Heavyweight Championship (1 time)
  - HOG Crown Jewel Championship (1 time)
  - HOG Cruiserweight Championship (1 time, inaugural)
  - House of Glory Tag Team Championship (1 time) – with Jay Armani, Nolo Kitano and Raheem Royal
- Pennsylvania Premiere Wrestling
  - PPW No Limits Championship (1 time)
- Pro Wrestling Illustrated
  - Ranked No. 70 of the top 500 singles wrestlers in the PWI 500 in 2026
- Pro Wrestling Junkie
  - PWJ Championship (1 time, current, inaugural)
