= House of Glory Tag Team Championship =

Wrestling championship

HOG Tag Team Championship
- Current title design

Details
- Promotion: House of Glory
- Date established: November 15, 2013
- Current champions: The Hardys (Matt Hardy and Jeff Hardy)
- Date won: October 10, 2025
Statistics
- First champions: The Young Bucks (Matt Jackson and Nick Jackson)
- Most reigns: A tag team: EYFBO/Latin American Xchange (3 reigns); As individual: Angel Ortiz/Ortiz and Mike Draztik/Santana (3 reigns)
- Longest reign: The Lucha Bros (Pentagón Jr. and Rey Fénix) (1,007 days)
- Shortest reign: The Mane Event (Jay Lyon and Midas Black) (83 days)

The HOG Tag Team Championship is a professional wrestling tag team championship created and promoted by the American promotion House of Glory (HOG). The Young Bucks (Matt Jackson and Nick Jackson) were the inaugural champions.

== Title history ==
The Young Bucks (Matt Jackson and Nick Jackson) were the inaugural champions. The Latin American Xchange (LAX, formerly EYFBO) hold the most reigns, individually and as a team with three and with their third reign being the longest at 598 days. The team of Anthony Gangone and Joey Janela have the shortest at 84 days. The current champions are The Hardys (Matt Hardy and Jeff Hardy), who are in their second reign as a team and individually. They defeated The Mane Event (Jay Lyon and Midas Black) in a Winners Take All match that was also for The Hardys' TNA World Tag Team Championship, at With Glory Comes Pride in New York City, NY on October 10, 2025.

== Reigns ==
Key
No.	Overall reign number
Reign	Reign number for the specific team—reign numbers for the individuals are in parentheses, if different
Days	Number of days held
+	Current reign is changing daily

No.	Champion	Championship change			Reign statistics		Notes	Ref.
No.	Champion	Date	Event	Location	Reign	Days	Notes	Ref.
1	The Young Bucks (Matt Jackson and Nick Jackson)	November 15, 2013	Fight For Gold	Ridgewood, NY	1	182	Defeated Latin American Exchange (Hernandez and Homicide) in a tournament final to become the inaugural champions.	
2	Amazing Red and Crimson	May 16, 2014	High Intensity III	Ridgewood, NY	1	378		
3	Anthony Gangone and Joey Janela	May 29, 2015	High Intensity 4	Jamaica, NY	1	84	This was a three-way tag team match, also including Marq Quen (Replacement for Amazing Red) and EYFBO (Angel Ortiz and Mike Draztik).	
4	EYFBO (Angel Ortiz and Mike Draztik)	August 21, 2015	At Last	Jamaica, NY	1	112		
5	Private Party (Isiah Kassidy and Marq Quen)	December 11, 2015	Civil War	Jamaica, NY	1	252		
6	The Broken Hardys ("Broken" Matt Hardy and Brother Nero)	August 19, 2016	High Intensity 5	Jamaica, NY	1	120		
7	EYFBO (Angel Ortiz and Mike Draztik)	December 17, 2016	HOG VI	Jamaica, NY	2	196	This was a fatal four-way match, also involving The Dudley Boyz and Private Party.	
—	Vacated	July 1, 2017	Never Trust A Snake	Elmhurst, NY	—	—	EYFBO were stripped of the titles when they couldn't defend them due to other commitments.	
8	The New York Wrecking Krew (Smooth Blackmon and Chris Seaton)	July 1, 2017	Never Trust A Snake	Elmhurst, NY	1	168		
—	Vacated	December 16, 2017	Seven	Jamaica, NY	—	—	Rob Blatt stripped The Krew from the titles.	
9	The Latin American Xchange (Ortiz and Santana)	December 16, 2017	Seven	Jamaica, NY	3	598	Defeated The Private Party (Isiah Kassidy and Marq Quen), The House of Gangone and Larger than Life (Brian Burgundy and TJ Marconi) in a "lucha rules" match to win the vacant titles. Previously known as EYFBO.	
10	The Lucha Bros (Pentagón Jr. and Rey Fénix)	August 6, 2019	Temperature Rising 2	Jamaica, NY	1	948		
11	The Briscoes (Jay Briscoe and Mark Briscoe)	March 11, 2022	Salvation	Jamaica, NY	1	281	This was a winner takes all match, where The Briscoes also defends the ROH World Tag Team Championship and Arez was a substitute for Rey Fenix.	
12	The Mane Event (Jay Lyon and Midas Black)	December 17, 2022	Revelations	New York City, NY	1	83	This was a Two out of three falls match.	
13	The Bookers (Amazing Red (2) and Brian XL (1))	March 10, 2023	With Glory Comes Pride	New York City, NY	1	161	This was a No disqualification match.	
12	The Mane Event (Jay Lyon and Midas Black)	August 18, 2023	High Intensity X	New York City, NY	2	343	This was a Steel Cage match.	
13	The Cold Blooded Killers (Charles Mason, Jay Armani, Nolo Kitano and Raheem Royal)	July 26, 2024	High Intensity 2024	New York City, NY	1	232	This was an "I Quit" match. Kitano and Mason won the titles, but Royal and Armani are also recognized as champion under the freebird rule as they actively took part in title defenses.	
14	The Mane Event (Jay Lyon and Midas Black)	March 15, 2025	City of Dreamz	New York City, NY	3	210	This was a Title vs. Career three-on-two handicap two out of three falls match. Kitano, Royal, and Armani represented The Cold-Blooded Killers. The Mane Event won 2–1.	
15	The Hardys (Matt Hardy and Jeff Hardy)	October 10, 2025	With Glory Comes Pride	New York City, NY	2	348+	This was a Winners Take All match, where The Hardys' TNA World Tag Team Championship was also on the line.	

== Combined reigns ==
As of September 23, 2026.

†	Indicates the current champion

=== By team ===
Rank	Team	No. of reigns	Combined days
1	The Lucha Bros (Pentagón Jr. and Rey Fénix)	1	948
2	EYFBO/The Latin American Xchange (Angel Ortiz/Ortiz and Mike Draztik/Santana)	3	906
3	The Mane Event (Jay Lyon and Midas Black)	3	636
4	The Broken Hardys/The Hardys † ("Broken" Matt Hardy/Matt Hardy and Brother Nero/Jeff Hardy)	2	468+
5	Amazing Red and Crimson	1	378
6	The Briscoes (Jay Briscoe and Mark Briscoe)	1	281
7	Private Party (Isiah Kassidy and Marq Quen)	1	252
8	The Cold Blooded Killers (Charles Mason, Jay Armani, Nolo Kitano and Raheem Royal)	1	232
9	The Young Bucks (Matt Jackson and Nick Jackson)	1	182
10	The New York Wrecking Krew (Smooth Blackmon and Chris Seaton)	1	168
11	The Bookers (Amazing Red and Brian XL)	1	161
12	Anthony Gangone and Joey Janela	1	84

=== By wrestler ===
Rank	Wrestler	No. of reigns	Combined days
1	Penta El Zero M	1	948
1	Rey Fenix	1	948
3	Angel Ortiz/Ortiz	3	651
3	Mike Draztik/Santana	3	651
5	Jay Lyon	3	636
5	Midas Black	3	636
7	Amazing Red	2	539
8	Matt Hardy †	2	468+
8	Brother Nero/Jeff Hardy †	2	468+
10	Crimson	1	378
11	Jay Briscoe	1	281
11	Mark Briscoe	1	281
13	Isiah Kassidy	1	252
13	Marq Quen	1	252
15	Charles Mason	1	232
15	Jay Armani	1	232
15	Nolo Kitano	1	232
15	Raheem Royal	1	232
19	Matt Jackson	1	182
19	Nick Jackson	1	182
21	Chris Seaton	1	168
21	Smooth Blackmon	1	168
23	Brian XL	1	161
24	Anthony Gangone	1	84
24	Joey Janela	1	84
