= Bound for Glory (2018) =

2018 Impact Wrestling pay-per-view event

- Promotional poster featuring various Impact wrestlers
- Promotion: Impact Wrestling
- Date: October 14, 2018
- City: Astoria, Queens, New York
- Venue: Melrose Ballroom
- Attendance: 2,000

Pay-per-view chronology
← Previous; Slammiversary XVI	Next → Homecoming

Bound for Glory chronology
← Previous; 2017	Next → 2019

The 2018 Bound for Glory was a professional wrestling pay-per-view (PPV) event produced by Impact Wrestling. It took place on October 14, 2018, at the Melrose Ballroom in Astoria, New York. It was the fourteenth event under the Bound for Glory chronology.

Eight matches were contested at the event. In the main event, Johnny Impact defeated Austin Aries for the Impact World Championship. In other prominent matches, The Latin American Xchange (Konnan, Santana and Ortiz) defeated The OGz (King, Hernandez and Homicide) in a Concrete Jungle Death match, Ohio Versus Everything (Dave Crist, Jake Crist and Sami Callihan) defeated Brian Cage, Fénix and Pentagón Jr. in a oVe Rules match, and Tessa Blanchard defeated Taya Valkyrie to retain the Impact Knockouts Championship.

== Production ==
=== Background ===
At Slammiversary XVI, Impact Wrestling announced that Bound for Glory was to be held on October 14, 2018, at the Melrose Ballroom.

=== Storylines ===
The event featured professional wrestling matches that involve different wrestlers from pre-existing scripted feuds and storylines. Wrestlers portrayed villains, heroes, or less distinguishable characters in the scripted events that built tension and culminated in a wrestling match or series of matches.

On September 6 episode of Impact!, Konnan and King were called for a meeting by their commissioner, who stated that King along with The OGz (Hernandez and Homicide) will face the team of Konnan and The Latin American Xchange (Santana and Ortiz) in their final war, a Concrete Jungle Death match. Also on that episode, Johnny Impact revealed that he will challenge Austin Aries at Bound for Glory for the Impact World Championship. He was later attacked by Aries, Killer Kross and Moose.

On September 13 episode of Impact!, Ohio Versus Everything (Dave Crist and Jake Crist) and Sami Callihan issued a challenge to Brian Cage, Fénix and Pentagón Jr. to an oVe Rules match at Bound for Glory.

On September 21, it was announced that Eddie Edwards will face Moose at Bound for Glory.

After Tessa Blanchard successfully defended the Impact Knockouts Championship against Faby Apache on the September 27 episode of Impact!, Taya Valkyrie challenged Blanchard to a match at Bound for Glory for the Impact Knockouts Championship.

During a match between Rich Swann and Matt Sydal on October 4 episode of Impact!, Ethan Page attacked Swann while the referee was distracted, helping Sydal to win the match. Later in that episode, Sydal announced that he and Page will face Swann on Bound for Glory, with a tag team partner of Swann's choosing. Swann announced that his tag team partner will be Willie Mack.

On October 11 episode of Impact!, Eli Drake issued an open challenge for anyone to wrestle against him at Bound for Glory.

== Event ==
Other on-screen personnel
Role:	Name:
English commentators	Josh Mathews
English commentators	Don Callis
Ring announcer	Dave Sturchio
Interviewer	McKenzie Mitchell

=== Preliminary matches ===
The pay-per-view opened with Rich Swann and Willie Mack facing Matt Sydal and Ethan Page in a tag team match. In the end, Swann pinned Sydal with the Phoenix splash to win.

Backstage, Ortiz and Santana found Konnan on the ground, who stated he was attacked by King. After that, Eli Drake entered the ring for his open challenge, which was answered by James Ellsworth. Drake quickly defeated Ellsworth after performing the Gravy Train. After the match, Drake said that he was looking for a real competitor. That brought out the Impact Hall of Famer, Abyss. The two brawled until Abyss chokeslammed Drake through a table.

Next, Tessa Blanchard defended the Impact Knockouts Championship against Taya Valkyrie. Blanchard retained her title after performing the Magnum.

In the following match, Eddie Edwards faced Moose. Edwards won by disqualification after being attacked by Killer Kross. Kross and Moose continued to attack Edwards until Tommy Dreamer made the save, that led into a tag team match with Dremaer and Edwards against Kross and Moose. Edwards pinned Moose with a roll up. After the match, Kross and Moose attacked Dreamer and Edwards.

After that, Ohio Versus Everything (Dave Crist, Jake Crist and Sami Callihan) defeated Brian Cage, Fénix and Pentagón Jr. in an oVe Rules match. Callihan performed a piledriver on Cage to win the match for his team.

Later, The Latin American Xchange (Santana and Ortiz) faced The OGz (Hernandez, Homicide and King) in a Concrete Jungle Death match, which featured the ring stripped of its canvass and padding, exposing the wooden boards and turnbuckles. Konnan joined Santana and Ortiz near the end of the match. Santana and Ortiz performed a combo of a blockbuster and a powerbomb on King to win the match.

Next, Allie entered into the Undead Realm to save Kiera Hogan. Allie fought Su Yung and her undead bridesmaids, and with the assist of Rosemary, Allie was able to save Hogan. However, as Allie and Hogan left the Undead realm, it turned out that Allie was possessed.

=== Main event ===
In the main event, Austin Aries (accompanied by Killer Kross and Moose) defended the Impact World Championship against Johnny Impact (accompanied by Taya Valkyrie). Impact performed the Starship Pain on Aries to win the title.

== Aftermath ==
Moments after the main event ended, Aries immediately rose to his feet, effectively no-selling Impact's Starship Pain finisher, and pointed to the arena balcony while shouting at Impact Wrestling co-executive vice president and commentator Don Callis. Then, Aries walked up the ramp while flipping off the fans in attendance and one to Callis before leaving. It was unclear at the time if this was an example of a worked shoot.

== Results ==
No.	Results	Stipulations	Times
1	Rich Swann and Willie Mack defeated Matt Sydal and Ethan Page	Tag team match	12:20
2	Eli Drake defeated James Ellsworth	Singles match	2:10
3	Tessa Blanchard (c) defeated Taya Valkyrie	Singles match for the Impact Knockouts Championship	10:36
4	Eddie Edwards defeated Moose by disqualification	Singles match	2:00
5	Eddie Edwards and Tommy Dreamer defeated Moose and Killer Kross	No Disqualification tag team match	9:30
6	Ohio Versus Everything (Dave Crist, Jake Crist and Sami Callihan) defeated Brian Cage, Fénix and Pentagón Jr.	oVe Rules match	13:31
7	The Latin American Xchange (Konnan, Santana and Ortiz) defeated The OGz (King, Hernandez and Homicide)	Concrete Jungle Death match	9:29
8	Johnny Impact (with Taya Valkyrie) defeated Austin Aries (c) (with Killer Kross and Moose)	Singles match for the Impact World Championship	21:03
(c) / – the champion(s) heading into the match

== See also ==
- 2018 in professional wrestling
- Bound for Glory Series
