= House of Glory Heavyweight Championship =

Men's professional wrestling world championship

HOG Heavyweight Championship
- Current title design

Details
- Promotion: House of Glory
- Date established: August 16, 2014
- Current champion: Joey Silver
- Date won: August 7, 2026
Statistics
- First champion: Ricochet
- Most reigns: Anthony Gangone (2 times)
- Longest reign: Anthony Gangone (1,374 days)
- Shortest reign: Ricochet (125 days)
- Heaviest champion: Ethan Carter III (224 lbs)
- Lightest champion: Amazing Red (150 lbs)

The HOG Heavyweight Championship is a men's professional wrestling world championship created and promoted by the American promotion House of Glory (HOG), being sanctioned as the promotion's top championship. There have been a total of eleven reigns shared between ten different champions and one vacancy.

== Title history ==
Ricochet was inaugural champion, with his reign being the shortest at 125 days. Anthony Gangone has the most reigns at two, with his second reign being the longest at 1,374 days. Charles Mason is the current champion in his first reign. He defeated Mike Santana and Tomohiro Ishii at Mike Santana Presents Puerto Rican Weekend on June 7, 2025, in New York, NY.

=== Inaugural Tournament (2014) ===
First Round
Drew Gulak	Pin
Shane Strickland
J. T. Dunn
Brian XL	Pin
Anthony Gangone	Pin
Dan Maff
Marq Quen
Ricochet	Pin

Semifinals
Drew Gulak	Pin
Brian XL
Anthony Gangone
Ricochet	Pin

Finals
Drew Gulak
Ricochet	Pin

== Reigns ==
Key
No.	Overall reign number
Reign	Reign number for the specific champion
Days	Number of days held
+	Current reign is changing daily

No.	Champion	Championship change			Reign statistics		Notes	Ref.
No.	Champion	Date	Event	Location	Reign	Days	Notes	Ref.
1	Ricochet	August 16, 2014	Quest For Glory	Ridgewood, NY	1	125	Defeated Drew Gulak in Tournament final to become the inaugural champion.	
2	Brian XL	December 19, 2014	Phenomenal Showdown	Jamaica, NY	1	245		
3	Smiley	August 21, 2015	At Last	Jamaica, NY	1	232		
4	Ethan Carter III	April 9, 2016	Stronger Than Ever	Elmhurst, NY	1	168		
5	Anthony Gangone	September 24, 2016	All or Nothing	Elmhurst, NY	1	328	This was a triple threat match, which also involving Brian Cage.	
6	Amazing Red	August 18, 2017	High Intensity 6	Jamaica, NY	1	364		
7	Anthony Gangone	August 17, 2018	High Intensity 7	New York City, NY	2	1,374	This was a No Ropes Match. Since he lost, Amazing Red had to join the House of Gangone.	
—	Vacated	May 22, 2022	—	—	—	—		
8	Jacob Fatu	October 29, 2022	Exodus	New York City, NY	1	202	Defeated Carlos Ramirez to win the vacant title.	
9	Matt Cardona	May 19, 2023	Beware The Fury	New York City, NY	1	196		
10	Mike Santana	December 1, 2023	The Darkest Hour	New York City, NY	1	554		
11	Charles Mason	June 7, 2025	Mike Santana Presents Puerto Rican Weekend	New York City, NY	1	426	Mason invoked his "Matt Travis Memorial Contract." This was originally a singles match between Santana and Tomohiro Ishii but later converted into a three-way match after Mason invoked his contract mid-match.	
12	Joey Silver	August 7, 2026	High Intensity 2026	New York City, NY	1	29+		

== Combined reigns ==
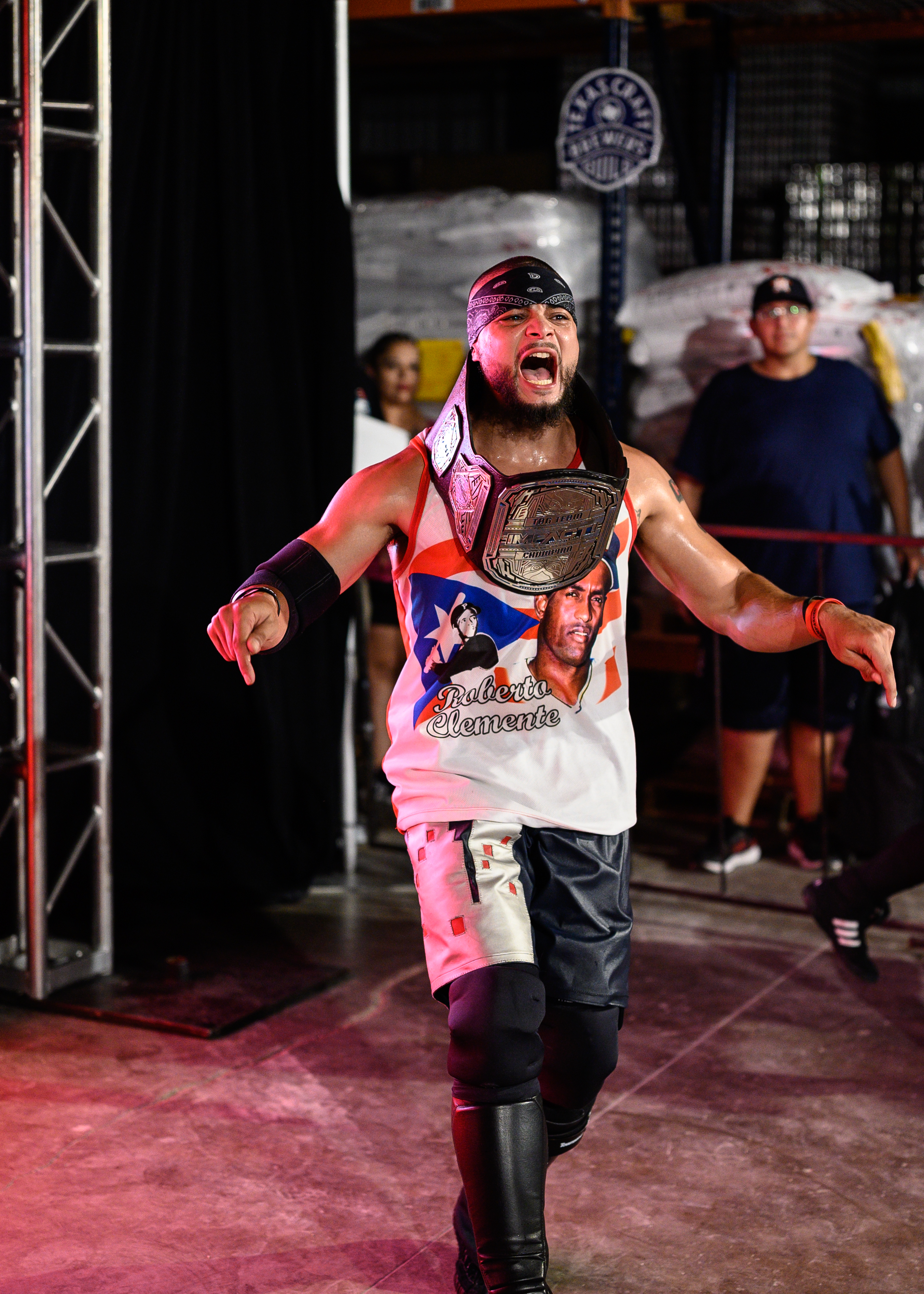
Former champion Mike Santana

As of September 5, 2026.

†	Indicates the current champion

Rank	Wrestler	No. of reigns	Combined days
1	Anthony Gangone	2	1,702
2	Mike Santana	1	554
3	Amazing Red	1	364
4	Charles Mason	1	426
5	Brian XL	1	245
6	Smiley	1	232
7	Jacob Fatu	1	202
8	Matt Cardona	1	196
9	Ethan Carter III	1	168
10	Ricochet	1	125
11	Joey Silver †	1	29+
