= House of Glory =

American professional wrestling school

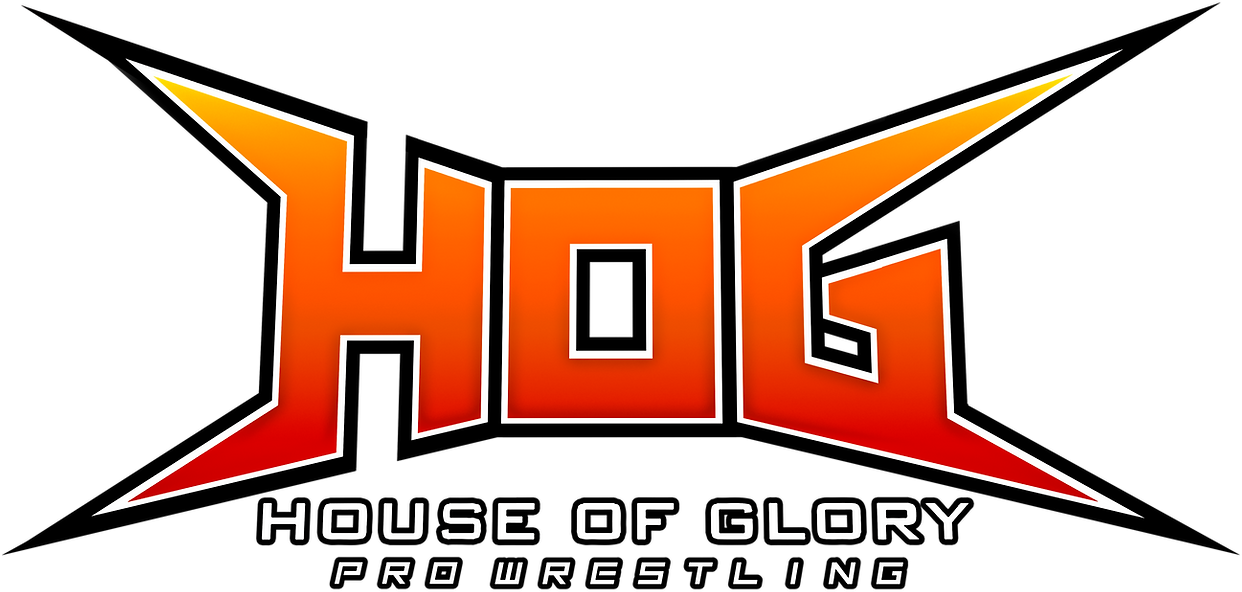
- Acronym: HOG
- Founded: 2012
- Style: Professional wrestling Sports entertainment
- Headquarters: New York City, New York, U.S.
- Founder(s): Amazing Red; Brian XL
- Owner: Master P
- Website: hogwrestling.net

House of Glory (HOG) is an American professional wrestling school and independent promotion based in New York founded by Amazing Red.

The promotion has run shows in New York City, New York, Chicago, Illinois, Haltom City, Texas, Las Vegas, Nevada, Philadelphia, Pennsylvania, and Toronto, Ontario, Canada.

== History ==
HOG was established in 2012 by Amazing Red and Brian XL, with the first show named High Intensity, which took place on May 5, 2012.

== Current champions ==
Championship	Current champion(s)	Reign	Date won	Days held	Location	Notes	Ref.
House of Glory
HOG World Heavyweight Championship	"Sweet Cheeks" Joey Silver	1	August 7, 2026	98+	Jamaica, NY	Defeated Charles Mason at High Intensity after cashing-in his Matt Travis Memorial Contract.	
HOG Crown Jewel Championship	Amazing Red	1	August 7, 2026	98+	Jamaica, NY	Defeated Zilla Fatu at High Intensity.	
HOG Cruiserweight Championship	"Blackheart" Lio Rush	1	August 7, 2026	98+	Jamaica, NY	Defeated Daron Richardson at High Intensity.	
HOG Women's Championship	Shotzi Blackheart	1	November 21, 2025	357+	Chicago, IL	Defeated Indi Hartwell at Return to the Windy City.	
HOG Tag Team Championship	The Hardys (Matt Hardy and Jeff Hardy)	2	October 10, 2025	399+	New York City, NY	Defeated The Mane Event (Jay Lyon and Midas Black) at With Glory Comes Pride in a Winners Take All match where The Hardys' TNA World Tag Team Championship was also on the line.	
Legacy Pro Wrestling
LPW Heavyweight Championship	Jodi Aura	2	March 21, 2025	602+	New York City, NY	Defeated Oni King at LPW Relentless 2025.	
LPW Women’s Championship	Amiira Sahar	1	June 6, 2025	525+	New York City, NY	Defeated Diamond Virago at LPW Fortitude 2025.	
LPW Tag Team Championship	Dual Focus (JJP and KB Prime)	1	December 20, 2025	328+	New York City, NY	Defeated Scam Likely (Jay Champagne and Vic Vendetta) (with Patrick Saint) at LPW Ascension 2025 by winning the LPW Tag Team Championship Tournament to become the inaugural champions.	

== Popularity in media ==
In 2015, House of Glory was featured in a MTV news article.

In 2025, the New York based promotion was featured in a Sports Illustrated article following the appearance of Mercedes Moné.

== See also ==
- List of independent wrestling promotions in the United States
