= Amazing Red =

Puerto Rican professional wrestler (born 1982)

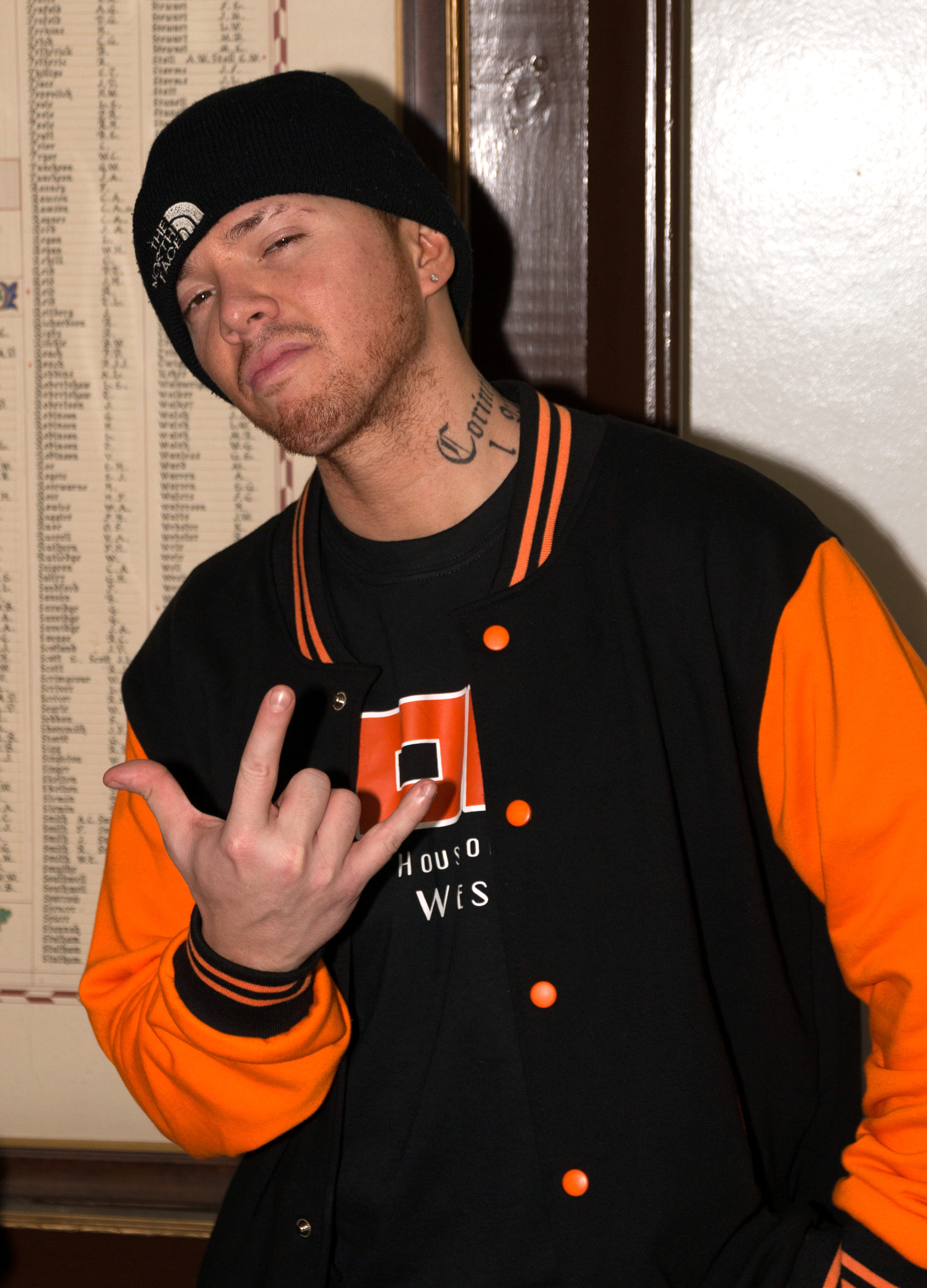
- Amazing Red in 2014

Personal information
- Born: Jonathan Figueroa; April 26, 1982 (age 44) Cayey, Puerto Rico
- Children: 2
- Family: Joel Maximo (cousin); Jose Maximo (cousin); Zelina Vega (cousin)

Professional wrestling career
- Ring name(s): Amazing Red; El Rojo; Fuego Guerrero; Misterio Red; Red; Airwalk Spriggan; Spriggan; Sangriento; Dios Dorado
- Billed height: 5 ft 6 in (168 cm)
- Billed weight: 150 lb (68 kg)
- Billed from: Brooklyn, New York; Tijuana, Mexico (As Sangriento)
- Trained by: Mikey Whipwreck
- Debut: 1998

Jonathan Figueroa (born April 26, 1982), better known by his ring name Amazing Red, is a Puerto Rican professional wrestler and promoter. He performs on the independent circuit, predominantly for House of Glory (HOG), of which he is the founder and also serves as a head trainer while also being the current HOG Crown Jewel Champion in his first reign. He also makes appearances in Total Nonstop Action Wrestling (TNA), where he is the current TNA X Division Champion in his fourth reign and a member of the TNA Hall of Fame.

He has worked on the American independent circuit and appeared for Ring of Honor (ROH) and Combat Zone Wrestling (CZW). He became best known for his stints in TNA as part of the X Division, where he won the X Division Championship four times.

In April 2019, Red announced his retirement from professional wrestling due to a severe neck injury. However, he would return to the ring only a few months later to work for New Japan Pro-Wrestling (NJPW).

== Professional wrestling career ==
=== International Wrestling Association (1998–2002) ===
Figueroa originally wrestled as Red, but Savio Vega decided to expand his ring name to include the word "Amazing" while he worked for the International Wrestling Association in Puerto Rico, giving origin to his more common pseudonym, Amazing Red.

=== NWA Total Nonstop Action (2002–2004) ===
Red, who was already known for his work in the United States independent circuit, joined NWA Total Nonstop Action (NWA TNA) at its 2002 inception, quickly establishing himself in its X Division. During his first run in TNA, Red held both the X Division Championship and the NWA World Tag Team Championship with Jerry Lynn, simultaneously. At Victory Road 2004, Red competed in a 20-man X-Division Gauntlet match for the X Division Cup which was won by Héctor Garza. He left TNA in November 2004.

=== Ring of Honor (2002–2003) ===
While working for TNA, he also wrestled for Ring of Honor as a member of the three-man tag team The S.A.T. with cousins, Jose and Joel Maximo. Eventually, he began to team with "The Phenomenal" A.J. Styles, becoming known together as Amazing Phenomenon. The team would go on to win the ROH Tag Team Championship from The Prophecy, defeating Christopher Daniels and Xavier. The duo would subsequently feud with the Prophecy and the Briscoes, but Homicide subbed in for Red for a successful title defense over Daniels and Dan Maff. Amazing Phenomenon's title reign lasted 158 days, and was vacated due to Red's injury.

=== All Japan Pro Wrestling (2003–2004) ===
Through late 2003, Amazing Red wrestled as Misterio Red as well as Airwalk Spriggan, while on a tour with All Japan Pro Wrestling. During the tour, he suffered a near career-ending knee injury, tearing his anterior cruciate ligament and having to undergo surgery which kept him on the sideline for an entire year.

=== WWE (2005, 2012) ===
Red wrestled CM Punk in a dark match at a SmackDown taping on May 12, 2005. In June 2012, Red wrestled a tryout dark match for WWE.

=== Independent circuit (2006–2008) ===
Red's last appearance was at a New York Wrestling Connection event at the beginning of 2006, where he lost his match to Javi-Air and re-injured his knee.

After being on the sidelines with his injury, Red made his return on December 13, 2008, at Jersey All Pro Wrestling's Best of the Light Heavyweights. The match was won by Archadia as he defeated Flip Kendrick and Louis Lyndon.

=== Return to TNA (2009–2011) ===
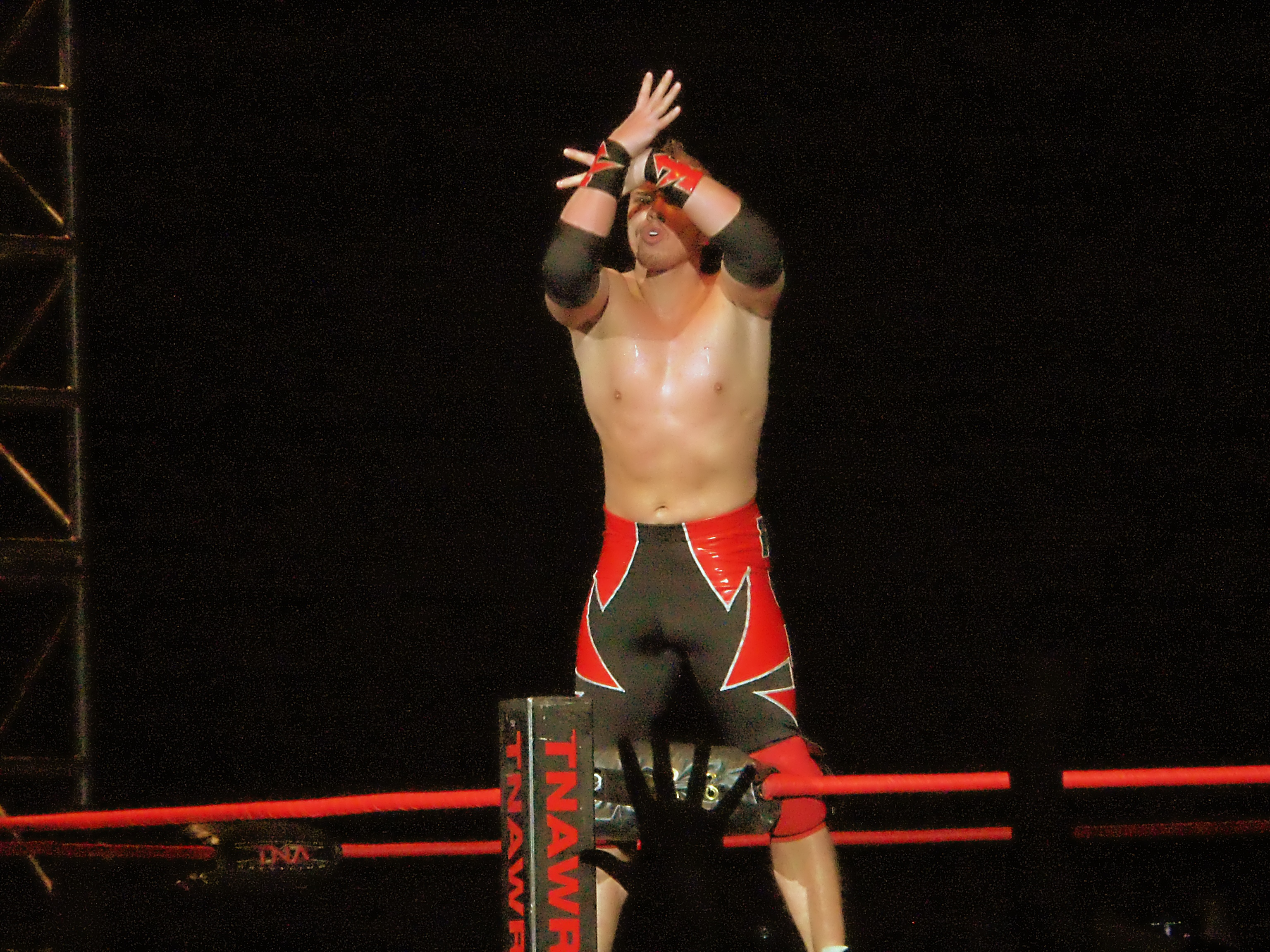
Amazing Red in 2010

In April 2009, it was announced via the TNA website that the Amazing Red would return to the company in the Team 3D Tag Team Invitational Tournament. On the April 30 episode of Impact!, he teamed with then-X Division Champion Suicide to defeat The Motor City Machine Guns (Alex Shelley and Chris Sabin).

Suicide and Amazing Red were eliminated from the tournament on the May 14 episode of Impact!, by new stable The British Invasion, after interference from Shelley and Sabin.

On the May 28 episode of Impact!, he challenged Suicide for the X Division Championship but was unsuccessful in winning the title for a second time. On August 16, at Hard Justice, Red competed in a Steel Asylum match in another losing effort. On the October 1 episode of Impact!, Red became the number one contender to Samoa Joe's X Division title by defeating Jay Lethal, Consequences Creed, Sheik Abdul Bashir and Kiyoshi in a ladder match. On the following Impact!, Red won the X Division Championship for the second time by pinning Samoa Joe following interference by Bobby Lashley. On the October 15 episode of Impact!, Don West debuted as Red's new manager. On October 18, at Bound for Glory, Red retained his X Division title in an Ultimate X match against Homicide, Daniels, Suicide, Alex Shelley and Chris Sabin. The following week on Impact!, Red lost to Homicide in a non-title match. The return match between the two was booked for Turning Point, where Red was able to retain his title. Afterwards Don West quietly broke off his affiliation with Red, while he went on to defend his title on TNA's weekly Webmatches against the likes of Chris Sabin and Homicide. At Genesis, Red retained his title in a match against the returning Brian Kendrick. On the January 28 episode of Impact!, the British Invasion attacked Red after his six-man tag team match. As Rob Terry was going to cash in his "Feast or Fired" briefcase, which gave him the right to challenge for the X Division Championship anytime, anywhere, his stable mate Doug Williams managed to convince him to hand it over to him and defeated Red to win the Championship. On the April 12 episode of Impact!, Red took the place of the injured Hernandez and teamed up with Matt Morgan to successfully defend the TNA World Tag Team Championship against the Motor City Machine Guns. After the match, Morgan attacked Red for getting the pinfall in the match. After a few weeks out of action, Red returned to Impact!, on the June 10 episode, in a losing effort against Kurt Angle. On September 23 Red defeated Jay Lethal at a live event in his hometown of New York City to win the X Division Championship for the third time. Red re-lost the title to Lethal two days later at a live event in Rahway, New Jersey. On the December 23 episode of Impact!, Red answered Jeff Jarrett's MMA Challenge, but was defeated by submission. After the match Red, told Jarrett that he had a younger brother, who would answer the challenge the following week. The following week Red's storyline brother, billed simply as Little Red (later renamed Crimson), answered the challenge and was winning his match against Jarrett, before Jarrett was pulled away from the ring by his security guards Gunner and Murphy. Shortly afterwards, Crimson broke away from Red and the relation between the two was seldom mentioned again.

On the April 19 episode of Xplosion, Figueroa debuted as Sangriento, a masked luchador, in a three-way match, where he defeated Jay Lethal and Chris Sabin. Sangriento made his Impact! debut on May 5, defeating Suicide. After defeating Suicide in a rematch the following week, Sangriento was not seen again for two months, until appearing in a backstage segment with Eric Young at Destination X on July 10. At the same pay-per-view Amazing Red wrestled in an X Division number one contender's Ultimate X match, which was won by Alex Shelley, and which would turn out to be his final match for the promotion. On August 4, 2011, Figueroa announced via his Twitter account that he had parted ways with TNA.

=== Return to ROH (2012) ===
On March 4, 2012, Red returned to Ring of Honor at the 10th Anniversary Show, where he teamed with T. J. Perkins in a losing effort against the House of Truth (Michael Elgin and Roderick Strong).

=== New Japan Pro-Wrestling (2019) ===
In August 2019, Red was announced for the New Japan Pro-Wrestling Super J Cup that takes place in late-August. He would be defeated in the first round by the IWGP Junior Heavyweight Champion Will Ospreay. He would then be booked for the September U.S. tour Fighting Spirit Unleashed.

=== House of Glory (2014–present) ===
In 2014, Red opened his own training school, House of Glory (HOG), which eventually began promoting its own events. During his initial stint in the company, he won the HOG Tag Team Championship with his former teammate Crimson after defeating The Young Bucks (Matt Jackson and Nick Jackson) for titles, and would hold them for 378 days before dropping them to the team of Anthony Gangone and Joey Janela. In 2017, Red defeated Gangone to win the HOG Heavyweight Championship at HOG's "High Intensity 6". He lost the title almost a year later at "High Intensity 7" back to Gangone in a No Ropes Match, which also forced Red to join the House of Gangone stable. He would full embrace the stable and turn heel when he attacked two of his students, Private Party (Marq Quen and Isiah Kassidy).

After recovering from his near-career-ending neck injury in 2019, Red was welcomed back to HOG by the fans, becoming a babyface again. That same year at "HOG Nine", he would defeat Charles Mason, KC Navarro, Leroy Green, Nolo Kitano, and Smiley in a Suicidal Six Way Challenge for the then-named HOG Suicidal Six Way Championship (later renamed the HOG Cruiserweight Championship on Red's last day as champion), and would go on to hold it for a record 860 days before losing it to Navarro. During that time, he would also lose in a non-title match to Will Ospreay. In 2023, Red would team with HOG co-owner Brian XL to form a tag team called "The Bookers" and would win the HOG Tag Team Championship for a second time from The Mane Event at HOG's 2023 "With Glory Comes Pride". They would lose the titles in a Steel Cage match back to The Mane Event at "High Intensity X", ending their reign at 161 days. Red would try again for the HOG Heavyweight Championship against Mike Santana in a No Disqualification match at "Mike Santana Presents Puerto Rican Weekend 2024", but failed to win the title. At HOG's 2024 "High Intensity", he would lose to then-AEW World Champion Swerve Strickland. In 2025, Red failed to regain the HOG Cruiserweight Championship from Daron Richardson in a No Disqualification match at that year's "Mike Santana Presents Puerto Rican Weekend", but would win the Matt Tavis Memorial 2025 Battle Royale at "High Intensity 2025"; that same event, he lost to HOG alumni Ricochet.

Red would lose back-to-back matches against TNA's Cedric Alexander and Leon Slater at HOG's "Philadelphia" and "With Glory Come Pride 2025" respectively, but would bounce back with wins against Nic Nemeth and Tyler Breeze at "HOG x The Big Event SuperClash 2025" and "Return to Windy City" respectively. After that, he would go on a losing streak against the likes of Richardson (again for the Cruiserweight Championship), Andrade El Idolo, Sammy Guevara, Bandido, "Speedball" Mike Bailey, and Ricky Sosa. At "High Intensity 2026", Red snapped the losing streak when he defeated Zilla Fatu to win the HOG Crown Jewel Championship, becoming the second of two male wrestlers (the other being Charles Mason) to have won all of the men's championships in HOG. He would lose a non-title match against AEW's Kyle Fletcher at "Fall Out 2026", but would have successful title defenses against Angel Jacquez and Marcus Mathers at "Windy City Warfare" and "Salvation 2026", respectively.

=== Second return to TNA (2026–present) ===
On June 15, 2026, TNA officially announced Red's return to the promotion at Slammiversary. After the Ultimate X match at Slammiversary, it was announced that Amazing Red would be inducted into the TNA Hall of Fame at October's Bound for Glory PPV. At the event, along with accepting his induction, Red would also defeat BDE, Cedric Alexander, Fabian Aichner, KC Navarro, Rich Swann, and Ryan Nemeth in a seven-way scramble to win his fourth X-Division Championship, becoming the first male wrestler to win a championship after being inducted into the TNA Hall of Fame at the same night.

== Professional wrestling style and persona ==
Red is known for his high-flying style. He has been described as a pioneer and an innovator during the early 2000s. Will Ospreay and Kevin Owens have praised his style and influence in pro wrestling.

== Personal life ==
Figueroa is married and has two children with his wife. He is the cousin of wrestlers Joel and Jose Maximo and Zelina Vega.

== Championships and accomplishments ==
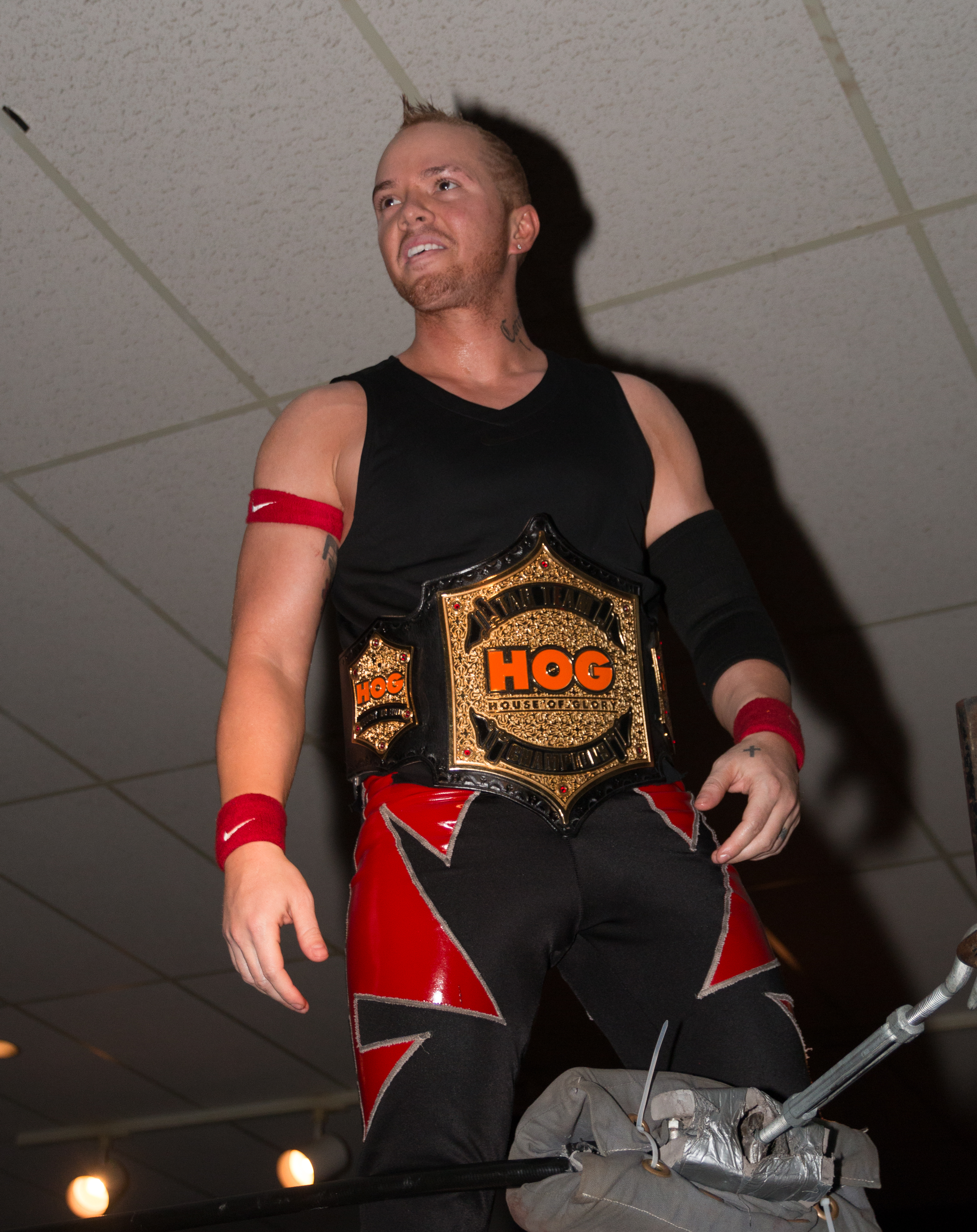
Amazing Red with the HOG Tag Team Championship

- Cleveland All-Pro Wrestling
  - CAPW North American Junior Heavyweight Championship (1 time)
- East Coast Wrestling Association
  - ECWA Heavyweight Championship (2 times)
- Combat Zone Wrestling
  - CZW World Tag Team Championship (1 time) – with Anthony Gangone
- Great Championship Wrestling
  - GCW Cruiserweight Championship (1 time)
- Hardcore Wrestling Alliance
  - HWA Heavyweight Championship (1 time)
- House of Glory
  - HOG Heavyweight Championship (1 time)
  - HOG Crown Jewel Championship (1 time, current)
  - HOG Cruiserweight Championship (1 time)
  - HOG Tag Team Championship (1 time) – with Crimson
  - HOG Suicidal 6 Way Championship (1 time)
  - Matt Travis Memorial Battle Royale (2025)
- Impact Championship Wrestling
  - ICW Heavyweight Championship (1 time)
  - ICW Tag Team Championship (1 time) – with Danny Demanto
- Indie Wrestling Hall of Fame
  - Indie Wrestling Hall of Fame (2025)
- Maryland Championship Wrestling
  - MCW Cruiserweight Championship (1 time)
- New York Wrestling Connection
  - NYWC Interstate Championship (1 time)
- New England Frontier Wrestling
  - NEFW Tag Team Championships (1 time) - with Brian XL
- Premier Wrestling Federation
  - PWF Junior Heavyweight Championship (2 times)
- Pro Wrestling Illustrated
  - PWI ranked him #87 of the top 500 singles wrestlers in the PWI 500 in 2010
- Pro Wrestling Syndicate
  - PWS Suicidal Six-way Championship (1 time)
- Renegade Wrestling Alliance
  - RWA Cruiserweight Championship (1 time)
- Ring of Honor
  - ROH World Tag Team Championship (1 time) – with A.J. Styles
- Total Nonstop Action Wrestling
  - TNA X Division Championship (4 times, current)
  - NWA World Tag Team Championship (1 time) – with Jerry Lynn
  - TNA Hall of Fame (Class of 2026)
- United States Extreme Wrestling
  - USEW United States Heavyweight Championship (1 time)
- United Xtreme Wrestling / USA Pro Wrestling
  - UXW/USA Pro United States Championship (2 times)
- Unreal Championship Wrestling
  - UCW Heavyweight Championship (1 time)
- Other titles
  - HWVY Junior Heavyweight Championship (1 time)

== See also ==
- Professional wrestling in Puerto Rico
