= HOG Cruiserweight Championship =

Men's professional wrestling championship

Details
- Promotion: House Of Glory
- Date established: August 9, 2019
- Current champion: Lio Rush

Other names
- HOG Cruiserweight Championship (2022-present); HOG Suicidal Six Way Championship (2019-2022)
Statistics
- First champion: Charles Mason
- Most reigns: KC Navarro (2 reigns)
- Longest reign: Amazing Red (860 days)
- Shortest reign: KC Navarro (83 days)
- Heaviest champion: Gringo Loco (253 lbs)
- Lightest champion: Amazing Red (150 lbs)

The HOG Cruiserweight Championship is a men's professional wrestling championship created and promoted by the American promotion House of Glory (HOG). It serves as one of the promotion's two men's midcard championships, the other being the HOG Crown Jewel Championship. The current champion is Lio Rush, who is in his first reign.

== History ==
The title was originally established on August 9, 2019, as the HOG Suicidal Six Way Championship. Under its original concept, the championship was centered around the chaotic, high-stakes “Suicidal Six-Way” match format, featuring multiple competitors in high-flying matches associated with cruiserweights, lucha libre, and junior heavyweight styles.

On April 15, 2022, following Amazing Red’s historic 860-day reign, the championship was renamed the HOG Cruiserweight Championship at HOG Tribulations. The name change rebranded the title as a more traditional cruiserweight championship while retaining the multi-man match format that defined its origins. Since the renaming, the championship has continued to be defended in multi-man matches while also being contested in one-on-one matches.

== Reigns ==
Name	Years
HOG Cruiserweight Championship	April 4, 2022 - present
HOG Suicidial Six Way Championship	August 9, 2019 – April 4, 2022

Key
No.	Overall reign number
Reign	Reign number for the specific champion
Days	Number of days held
+	Current reign is changing daily

No.	Champion	Championship change			Reign statistics		Notes	Ref.
No.	Champion	Date	Event	Location	Reign	Days	Notes	Ref.
1	Charles Mason	August 9, 2019	HOG High Intensity 8	New York City, NY	1	120	Defeated Brian Burgundy, Leroy Green, Matt Macintosh, Nolo Kitano, and Rich Swann in a Suicidial Six Way match to become the inaugural champion	
2	Amazing Red	December 7, 2019	HOG Nine	New York City, NY	1	860	Defeated previous Charles Mason, KC Navarro, Leroy Green, Nolo Kitano, and Smiley in a Suicidal Six Way match	
3	KC Navarro	April 15, 2022	HOG Tribulations	New York City, NY	1	135	Defeated previous champion Amazing Red, Encore, Ichiban, Mantequilla, Michael Fain, and Nolo Kitano in a Six Way match. The title was renamed the "HOG Cruiserweight Championship" at the event.	
4	Mantequilla	August 28, 2022	HOG High Intensity 9	New York City, NY	1	264	Defeated previous champion KC Navarro, Brian XL, Buddy Matthews, Grim Reefer, and Nolo Kitano in a Suicidal Six Way match	
5	Joey Silver	May 19, 2023	HOG Beware the Fury 2023	New York City, NY	1	91	Defeated previous champion Mantequilla, Alec Price, Ben Ruten, Ichiban, Nolo Kitano, and Raheem Royal in a Gauntlet match	
6	Nolo Kitano	August 18, 2023	HOG High Intensity X	New York City, NY	1	197	Defeated previous Joey Silver, Isiah Kassidy, Jordan Oliver, Raheem Royal, and Super Crazy in a Suicidal Six Way Ladder match	
7	KC Navarro	March 2, 2024	HOG Reckoning	New York City, NY	2	83	Defeated previous champion Nolo Kitano, Daron Richardson, Jay Armani, Jay Lyon, and Raheem Royal in a Suicidal Six Way match	
8	Gringo Loco	May 24, 2024	HOG The War Within	New York City, NY	1	210		
9	Daron Richardson	December 20, 2024	HOG Live For The Moment	New York City, NY	1	595	Defeated previous champion Gringo Loco, Dante Griffith, J Boujii, Joey Silver, and Mantequilla in a Six Way match	
10	Lio Rush	August 7, 2026	HOG High Intensity 2026	New York City, NY	1	104+	This was a No Holds Barred match.	

== Combined reigns ==
As of November 19, 2026, there have been a total of ten reigns shared between nine wrestlers. Charles Mason was the inaugural champion. KC Navarro has the most reigns with two. Amazing Red's reign is the longest at 860 days, while Navarro's second reign is the shortest at 83 days.

Lio Rush is the current champion in his first reign. He won the title by defeating previous champion Daron Richardson at HOG High Intensity 2026 in New York City, NY on August 7, 2026 in a No Holds Barred match.

†	Indicates the current champion

Rank	Wrestler	No. of reigns	Combined days
1	Amazing Red	1	860
2	Daron Richardson	1	595
3	Mantequilla	1	264
4	KC Navarro	2	218
5	Gringo Loco	1	210
6	Nolo Kitano	1	197
7	Charles Mason	1	120
8	Lio Rush †	1	104+
9	Joey Silver	1	91
