= Gringo Loco =

American professional wrestler

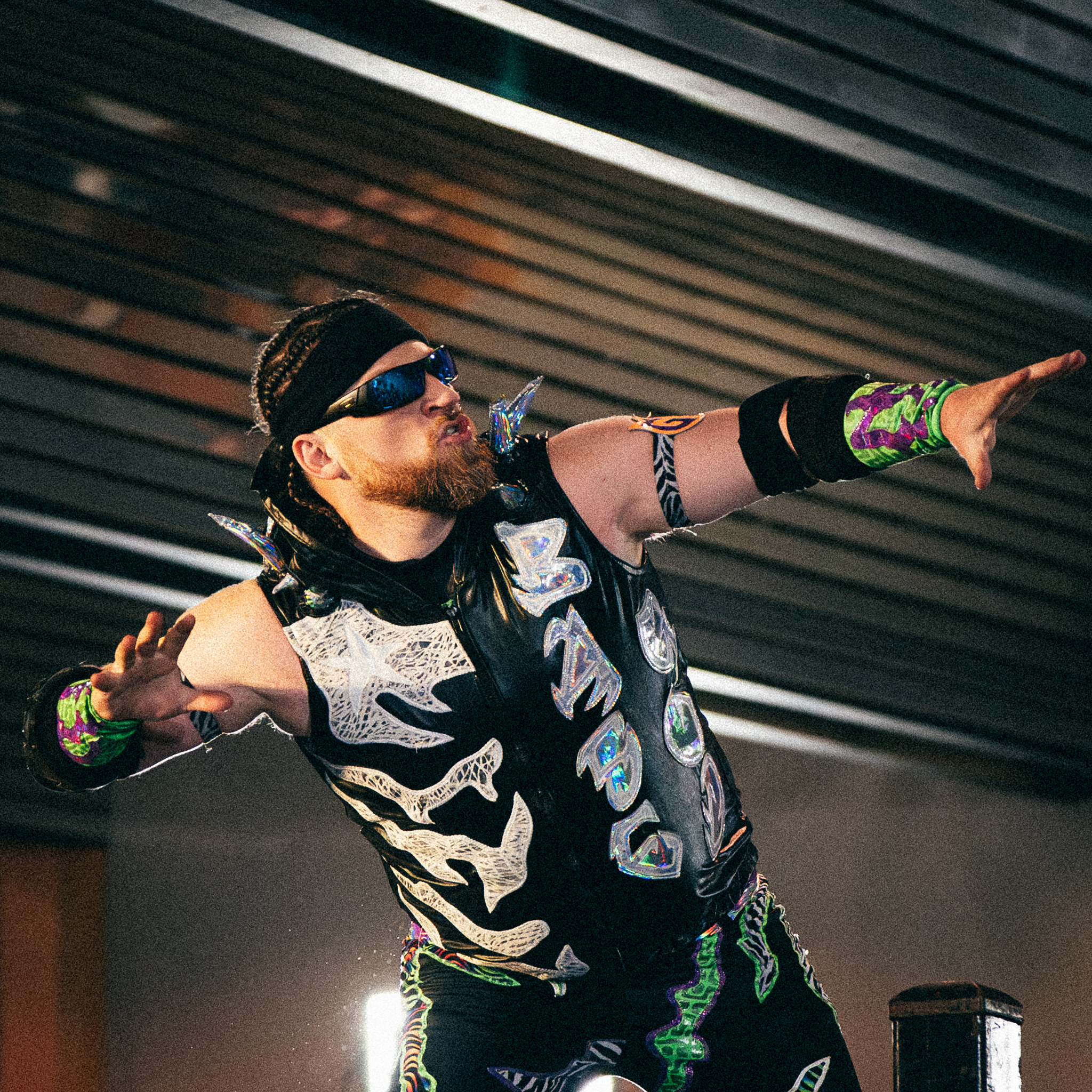
- Loco in April 2024

Personal information
- Born: Charlie Santo; July 20, 1985 (age 41) Chicago, Illinois

Professional wrestling career
- Ring name(s): Gringo Loco; Tyme Paige
- Billed height: 5 ft 7 in (170 cm)
- Billed weight: 253 lb (115 kg)
- Billed from: Chicago, Illinois
- Trained by: Skayde
- Debut: 2000

Charlie Santo (born July 20, 1985), better known by the ring name Gringo Loco, is an American professional wrestler. He currently performs on the independent circuit.

== Career ==
Santo began his career in 2000, wrestling on the independent circuit in Mexico. He made his Game Changer Wrestling debut in 2018. Throughout 2021 and 2022, he made several appearances for Major League Wrestling and Game Changer Wrestling.

On August 30, 2023, he made his All Elite Wrestling debut on Rampage, teaming with Kip Sabian, losing to El Hijo del Vikingo and Nick Wayne. He made his AEW Collision debut on July 20, 2024, losing to the debuting Hologram.

Since 2021, Game Changer Wrestling has held the annual GCW Gringo Loco's The Wrld On Lucha pay-per-view event.

== Championships and accomplishments ==
- Absolute Intense Wrestling
  - AIW Tag Team Championship (1 time) - with Steve Pain
  - Double Dare Tag Team Tournament (2016) - with Steve Pain
- DDT Pro-Wrestling
  - DDT Universal Championship (1 time)
- DEFY Wrestling
  - DEFY PrimoLucha Championship (1 time)
  - DEFY Tag Team Championship (1 time) – with Arez
- Demand Lucha
  - Lucha Premier Championship (1 time)
  - Royal Canadian Tag Team Championship (1 time, current) - with Arez
- DREAMWAVE Wrestling
  - DREAMWAVE Alternative Championship (1 time)
- GALLI Lucha Libre
  - GALLI Indiscutible Championship (1 time)
  - GALLI Tag Team Championship (1 time) - with Golden Dragon
- House of Glory
  - HOG Cruiserweight Championship (1 time)
- International Wrestling Revolution Group
  - Distrito Federal Trios Championship (1 time) – with Avisman and El Hijo del Diablo
  - IWRG Distrito Federal Trios Title Tournament (2010) – with Avisman and El Hijo del Diablo
- Mondo Lucha
  - Mondo Lucha Championship (1 time)
- Pro Wrestling Illustrated
  - Ranked No. 171 of the top 500 singles wrestlers in the PWI 500 in 2025
- The Wrestling Revolver
  - Revolver Remix Championship (1 time)
  - Revolver 24/7 Scramble Championship (1 time, current)
- Warrior Wrestling
  - Warrior Wrestling Lucha Championship (1 time, current)
