= Revolver 24/7 Scramble Championship =

Professional wrestling championship

Details
- Promotion: The Wrestling Revolver
- Date established: November 6, 2016
- Current champion: Gringo Loco
- Date won: October 2, 2026

Other names
- Open Invite Scramble Championship (2016–2020); Revolver 24/7 Scramble Championship (2025–present)
Statistics
- First champion: Jason Cade
- Most reigns: Bigg Pound (6 reigns)
- Longest reign: Matthew Palmer (274 days)
- Shortest reign: VYBE Crash Test Dummy (1 minute)
- Oldest champion: Joey Ryan (37 years, 179 days)
- Youngest champion: Johnnie Crist (10 years)
- Heaviest champion: Bigg Pound
- Lightest champion: Johnnie Crist

The Revolver 24/7 Scramble Championship is a professional wrestling championship created and promoted by The Wrestling Revolver. Established on November 6, 2016, it was originally called the Open Invite Scramble Championship. The championship was retired on January 4, 2020, but it was reinstated on October 3, 2025, as the Revolver 24/7 Scramble Championship. The title also took on the special rule that it could be defended "24/7", in which a title defense can occur anytime and anywhere, as long as a referee is present. The current champion is Gringo Loco, who is in his first reign. He won the title by defeating previous champion Crash, Bigg Pound, Harley Rock, Kiran Grey, Kristian Robinson, and Troy Parker in a seven-way scramble at Tales from the Ring IX on October 2, 2026.

== History ==
On November 6, 2016, The Wrestling Revolver announced the Open Invite Scramble Championship. Jason Cade became the inaugural champion after winning an 11-way AR Fox Open Invite Scramble Ladder match at Pancakes & Piledrivers on April 1, 2017. The title was retired on January 4, 2020 when champion John Skyler trashed the title, claiming it as the representation of "garbage wrestling". On October 3, 2025, the title was reinstated and renamed to the Revolver 24/7 Scramble Championship. The title also began carrying the special rule that it could be defended "24/7", in which a title defense could occur anytime and anywhere, as long as a referee is present.

== Reigns ==
As of November 15, 2026, there has been 25 official reigns between 20 different champions, with one unrecognized reign. Jason Cade was the inaugural champion. Bigg Pound has the most reigns at six. Matthew Palmer has the longest reign at 274 days, while the VYBE Crash Test Dummy has the shortest reign at one minute. Rachel Armstrong was the first female champion. Johnnie Crist, the daughter of Jake Crist, is the youngest champion, winning the title at 10 years old. Joey Ryan is the oldest champion, winning the title at 37 years and 179 days old.

Gringo Loco is the current champion in his first reign. He won the title by defeating previous champion Crash, Bigg Pound, Harley Rock, Kiran Grey, Kristian Robinson, and Troy Parker in a seven-way scramble at Tales from the Ring IX on October 2, 2026, in Dayton, Ohio.

Key
No.	Overall reign number
Reign	Reign number for the specific champion
Days	Number of days held
Days recog.	Number of days held recognized by the promotion
<1	Reign lasted less than a day

No.	Champion	Championship change			Reign statistics			Notes	Ref.
No.	Champion	Date	Event	Location	Reign	Days	Days recog.	Notes	Ref.
1	Jason Cade	April 1, 2017	Pancakes & Piledrivers	Orlando, FL	1	1	1	Cade won an 11-way AR Fox Open Invite Scramble Ladder match to become the inaugural champion.	
2	AR Fox	April 2, 2017	Midnight-Ish After Mania	Orlando, FL	1	33	33	This was co-produced by WrestleCircus (WC). This was a 16-way Championship Scramble Invitational Elimination match, where the WC Sideshow Championship was also on the line.	
†	Joey Ryan	May 5, 2017	Plead the Fifth	Clive, IA	1	50	—	This was a Winner Takes All match where Ryan's DDT Iron Man Heavy Metal Championship and AR Fox's WC Sideshow Championship were also on the line. After Ryan received multiple allegations of sexual misconduct in 2020, Revolver Wrestling unrecognized his reign.	
3	Jordan Len-X	June 24, 2017	WrestleCircus Dive Hard with a Vengeance	Austin, TX	1	41	41	This was a WrestleCircus (WC) event. This was a 12-way Three Falls match where the DDT Iron Man Heavy Metal Championship was on the line in the first fall, the WC Sideshow Championship in the second, and the Open Invite Scramble Championship in the third. Len-X won the third fall to win the Open Invite Scramble Championship.	
4	Matthew Palmer	August 4, 2017	The Catalina Wrestling Mixer	Dayton, OH	1	274	274	This was co-produced by Rockstar Pro Wrestling. This was a 13-way match.	
5	Rich Swann	May 5, 2018	Penta Does Iowa	Des Moines, IA	1	90	90	This was co-produced by Impact Wrestling. This nine-way match also featured Ace Austin, Air Wolf, Andy Dalton, Chip Day, Gringo Loco, Larry D, and Sugar Dunkerton.	
6	Ace Austin	August 3, 2018	The Catalina Wrestling Mixer Vol. 2	Dayton, OH	1	78	78	This was a 16-way match.	
7	Caleb Konley	October 20, 2018	Tales from the Ring	Des Moines, IA	1	202	202	This was an 11-way match also featured Andy Dalton, Chainsaw King, Clayton Gainz, Lil N8, Madman Fulton, Pat Monix, Ron Mathis, Steve Manders, and Thomas Shire.	
8	Wrestling Tent	May 10, 2019	3 Year Anniversary	Des Moines, IA	1	77	77	This was a 14-way match.	
9	Jake Manning	July 26, 2019	Afraid of the Dark	Des Moines, IA	1	70	70	This 10-way match also featured Christian Kobain, Clayton Gainz, Crash Jaxon, JT Energy, Nevaeh, Shay Purser, Stephen Wolf, and The Yellow Dog.	
10	Clayton Gainz	October 4, 2019	Tales from the Ring	Des Moines, IA	1	84	84	This was co-produced by Impact Wrestling. This seven-way match also featured Beautiful Bobby, Dave Crist, Jessicka Havok, Jimmy Jacobs, and The Yellow Dog.	
11	John Skyler	December 27, 2019	The Nightmare After X-Mas	Des Moines, IA	1	8	8	This six-way match also featured Air Wolf, Crash Jaxon, JT Energy, and The Yellow Dog.	
—	Deactivated	January 4, 2020	—	—	—	—	—	Previous champion John Skyler retired the title by trashing the belt, claiming that the title represented "garbage wrestling".	
12	Bigg Pound	October 3, 2025	Tales from the Ring	Dayton, OH	1	76	76	The title was brought out of retirement. Pound defeated Action Braxton, Amazonga, Jeffrey John, Joe Alonzo, Juni Underwood, and KC Jacobs in a Sudden Death Scramble match to win the reinstated title.	
13	Rachel Armstrong	December 18, 2025	Holiday Special	Dayton, OH	1	<1	<1	This seven-way match also featured Jeffrey John, Phil Shark, Harley Rock, Sway Archer, and Juni Underwood.	
14	Bigg Pound	December 18, 2025	Holiday Special	Dayton, OH	2	<1	<1		
15	Johnnie Crist	December 18, 2025	Holiday Special	Dayton, OH	1	<1	<1	Johnnie, who was 10 years old at the time, is the daughter of Jake Crist. Johnnie pinned an unconscious Pound backstage.	
16	Bigg Pound	December 18, 2025	Holiday Special	Dayton, OH	3	1	1	Previous champion Johnnie Crist handed the title back to Pound.	
17	"Jarren" Small Afro	December 19, 2025	"Ring" in the New Year	Unknown	1	<1	<1	This was at BDE's livestream show.	
18	Bigg Pound	December 19, 2025	"Ring" in the New Year	Unknown	4	<1	<1	This was at BDE's livestream show.	
19	KJ Reynolds	December 19, 2025	"Ring" in the New Year	Unknown	1	<1	<1	This was at BDE's livestream show.	
20	VYBE Crash Test Dummy	December 19, 2025	"Ring" in the New Year	Unknown	1	<1	<1	This was at BDE's livestream show.	
21	Bigg Pound	December 19, 2025	"Ring" in the New Year	Unknown	5	48	48	This was at BDE's livestream show.	
22	Trey Miguel	February 5, 2026	Kross Hour	Dayton, OH	1	77	77	This six-way match also featued Jeffrey John, Juni Underwood, Dante Leon, and Gringo Loco.	
23	Bigg Pound	April 23, 2026	N/A	Toledo, OH	6	50	50	Pound went to previous champion Trey Miguel's home to visit Miguel as he was nursing his broken patella. Taking advantage of Miguel's injury, Pound pinned Miguel to win the title.	
24	Crash	June 12, 2026	No Country for Ole Mancer	Dayton, OH	1	112	112	This four-way match also featured DreadKnot and Troy Parker.	
25	Gringo Loco	October 2, 2026	Tales from the Ring IX	Dayton, OH	1	44+	44+	This seven-way scramble also featured Bigg Pound, Harley Rock, Kiran Grey, Kristian Robinson, and Troy Parker.	

== Combined reigns ==
As of November 15, 2026.

†	Indicates the current champion
<1	Reign was less than a day

Rank	Wrestler	No. of reigns	Combined days	
Rank	Wrestler	No. of reigns	Actual	Recognized by Revolver
1	Matthew Palmer	1	274	
2	Caleb Konley	1	202	
3	Bigg Pound	6	174	
4	Crash	1	112	
5	Rich Swann	1	90	
6	Clayton Gainz	1	84	
7	Ace Austin	1	78	
8	Trey Miguel	1	77	
8	Wrestling Tent	1	77	
10	Jake Manning	1	70	
11	Joey Ryan	1	50	—
12	Gringo Loco †	1	44+	
13	Jordan Len-X	1	41	
14	AR Fox	1	33	
15	John Skyler	1	8	
16	Jason Cade	1	1	
17	"Jarren" SmallAfro	1	<1	
17	Johnnie Crist	1	<1	
17	KJ Reynolds	1	<1	
17	Rachel Armstrong	1	<1	
17	VYBE Crash Test Dummy	1	<1	
