= Lio Rush =

American professional wrestler (born 1994)

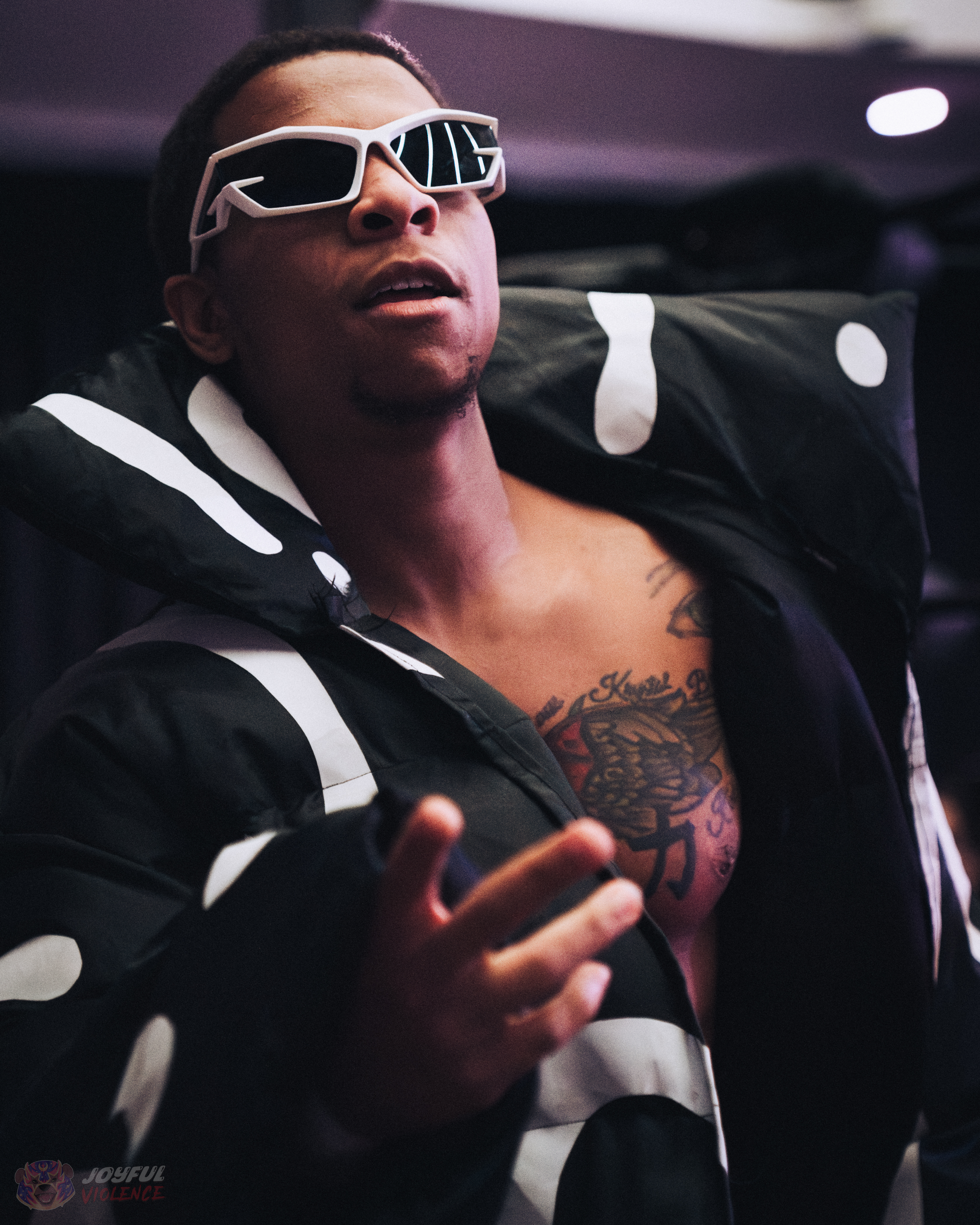
- Rush in February 2024

Personal information
- Born: Lionel Gerard Green; November 11, 1994 (age 31) Lanham, Maryland, U.S.
- Spouse: Sarah Lai Wah (m. 2018)
- Children: 3

Professional wrestling career
- Ring names: Aracno; Lennon Duffy; LI Green; Lio Rush
- Billed height: 5 ft 6 in (1.68 m)
- Billed weight: 160 lb (73 kg)
- Billed from: Washington, D.C.
- Trained by: MCW Training Center; WWE Performance Center
- Debut: November 2014

Lionel Gerard Green (born November 11, 1994), better known by the ring name Lio Rush, is an American professional wrestler and rapper. He is signed to All Elite Wrestling (AEW) and its sister promotion Ring of Honor (ROH), where he is a former ROH World Television Champion. He also makes sporadic appearances for the independent circuit.

He is also known for his time in New Japan Pro-Wrestling (NJPW) and WWE, where he was the youngest NXT Cruiserweight Champion, served as the manager of Bobby Lashley, and was the winner of the 2018 WWE United Kingdom Championship Invitational. He has also previously performed for Major League Wrestling (MLW), and Impact Wrestling, where he was a former Impact X Division Champion, and former MLW World Middleweight Champion, as well as for Lucha Libre AAA Worldwide (AAA), where he previously performed as Aracno, Ring of Honor (ROH), where he won the 2016 Top Prospect Tournament, and in Combat Zone Wrestling (CZW), where he won the CZW World Heavyweight Championship once and the CZW Wired Championship twice.

== Early life ==
Lionel Gerald Green was born in Lanham, Maryland to two gospel singers. His childhood bedroom sat above his father's recording studio. He remembered wanting to be a professional wrestler since he was five years old. In his youth, Green struggled with mental health, leading to a brief hospital stay during his teens.

== Professional wrestling career ==
=== Independent circuit (2014–2017) ===
Rush debuted under the ring name "LI Green", but after a negative response to the name from promoters, he changed it to "Lennon Duffy". He learned to wrestle during 2014 with MCW Training Center. He debuted at the 2014 Tribute to the Legends and created a tag team named "Sudden Impact" with Patrick Clark, who would go on to work for WWE as Velveteen Dream. On July 18, he won the Shane Shamrock Memorial Cup XV, defeating Brandon Scott, Drolix, Eddie Edwards, Matt Cross and Shane Strickland in a six-way elimination match. On October 3, he and his teammate Patrick Clark won the MCW Tag Team Championship, defeating The Hell Cats and The Ecktourage. They lost the title thirteen days later to The Ecktourage. He also competed for Evolve Wrestling where he defeated Fred Yehi on November 6. He lost his match against Ethan Page the following day. Lucha Libre Elite announced Rush as a participant in the Elite World Championship. On Thursday June 23, 2016, Rush defeated David Tita in the first day of the Elite World Championship to make the quarter final. On Saturday June 25, 2016, he was defeated by Michael Elgin. On February 18, 2017, Rush made his debut for Pro Wrestling Guerrilla at "Only Kings Understand Each Other", where he was defeated by Ricochet. On May 27, 2017, Rush defeated Ken Broadway at House of Glory's "Adrenaline" to capture the HOG Crown Jewel Championship, ending Broadway's almost year long reign. Rush lost the title to HOG World Heavyweight Champion Anthony Gangone in a title for title match at House of Glory's "Never Trust a Snake" on July 1.

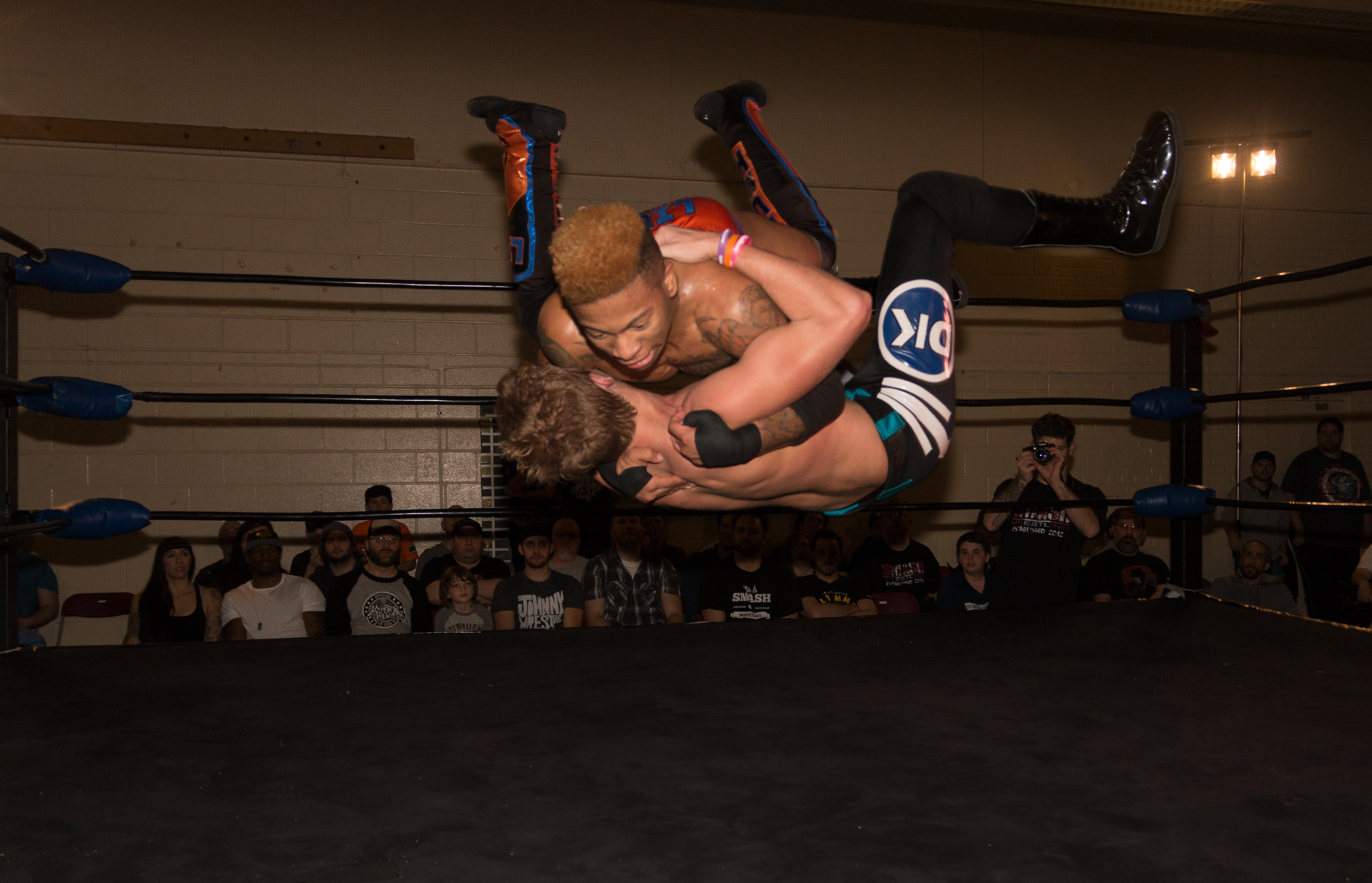
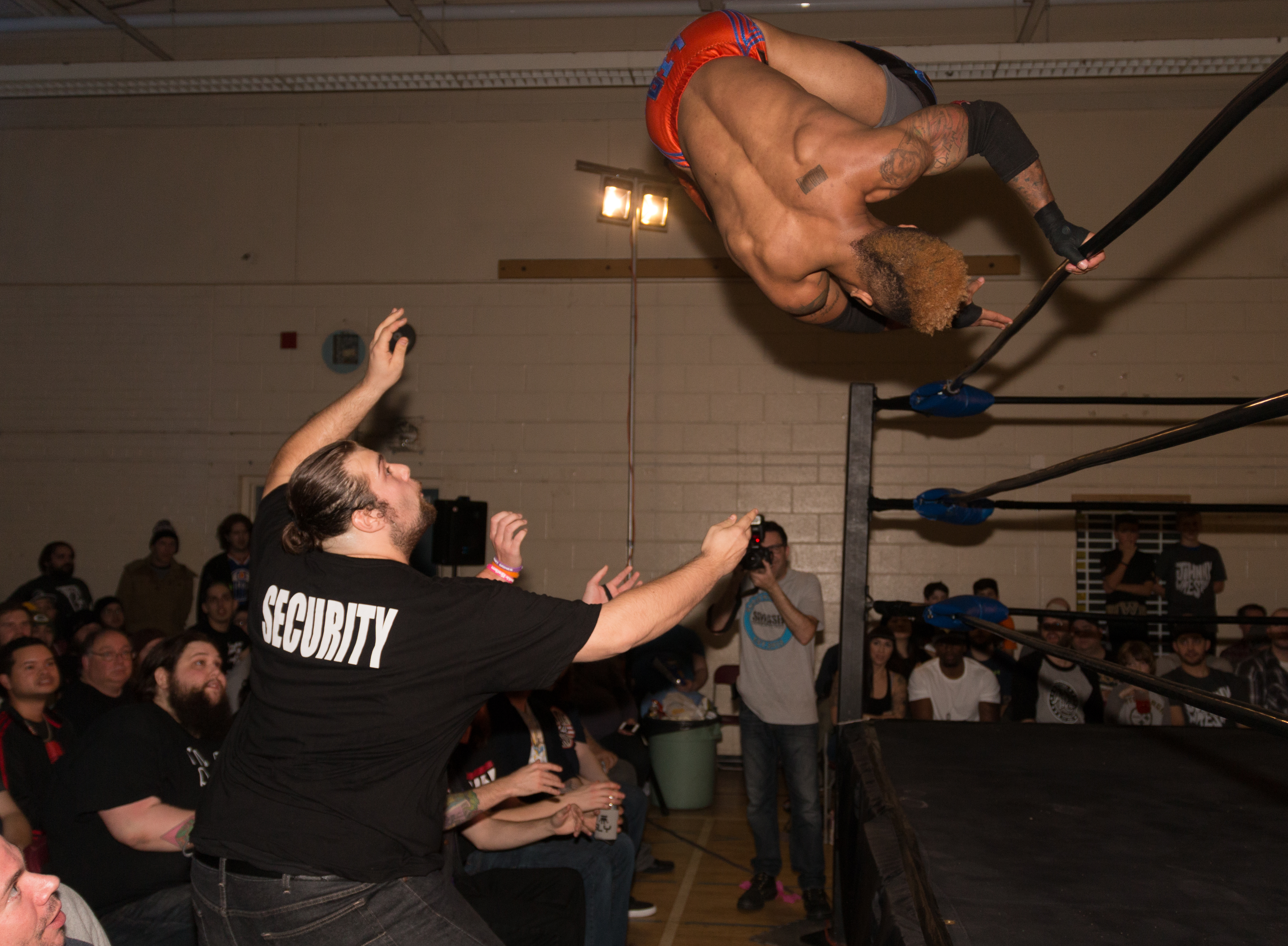
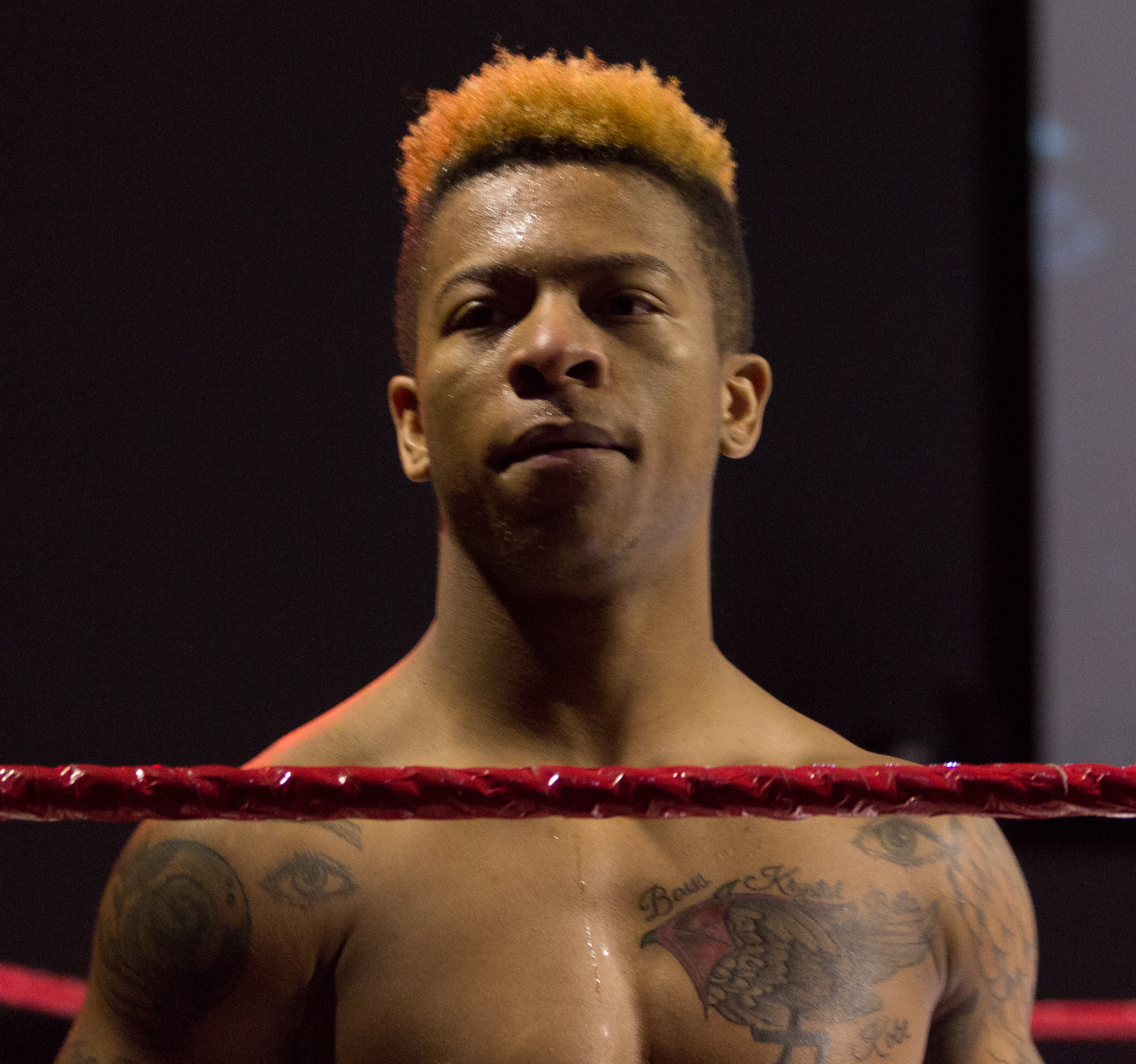
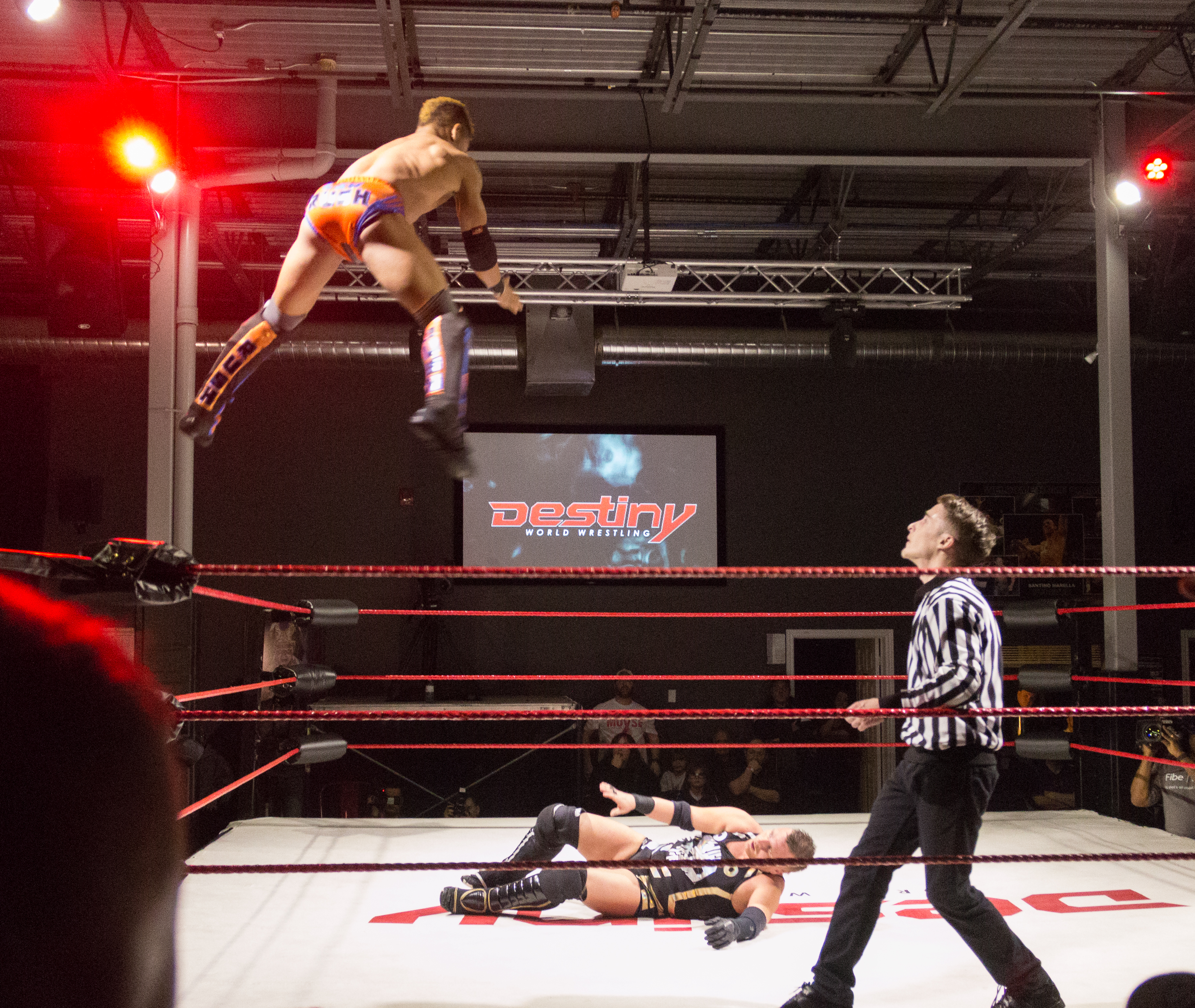
Lio Rush in action at a Smash Wrestling show in Etobicoke, ON in 2016.
& Lio Rush at a Destiny Wrestling show in Mississauga, ON in 2016.

=== Combat Zone Wrestling (2014–2017) ===
Green, as Lennon Duffy, made his debut for Combat Zone Wrestling (CZW) on December 31, 2014, defeating Slugger Clark. He and Clark began to compete together as known as Sudden Impact. On September 12, he changed his name to "Lio Rush" and started a feud with Joey Janela, where he faced him, Trevor Lee and Caleb Konley at Down With the Sickness 2015; the match was won by Janela. At Night of Infamy, on November 21, he wrestled Joey Janela for the CZW Wired Championship on a losing effort. On December 12, during Cage of Death XVII, he won the CZW Wired TV Championship, defeating Janela for the title. He made his first successful defense against Kevin Bennett on January 16. He lost his title against Joey Janela on February 13 at CZW Seventeen. On March 26, 2016, at CZW Proving Ground, Rush defeated Joey Janela, Dave Crist and David Starr to win the CZW Wired Championship. Rush lost the Wired title back to Janela in a Ladder Match at Down with The Sickness on September 10, 2016, After his feud with Janela was over he stepped out of the Wired Championship picture and started a feud with Sami Callihan becoming a heel in the process for the first time in his career and adopted a darker gimmick.

On May 13, 2017, Rush beat Joe Gacy for the CZW World Heavyweight Championship. He lost the belt to Davey Richards at a non-CZW (DEFY Wrestling) show, ending his reign at only 17 days. On July 8, Rush announced that he would be making his final CZW appearance on August 5. Rush defeated Janela at CZW Once in a Lifetime for his last match in CZW and against Janela.

=== Ring of Honor (2015–2017) ===
Six months after his professional wrestling debut, Rush took part in a Ring of Honor (ROH) training camp. He, however, was not signed due to his limited experience. After getting more experience wrestling on the independent circuit, Rush took part in another training camp and, now with the backing of Kevin Kelly, Steve Corino, Adam Cole, Jay Lethal and Kyle O'Reilly, was signed as a participant in the 2016 Top Prospect Tournament. Rush made his debut in ROH on December 19, 2015, beating Vinny Marseglia in a dark match. Rush went on to compete in the 2016 Top Prospect Tournament, defeating Jason Kincaid on January 9, going on to defeat Brian Fury on February 6 to win the tournament. On March 31, ROH announced that Rush had signed a contract with the promotion. On Supercard of Honor X Night 1 at April 1, 2016, Rush unsuccessfully challenged Jay Lethal for ROH World Championship. At Survival of the Fittest night one Rush defeated Misterioso Jr., Hangman Page and Sho in a Four corner survival match to be in the Survival of the Fittest tournament final. The Next night Rush was in the Survival of the Fittest match where he was the last to before he was eliminated by Bobby Fish. At Final Battle Rush replaced A. C. H. in the Six-man tag team tournament final to determine the first ROH World Six-Man Tag Team Champions where he teamed with Kushida and Jay White and was defeated by The Kingdom (Matt Taven, T. K. O'Ryan and Vinny Marseglia). In March 2017, it was reported that Rush had given his notice to ROH.

=== WWE (2017–2020) ===
==== NXT and 205 Live (2017–2018) ====
On July 9, 2017, it was reported that Rush had been offered a NXT contract and that his signing was imminent. WWE confirmed the signing on August 21. Rush made his first televised appearance on the October 4 episode of NXT, where he was attacked by Velveteen Dream (his former tag team partner Patrick Clark). On the October 11 episode of NXT, Rush was defeated by Dream in a match. On October 29, Rush joked on Twitter about Emma following her release from WWE; he received criticism from WWE wrestlers and issued an apology. The tweet resulted in Rush being pulled from all NXT events until November 30. He would make one additional appearance on NXT television, losing a squash match to Lars Sullivan. He was then off television again until April 2018.

In June 2018, Rush was moved to WWE's main roster as part of the cruiserweight division, appearing on 205 Live. He also established himself as a heel on 205 Live. Upon his debut, he went on a winning streak, defeating Noam Dar, Akira Tozawa and three jobbers. He suffered his first loss in a 5-way number one contendership match for the WWE Cruiserweight Championship, that was won by Tony Nese. He suffered his first pinfall loss to Cedric Alexander a few weeks later.

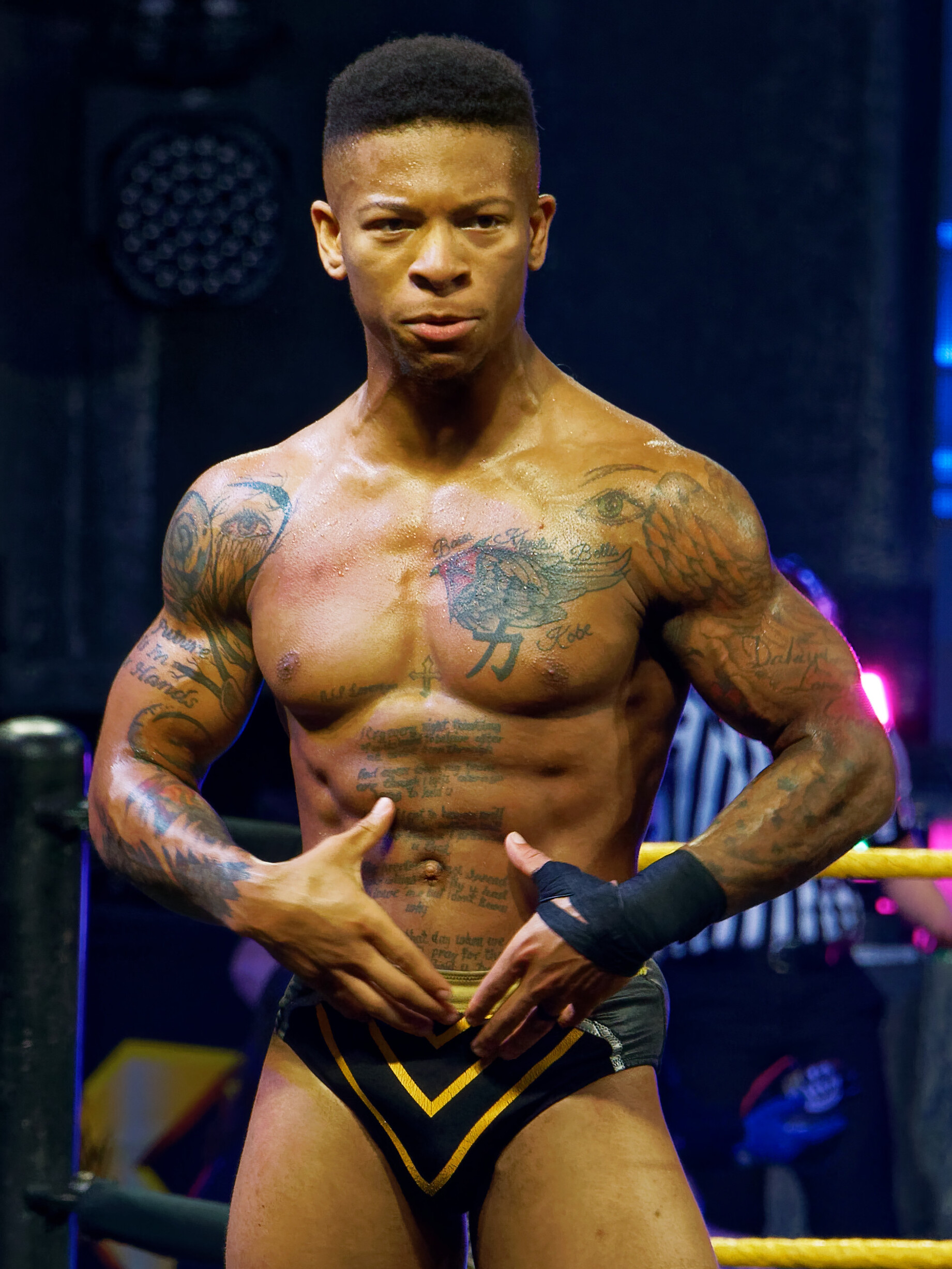
Lio Rush at a WWE NXT event in 2018.

==== Alliance with Bobby Lashley and hiatus (2018–2019) ====
On the September 17 episode of Raw, Rush became the hype man and manager of Bobby Lashley and was responsible for turning Lashley heel when he encouraged him to attack Kevin Owens multiple times after their match on October 8. Rush then would later help Bobby Lashley capture his first Intercontinental Championship in a triple threat match against Seth Rollins and defending champion Dean Ambrose, when Rush distracted Rollins, allowing Lashley to spear Ambrose and pin him for the title.

Following the Royal Rumble, Rush and Lashley began feuding with Finn Bálor. His last match on 205 Live would be a number one contendership fatal four way on February 5, 2019, that was won by Akira Tozowa. Lashley's feud with Balor lead to a 2-on-1 handicap match at Elimination Chamber for Lashley's title, where Rush was ultimately pinned by Bálor, resulting in Lashley losing the Intercontinental Championship. After the match Lashley attacked Rush, leaving him laying in the ring. The next day, Rush and Lashley were defeated by Finn Balor and the debuting Ricochet. The next week, Rush unsuccessfully challenged Balor for the Intercontinental Championship. However, on the March 11 episode of Raw, Rush helped Lashley to regain the Intercontinental Championship from Balor. The following week, Braun Strowman and Balor defeated Lashley and Rush in a tag team match. Near the end of the match, Lashley fled the ring, leaving Rush to be pinned by Strowman. Following that, he did not wrestle for the company and stopped appearing alongside Lashley after WrestleMania 35 in April. Following the April 15 Raw, Rush started an imposed sabbatical away from WWE.

Lio Rush in August 2018.

Amidst reports in May that Rush has backstage "heat" over issues regarding his attitude, including reports that he was disrespecting veterans, on May 15, Rush removed all mentions of WWE on his social media and replaced it with an email for booking inquiries. The problem has been chalked up to be a possible misunderstanding, due to Rush not adhering by the unwritten rules of the professional wrestling industry. In June, he started posting vignettes on Twitter seemingly promoting a return, while PWInsider reported that he was headed back to NXT.

==== NXT Cruiserweight Champion (2019–2020) ====
Rush made his return to NXT, where he won the Cruiserweight Champion from Drew Gulak on October 9 episode of NXT. At Survivor Series, Rush successfully defended his NXT Cruiserweight Championship in an Interbrand Triple Threat match that featured Akira Tozawa and Kalisto. On the December 11 episode of NXT, Rush lost his title to Angel Garza, ending his reign at 63 days. He tried to regain the title facing the new champion Jordan Devlin on February 19 episode of NXT, in which he failed to capture the Cruiserweight title. On April 15, 2020, Rush was released from his WWE contract as part of budget cuts stemming from the COVID-19 pandemic.

=== Return to the independent circuit (2020–present) ===
After leaving WWE, Rush began to work with many independent promotions, most notably Game Changer Wrestling, where he had several matches. In November, he signed a contract with the Major League Wrestling promotion. Also in November, he was announced for New Japan Pro-Wrestling's Super J-Cup tournament, which took place on USA. After failing to win the Super J-Cup, he was defeated by El Phantasmo at New Japan's The New Beginning USA. Rush first match with MLW took place at Kings of Colosseum on January 6, 2021, where he defeated Myron Reed to win the World Middleweight Championship. One month later, due to MLW relationship with Lucha Libre AAA Worldwide, Rush defeated Laredo Kid to win the AAA World Cruiserweight Championship and became a double champion. However this reign was not recognized in Mexico by AAA, with AAA booker Konnan stating that Lio lost the title to Laredo during an untelevised event.

=== All Elite Wrestling (2021–2022) ===
On May 30, 2021, Rush made an appearance for All Elite Wrestling at the Double or Nothing pay-per-view during the Casino Battle Royale match as the "Joker", where he was eliminated by Matt Hardy with help from Private Party. On June 9, Rush announced he had suffered a shoulder injury during the Casino Battle Royale match and that while AEW had offered him a contract, he was choosing to retire from professional wrestling once his injury healed and he had fulfilled his contractual obligations with NJPW. On September 29, Rush— who had decided not to go through with his original plans to retire— officially signed with AEW. He made his AEW Dynamite debut on November 10, 2021 (along with his new tag team partner, Dante Martin) in a winning effort against the team of Matt Sydal and Lee Moriarty. On January 22, 2022, Rush revealed that his AEW contract was set to expire February 14, 2022, and became a free agent on that date.

=== New Japan Pro-Wrestling (2021–2024) ===
Lio Rush made his New Japan Pro-Wrestling (NJPW) debut at the Super J-Cup. After that, he went on to suffer a few losses from El Phantasmo. After a victory over Rocky Romero, Rush qualified for the New Japan Cup USA 2021 before making headlines once he and Yoh went on to win the Super Junior Tag League the following year and will face the IWGP Junior Heavyweight Tag Team Champions, TJP and Francesco Akira at Wrestle Kingdom 17.

At Wrestle Kingdom 17 on January 4, 2023 Rush and Yoh were unsuccessful at winning the IWGP Junior Heavyweight Tag Team Champions from Catch 2/2. On March 21, Rush unsuccessfully challenged Hiromu Takahashi for the IWGP Junior Heavyweight Championship. On April 27, Rush was announced as an entrant in the Best of the Super Juniors 30 tournament, competing in the A block. Rush finished the tournament with 12 points, narrowly missing out on advancing to the semi-finals, although avenging a loss against Takahashi. In a December 2023 interview with WrestlePurists, Rush revealed that a deal with NJPW had fallen through and he was still a free agent.

=== Impact Wrestling (2023) ===
On March 30, 2023, Rush made his Impact Wrestling debut against Kushida in a one-on-one match at Impact Wrestling Multiverse United of year 2023 in a very impressive matchup but was not successful as he lost via submission. On June 23, Rush returned to Impact Wrestling to team Nick Aldis to defeat The Motor City Machine Guns, Alex Shelley and Chris Sabin for the Summer Sizzler event. Afterwards on the June 29, 2023 episode of Impact! Lio and Aldis dominated and attacked The Motor City Machine Guns during a segment (This segment was filmed, taped and aired before the tag team match), thus establishing himself as a heel in the process. On June 30, it was announced that Rush will challenge Sabin for the Impact X Division Championship at Slammiversary. During this match Rush was victorious and became the Impact X Division Champion for the first time in his career.At Emergence, Rush, Bully Ray, Brian Myers, and Moose defeated Josh Alexander and Time Machine (Alex Shelley, Chris Sabin and Kushida). At Victory Road, Rush defeated Kushida to retain the title. At Impact 1000, Rush lost the title to Chris Sabin, thus marking his final appearance for the company.

=== Return to AEW / ROH (2024–present) ===
==== CRU (2024–2026) ====
On the May 29, 2024 episode of Dynamite, Rush returned to AEW for the first time since 2021, as a participant in the Casino Gauntlet Match to earn an AEW World Championship match at Forbidden Door, which was won by Will Ospreay. He worked for AEW and ROH until he announced he was signed with AEW on October 12..

Rush worked with Action Andretti under the tag team name CRU, facing the AEW World Tag Team Champions Private Party (Isiah Kassidy and Marq Quen) on January 4, 2025. On January 18 at the Maximum Carnage special episode of Collision, Rush and Andretti attacked Top Flight, cementing their heel turn. On the January 8, 2026 episode of ROH on HonorClub, Rush and Andretti added Lacey Lane to CRU.

==== "Blackheart" (2026–present) ====
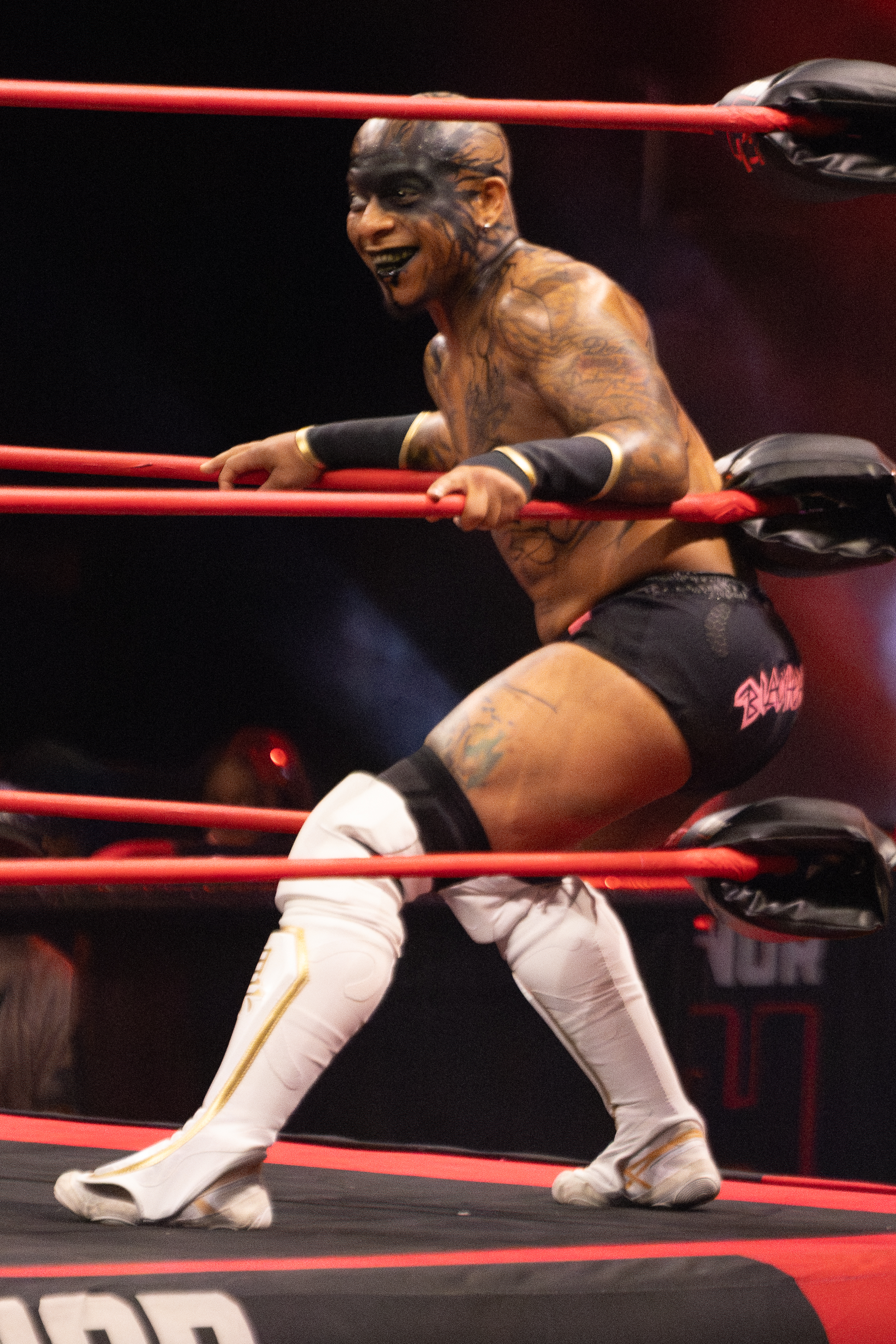
Rush with his "Blackheart" alter ego in May 2026

In March 2026, Rush adopted his "Blackheart" persona, a demonic character that he previously used on the independent scene. In the following months as the "Blackheart", CRU would disband and Rush won the ROH World Television Championship at Global Wars from AR Fox on June 13 (aired June 18). After winning the title, Rush introduced a custom belt design that featured the same plates, only they are painted black and on a warped black leather strap. At Forbidden Door on June 28, Rush would turn face after assisting Team Mark Briscoe against Team DCMJF in their steel cage match. On August 21 at Death Before Dishonor, Rush lost his title to Action Andretti in a Fight Without Honor, ending his reign at 69 days (though ROH recognizes his reign at 64 days).

=== Consejo Mundial de Lucha Libre (2025) ===
On June 17, 2025, CRU made their Consejo Mundial de Lucha Libre (CMLL) debut at Martes de Arena Mexico event where they unsuccessfully challenged Los Nuevos Ingobernables (Ángel de Oro and Niebla Roja) for the CMLL World Tag Team Championship.

== Music career ==
In July 2019, Rush released his debut single as a rapper titled, "Scenic Lullaby". According to Rush, the song is a "first-person account of [his] darkest days and the pain he continues to carry." Rush released his second single, "I Wonder", on August 19. On his 25th birthday, Rush released his debut extended play, 11:11. On May 11, 2020, Rush released his debut studio album, titled Ever After. On July 20, 2020, Rush released his second studio album, The Final Match.

On September 28, 2021, Rush released his second EP, titled Not Found.

== Professional wrestling style and persona ==
Rush is known for his fast-paced high-flying style. He is nicknamed the "Man of the Hour" and the "[his age at the time]-Year-Old Piece of Gold". During Rush's early days in WWE's main roster, he became a heel manager for Bobby Lashley, a role he was praised for due to his speaking skills. He cited actor and comedian Kevin Hart as his influence to his work as manager.

Rush's "Blackheart" persona is markedly different than his usual style. As the "Blackheart", Rush wears colored eye contacts and dyes his teeth to appear to be evil or sinister. Rush rarely speaks in complete sentences, usually speaking in the third person and in a fragmented, sporadic voice. This persona has frequently been compared to the fictional character Gollum.

== Other media ==
Rush made his video game debut as part of the Rising Stars Pack of downloadable content created for WWE 2K19.

In 2020, Rush was announced as a contestant on the thirty-sixth season of MTV's reality competition series The Challenge and was initially paired with Love Island alumna Gabby Allen. He left the show on his own accord in episode 6, citing mental health reasons and the stress of the house triggering his childhood feelings of living in a group home.

== Personal life ==
Green resides in Los Angeles, California with his three sons and his wife, Sarah Lai Wah, whom he married on December 21, 2018, in Las Vegas, Nevada. He has numerous tattoos, one of which that he has on his stomach is a poem that was written by his mother for his late brother Lorenzo, who died at a young age. Green stated that he did not know about his brother until he was told about him by his mother on his first day of high school.

== Discography ==
=== Studio albums ===
List of studio albums, with selected details
Title	Album details
Ever After	Released: May 11, 2020; Formats: Digital download, streaming
The Final Match	Released: July 20, 2020; Formats: Digital download, streaming

=== Extended plays ===
List of extended plays, with selected details
Title	EP details
11:11	Released: November 11, 2019; Formats: Digital download, streaming
Not Found	Released: September 28, 2021; Formats: Digital download, streaming

=== Singles ===
==== As lead artist ====
List of singles as a lead artist, showing year released and album name
Title	Year	Album
"Scenic Lullaby"	2019	Non-album single
"I Wonder"	2019	Ever After
"Har Gow" (featuring J-Reyez)	2020	Non-album singles
"On My Own" (featuring Marlon Ponce)	2020	Non-album singles
"Mask Off" (with Marlon Ponce)	2020	Non-album singles
"Heat" (Remix) (featuring Real1)	2020	Non-album singles
"Do You Remember"	2020	Non-album singles
"Candle Lights" (with Lvndie)	2021	Non-album singles
"Off the Top"	2021	Non-album singles
"Best Thing Out"	2021	Non-album singles

==== As featured artist ====
List of singles as a featured artist, showing year released and album name
Title	Year	Album
"Money Money" (DRETT1 featuring Lio)	2018	Non-album singles
"Feel the Rush" (Wrestle and Flow featuring Lio)	2020	Non-album singles
"Shine" (DRETT1 featuring Lio and K001)	2020	Non-album singles
"Stone Cold" (Jay Starrett featuring Joseph Allen, Lio and imSwervy)	2021	Non-album singles
"Higher" (James Kennedy featuring Lio)	2021	Non-album singles

=== Music videos ===
List of music videos, showing year released and directors
Title	Year	Director(s)	Ref.
As lead artist
"Scenic Lullaby"	2019	David Daudin	
"I Wonder"	2019	David Daudin	
"The Cypher" (with Briana Brandy and Josiah Williams)	2019	Unknown	
"Lost"	2020	Xavier the Filmmaker	
"Never Hitting the Ground"	2020	Xavier the Filmmaker	
"IDEK"	2020	Xavier the Filmmaker	
"Craved For Blood"	2020	Xavier the Filmmaker	
"Oh My Freestyle"	2020	Xavier the Filmmaker	
"Do You Remember"	2020	VisualOPM	
"Off the Top"	2021	YoungOneStudio	
"Best Thing Out"	2021	YoungOneStudio	
As featured artist
"Money Money" (DRETT1 featuring Lio)	2018	David Daudin	
"Feel the Rush" (Wrestle and Flow featuring Lio)	2020	Xavier the Filmmaker	
"Stone Cold" (Jay Starrett featuring Joseph Allen, Lio and imSwervy)	2021	Parker Donaldson	

== Championships and accomplishments ==
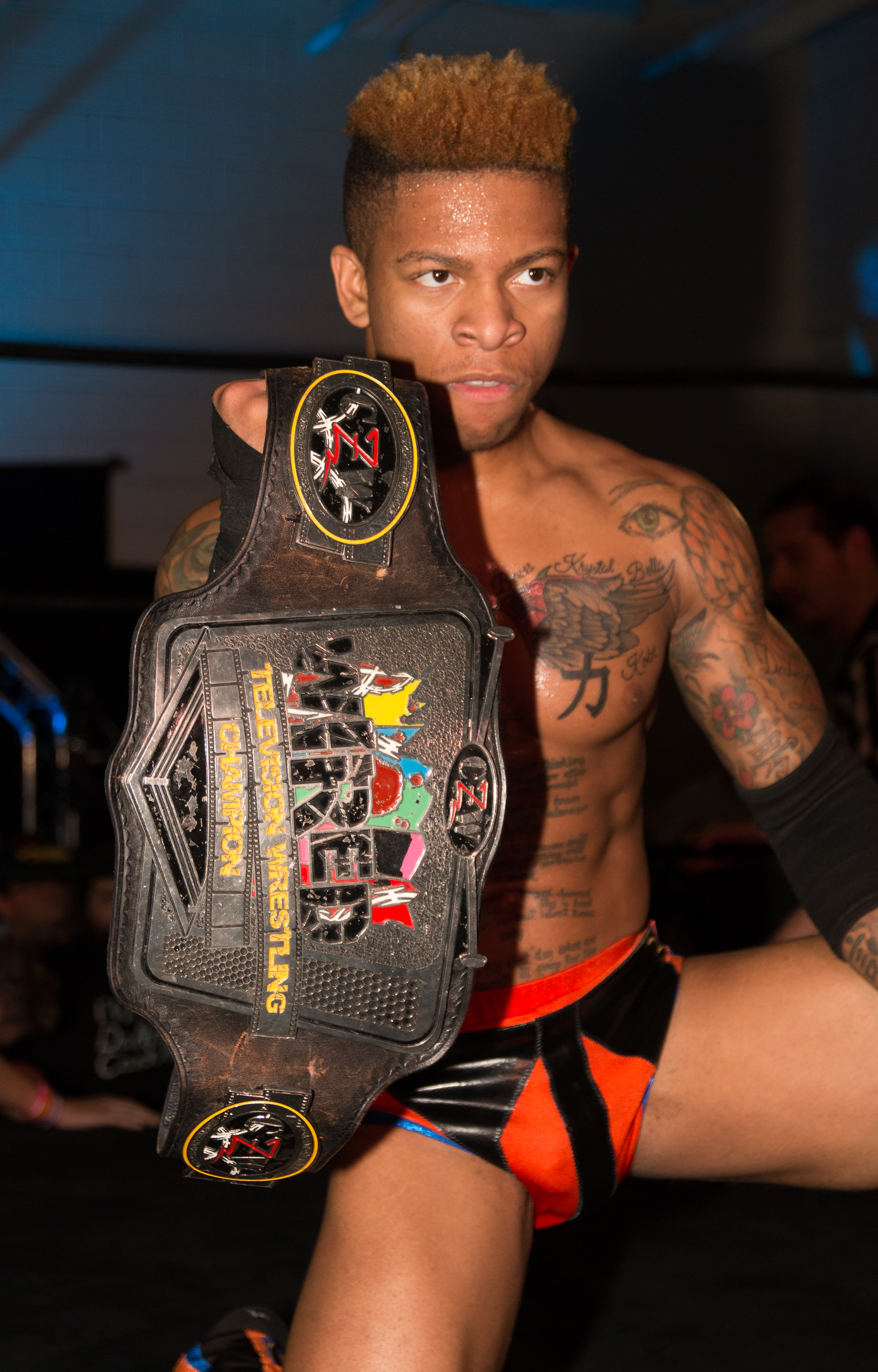
Rush with the CZW Wired Championship

- Lucha Libre AAA Worldwide
  - AAA World Cruiserweight Championship (1 time, unrecognized)
- Combat Zone Wrestling
  - CZW World Heavyweight Championship (1 time)
  - CZW Wired Championship (2 times)
- DDT Pro-Wrestling
  - Ironman Heavymetalweight Championship (1 time)
- House of Glory
  - HOG Crown Jewel Championship (1 time)
  - HOG Cruiserweight Championship (1 time, current)
- Major League Wrestling
  - MLW World Middleweight Championship (1 time)
- Impact Wrestling
  - Impact X Division Championship (1 time)
- Maryland Championship Wrestling / MCW Pro Wrestling
  - MCW Rage Championship (1 time)
  - MCW Tag Team Championship (1 time) – with Patrick Clark
  - Shane Shamrock Memorial Cup (2015, 2016)
- New Japan Pro-Wrestling
  - Super Jr. Tag League (2022) – with Yoh
- House Of Pain Wrestling Federation
  - HoPWF Xcellence Championship (1 time)
- Pro Wrestling Illustrated
  - Ranked No. 53 of the top 500 singles wrestlers in the PWI 500 in 2021
- Revolution Pro Wrestling
  - British J-Cup (2024)
- Ring of Honor
  - ROH World Television Championship (1 time)
  - Top Prospect Tournament (2016)
- Tigers Pro Wrestling
  - TPW Proud Championship (1 time)
- WWE
  - NXT Cruiserweight Championship (1 time)
  - WWE United Kingdom Championship invitational (2018)
