= CZW Wired Championship =

Professional wrestling championship

Details
- Promotion: Combat Zone Wrestling (CZW)
- Date established: December 12, 2009
- Date retired: 2021

Other names
- CZW Wired TV Championship; CZW World Wired Championship
Statistics
- First champion: Tyler Veritas
- Final champion: KC Navarro
- Most reigns: A. R. Fox, Joe Gacy and Joey Janela (3 reigns)
- Longest reign: Drew Gulak (429 days)
- Shortest reign: Ace Austin (1 day)
- Oldest champion: Blackwater (33 years)
- Youngest champion: Jordan Oliver (19 years, 117 days)
- Heaviest champion: Joe Gacy (249 lb)
- Lightest champion: KC Navarro (134 lb)

The CZW Wired Championship was a professional wrestling world television championship in the Combat Zone Wrestling (CZW) promotion.

== History ==
Throughout the championship's history, there were 28 reigns between 20 champions. The inaugural champion was Tyler Veritas. The oldest champion was Blackwater, winning the title at 33 years old, while the youngest champion was Jordan Oliver when he won it at 19. A. R. Fox, Joe Gacy and Joey Janela were tied for the most reigns at three. Drew Gulak's sole reign was the longest reign at 429 days, while Ace Austin' reign was the shortest at 1 day.

=== Inaugural tournament (2009) ===
First Round; September 12; October 10
Drew Gulak	Pin
Ryan Slater
LJ Cruz
Tyler Veritas	Pin
Adam Cole	Pin
Alex Colon
Joe Gacy
Rich Swann	Pin

Semifinals; November 14
Drew Gulak
Tyler Veritas	Pin
Adam Cole	Pin
Rich Swann

Finals; December 12
Tyler Veritas	Pin
Adam Cole

== Reigns ==
Key
No.	Overall reign number
Reign	Reign number for the specific champion
Days	Number of days held

No.	Champion	Championship change			Reign statistics		Notes	Ref.
No.	Champion	Date	Event	Location	Reign	Days	Notes	Ref.
1	Tyler Veritas	December 12, 2009	Cage Of Death XI	Philadelphia, PA	1	119	Defeated Adam Cole in a tournament final to become the inaugural champion.	
2	Drew Gulak	April 10, 2010	Swingin For The Fences	Philadelphia, PA	1	429		
3	A. R. Fox	June 13, 2011	Prelude To Violence 2	Philadelphia, PA	1	26		
4	Jake Crist	July 9, 2011	New Heights	Philadelphia, PA	1	280		
5	Dave Crist	April 14, 2012	CZW Best of the Best 11	Voorhees, NJ	1	147		
6	A. R. Fox	September 8, 2012	Down with the Sickness	Voorhees, NJ	2	371	This was a Chri$ Ca$h Memorial title unification ladder match, in which Fox also defended his CZW Junior Heavyweight Championship.	
7	Alex Colon	September 14, 2013	Down With The Sickness	Voorhees, NJ	1	119	This was a Chri$ Ca$h Memorial four way ladder match, also involving Andrew Everett and Shane Strickland.	
8	Devon Moore	January 11, 2014	Answering The Challenge	Voorhees, NJ	1	56		
9	Shane Strickland	March 8, 2014	High Stakes 5	Voorhees, NJ	1	144		
10	Joe Gacy	July 30, 2014	Dojo Wars	Blackwood, NJ	1	14		
11	Shane Strickland	August 13, 2014	Dojo Wars 7	Blackwood, NJ	2	122		
12	Joe Gacy	December 13, 2014	Cage of Death XVI	Voorhees, NJ	2	200		
13	Frankie Pickard	July 1, 2015	Dojo Wars 34	Blackwood, NJ	1	7		
14	Joe Gacy	July 8, 2015	Dojo Wars 35	Blackwood, NJ	3	3		
15	Tim Donst	July 11, 2015	New Heights	Philadelphia, PA	1	91		
16	Joey Janela	October 10, 2015	Tangled Web 8	Voorhees, NJ	1	63		
17	Lio Rush	December 12, 2015	Cage of Death XVII	Voorhees, NJ	1	63		
18	Joey Janela	February 13, 2016	Seventeen	Voorhees, NJ	2	42	Defeated Rush in a two out of three falls match.	
19	Lio Rush	March 26, 2016	Proving Grounds 2016	Voorhees, NJ	2	168	Won title in a four-way match also involving Dave Crist and David Starr.	
20	Joey Janela	September 10, 2016	Down With The Sickness	Voorhees, NJ	3	197	This was a ladder match.	
21	YUMA	March 26, 2017	Championship Wrestling From Hollywood	Port Hueneme, CA	1	48	Won title at Championship Wrestling From Hollywood taping.	
22	Maxwell Jacob Friedman	May 13, 2017	Sacrifices	Voorhees, NJ	1	336	Joey Janela defeated MJF at CZW The Wolf of Wrestling 2018 on October 14th. MJF defeats Joey Janela at CZW Cage of Death 19 on December 9th, 2018. By virtue of the victory, Janela's victory and Wired Title win were voided leaving MJF still undefeated.	
—	Vacated	April 14, 2018	Best of The Best 17	Sewell, NJ	—	—	Stripped of the title by D.J. Hyde due to throwing the belt to the ground.	
23	Zachary Wentz	May 12, 2018	Prelude To Violence	Voorhees, NJ	1	118	Defeated Alex Reynolds, John Silver and Wheeler Yuta in a four-way elimination match to win the vacant title.	
24	Ace Austin	September 7, 2018	Rockstar Pro Weekend At Murray's	Dayton, OH	1	1	This was a three-way match also contested for Austin's PWR Scramble Title and Alex Colon's DTU Alto Impacto Title.	
25	Blackwater	September 8, 2018	Down With The Sickness	Voorhees, NJ	1	35	This was a four-way match also involving Jordan Oliver and KC Navarro.	
26	Jordan Oliver	October 13, 2018	Better Than Our Best	Voorhees, NJ	1	427		
27	A. R. Fox	December 14, 2019	Cage Of Death XXI	Voorhees, NJ	3	56		
28	KC Navarro	February 8, 2020	21st Anniversary	Voorhees, NJ	1			
—		2021	—	—				

== Combined reigns ==
Rank	Wrestler	No. of reigns	Combined days
1	A. R. Fox	3	453
2	Drew Gulak	1	429
3	Jordan Oliver	1	427
4	Maxwell Jacob Friedman	1	336
5	Joey Janela	3	302
6	Jake Crist	1	280
7	Shane Strickland	2	266
8	Lio Rush	2	231
9	Joe Gacy	3	217
10	Dave Crist	1	147
11	Alex Colon	1	119
11	Tyler Veritas	1	119
13	Zachary Wentz	1	118
14	Tim Donst	1	91
15	Devon Moore	1	56
16	YUMA	1	48
17	Blackwater	1	35
18	Frankie Pickard	1	7
19	Ace Austin	1	1
20	KC Navarro	1	–
