= Conrad Kennedy III =

American professional wrestler (born 1977)

Krimson
Personal information
- Born: Justin Carnes; February 5, 1977 (age 49) Greenwich, Connecticut, U.S.

Professional wrestling career
- Ring name(s): Conrad Kennedy III; Conrad Kennedy; Conrad Carr; Conrad Borne; Krimson
- Billed height: 6 ft 1 in (1.85 m)
- Billed weight: 235 lb (107 kg)
- Billed from: Greenwich, Connecticut; The Broken Mirror
- Trained by: Joe E. Legend; Scott D'Amore
- Debut: May 2000

Justin Carnes (born February 5, 1977) is an American professional wrestler. He wrestles for Northwest Ohio Wrestling as Krimson.

== Professional wrestling career ==
=== Independent circuit (2000–present) ===
In his debut match in May 2000, Kennedy teamed with Rip Malibu to face Brutus Beefcake and Greg Valentine at an MWF show in Toledo, Ohio. Kennedy has worked for such promotions as Cleveland All–Pro Wrestling (CAPW), Border City Wrestling and All American Wrestling. On June 2, 2004, Kennedy lost to Chris Sabin on an episode of TNA Xplosion.

In March 2005, Kennedy won the Independent Wrestling Revolution Heavyweight Championship by defeating N8 Mattson in an Iron Man Cage match. The following year, in July, he won the Mid-West Heavyweight Championship by again defeating Mattson. On May 6, 2007, CAPW Television Championship by defeating Jason Bane. He successfully defended the title against Jake Crist and Chris Cronus throughout the end of 2007.

==== Ring of Honor (2006) ====
Kennedy made his Ring of Honor debut on April 29, 2006, as Colt Cabana's tag team partner which saw them both defeat the tag team The Irish Airborne. On June 23, 2006, Kennedy was placed in an ROH Pure Championship title match against then-champion Nigel McGuinness in a losing effort. The next day, Kennedy teamed up with Jimmy Rave as a one-time member of The Embassy and both were managed by Prince Nana in their match against The Briscoe Brothers. Rave and Kennedy would lose the match to the Briscoes.

==== All American Wrestling (2007–2008) ====
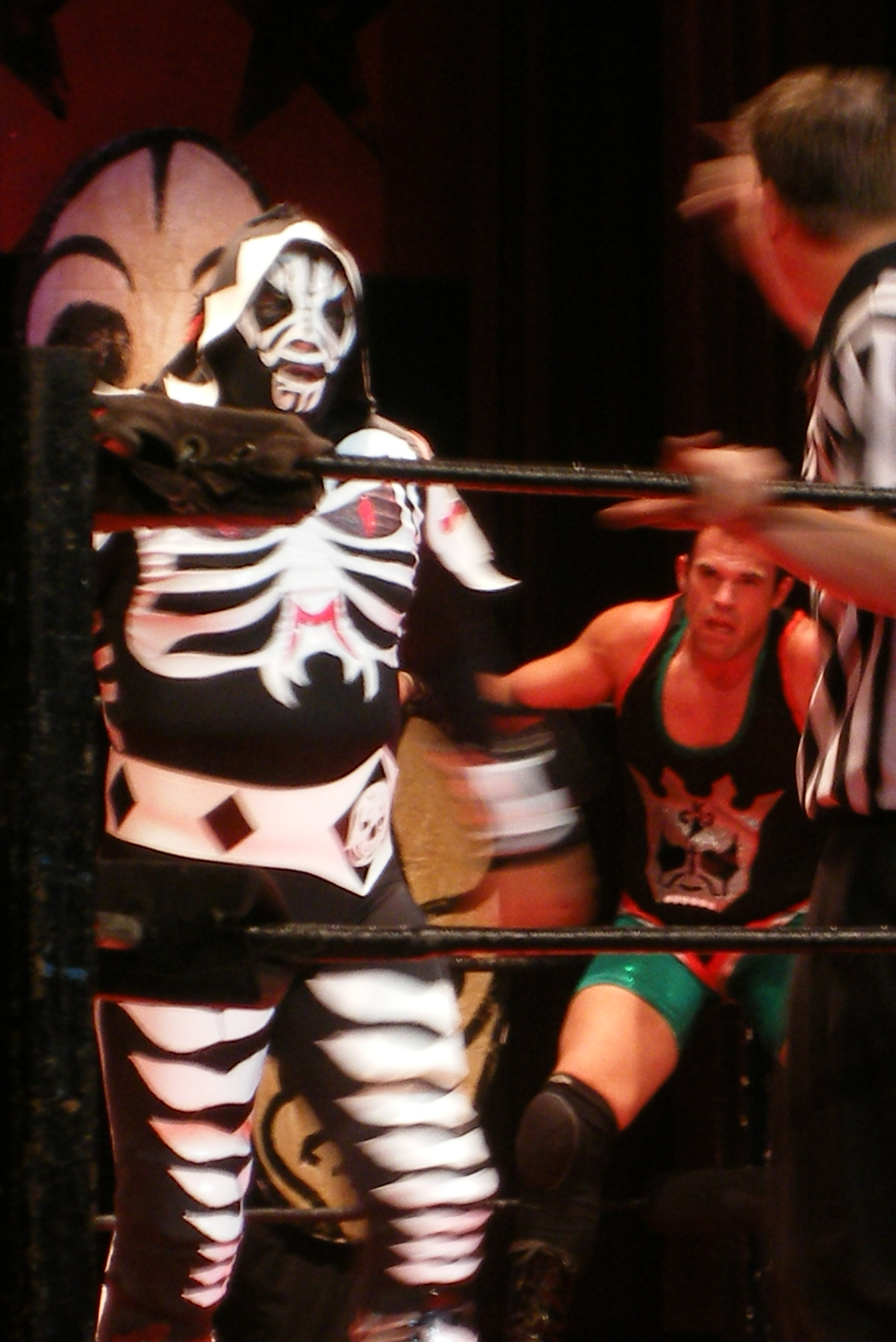
Kennedy (right) facing La Parka in 2007.

Kennedy made his first appearance in All American Wrestling (AAW) on February 17, 2007, at My Bloody Valentine '07, teaming with Trik Davis to defeat the team of Shane Hollister and Bryce Benjamin. on May 19, "DP Associates" (Kennedy, David and B. J. Whitmer) defeated Eric Priest, Ryan Boz and Dan Lawrence. On June 16, the DP Associates team of Kennedy and Davis beat Zach Gowen and Krotch, Dan Lawrence and Ryan Boz, and The Michigan Invasion (Truth Martini and N8 Mattson) in a four-way tag team match to win the AAW Tag Team Championship. After successful defenses against Absolute Answer (Caden Ames and Chris Able) and American History Next (Hardcore Craig and Steve Stone), they dropped the championship to The Motor City Machine Guns (Chris Sabin and Alex Shelley) on September 8. Kennedy and Davis kept competing in the AAW tag team division, and on October 20, were unsuccessful in regaining the Tag Team Championship in a two ou of three falls match. DP Associates were supposed to face The Michigan Invasion (Truth Martini and N8 Mattson) on December 18, but Kennedy was unable to make the show after he flight was cancelled, so Davis wrestled on his own in a handicap match, but lost. Kennedy made his final AAW appearance at My Bloody Valentine '08 on February 9, 2008, when he and Davis lost to Zach Gowen and Krotch.

==== Juggalo Championship Wrestling (2008–2009, 2014–2015) ====
Kennedy debuted in Juggalo Championship Wrestling during season 2 of its internet wrestling show SlamTV!. Along with his partner Zach Gowen, Kennedy participated in the "SlamTV! Tag Team Title Tournament" for the vacant JCW Tag Team Championship. In the second episode, Human Tornado, former partner of Gowen in The Pimp and Gimp Connection, saw heel manager Scott D'Amore leaving Kennedy's dressing room and grew suspicious. Later that night, Kennedy and Gowen defeated The Thomaselli Brothers to advance to the semi-finals of the tournament.

Following a loss in their next match against The Bloody Brothers, Kennedy turned on Gowen. Human Tornado ran into the ring, forcing Kennedy to retreat to the stage, where Scott D'Amore met with him. Later, D'Amore proclaimed that he was going to create a stable, starting with the members Kennedy and Kowabata, which was going to reform JCW. The team defeated The Ring Rydas on the following episode. A match was then set for Bloodymania II where The Pimp and Gimp Connection would face Kennedy and a mystery partner. The match, however, never occurred because Gowen legitimately no-showed the event. Kennedy competed the rest of his tenure as a singles competitor.

In 2014 Kennedy now under the ring name Krimson returned to JCW in a losing effort to 2 Tuff Tony.

=== World Wrestling Entertainment (2007, 2008) ===
In 2007, Kennedy would make three appearances in World Wrestling Entertainment, using the name Conrad Carr on an episode of Heat in a losing effort to Carlito. Kennedy, under the name Conrad Bourne, would make his second appearance four days later, tagging with Jake Adams in another losing effort against Jesse and Festus on SmackDown!. On May 12, 2008, Kennedy appeared on Heat using his "CK3" nickname in another losing effort, this time to "Hacksaw" Jim Duggan.

== Legal disputes with TNA ==
Carnes has claimed that Total Nonstop Action Wrestling used his gimmicks without compensating him on multiple occasions.

In 2011, he sent a letter to TNA President Dixie Carter. In this letter he claimed that TNA had received several promos from him, as Krimson and later Villain, portraying a character akin to The Joker in The Dark Knight; TNA later used the Krimson name for another wrestler, and used the Joker-like face paint for Sting's reinvented gimmick. According to Carnes, he had received rejections by bookers due to his similarities to both of these wrestlers.

In 2016, he sent a cease and desist letter to TNA, objecting to the portrayal of Crazzy Steve (a crazed clown character) as being similar to his Krimson/Villain gimmick, and the Decay stable as being like his Dead Wrestlers' Society stable. TNA responded to Carnes later that week, stating that his claims would not hold up in court as, among other reasons, he had described the character to TNA's bookers as being like the Joker, so he could not claim copyright. In an interview with Justin LaBar, Carnes denied that TNA had contacted him.

== Championships and accomplishments ==
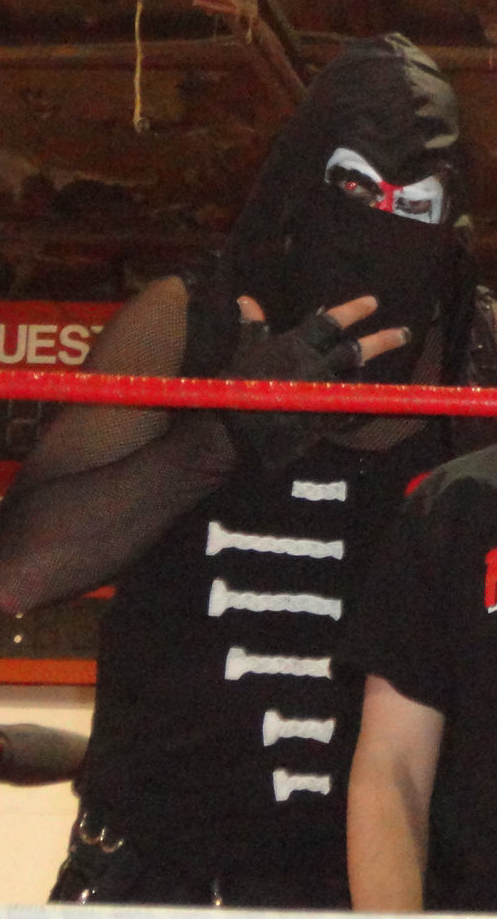
Kennedy, as Krimson, in 2012.

- All American Wrestling
  - AAW Tag Team Championship (1 time) – with Trik Davis
- Buffalo Championship Wrestling
  - BCW Heavyweight Championship (1 time)
- Cleveland All Pro Wrestling
  - CAPW Television Championship (1 time)
- Independent Wrestling Revolution
  - IWR Heavyweight Championship (1 time)
- Mid-West Wrestling
  - Mid-West Heavyweight Championship (1 time)
- Pro Wrestling Illustrated
  - PWI ranked him 269 of the top 500 wrestlers in the PWI 500 in 2012
- Pro Wrestling Ohio / Prime Wrestling
  - Prime Championship (1 time)
  - PWO/Prime Tag Team Championship (1 time) – with Kirst
- Pro Wrestling Rampage
  - PWR Heavyweight Championship (1 time)
  - PWR Tag Team Championship (2 time) – with War Child
  - PWR Rampage Rumble Winner (3 time) – 2016/2017/2018
