= First Class (professional wrestling) =

Professional wrestling tag team

Tag team
- Members: A. J. Francis; Rich Swann; KC Navarro
- Name: First Class
- Debut: March 14, 2024
- Disbanded: December 5, 2025
- Years active: 2024–2025

First Class, stylized as Fir$t Cla$$, was a villainous American professional wrestling tag team that performed in Total Nonstop Action Wrestling (TNA) consisting of leader A. J. Francis, KC Navarro, and Rich Swann.

== History ==
=== TNA Wrestling (2024–2025) ===
==== Formation ====
On January 13, 2024, Francis appeared at Hard To Kill under his real name, attacking Joe Hendry and marking his debut for Total Nonstop Action (TNA) Wrestling. On March 14 episode of TNA Impact!, he would defeat Hendry with the help of Rich Swann, with the latter turning heel and the duo dubbed themselves First Class (stylized as Fir$t Cla$$).

==== Championship pursuits (2024–2025) ====
On the June 6 episode of Impact! 20th Anniversary Show, Francis won the TNA Digital Media Championship from Laredo Kid, his first title win in TNA. On the June 15 taping of TNA Impact! (aired on tape delay on June 27), Francis (in kayfabe) bought the Canadian International Heavyweight Championship, a title that was promoted in Canada for many years and had been retired since 1987. As the new owner of the title, Francis declared himself as its new champion, making himself a double champion in the process. At Slammiversary on July 20, Francis lost the TNA Digital Media Championship and the International Heavyweight Wrestling Championship to PCO in a Montreal Street Fight, ending his reign as TNA Digital Media Champion at 62 days and his reign as Canadian International Heavyweight Champion at 35 days. On August 21, it was reported that TNA suspended Swann after his arrest for disorderly intoxication and entered into rehab. Navarro would officially align himself with Francis on August 30, 2024 at Emergence joining First Cla$$ and replacing Swann to challenge ABC (Ace Austin and Chris Bey) in a losing effort for the TNA World Tag Team Championship.

During the July 25, 2025 tapings of iMPACT!, Swann made his return and both Francis and Swann turned on Navarro, thus kicking him out of the group. Francis and Swann teamed together as a tag team in TNA for the first time since August 2, 2024 as they defeated The System (Eddie Edwards and Brian Myers) at Emergence on August 14, 2025 in Swann's hometown of Baltimore, Maryland.

==== Disbandment ====
At Final Resolution on December 5, 2025, Swann turned on Francis and aided Leon Slater in retaining the TNA X Division Championship, thus disbanding the tag team.

=== NXT (2025) ===
First Class made their NXT debut on the June 3, 2025 episode of NXT where Francis and Navarro would interfere in the match between Mike Santana and Trick Williams by attacking Santana, helping Williams to retain his TNA World Championship.

== Championships and accomplishments ==
- Total Nonstop Action Wrestling
  - TNA Digital Media Championship (1 time) – Francis
  - Canadian International Heavyweight Championship (1 time) – Francis
