= KC Navarro =

American professional wrestler (born 1999)

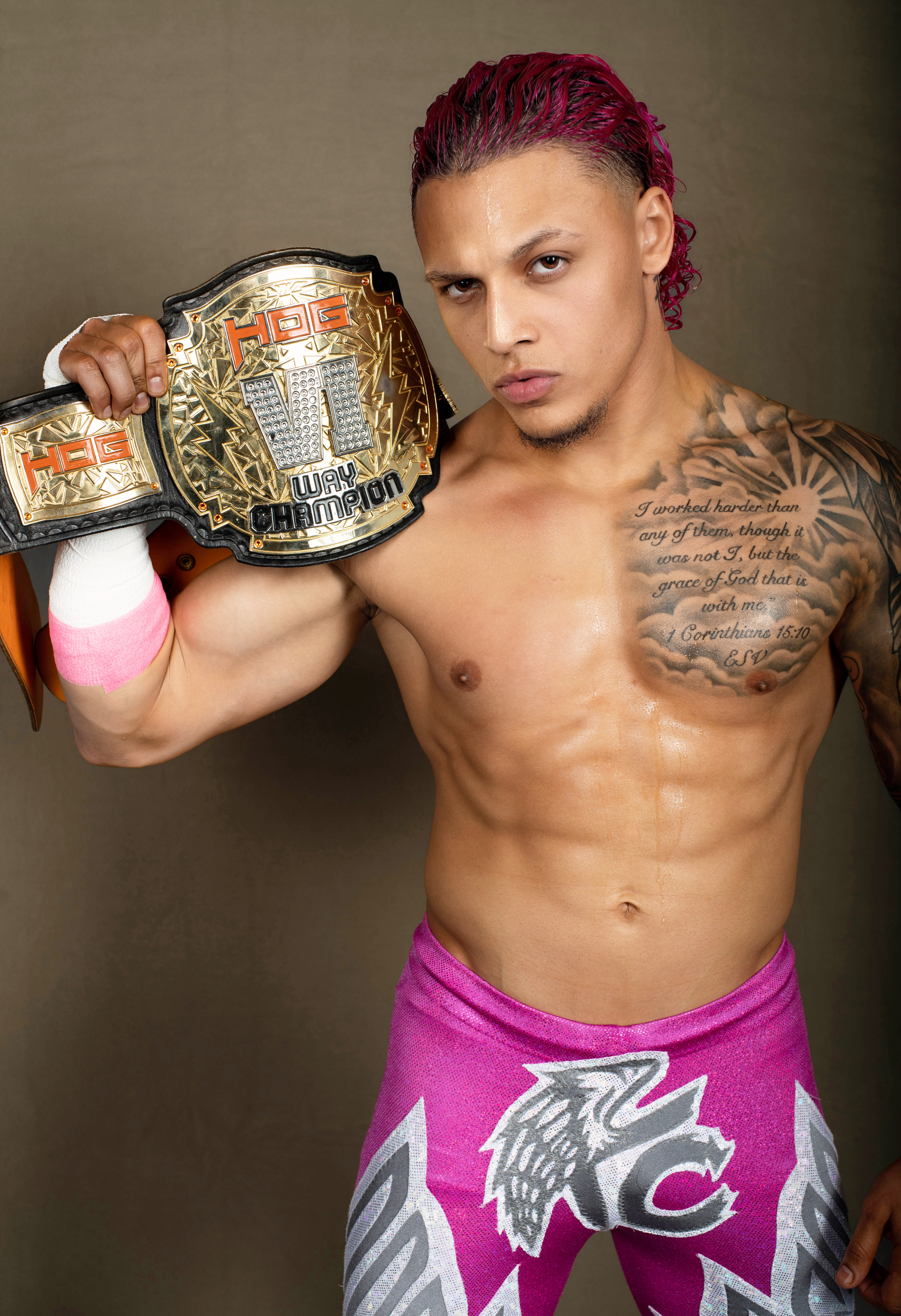
- Navarro in April 2024

Personal information
- Born: Christian Michael Navarro; July 21, 1999 (age 27) Metuchen, New Jersey U.S.
- Family: Diamante (sister)

Professional wrestling career
- Ring name(s): Kid Christian; KC Navarro
- Billed height: 5 ft 6 in (165 cm)
- Billed weight: 175 lb (61 kg)
- Billed from: Miami, Florida
- Trained by: Dan Maff; Anthony Bowens; Preacher Finneus James
- Debut: May 23, 2015

Christian Michael Navarro (born July 21, 1999), better known by his ring name KC Navarro, is an American professional wrestler. He is signed to Total Nonstop Action Wrestling (TNA), where he is a former member of First Class. He also performs on the independent circuit. Navarro has previously competed for Combat Zone Wrestling (CZW), Major League Wrestling (MLW) and briefly for All Elite Wrestling (AEW).

== Early life ==
KC Navarro was raised in Metuchen, New Jersey, and graduated from Metuchen High School in 2017. He began training in professional wrestling at the age of 15 at Pro Wrestling Syndicate in Rahway, New Jersey, under the guidance of Dan Maff, Anthony Bowens and Preacher Finneus James.

== Professional wrestling career ==
=== Independent circuit (2015–2018) ===
Navarro made his professional debut on May 23, 2015, under the ring name Kid Christian. He wrestled for various independent promotions, gaining recognition for his aerial maneuvers and charisma.

=== Combat Zone Wrestling (2016–2020) ===
In November 2016, Navarro joined Combat Zone Wrestling (CZW), where he became a fan favorite. He won a five-way match on December 14, 2019 defeating Leon Ruff, Matt Macintosh, Gabriel Skye and Kris Bishop, to become the number one contender for the CZW Wired Championship.

He would later defeat AR Fox at CZW's 21st anniversary show on 8 February 2020 to become the CZW Wired Champion.

=== Major League Wrestling (2021–2022) ===
Navarro signed with Major League Wrestling (MLW) in July 2021.

Navarro would make his debut for MLW on July 10, 2021 at Battle Riot III competing in the Battle Riot match before ultimately being eliminated by Mads Krügger.

He would make further appearances with MLW defeating both Ho Ho Lun and Warhorse.

He would later embark in a feud with nZo in which he would lose the first match at MLW SuperFight but he would gain his revenge winning the rematch in under two minutes on April 1, 2022.

Navarro would then compete for the MLW World Middleweight Championship on May 13, 2022 losing to reigning champion Myron Reed in a three way bout that also featured Arez.

Navarro would next compete at Battle Riot IV defeating Mini Abismo Negro. He would also later compete in the main event in Battle Riot Match where he would eventually be eliminated by Rickey Shane Page.

=== Impact Wrestling/Total Nonstop Action Wrestling (2021, 2024–present) ===
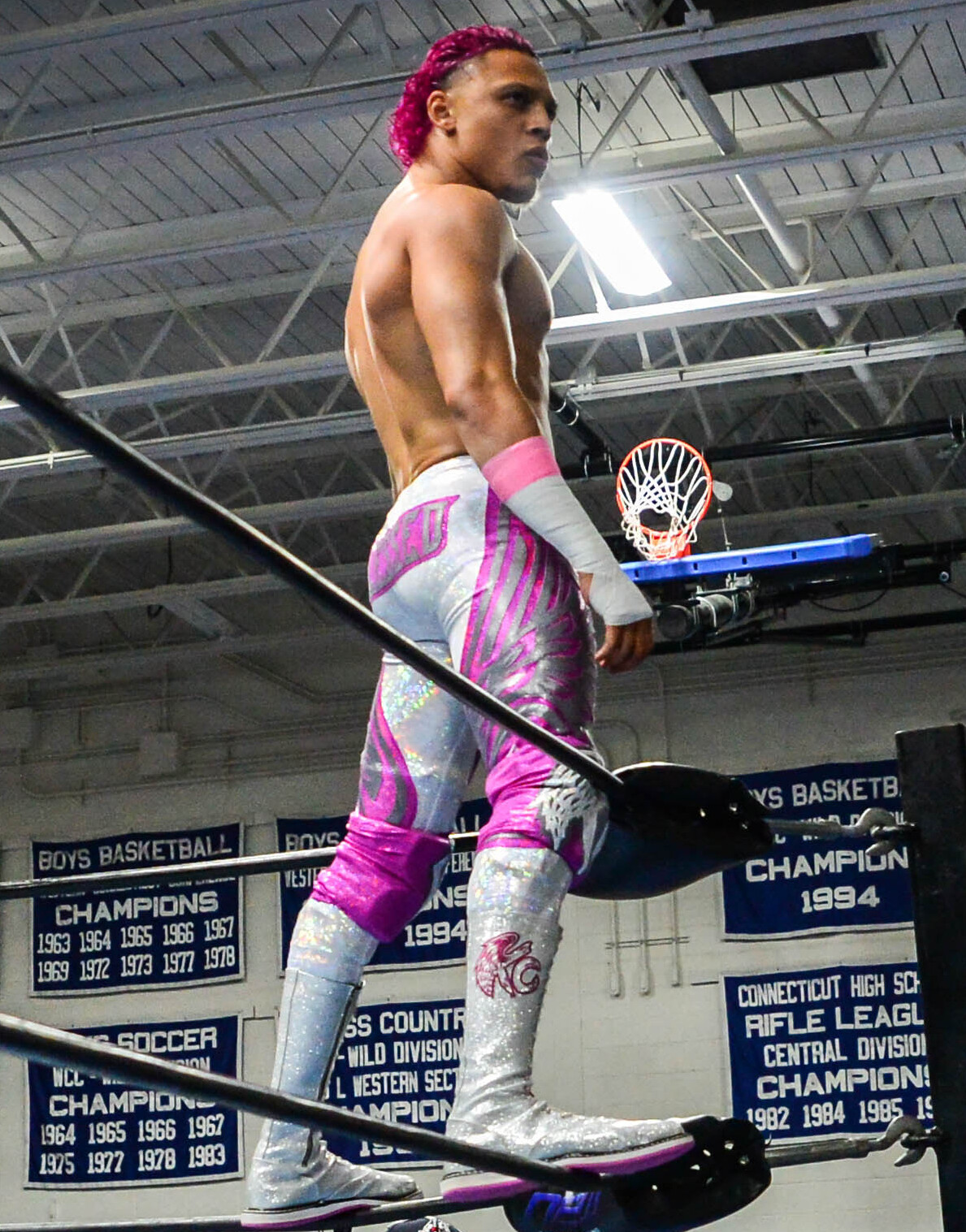
Navarro in April 2024

Navarro would first appear in the Super X Cup tournament in Genesis 2021 where he was eliminated in the first round by eventual runner up Blake Christian.

Navarro would officially align himself with AJ Francis on August 30, 2024 at Emergence joining First Cla$$ and replacing Rich Swann (who had been suspended due to disorderly intoxication) to challenge ABC (Ace Austin and Chris Bey) in a losing effort for the TNA World Tag Team Championship.

On the 13th September 2024, Navarro would once again team with Francis to face The Hardys (Matt and Jeff Hardy) at TNA Victory Road 2024.

Navarro would then compete in the Call Your Shot Gauntlet match at Bound For Glory 2024 being eliminated by Zachary Wentz.

On the Halloween episode of Impact, Navarro would team with Francis to defeat The Rascalz (Trey Miguel and Zachary Wentz).

During the July 25, 2025 tapings of iMPACT!, Navarro was kicked out of Fir$t Cla$$ after Swann made his return and both Francis and Swann turned on Navarro, thus kicking him out of the group.

Navarro returned from injury on April 11, 2026 at Rebellion as a face, costing A.J. Francis his match against Nic Nemeth.

=== WWE (2025) ===
Navarro would make his NXT debut on the June 3, 2025 episode of NXT where he and AJ Francis would interfere in the match between Mike Santana and Trick Williams by attacking Santana, helping Williams to retain his TNA World Championship.

== Personal life ==
Navarro is of Dominican and Italian descent. He has an older sister who is also a professional wrestler, currently performing in All Elite Wrestling (AEW) under the ring name Diamante.

== Championships and accomplishments ==
- Combat Zone Wrestling
  - CZW Wired Championship (1 time, final)
- Battlefield Pro Wrestling
  - BPW Heavyweight Championship (1 time)
- GTS Wrestling
  - GTS Intercontinental Championship (1 time)
- Superstars Of Wrestling Federation
  - SWF Cruiserweight Championship (2 time)
- Catalyst Wrestling/Capitol Wrestling
  - Sapphire TV Championship (1 time)
  - Capitol Wrestling Freestyle Championship (1 time, inaugural)
  - Capitol Wrestling Tag Team Championship (1 time) – with Lucky 13
- Warrior Wrestling
  - Warrior Wrestling Championship (1 time)
- Independent Superstars of Professional Wrestling
  - ISPW Tri State Championship (1 time)
- Northeast Wrestling
  - NEW Live Championship (1 time)
- Pro Wrestling Illustrated
  - Ranked No. 185 of the top 500 singles wrestlers in the PWI 500 in 2026
- Remarkable Wrestling
  - Remarkable Championship (1 time)
- Destiny Wrestling
  - Destiny New Era Championship (1 time)
- House Of Glory
  - HOG Cruiserweight Championship (2 time)
- Wrestling Has A Tomorrow
  - WHAT Championship (1 time)
- UWA Elite Wrestling
  - UWA Elite Tag Team Championship (1 time) – with Jordan Oliver
  - UWA Elite Tag Team Combat Cup Winner (2017) – with Jordan Oliver
