= Josh Bishop =

American professional wrestler (born 1997)

Personal information
- Born: Josh Bishop; 18 March 1997 (age 29) Akron, Ohio, U.S.

Professional wrestling career
- Ring name(s): Josh Bishop; Joshua Bishop; Skid McGraw
- Billed height: 6 ft 3 in (1.91 m)
- Billed weight: 240 lb (110 kg)
- Trained by: Candice LeRae (AIW Academy); Johnny Gargano (AIW Academy)
- Debut: 2017

Joshua Bishop (born March 18, 1997), is an American professional wrestler. He is currently working Major League Wrestling (MLW) where he is the current MLW World Heavyweight Champion and a former MLW World Tag Team Champion and the independent circuit, particularly with Juggalo Championship Wrestling (JCW) where he was the JCW Heavyweight Champion, Absolute Intense Wrestling (AIW) where he a three-time AIW Absolute Champion and AIW Instense Champion. He has also worked with Total Nonstop Action Wrestling (TNA), Game Changer Wrestling, Alpha-1 Wrestling, the National Wrestling Alliance (NWA), and Coastal Championship Wrestling (CCW).

== Professional wrestling career ==
=== Independent circuit (2017–present) ===
On May 27, 2017, Joshua Bishop made his debut at Absolute Intense Wrestling's (AIW) Back to the Future Cup at Our Lady of Mt. Carmel School in Cleveland, Ohio in which he competed in a six-way match against Chase Oliver, Big Twan Tucker, Kurt Hurtz, Parker Pierce, and Tre Lamar. On June 10, 2017, Bishop wrestled in his first singles match at AIW's Night of the Creeps against Jonathan Wolf. On August 6, 2017, Bishop began wrestling outside of Ohio as he make his Southern Underground Pro (SUP) debut at the promotion's Maximum Overdrive event in Nashville, Tennessee in a five-way match against AJ Gray, Chase Oliver, Derek Direction, and Dr. Daniel C. Rockingham. At AIW's Gauntlet for the Gold 14 event on April 26, 2019, Bishop won his first championship as he defeated Matthew Justice to win the AIW Intense Championship. In 2020, Bishop competed in the Masked Wrestler series produced by Beyond Wrestling as Skid McGraw but lost to Genkai in the fifth episode.

On February 4, 2024, Bishop won the A1 Outer Limits Championship in his Alpha-1 Wrestling debut in a six-way elimination match against champion Steve Brown, Derek Dillenger, Juntai Miller, Ethan Price, and Kubes during the Watch The Throne 7 event. On August 15, 2026, Bishop made his Wrestling Revolver debut in which he teamed up with the Algorithm (Brent Oakley, Crash, and Joe Alonzo) in a frat house rules match against Alpha Sig (Dick Meyers and KC Jacobs), BDE, and Madman Fulton during the Cage of Horrors 5 event.

=== Game Changer Wrestling (2019–present) ===
On June 1, 2019, Joshua Bishop made his Game Changer Wrestling (GCW) debut at the promotion's Tournament of Survival 4 pay-per-view in Atlantic City, New Jersey in which he fought against KTB, the Grim Reefer, Kikutaro, Matthew Justice, and Pinkie Sanchez in a six-way scramble match. On December 31, 2020, Bishop teamed up with Matthew Justice as the Crazy Tough Enemies against Ironbeast (KTB and Shane Mercer). On December 31, 2020, Bishop teamed up with Matthew Justice as the Crazy Tough Enemies against Ironbeast (KTB and Shane Mercer). On April 18, 2025, Bishop challenged Zilla Fatu for the 4th Rope Heavyweight Championship in a steel cage match at 4th Rope Wrestling and GCW's Heels Have Eyes VI: For The Culture pay-per-view.

=== Juggalo Championship Wrestling (2021–2022) ===
On April 10, 2021, Joshua Bishop made his Juggalo Championship Wrestling debut during the Fenced In Fury at the Folson Felony Funhouse event in Farmington Hills, Michigan in a singles match against Kaplan. During Bloodymania 14 on August 20, 2021, Bishop competed in a 20-man battle royal match which featured Shane Mercer, Shark Boy, and Corporal Robinson. At Bloodymania 15 on August 6, 2022, Bishop fought Vampiro and Delirious in a three-way electrified steel cage match. At Bloodymania 16 on August 6, 2023, Bishop won the JCW Heavyweight Championship after defeating Joey Janela, Matthew Justice, and Tom Lawlor in a five-way match for the vacant championship. On October 31, 2023, at the Hallowicked event in Detroit, Michigan, Bishop defended the title against Joey Janela. However, he was stripped of the championship at the end of the year.

=== Total Nonstop Action Wrestling (2025) ===
On July 18, 2025, TNA announced that Josh Bishop, Real1, and Zilla Fatu would be representing 4th Rope Wrestling in a six-man tag team match during the 2025 Total Nonstop Action Wrestling (TNA) Slammiversary pay-per-view on July 20, 2025. During the Countdown to Slammiversary, Team 4th Rope won a pre-show six-man tag team match against Steve Maclin, Mance Warner, and Jake Something. During this match, the commentators confirmed that TNA had formed a working relationship with 4th Rope.

On August 16, 2026, Fightful reported that after attending a WWE tryout in St. Paul, Minnesota, Bishop had been getting interest from TNA in being signed to a contract with the promotion.

=== Return to Major League Wrestling (2026–present) ===
On January 29, 2026, Bishop made his return to MLW during the promotion's Battle Riot VIII event in which he was eliminated by Killer Kross and Matt Riddle in the Battle Riot match. On the June 14, 2026 episode of Fusion, Bishop defeated Matthew Justice in a Street Fight. On the July 4, 2026 episode of Fusion, Josh Bishop had replaced Bishop Dyer as Donovan Dijak's partner in the Skyscrapers tag team following Dyer being stripped of the MLW World Tag Team Championship and locked out of MLW amid talks of a WWE return. In an interview with Sean Ross Sapp of Fightful, Donovan Dijak praised Josh Bishop for stepping in to replace Bishop Dyer as his tag team partner and holder of the MLW World Tag Team Championship. On November 7, 2026, at Saturday Night SuperFight, Bishop defeated Killer Kross in a Last Man Standing match to win the MLW World Heavyweight Championship.

=== Return to Juggalo Championship Wrestling (2026–present) ===
On May 24, 2026, Bishop made his return to JCW during the Gorilla Monsoon June tapings which aired on the June 11, 2026 episode of JCW Lunacy in which he was accompanied by Joel Gertner against EC3 in his debut match, claiming to be the "real" JCW World Heavyweight Champion. Bishop defended the disputed title in various matches beginning on July 24, 2026. On August 20, 2026, during the Gathering of the Juggalos, Bishop competed in a battle royal for the JCW Battle Royal Championship.

== Championships and accomplishments ==
- Absolute Intense Wrestling
  - AIW Absolute Championship (3 times)
  - AIW Intense Championship (3 times)
  - AIW Tag Team Championship (with Wes Barkley as the Rip City Shooters, 1 time)
- Alpha-1 Wrestling
  - A1 Outer Limits Championship (1 time)
- Appalachian Championship Wrestling
  - ACW Bluegrass Con Championship (1 time, current)
  - ACW Heavyweight Championship (2 times)
  - ACW Super H Championship (1 time)
  - ACW Tag Team Championship (1 time, current) – with Gen Z
  - ACW Undisputed Heavyweight Championship (1 time)
- Black Label Pro
  - BLP Midwest Championship (1 time)
- Capital City Championship Combat
  - C4 Underground Championship (1 time)
- Juggalo Championship Wrestling
  - JCW World Heavyweight Championship/JCW "Linear" Heavyweight Championship (1 time, current)
- Major League Wrestling
  - MLW World Heavyweight Championship (1 time, current)
  - MLW World Tag Team Championship (1 time) – with Bishop Dyer and Donovan Dijak
- MEGA Championship Wrestling
  - MEGA Championship (1 time)
- Ultimate Xtreme Wrestling Alliance
  - UXWA Tag Team Championship (with Wes Barkley as the Rip City Shooters, 1 time)
