= 4th Rope Wrestling =

American independent professional wrestling promotion

- Founded: 2024
- Style: Professional wrestling
- Headquarters: Buffalo, New York
- Founder: Alvin Lamar Worthy
- Owner: Alvin Lamar Worthy
- Website: 4thrope.com

4th Rope Wrestling is an American professional wrestling promotion owned by Alvin Lamar Worthy, a rapper, fashion designer, and owner of Griselda Records better known by his stage name Westside Gunn.

== History ==
In October 2024, rapper Westside Gunn announced the launch of a professional wrestling promotion he referred to as 4th Rope Wrestling with the first event scheduled for November 2, 2024 at the UIC Dorin Forum in Chicago, Illinois. The main event for the promotion's first event titled Heels Have Eyes III: Steel Praying was headlined by John Wayne Murdoch fighting against Joe Alonzo in a steel cage match. The event also featured Violence is Forever (Dominic Garrini and Kevin Ku) defending the GCW Tag Team Championship against The New Guys (Jake Bosche and Scott Stanley) and Zilla Fatu taking on Moose to crown the inaugural 4th Rope Heavyweight Champion and was aired on tape delay on January 4, 2025 on YouTube. The next 4th Rope event titled Heels Have Eyes IV: Atlanta took place on December 12, 2024 at the Center Stage Theater in Atlanta, Georgia and featured a three-way ladder match to crown the inaugural 4th Rope Tag Team Champions in which The Hardys (Matt Hardy and Jeff Hardy) won the titles against The Infantry (Carlie Bravo and Shawn Dean) and Violence is Forever (Dominic Garrini and Kevin Ku).

On April 18, 2025 4th Rope teamed up with Game Changer Wrestling (GCW) to present the 2025 For The Culture pay-per-view which was streamed live on Triller TV during the Collective at the Palms Casino Resort in Las Vegas, Nevada and featured a battle royal to crown the inaugural 4th Rope Flyweight Champion in which Real1 won the match and became the inaugural Flyweight Champion. On July 10, 2025, 4th Rope wrestler Real1 was featured in a vignette on the July 10, 2025 episode of TNA Impact. On July 18, 2025, TNA announced that Real1, Josh Bishop, and Zilla Fatu would be representing 4th Rope in a six-man tag team match during the 2025 Total Nonstop Action Wrestling (TNA) Slammiversary pay-per-view on July 20, 2025. During the Countdown to Slammiversary, Team 4th Rope won a pre-show six-man tag team match against Steve Maclin, Mance Warner, and Jake Something. During this match, the commentators confirmed that TNA had formed a working relationship with 4th Rope.

== Championships ==
=== Current ===
Championship	Current Champion(s)	Date won	Days held	Event	Location	Notes
4th Rope Heavyweight Championship	Bobby Lashley	November 12, 2026	1+	Heelmatic	New York City, New York	Defeated Joe Alonzo, who had been awarded the vacant title earlier that night.
4th Rope Tag Team Championship	The Infantry (Capt. Shawn Deen and Carlie Bravo)	November 12, 2026	1+	Heelmatic	New York City, New York	Defeated The Hardys(c) (Matt Hardy and Jeff Hardy) and 5150 (Danny Limelight and Slice Boogie) in a triple threat match.
4th Rope Flyweight Championship	Real1	April 18, 2025	574+	4th Rope/GCW Heels Have Eyes VI: For The Culture 2025	Las Vegas, Nevada	Won in a battle royal.
4th Rope Women's Championship	Rhio	August 25, 2025	445+	Heels Have Eyes: Westside Gunn Day 2025	Buffalo, New York	
