= Andrea Williams (sports executive) =

Utah Jazz
- Position: Chief Experience Officer
- League: NBA

Career information
- High school: San Antonio, Texas
- College: Texas A&M

Career history
- 1998–2003: Big Ten (Director)
- 2003–2004: Big Ten (Assistant Commissioner)
- 2004–2006: NCAA (Director)
- 2006–2016: Big Ten (Associate Commissioner)
- 2016–2018: Big Sky (Commissioner)
- 2018–2021: College Football Playoff (COO)
- 2021–2024: Utah Jazz (CXO)
- 2024–: UIC Flames (AD)

Andrea Williams is an American sports executive who is the athletic director at the University of Illinois Chicago. She was the chief experience officer for the Utah Jazz from 2021 to 2024 and the chief operating officer for the College Football Playoff from 2018 to 2021. Previously, she was the commissioner of the Big Sky Conference from 2016 to 2018, and an associate commissioner for the Big Ten Conference from 2006 to 2016.

== Personal life ==
Williams' father was in the military, and retired in San Antonio Texas, where Williams attended high school. At Texas A&M University she played volleyball from 1992 to 1995 and joined the basketball program for the 1993–94 seasons. Williams earned a starting spot as a senior on the volleyball team, and tallied 343 kills, hitting at a .301 clip, while also adding 281 digs. She earned a master's degree in sport administration from Ohio University.

== Career ==
After graduating, she worked for the Southern Conference and then spent six years with the Big Ten Conference working on marketing. After time working for the NCAA she returned to the Big Ten as Associate commissioner. In 2011 she was President of Collegiate Event and Facility Management Association.

In 2016 she was hired by the Big Sky Conference as commissioner, where she implemented a policy for athletes: "Bottom line was, we were not going to provide scholarships or athletic participation to those individuals who fell under the serious misconduct policy." While with the Big Sky, there was discussion of her as a candidate for Pac-12 commissioner. In 2018 she was hired by the College Football Playoff as their chief operating officer, then in 2021 by the Utah Jazz as their chief experience officer.
