= UIC Flames =

Athletic teams of the University of Illinois Chicago

- University: University of Illinois Chicago
- Nickname: Flames
- NCAA: Division I
- Conference: MVC (primary); MAC (men's swimming & diving & men's tennis)
- Athletic director: Andrea Williams
- Location: Chicago, Illinois
- Varsity teams: 18 (8 men’s and 10 women’s)
- Basketball arena: Credit Union 1 Arena
- Baseball stadium: Curtis Granderson Stadium
- Softball stadium: Flames Field
- Soccer stadium: Flames Field
- Other venues: Cog Hill Golf and Country Club; Flames Athletic Center; Flames Natatorium; Flames Outdoor Tennis Courts; UIC Dorin Forum
- Colors: Navy blue and fire engine red
- Mascot: Sparky
- Fight song: "Fire Up Flames"
- Website: uicflames.com/index.aspx

The UIC Flames are the intercollegiate athletic teams that represent the University of Illinois Chicago, located in Chicago, Illinois, in intercollegiate sports as a member of the Division I level of the National Collegiate Athletic Association (NCAA), primarily competing in the Missouri Valley Conference (MVC) since the 2022–23 academic year.

The Flames previously competed in the D-I Horizon League from 1994–95 to 2021–22; in the D-I Mid-Continent Conference (Mid-Con, now currently known as the Summit League since 2007–08) from 1982–83 to 1993–94; as an NCAA D-I Independent during the 1981–82 school year; and in the Chicagoland Collegiate Athletic Conference (CCAC) of the National Association of Intercollegiate Athletics (NAIA) from 1949–50 to about 1980–81.

== Branding ==
UIC Athletics is known as the Flames in reference to the Great Chicago Fire. The school's primary colors are fire engine red and Navy Pier blue, as Navy Pier was the original location of UIC's campus. The Flames regularly incorporate the light blue and red stars of the flag of Chicago and the iconic Chicago skyline into their uniforms and branding.

== History ==
UIC athletics began with the College of Physicians and Surgeons (P&S) in the 1880s with their basketball and football teams whose team colors were red (blood) and iodoform (iodine). P&S eventually affiliated with and then became absorbed into the University of Illinois forming its College of Medicine.

In 1946, the Chicago Illini represented the two-year University of Illinois undergraduate division located on Navy Pier. In 1965 the Chicago Illini moved to Harrison and Halsted to represent the University of Illinois at Chicago Circle campus. Upon this move the team became known as the Chicas, a shortening of Chicago; this was changed to "Chikas" due to taunting from other teams knocking them ("chicas" means "girls" in Spanish). This spelling was rationalized as being a reference to the Chickasaw tribe. It was dropped in the seventies.

When the university joined the NCAA Division I in 1981, it had no nickname for its athletic teams and just used the phrase "Chicago Circle". The following year, the University of Illinois at Chicago Circle merged with the University of Illinois Medical Center and became known as the University of Illinois at Chicago, dropping "Circle" and later the preposition "at" from its name. The consolidated university adopted Flames as its athletic nickname by student votes at the two predecessor schools.

UIC was a charter member of the Association of Mid-Continent Universities which was established on June 18, 1982 and changed its name to the Mid-Continent Conference seven years later in 1989. It was one of six universities along with Cleveland State, Northern Illinois, Wisconsin–Green Bay, Wisconsin–Milwaukee and Wright State that left the Mid-Continent in 1994 to join the Midwestern Collegiate Conference which rebranded as the Horizon League on June 4, 2001.

UIC announced on January 26, 2022, that it would join the Missouri Valley Conference (MVC) as its 12th member institution effective July 1 that same year. The Horizon League initially banned UIC student-athletes from its conference tournaments for the remainder of the year, but reversed its decision eleven days later. The MVC does not sponsor men's swimming and diving or men's tennis, however, so the Flames also became affiliate members of the Mid-American Conference in men's swimming and diving as well as the Southland Conference in men's tennis, before moving that sport to the MAC the very next year as well.

== Varsity teams ==
Men's sports	Women's sports
Baseball	Basketball
Basketball	Cross country
Cross country	Golf
Soccer	Soccer
Swimming and diving	Softball
Tennis	Swimming and diving
Track and field^{†}	Tennis
	Track and field^{†}
	Volleyball
† – Track and field includes both indoor and outdoor

UIC competes in 18 intercollegiate varsity sports: men's sports include baseball, basketball, cross country, soccer, swimming & diving, tennis and track & field (indoor and outdoor); women's sports include basketball, cross country, golf, soccer, softball, swimming & diving, tennis, track & field (indoor and outdoor) and volleyball.

=== Men's basketball ===
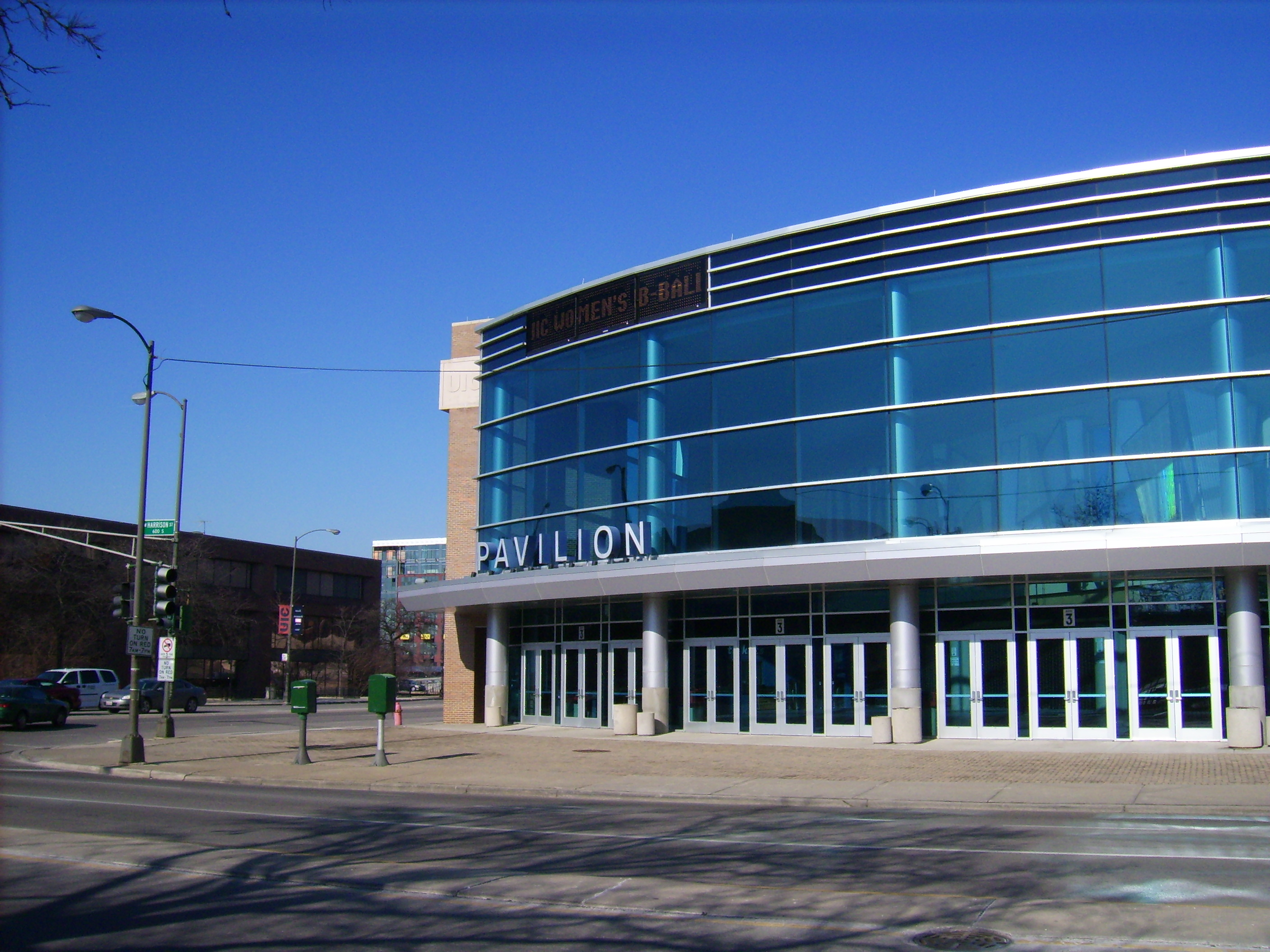
Credit Union 1 Arena, home of the UIC Flames

The 8,000-seat Credit Union 1 Arena is the home of the Flames' men's and women's basketball teams. The men's basketball team has earned six postseason appearances: three NCAA Tournaments (1998, 2002, 2004), one NIT (2003), one CBI (2017), and one CIT (2018). Jimmy Collins was head coach from 1996-2010 and led the Flames to four postseason appearances (three NCAAs and one NIT) and a 218-208 overall record. Howard Moore, a former assistant coach at Wisconsin, became head coach in 2010 and upset #12/14 Illinois at the United Center in his first season. Moore was let go after five seasons in which the Flames went 49–111 overall. He was replaced by Indiana assistant and former Wyoming head coach Steve McClain who compiled a 79-93 record in five seasons. Former Texas and Michigan assistant Luke Yaklich succeeded McClain and went 47-70 in four seasons. Rob Ehsan, former head coach at UAB and assistant coach at Stanford, Virginia Tech, and Maryland, was introduced as UIC head coach on April 1, 2024.

=== Women's basketball ===
UIC women's basketball has made four postseason appearances, including the 2007 WNIT, the 2014 (champions) and 2023 WBI tournaments, and the 2024 WNIT. Missouri Tigers assistant and Oak Park, IL native Ashleen Bracey was hired as head coach in March 2022. In her first season, she led the Flames to the greatest win improvement in the history of the Missouri Valley Conference and the second highest win total in program history. In year two, Bracey's squad went 18-15 and became the first in program history to earn back-to-back postseason appearances after earning a berth in the WNIT. Joanne McCarthy (basketball), sister of actress/model Jenny McCarthy, is UIC's all-time scoring leader with 1,805 points.

=== Men's soccer ===
UIC's men's soccer team is an 8-time NCAA participant and 11-time conference champion. The 2006 squad was ranked as high as #6 in the NCAA national polls and made it to the second round of the 2006 NCAA Tournament. The Flames reached the "Elite Eight" in the 2007 NCAA Tournament.

UIC opened the new $5M Flames Field in fall 2020. The only collegiate grass pitch in Chicago, it features a grass pitch with state-of-the-art irrigation and drainage systems, a new video board, grass berm seating behind each goal, and a grandstand with capacity for 1,200 offering fans panoramic views of the iconic Chicago skyline.

Jay DeMerit played for UIC's men's soccer and captained the Vancouver Whitecaps FC in Major League Soccer, and was a former captain of Watford whom he played for in the Premier League and the Championship. Jay also is a former member of the US national team, whom he represented in the 2010 FIFA World Cup. Another Flame, Pat McMahon received an offer to play in Scotland in 2009. Baggio Husidić is a former MLS player who played with Chicago Fire and Los Angeles Galaxy.

=== Baseball ===
UIC Baseball has made six NCAA Regional Appearances and won 12 regular season conference championships. Former Major League player Curtis Granderson was an All-American for the Flames. A three-time MLB All Star, four-time MLBPA Marvin Miller Man of the Year recipient (2009, 2016, 2018, 2019), and Roberto Clemente Award winner (2016), Granderson's $5 million gift to help build UIC's Granderson Baseball Stadium is among the largest known one-time donations by a professional athlete to his or her alma mater, according to Sports Illustrated.

=== Softball ===
UIC Softball has made 12 NCAA Regional Appearances and won 11 conference championships. The Flames' 1994 team reached the Women's College World Series.

=== Volleyball ===
UIC Volleyball has made 5 postseason appearances, including the 2021 NCAA Tournament and the AIAW Championship (1972, 1973, 1974, 1975). The Flames have won 3 conference championships, including the 2021 Horizon League Tournament.

=== Women's tennis ===
The Flames women's tennis program has been dominant for the past two decades, winning 19 conference championships and making 17 NCAA Tournament appearances.

=== Swimming and diving ===
UIC men's and women's swimming and diving have won more than 80 individual conference titles. The men's swim team won the Horizon League Championships in 2009. Swimming & Diving 2007 alumni Blake Booher qualified for the 2008 Olympic Swimming Trials in the 50 Freestyle. 2011 alumni Steve Yemm qualified for the 2012 Olympic Swimming Trials in the 100 & 200 Butterfly.

=== Discontinued sports ===
UIC previously sponsored a football team known as the Chicago Circle Chikas that played at Soldier Field from 1965-1973, a men's ice hockey from 1966-1996, and men's and women's gymnastics teams until 2018-19. The Flames also previously fielded teams in wrestling, men's water polo, and men's golf.

== Spirit squads ==
The Flames feature both UIC Cheer and UIC Dance, as well as the UIC Pep Band. Sparky is the Flames mascot. His number '0' jersey pays homage to UIC's roots as the Chicago Circle campus.
