= Bobby Lashley =

American wrestler & mixed martial artist (born 1976)

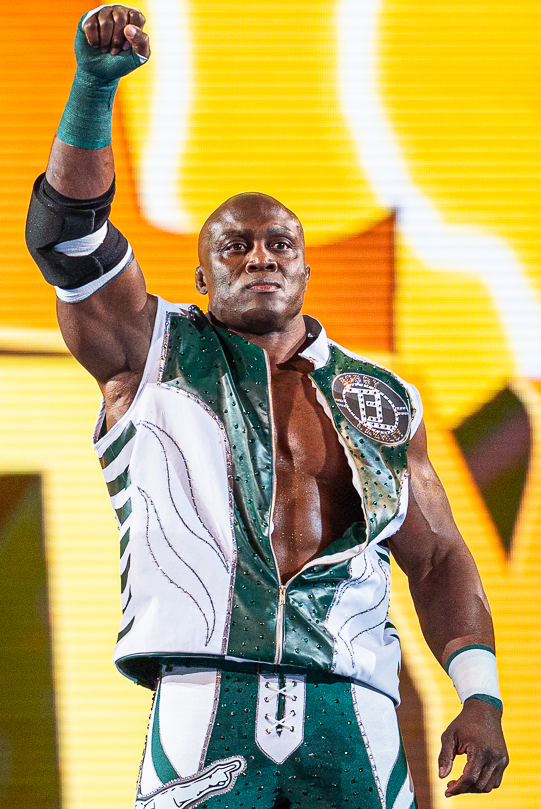
- Lashley in 2024

Personal information
- Born: Franklin Roberto Lashley; July 16, 1976 (age 50) Junction City, Kansas, U.S.
- Education: Missouri Valley College (BA)
- Life partner: Kristal Marshall (2007–2010)
- Children: 3

Professional wrestling career
- Ring name(s): Blaster Lashley; Bobby Lashley; Lashley
- Billed height: 6 ft 3 in (191 cm)
- Billed weight: 273 lb (124 kg)
- Billed from: Colorado Springs, Colorado
- Trained by: Ohio Valley Wrestling
- Debut: January 5, 2005
- Military service
- Allegiance: United States
- Branch: United States Army
- Service years: 1999–2002
- Rank: Sergeant

Franklin Roberto "Bobby" Lashley (born July 16, 1976) is an American professional wrestler and former mixed martial artist. He is signed to All Elite Wrestling (AEW), where he is a member of The Hurt Syndicate stable. He is a former one-time AEW World Tag Team Champion with stablemate Shelton Benjamin. He is best known for his tenures in WWE, while also being known for his tenure in Total Nonstop Action Wrestling (TNA). As a mixed martial artist, Lashley competed for Bellator MMA and Strikeforce.

Lashley debuted in WWE in 2005, appearing on the SmackDown brand where he became a one-time United States Champion. After being drafted to the ECW brand the following year, Lashley became a two-time ECW World Champion. During this time, he had a high-profile rivalry with company chairman Vince McMahon, which included representing Donald Trump in the "Battle of the Billionaires" at WrestleMania 23, before leaving the company in 2008.

He subsequently pursued a career in mixed martial arts (MMA) and had his first professional fight in December 2008. After amassing a career record of 10–2, he signed with Bellator MMA in 2014 where he won all five of his career bouts from 2014 to 2016.

In 2009, Lashley began appearing in professional wrestling promotion TNA before leaving the company the next year. In 2014, he returned to TNA (later renamed to Impact in 2017), where he became a four-time TNA World Heavyweight Champion. He was also a one-time X Division Champion and the final King of the Mountain Champion. After leaving Impact in early 2018, he returned to WWE that April, becoming a two-time WWE Champion, two-time Intercontinental Champion, and winning the United States Championship on two further occasions. He left WWE in August 2024 upon the expiration of his contract. He then signed with AEW, making his debut in October at Fright Night Dynamite.

He has headlined multiple pay-per-view (PPV) events for WWE and TNA, including the 2016 edition of the latter's flagship event, Bound for Glory.

== Early life ==
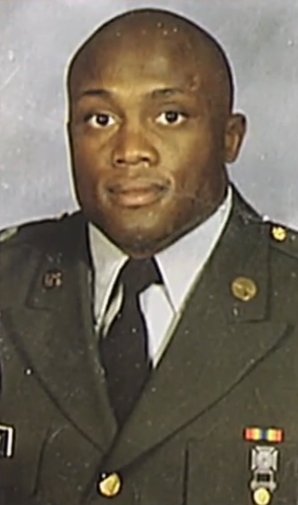
Lashley during his time in the United States Army.

Franklin Roberto Lashley was born on July 16, 1976, in Junction City, Kansas, the son of a U.S. Army drill sergeant. Lashley is of Panamanian descent through his mother, and is of Afro-Caribbean descent through his father, who also was born and raised in Panama and immigrated to the USA before Bobby Lashley was born. Bobby grew up in a single parent household with a mother who barely spoke English and struggled to secure a good job, while his father was in the military. He has three older sisters, one of whom is still on active service in the U.S. Air Force as of 2015. The family occasionally moved from one military base to another. While his father was stationed at Fort Riley in Kansas, Lashley attended Fort Riley Middle School, where he was introduced to amateur wrestling in seventh grade as an off-season alternative to football. He later graduated from Junction City High School, where he continued to wrestle.

He attended Missouri Valley College, where he was the National Association of Intercollegiate Athletics (NAIA) National Wrestling Champion in the 177 lbs category in 1996, 1997, and 1998, and graduated in 1999 with a bachelor's degree in human-service agency management and recreation administration.

He followed his father into the United States Army after college, and continued to compete in amateur wrestling in the Army's World Class Athlete Program. During his three years in the Army, he won a gold and silver medal in the International Military Sports Council senior freestyle wrestling event. In 2003, while living and training in Colorado Springs with the goal of qualifying for Team USA to wrestle at the 2004 Olympic Games, Lashley witnessed a bank robbery and was forced to dive for cover to avoid gunfire; this resulted in a knee injury that required surgery, ending his amateur career.

== Professional wrestling career ==
=== World Wrestling Entertainment (2005–2008) ===
==== Undefeated streak (2005–2006) ====
In January 2005, Lashley made his debut for Ohio Valley Wrestling a WWE developmental territory working as Blaster Lashley. In mid-2005, Lashley appeared at four live events for World Wrestling Entertainment (WWE), wrestling in dark matches for both Raw and SmackDown!. On September 23, 2005, he made his televised debut as a face on SmackDown! under his real name, and was introduced as a three-time National Amateur Wrestling Champion, four-time All-American, two-time Armed Forces Champion, and a 2002 Silver Medalist at the Military World Championship. In his first match, he defeated Simon Dean, whom he also defeated in his pay-per-view debut at No Mercy on October 9. On the November 11 episode of SmackDown!, Lashley defeated Orlando Jordan in a qualifying match for a place on Team SmackDown! at Survivor Series on November 27, where he was the first to be eliminated by Shawn Michaels, but his team eventually won the match.

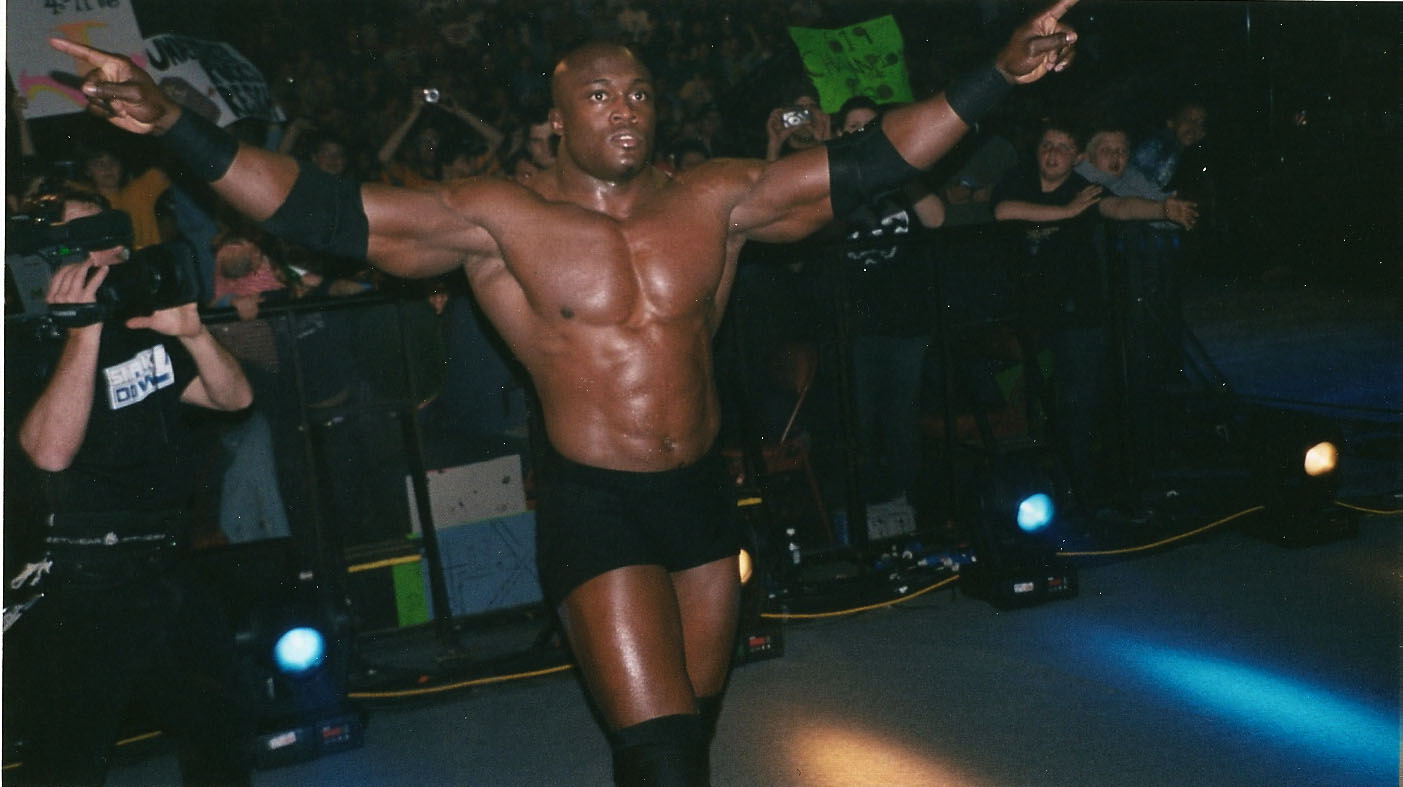
Lashley in 2006.

On January 6, 2006, Lashley became the first SmackDown! wrestler to qualify for that year's Royal Rumble. At the Royal Rumble on January 29, Lashley was the eighth wrestler to enter the match, in which he eliminated Sylvan, but was eliminated by the combination of Raw's then World Tag Team Champions Big Show and Kane. Following the Royal Rumble, Lashley began a feud with John "Bradshaw" Layfield (JBL), leading up to a match at No Way Out on February 19, where Lashley suffered his first loss in singles competition, largely due to interference from Finlay. This prompted a feud between Lashley and Finlay, which lasted throughout February and March, and it notably included a lumberjack match on the March 17 episode of SmackDown!, which Finlay won after using a shillelagh.

After winning a "Last Chance" battle royal on the March 24 episode of SmackDown! by lastly eliminating MNM, Lashley competed at WrestleMania 22 on April 2 in the Money in the Bank ladder match, which was won by Rob Van Dam. Lashley next entered SmackDown!'s 2006 King of the Ring tournament, making it to the finals as he defeated Mark Henry and Finlay. However, in the final round – held at Judgment Day on May 21 – he was defeated by Booker T with help from Finlay. As Booker T was being crowned during his coronation, Lashley speared Booker T into the throne. These acts developed into a feud with the newly named "King Booker" and the other members of his court (Queen Sharmell, Finlay, and William Regal). During this feud, Lashley won his first professional wrestling championship by defeating JBL for the United States Championship on the May 26 episode of SmackDown!, which he lost to Finlay a little less than two months later on the July 14 episode of SmackDown!. Shortly after losing the title, a physician declared Lashley unable to compete, stating that during an annual exam, Lashley was found to have elevated enzymes of the liver and therefore, would not be cleared to wrestle until further evaluation. Lashley returned a couple of weeks later to the SmackDown! roster to continue his feud with the Court and went on to earn his first match for the World Heavyweight Championship at No Mercy on October 8 against King Booker. The bout was subsequently turned into a four-way bout, also including Batista and King Booker's ally, Finlay. King Booker won the match after pinning Finlay.

==== ECW World Champion and feud with Mr. McMahon (2006–2007) ====
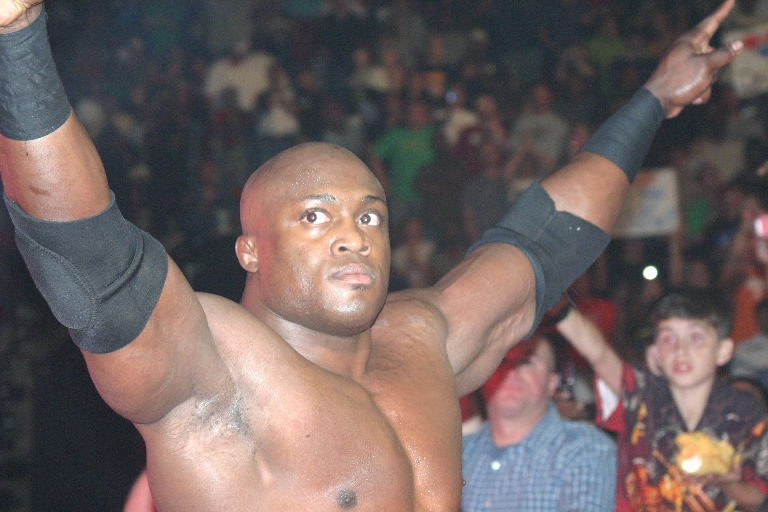
Lashley at a WWE house show in May 2007.

On the November 14 episode of ECW, Lashley moved to the ECW brand. He debuted on the brand by making a surprise appearance to sign a contract for the final spot in the Extreme Elimination Chamber match for the ECW World Championship at December to Dismember on December 3. At December to Dismember, Lashley was the fifth person released into the match, eliminating both Test and Big Show by pinfall after a spear to become the new ECW World Champion. After winning the ECW World Championship, Lashley then had successful title defenses against the likes of Big Show, Rob Van Dam, Test, Hardcore Holly, Kenny Dykstra, and Mr. Kennedy. On the March 19, 2007, episode of Raw, Lashley officially became the first and only person to ever break Chris Masters' Masterlock hold (Swinging full nelson) and thus the first and only person to ever defeat the Masterlock Challenge.

In early 2007, Lashley was selected by Donald Trump to represent him in a "Battle of the Billionaires" match, against Vince McMahon's representative, Umaga, which also featured Vince's long time adversary Stone Cold Steve Austin as the guest referee. At WrestleMania 23 on April 1 in a Hair vs. Hair match, Lashley defeated Umaga and helped Trump and Austin shave McMahon's head afterwards in accordance with the match's losing stipulation, saving Donald Trump's hair from being shaved off. Lashley then feuded with Mr. McMahon, who booked himself, his son Shane McMahon, and Umaga in a 3-on-1 handicap match against Lashley at Backlash on April 29 for the ECW World Championship. After two high impact diving splashes from Umaga, Mr. McMahon tagged himself into the match and pinned Lashley to win the title. Lashley legitimately injured his shoulder during the match and after an examination days later, it was revealed he had a damaged rotator cuff but would not need surgery at the time. At Judgment Day on May 20, Lashley defeated Vince, Shane, and Umaga in a 3-on-1 handicap rematch, but did not win the title as he pinned Shane instead of Vince; as a result, Mr. McMahon retained the title. On June 3 at One Night Stand, Lashley defeated Vince McMahon in a street fight to win the ECW World Championship for a second reign despite interference by Shane McMahon and Umaga in the match, making Lashley the first man to win the ECW World Championship twice since WWE reactivated the title.

==== Championship pursuits (2007–2008) ====
On the June 11 episode of Raw, Lashley was drafted to the Raw brand as part of the 2007 WWE draft. As a result of the move, Lashley was stripped of the ECW World Championship by Vince McMahon. He took place in a challenge match against Mick Foley, Randy Orton, King Booker and John Cena for the WWE Championship at Vengeance: Night of Champions on June 24, which Cena won to retain the title. Lashley became the number one contender for the WWE Championship by winning the "Beat the Clock" challenge on the July 2 episode of Raw. On July 22 at The Great American Bash, he lost to Cena and after the match, they shook hands as a sign of respect.

On the July 30 episode of Raw, Lashley was defeated by Mr. Kennedy. During the match, Lashley was "injured" after Mr. Kennedy kicked Lashley's shoulder into the ring steps, allowing Lashley to have time off for surgery for the legitimate injury he suffered at The Great American Bash. After a six-month hiatus, WWE announced that Lashley was released from his WWE contract on February 4, 2008.

=== Japan, Mexico, Puerto Rico and independent circuit (2008–2009) ===
After leaving WWE, Lashley began wrestling on the independent circuit in May 2008. In June 2008, he appeared in Mexico at Lucha Libre AAA World Wide's flagship event, Triplemanía XVI, where he, Kenzo Suzuki, and Electroshock defeated Chessman, Silver King, and La Parka, Jr.. In July 2008, Lashley wrestled in Puerto Rico at the World Wrestling Council's 35th anniversary show, defeating Rhino. In August 2008, Lashley appeared in Japan for Antonio Inoki's Inoki Genome Federation, defeating The Predator.

=== Total Nonstop Action Wrestling (2009–2010) ===
Lashley made an appearance at Total Nonstop Action Wrestling's Lockdown pay-per-view event on April 19, 2009, and he also later appeared on that week's episode of TNA Impact!, both times pointing and smiling at The Main Event Mafia, thus appearing as a heel. On July 15, TNA announced that he had signed an official contract with the company. On July 23, Kurt Angle introduced Lashley as the newest member of the Main Event Mafia. Lashley entered the ring and hugged Angle while the rest of the Mafia held a beaten and battered Mick Foley upright. Angle then told Lashley to finish off Foley but as Lashley prepared to spear Foley, he turned on Angle and cleared the Mafia from the ring, thus making him a face.

On the July 30 edition of Impact!, Lashley made his in-ring debut for TNA in a tag team match as he and Mick Foley wrestled against World Heavyweight Champion Kurt Angle and Legends Champion Kevin Nash, where if Angle or Nash was pinned, whoever defeated them would win their respective title. It started out as a handicap match due to the Main Event Mafia attacking Lashley before the match, but Lashley entered the match and helped Mick Foley pin Nash to win the match for his team and become the Legends Champion. On the edition of August 27 of Impact!, Jeremy Borash interviewed him and TNA President Dixie Carter in which she said their goal was to make him a World Champion in both MMA and TNA. At No Surrender on September 20, he beat Rhino with a knockout punch.

After No Surrender, Lashley began a feud with Samoa Joe. After teaming with Team 3D in a winning effort against Rhino and The British Invasion (Doug Williams and Brutus Magnus) on the edition of October 1 of Impact!, Joe assaulted Lashley and choked him out with a rear naked choke. The following week, Lashley cost Joe the X Division Championship in a match against Amazing Red. At Bound for Glory on October 18, Lashley defeated Joe in a submission match. At Turning Point on November 15, Lashley's winning streak came to an end when Scott Steiner pinned him in a Falls Count Anywhere match following a shot with a steel pipe. On November 26, Lashley defeated Abyss, Desmond Wolfe, and Robert Roode to win the TNA Championship Series tournament and earn himself a future World Heavyweight Title shot. At Final Resolution on December 20, Lashley avenged his prior loss and defeated Steiner in a Last Man Standing match with a pipeshot.

On January 4, 2010, the Monday night edition of Impact!, Lashley and Kristal turned heel after requesting their immediate releases from TNA in order for Lashley to fully concentrate on his MMA career. Lashley went on to attack random wrestlers until he was granted what he wanted. On the January 21 episode of Impact!, Lashley suddenly apologized to new executive producer Eric Bischoff for his actions, saying he just wanted to compete, but was nevertheless fired by him the following week. This was Lashley's last TNA appearance until 2014. On February 10, Lashley's profile was removed from the official TNA website. In an interview with Heavy Sports, Lashley claimed that the release was legitimate and had been done in order for him to fully focus on his MMA career.

=== Return to Japan and independent circuit (2010–2014) ===
Lashley returned to Japan on September 25, 2010, for a tag-team match with Bob Sapp against Kendo Kashin and Tamon Honda. Bob and Bobby were defeated. Since then, Lashley regularly performed in IGF. In 2011, he participated in the IGF Championship tournament. He won the first round match against Keith Hanson, but was defeated in semifinals by Josh Barnett. On June 26, 2013, Lashley signed a two-year contract with IGF, after winning the promotion's general election.

On October 20, 2012, Lashley wrestled Jay Bradley and Robert Anthony in a three-way match for the vacant Resistance Pro Wrestling Heavyweight Championship, which was won by Anthony. On December 27, 2014, Lashley defeated Mexx and Tiny Iron to win the IWS Heavyweight Championship.

=== Return to TNA / Impact Wrestling (2014–2018) ===
==== The Beat Down Clan (2014–2015) ====
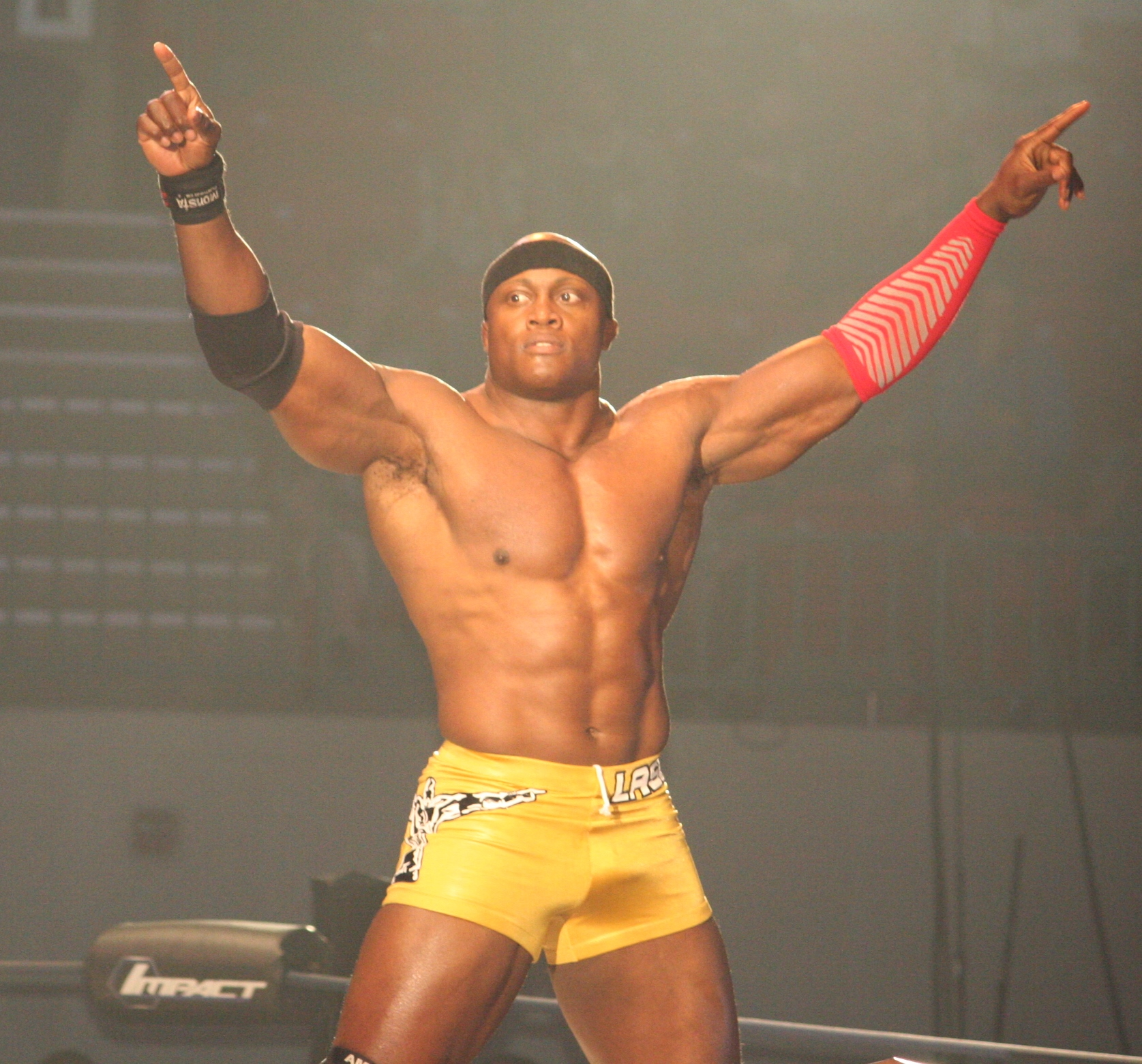
Lashley in October 2015.

On March 9, 2014, Lashley returned to TNA as a face at Lockdown in Miami, Florida, answering Ethan Carter III's open challenge after his scheduled opponent Kurt Angle could not wrestle due to an injury. On the March 20 episode of Impact Wrestling, Lashley and Carter had a rematch that once again ended in a no contest after an interference by Willow attacking Carter. During his second stint with the company, Lashley alternatively went by either his full ring name or the shortened "Lashley" mononym.

On the May 15 episode of Impact Wrestling, Lashley made his return after running out to the aid of Eric Young, but instead hit Young with a spear and allying himself along with MVP and Kenny King, turning heel in the process. At Slammiversary on June 15, Lashley defeated Samoa Joe to earn the right to challenge Young for the TNA World Heavyweight Championship in a steel cage match involving Austin Aries, but lost the match. Lashley defeated Young on the June 19 episode of Impact Wrestling to win the TNA World Heavyweight Championship, his first title in TNA, making him the first African American in TNA history to win the title, as well as his third world championship reign overall. He successfully defended the title on July 3 against Young. On June 25 (aired July 17), Lashley retained the title against Jeff Hardy. At Impact Wrestling: Destination X on July 31, Lashley successfully defended the title against Austin Aries, who had forfeited the X Division Championship for a title shot. At No Surrender on August 7 (aired September 17), Lashley successfully retained his title against Bobby Roode. On September 18, at the tapings for the October 28 episode of Impact Wrestling, Lashley lost the World Heavyweight Championship to Roode.

Lashley regained the championship on January 7, 2015, after interference from MVP, King, Samoa Joe and Low Ki, as well as Eric Young, all of whom formed a new group known as the Beat Down Clan, with the latter turning on Roode. When the group was established, MVP attempted to present Lashley as the centerpiece of the Clan as well as a "founding member" alongside King and himself. However, Lashley turned on them and the Beat Down Clan attacked him. This established Lashley as a face once again.

On the June 3 episode of Impact Wrestling, Lashley defeated Eric Young after Chris Melendez distracted Young. At Slammiversary on June 28, Lashley teamed with Mr. Anderson against Ethan Carter III and Tyrus in a losing effort. On the August 12 episode of Impact Wrestling, Lashley defeated Jessie Godderz in a qualifying match for the King of the Mountain match for the vacant TNA King of the Mountain Championship, which was won by PJ Black. On the August 26 episode of Impact Wrestling, Lashley competed in a four-way match for a shot at King of the Mountain Championship, which was won by Bobby Roode. On the September 16 episode of Impact Wrestling, Team TNA (Lashley, Drew Galloway, Davey Richards, Eddie Edwards and Bram) defeated Team GFW (Jeff Jarrett, Eric Young, Chris Mordetzky, Brian Myers and Sonjay Dutt) in a Lethal Lockdown match. On October 4 at Bound for Glory, Lashley unsuccessfully challenged Bobby Roode for the TNA King of the Mountain Championship. During October and November, Lashley began competing in the TNA World Title Series for the opportunity to win the vacant TNA World Heavyweight Championship, where he ended second in his block to successfully advance to round 16 where he defeated Drew Galloway to advance into the quarterfinals and Mahabali Shera to advance the semifinals, but he failed to qualify for the finals when he was defeated by the eventual winner Ethan Carter III.

==== World Heavyweight Champion (2016–2017) ====
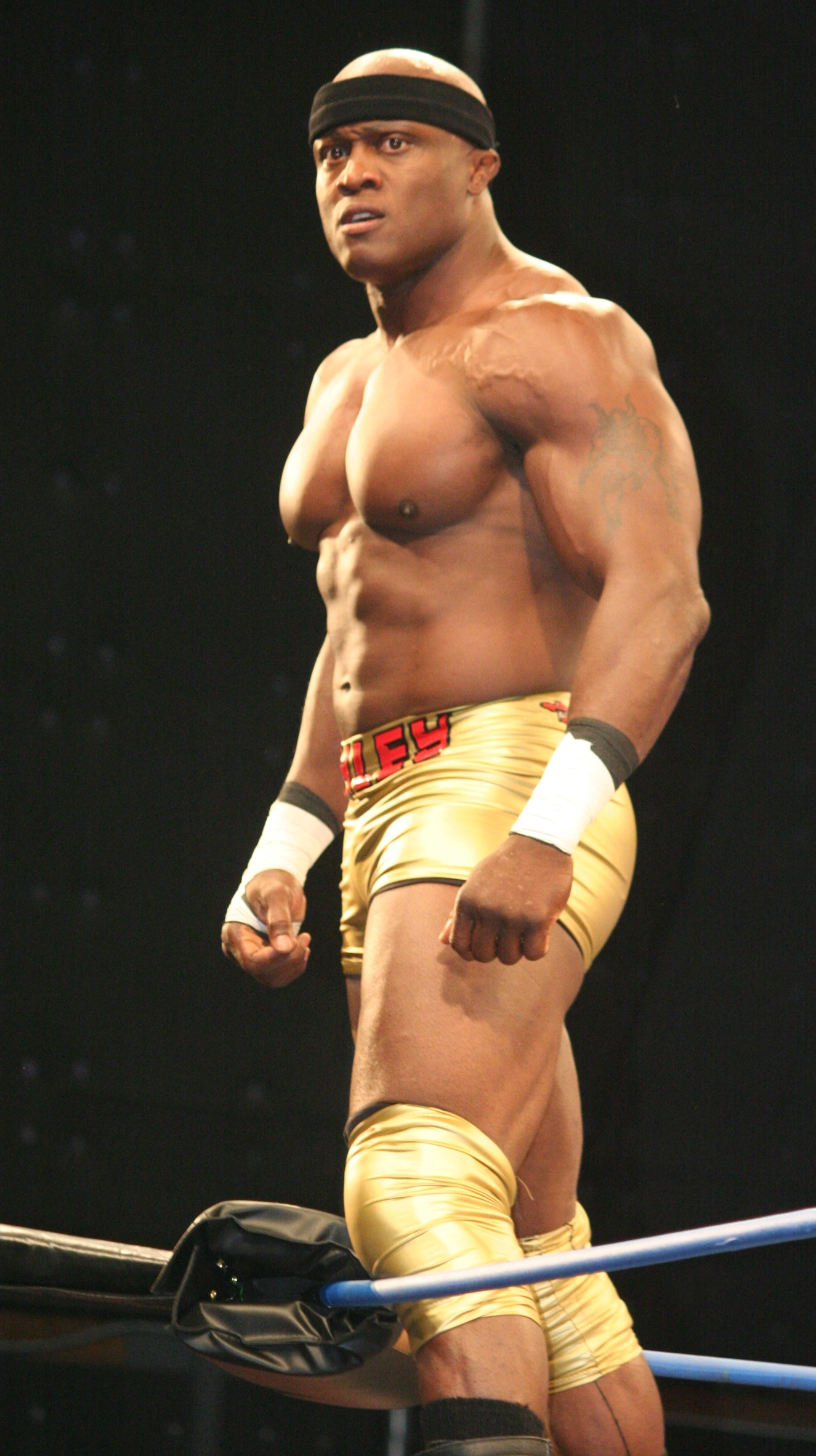
Lashley at Slammiversary XV

On the March 8 episode of Impact Wrestling, Lashley defeated Kurt Angle in Angle's farewell match with the company. After the match, he continued to assault Angle until he was run off by Drew Galloway, Eddie Edwards and Ethan Carter III, thus turning heel once again. The following week, Lashley attacked Josh Mathews and D'Angelo Dinero. On the March 22 episode of Impact Wrestling, Lashley competed in a gauntlet match to determine the number one contender to the TNA World Heavyweight Championship, but he was eliminated by an interfering D'Angelo Dinero. On the April 5 episode of Impact Wrestling, Lashley defeated Dinero in a street fight. On the May 3 episode of Impact Wrestling, Lashley won a three-way match against Jeff Hardy and Mike Bennett to earn a shot at the TNA World Heavyweight Championship against Drew Galloway. However, on the May 15 episode of Impact Wrestling, Lashley failed to win the title in a lumberjack match after a disqualification. On June 12 at Slammiversary, Lashley finally defeated Galloway by knockout in a Tap Out or Knockout match, starting his third reign as the TNA World Heavyweight Champion. At Destination X on July 12, Lashley defended his title against Eddie Edwards with Edwards' X Division Championship also on the line. However, the match ended in a no contest when Mike Bennett and the debuting Moose attacked him. On the July 21 episode of Impact Wrestling, Lashley defeated Edwards in a Winner Take All Six Sides of Steel match to retain the TNA World Heavyweight Championship and win the X Division Championship. On the August 11 episode of Impact Wrestling, Lashley defeated James Storm in to retain the TNA World Heavyweight and X Division Championships and win the TNA King of the Mountain Championship, after which he was confronted by TNA's newest acquisition Aron Rex, who observed Lashley from the ramp. On the October 3 episode of Impact Wrestling, Lashley lost the Impact world title to Eddie Edwards.

On the January 5 episode of Impact Wrestling, Lashley failed to regain the championship in a three-way match also involving Ethan Carter III, after interference from Davey Richards. At One Night Only: Live! on January 6, Lashley defeated Richards. The following week, he defeated Ethan Carter III in a Last Man Standing match to become the number one contender to the TNA World Heavyweight Championship. At the Genesis episode special of Impact Wrestling on January 8 (aired January 27), Lashley defeated Edwards in a 30-Minute Iron Man match to win his fourth TNA World Heavyweight Championship. On the January 12 episode of Impact Wrestling, he successfully retained his title against fellow mixed martial artist Josh Barnett. On the March 2 episode of Impact Wrestling, Lashley lost the TNA World Heavyweight Championship to Alberto El Patron. However, due to El Patron's controversial victory, the championship was returned to Lashley, leaving his title reign uninterrupted. He would however drop the title to El Patron on Slammiversary XV on July 2.

==== Final rivalries (2017–2018) ====
After losing a number one contender's match to Matt Sydal at Destination X on August 17 and failing to recapture the Impact World Championship in a Gauntlet for the Gold match, Lashley announced that he was (kayfabe) quitting wrestling to focus on his MMA career. This went into a feud against Moose where American Top Team were involved. At Bound for Glory on November 5, Lashley and King Mo defeated Moose and Stephan Bonnar in a Six Sides of Steel match.

Throughout the first months of 2018, Lashley had small feuds with oVe and Brian Cage, all of which were taped prior to his departure.

=== Return to WWE (2018–2024) ===
==== Universal Championship pursuits (2018–2019) ====
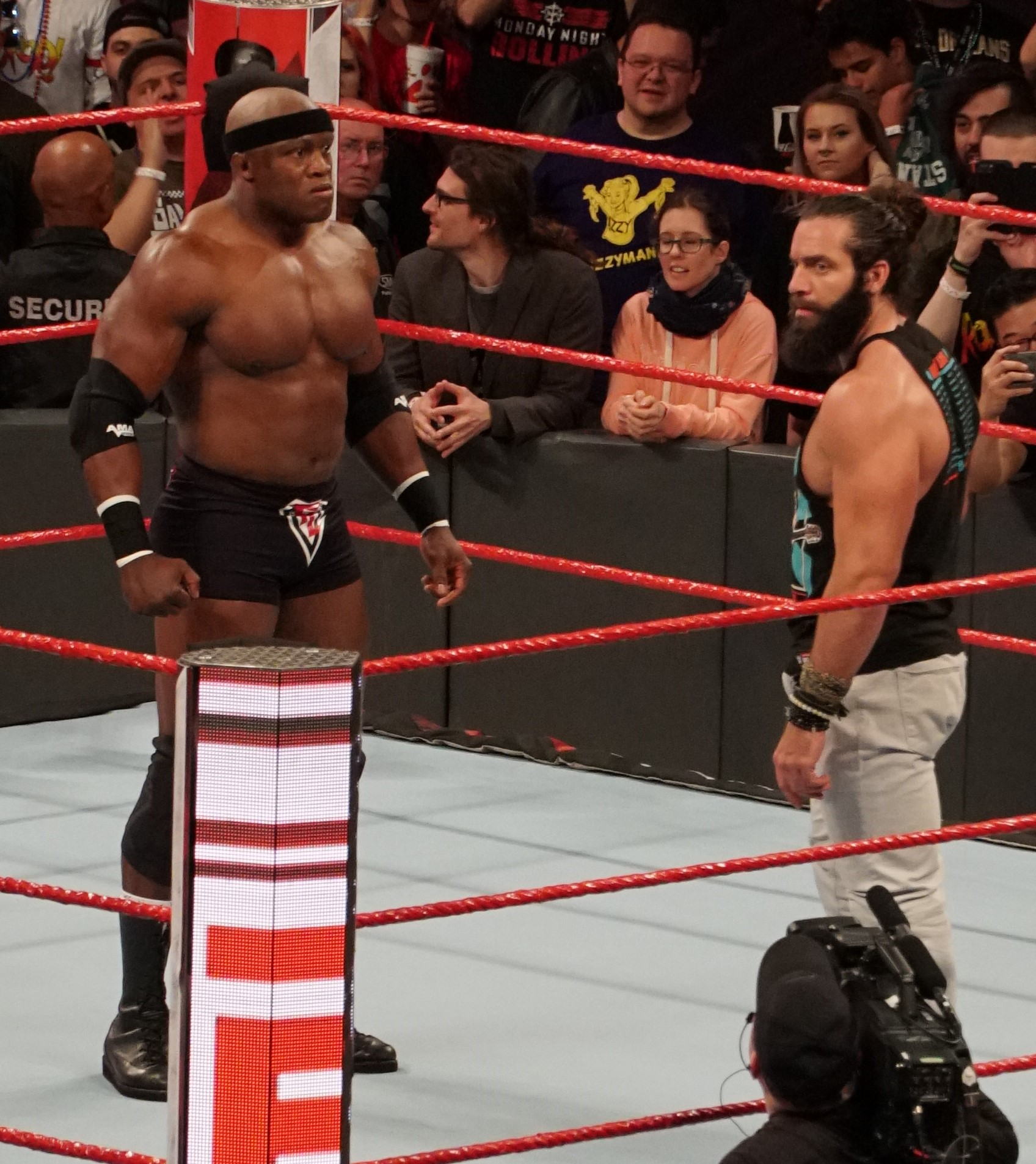
Lashley made his return to WWE by interrupting Elias in April 2018

On the April 9, 2018, episode of Raw, the night after WrestleMania 34, Lashley made his return to WWE after a 11-year absence, becoming a member of the Raw brand once again, where he confronted and attacked Elias with a chair. The first month of Lashley's return saw him in a number of tag-team matches, teaming with the likes of Braun Strowman, Bobby Roode, Finn Bálor, Seth Rollins, and Roman Reigns, all being in victorious efforts against the likes of Kevin Owens, Sami Zayn, Jinder Mahal, The Miz, Curtis Axel, and Bo Dallas. This marked his first WWE match since 2007. Lashley later teamed with Braun Strowman at Backlash on May 6 in a victorious effort against Kevin Owens and Sami Zayn. Following Backlash, Lashley entered into a feud with Sami Zayn, culminating with Lashley facing Zayn in a victorious effort at Money in the Bank on June 17. Lashley then entered a feud with Roman Reigns, where both men believed that they were the rightful challenger to the Universal Championship. This led to a match between the two at Extreme Rules on July 15, where Lashley defeated Reigns. The following night on Raw, two triple threat matches were set to determine who would face Universal Champion Brock Lesnar at SummerSlam on August 19, with Lashley and Reigns won their respective matches, setting up a number one contender's match between the two the following week, which Reigns won.

On the September 17 episode of Raw, Lashley introduced his new manager, Lio Rush. On the October 8 episode of Raw, Lashley defeated Kevin Owens before viciously attacking him post-match, turning heel. At Survivor Series on November 18, which was won by Team Raw, Lashley was among the sole survivors along with Braun Strowman and Drew McIntyre. He then reignited his feud with Elias, which included a ladder match with a guitar hanging above the ring at TLC: Tables, Ladders & Chairs on December 16, which Lashley lost, but after the match used the guitar on Elias. This sparked a Miracle on the 34th Street Fight type of match between the two, in which Lashley was defeated by Elias.

==== Intercontinental Champion (2019–2020) ====
On the January 14, 2019, episode of Raw, Lashley won the Intercontinental Championship for the first time in his career, from Dean Ambrose in a triple threat match that also involved Seth Rollins, beginning his first title reign in WWE since June 2007. At Royal Rumble on January 27, Lashley entered the Royal Rumble match as the 26th entrant, but was eliminated in thirteen seconds by the eventual winner Seth Rollins. At Elimination Chamber on February 17, Lashley lost his title to Finn Bálor in a handicap match also involving Lio Rush after Rush was pinned, ending his reign at 34 days. At Fastlane on March 10, Lashley teamed with Baron Corbin and Drew McIntyre against The Shield in a losing effort. The following night on Raw, Lashley defeated Finn Bálor following interference from Lio Rush, to capture the Intercontinental Championship, thus beginning his second reign. On the March 25 episode of Raw, Lashley teamed with Jinder Mahal against Finn Bálor in a losing effort after Mahal was pinned, and as per the match stipulation, Bálor earned himself an Intercontinental Championship rematch against Lashley. At WrestleMania 35 on April 7, Lashley lost the title to Bálor, ending his reign at 27 days.

At The Shield's Final Chapter event on April 21, Lashley teamed with Baron Corbin and Drew McIntyre to face The Shield in a losing effort. Lashley then feuded with Braun Strowman, culminating in a match between the two at Super ShowDown on June 7, which Lashley lost. On the June 17 episode of Raw, Strowman eliminated Lashley from a fatal five-way elimination match for an opportunity at the United States Championship; Lashley in turn helped in getting Strowman eliminated. The following week, Lashley attacked Strowman after losing a tug of war match. A falls count anywhere match on the July 1 episode ended in a no contest after Strowman tackled Lashley through the LED video wall of the entrance and both were taken to a local hospital. Following this, the two were scheduled for a Last Man Standing Match at Extreme Rules on July 14, which Lashley lost, thus ending their feud.

Lashley returned on the September 30 episode of Raw by interrupting Rusev, and he and Lana kissed, who is Rusev's wife. This started a feud with Rusev, where the pair tormented Rusev and were seen together in numerous romantic situations, including having a (storyline) marriage ceremony on the December 30 episode of Raw. At TLC: Tables, Ladders & Chairs on December 15, he defeated Rusev in a tables match after a distraction from Lana. On the February 17, 2020, episode of Raw, Lashley teamed with Angel Garza to defeat Rusev and Humberto Carrillo, thus ending their feud. At Super ShowDown on February 27, Lashley competed in the gauntlet match for the Tuwaiq Trophy, but failed to win as he was eliminated by R-Truth. On the second night of WrestleMania 36 on April 5, Lashley lost to Aleister Black.

==== The Hurt Business and WWE Champion (2020–2022) ====
On the May 11 episode of Raw, Lashley aligned himself with MVP, enraging Lana. The following week on Raw, they observed WWE Champion Drew McIntyre's match from the stage, and McIntyre stated he wanted to face Lashley at Backlash. At the event on June 14, Lashley failed to win the WWE Championship following interference from Lana. The following night on Raw, Lashley blamed Lana for his loss at Backlash and asked for a divorce, ending their romantic storyline. On the June 22 episode of Raw, Lashley attacked Apollo Crews and put him in his full nelson hold after he turned down MVP's offer to join them. Lashley and MVP were joined by Shelton Benjamin to create a stable known as The Hurt Business as they feuded with Crews, with Cedric Alexander later being recruited. At Payback on August 30, he defeated Crews to win his second United States Championship. Lashley retained the title at Clash of Champions on September 27 against Crews, at Hell in a Cell on October 25 against Slapjack. At Survivor Series on November 22, Lashley defeated Intercontinental Champion Sami Zayn in a champion vs. champion match. At Royal Rumble on January 31, 2021, Lashley entered the Royal Rumble match but was eliminated by multiple wrestlers.

At Elimination Chamber on February 21, he lost the title to Riddle in a triple threat match also involving John Morrison, ending his second reign at 175 days. Later that night, Lashley attacked Drew McIntyre, allowing The Miz to cash in his Money in the Bank briefcase to become WWE Champion. On the following episode of Raw, Lashley's attack on McIntyre was revealed to be part of a deal he and MVP made with The Miz, then Lashley defeated Braun Strowman to become the number one contender for the WWE Championship. On the March 1 episode of Raw, Lashley defeated The Miz in a lumberjack match to win the WWE Championship for the first time. On the March 8 episode of Raw, Lashley retained the title against Miz. On the March 29 episode of Raw, Lashley attacked Alexander and Benjamin due to them losing to McIntyre in a 2-on-1 handicap match, kicking them out of the faction. Lashley successfully defended the WWE Championship against Drew McIntyre on the first night of WrestleMania 37 on April 10, at WrestleMania Backlash on May 16 in a triple threat match also including Braun Strowman, and at Hell in a Cell on June 20 in a Last Chance Hell in a Cell match, thus ending their feud.

Lashley then feuded with Kofi Kingston where a match for the WWE Championship was made between the two at Money in the Bank. At the event on July 18, he retained the title against Kingston. On the following episode of Raw, Goldberg made his return to challenge Lashley for the WWE Championship. Lashley declined the challenge at first, but on the August 2 episode of Raw, Lashley accepted Goldberg's challenge and the match would be made official for SummerSlam. At the event on August 21, Lashley retained the WWE Championship due to referee stoppage after Goldberg could no longer continue.

On the September 13 episode of Raw, after successfully defending the title against Randy Orton, Lashley lost the WWE Championship to Big E who cashed in his Money in the Bank briefcase, ending his reign at 196 days. At Extreme Rules on September 26, Lashley teamed with AJ Styles and Omos to face The New Day in a losing effort. The following night on Raw, Lashley faced Big E for the WWE Championship but the match ended in disqualification after Benjamin and Alexander helped Lashley fight off The New Day, seemingly reuniting The Hurt Business. WWE official Adam Pearce then issued a rematch to take place in a steel cage, where Big E defeated Lashley.

On the October 4 episode of Raw, Goldberg called out Lashley and in response, Lashley challenged Goldberg to a No Holds Barred match at Crown Jewel. At the event on October 21, Goldberg defeated Lashley to end their feud. On the November 8 episode of Raw, Lashley defeated Dominik Mysterio, taking his place on Team Raw in the Men's Survivor Series match. At Survivor Series on November 21, Lashley was eliminated via count out, but Team Raw still won with Seth Rollins being the sole survivor. On the December 13 episode of Raw, he defeated Seth Rollins, Kevin Owens, and WWE Champion Big E in the same night to be added to the triple threat match for the WWE Championship at Day 1, making it a fatal four-way match. At the event on January 1, 2022, he failed to win the title as Brock Lesnar got added to the match and won the title. He defeated Lesnar at the Royal Rumble on January 29 to win his second WWE Championship after interference from Roman Reigns, but lost it at Elimination Chamber on February 19 due to suffering a (kayfabe) concussion during the match.

==== United States Champion (2022–2023) ====
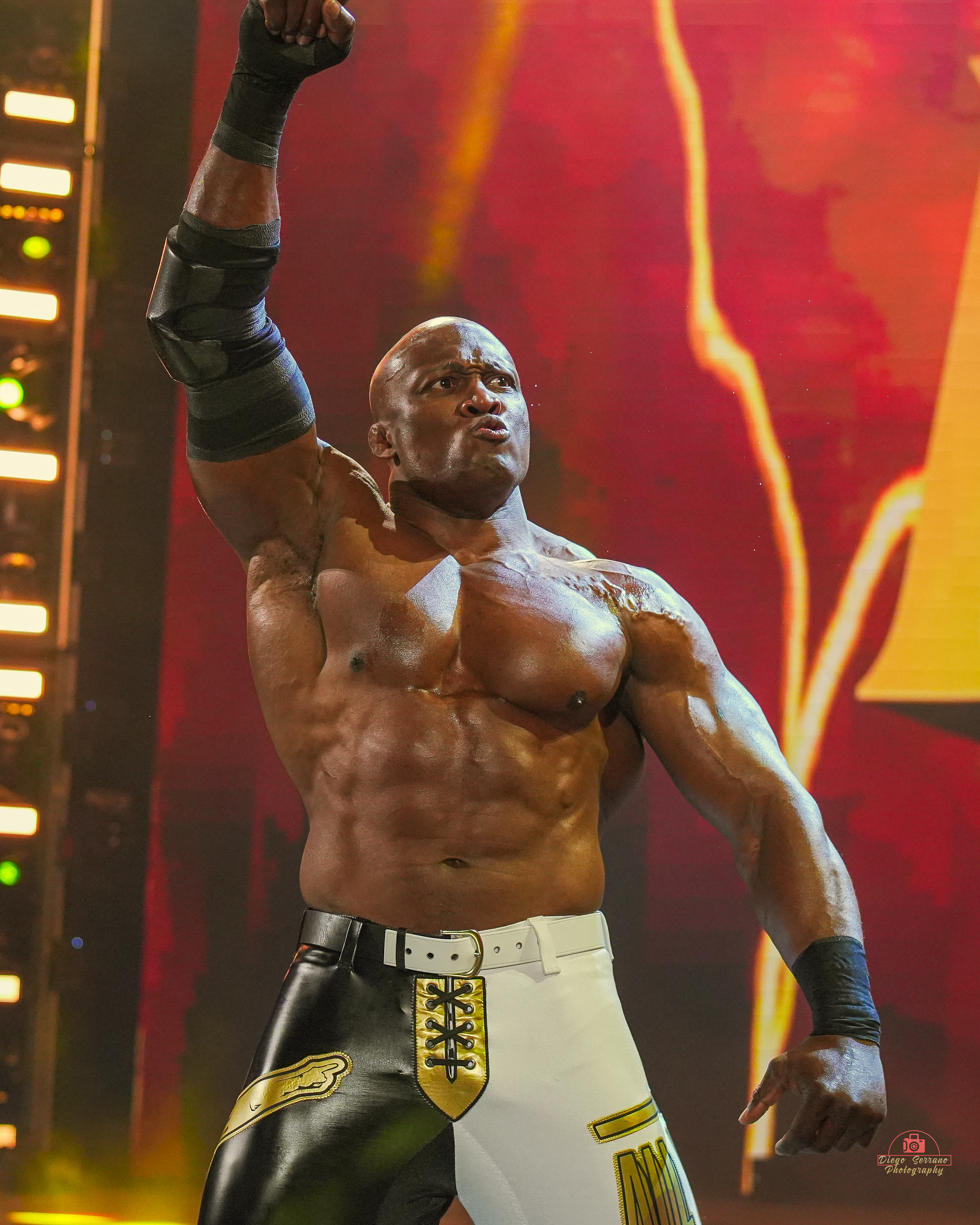
Lashley in 2023

On the March 28 episode of Raw, Lashley made his return from injury, responding to the demonstration of dominance by Omos, setting up a match between the two at WrestleMania 38, turning face for the first time since October 2018. On the second night of the event on April 3, Lashley defeated Omos, thus ending his undefeated streak. On the Raw after WrestleMania 38, MVP turned on Lashley and aligned with Omos, thus solidifying Lashley's face turn. Lashley lost to Omos at WrestleMania Backlash on May 8 after a distraction from MVP, but defeated him in a steel cage match on the May 16 episode of Raw. At Hell in a Cell on June 5, Lashley defeated Omos and MVP in a 2-on-1 handicap match, ending their feud. Lashley then began a feud with United States Champion Theory, culminating in a match between the two at Money in the Bank on July 2, where Lashley defeated Theory to win his third United States Championship. A title rematch was scheduled for SummerSlam on July 30, where Lashley again retained. Over the following weeks, Lashley successfully defended the championship against the likes of Tommaso Ciampa, AJ Styles, The Miz in a Steel Cage match, and Seth "Freakin" Rollins.

On the October 10 episode of Raw, Lashley lost the United States Championship to Rollins in a rematch after being attacked by a returning Brock Lesnar before the match, ending his third reign at 100 days. At Crown Jewel on November 5, Lashley lost to Lesnar despite dominating the majority of the match; afterwards, Lashley viciously attacked Lesnar. Two nights later on Raw, Lashley answered Rollins' open challenge for the United States Championship, but proceeded to attack Rollins before the match started. After Austin Theory cashed in his Money in the Bank contract on Rollins, Lashley interfered, allowing Rollins to retain the title. At Survivor Series: WarGames on November 26, Lashley failed to regain the United States Championship from Rollins in a triple threat match as the match was won by Theory. On the January 16, 2023, episode of Raw, Lashley won a six-pack challenge for a title shot against Theory at Raw Is XXX the following week, but failed to regain the title in a No Disqualification match after interference from the returning Brock Lesnar. At the Royal Rumble on January 28, Lashley entered the Royal Rumble match at No. 13, eliminating Lesnar before being eliminated by Seth "Freakin" Rollins. At Elimination Chamber on February 18, Lashley defeated Lesnar by disqualification after Lesnar performed a low blow on Lashley, ending their feud. On the WrestleMania edition of SmackDown on March 31, Lashley won the André the Giant Memorial Battle Royal. At Backlash on May 6, Lashley faced Theory and Bronson Reed in a triple threat match for the United States Championship, where he was unsuccessful.

As part of the 2023 WWE Draft, Lashley was drafted to the SmackDown brand. Lashley would then be selected amongst a group of SmackDown superstars to participate in a tournament to determine the inaugural champion of the newly introduced World Heavyweight Championship. On the May 12 episode of SmackDown, Lashley defeated Theory and Sheamus in a triple threat match, before facing AJ Styles in the semifinals in a losing effort.

==== The Pride (2023–2024) ====
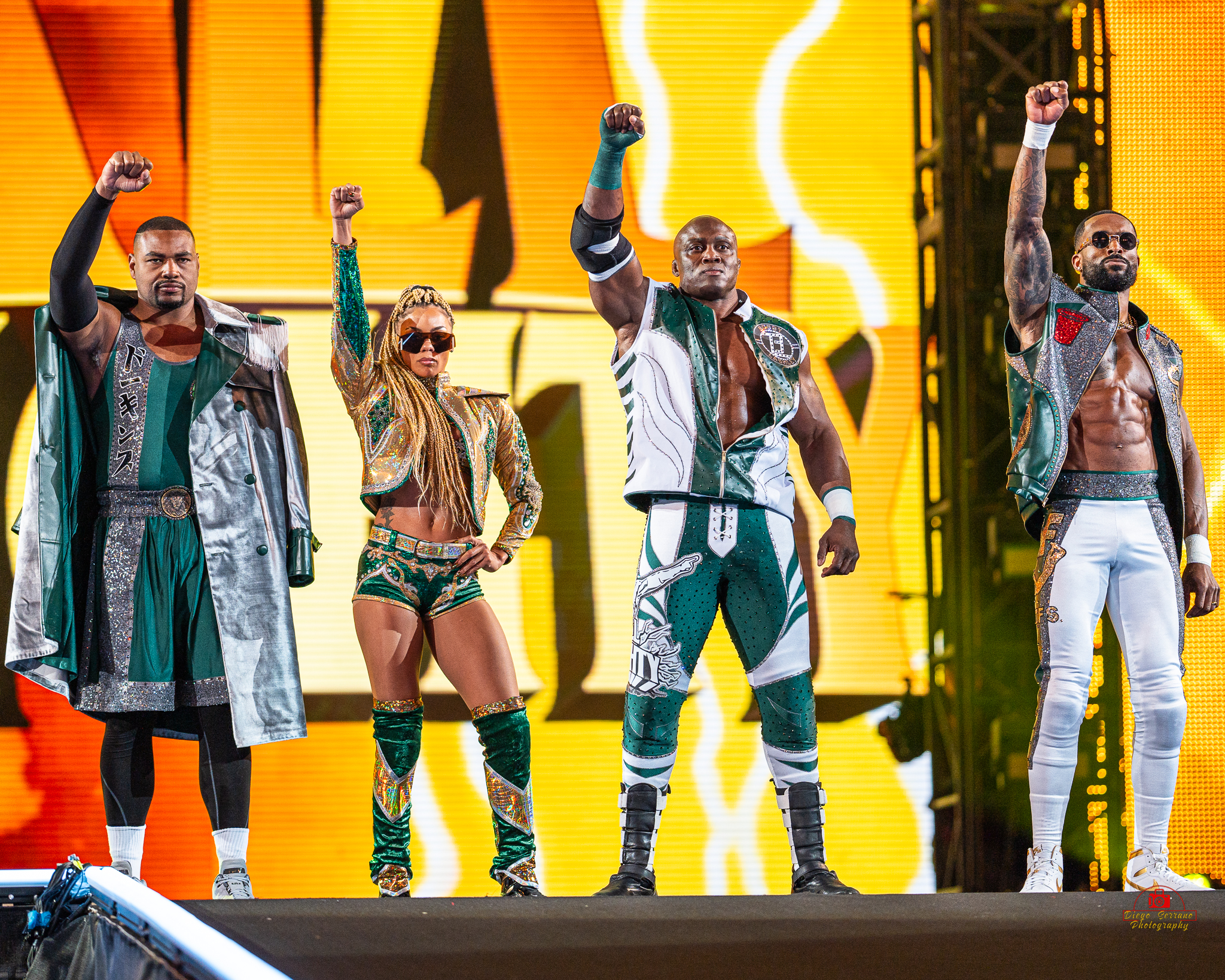
The Pride making their entrance at WrestleMania XL in 2024

On the July 14 episode of SmackDown, a returning Lashley appeared in a backstage segment with The Street Profits (Angelo Dawkins and Montez Ford) to recruit them to form an alliance. On the August 4 episode of SmackDown, Lashley appeared to celebrate The Street Profits beating down Luke Gallows and Karl Anderson and The Brawling Brutes' Butch and Ridge Holland, turning heel once again. Lashley and The Street Profits teamed up for a match for the first time to face the Latino World Order (LWO) in a six-man tag team match at Fastlane. A day before the event on SmackDown, the trio took out the LWO's Cruz Del Toro and Joaquin Wilde to leave the LWO a man short for the match. At the event on October 7, a returning Carlito teamed up with Rey Mysterio and Santos Escobar for the LWO to win the match.

On the December 8 episode of SmackDown, Lashley defeated Karrion Kross to advance in the United States Championship #1 Contender Tournament. He then lost to Santos Escobar in the second round of the tournament after interference from Angel Garza and Humberto Carrillo. At SmackDown: New Year's Revolution on January 5, 2024, Lashley turned face after being attacked by Kross and the returning Authors of Pain. On January 27 at Royal Rumble, Lashley entered the Royal Rumble match at number 11, eliminating Carlito and Kross before being eliminated by Kross after he was eliminated by Lashley. Lashley defeated Bronson Reed on the February 12 episode of Raw to qualify for the men's Elimination Chamber match at the titular event on February 24, where he was eliminated by Drew McIntyre. On Night 2 of WrestleMania XL on April 7, Lashley and the Street Profits defeated The Final Testament in a Philadelphia Street Fight (with Bubba Ray Dudley as special guest referee), ending their feud. Lashley's final appearance on WWE programming was during the May 3 edition of Smackdown!, where he confronted Carmelo Hayes backstage. His final match was in a house show on May 5, where he defeated Santos Escobar. On August 16, Lashley's contract expired and his profile was moved to the alumni section of WWE's website, officially ending his second tenure with the promotion.

=== All Elite Wrestling (2024–present) ===
In September 2024, Lashley signed with All Elite Wrestling (AEW). He made his debut at Fright Night Dynamite on October 30, where he attacked Swerve Strickland and reunited with former Hurt Business members MVP and Shelton Benjamin, who reformed the group under the new name "The Hurt Syndicate", establishing himself as a heel in the process. On the November 20 episode of Dynamite, Lashey made his AEW in-ring debut, where he defeated Cheeseburger and Joe Keys in a two-on-one handicap match. On November 23 at Full Gear, Lashley defeated Strickland.

On the January 22, 2025, episode of Dynamite, Lashley and Benjamin defeated Private Party (Isiah Kassidy and Marq Quen) to win the AEW World Tag Team Championship. This marked Lashley's first ever tag championship in a major promotion. On the February 12 episode of Dynamite, Lashley and Benjamin defeated The Gunns (Austin Gunn and Colten Gunn) in their first title defense. On March 9 at Revolution, Lashley and Benjamin successfully defended their titles against The Outrunners (Truth Magnum and Turbo Floyd). On April 6 at Dynasty, Lashley and Benjamin successfully defended their titles against Big Bill and Bryan Keith of The Learning Tree after assistance from MJF, who had been trying to join The Hurt Syndicate in the weeks leading up to Dynasty. On May 14 at Dynamite: Beach Break, Lashley, Benjamin, and MVP accepted MJF as a member of the group. On May 25 at Double or Nothing, Lashley and Benjamin successfully defended their titles against Sons of Texas (Dustin Rhodes and Sammy Guevara). On July 12 at All In, Lashley and Benjamin successfully defended their titles in a three-way tag team match against JetSpeed (Kevin Knight and "Speedball" Mike Bailey) and The Patriarchy (Christian Cage and Nick Wayne). On the July 23 episode of Dynamite, The Hurt Syndicate (minus MJF) would turn into tweeners as they would be briefly hired by Cope to assist him in his feud with FTR (Cash Wheeler and Dax Harwood). After weeks of tension, The Hurt Syndicate kicked MJF out of the group due to his selfish attitude on the August 6 episode of Dynamite. On August 24 at Forbidden Door, Lashley and Benjamin lost their titles to Brodido (Bandido and Brody King) in a three-way match, ending their reign at 214 days.

After losing the tag titles, The Hurt Syndicate then began a feud with The Demand (Ricochet, Bishop Kaun, and Toa Liona), losing to them at All Out on September 20 in a regular trios match, but defeated them in a rematch at Dynamite: Title Tuesday on October 7 in a Street Fight and on October 12 at WrestleDream in a tornado trios match to become the number one contenders for the AEW World Trios Championship, but failed to defeat The Opps (Samoa Joe, Powerhouse Hobbs, and Katsuyori Shibata) for the titles after Ricochet interfered. In December 2025, it was reported that Lashley had suffered an injury and would miss "substantial time".

On the April 2, 2026 episode of Collision, Lashley returned to AEW television with his stablemates in a backstage segment. At Double or Nothing on May 24, Benjamin and Lashley were a part of Jericho's team in Stadium Stampede, where they defeated Ricochet's team.

== Professional wrestling style and persona ==
Lashley uses the spear and the swinging full nelson submission hold, known as the Hurt Lock, as finishers. Former WWE wrestler Chris Masters commented on his former finisher being used, stating: "It's funny when he first started using it. All the mentions of people saying 'That's The Master Lock, not The Hurt Lock.' I'd be lying if I didn't say it didn't create an opportunity, even if it was small. You know, who's got the best Full Nelson in professional wrestling." His nicknames are "The Dominator" - as he was known during his early WWE career, during this point he used an inverted powerbomb and then a front powerslam as finishers referring to each as the Dominator respectively - and "The All Mighty", coined by then-manager Lio Rush, which would continue to be used during his first WWE Championship reign.

== Mixed martial arts career ==
Bobby Lashley
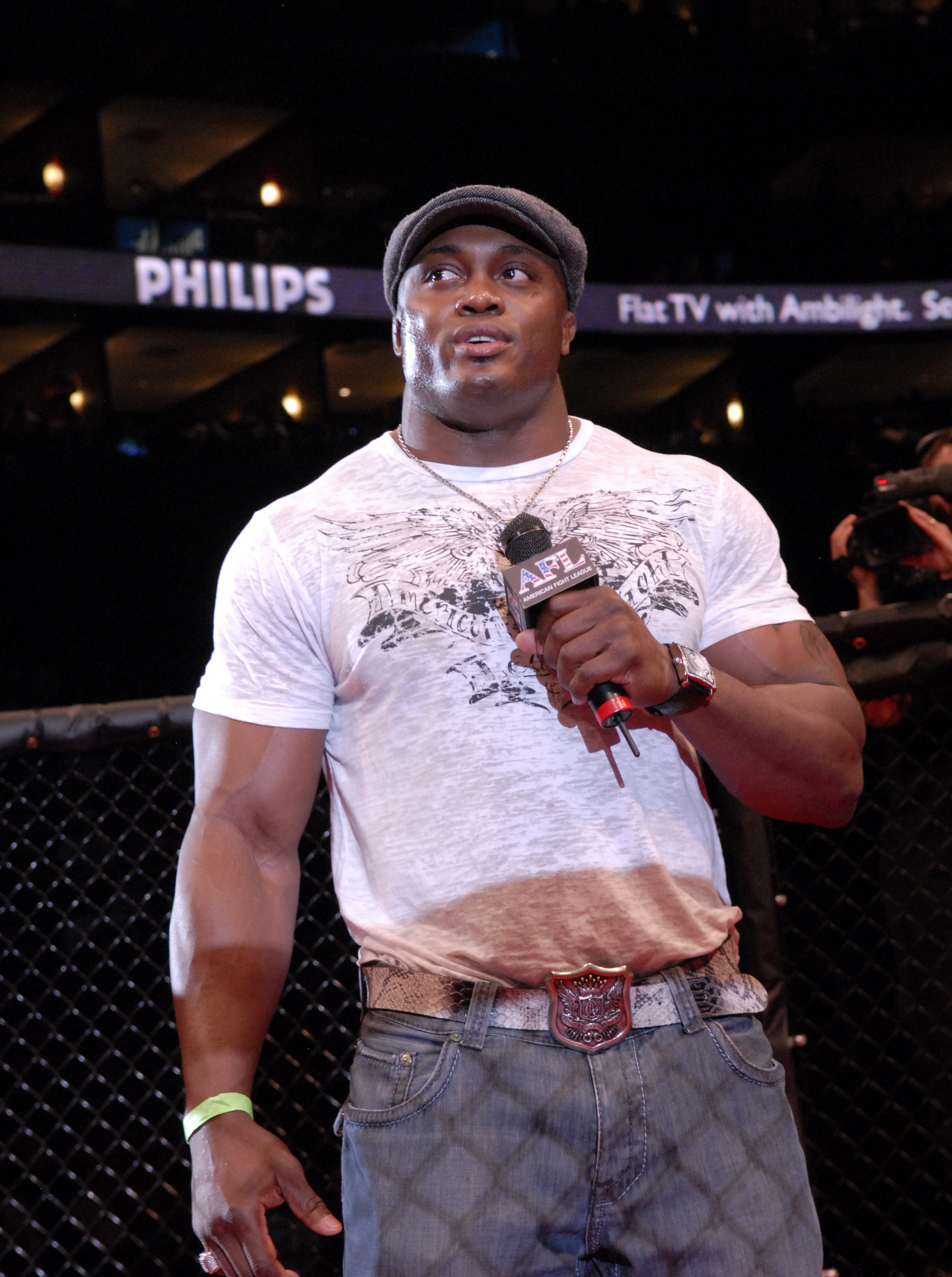
- Lashley in 2008
- Other names: The Boss; The Dominator; The Pressure Cooker; The Real Heel Deal
- Height: 6 ft 3 in (1.91 m)
- Weight: 255 lb (116 kg; 18 st 3 lb)
- Division: Heavyweight
- Reach: 78 in (198 cm)
- Stance: Orthodox
- Fighting out of: Denver, Colorado
- Team: American Kickboxing Academy, American Top Team, American Top Team Altitude, CSW
- Trainer: Josh Barnett
- Wrestling: NAIA Wrestling
- Years active: 2008–2016

Mixed martial arts record
- Total: 17
- Wins: 15
- By knockout: 6
- By submission: 6
- By decision: 3
- Losses: 2
- By knockout: 1
- By decision: 1

Other information
- Mixed martial arts record from Sherdog

=== Early career (2008–2009) ===
Lashley made his mixed martial arts debut at the Mixed Fighting Alliance (MFA) inaugural event "There Will Be Blood" on December 13, 2008, at the American Airlines Arena in Miami, Florida. He won via TKO (cut) over Joshua Franklin in 41 seconds of the first round. Lashley's next fight was on March 21, 2009. He was supposed to fight Ken Shamrock, but his opponent was changed to Bellator MMA veteran Jason Guida after Shamrock tested positive for steroids. Lashley won the fight after a unanimous decision. Lashley signed with the Maximum Fighting Championship and made his debut on May 15 against Mike Cook, who made his ring entrance wearing a Rey Mysterio mask, which Lashley took as an insult. He went on to defeat Cook with a guillotine choke just 24 seconds into the first round. On June 27, 2009, Lashley defeated Bob Sapp at the PFP: Ultimate Chaos event in Biloxi, Mississippi. He won the bout via TKO (strikes) in the first round, making Lashley's MMA record 4–0.

=== Strikeforce (2010–2011) ===
He was scheduled to make his Strikeforce debut against undefeated heavyweight Shane Del Rosario at Strikeforce: Miami, but for unknown reasons, Strikeforce decided to change his opponent. Lashley was then expected to face journeyman Jimmy Ambriz on January 30, 2010, at Strikeforce: Miami, but that matchup was also scrapped. Lashley wound up facing former UFC fighter Wes Sims at the event. Lashley defeated Sims via 1st-round TKO victory to remain undefeated.

Lashley was expected to fight on April 17, 2010, at Strikeforce: Nashville, as the promotion had already submitted an opponent for Lashley and was awaiting approval from the Tennessee Athletic Commission. According to Strikeforce CEO Scott Coker, the bout would likely be the fourth bout on the CBS televised portion of the event. On April 5, Lashley confirmed that he will not appear on the card since Strikeforce officials could not guarantee an appearance on the televised portion of the card due to time constraints. Bobby was set to appear at Strikeforce: Los Angeles in June fighting Ron Sparks however he suffered a knee injury and did not compete.

Lashley faced Chad Griggs at Strikeforce: Houston on August 21, 2010. Lashley came out shooting the takedown, and ground and pounding. Lashley dominated at first, but Griggs caught him with a series of uppercuts on one of the takedowns in the first round, opening a gash under the left corner of Lashley's left eye. Lashley had trouble keeping Griggs from striking him, even though he had dominate control over him on the ground, but Griggs was still finding openings on the bottom. Lashley was able to continue in the second round, continuing takedowns and ground and pound. Lashley eventually passed to mount halfway through the second round and unloaded many good punches on Griggs while maintaining control. Referee Jon Schorle then asked the fighters to stand up due to inactivity, despite Lashley being in full mount at the time. Lashley later complained to the referee about the cut under his eye, and with 33 seconds left in the second round, referee Jon Schorle asked the ringside doctor to inspect the cut. However, with Lashley deciding to continue fighting, controversy was created when referee Jon Schorle did not put Lashley back in the mount position as he was when the fight was originally stopped. Griggs then sprawled out of a desperate takedown by Lashley near the end of round two and hammer-fisted Lashley's eye that was already cut until the round ended. The ring doctor then stopped the fight, resulting in Lashley losing at the end of the second round by TKO. Backstage after the fight, Lashley was taken off on a stretcher due to dehydration. Following the fight it was discovered that Lashley was suffering from mono and was subsequently unable to train for four months.

=== Titan Fighting Championship (2011, 2013) ===
On February 18, 2011, Titan Fighting Championship had announced the signing of Lashley. He was expected to debut against James Jack however on March 16, 2011, officials announced they had lost contact with Jack and instead John Ott stepped in to fight Lashley. The pace of the fight slowed down drastically in the second round, where Lashley began to display the same cardio problems that affected him in his previous fight. He was able to win a unanimous decision, despite suffering the effects of illness.

Lashley was scheduled to fight Eddie Sanchez at Titan Fighting Championships 19. But on July 22, 2011, it was announced that Lashley withdrew from the fight for personal reasons.

Lashley defeated Kevin Asplund at Titan Fighting Championships 25 on June 7, 2013, winning via keylock submission.

=== Shark Fights (2011–2012) ===
Lashley has signed a three-year deal with Shark Fights and was expected to make his debut against Darrill Schoonover in November, The fight was to be for the heavyweight title. However Schoonover later pulled out of the bout due to an injury. Lashley was then set to headline Shark Fights 21 against Tim Hague. But Hague pulled out of the bout for unknown reasons and was replaced by Dave Huckaba. On November 7 it was confirmed that the fight with Huckaba had been scrapped for unknown reasons, Lashley was then scheduled to face Mark Martinez but Martinez was later pulled out of the bout due to expired blood work.

On November 11, 2011, Lashley became the new Shark Fights Heavyweight champion defeating Karl Knothe in the first round by submission. Knothe was the fifth different opponent scheduled to face Lashley after numerous fighters pulled out due to various reasons.

=== Various promotions (2012–2014) ===
He next competed at India's Super Fight League's third event, SFL 3, against James Thompson. Lashley lost the fight via unanimous decision.

Lashley was scheduled to face Matthew Larson at GWC: The British Invasion: U.S. vs. U.K. on June 29, 2013. Lashley won via rear naked choke submission in round one. In an interview with MMA Junkie the day prior to his GWC fight, Lashley indicated that he had two potential fights lined up for August 2013, saying "If I'm going to fight, I need to fight. I need to stay active. I need to do something big now. If not, I need to hang it up and just do stuff with my gym. I'm fighting this fight, and I think I have two in August that were offered to me. Hopefully if I don't get hurt, I can stay active and just keep going."

Lashley fought at Xtreme Fight Night 15: Indestructible on November 8, 2013, against Tony "The Rock" Melton, which he won via unanimous decision.

=== Bellator MMA (2014–2018) ===
In July 2014, it was announced that Lashley had signed with Bellator MMA. He made his promotional debut against Josh Burns on September 5, 2014, at Bellator 123. Lashley won the fight via rear-naked choke submission in the second round.

In his second fight for the promotion, Lashley faced undefeated Karl Etherington on October 24, 2014, at Bellator 130. He won via submission due to punches, in the first round.

A rematch with James Thompson was scheduled to take place at Bellator 134 on February 27, 2015; however, Lashley pulled out of the fight due to injury. In March 2015, Lashley signed a long-term contract extension with the promotion. The fight with Thompson was rescheduled for Bellator 138 on June 19, 2015; however, an injury forced Thompson out of the bout and Lashley instead faced Dan Charles at the event. He won the fight via TKO in the second round. The rematch with Thompson eventually took place on November 6, 2015, at Bellator 145. Lashley won the fight via TKO in the first round.

On August 29, 2016, it was announced that Lashley would face Josh Appelt on October 21, 2016, at Bellator 162. Lashley won via rear-naked choke submission in the second round. In April 2018, Bellator officials stated Lashley was still under contract with Bellator after his WWE return. However, Lashley would never fight again for the promotion and confirmed his retirement from MMA in a February 2022 interview with Ariel Helwani on The MMA Hour.

== Personal life ==
Lashley's first daughter, Kyra, was born in 2005. He was in a relationship with fellow professional wrestler Kristal Marshall, with whom he had a son named Myles in 2008 and a daughter named Naomi in 2011.

Lashley has been involved in several business ventures. In 2007, he opened up a health smoothie shop. In July 2009, he announced the launch of the Lashley Network of websites, comprising his official gym, nutrition store, and social media pages. In a press release for the launch, he stated that he was aiming to keep his reputation and name in the public eye so he could reach his goal of being the top MMA fighter.

== Other media ==
Lashley made his video game debut as a playable character in WWE SmackDown vs Raw 2007 and has since appeared in WWE SmackDown vs Raw 2008, WWE 2K19 (DLC), WWE 2K20, WWE 2K22, WWE 2K23, and WWE 2K24.

=== Filmography ===
Film
Year	Title	Role	Notes
2009	The Way of War	Tattooed Hispanic Man	
2010	Beatdown	Lucius	
2011	Blood Out	Hector	
2011	Walk-ins Welcome	Felix	
2022	Green Ghost and the Masters of the Stone		

Television
Year	Title	Role	Notes
2007	Deal or No Deal	Himself	
2016	Rush Hour	Bar Thug	
2024	Celebrity Family Feud	Himself	Part of Team Men of WWE with The Street Profits (Montez Ford and Angelo Dawkins), Austin Theory and LA Knight. The episode was filmed before Lashley left WWE.

Music videos
Year	Song	Artist	Role
2012	Nightmare	Kasland	Asylum Orderly

== Luchas de Apuestas record ==
Winner (wager)	Loser (wager)	Location	Event	Date	Notes
Bobby Lashley (Donald Trump's hair)	Umaga (Vince McMahon's hair)	Detroit, Michigan	WrestleMania 23	April 1, 2007	(Note: Stone Cold Steve Austin was the special guest referee.)

== Mixed martial arts record ==
Professional record breakdown
17 matches	15 wins	2 losses
By knockout	6	1
By submission	6	0
By decision	3	1

Res.	Record	Opponent	Method	Event	Date	Round	Time	Location	Notes
Win	15–2	Josh Appelt	Submission (rear-naked choke)	Bellator 162	October 21, 2016	2	1:43	Memphis, Tennessee, United States	
Win	14–2	James Thompson	TKO (punches)	Bellator 145	November 6, 2015	1	0:54	St. Louis, Missouri, United States	
Win	13–2	Dan Charles	TKO (punches)	Bellator 138	June 19, 2015	2	4:14	St. Louis, Missouri, United States	
Win	12–2	Karl Etherington	TKO (submission to punches)	Bellator 130	October 24, 2014	1	1:31	Mulvane, Kansas, United States	
Win	11–2	Josh Burns	Submission (rear-naked choke)	Bellator 123	September 5, 2014	2	3:54	Uncasville, Connecticut, United States	
Win	10–2	Tony Melton	Decision (unanimous)	Xtreme Fight Night 15	November 8, 2013	5	5:00	Catoosa, Oklahoma, United States	Won the XFN Heavyweight Championship.
Win	9–2	Matthew Larson	Submission (rear-naked choke)	GWC: The British Invasion: U.S. vs. U.K.	June 29, 2013	1	1:38	Kansas City, Missouri, United States	
Win	8–2	Kevin Asplund	Submission (americana)	Titan FC 25	June 7, 2013	2	1:23	Fort Riley, Kansas, United States	
Loss	7–2	James Thompson	Decision (unanimous)	Super Fight League 3: Lashley vs. Thompson	May 6, 2012	3	5:00	New Delhi, India	
Win	7–1	Karl Knothe	Submission (americana)	Shark Fights 21: Knothe vs. Lashley	November 11, 2011	1	3:44	Lubbock, Texas, United States	Won the Shark Fights Heavyweight Championship.
Win	6–1	John Ott	Decision (unanimous)	Titan FC 17	March 25, 2011	3	5:00	Kansas City, Kansas, United States	
Loss	5–1	Chad Griggs	TKO (doctor stoppage)	Strikeforce: Houston	August 21, 2010	2	5:00	Houston, Texas, United States	
Win	5–0	Wes Sims	TKO (punches)	Strikeforce: Miami	January 30, 2010	1	2:06	Sunrise, Florida, United States	
Win	4–0	Bob Sapp	TKO (submission to punches)	FFI: Ultimate Chaos	June 27, 2009	1	3:17	Biloxi, Mississippi, United States	
Win	3–0	Mike Cook	Technical Submission (guillotine choke)	MFC 21	May 15, 2009	1	0:24	Enoch, Alberta, Canada	
Win	2–0	Jason Guida	Decision (unanimous)	SRP: March Badness	March 21, 2009	3	5:00	Pensacola, Florida, United States	
Win	1–0	Joshua Franklin	TKO (doctor stoppage)	MFA: There Will Be Blood	December 13, 2008	1	0:41	Miami, Florida, United States	Heavyweight debut.

== Championships and accomplishments ==
=== Amateur wrestling ===
- International Federation of Associated Wrestling Styles
  - NYAC Christmas Tournament Senior Freestyle Silver Medalist (2001)
- International Military Sports Council
  - CISM Armed Forces Championships Senior Freestyle Gold Medalist (2003)
  - CISM Armed Forces Championships Senior Freestyle Silver Medalist (2002)
  - CISM Military World Championships Senior Freestyle Silver Medalist (2002)
- USA Wrestling
  - Third in the USA World Team Trials Senior Freestyle (2003)
- National Association of Intercollegiate Athletics
  - NAIA All-American (1995, 1996, 1997, 1998)
  - NAIA Collegiate National Championship (1996, 1997, 1998)
- Kansas Wrestling Coaches Association
  - KWCA Collegiate Wrestler of the Year (1998)
- National High School Coaches Association
  - NHSCA Senior All-American (1994)
- Kansas State High School Activities Association
  - KSHSAA 6A All-State (1993, 1994)
  - KSHSAA 6A High School State Championship (1994)
  - KSHSAA 6A High School State Championship Runner-up (1993)

=== Mixed martial arts ===
- Shark Fights
  - Shark Fights Heavyweight Championship (1 time)
- Xtreme Fight Night
  - XFN Heavyweight Championship (1 time)

=== Professional wrestling ===
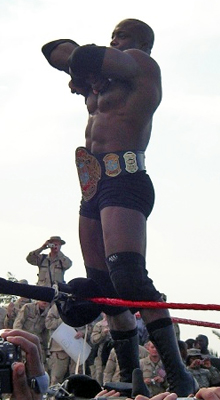
In WWE, Lashley is a two-time ECW World Champion.

- 4th Rope Wrestling
  - 4th Rope Heavyweight Championship (1 time, current)
- Australian Championship Wrestling
  - ACW World Championship (1 time, current)
- All Elite Wrestling
  - AEW World Tag Team Championship (1 time) – with Shelton Benjamin
- Alabama Wrestling Federation
  - AWF Tag Team Championship (1 time) – with The Boogeyman
- Italian Wrestling Superstar
  - IWS Heavyweight Championship (1 time)
- Pro Wrestling Illustrated
  - Most Improved Wrestler of the Year (2006)
  - Rookie of the Year (2005)
  - Ranked No. 3 of the top 500 singles wrestlers in the PWI 500 in 2021
- Total Nonstop Action Wrestling / Impact Wrestling
  - TNA World Heavyweight Championship (4 times)
  - TNA King of the Mountain Championship (1 time, final)
  - TNA X Division Championship (1 time)
  - TNA Championship Series (2009)
  - TNA Joker's Wild (2015)
- WWE
  - WWE Championship (2 times)
  - ECW World Championship (2 times)
  - WWE Intercontinental Championship (2 times)
  - WWE United States Championship (3 times)
  - André the Giant Memorial Battle Royal (2023)
  - Slammy Award (1 time)
    - Trash Talker of the Year (2020) from The Hurt Business
