= 4th Rope Heavyweight Championship =

Heavyweight professional wrestling championship

Details
- Promotion: 4th Rope Wrestling
- Date established: November 2, 2024
- Current champion: Bobby Lashley
- Date won: November 12, 2026

The 4th Rope Heavyweight Championship is a professional wrestling championship created and promoted by 4th Rope Wrestling.

== Title history ==
Key
No.	Overall reign number
Reign	Reign number for the specific champion
Days	Number of days held
+	Current reign is changing daily

No.	Champion	Championship change			Reign statistics		Notes	Ref.
No.	Champion	Date	Event	Location	Reign	Days	Notes	Ref.
1	Zilla Fatu	November 2, 2024	Heels Have Eyes III: Steel Praying	Chicago, Illinois	1	740	Defeated Moose to become the inaugural champion.	
2	Joe Alonzo	November 12, 2026	Heelmatic	New York City, New York	1	<1	Awarded the vacant championship by Commissioner MVP.	
3	Bobby Lashley	November 12, 2026	Heelmatic	New York City, New York	1	3+	Defeated Joe Alonzo later that night.	
