= Slammiversary (2025) =

2025 TNA Wrestling event

- Promotional poster
- Promotion: Total Nonstop Action Wrestling
- Date: July 20, 2025
- City: Elmont, New York
- Venue: UBS Arena
- Attendance: 7,623

Pay-per-view chronology
← Previous; Rebellion	Next → Bound for Glory

Slammiversary chronology
← Previous; 2024	Next → 2026

The 2025 Slammiversary was a professional wrestling pay-per-view (PPV) event produced by Total Nonstop Action Wrestling (TNA) that took place on July 20, 2025, at the UBS Arena in Elmont, New York. It was the 21st event under the Slammiversary chronology, and celebrated the promotion's 23rd anniversary. Wrestlers from WWE's NXT brand also appeared on the card as part of the partnership between the two promotions along with wrestlers representing 4th Rope Wrestling.

Ten matches were contested at the event, including three on the pre-show. In the main event, Trick Williams defeated Joe Hendry and Mike Santana in a three-way match to retain the TNA World Championship. In other prominent matches, NXT's Jacy Jayne defeated TNA's Masha Slamovich in a Winner Takes All match to retain the NXT Women's Championship and win the TNA Knockouts World Championship, Leon Slater defeated Moose to win the TNA X Division Championship, and The Hardys (Jeff Hardy and Matt Hardy) defeated previous champions The Nemeths (Nic Nemeth and Ryan Nemeth), The Rascalz (Myron Reed and Zachary Wentz), and Fir$t Cla$$ (A. J. Francis and KC Navarro) in a four-way tag team ladder match to win the TNA World Tag Team Championship. The event also featured appearances by TNA Hall of Famer Bully Ray, and TNA legend and WWE Hall of famer AJ Styles.

== Production ==
=== Background ===
Slammiversary is a professional wrestling pay-per-view event produced by Total Nonstop Action Wrestling (TNA) to celebrate the anniversary of the company's first event, which was held on June 19, 2002. As such, the event is usually held in the summer (June or July). The first event took place nearly a year after that event on June 18, 2003, and has since been considered one of Impact's premiere PPV events, along with Bound for Glory and – since 2020 – Hard To Kill, and Rebellion.

On December 4, 2024, it was announced by TNA that Slammiversary would take place on July 20, 2025, at the UBS Arena in Elmont, New York.

=== Storylines ===
The event featured professional wrestling matches that involved different wrestlers from pre-existing scripted feuds and storylines. Wrestlers portrayed villains, heroes, or less distinguishable characters in scripted events that built tension and culminated in a wrestling match or series of matches. Storylines are produced on TNA's weekly television program Impact!

At NXT Battleground, Trick Williams defeated Joe Hendry to win the TNA World Championship, marking not only the first time a TNA championship changed hands on a WWE-produced event, but the first time a WWE-contracted wrestler held a TNA championship. Since then, Williams disparaged the legacy of TNA and had vowed to mold the company into his vision, calling it "TrickNA," while making limited appearances. He'd also defend the world title against challengers from both TNA and NXT on NXT television, such as Mike Santana and Josh Briggs. However, following the latter defense, Williams was ambushed by Hendry and sent running. Two days later on the June 26 episode of TNA Impact!, Hendry was delivering a promo to the crowd before being interrupted by TNA Director of Authority Santino Marella, who informed Hendry that he would be granted his rematch for the TNA World Championship against Williams at Slammiversary. However, later that night, Santana, after defeating A. J. Francis in a street fight, demanded that he be added to the match, given how in his previous attempt on NXT, Fir$t Cla$$ (Francis and KC Navarro) had gotten involved. Marella would announce via social media four days later that Santana would be in the world title match at Slammiversary, officially making it a three-way match.

At Against All Odds, Leon Slater, The Hardys (Jeff Hardy and Matt Hardy), and The Home Town Man faced The System (Brian Myers, Eddie Edwards, JDC, and TNA X Division Champion Moose) in an eight-man tag team match. The former team would ultimately secure the win, with the finish seeing Slater pin Moose, putting him in contention for the X Division title. As such, on the subsequent episode of TNA Impact!, Santino Marella announced that Moose would defend the title against Slater at Slammiversary.

After losing to Mike Santana in a Falls Count Anywhere match at Rebellion, Mustafa Ali began a downward spiral where he became more aggressive in matches – some not even involving him – while also being verbally and even physically abusive to his cabinet Order 4 (Tasha Steelz and The Great Hands (John Skyler and Jason Hotch)). In the meantime, Steelz had been calling an unknown person who could potentially straighten Ali out. The tension within the stable led to a match between Ali and Hotch at Against All Odds, which Ali won fiercely. Afterwards, Ali confronted Skyler for trying to protect Hotch, and when he tried to offer respect to Hotch, he refused and walked away. When a summit on the June 26 episode of TNA Impact! failed to resolve things, Ali would face Skyler in a "Call to Arms" match the following week, where both men started the match with one hand tied to the ropes. Both would use scissors to free themselves, but Ali ultimately ended up the victor. However, still incensed with his cabinet's insubordination, Ali prepared to strike Skyler with a steel chair before being confronted by old rival Cedric Alexander. The following week, Alexander and Ali met in the ring, the former confirming that Steelz called him to talk sense into Ali due to his past behavior. Ali refuted the offer, jealous of Alexander's success at his expense and for overshadowing him in their past rivalry. Ali would then challenge Alexander to a match at Slammiversary, which Alexander soon accepted.

On the Countdown to Against All Odds pre-show, The IInspiration (Cassie Lee and Jessica McKay) made their return to TNA after three years, confronting TNA Knockouts World Tag Team Champions The Elegance Brand (Ash by Elegance, Heather by Elegance, and M by Elegance) after their match while making their title intentions clear. After a few weeks of scouting each other, the two teams would take part in a battle royal for a future TNA Knockouts World Championship match. All members of both teams seemed to have been eliminated by most of the field, but Ash had rolled under the ropes during the scuffle, meaning she wasn't eliminated. Hiding away for most of the match, Ash would go on to win after eliminating Indi Hartwell and Tessa Blanchard simultaneously. Tensions between The Elegance Brand and The IInspiration continued as following the show, per social media, the former team was seen disrupting a meet and greet session for the latter before a brief altercation occurred. On the following week's episode, TNA announced that The IInspiration will challenge Ash and Heather by Elegance for the TNA Knockouts World Tag Team Championship at Slammiversary.

Following Ash by Elegance's victory in the battle royal that earned her a TNA Knockouts World Championship match, she was confronted by champion Masha Slamovich, only for the both of them to be upstaged by NXT Women's Champion Jacy Jayne. The following week on July 3, after Slamovich retained her title against Killer Kelly in a chain match, she would be ambushed by NXT's Fatal Influence (Jayne, Fallon Henley, and Jazmyn Nyx). Later in the show, Santino Marella and his daughter, TNA-NXT liaison Arianna Grace, announced a Winner Takes All match for both the TNA Knockouts World Championship and the NXT Women's Championship to take place at Slammiversary. With Jayne retaining her title at WWE Evolution, this confirmed that Jayne would face Slamovich at Slammiversary.

On July 10, a vignette aired during TNA Impact! paid for by Westside Gunn and Smoke DZA's 4th Rope Wrestling. The vignette featured 4th Rope Flyweight Champion Real1 (formerly Enzo Amore in WWE) discussing the possibility of showing up at Slammiversary, due to it taking place in his home region of the Tri-State area. This was confirmed the following week in another 4th Rope vignette, as Real1 declared he would also bring with him 4th Rope Heavyweight Champion Zilla Fatu and a "bishop" to the event. A promo from TNA International Champion Steve Maclin soon followed, who declared he would fight any wrestler from any company who came to TNA. TNA would then announce that Maclin would team with Jake Something and Mance Warner to take on Real1, Fatu, and Josh Bishop in a six-man tag team match on the Countdown to Slammiversary pre-show.

NXT faction DarkState (Dion Lennox, Osiris Griffin, Saquon Shugars, and Cutler James) made their debut in TNA on the July 3 episode of TNA Impact!, attacking Matt Cardona following his match with Eddie Edwards; Cardona had beaten Edwards due to unintentional interference from Eddie's System stablemate and Cardona's longtime friend Brian Myers. The following week, Cardona came to The System for assistance against DarkState, but was laughed off by most of the group while Myers looked hesitant. Then, on the July 15 episode of NXT, DarkState faced Joe Hendry, Mike Santana, and Trick Williams in a six-man tag team match, which ended up being thrown out after The System (Myers, Edwards, and JDC) emerged to attack the former. Two days later on TNA Impact!, it was confirmed that Cardona would join forces with The System in an eight-man tag team match against DarkState at Slammiversary.

On July 15, TNA President Carlos Silva wrote on X that more seats would be accommodated for Slammiversary, while emphasizing that it would be a "phenomenal" night in TNA history. Two days later, towards the end of TNA Impact!, a teaser played featuring clips of AJ Styles in TNA, along with a trunk containing Styles' gear, before a Slammiversary banner was shown at the end. TNA would ultimately confirm the next day that Styles, who was currently wrestling for WWE, would return to TNA at Slammiversary, marking over a decade since his last appearance for the company.

== Reception ==
The show received generally mixed-to-positive reviews, however, the TNA World Championship main event received overwhelmingly negative criticism. Jason Powell of Pro Wrestling Dot Net criticized the finish to the main event, stating "what a lousy way to end a mostly enjoyable pay-per-view". Kristian Thompson of TJR Wrestling rated the show a 7.25/10, stating that "It was solid wrestling all night long from TNA, but if you're a TNA fan who watches week-in and week-out, who believed the hype that this was going to be their best show ever, you are probably feeling a little underwhelmed after Slammiversary. NXT having both major TNA World Championships blows and I hate it. The biggest TNA show in North America of all time, with two face challengers (Hendry and Santana), one being from New York and having an NXT outsider (Williams) hold the title and the keep the title on the NXT wrestler? I rarely get angry about wrestling results but this is rolling over, even for TNA's standards." Graham Matthews of WrestleRant stated "The finish to the main event was flat and terribly executed. Williams retaining was bad enough, but the way they went about it made for an extremely underwhelming ending. Typical TNA for dropping the ball. A casual viewer of TNA may have enjoyed this event more than I did, and while I did think it was ultimately a good pay-per-view, they've had far better installments of Slammiversary, even in the last few years." Squish of AllYourWrestling.com gave the overall show a 7/10, again criticizing the main event saying "The ending most certainly shocked me. This was TNA's biggest ever show in the USA, this was TNA's chance to use this massive show to begin a new era and instead we got this?. This match sums up the whole PPV, not bad but disappointing" Andrew Sinclair of Voices of Wrestling stated that "On TNA's biggest-ever North American show, the well-built title win for the hometown hero was stolen by the heel from another promotion. Aside from the X-Division title match and the chaos of the Tag Title match, nothing on this show was good. In the two big WWE vs. TNA title matches, TNA got completely and utterly punked out and emasculated. Slammiversary was “the most TNA thing” I've seen, and that's not a compliment."

== Results ==
No.	Results	Stipulations	Times
1^{P}	The Elegance Brand (Ash by Elegance and Heather by Elegance) (c) (with M by Elegance and The Personal Concierge) defeated The IInspiration (Cassie Lee and Jessica McKay) by pinfall	Tag team match for the TNA Knockouts World Tag Team Championship	8:30
2^{P}	The Home Town Man defeated Eric Young (with Judas Icarus and Travis Williams) by pinfall	Singles match	4:10
3^{P}	Ropebreakers (Real1, Zilla Fatu, and Josh Bishop) defeated Steve Maclin, Jake Something, and Mance Warner (with Steph De Lander) by pinfall	Six-man tag team match	3:00
4	Mustafa Ali (with Jason Hotch, John Skyler, and Tasha Steelz) defeated Cedric Alexander by pinfall	Singles match	14:30
5	Matt Cardona and The System (Brian Myers, Eddie Edwards, and JDC) (with Alisha Edwards) defeated DarkState (Dion Lennox, Osiris Griffin, Saquon Shugars, and Cutler James) by pinfall	Eight-man tag team match	6:45
6	Indi Hartwell defeated Tessa Blanchard (with Victoria Crawford) by pinfall	Singles match	15:30
7	Jacy Jayne (NXT) (with Fallon Henley and Jazmyn Nyx) defeated Masha Slamovich (TNA) by pinfall	Winner Takes All match for the TNA Knockouts World Championship and the NXT Women's Championship	12:45
8	Leon Slater defeated Moose (c) by pinfall	Singles match for the TNA X Division Championship	15:34
9	The Hardys (Jeff Hardy and Matt Hardy) defeated The Nemeths (Nic Nemeth and Ryan Nemeth) (c), The Rascalz (Myron Reed (Note: Zachary Wentz was originally supposed to team with Trey Miguel, but due to a hernia, Myron Reed took his place.) and Zachary Wentz) and First Class (A. J. Francis and KC Navarro)	Four-way tag team ladder match for TNA World Tag Team Championship	17:30
10	Trick Williams (c) defeated Joe Hendry and Mike Santana by pinfall	Three-way match for the TNA World Championship	13:15
(c) / – the champion(s) heading into the match; P / – the match was broadcast on the pre-show
