= Zilla Fatu =

American professional wrestler

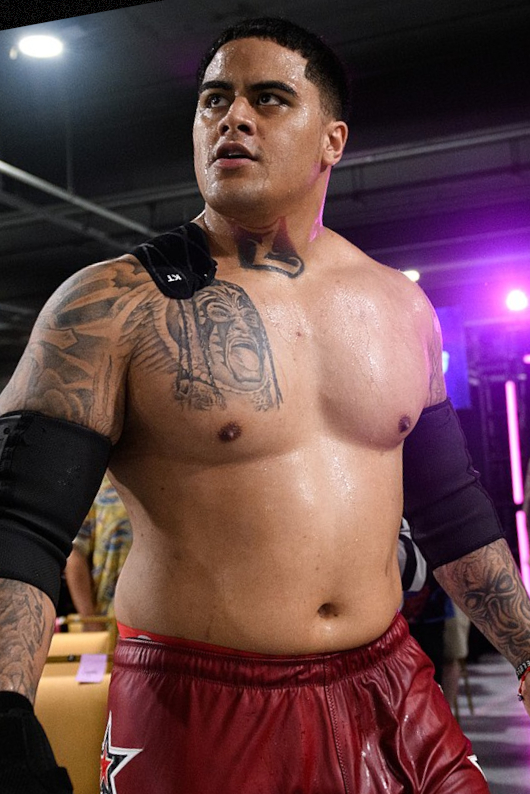
- Fatu in 2024

Personal information
- Born: Isayah Fatu; September 9, 1999 (age 27) Houston, Texas, U.S.
- Children: 1
- Father: Umaga
- Family: Anoaʻi

Professional wrestling career
- Ring name: Zilla Fatu
- Billed height: 6 ft 2 in (188 cm)
- Billed weight: 250 lb (113 kg)
- Billed from: Houston, Texas
- Trained by: Booker T Reality of Wrestling
- Debut: July 15, 2023

Isayah Fatu (born September 9, 1999), better known by his ring name Zilla Fatu, is an American professional wrestler. As of August 2026, he is signed to WWE, where he performs on the NXT brand.

Fatu is a third-generation wrestler, being the son of Umaga, and great nephew of The Wild Samoans (Afa and Sika) connecting him to the Anoaʻi family of Samoan professional wrestlers.

== Professional wrestling career ==
=== Early career (2023–2026) ===
Mainly trained by Booker T, Fatu made his professional wrestling debut in Reality of Wrestling at a house show from July 15, 2023, where he defeated Jonny Lyons in singles competition. Fatu left the promotion three months later, with Booker citing irreconcilable differences. At ROW Summer Of Champions X on August 10, 2024, Fatu defeated Edge Stone to win the ROW Championship, the promotion's top title.

He also worked for Game Changer Wrestling (GCW) appearing at Joey Janela's Spring Break: Clusterfuck Forever on April 6, 2024 in a four-way tag team match for the GCW Tag Team Championship and House of Glory (HOG), where he won the HOG Crown Jewel Championship. In August 2025, Fatu lost the HOG Crown Jewel Championship to Bully Ray in a tables match, but regained it one month later. On September 20, GCW announced that Fatu will not be appearing at GCW events for the foreseeable future. He also worked during Total Nonstop Action Wrestling's Slammiversary 2025 pre-show. In February 2026, Fatu also wrestled for the AEW World Championship at HOG's No Turning Back, but was defeated by MJF. Fatu wrestled his final match on the independent scene on August 7, where lost the HOG Crown Jewel Championship to the Amazing Red.

=== WWE (2026–present) ===
On the August 11, 2026 episode of NXT, Fatu made his WWE debut, attacking Cruz Montana and Grayson Waller during a No. 1 Contender's match for the NXT Championship with the winner to face Tony D'Angelo at NXT Heatwave on August 30, resulting in the match ending in a no contest, therefore establishing Fatu as a tweener. As a result, the NXT Championship match at NXT Heatwave became a fatal four-way match consisting of Fatu, Waller, Montana and D'Angelo, which was then won by Waller.

== Personal life ==
Fatu is a third-generation professional wrestler and a member of the Anoaʻi family. He is the son of Edward Smith Fatu who competed under the ring name of Umaga in WWE.

At the age of 15, Fatu was charged with aggravated robbery and spent six years at the Texas State Penitentiary, before being released in March 2020. After his release, he would work his way into professional wrestling, with guidance from Booker T.

Fatu converted to Islam in 2022.

His son Eki Leo Fatu was born on March 30, 2025.

== Championships and accomplishments ==
- 4th Rope Wrestling
  - 4th Rope Heavyweight Championship (1 time, inaugural)
- Gremlin House Wrestling
  - GHW World Tag Team Championship (1 time, inaugural) – with BG Wayne
- House of Glory
  - HOG Crown Jewel Championship (2 times)
- Noble Champions Group
  - NCG World Heavyweight Championship (1 time)
  - NCG Noble Crown Championship (1 time)
- Pro Wrestling Illustrated
  - Ranked No. 194 of the top 500 singles wrestlers in the PWI 500 in 2025
- Reality of Wrestling
  - ROW Heavyweight Championship (2 times)
