= UIC Dorin Forum =

- Interactive map of UIC Dorin Forum
- Former names: UIC Forum
- Address: 725 West Roosevelt Road
- Location: Chicago, Illinois
- Coordinates: 41.8669531°N 87.6458511°W
- Owner: University of Illinois Chicago
- Capacity: 3,000 (main hall)
- Type: Multipurpose event venue

Construction
- Built: 2007
- Opened: February 2008
- Architect: HOK

Website
- forum.uic.edu

The UIC Dorin Forum is a multipurpose event venue on the campus of the University of Illinois Chicago. Built in 2007 and opened in February 2008, its main hall can accommodate 3,000 people.

== History ==
The venue was originally named the UIC Forum. Its flexible main hall can be divided into three smaller event spaces using movable partitions; HOK was the project's architect.

In 2017, the University of Illinois Board of Trustees approved renaming the venue for Isadore and Sadie Dorin after their family's foundation pledged $3 million to the university. The pledge secured a 17-year naming term, with $2 million designated for university priorities and $1 million for an endowed scholarship. UIC held a ribbon-cutting ceremony for the renamed Isadore and Sadie Dorin Forum on April 22, 2018.

== Events and uses ==
In January 2012, President Barack Obama held a campaign rally and concert at the Forum. On November 20, 2013, Governor Pat Quinn signed legislation legalizing same-sex marriage in Illinois at the venue before a crowd of more than 2,000.

The Forum hosted all home meets of the UIC Flames women's gymnastics team during its final 2019 season, as well as selected men's gymnastics meets. Beginning in August 2020, it also served as a site for UIC's saliva-based COVID-19 testing program.
