= Al Katrazz =

American professional wrestler (born 1971)

Personal information
- Born: Brian Fleming; October 8, 1971 (age 55) Vista, California, U.S.

Professional wrestling career
- Ring name(s): Al Fleming; Al Katrazz; Alkatrazz; Trazz; Jason Alcatraz
- Billed height: 6 ft 3 in (1.91 m)
- Billed weight: 240 lb (110 kg)
- Trained by: Cory Van Kleeck; Tom Howard
- Debut: 1997
- Retired: 2014

Brian Fleming (born October 8, 1971) is an American professional wrestler. He is best known by his ring name Al Katrazz, a word play on the name of Alcatraz Prison and a reference to Fleming's gimmick of a convict. Also known for being in World Wrestling Entertainment (WWE) video games as a talent. Players can sign as a free agent in General Manager mode within the games.

== Professional wrestling career ==
=== Ultimate Pro Wrestling (2000–2007) ===
After completing his training, Fleming debuted in Ultimate Pro Wrestling (UPW) in a tag team match with Basil in a losing effort to Mike Knox and Samoa Joe at the event Proving Ground on December 12, 2000. Katrazz and Basil, now renamed to Bad Boy Basil, soon became a regular tag team, calling themselves the Definition of Pain, and on February 2, 2001, they were eliminated in a tournament for the vacant the Tag Team title at Warzone after losing to The Ballard Brothers (Shane and Shannon).

On June 26 at Control, Katrazz wrestled his first singles match, which he lost to Adam Pearce. At Unfinished Business on August 22, he lost to Keiji Sakoda. After three victories in a row, Katrazz challenged the Heavyweight Champion Mikey Henderson for the title at Season's Beatings on December 19, but failed to win.

On May 5, 2002, Al Katrazz and Hardkore Kidd started a short feud, which saw Katrazz lose a Falls Count Anywhere match at Gold Rush. The feud culminated after a match at Home Of The Brave II, which Kidd also won. On January 8, 2003, Katrazz and Kidd formed a tag team known as Hardkore Inc., and began pursuing the Tag Team Championship. The team lost to The Ballard Brothers in a title match at Rage On The River: Unleashed on April 19 at the Edgewater Event Center in Laughlin, Nevada. However, they defeated The Ballard Brothers for the championship on April 25 in a tables match at Entertainment Overload. After several title defenses, Hardkore, Inc. lost the title back to The Ballard Brothers at Overload on February 20, 2004, in a Tables, Ladders, and Chairs match.

Katrazz left UPW in 2006 in order to participate in the tapings for Wrestling Society X, and he wrestled his last match for UPW on January 1, 2007, which he lost to Human Tornado at the O.C. Dojo event.

=== Alternative Wrestling Show (2003–2007) ===
Katrazz, debuted in the Alternative Wrestling Show on May 31, 2003, in a six-man tag team match, where he reunited with Hardkore Kidd and teamed with Adam Pearce to defeat Babi Slymm, Disco Machine, and Super Dragon. Over the following months, Katrazz was victorious over the likes of Slymm, Dragon, Kenny King, Disco Machine, and Excalibur.

On May 1, 2004, he and Hardkore Kidd reformed Hardkore Inc. and won the Tag Team Championship by defeating Lil Cholo and Scorpio Sky. After Kidd left the ASW, Katrazz selected Adam Pearce as his new tag team partner and they successfully retained the title against Joey Ryan and Scott Lost on May 29. Katrazz then picked Skulu as his second replacement partner, and together they retained the title two months later against Black Metal and King Jakal. At A Major Styles Clash on September 25, Katrazz and Skulu lost the title to Misterioso and Super Boy.

In 2005, Katrazz attempted to reclaim the Tag Team Title with Davey Richards, first unsuccessfully challenging Los Chivos (Enigma de Oro and Kayam) on June 18. They were again unsuccessful after Los Chivos retained their title in a four-way tag team match on July 30 that also involved the teams of Junior and Phoenix Star and Ronin and Top Gun Talwar.

After losing to the Heavyweight Champion Human Tornado at Turkey Sandwich on November 26 via disqualification, he captured the championship on May 20, 2006, at Mayhem: A Fight For The Belt. He won a 32-Man Bunkhouse Brawl at Bart's Bunkhouse Brawl on July 29 to retain the Heavyweight Title after lasting an hour and four minutes. After losing to Human Tornado via disqualification on September 30 at Prelude To A Slaughterhouse, the Heavyweight Title was vacated on October 1. From June 22 and July 27, 2007, Katrazz competed in a tournament for the vacant Heavyweight Championship. After defeating Enigma de Oro, Apollo Kahn and Peter Goodman in the previous rounds, he defeated former tag team partner Aaron Aguilera at Crowning A Champion to win his second Heavyweight Title. On November 4, he lost the championship to Lil Cholo in a No Disqualification Falls Count Anywhere match before leaving the promotion.

=== Pro Wrestling Guerrilla (2003–2004) ===
Katrazz joined Pro Wrestling Guerrilla in 2003 and reformed Hardkore Inc. alongside The Hardkore Kidd and new allies Adam Pearce and El Jefe. On July 26 at Debut Show, PWG's inaugural event Hardkore, Inc. defeated The X-Foundation (Funky Billy Kim, Joey Ryan and Scott Lost). On August 30 during the second day of the first annual Bad Ass Mother 3000 tournament, Katrazz and Kidd defeated Apollo Kahn and Hook Bomberry. In the first round of the first annual Tango & Cash Invitational, Katrazz and Kidd were eliminated by The Havana Pitbulls (Ricky Reyes and Rocky Romero) on January 24, 2004, in Santa Ana, California. The tournament was held to crown the inaugural Tag Team Champions, which was eventually won by The Strong Style Thugs (B-Boy and Homicide).

=== National Wrestling Alliance, Wrestling Society X and SoCal Pro Wrestling (2006–2008) ===
On January 21, 2006, Katrazz debuted in the National Wrestling Alliance (NWA), where he lost an elimination tag team match along with Adam Pearce, Crayz and The Plague to Aaron Aguilera, Babi Slymm, Human Tornado and Sexy Chino at The Super Bart Shuffle. At Pro Wrestling Summit on September 22 in the Orleans Arena of Las Vegas, Nevada, Katrazz reunited with Aguilera, but lost to Human Tornado and Konnan in a tag team match. Fleming began appearing sporadically for the NWA in 2007, due to concentrating on the Alternative Wrestling Show as well as taping episodes for Wrestling Society X.

In 2006, Fleming took part in the tapings for Wrestling Society X (WSX) under the ring name Alkatrazz. While in WSX, he formed a tag team with Luke Hawx. The most notable match he had in WSX was a Tables, Ladders & Cervesaz match, which he and Hawx won against Los Pochos Guapos (Aaron Aguilera and Kaos), which was taped on November 12. WSX folded shortly after its first season of tapings. In 2007, Fleming debuted in SoCal Pro Wrestling and on April 14, he took part in the promotion's debut event, SoCal - The Debut Event, where he lost to Jason Redondo. At SoCal Super Clash on September 15, Katrazz defeated NWA World Heavyweight Champion Adam Pearce via disqualification. Katrazz then lost to Redondo in a match for the vacant Heavyweight Championship at SoCal Pro 1 Year Anniversary on April 26, 2008.

In 2008, Fleming returned to the NWA and began appearing on their television show, Wrestling Showcase, where he competed as an enhancement talent to other wrestlers in singles and tag team competition.

=== Hiatus and return (2012) ===
After a four-year-long hiatus, Katrazz returned to professional wrestling July 6, 2012 at United Forces 4, a cross-promotional event between Alternative Wrestling Show and Empire Wrestling Federation, where he defeated Johnny Goodtime to win the AWS Heavyweight Championship for the third time. The following night at AWS' Ten Year Anniversary event, Katrazz lost the Heavyweight Title to Extreme Loco in a three-way match also involving Biggie Biggz.

== Championships and accomplishments ==
- Alternative Wrestling Show
  - AWS Heavyweight Championship (3 times)
  - AWS Tag Team Championship (1 time)^{1} – with Hardkore Kidd and Skulu
- California Championship Wrestling
  - CCW Heavyweight Championship (5 times)
  - CCW Tag Team Championship (2 times) – with B-Boy
- Golden State Championship Wrestling
  - GSCW Heavyweight Championship (1 time)
- Ultimate Pro Wrestling
  - UPW Tag Team Championship (1 time) – with Hardkore Kidd
- United Independent Wrestling Alliance
  - UIWA Heavyweight Championship (1 time)
- World Class Wrestling Alliance
  - WCWA Heavyweight Championship (1 time)

^{1}After Hardkore Kidd left the Alternative Wrestling Show, Katrazz defended the championship with Adam Pearce and then Skulu.
