= Tom Howard (wrestler) =

American professional wrestler

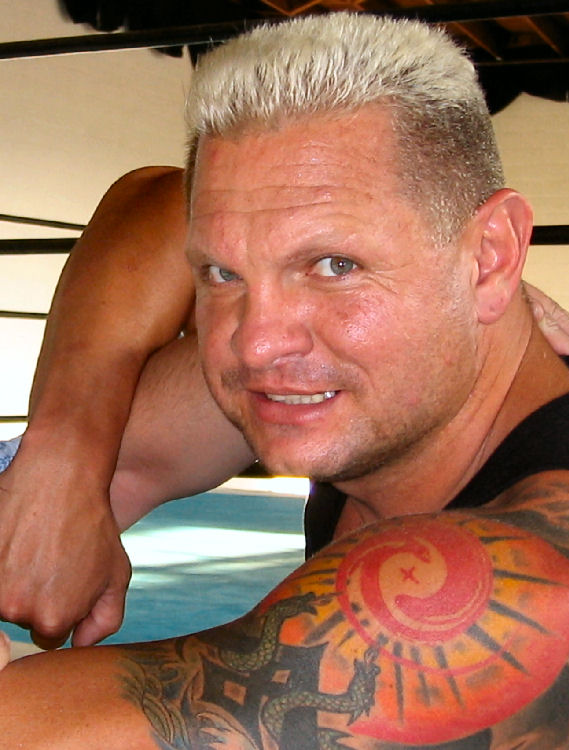

Personal information
- Born: Thomas Merrett Howard; December 26, 1969 (age 56) Salt Lake City, Utah, U.S.

Professional wrestling career
- Ring name(s): Zuma; KGB; The Big Time; Green Beret; Tom Howard
- Billed height: 6 ft 4 in (193 cm)
- Billed weight: 255 lb (116 kg)
- Trained by: Jesse Hernandez; Bill Anderson
- Debut: 1994
- Retired: 2006

Thomas Merrett Howard (born December 26, 1969) is an American professional wrestler, and actor. He is best known for his Green Beret role in K-1 and Pro Wrestling ZERO1-MAX in Japan. As a veteran competitor and instructor, Howard has worked for World Wrestling Federation (wrestler-instructor), World Championship Wrestling (wrestler), Pro Wrestling Zero-One (wrestler-instructor), Universal Fighting-Arts Organization (wrestler-instructor), K-1 (fighter – MMA, kickboxing), Cage Rage (fighter), IFL (fighter), All Japan Pro Wrestling (wrestler), Pro Wrestling Noah (wrestler), Inoki Genome Federation (wrestler), HUSTLE (wrestler), Asistencia Asesoria y Administracion (wrestler) and Ultimate Pro Wrestling (wrestler-instructor).

In 2006, Howard retired from competition and began working in the entertainment industry (film, television and commercial). He has numerous US and International credits as an actor, stuntman, producer, technical producer, action coordinator, and fight scene choreographer. Howard is also co-owner of The Fight Pros, a company specializing in providing consulting, casting and production for the Film/TV & Commercial industries, and Rebirth Productions, a production company specializing in creating and developing unscripted television properties.

== Career ==
=== Professional wrestling ===
In 1993, Tom Howard began training under Jesse Hernandez and Bill Anderson in professional wrestling, lucha libre and puroresu at the School of Hard Knocks wrestling training school. His first match was against Bobby Bradley Jr. at the Silver Nugget Casino in October 1994. In early 1995, Howard began appearing on NWC (National Wrestling Conference) Television in Las Vegas and quickly became popular wrestling under the name 'Zuma, a surfer gimmick from Zuma Beach, California. He went on to wrestle as "KGB", under a KGB agent gimmick.

In 1995, Howard was recruited to wrestle on television in Mexico where he quickly became popular wrestling for Asistencia Asesoría y Administración as KGB, using the same gimmick. Howard lived in Mexico City and appeared on AAA's television show for 2 years. In 1996, Howard returned to the United States to compete in Antonio Inoki's World Wrestling Peace Festival in Los Angeles. While in Los Angeles, Howard took a break from wrestling to train in Sambo with Gokor Chivichyan & Gene Lebell for No Holds Barred competition.

In late 1996, Howard and Rick Bassman formed Ultimate Pro Wrestling. Tom acted as the head instructor for the school, Ultimate University and also began competing in the ring regularly for UPW. He went under his real name and adopted the gimmick of a Green Berets drill instructor. Tom's former students include World Wrestling Entertainment wrestlers such as John Cena, Victoria, Chris Masters, Aaron Aguilera, Luther Reigns, Sakoda, Heidenreich, Nathan Jones and Sylvester Terkay. In 1998, Howard signed a developmental contract with the World Wrestling Federation. Tom's time was split as an instructor for the UPW and on the road performing in dark matches across the country.

On June 26, 2001 Howard pinned Tony Jones to capture the Southern California title. On August 22, Howard became UPW's Shoot Champion when the Southern California title was renamed.

Howard competed against Shinya Hashimoto for a Pro Wrestling Zero-One Fighting Athletes PPV – Shingeki I in Japan and was signed to a contract with the company. On August 30 – Shingeki II, Tom Howard knocked out Lee Young Gun in Tokyo, Japan. On May 8, 2002 Howard defeated Christopher Daniels to unify the UPW and Shoot titles in Santa Ana, California. Then on July 7 Howard & Nathan Jones defeated Steve Corino & Rapid Fire Maldon at Sumo Hall in Japan on a Zero-One pay-per-view. On December 15, Howard & Matt Ghaffari beat Shinya Hashimoto & Naoya Ogawa to win the NWA Intercontinental Tag Team Championship on a Zero One PPV.

On July 13, 2001, Tom Howard and Sean McCully defeated Yuki Ishikawa and Yoshiaki Fujiwara when Howard used No. 42 on Fujiwara. On May 19, 2002 Shinya Hashimoto, Naoya Ogawa and Yoshiaki Fujiwara defeated Tom Howard, The Predator and Steve Corino. On May 23, Tom Howard and The Predator defeated Emblem (Shinjiro Ohtani and Masato Tanaka). On June 27, Tom Howard, The Predator and Nathan Jones defeated Shinya Hashimoto and Emblem. On June 29, Tom Howard and The Predator defeated Shinya Hashimoto and Kohei Sato. On June 30, Shinya Hashimoto and Masato Tanaka defeated The Predatora and Tom Howard. On July 28, Tom Howard, The Predator and C. W. Anderson defeated Shinya Hashimoto, Tatsuhito Takaiwa and Masato Tanaka. On 7/30/02 Tom Howard and The Predator defeated Shinya Hashimoto and Yoshiaki Fujiwara. On July 31, Shinya Hashimoto, Kazuhiko Ogasawara and Ryouji Sai defeated Tom Howard, The Predator and Samoa Joe. On August 2, 2002, Shinya Hashimoto, Yoshiaki Fujiwara and Tatsuhito Takaiwa defeated The Predator, Tom Howard and C. W. Anderson.

On March 2, 2003 Zero-One True Century Creation II, Tom Howard & Samoa Joe defeated Gary Steele & Steve Corino. On March 9, Emblem (Shinjiro Ohtani and Masato Tanaka) defeated Tom Howard/King Adamo for the PWF Tag Team Title. On April 11, 2003 Tom Howard & Steve Corino beat Mitsuharu Misawa & Tsuyoshi Kikuchi (11:33) when Howard used the No. 55 on Kikuchi. On April 13, 2003 Jun Akiyama & Akitoshi Saito beat Tom Howard & Steve Corino (11:06) when Akiyama used an Exploder on Corino. October 22 Howard defeated Adam Pearce to regain the UPW Heavyweight Championship title in Santa Ana, California. On January 4, 2004 in HUSTLE, Mil Máscaras & Dos Caras & Sicodelico Jr. defeated Howard & Steve Corino & Dusty Rhodes. On January 31, Tom Howard defeated Prince Nana in Tokyo. On February 20, at the UPW 5th Anniversary Show, Howard & Christopher Daniels defeated Scott Hall & Kevin Nash. On February 29, Kohei Sato and Hirotaka Yokoi defeated Tom Howard and Zebra Man. On July 9, Tom Howard defeated Steve Corino, Jason The Legend and Psycho Simpson in a cage match. Then on October 30, Howard defeated Oliver John to retain the UPW Heavyweight title. On February 23, 2005 Howard & The Predator defeated Sean O'Haire & Chuck Palumbo. Finally, on July 20, Howard defeated Matt "Horshu" Weise to retain the UPW Heavyweight title.

Tom "Green Beret" Howard has also been featured in several video games in the US and Japan such as Fire Pro Wrestling, King of Coliseum and King of Coliseum 1 & 2.

=== Kickboxing and mixed martial arts ===
In 2003, Tom Howard signed a 2-year fight contract with Japanese kickboxing and mixed martial arts promotion, K-1.

When asked about making the transition from Japanese Puroresu (Pro Wrestling) to K1 MMA and Kickboxing Howard was quoted in Maxfighting.com as saying: "Jumping into this sport so late, I have been playing the catch up game since I started. My philosophy is to train my hardest, do my best and be happy with the outcome. I am not afraid of getting hurt and will fight anyone that they want to put in front of me at any time. I am not saying that to sound like a tough guy but the reality is that they (the K1 office) use their infinite wisdom to do their job in booking the fights and I need to do my job." When asked in the same article about how he got into wrestling and fighting in Japan, Howard explained: "I was doing pro wrestling in Japan on television for several years with a promotion called Zero-One – The back story to this explains my introduction to K1: Zero One was an offshoot company of New Japan Pro Wrestling established by Shinya Hashimoto. Hashimoto was looking for a new Gaijin (foreign) wrestler to introduce, so I was brought over to wrestle him on a big pay per view called Shingeki. This was when Japanese Pro Wrestling was mimicking MMA so we wore MMA gloves and the matches had MMA rules. I guess the match was highly regarded because we made the covers of the wrestling magazines and even mainstream sports papers. After that I started to get a following in Japan and spent the next several years going back and forth between Japan and the USA for monthly tours. At the end of one of my annual contracts I received word from my manager and friend Rick Bassman that K1 was interested in signing me to a multi year/fight deal and everything just worked out from there. As I said before, I was a huge fan of K1 and had been following it heavily with all of the time I was spending in Japan."

He made his K1 MMA debut against France's Kristof Midoux on New Year's Eve at K-1 PREMIUM 2003 Dynamite!!. He then fought Mongolian Wrestling champion Dolgorsürengiin Serjbüdee (aka "Blue Wolf") at K-1 MMA ROMANEX in May 2004. This bout was particularly brutal with Howard being kneed in the head and face a total of 46 times. It was after this fight that K1 changed their MMA rules to make throwing knees to the head of a grounded opponent illegal. In his next K1 MMA fight, Howard fought against American kickboxer and K1 US Champion Carter Williams in Hawaii at Rumble on the Rock 6. This fight ended when Williams threw a fury of punches on the ground causing cuts that required Howard to receive a total of 36 stitches. In June 2005, Howard fought in Hiroshima, Japan on the K1 Grand Prixs show under kickboxing rules against 7' 2", 400 lb. South Korean Choi Hong-man. This fight was featured in K1's Best Knockouts as Choi caught Howard with a knee to the Head causing a 6" cut up his forehead and knocking him halfway across the ring. In August 2006, Tom Howard was recruited by the Antonio Inoki's Tokyo Sabres to fight in the International Fight League. His premier fight with the promotion came on September 6, 2006 against Krzysztof Soszynski. In February 2007, Howard competed in the Cage Rage Championships at Wembley Arena in London, England against Wolfslaire fighter Tom Blackledge. This fight ended quickly when Howard escaped from a takedown attempt and turned into a headkick by Blackledge causing a 5" cut which ended the fight and required 8 staples to close. In December 2007, Howard fought Eric "Butterbean" Esch in the main event of the World Cage Championship in Jasper, Alabama.

== Instructor or trainer ==
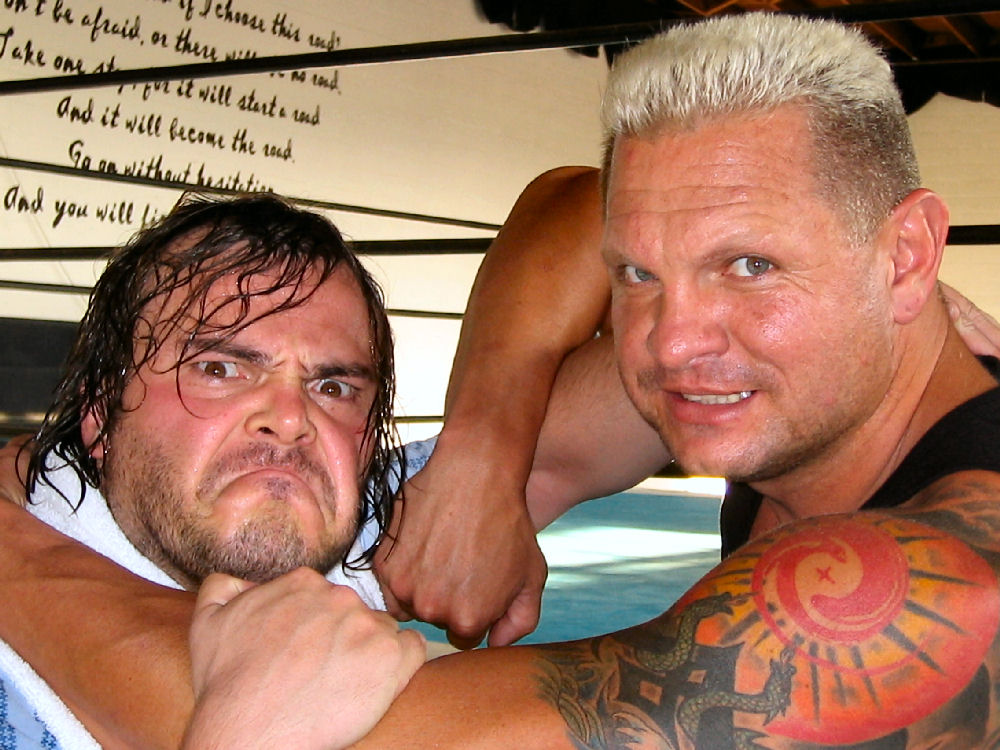
Tom Howard training Jack Black for the movie Nacho Libre

- Trained several pro athletes in kickboxing and conditioning such as Deron Williams of NBA's Utah Jazz and PGA Pro Golfer Hunter Mahan
- Trained DVD on TV hosts Dave Holmes and Jennifer Lothrop on camera for FX airing of the film "The Marine"
- Acted as Trainer, Instructor and Technical Producer for Hulk Hogan Celebrity Championship Wrestling
- Trained Actor Jack Black in Pro Wrestling / Lucha Libre for film Nacho Libre
- Hosted and Starred in series Ultimate Pro Wrestling Training, Volumes 1, 2 & 3 – Video/DVD (SPY Video)
- Head Instructor for Ultimate University / UPW – Development territory for WWE – Instructed wrestlers such as: John Cena, Victoria, Chris Masters, Jesus Aguilera, Luther Reigns, Sakoda, Heidenreich, Nathan Jones, The Miz, Brian Kendrick, Mike Knox, Frankie Kazarian, Paul London, Samoa Joe, B-Boy, Hollywood Yates ("Wolf" on American Gladiators), Mike O'Hearn ("Titan" on American Gladiators), Evan Marriott (Reality show "Joe Millionaire") and The Predator
- Co-hosted and Guest Starred: Ultimate Fighting Training series with Mark Kerr for Panther Video
- Instructor for UFO – Universal Fighting Organization – Japan (Television/Pay Per View)

== Producer ==
- FX's DVD on TV – "The Marine" 2009 – Technical Producer
- Hulk Hogan's Celebrity Championship Wrestling – 2008 – Technical Producer
- Ultimate Pro-Wrestling Training – Volume 1: Building a foundation – 2000 – Producer
- Ultimate Pro-Wrestling Training – Volume 2: The next step – 2000 – Producer
- Ultimate Pro-Wrestling Training – Volume 3: Building a match – 2000 – Producer
- Planned Parenthood – Commercial – 2000 – Producer

== Film and television ==
Howard has had various roles in film, television and other media.

=== Film ===
- Muy Thai Giant (2008)
- Sum Tum (2007) –
- Daredevil (2003)
- Blue Atomic (1999)
- True Vengeance (1997)
- JFK (1991)

=== Television ===
- The Good Guys (2010)
- Death Valley - "Pilot" (2010)
- FX's DVD on TV - "The Marine" (2009)
- Hulk Hogan's Celebrity Championship Wrestling (2008)
- Inoki's IGF - Japan (2008–2009)
- Cage Rage World Championship - England (2008)
- World Wrestling Allstars - South Africa (2008)
- K1 Grand Prix Hiroshima - Japan (2006)
- Samurai TV -Japan (2005–2006)
- Zero One Fighting Athletes -Japan (2004–2006)
- Pro Wrestling Noah - Japan (2006)
- Universal Fighting Organization (UFO)- Japan (2006)
- Faking It (2004)
- Bodyslam (2002)
- Los Luchadores (2001)
- Nikki (2001)
- Dismissed (2001)
- Inside: Pro Wrestling School (2000)
- The Drew Carey Show (1999)
- G vs E (1999)
- AAA Lucha Libre - Mexico (1997–1998)
- Sugar Ray Leonard's Fight Zone (1998)

=== Commercials ===
- World Wrestling Entertainment (World Series Commercial)
- Planned Parenthood

== Kickboxing record ==
Professional record breakdown
1 match	0 wins	1 loss
By knockout	0	1
By decision	0	0
Draws	0	

Res.	Record	Opponent	Method	Event	Date	Round	Time	Location	Notes
Loss	0–1	(South Korea) Choi Hong-man	KO (knee strike)	K-1 World Grand Prix 2005 in Hiroshima	June 14, 2005	1	2:11	Hiroshima, Japan	

== Mixed martial arts record ==
Professional record breakdown
8 matches	0 wins	8 losses
By knockout	0	4
By submission	0	4
By decision	0	0
Draws	0	

Res.	Record	Opponent	Method	Event	Date	Round	Time	Location	Notes
Loss	0–8	Butterbean	Submission (neck crank)	Extreme Cage Fighting	September 9, 2009	1	1:40	Laredo, Texas, United States	
Loss	0–7	Butterbean	Submission (armlock)	World Cage Championship	December 1, 2007	1	4:47	Jasper, Alabama, United States	
Loss	0–6	Tom Blackledge	KO (head kick)	Cage Rage 20	February 10, 2007	1	3:29	London, England	
Loss	0–5	Krzysztof Soszynski	TKO (punches)	International Fight League	September 9, 2006	1	3:47	Portland, Oregon, United States	
Loss	0–4	Christian Wellisch	Submission (rear-naked choke)	Valor Fighting: Showdown At Cache Creek	February 3, 2006	1	2:11	Brooks, California, United States	
Loss	0–3	Carter Williams	KO (punches)	Rumble on the Rock	November 20, 2004	1	2:16	Honolulu, Hawaii, United States	
Loss	0–2	Dolgorsürengiin Serjbüdee	TKO (knees)	K-1 MMA ROMANEX	May 22, 2004	2	4:44	Saitama, Japan	
Loss	0–1	Kristof Midoux	Submission (rear naked choke)	K-1 PREMIUM 2003 Dynamite!!	December 31, 2003	1	4:21	Nagoya, Japan	

== Championships and accomplishments ==
- Pro Wrestling ZERO1-MAX

- NWA Intercontinental Tag Team Championship (1 time) – with Matt Ghaffari

- Ultimate Pro Wrestling

- UPW Heavyweight Championship (2 times)
- UPW Southern California/Shoot Championship (1 time)
