= Ultimate Pro Wrestling =

California-based independent professional wrestling promotion

Ultimate Professional Wrestling
- Acronym: UPW
- Founded: 1998
- Defunct: 2007
- Headquarters: Santa Ana, California
- Founder: Rick Bassman
- Owner: Rick Bassman

Ultimate Professional Wrestling (UPW) was a California-based independent pro wrestling promotion and developmental territory owned and operated by Rick Bassman, that operated from 1998–2007.

The company had working relationships with Pro Wrestling Zero1 and World Wrestling Entertainment (WWE). It served as a developmental company for WWE, where they would scout wrestlers and send others for training, from 2006 to 2007. Some of the major names to go on to stardom are John Cena, Samoa Joe, The Miz, Christopher Daniels and Frankie Kazarian. The promotion was featured on a Discovery Channel special called Inside Professional Wrestling School.

== Notable alumni ==
Deceased individuals are indicated with a dagger (†).

- Melina Perez
- Rick Bassman
- B-Boy
- Mike Bell †
- The Blue Meanie
- Jack Bull
- Cheerleader Melissa
- Melissa Coates †
- Christopher Daniels
- Head Bitch in Charge (Victoria)
- Jon Heidenreich
- Horshu
- Tom Howard
- Ivory
- Tony Jones †
- Evan Karagias
- Al Katrazz
- Frankie Kazarian
- Mike Knox
- Paul London
- Scott Lost
- The Miz
- Michael Modest
- Donovan Morgan
- Chris Mordetzky
- Nova
- Human Tornado
- Navajo Warrior
- Shinjiro Otani
- Adam Pearce
- The Prototype (John Cena)
- Daniel Puder
- Tyler Reks
- Puma
- Quicksilver
- Ricky Reyes
- Davey Richards
- Rocky Romero
- Ruckus
- Joey Ryan
- Keiji Sakoda †
- Samoa Joe
- Scorpio Sky
- Skulu †
- Babi Slymm
- Bison Smith
- Spanky
- Solo Snuka
- Masato Tanaka
- Chase Tatum †
- Sylvester Terkay
- Brett Wagner
- Tommy Drake

Tag Teams:

- The Ballard Brothers (Shane and Shannon) and Cheerleader Melissa
- Los Cubanitos (Ricky Reyes and Rocky Romero)
- Evolution (Frankie Kazarian and Nova)
- Hardkore Inc. (Adam Pearce, Hardkore Kidd, and Al Katrazz)
- Team Emblem (Keiji Sakoda, Masato Tanaka, and Shinjiro Otani)

== Championships ==
- UPW Heavyweight Championship
- UPW Lightweight Championship
- UPW Tag Team Championship
- UPW Southern California/Shoot Championship
- UPW No Holds Barred Championship
- NWA/UPW/Zero1 International Junior Heavyweight Championship

== UPW Heavyweight Championship ==
The UPW Heavyweight Championship was a championship contested for by Heavyweight wrestlers in Ultimate Pro Wrestling.

Wrestler	#	Date	Location	Notes
Sylvester Terkay	1	February 1, 1999	Mission Viejo, California	Won a Battle royal to become first champion
Aaron Baker	1	1999	Santa Ana, California	
Mike Bell	2	November 1999	Santa Ana, California	
Vacant	N/A	January 9, 2000	N/A	Mike Bell was stripped of the title.
Bad Boy Basil	1	January 27, 2000	Santa Ana, California	Defeated J. D. Dempsey in a tournament final.
Smelly	1	March 29, 2000	Santa Ana, California	
The Prototype	1	April 27, 2000	San Diego, California	
Smelly	1	May 24, 2000	Santa Ana, California	
Staz	1	August 23, 2000	Santa Ana, California	
Christopher Daniels	1	October 12, 2000	Costa Mesa, California	
Samoa Joe	1	March 14, 2001	Santa Ana, California	
Mikey Henderson	1	November 27, 2001	Hollywood, California	
Vacant	N/A	November 27, 2001	N/A	stripped for no-show
Christopher Daniels	2	March 13, 2002	Santa Ana, California	Defeats Samoa Joe and Frankie Kazarian in a 3-way match.
Tom Howard	2	May 8, 2002	Santa Ana, California	Defeated Christopher Daniels in a tournament final, stripped of the title on June 3.
Vacant	N/A	June 3, 2002	N/A	
Adam Pearce	1	July 11, 2003	Anaheim, California	Defeated Chris Mordetzsky in a tournament final.
Tom Howard	1	October 22, 2003	Santa Ana, California	
Inactive	N/A	2007	N/A	

== UPW Lightweight Championship ==
The UPW Lightweight Championship was a championship contested for by Cruiserweight wrestlers in Ultimate Pro Wrestling.

Wrestler	#	Date	Location	Notes
Prodigy	1	January 27, 2000	Santa Ana, California	Won a Battle royal to become first champion
Rick Bassman	1	January 27, 2000	Santa Ana, California	Bassman [who was the company's owner] stole the title belt and named himself champion.
Prodigy	2	February 23, 2000	Santa Ana, California	
The Enterprise	1	March 15, 2000	Hollywood, California	Title might be vacant later in the month.
Savvy	1	March 28, 2000	Santa Ana, California	Won a Battle royal. Might have been for a vacant belt.
The Enterprise	2	March 29, 2000	San Diego, California	Won a Battle royal. Stripped of the title on May 24, 2000, for being over the title's weight limit.
Stretch	1	May 24, 2000	Santa Ana, California	Won a Battle royal for the vacant title.
B-Boy	1	June 2000	San Diego, California	
Stretch	2	June 10, 2000	Santa Ana, California	
Drunk Irishman	1	July 20, 2000	Huntington Beach, California	Later had to vacate the title due to injury.
Stretch	3	July 29, 2000	Huntington Beach, California	Won a tournament for the vacant title.
Mikey Henderson	1	August 23, 2000	Santa Ana, California	Vacates the title on October 12, 2000, to create the Ultimate Pro Wrestling Southern California title.
Prodigy	3	November 8, 2000	Santa Ana, California	Won a Battle royal for the vacant title
B-Boy	2	May 30, 2001	Santa Ana, California	
Frankie Kazarian	1	August 15, 2002	Santa Ana, California	This was a 2 out of 3 falls Triple Threat Match also involving Spanky. The first fall was for Spanky's Zero1 International Junior Heavyweight Championship and the second fall was for B-Boy's UPW Lightweight title.
Lil Nate	1	February 23, 2005	Santa Ana, California	

== UPW Tag Team Championship ==
The UPW Tag Team Championship was a secondary title contested for in Ultimate Pro Wrestling.

Tag Team	#	Date	Location	Notes
The Ballard Brothers (Shane & Shannon)	1	December 2, 1999	Hollywood, California	Won a Battle royal to become first champions.
Team Hardcore (Justin Sane & Hardkore Kidd)	1	March 2000	Santa Ana, California	
The Ballard Brothers (Shane & Shannon)	2	March 28, 2000	Santa Ana, California	
Jobbers-R-Us (Billy Kim & Troubled Youth)	1	April 19, 2000	Santa Ana, California	
Los Cubanitos (Ricky Reyes & Rocky Romero)	1	April 27, 2000	San Diego, California	
The Ballard Brothers (Shane & Shannon)	3	May 24, 2000	Santa Ana, California	
Team Hardcore (Justin Sane & Hardkore Kidd)	2	July 1, 2000	Huntington Beach, California	This was a phantom title change meaning it never actually took place.
The Ballard Brothers (Shane & Shannon)	4	July 15, 2000	Huntington Beach, California	Phantom title change. Stripped on January 31, 2001.
Evolution (Frankie Kazarian & Nova)	1	May 30, 2001	Santa Ana, California	Won a tournament for the vacant titles.
The Ballard Brothers (Shane & Shannon)	5	May 8, 2002	Santa Ana, California	
Funky Billy Kim ^{(2)} & B-Boy	1	January 8, 2003	Santa Ana, California	
The Ballard Brothers (Shane & Shannon)	6	March 15, 2003	Laughlin, Nevada	
Hardkore Inc. (Hardkore Kidd ^{(3)} & Al Katrazz)	1	April 25, 2003	Anaheim, California	
The Ballard Brothers (Shane & Shannon)	7	February 20, 2004	Anaheim, California	

== UPW Southern California Heavyweight Championship ==
The UPW Southern California Heavyweight Championship was a secondary title contested for in Ultimate Pro Wrestling.

Champion	#	Date	Location	Notes
Mikey Henderson	1	October 12, 2000	Santa Ana, California	Henderson was the Ultimate Pro Wrestling Lightweight Champion when he vacated that title to create the UPW Southern California title. Was stripped for too many no shows.
Tony Jones	1	January 30, 2001	Santa Ana, California	Was awarded the title after winning a six-man tag match.
Tom Howard	1	June 26, 2001	Santa Ana, California	The title is renamed the UPW Shoot Championship on August 22, 2001. Unified with the UPW Heavyweight Championship When Howard beats Christopher Daniels for the Heavyweight title on May 8, 2002

== UPW No Holds Barred Championship ==
The UPW No Holds Barred Championship was a secondary title contested for in Ultimate Pro Wrestling.

Champion	#	Date	Location	Notes
J.D. Dempsey	1	March 28, 2000	Santa Ana, California	Defeated Samoan Joe to become the first champion.
Samoa Joe	1	March 29, 2000	San Diego, California	
Smooth Billy D	1	April 19, 2000	Santa Ana, California	
Shane Ballard	1	April 27, 2000	San Diego, California	

== UPW Internet Championship ==
The UPW Internet Championship was a secondary title contested for in Ultimate Pro Wrestling.

Championship	#	Date	Location	Notes
Navajo Warrior	1	November 8, 2000	Santa Ana, California	Won a Battle royal.
The Blue Meanie	1	March 14, 2001	Santa Ana, California	

== UPW Women's Championship ==
Champion	#	Date	Location	Notes
Erica Porter	1	April 25, 2003	Anaheim, CA	Beat Savvy to become champion.

== See also ==
- List of independent wrestling promotions in the United States
