= Skulu =

American professional wrestler

- Birth name: Televise Masalosalo
- Born: April 2, 1973; Nuʻuuli, American Samoa
- Died: December 21, 2020 (aged 47)

Professional wrestling career
- Ring name(s): Adamonster; Fat Hardy; King Adamo; Samoan Savage; Skulu; Skulu Da Samoan Savage
- Billed height: 1.78 m (5 ft 10 in)
- Billed weight: 142 kg (313 lb)
- Trained by: UPW Wrestling School
- Debut: March 13, 2002
- Retired: 2015

Televise "Ben" Masalosalo (April 2, 1973 – December 21, 2020) was an American Samoan professional wrestler who wrestled as Skulu and King Adamo in various Southern California promotions, Ultimate Pro Wrestling, Hustle, and Pro Wrestling Zero1 in Japan.

== Professional wrestling career ==
Masalosalo was trained at the Ultimate Pro Wrestling professional wrestling school. He made his wrestling debut with the company in 2002. At the end of 2002, he debuted in Japan for Pro Wrestling Zero1 as "King Adamo".

Skulu made a few appearances for WWE in 2003 and 2004 as an enhancement talent. On the August 30, 2004 episode of Monday Night Raw, Skulu teamed up with three other wrestlers in a handicap match against Kane, which Kane won in 22 seconds. Skulu was known as "Fat Hardy" (a parody of Matt Hardy, who was feuding with Kane at the time).

In 2004, Al Katrazz then picked Skulu as his second replacement partner, and together they retained the AWS tag titles two months later against Black Metal and King Jakal.

After leaving both Ultimate Pro Wrestling and Pro Wrestling Zero1, Skulu worked in the independents in California during the rest of his career. He retired from wrestling in 2015.

== Death ==
On December 21, 2020, it was reported that Skulu had died at 47 years old.

== Championships and accomplishments ==
- Alternative Wrestling Show
  - AWS Tag Team Championship (1 time)^{1} – with Al Katrazz
