= Bigger, Stronger, Faster* =

2008 film directed by Chris Bell

- Theatrical release poster
- Directed by: Chris Bell
- Written by: Christopher Bell; Alexander Buono; Tamsin Rawady
- Produced by: Alexander Buono; Jim Czarnecki; Kurt Engfehr; Tamsin Rawady
- Cinematography: Alexander Buono
- Edited by: Brian Singbiel
- Music by: Dave Porter
- Distributed by: Madman Films
- Release dates: January 19, 2008 (Sundance); May 30, 2008 (United States)
- Running time: 105 minutes
- Country: United States
- Language: English
- Box office: $308,575

Bigger, Stronger, Faster* is a 2008 documentary film directed by Chris Bell about the use of anabolic steroids as performance-enhancing drugs in the United States and how this practice relates to the American Dream. The film had its world premiere on January 19, 2008 at the 2008 Sundance Film Festival. The film was shown at the Tribeca Film Festival in April 2008, and opened in limited release in the United States on May 30, 2008.

== Title ==
The asterisk in the title refers to the asterisk attached to the records of athletes who are implicated in using performance-enhancing drugs. The title itself refers to the Olympic motto: "Faster, higher, stronger", also a play on WWE's WrestleMania III theme "Bigger, Better, Badder". The tagline also evokes the lines of the opening sequence of The Six Million Dollar Man, "Better, Stronger, Faster".

== Synopsis ==
The documentary examines the steroid use of director Christopher Bell's two brothers, Mark "Smelly" Bell and Mike "Mad Dog" Bell, who grew up idolizing Arnold Schwarzenegger, Hulk Hogan, and Sylvester Stallone (who all confessed to using steroids or growth hormones to achieve their physiques), and also features professional athletes, medical experts, fitness center members, and US Congressmen talking about the issue of anabolic steroids.

Beyond the basic issue of anabolic steroid use, Bigger, Stronger, Faster* examines the lack of consistency in how the US views drugs, cheating, and the lengths people go to achieve success. The film looks beyond the steroid issue to such topics as Tiger Woods' laser eye correction to 20/15 vision, professional musicians use of blood pressure reducing drugs, or athletes' dependence on cortisone shots, which are a legal steroid. It takes a skeptical view of the health risks of steroids and is critical of the legal health supplement industry.

Christopher Bell on steroid regulation: "If you look at all the laws in our country, and at how and why things get banned, they don’t actually fit into that category: They’re not addictive, they don’t actually kill people. I don’t condone the stuff, but after three years of researching this, it seems like we should take another look."

== Reception ==
The film received highly positive reviews from critics. The review aggregator website Rotten Tomatoes surveyed 76 critics and, categorizing the reviews as positive or negative, assessed 73 as positive and 3 as negative for a 96% rating. Among the reviews, it determined an average rating of 7.70 out of 10. The critics consensus reads "Bigger, Stronger, Faster* is a fascinating, informative, entertaining and especially introspective account of the American 'enhancement' culture." Metacritic reported the film had an average score of 80 out of 100, based on 20 reviews.

Stephen Holden of The New York Times released a positive review shortly before the film's release, noting that it takes a look at steroid use from numerous perspectives and that "[a]lthough the movie doesn't defend steroid use, neither does it go on the attack." Holden said that the film "left [him] convinced that the steroid scandals will abate as the drugs are reluctantly accepted as inevitable products of a continuing revolution in biotechnology. Replaceable body parts, plastic surgery, anti-depressants, Viagra and steroids are just a few of the technological advancements in a never-ending drive to make the species superhuman."

Roger Ebert gave the film 3.5/4 stars, saying that it is "remarkable in that it seems to be interested only in facts".

== Aftermath ==
On December 14, 2008, Mike Bell, brother of the director Chris Bell, who was prominently featured in the film, died at 37. Christian Boeving, whose appearance in the film included the admission of steroid use, was later fired by his sponsor, MuscleTech.

== DVD release ==
The DVD version of the film was released on September 30, 2008.

== See also ==
Prescription Thugs – Sequel to documentary Bigger, Stronger, Faster*
