= Chris Bell (director) =

American director, producer and writer

- Born: November 3, 1972 (age 53); Poughkeepsie, New York, U.S.
- Education: University of Southern California
- Occupations: Director, producer, writer
- Relatives: Mark Bell (brother), Mike Bell (brother)

Chris Bell (born November 3, 1972) is an American director, producer and writer, known for his documentaries Bigger, Stronger, Faster* (2008 as Christopher Bell), Trophy Kids, Prescription Thugs (2015), and A Leaf Of Faith (2018). His work is focused on the impact that society has on our consumption and addictions, especially to prescription drugs.

In the 1980s, purportedly during or after high school, Bell sold gym memberships and became a writer for the WWE, composing storylines for Dwayne Johnson, Steve Austin and John Cena.

== Personal life ==
Bell is the brother of Mark Bell and Mike Bell, both of whom were featured in Bigger, Stronger, Faster*. All three were overweight as children and strove, through competitive lifting, wrestling and, in the case of Bell, steroid use to emulate celebrities Hulk Hogan, Sylvester Stallone and Arnold Schwarzenegger.

In 1997, Bell obtained his Bachelor of Arts in Film Production from the University of Southern California. Francis Ford Coppola wrote a recommendation letter for Bell supporting his enrollment in the University, following Bell's composition of a music video for an MTV competition that Coppola had judged.

Bell currently resides in California. He founded his film production company Bigger Stronger Faster Inc, which is devoted to producing educational documentaries, films, and TV shows. Following a hip replacement surgery in his younger years, he began using prescription drugs, which he struggled with for many years as an addiction. The struggle went on for many years until he had gotten clean during the filming of his recent documentary, Prescription Thugs.
