= Mike Bell (wrestler) =

American professional wrestler (1971–2008)

- Bell as the UPW Heavyweight Champion

Personal information
- Born: Michael Bell; March 18, 1971 Poughkeepsie, New York, U.S.
- Died: December 14, 2008 (aged 37) Costa Mesa, California, U.S.
- Cause of death: Heart attack
- Family: Chris Bell (brother); Mark Bell (brother)

Professional wrestling career
- Ring name(s): Mike Bell; Saber; Mr. Grimm
- Billed height: 6 ft 1 in (1.85 m)
- Billed weight: 257 lb (117 kg)
- Billed from: The Bronx, New York
- Trained by: David Schultz
- Debut: 1992
- Retired: 2007

Michael Bell (March 18, 1971 – December 14, 2008), better known as Mike "Mad Dog" Bell, was an American professional wrestler. He was best known for his appearances in the World Wrestling Federation (WWF) as a jobber throughout the 1990s. He also wrestled for Ultimate Pro Wrestling (UPW), where he won the UPW Heavyweight Championship and served as a trainer, and the original Extreme Championship Wrestling (ECW). He was the brother of Mark Bell and Chris Bell, director of the 2008 documentary, Bigger, Stronger, Faster*, and the 2015 follow up documentary, Prescription Thugs, in which Mike Bell's life and death by prescription drugs are explored.

== Early life ==
Michael Bell was born on March 18, 1971, in Poughkeepsie, New York. He was bullied as a child for struggling with weight issues, often being called "Pugsley" whenever he entered his school bus. In response, he beat up his bullies, earning him the nickname “Mad Dog”. Bell graduated from Arlington High School in 1988, where he was the captain of the football team. He enrolled at the University of Cincinnati on a football scholarship, playing Division I football until a knee injury ended his aspirations.

== Professional wrestling career ==
=== World Wrestling Federation/Entertainment (1992–2003) ===
Bell made his debut for the World Wrestling Federation (WWF) on July 21, 1992, during a Wrestling Challenge taping in a tag team match, teaming with Tony DeVito in a loss to The Natural Disasters (Earthquake and Typhoon). He was prominently featured as a jobber throughout the 1990s, including on the WWF's flagship TV show, Monday Night Raw, despite not being under a contract. He lost to the likes of Mr. Perfect, Owen Hart, The Undertaker, Razor Ramon and the 1-2-3 Kid.

The most notable moment of Bell's WWF career stemmed from an incident during a match with Perry Saturn at a Jakked/Metal taping on May 17, 2001. Bell botched a snapmare arm drag, causing Saturn to land on the mat head first. Saturn legitimately attacked Bell in retaliation for this perceived lack of professionalism and in-ring ethic, at one point tossing Bell out of the ring and causing Bell himself to land on his head on the safety mat. Neither performer sustained serious injury, and both were able to resume their respective roles and finish the match as planned. Bell's final match with the company was on October 13, 2003, where he and his brother, Mark, lost to Garrison Cade and Mark Jindrak.

=== Ultimate Pro Wrestling (1999–2001, 2007) ===
In 1999, Bell joined Rick Bassman's promotion, Ultimate Pro Wrestling (UPW), where he won the UPW Heavyweight Championship. He recorded three successful title defenses, before being stripped of the championship on January 9, 2000. Bell also served as a head trainer at Ultimate University, the promotion's training facility, helping train the likes of John Cena and Samoa Joe.

His final documented match occurred for UPW on January 27, 2007, in a four corners match involving Kid Vicious, Mario Quezada and Tommy Kim, which Vicious won.

=== Extreme Championship Wrestling (2000–2001) ===
Bell first appeared for Extreme Championship Wrestling (ECW) as a referee on the October 21, 2000 episode of Hardcore TV, where he was attacked by ECW World Television Champion Rhyno, who sent Bell through a table with a Gore. In November, he suffered two non-televised losses to Balls Mahoney and Michael Shane, as well as a loss to Chilly Willy on the December 15 episode of Hardcore TV. His final appearance was in a dark match before ECW's final pay-per-view, Guilty as Charged, on January 7, 2001, losing to Bilvis Wesley.

== Death ==
On December 14, 2008, Bell, aged 37, died at 1:30 PM PST at a rehabilitation facility in Costa Mesa, California. He had been sober for 60 days, and his body was found by his roommate. Upon his death, WWE released a statement saying "Although Mr. Bell was never under a WWE contract, WWE extends its deepest condolences to the Bell family." At the time of his death, he was working as a personal trainer and accountant at his father's financial company, Mike Bell Inc. Bell's cause of death was ruled as an inhalation-induced heart attack brought on by inhalation of difluoroethane in Dust-Off, a compressed gas product used for cleaning objects such as computer keyboards, which is sometimes abused for its intoxicating effects.

== Championships and accomplishments ==
- Awesome Championship Wrestling
  - MJN Center Hall of Fame (2026)
- Ultimate Pro Wrestling
  - UPW Heavyweight Championship (1 time)

== See also ==
- List of premature professional wrestling deaths
