= Blue Wolf =

Mongolian professional wrestler

Personal information
- Born: Dolgorsürengiin Serjbüdee; December 1, 1976 (age 49) Ulaanbaatar, Mongolia

Professional wrestling career
- Ring name: Blue Wolf
- Billed height: 182 cm (6 ft 0 in)
- Billed weight: 115 kg (254 lb)
- Trained by: New Japan Dojo
- Debut: August 10, 2001
- Retired: December 3, 2006

Dolgorsürengiin Serjbüdee (Mongolian: Долгорсүрэнгийн Сэржбүдээ, Japanese: ドルゴルスレン・セルジブデ, romanized: Dorugorusuren Serujibude) is a Mongolian retired professional wrestler, best known for his time with New Japan Pro-Wrestling (NJPW), where he wrestled under the ring name Blue Wolf (ブルー・ウルフ, Burū Urufu). He also competed once in mixed martial arts in 2004, defeating fellow professional wrestler Tom Howard.

== Professional wrestling career ==
Dolgorsürengiin Serjbüdee is the brother of Dolgorsürengiin Sumyaabazar, a high ranking Mongolian traditional wrestler, and Asashōryū Akinori (Dolgorsürengiin Dagvadorj), a sumo yokozuna. Because of this fact, Serjbüdee received a large amount of press coverage when he became the first Mongolian professional wrestler when he joined New Japan Pro-Wrestling.

Serjbüdee made his debut during the 2001 G1 Climax tournament, facing Shinya Makabe. Having wrestled in amateur and sumo competitions since he was 15 years old, he showed immediate skill, strength and submission knowledge. Showing remarkable growth going into 2002, he was putting up good fights against established wrestling names. In January, 2002 he changed his ring name to Blue Wolf, which was similar to that of his brother's sumo name, Blue Dragon. This made it easier to promote Serjbüdee.

He joined Kensuke Sasaki's short-lived SWING-LOWS faction in July, 2002, which placed him into more feature matches. Even though he was often the loser in these matches, just the fact that he was even in such a position as a rookie was quite amazing. In 2006, Blue Wolf failed to renegotiate a contract with NJPW, however stating he would fight in the company without a contract. Blue Wolf has not yet been seen again in NJPW, pointing towards a return to Mongolia where he runs his own dojo.

== Personal life ==
Blue Wolf has one son, Serjbüdeegiin Luvsangombo. Like other family members such as Asashōryū and Hōshōryū, Luvsangombo decided in October 2024 to pursue a career in professional sumo, signing up after his studies at Meitoku Gijuku High School in Kōchi Prefecture within Shikoroyama stable.

== Mixed martial arts career ==
In May 2004, Serjbüdee defeated fellow pro wrestler Tom Howard (aka "Green Beret") in an overwhelming mixed martial arts debut victory hosted by K-1.

=== Mixed martial arts record ===
Res.	Record	Opponent	Method	Event	Date	Round	Time	Location	Notes
Win	1-0	(United States) Tom Howard	TKO (knees)	K-1 MMA ROMANEX	May 22, 2004	2	4:44	Saitama, Japan	

== Championships and accomplishments ==
- New Japan Pro-Wrestling
  - Yuko Six Man Tag Team Tournament (2004) – with Shinsuke Nakamura and Katsuhiko Nakajima
