= Wrestling Society X =

US television program and wrestling promotion

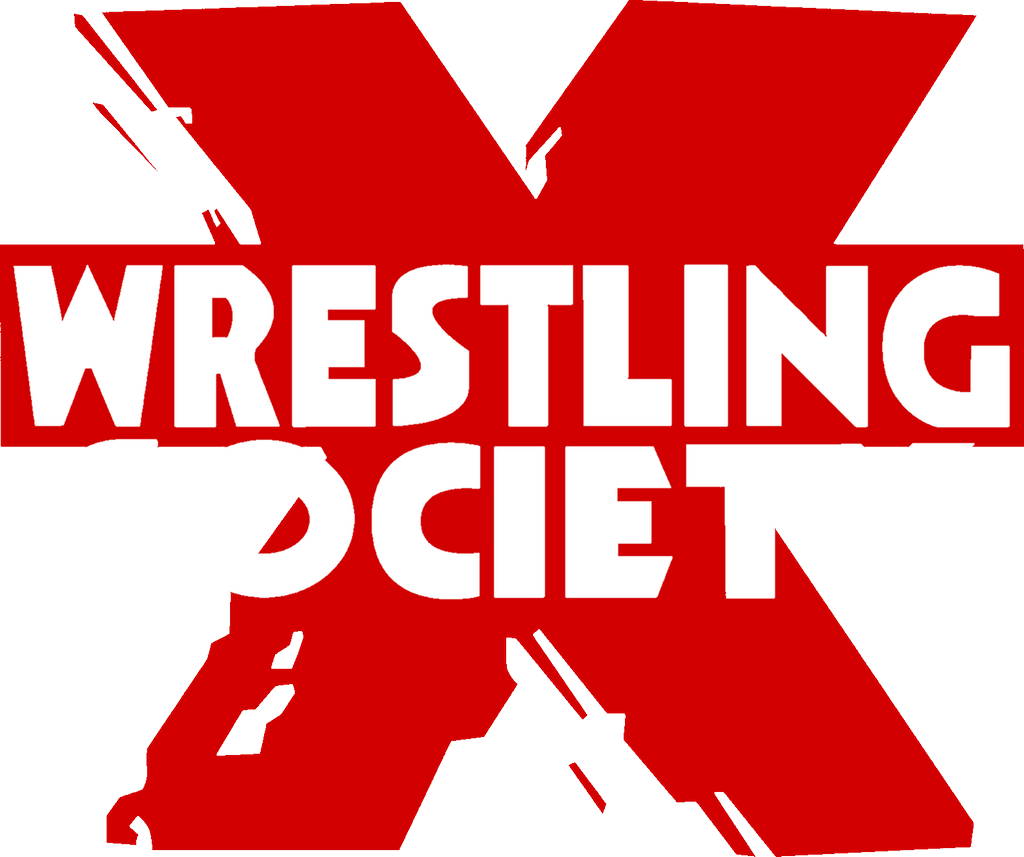
- Created by: Kevin Kleinrock; Houston Curtis
- Developed by: Big Vision Entertainment
- Presented by: Kris Kloss; Bret Ernst
- Starring: WSX roster
- Opening theme: "Organism" by The Ernies
- Ending theme: "Dickin' Around" by Nicholas Joseph Nolan (from Extreme Music)
- Country of origin: United States
- No. of episodes: 9 (1 unaired)

Production
- Executive producers: Houston Curtis; Sam Korkis
- Production location: WSX Bunker in Los Angeles, California
- Camera setup: Multicamera setup
- Running time: 30 minutes
- Production companies: Big Vision Entertainment; MTV Series Entertainment

Original release
- Network: MTV
- Release: January 30 – March 14, 2007

Wrestling Society X (WSX) was an American professional wrestling promotion owned by Big Vision Entertainment. Wrestling Society X (WSX) also refers to the promotion's short-lived television series produced in 2007 by Big Vision Entertainment and MTV Series Entertainment. The weekly television series aired on MTV, MTV2, MTV Tr3s, and over a dozen other MTV outlets throughout the world. WSXtra, a program featuring WSX matches and interviews not broadcast on MTV, was available on the MTV website and on television via video on demand services.

WSX was presented as a wrestling-based secret society that used a venue referred to as the "WSX Bunker", complete with an artificially worn-out looking wrestling ring for its matches. All matches held within this venue were held under the falls count anywhere stipulation. The promotion and series also stood out due to its unorthodox presentation of wrestling; this included frequent use of highly expressive plants, crowd sound effects, electrical sound effects, visual effects, and camera shakes when a wrestler would fall onto "electrified weapons". Along with wrestling, WSX on MTV featured musical guests playing at the start of each television broadcast, with some band members joining the broadcast team (consisting of Kris Kloss and Bret Ernst) after the performance.

== History ==
The WSX pilot was taped on February 10, 2006, in Los Angeles, California, and all wrestlers present were forced to sign an agreement stating that they would take part in a full season if the show was picked up by MTV. Delirious did not wrestle at the taping, despite originally being scheduled to. This was due to his refusal to sign the agreement, as it would have prevented him from working for Total Nonstop Action Wrestling. On July 8, 2006, MTV commissioned the promotion to produce a full season of episodes for their network, and WSX taped its first season of shows between November 11 and November 16, 2006, in Los Angeles, California. The tapings were booked by head writer Kevin Kleinrock, Cody Michaels and Vampiro – all formerly of Xtreme Pro Wrestling.

The series premiered January 30, 2007, on MTV. It originally aired Tuesdays at 10:30 p.m. ET, to compete with the second half of World Wrestling Entertainment's ECW on Sci Fi program. The WSX Championship was the only title featured and defended on the program, but announcer Kris Kloss hinted (towards the end of the series) at the arrival of the WSX Tag Team Championship, which would've been defended in tag team matches during future seasons. Additionally, on the unaired season finale, the creation of an X Division-style title was announced for the show's second season. The fourth episode of the series was pulled by MTV after a spot featuring Ricky Banderas throwing a fireball at Vampiro was deemed unairable by the network, but the episode would later air in edited form on February 27, 2007. On February 28, 2007, it was announced that WSX had been canceled by MTV.

A marathon of new episodes, consisting of episodes 5–9, aired on March 13 and 14, 2007, with MTV later announcing that the marathon had served as the season finale of WSX. WSX was quietly removed from its scheduled MTV slot on March 20 and reruns were pulled from air. A tenth episode which was set to be the original season finale never aired on television but was later released on the Wrestling Society X: The Complete First (and Last) Season DVD. In the summer of 2007, all WSX wrestlers were released from their contracts and the promotion became inactive.

== WSX Championship ==
WSX Championship

Details
- Promotion: Wrestling Society X
- Date established: November 11, 2006 (aired February 6, 2007)
- Date retired: July 17, 2007
Statistics
- First champion: Vampiro
- Final champion: Ricky Banderas
- Most reigns: Vampiro and Ricky Banderas (1)
- Longest reign: Ricky Banderas
- Shortest reign: Vampiro
- Oldest champion: Vampiro
- Youngest champion: Ricky Banderas

The WSX Championship was the only professional wrestling championship in the short-lived Wrestling Society X promotion. A ten-man WSX Rumble,^{[a]} which aired on January 30, 2007, was held to decide the participants in the first WSX Championship match, with 6-Pac and Vampiro winning. On November 11, 2006 (aired February 6, 2007), Vampiro defeated 6-Pac with a Tombstone Piledriver inside an exploding coffin to become the first WSX Champion. Rick Banderas defeated Vampiro on November 15, 2006 (aired March 14, 2007) with a Chokeslam into an exploding coffin wrapped in barbed wire to win the WSX Championship. The promotion aired its last episodes on MTV in March 2007, and Banderas was stripped of the championship on July 17, 2007 when the promotion closed. Statistically, Banderas held the title the longest.

Key
No.	Overall reign number
Reign	Reign number for the specific champion
Days	Number of days held

No.	Champion	Championship change			Reign statistics		Notes	Ref.
No.	Champion	Date	Event	Location	Reign	Days	Notes	Ref.
1	Vampiro	November 11, 2006	Wrestling Society X #2	Los Angeles, California	1	4	This match aired on February 6, 2007. Vampiro defeated 6-Pac to win the inaugural championship. Vampiro and 6-Pac earned their spot in the inaugural championship match by winning the ten-man WSX Rumble match,^{[a]} that took place on February 9, 2006 and aired on Wrestling Society X #1.	
2	Ricky Banderas	November 15, 2006	Wrestling Society X #8	Los Angeles, California	1	244	This match aired on March 14, 2007.	
—	Deactivated	July 17, 2007	—	—	—	—	The championship was retired due to the closure of the promotion.	

== Episodes ==
#	Air date	Network	Timeslot (ET)	Rating	Main event	Musical guest
01	January 30, 2007	MTV	10:30 pm	1.0	6-Pac and Vampiro won the WSX Rumble^{[a]}	Black Label Society
02	February 6, 2007	MTV	10:30 pm	0.7	Vampiro defeated 6-Pac to win the inaugural WSX Championship	Three 6 Mafia
03	February 13, 2007	MTV	10:30 pm	0.5	Alkatrazz and Luke Hawx defeated Los Pochos Guapos (Aaron Aguilera and Kaos) in a Tables, Ladders and Cervezas match	Sparta
04	February 27, 2007	MTV	10:30 pm	0.6	Keepin' It Gangsta (Babi Slymm and Ruckus) defeated That 70's Team (Disco Machine and Joey Ryan)	Clipse
05	March 13, 2007	MTV	11:00 pm	0.6	Arik Cannon vs. Delikado ended in a no contest	Jibbs
06	March 13, 2007	MTV	11:30 pm	0.4	That 70's Team (Disco Machine and Joey Ryan) defeated D.I.F.H. (Jimmy Jacobs and Tyler Black)	Good Charlotte
07	March 14, 2007	MTV	12:00 am	0.4	Los Pochos Guapos (Aaron Aguilera and Kaos) defeated The Filth and The Fury (M-Dogg 20 and Teddy Hart)	Quietdrive
08	March 14, 2007	MTV	12:30 am	0.4	Ricky Banderas defeated Vampiro (c) to win the WSX Championship	Pitbull
09	March 14, 2007	MTV	01:00 am	0.3	Human Tornado vs. Jack Evans ended in a time limit draw	Styles P
10	Unaired	–	–	–	Team Dragon Gate (Horiguchi and Yoshino) defeated The Filth and The Fury (M-Dogg 20 and Teddy Hart) in an Exploding Cage match	New Found Glory

MTV aired unadvertised previews of the first two episodes the Friday before they premiered at 11:00 pm ET. Prior to WSX debuting, this timeslot normally averaged a 0.10 rating. The first preview episode on January 26 drew a 0.43 rating, while the second preview episode on February 2 drew 0.50. MTV discontinued preview airings beginning with the third episode in hopes of maximizing ratings for the Tuesday broadcasts.

== Home video ==
Wrestling Society X: The Complete First (and Last) Season DVD was released on November 13, 2007. The set features all 10 WSX episodes, all 10 WSXtra episodes, deleted scenes and special features. All of the musical performances were edited off of the DVD set. Also on the DVD was content already recorded for the second season, including a WSX Championship scaffold match between Ricky Banderas and Youth Suicide and footage from a feud between Nic Grimes and Mickie Knuckles.

== See also ==
- List of professional wrestling television series
- Xtreme Pro Wrestling

== Notes ==
- A:^{a} ^{b} ^{c} – A WSX Rumble match starts out as a Royal Rumble-style match and, when all the participants have entered the match, becomes a Ladder match.
