= Frankie Kazarian =

American professional wrestler (born 1977)

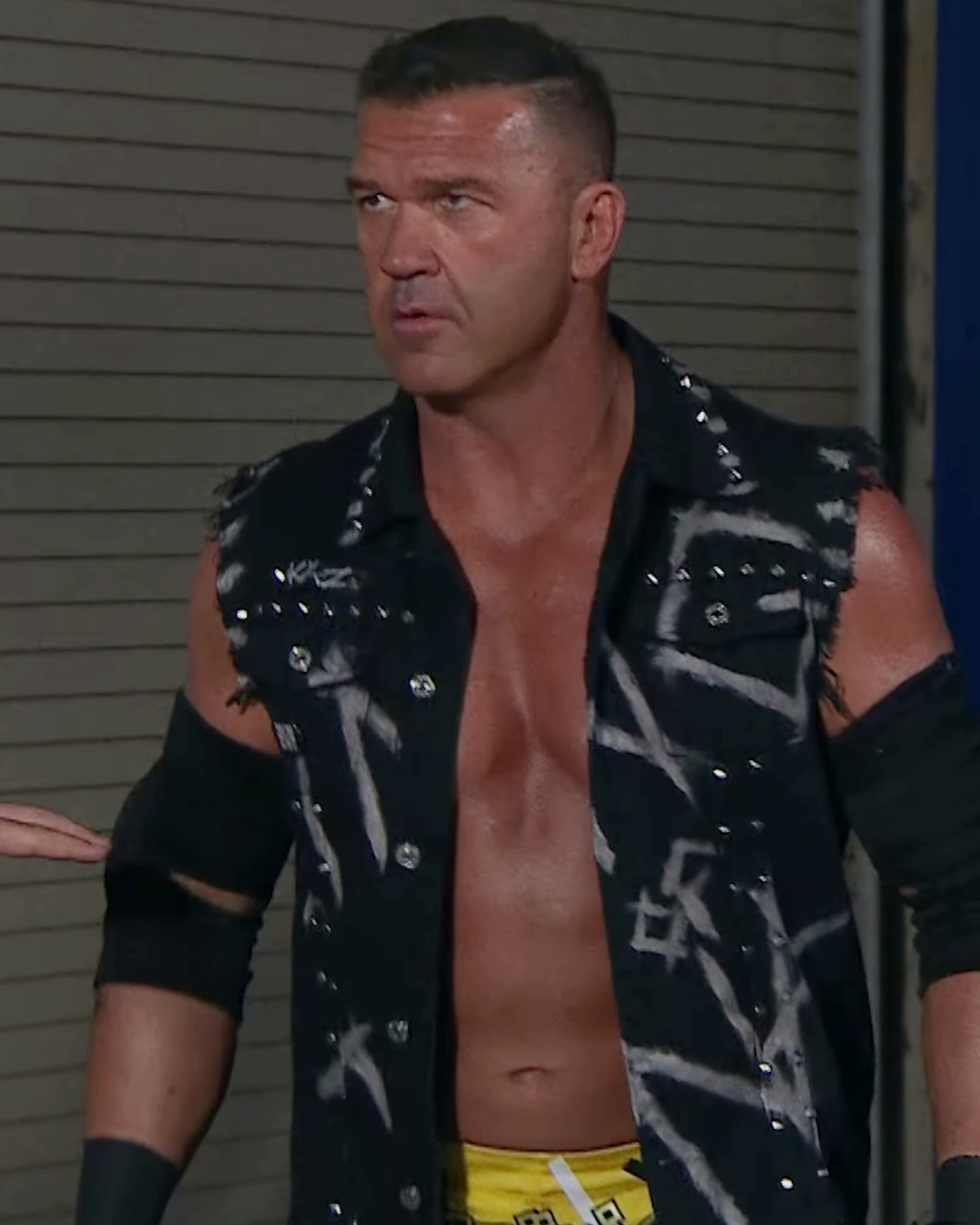
- Kazarian in 2026

Personal information
- Born: Frank Benedict Gerdelman; August 4, 1977 (age 49) Palm Springs, California, U.S.
- Spouse: Traci Brooks (m. 2010)
- Children: 1

Professional wrestling career
- Ring name(s): Frankie; Frankie Gerdelman; Frankie Kazarian; Kaz; Kazarian; Suicide
- Billed height: 6 ft 1 in (1.85 m)
- Billed weight: 220 lb (100 kg)
- Billed from: Anaheim, California "Beautiful" Southern California; Yucca Valley, California
- Trained by: Killer Kowalski; Jesse Hernandez; Bill Anderson; Ultimate Pro Wrestling
- Debut: May 15, 1998

Frank Benedict Gerdelman (born August 4, 1977) is an American professional wrestler. He is signed to Total Nonstop Action Wrestling (TNA), where he performs under the ring name Frankie Kazarian. He is a former one-time TNA World Champion. He is also known for his work in Ring of Honor (ROH) and All Elite Wrestling (AEW), as well as several independent promotions, most notably Pro Wrestling Guerrilla (PWG), where he has won multiple tag-team and singles championships.

Kazarian began his career in 1998 and performed on several independent promotions. During the 2000s, he worked for Pro Wrestling Guerrilla, where he became the inaugural and two-time PWG World Champion. From 2003 until 2014, he wrestled for Total Nonstop Action Wrestling (TNA). He began a tag team with Michael Shane known as Shazarian. In 2007, he shortened his name to Kaz and briefly worked under the Suicide character between 2008 and 2010. After returning to the Kazarian name, he joined the Fourtune stable, where he stayed until 2012. In 2012, he began to work with Christopher Daniels as a tag team named Bad Influence, winning the TNA World Tag Team Championship twice. With a total of 4 reigns as X Division champion (one as co-champion with Shane and one as Suicide) and three as World Tag Team Champion, he left the company in 2014.

After leaving TNA, Daniels and Kazarian reunited in Ring of Honor, where they stayed until 2018. They changed the name of the tag team to The Addiction and later, they were joined by Scorpio Sky as SoCal Uncensored. He won the ROH Tag Team Championship twice with Daniels and once with Sky and the trio won the ROH World Six-Man Tag Team Championship. During this time, Daniels and Kazarian appeared in international promotions, such as New Japan Pro-Wrestling. After leaving ROH, the trio joined the new promotion All Elite Wrestling, where Kazarian and Sky became the first AEW World Tag Team Champions. In 2022, Kazarian also worked with Impact Wrestling, where he won his fifth X Division Championship (becoming the title’s 100th champion in the process), later signing with the company in 2023, after being granted his release from AEW.

== Early life ==
Frank Benedict Gerdelman was born on August 4, 1977, in Palm Springs, California.

== Professional wrestling career ==
=== Early career (1998–2003) ===
Kazarian began training with Killer Kowalski in Malden, Massachusetts in 1998, and wrestled his debut match after one month's training, facing Freight Train Dan. After remaining at Kowalski's school for eight months, Kazarian returned to Southern California and began wrestling on the independent circuit, primarily in the Empire Wrestling Federation, where he continued his training and teamed with Josh Galaxy as "Bad Influence".

Impact Wrestling commentator Mike Tenay revealed in a late 2007 shoot interview that during a World Championship Wrestling event in San Diego, California in 2000, a fan appeared to him and boldly declared that "someday, [Tenay] will be calling one of [his] matches". That fan was none other than Kazarian himself.

In 2000, Kazarian joined Ultimate Pro Wrestling, and in March 2001 he formed a tag team with Nova known as "Evolution". On March 10, 2001, he became the first Millennium Pro Wrestling (MPW) World Champion by defeating Christopher Daniels and Adam Pearce in a three-way dance. On May 30, 2001, Evolution won the vacant Ultimate Pro Wrestling Tag Team title. He travelled to Japan as part of the Ultimate Pro Wrestling (UPW) roster in 2002, where he faced Steve Corino, and also as part of Evolution he and Nova were defeated by Edge and Christian. He used to freestyle rap along with his close friends John Cena and Samoa Joe while the three of them were on the road in UPW.

He toured the UK, Australia and New Zealand with the now defunct World Wrestling All-Stars promotion in May 2003, where he met Glenn Gilberti and Scott D'Amore, leading to his being offered a job by Total Nonstop Action Wrestling.

=== Pro Wrestling Guerrilla (2003–2008) ===
==== PWG Champion (2003–2004) ====
Kazarian worked for the upstart Southern Californian promotion Pro Wrestling Guerrilla from the very beginning, headlining its first event on July 26, 2003 against AJ Styles in a losing effort. The following month, Kazarian participated in the Bad Ass Mother 3000 tournament to determine the first-ever PWG Champion. He defeated Scott Lost in the opening round on August 29 and Lil Cholo in the quarterfinals, Christopher Daniels in the semifinals and Joey Ryan in the final to win the tournament and become the inaugural PWG Champion on August 30. Kazarian successfully defended the title against Styles and Daniels in a three-way match at Are You Adequately Prepared To Rock? and American Dragon at An Inch Longer Than Average.

Kazarian began his first major feud as champion with Adam Pearce after Pearce pinned Kazarian in a six-man tag team match at Pimpin' In High Places. Pearce earned a title shot against Kazarian on the night one of Tango & Cash Invitational, which ended in a time limit draw, resulting in Kazarian retaining the title. Kazarian successfully defended the title against Babi Slymm, Jonny Storm and M-Dogg 20 in a four-way elimination match on the second night of the tournament. Kazarian lost the title to Pearce at Taste The Radness on February 22, 2004.

Kazarian spent the next few months, feuding with Pearce and his Hardkore Inc. stablemates. He received a title shot against Pearce in a four-way dance, also involving Babi Slymm and Jardi Frantz at Rocktoberfest, where Pearce retained the title via disqualification. At the company's first anniversary show, The Reason for the Season on July 10, Kazarian became the first two-time PWG Champion by defeating Pearce in a "Loser Leaves PWG" steel cage match. He would hold the title for the next four months, retaining it against Colt Cabana, Samoa Joe and Ricky Reyes until Free Admission! (Just Kidding on November 13, when he was defeated by Super Dragon.

==== Various feuds and championship pursuits (2005–2008) ====
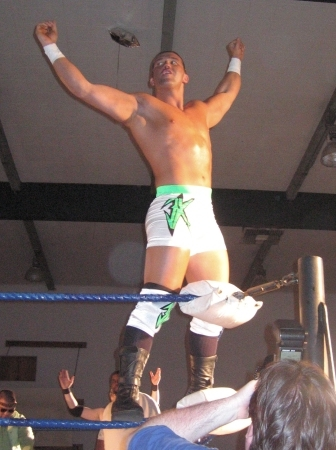
Kazarian posing on the turnbuckle before his match at a Pro Wrestling Guerrilla show in 2005

In early 2005, Kazarian feuded with Arrogance (Chris Bosh and Scott Lost), with the rivalry beginning after Arrogance cost Kazarian, a match against Tony Stradlin at All Nude Revue. Kazarian began pursuing the PWG Tag Team Championship, with Kazarian and a mystery partner set to challenge Arrogance for the Tag Team Championship at The Ernest P. Worrell Memorial. Kazarian revealed his tag team partner to be Lost's former X Foundation tag team partner Joey Ryan. Kazarian and Ryan lost after Kazarian prevented him from using a steel chair. Ryan turned on Kazarian by attacking him after the match and joined Arrogance. Kazarian teamed with The Aerial Express (Quicksilver and Scorpio Sky) to defeat the Arrogance trio on the first night of All Star Weekend. On the night two, Kazarian teamed with Chris Sabin to unsuccessfully challenge Bosh and Lost for the Tag Team Championship.

On the first night of the 2nd Annual PWG Bicentennial Birthday Extravaganza, Kazarian challenged AJ Styles for the PWG Championship, with the match ending in a double count-out. At Smells Like Speen Spirit, Kazarian teamed with Petey Williams to challenge 2 Skinny Black Guys (El Generico and Human Tornado) for the Tag Team Championship in a losing effort. In September, Kazarian participated in the inaugural Battle of Los Angeles tournament, where he lost to Rocky Romero in the first round. On the first night of All Star Weekend 3, Kazarian defeated Jimmy Yang in a tournament to determine the #1 contender for the PWG World Championship, thus qualifying to the fatal four-way tournament final on night two against B-Boy, Chris Sabin and Kevin Steen. B-Boy won the match.

At Please Don't Call It (The O.C.), Kazarian joined B-Boy as his mystery tag team partner against the World Champion Joey Ryan and Scorpio Sky. Kazarian pinned Ryan for the win and demanded a title shot against Ryan, which resulted in Ryan and Sky attacking Kazarian and B-Boy after the match and Sky cut off Kazarian's ponytail. While in WWE the previous year, Kazarian had gotten in trouble with company management after refusing to cut his hair and this was one of the reasons he had asked for his release. This marked the beginning of a lengthy feud between Kazarian and the newly formed faction Dynasty, specifically Sky. Kazarian unsuccessfully challenged Ryan for the World Championship at Fear of a Black Planet. Kazarian defeated Sky via disqualification in the first round of the 2006 Battle of Los Angeles after Sky's manager Jade Chung hit him with a pair of scissors. Kazarian was attacked by the Dynasty before his scheduled quarterfinal match against Super Dragon, thus knocking him out. He was carried out on a stretcher and was eliminated from the tournament via forfeit.

At Self-Titled, Kazarian lost a handicap first blood match to Sky and Chung. After facing off Sky and his Dynasty stablemates in a series of tag team matches over the next few months, Kazarian defeated Sky in a Loser Leaves PWG match at Based on a True Story on January 13, 2007, to end the feud, just as he did with Adam Pearce. With Sky gone from PWG (in storyline), Kazarian continued his feud with Dynasty as he took on Joey Ryan in a match at Guitarmageddon II: Armoryageddon, which Kazarian lost after an interference by Karl Anderson. This led to a match between Kazarian and Anderson at Holy Diver Down, which Kazarian lost after a man wearing Scorpio Sky's mask interfered in the match. At Album of the Year, Kazarian challenged Disco Machine for the latter's ownership of PWG, which Kazarian lost after a distraction by commissioner Dino Winwood and referee Rick Knox.

On the first night of All Star Weekend V, Kazarian teamed with T.J. Perkins, Ronin and Top Gun Talwar against Dynasty and Karl Anderson in a losing effort. Kazarian left PWG in May 2007, when TNA Wrestling pulled all of their talent from the company. He made a one night return to the promotion, nine months later, on February 24, 2008, to participate in the ¡Dia de los Dangerous! tournament for the vacant PWG World Championship, where he lost to Karl Anderson in the opening round.

=== Total Nonstop Action Wrestling (2003–2005) ===
Kazarian knew Impact Wrestling President Jeff Jarrett and Scott D'Amore during a World Wrestling All-Stars tour and they invited him to a tryout. Kazarian joined Total Nonstop Action Wrestling (TNA) in the summer of 2003, and quickly began pursuing the TNA X Division Championship. He was part of the first ever Ultimate X match, on August 20, 2003, along with Michael Shane and Chris Sabin, which was won by Shane. Kazarian did not appear with TNA Wrestling between October 2003 and March 2004.

After Chris Sabin was stripped of the title while sidelined with a knee injury, Kazarian eventually won the X Division title on March 31, 2004, defeating The Amazing Red in a match for the vacant title. He lost the belt to A.J. Styles on June 9, 2004.

In June 2004 he and Shane formed a tag team (informally known as Shazarian) managed by Traci Brooks. They claimed to resent the fact that A.J. Styles had held the TNA X Division Championship, then the NWA World Heavyweight Championship, then had won the X Division Championship once more. This was purportedly illegal according to a previously unknown by law of the Impact Wrestling rulebook, which stated that an X Division competitor who participated for the Heavyweight Championship could not return to the X Division. On July 28, 2004, he and Shane faced Styles in an Ultimate X match. Kazarian and Shane were declared co-champions when both took possession of the title belt at the same time. On August 11 they defended the title in a twenty two man Gauntlet for the Gold match. Kazarian started at number one and was one of the final three participants, but was eliminated by The Amazing Red, who in turn was eliminated by Petey Williams.

Kazarian was put in the same situation at November's Victory Road where he entered number one in a 20-man X Division Gauntlet and was the last man eliminated.

Throughout late 2004 and early 2005, Kazarian and Shane competed in the TNA tag team division. Kazarian's contract with TNA Wrestling expired in September 2004 and was not renewed, but he continued working with the company on a per appearance basis. The duo eventually began a feud with the 3Live Kru and Jeff Hammond, a NASCAR analyst who was working with Impact Wrestling as a commentator. This led to a match at the Against All Odds pay-per-view on February 13, 2005, between Hammond and Kru member B.G. James and Shane and Kazarian. Kazarian was pinned by Hammond after Shane miscued on a superkick and knocked him out.

=== World Wrestling Entertainment (2005, 2024-2025) ===
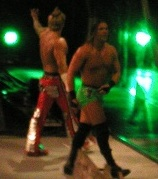
Kazarian and Shannon Moore after winning a match at a taping of WWE Velocity

On February 25, 2005, Kazarian left TNA and signed with World Wrestling Entertainment (WWE). He was assigned to Ohio Valley Wrestling, the top formative division of WWE. He made his WWE television debut in an episode of Velocity on July 16, with the name The Future Frankie Kazarian defeating Nunzio, and remained undefeated through July and August. In this time, he picked up victories against Scotty 2 Hotty, Funaki, and Paul London. On August 15, Kazarian announced on his website that he had left WWE two days earlier. He later revealed that he had asked for his release after realizing that the company had no plans to revamp its cruiserweight division.

On the June 18, 2024 episode of WWE NXT, Kazarian made a one-off return appearance and participated in a Battle Royal for a shot at the NXT Championship. In this match, he eliminated his on-screen rival Joe Hendry.

Kazarian was parted on TNA team to defeat Team NXT at Showdown on October 7, 2025 in a 4-on-4 men's Survivor Series style elimination match, eliminating Myles Borne, but was eliminated by Ricky Saints, and winning the match for Team TNA.

=== Return to TNA (2006–2014) ===
==== Serotonin (2006–2007) ====
Kazarian returned to TNA on July 16, 2006, at Victory Road, in a Championship match loss to TNA X Division Champion Senshi. Afterwards he and his old tag team partner Michael Shane (now known as "Maverick" Matt Bentley due to name trademark issues) resumed in their tag team, before disappearing from television for weeks. Later resurfacing with a new goth look, the duo would be joined by Johnny Devine and all became subservient to Raven, forming the stable Serotonin. As part of Serotonin, his name was shortened to the simple and supposedly cryptic "Kaz". Kaz eventually became the first Serotonin member to become very rebellious towards Raven. Kaz turned on Raven on June 21, 2007, by attacking fellow members of Serotonin, Havok and Martyr, costing him a match against Chris Harris.

==== Kaz (2007–2008) ====
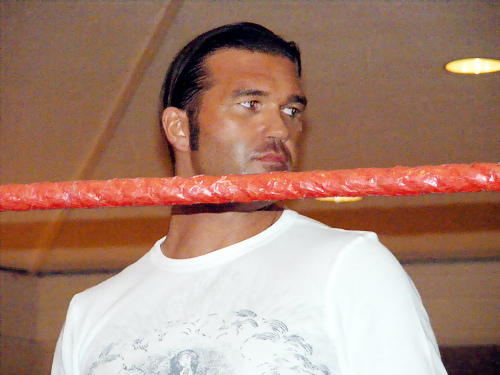
Kazarian at the Killer Kowalski Memorial Show in Malden, Massachusetts on October 26, 2008

After his split with Serotonin, he began using his old ring attire and entrance video which both said the full "Kazarian" - though it was all later changed to only say the simple Kaz except for a few references on the TNA website. Shortly after this, he engaged in a brief feud with Robert Roode over his treatment of Ms. Brooks. Kaz would take part in the Ultimate X Gauntlet match to determine the #1 contender to the TNA X Division Championship at Victory Road. Although he lost the match, his cutter on Christopher Daniels off the cable ropes while the latter was hanging upside down became a notable spot. Kaz would next be entered in the 2007 Fight for the Right Tournament, which he won by defeating Christian Cage at Genesis in the finals in a ladder match. On the Impact! following Genesis, Kurt Angle barely defeated Kaz to retain the TNA World Championship.

At the 2007 Turning Point pay-per-view, he was partnered with Booker T against Christian Cage and Robert Roode, with Kaz and Booker winning. He then began attacking Dustin Rhodes, and stealing things from Rhodes' alter ego "Black Reign". He defeated Black Reign at Final Resolution. After defeating Black Reign, Kaz and Black Reign competed in a Four Corner Mouse Trap match were Kaz won but Black Reign ended up getting his things back from Kaz after hitting Kaz with his Darkness Falls weapon. On February 23, Kaz defeated Rellik. After the match, Black Reign and Rellik attacked Kaz. Eric Young ran out to help but got too scared to do anything. At Destination X, Kaz and Young defeated Black Reign and Rellik leading to Kaz and Young (now 'Super Eric') becoming a tag team. On April 13, at Lockdown 2008, they won the Cuffed in a Cage match. On the April 17 episode of TNA Impact!, following Lockdown, Kaz and Young defeated the holders of the TNA World Tag Team Championship, AJ Styles and Tomko and The Latin American Xchange (LAX) in a triple threat tag team match for the titles after Young's alter ego, "Super Eric" pinned Styles with a bridging suplex. Later in the night, Styles complained to Jim Cornette that since Young was signed to the match, not Super Eric, and Young claimed that he and Super Eric are different people, Super Eric's involvement was outside interference. When Eric refused to admit that he was Super Eric, Cornette vacated the titles.

Following Kaz and Young's loss to LAX in a Deuces Wild Tournament qualifying match, Kaz competed in and won the Terror Dome Match at Sacrifice, becoming number one contender to the X Division Championship, and also taking Kurt Angle's place in the triple threat match for the TNA World Heavyweight Championship. The match was won by Samoa Joe, who retained the title. On the June 5 episode of Impact! Kaz won a future title match for the TNA World Heavyweight Championship in the first ever X Division King of the Mountain Match. He then failed to win the X Division championship at Slammiversary, losing to the X Division Champion Petey Williams. He then challenged Joe the following Thursday on Impact! for the TNA World Heavyweight Championship in a losing effort. He led Team TNA in the 2008 World X Cup and was in the final round at Victory Road, but lost after he pulled off a huge leg drop on Daivari off the top of the Ultimate X structure. On July 21, 2008, TNA's official website announced that Kaz had been released, but it was revealed to be a storyline. He was later interviewed by Karen Angle to further the storyline, and claimed that after failing to beat Kurt Angle for the TNA World Heavyweight Championship and letting down his company in the finals of the World X Cup, he had fallen out of love with wrestling and, so, had made the decision to leave.

==== Suicide (2008–2010) ====
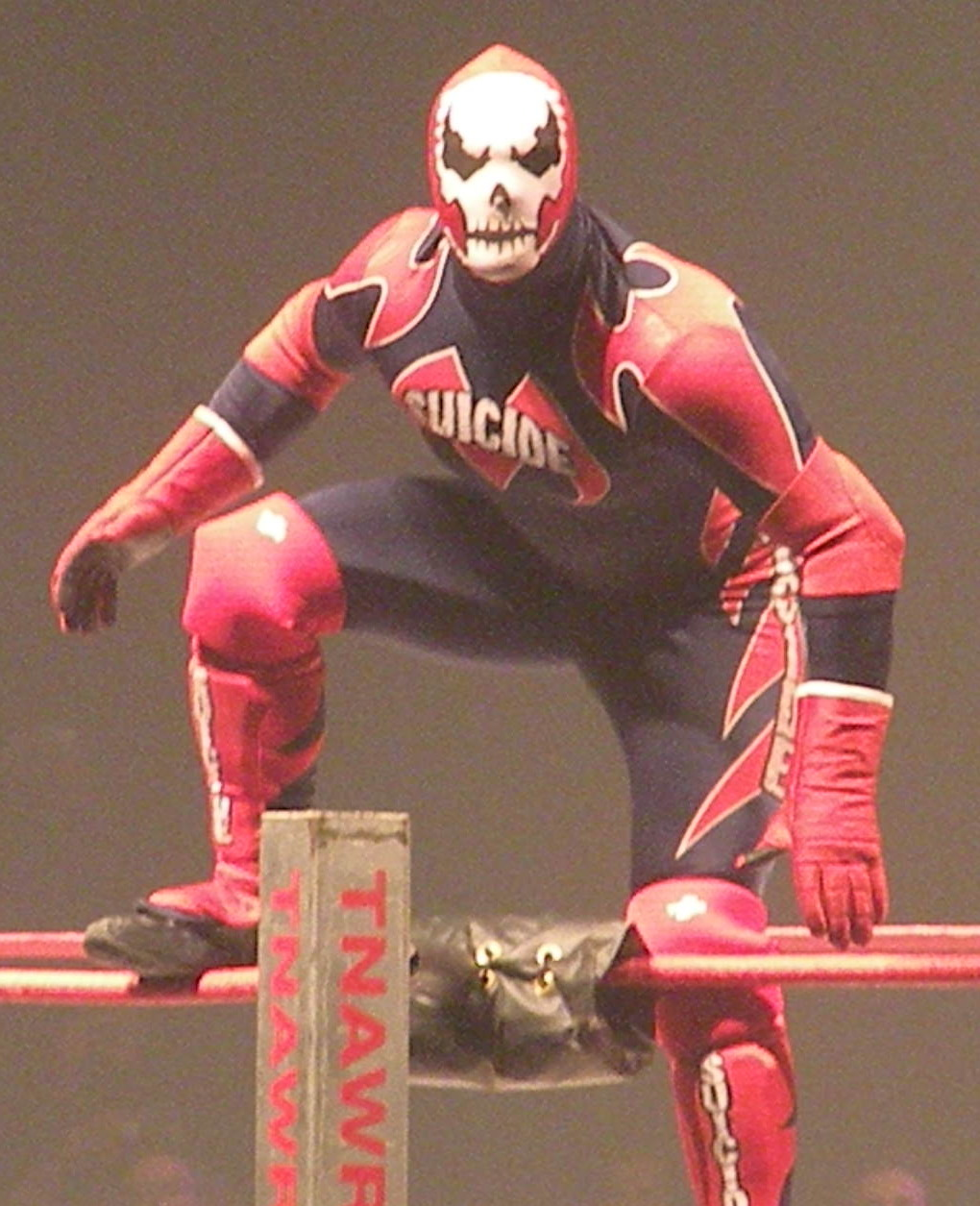
Kazarian as Suicide in January 2010

In late 2008 Kazarian made his return to TNA Wrestling as a masked wrestler named Suicide, who was featured in Midway's TNA Impact! video game. He debuted at Final Resolution in December 2008 as a face, swinging to the ring on a cable, attacking the Motor City Machine Guns. At Destination X Suicide won the TNA X Division Championship, in his debut match, in the Ultimate X match. Because of an injury to Kazarian, Suicide was portrayed for several weeks by Christopher Daniels, who was in the costume when the character won the X Division Championship. Afterwards, Daniels began feuding with the Motor City Machineguns of Alex Shelley and Chris Sabin, who on the April 30 episode of Impact! accused him of being Suicide. On the May 7 episode of Impact!, Jay Lethal and Consequences Creed joined the accusations by also accusing Daniels of being Suicide. On the May 14 episode of Impact! the Motor City Machineguns and Lethal Consequences were trying to unmask Suicide in an attempt to prove that they were right about his true identity, but Daniels made the save and helped Suicide clear the ring of Shelley, Sabin, Lethal, and Creed. At Slammiversary, Suicide retained the TNA X Division Championship against Shelley, Sabin, Lethal, and Creed, in a King of the Mountain match. On the July 16 episode of Impact! Suicide lost his X Division title to Homicide after he cashed in his "Feast or Fired" briefcase.

After not being seen for a few weeks, Suicide made his return at Hard Justice to compete in the Steel Asylum match, which he lost because of D'Angelo Dinero. On the August 20 episode of Impact! Suicide attacked Dinero after his match with Consequences Creed sparking a feud between the two. On the September 17 episode of Impact! Dinero defeated Suicide in a grudge match. At No Surrender Dinero defeated Suicide again, this time in a Falls Count Anywhere match. The following week on Impact! Suicide finally defeated Dinero, by pinning him in a street fight. On the October 15 episode of Impact! Homicide stole Suicide's costume and claimed to now know his true identity. On the December 3 episode Impact! Suicide made peace with Dinero and joined him, Matt Morgan and Hernandez in their war with Rhino, Team 3D and Jesse Neal. At Final Resolution Morgan, Hernandez, Dinero and Suicide defeated Neal, Team 3D and Rhino in an eight-man elimination tag team match. On the February 11, 2010, episode of Impact! Gerdelman made his final TV appearance as Suicide, losing to Matt Morgan in an 8 Card Stud Tournament qualifying match.

==== Fortune (2010–2012) ====
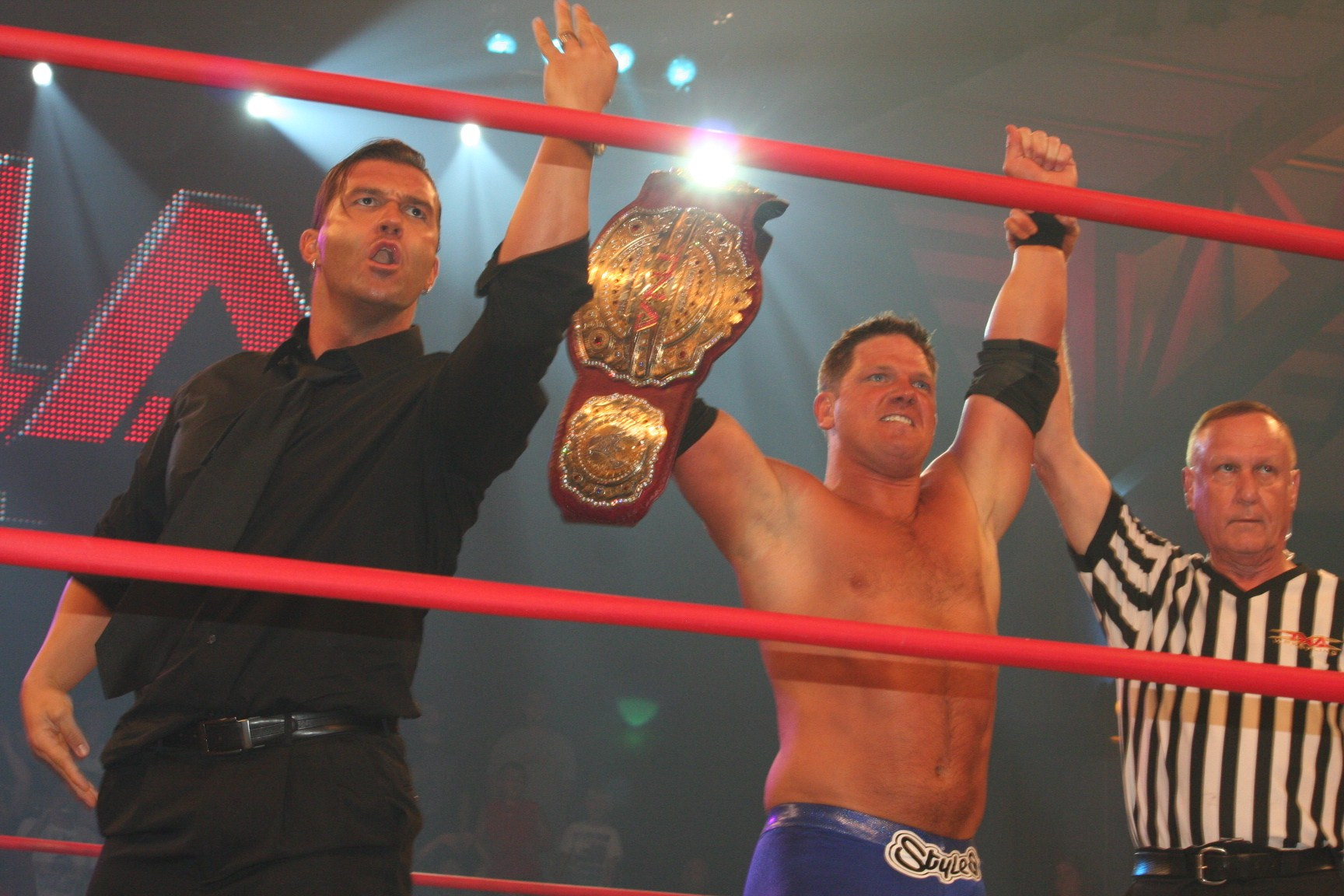
Kazarian celebrating with A.J. Styles in July 2010

On the February 18, 2010, episode of Impact!, Gerdelman made his return as Kazarian, teaming up with Amazing Red and Generation Me (Jeremy Buck and Max Buck) in an eight-man tag team match, where they defeated X Division Champion Doug Williams, Brian Kendrick and the Motor City Machineguns, after Kazarian pinned Williams. The following week he defeated Kendrick to earn himself a match for the X Division Championship at Destination X. However, instead of waiting for the pay-per-view, Kazarian was given his title shot on the March 8 Monday night episode of Impact in a three-way match, which also included Daniels. In the end Williams was able to retain his title by pinning Daniels. At Destination X Kazarian defeated Daniels, Kendrick and Amazing Red in a four-way ladder match to earn another shot at the X Division Championship. At Lockdown Kazarian defeated Homicide and Shannon Moore in a three-way steel cage match to win the vacant TNA X Division Championship for the fourth time (counting his reign as Suicide), after Douglas Williams was stripped of the title due to being unable to attend the event. Upon Williams' return to TNA two weeks later, he refused to hand the X Division Championship belt over to Kazarian, unless he was able to defeat him for it. At Sacrifice Kazarian lost the X Division Championship to Williams without ever actually holding the physical belt.

On the following episode of Impact! Kazarian started showing signs of a heel turn, when he won an X Division battle royal to earn spot number ten in the TNA rankings for a World Title shot, impressing Ric Flair in the process. The heel turn was completed the following week, when Flair interfered in his match with Jay Lethal, which led to Kazarian scoring the roll-up victory, while grabbing a hold of his opponent's tights. After the match, Flair's other associate A.J. Styles, trying to impress his mentor, attacked Lethal, which led to an argument between him and Kazarian, who wanted to finish Lethal off himself. The distraction was enough for Lethal to dropkick both of them out of the ring. At Slammiversary VIII Kazarian lost his spot in the rankings to Kurt Angle.

On the following episode of Impact! Ric Flair, who had aligned himself with Kazarian, Styles, Desmond Wolfe, Robert Roode and James Storm, announced that he would reform the Four Horsemen under the new name Fourtune, stating that each of them would have to earn their spots in the group and in order for Kazarian to earn his spot, he needed to become the Barry Windham of the group. Flair, wanting peace between Kazarian and Styles, booked them in a tag team match against Samoa Joe and Rob Terry at Victory Road. The plan seemed to work as Kazarian and Styles were victorious due to outside interference from Desmond Wolfe and in the process earned themselves spots in Fourtune. On the July 22 episode of Impact! Kazarian helped Styles defeat Rob Terry to win the TNA Global Championship. The following week Fourtune's lineup was seemingly completed with the addition of Robert Roode and James Storm as the final two members of the group. However, on the August 12 episode of Impact! Douglas Williams and Matt Morgan were added to Fourtune, as the stable attacked EV 2.0, a stable consisting of former Extreme Championship Wrestling performers. In the weeks leading to Bound for Glory, the stable's name was tweaked to Fortune to represent the expansion in the number of members in the group. At Bound for Glory Kazarian, Styles, Morgan, Roode and Storm were defeated in a Lethal Lockdown match by EV 2.0 members Tommy Dreamer, Raven, Rhino, Sabu and Stevie Richards. On the following episode of Impact! Fortune formed an alliance with Hulk Hogan's and Eric Bischoff's new stable, Immortal. The following week Kazarian was given the objective of ending Mr. Anderson's World Heavyweight title aspirations in an Ultimate X match. Though Kazarian managed to win the match, with help from Fortune, Anderson survived and thus earned himself a title match against Immortal's Jeff Hardy. The following week tensions rose between former rivals and Fortune stable mates Kazarian and Douglas Williams, when Williams claimed he had not been given a chance to spotlight his talent, after joining Fortune, while Kazarian claimed Williams had a bad attitude and dubbed himself, Styles, Roode and Storm the "Core Four" of Fortune. On the November 4 episode of Impact!, Flair ordered Kazarian and Williams to settle their differences in the ring. Kazarian won the match between the members of Fortune, after a miscommunication between Williams and James Storm. After the match Flair made Kazarian and Williams shake hands. At Turning Point the seemingly re–united Fortune defeated EV 2.0 in a ten-man tag team match and, as a result, EV 2.0's Sabu was released from TNA. However, on the November 18 episode of Impact! Williams turned on Fortune and joined Matt Morgan, who had been kicked out of the group the previous month, reigniting the feud between Kazarian and Williams. This was followed by Williams scoring back–to–back pinfall victories over Kazarian, first in an eight-man elimination tag team match on the November 25 episode of Impact! and then in a singles match on the December 2 episode of Impact!. On the December 23 episode of Impact! Kazarian defeated Jeremy Buck, Max Buck and Robbie E in a four-way match to become the number one contender to the X Division Championship, held by Jay Lethal. On January 9, 2011, at Genesis Kazarian defeated Lethal to win the X Division Championship for the fifth time.

On January 31 at the tapings of the February 3 episode of Impact!, Fortune turned face by attacking Immortal, when they interfered in a TNA World Heavyweight Championship match between Mr. Anderson and Jeff Hardy. Ric Flair, who did not take part in Fortune's turn due to being out with a torn rotator cuff, returned at the February 14 tapings of the February 17 episode of Impact!, turning on Fortune and jumping to Immortal. On March 13 at Victory Road, Kazarian successfully defended the X Division Championship in an Ultimate X match against Jeremy Buck, Max Buck and Robbie E. On April 17 at Lockdown, Kazarian, Roode, Storm and Christopher Daniels, who replaced an injured A.J. Styles, defeated Immortal representatives Ric Flair, Abyss, Bully Ray and Matt Hardy in a Lethal Lockdown match. On May 16 at the tapings of the May 19 episode of Impact Wrestling, Kazarian lost the X Division Championship to Abyss. On June 12 at Slammiversary IX, Kazarian failed to regain the title from Abyss in a three-way match with Brian Kendrick. In September, Kazarian began feuding with Jeff Jarrett over his and his wife Karen's treatment of her newly appointed assistant, Traci Brooks. In late 2011, Fortune disbanded, after both Christopher Daniels and Bobby Roode turned on their stablemates.

==== Bad Influence (2012–2014) ====
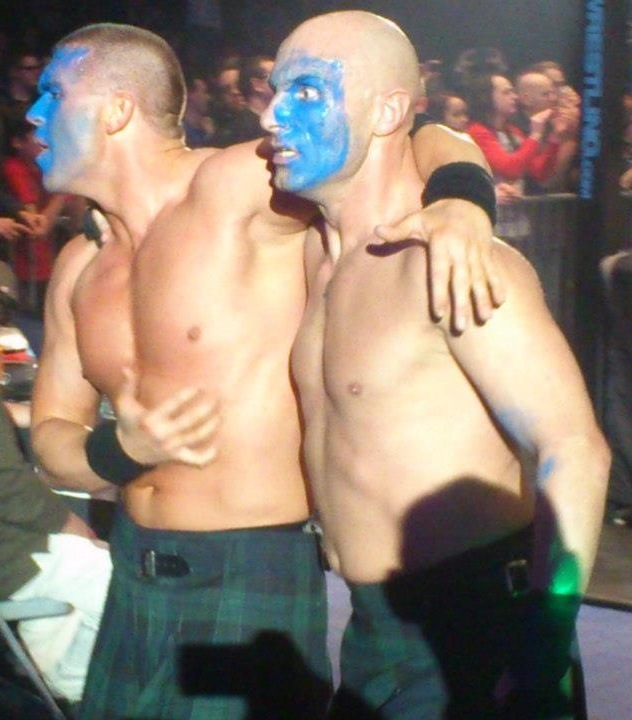
Daniels and Kazarian, dressed as "Braveheart", mocking fans in Scotland

On the January 5, 2012, episode of Impact Wrestling, Kazarian and A.J. Styles were defeated in the finals of the Wild Card Tournament by the team of Magnus and Samoa Joe, when Kazarian abandoned Styles and left the ringside area with Christopher Daniels, turning heel in the process. Over the next few weeks it became apparent that Daniels was holding something over Kazarian, with Kazarian being reluctant to do his bidding. On February 12 at Against All Odds, Kazarian defeated Styles in a singles match. On the February 23 episode of Impact Wrestling, Kazarian attacked Styles during his Television Championship match with Robbie E, allowing Robbie to retain the championship. On the following episode of Impact Wrestling, Kazarian defeated Styles in a gauntlet match; had Styles been successful, Kazarian would have to explain his alliance with Daniels. On March 18 at Victory Road, Kazarian and Daniels were defeated in a tag team match by Styles and Mr. Anderson. The rivalry continued on April 15 at Lockdown, where the two duos were on opposing teams in the annual Lethal Lockdown match. Styles' and Anderson's team, led by Garett Bischoff, ended up defeating Kazarian's and Daniels' team, led by Eric Bischoff. During Styles' absence from Impact Wrestling, Kazarian and Daniels set their sights on the TNA World Tag Team Championship, attacking champions Magnus and Samoa Joe on the April 26 episode. On the May 10 episode of Impact Wrestling, Kazarian revealed that he originally aligned himself with Daniels to keep him from revealing Styles' secret, but changed his mind after learning what the secret was. Daniels then revealed the secret, a series of photographs insinuating a relationship between Styles and TNA president Dixie Carter. Three days later at Sacrifice, Kazarian and Daniels defeated Magnus and Samoa Joe to win the TNA World Tag Team Championship, starting Kazarian's second reign with the title. Later in the event, Kazarian and Daniels cost A.J. Styles his match with Kurt Angle, who afterwards turned on the two, saving Styles from a beatdown. On June 10 at Slammiversary, Kazarian and Daniels lost the TNA World Tag Team Championship to Styles and Angle. On the June 21 episode of Impact Wrestling, Styles and Carter proved that Kazarian and Daniels had been lying about their relationship by producing a pregnant woman named Claire Lynch, whom they had been helping overcome her addictions. The following week, Kazarian teased dissension with Daniels, claiming that he had been lied to. However, in the main event of the evening, Kazarian revealed that he was still on Daniels' side, when the two defeated Styles and Angle, after Kazarian hit Styles with a steel chair, to regain the TNA World Tag Team Championship. Following the win, Daniels admitted that Styles and Carter had told the truth about Claire, but claimed that they had left out the part about Styles being the father of her unborn baby. The team, billed as "The World Tag Team Champions of the World", made their first televised title defense on the August 8 episode of Impact Wrestling, defeating Devon and Garett Bischoff. Three days later at Hardcore Justice, Kazarian unsuccessfully challenged Devon for the TNA Television Championship. On the August 23 episode of Impact Wrestling, the storyline involving Claire Lynch was concluded, when she revealed that she was not pregnant after all, while also revealing Daniels' and Kazarian's plot to blackmail Styles through her fake pregnancy. On September 6 as part of the first "Championship Thursday", Kazarian and Daniels successfully defended the TNA World Tag Team Championship against Chavo Guerrero Jr. and Hernandez. Three days later at No Surrender, Kazarian and Daniels made another successful title defense against previous champions, A.J. Styles and Kurt Angle. On October 14 at Bound for Glory, Kazarian and Daniels lost the TNA World Tag Team Championship to Chavo Guerrero Jr. and Hernandez in a three-way match, which also included A.J. Styles and Kurt Angle. Kazarian and Daniels received their rematch on November 11 at Turning Point, but were again defeated by Guerrero and Hernandez.

On December 9 at Final Resolution, Kazarian was defeated by James Storm in a singles match, and again on the January 3, 2013, episode of Impact Wrestling, beginning a rivalry between the newly christened Bad Influence and Storm. On March 10 at Lockdown, Bad Influence unsuccessfully challenged Austin Aries and Bobby Roode for the TNA World Tag Team Championship in a three-way match, also involving Chavo Guerrero Jr. and Hernandez. In April, Kazarian and Daniels began teasing a Fortune reunion to battle the Aces & Eights stable, however, this plan was foiled by A.J. Styles and Bobby Roode both turning down offers to join them. Bad Influence faced Austin Aries and Bobby Roode in a number one contenders match on the May 9 episode of Impact Wrestling, however, the match ended in a no contest after special guest referee James Storm superkicked Aries and Daniels and walked out on the match. On June 2 at Slammiversary XI, Bad Influence failed to capture the TNA World Tag Team Championship from Chavo Guerrero Jr. and Hernandez in a fatal four-way elimination match, which also included Austin Aries and Bobby Roode and was won by Gunner and James Storm. On the June 13 episode of Impact Wrestling, Kazarian and Daniels defeated Gunner and Storm in a non-title match to qualify for the 2013 Bound for Glory Series. Kazarian would begin the BFG series by losing to the likes of Magnus and A.J. Styles. On the July 11 episode of Impact Wrestling, Kazarian and Bobby Roode defeated Austin Aries and Christopher Daniels in a tag team match, with Kazarian pinning his Bad Influence partner for the win, to qualify for the BFG series gauntlet match later in the evening. During the match, however, Kazarian was the first man eliminated by A.J. Styles. On the August 8 episode of Impact Wrestling, Kazarian and Daniels faced off in a BFG series match, but despite teasing tension earlier in the night, got themselves intentionally counted out to gain two points in the tournament. Afterwards, Kazarian and Daniels allied themselves with Bobby Roode to form a new force, and so that one of them would win the Bound for Glory series. The following week at Impact Wrestling: Hardcore Justice, Kazarian defeated A.J. Styles, Austin Aries, and Jeff Hardy in a ladder match, following interference from Daniels and Roode, to capture twenty points in the BFG Series. On the August 8 Impact Wrestling, Daniels and Kazarian faced off in a BFG series match. Despite teasing tension earlier in the night, they both intentionally got counted out to gain two points each. Afterward, they allied with Bobby Roode, in hopes it would help one of them win the tournament.

At the Bound for Glory pre-show, Bad Influence were defeated by the tag team of Eric Young and Joseph Park in a tag team gauntlet match to determine the number one contenders to face the TNA World Tag Team Champions, James Storm and Gunner, during the Bound For Glory PPV later that night. Following their elimination, Bad Influence attacked Park causing him to bleed from the mouth. The same night, during the PPV, Bad Influence interrupted the show to petition TNA management to place themselves into the TNA World Tag Team Championship match later that night between James Storm & Gunner and challengers The BroMans. However, before they got an answer Abyss appeared and attacked them. Over the following few weeks, Bad Influence would mock Park and try to reveal his true identity. On the November 5 edition of Impact Wrestling, Bad Influence revealed that Park's law firm (Park, Park & Park) had closed 15 years ago and consequently Park had been lying about being a lawyer. On December 12, Bad Influence were defeated by Park & Young when Young caused his own partner to bleed resulting in Park transforming into Abyss, as a result of seeing his own blood, and gaining the victory. On December 26, Bad Influence were defeated again by Park in a Monster's Ball Handicap match. On March 2, 2014, Bad Influence were part of a group of TNA wrestlers that took part in Wrestle-1's Kaisen: Outbreak event in Tokyo, Japan, defeating Junior Stars (Koji Kanemoto and Minoru Tanaka) in a tag team match. On March 9, 2014, at TNA Lockdown, Bad Influence along with Chris Sabin were defeated by Wrestle-1's The Great Muta, Sanada, and Yasu in a six-man interpromotional tag team steel cage match. On April 12, 2014, at TNA One Night Only's X-Travaganza 2 event Bad Influence were defeated by The Wolves (Eddie Edwards and Davey Richards) in the EC3 Invitational Ladder match where the winners received $25,000. On April 23 Daniels announced his departure from TNA thus dissolving the team. On May 11, it was reported that Kazarian had also worked the final dates of his contract with TNA.

While Bad Influence were in TNA, they appeared in other promotions. On January 24, 2014, Bad Influence appeared at Big Time Wrestling's Battle Royal, where they defeated The Ballard Brothers (Shane Ballard andShannon Ballard). On April 5, Bad Influence appeared in two events. First, they defeated The Bravado Brothers (Harlem Bravado & Lancelot Bravado) at Dragon Gate USA's Mercury Rising. After, they defeated The Irish Airborne (Dave Crist and Jake Crist) at WrestleCon. On June 6, 2014, Bad Influence made their debuts in Tommy Dreamer's House of Hardcore, defeating Outlaw Inc. (Eddie Kingston and Homicide). On June 7, 2014, Bad Influence returned to House of Hardcore at HOH 5, defeating Petey Williams and Tony Nese. In November and December 2015, The Addiction took part in New Japan Pro-Wrestling's 2015 World Tag League, where they finished with a record of three wins and three losses, failing to advance from their block.

=== Ring of Honor (2014–2018) ===
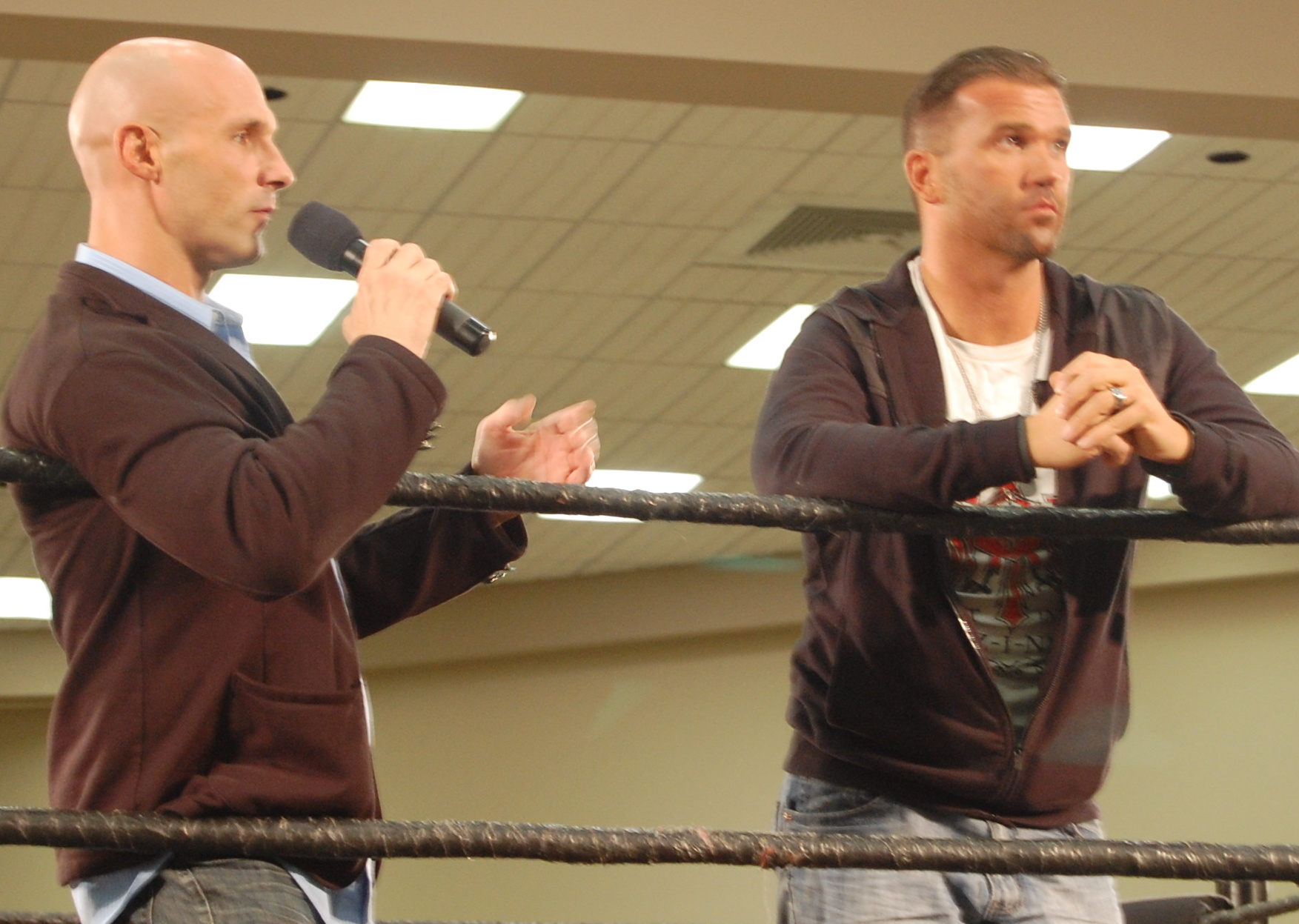
Daniels and Kazarian, known as The Addiction, answering fan questions in San Antonio, Texas, immediately prior to Glory By Honor XIII

After his TNA contract expired on June 1, 2014, Kazarian was announced to debut in Ring of Honor. at Best in the World, Kazarian made his ROH debut, teaming with Christopher Daniels to challenge reDRagon (Bobby Fish and Kyle O'Reilly) for the ROH World Tag Team Championship in a losing effort. At Supercard of Honor IX Kazarian was defeated by Michael Elgin. On April 25, 2015, The Addiction defeated reDRagon to win the ROH World Tag Team Championship with the help from Chris Sabin. At Field of Honor Kazarian was involved in a nine-way gauntlet match for an ROH World Television Championship shot, which was won by Takaaki Watanabe. At All Star Extravaganza VII The Addiction lost the ROH World Tag Team Championship to The Kingdom in a triple threat tag team match involving The Young Bucks. At Survival of the Fittest Kazarian was involved in a Survival of the Fittest tournament match which was won by Jay Briscoe also Raymond Rowe and Rhett Titus was in the match.

On May 9, 2016, at War of the Worlds, The Addiction defeated War Machine to win the ROH World Tag Team Championship for the second time. At Death Before Dishonor XIV The Addiction defeated Los Ingobernables de Japón and Hiroshi Tanahashi and Michael Elgin in a Three-way Tag team match for the ROH World Tag Team Championship. On September 30 at All Star Extravaganza VIII, The Addiction lost the ROH World Tag Team Championship to The Young Bucks in a three-way ladder match, which also included The Motor City Machine Guns. Kazarian would face and was defeated by Jay Lethal and Kyle O'Reilly.

In early 2017, The Addiction began feuding with Bullet Club, turning face in the process. On February 11, 2017, during Ring of Honor tapings, Kazarian turned on Daniels and joined Bullet Club. On March 10 at the ROH 15th Anniversary Show Kazarian defeated Cheeseburger, Chris Sabin, Punisher Martinez, Hangman Page and Silas Young in a six-man mayhem match number one contender for the ROH World Television Championship. Later that same event, Kazarian turned on Adam Cole and Bullet Club, revealing his betrayal of Daniels to have been a ruse and helping Daniels win the ROH World Championship. On ROH TV taping Kazarian was unsuccessful at winning the ROH World Television Championship against Marty Scurll. During the match Hangman Page got involved and caused distractions and ended up hitting Kaz with a chair. After the match, Matt Sydal made his return to lay out Scurll and even the odds.

On the Ring of Honor Tapings, Kazarian would win the Honor Rumble last eliminated Jay Lethal. Later that night, Kazarian was unsuccessful at winning the ROH World Championship against Cody. On March 9, 2018, at ROH 16th Anniversary Show, SoCal Uncensored defeated The Mung Bucks to win the ROH World Six-Man Tag Team Championship. At War of the Worlds: Lowell, they lost the Six-Man Tag Team Title against The Kingdom.

On October 14, 2018, Kazarian and SoCal Uncensored teammate Scorpio Sky won a triple threat tag team match to become ROH World Tag Team Champions, marking Kazarian's third reign with those titles. At Final Battle, they lost the Tag Team title against The Briscoe Brothers in a Ladder War. The next day, SoCal Uncensored left ROH.

=== All Elite Wrestling (2019–2023) ===
==== SoCal Uncensored (2019–2021) ====
In January 2019 it was revealed that Kazarian would be one of the first signees to All Elite Wrestling, a new wrestling promotion started by wrestlers Cody Rhodes and The Young Bucks. SCU made their debut at Double or Nothing defeating Strong Hearts (CIMA, El Lindaman, and T-Hawk) in a six-man tag team match. On the October 30th 2019 episode of AEW Dynamite, Kazarian and SoCal Uncensored teammate Scorpio Sky became the inaugural All Elite Wrestling Tag Team Champions. Kazarian and Sky would lose the Tag Team Championship to Kenny Omega and "Hangman" Adam Page at Chris Jericho's Rock 'N' Wrestling Rager at Sea Part Deux: Second Wave. Following this, SCU would start a feud with The Dark Order. On the March 18, 2020 episode of Dynamite (first show with no crowd), Kazarian and Daniels would be attacked by The Exalted One of The Dark Order, Brodie Lee. Kazarian then returned to teaming with his longtime tag team partner Christopher Daniels, as Scorpio Sky would distance himself from SCU. Kazarian would also try out singles competition for himself, facing and losing to Jon Moxley on the May 6, 2020 episode of Dynamite. On the September 30 episode of Dynamite, Kazarian and Scorpio Sky would team once again, losing to FTR for the AEW World Tag Team Championships. On December 2, 2020, at Winter is Coming, Kazarian would lose to Jericho in a singles match. At AEW Blood and Guts, Kazarian and Daniels would defeat The Varisity Blondes (Brian Pillman Jr. and Griff Garrison), The Acclaimed (Anthony Bowens and Max Caster), and Jurassic Express (Jungle Boy and Luchasaurus) to earn a shot at the AEW World Tag Team Championships. On May 14, 2021, Kazarian and Daniels failed to defeat The Young Bucks for the titles, thus forcing the team to disband.

==== The Elite Hunter (2021–2022) ====
In June 2021, Kazarian returned and began attacking members of The Elite, aiding Eddie Kingston, Pac, and Penta el Zero M. He would label himself as ‘The Elite Hunter’ and over the upcoming weeks he would attack members of The Elite usually when they attempted to cheat in matches. This would lead to match on Fyter Fest (Night 2), where Kazarian would lose to Elite member Doc Gallows. In 2022, Kazarian engaged in a feud with his former tag team partner Scorpio Sky over the TNT Championship, which led to Sky turning on Kazarian by hitting him with the TNT Championship belt after defeating him on the May 13, 2022 episode of AEW Rampage. At Double or Nothing on May 29, 2022, Sky, Paige Van Zant and Ethan Page defeated Kazarian, Sammy Guevara and Tay Conti in a six-person tag team match after Sky pinned Kazarian, with Kazarian and Guevara losing the right to further challenge Sky for the TNT Championship as a result. At the Impact Wrestling Hard to Kill pay-per-view, Kazarian cut a promo saying he was done with AEW and he had signed a contract with Impact Wrestling. Reportedly, Kazarian had asked for his release from AEW in November, and it was later granted. His last match for the promotion took place on the December 26, 2022 episode of AEW Dark: Elevation, losing to Konosuke Takeshita. It was noted that Kazarian was well liked by AEW officials and fellow talent, and that he "did business the right way" by losing to Takeshita before leaving. Sources also stated that Kazarian would be welcomed back to AEW if he chose to return in the future.

=== Second return to TNA Wrestling (2021–present) ===
On the July 29, 2021 episode of Impact!, Kazarian made his return to TNA, now known as Impact Wrestling, attacking The Elite (Kenny Omega, Doc Gallows, and Karl Anderson). The following week on Impact!, Kazarian teamed with Eddie Edwards and Sami Callihan to defeat The Elite. In May 2022, he would make another appearance, wrestling Chris Sabin. Kazarian would later return at Victory Road as part of the X Division Triple Threat Revolver match to determine the number 1 contender for Mike Bailey's title at the Bound For Glory pay-per-view. Kazarian would defeat Bailey to win the X-Division Championship for the fifth time in his career. On the October 20, 2022 episode of IMPACT, Kazarian announced that he was going to invoke Option C and vacated the X Division Championship in exchange for an opportunity to wrestle Josh Alexander for the Impact World Championship, though he was defeated. At Hard To Kill, Kazarian made his first appearance since losing to Alexander, cutting a promo saying he is officially signed to Impact.

On March 24 at Sacrifice, Kazarian teamed with Rich Swann and Steve Maclin losing to Time Machine (Alex Shelley, Chris Sabin, and Kushida). On April 16, at Rebellion, Kazarian fought for Team Dreamer and won a 10-wrestler Hardcore War against Team Bully. On June 9 at Against All Odds, Kazarian defeated Eddie Edwards. On July 15 at Slammiversary, Kazarian was defeated by Eddie Edwards. On August 27 at Emergence, Kazarian was defeated by Eddie Edwards again but this time in a "Back to School" match.

On January 13, 2024 at the "Countdown to TNA Hard to Kill", Kazarian teamed with Eric Young losing to The System (Eddie Edwards and Brian Myers). On January 18 episode of TNA Wrestling, Kazarian and Young was defeated by the Grizzled Young Veterans (James Drake & Zack Gibson). Following the match, Kazarian turned heel by attacking Young, exclaiming that 2024 was to be "his year". Two weeks later, Kazarian explained his actions in the ring, saying he saved TNA when he resigned in 2023, but after a career of simply being a "soldier" for the promotion, he vowed to be remembered as a "king," which is what he called Young. On February 23 at No Surrender, Kazarian was defeated by Young, Kazarian later attacking the referee in anger. TNA Director of Authority Santino Marella would suspend Kazarian for his actions. Kazarian, however, continued to target Young, costing him his world title match against Moose at Sacrifice. On April at Rebellion, Kazarian defeated Young in a Full Metal Mayhem match.

At Bound for Glory in October 2024, Kazarian won the 20-person Intergender Call Your Shot Gauntlet and earned a championship match of his choosing up to one year. Over the next few months, Kazarian made several unsuccessful attempts to call his shot, most notably at Genesis where Joe Hendry defeated Nic Nemeth to win the title. At Rebellion, Kazarian failed to win the TNA World Championship from Hendry, this was a triple threat match with NXT's Ethan Page. At Victory Road, Kazarian would defeat Steve Maclin to win the TNA International Championship for the first time. However, he would lose the title back to Maclin on October 12 at Bound for Glory, ending his reign at 16 days. Later that night, Kazarian attacked Jody Threat and took her spot in the Call Your Shot Gauntlet, winning the match alongside Nic Nemeth, becoming the first wrestler to win back-to-back Call Your Shot Gauntlets. On the November 13, 2025 episode of Impact!, Kazarian cashed in his Call Your Shot Gauntlet, defeating TNA World Champion Mike Santana to win the title for the first time. This victory made him a TNA Grand Slam winner. On December 5 at Final Resolution, Kazarian made his first successful title defense against JDC. On January 15, 2026 on Thursday Night Impact!'s AMC debut, Kazarian lost the TNA World Championship to Mike Santana ending his reign at 63 days.

== Personal life ==
Gerdelman became a fan of wrestling due in large part to Hulk Hogan's role in Rocky III and also watching WrestleMania I. His favorite wrestler was Ultimate Warrior, followed by Shawn Michaels, Ricky Steamboat, Tito Santana and The British Bulldogs.

Gerdelman married fellow professional wrestler Tracy Brookshaw on January 7, 2010. The couple have a son together. Gerdelman is known to be a massive fan of the heavy metal band Metallica. He plays bass guitar and is in a band called VexTemper.

== Other media ==
Kazarian made a cameo appearance on an episode of The Man Show where Jimmy Kimmel and Adam Carolla learned how to wrestle. He also appeared in the film Backyard Dogs in 2000 as "Snake Duggan" and was on an episode of Distraction with Curry Man and Samoa Joe. Kazarian was also referenced in Mike Vallely's documentary, Mike V's Greatest Hits, in which one part of it involved the pro skater spending part of his time as a wrestler. He also made a cameo appearance in MTV's Made when The Motor City Machine Guns were making a Michigan choir boy into a professional wrestler.

He is also the bass guitarist of the band VexTemper, whose song "Get Addicted" was used as his and Christopher Daniels' entrance theme in ROH.

== Championships and accomplishments ==
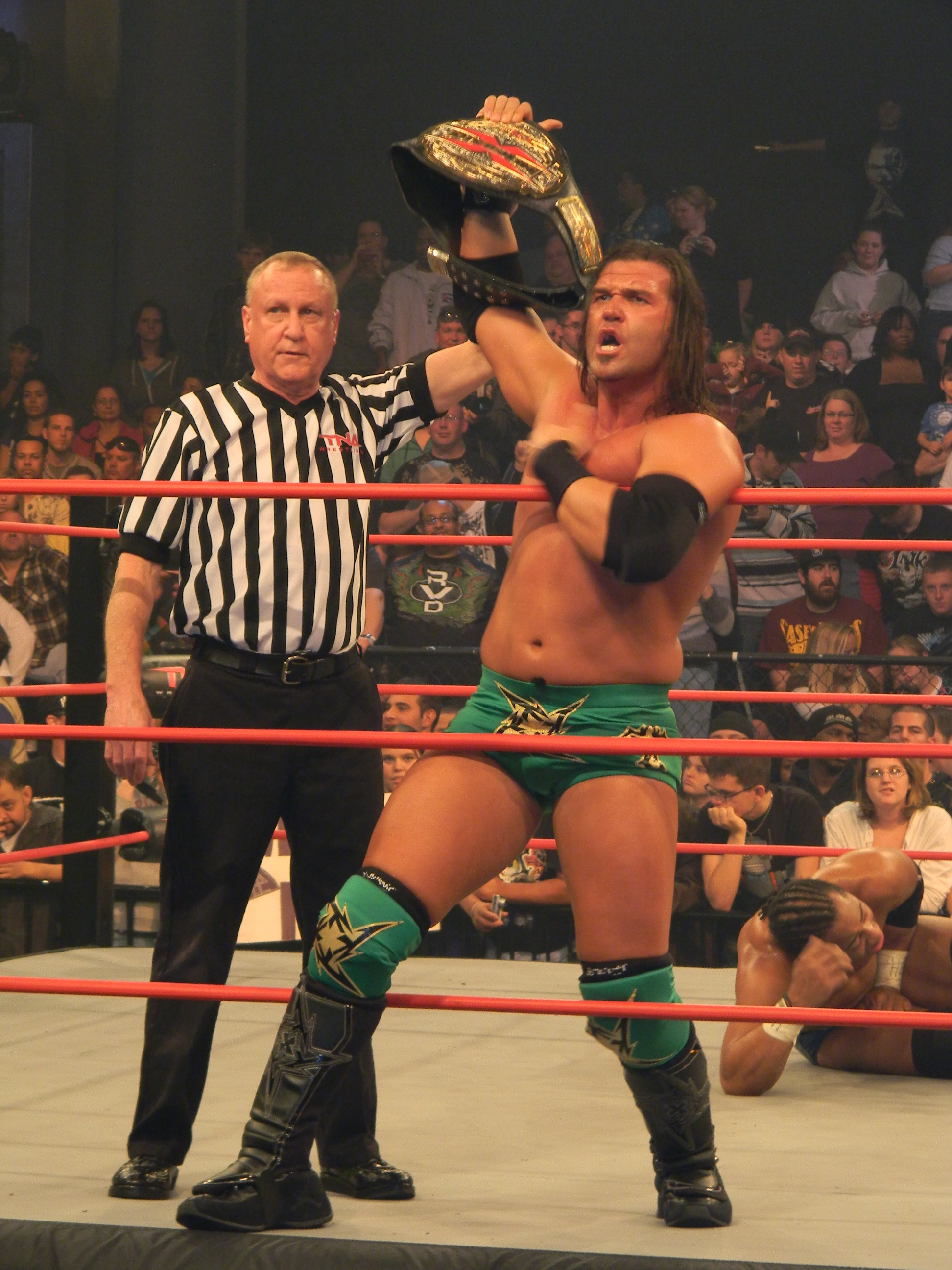
Kazarian is a six-time TNA X Division Champion...

- All Elite Wrestling
  - AEW World Tag Team Championship (1 time, inaugural) – with Scorpio Sky
  - AEW World Tag Team Championship Tournament (2019)
- Bar Wrestling
  - Trios Tournament (2019) - with Christopher Daniels and Scorpio Sky
- Big Time Wrestling
  - BTW Tag Team Championship (1 time) – with Jason Styles
- California Wrestling Coalition
  - CWC Heavyweight Championship (1 time)
  - CWC Tag Team Championship (1 time) – with Iron Eagle
- Cauliflower Alley Club
  - Future Legends Award (2005)
- DDT Pro-Wrestling
  - Ironman Heavymetalweight Championship (1 time) – with Christopher Daniels
- East Coast Wrestling Alliance
  - ECWA Tag Team Championship (1 time) – with Nova
- Empire Wrestling Federation
  - EWF Heavyweight Championship (1 time)
  - EWF Tag Team Championship (1 time) – with Josh Galaxy
  - EWF Hall of Fame
- International Wrestling Coalition
  - IWC United States Championship (1 time)
- Jersey All Pro Wrestling
  - JAPW Light Heavyweight Championship (1 time)
  - JAPW New Jersey State Championship (1 time)
- Millennium Pro Wrestling
  - MPW Heavyweight Championship (1 time)
- Phoenix Championship Wrestling
  - PCW Television Championship (1 time)
  - PCW Tag Team Championship (1 time) – with Nova
- Primos Wrestling Canada
  - Primos Television Championship (1 time)
- Pro Wrestling Guerrilla
  - PWG World Championship (2 times, inaugural)
  - Bad Ass Mother 3000 (2003)
- Pro Wrestling Illustrated
  - Ranked No. 30 of the top 500 singles wrestlers in the PWI 500 in 2009
- Ring of Honor
  - ROH World Tag Team Championship (3 times) – with Christopher Daniels (2) and Scorpio Sky (1)
  - ROH World Six-Man Tag Team Championship (1 time) – with Christopher Daniels and Scorpio Sky
  - Honor Rumble (2017)
- Reaper Wrestling
  - Reaper King's Crown Championship (2 times, current)
- Rising Phoenix Wrestling
  - RPW Invitational Tournament (2006)
- Total Nonstop Action Wrestling / Impact Wrestling / NWA Total Nonstop Action
  - TNA World Championship (1 time)
  - Impact/TNA X Division Championship (6 times) (Note: Kazarian and Michael Shane were declared co-champions after defeating A.J. Styles in an Ultimate X match at the weekly pay-per-view #104 by grabbing the belt at the same time. This co-reign was the second time that both men had won the championship.)
  - TNA International Championship (1 time)
  - TNA World Tag Team Championship (3 times) – with Eric Young/Super Eric (1) and Christopher Daniels (2)
  - Sixth Grand Slam Champion
  - 11th Triple Crown Champion
  - Call Your Shot Gauntlet (2024, 2025, 2026)
  - Fight for the Right Tournament (2007)
  - TNA World Cup of Wrestling (2013) – with Christopher Daniels, James Storm, Kenny King and Mickie James
  - X Division King of the Mountain (2008, 2009 (Note: Won as Suicide.))
  - Match of the Year (2003) vs. Chris Sabin and Michael Shane, August 20, 2003
  - Memorable Moment of the Year (2003) The first Ultimate X match
- Ultimate Pro Wrestling
  - UPW Lightweight Championship (1 time)
  - UPW Tag Team Championship (1 time) – with Nova
  - UPW Tag Team Championship Tournament (2001) – with Nova
- United States Xtreme Wrestling
  - UXW Xtreme Championship (1 time)
- West Coast Wrestling Alliance
  - WCWA Heavyweight Championship (1 time)
- World Series Wrestling
  - WSW Tag Team Championship (1 time) – with Eric Young
- Wrestling Observer Newsletter
  - Tag Team of the Year (2012) with Christopher Daniels
  - Worst Worked Match of the Year (2006) TNA Reverse Battle Royal at TNA Impact!

== Notes ==
New championship	1st AEW World Tag Team Champion; October 30, 2019 – January 21, 2020; With: Scorpio Sky	Succeeded by Kenny Omega and Adam Page
