= Ryan Sakoda =

Japanese professional wrestler (1972–2021)

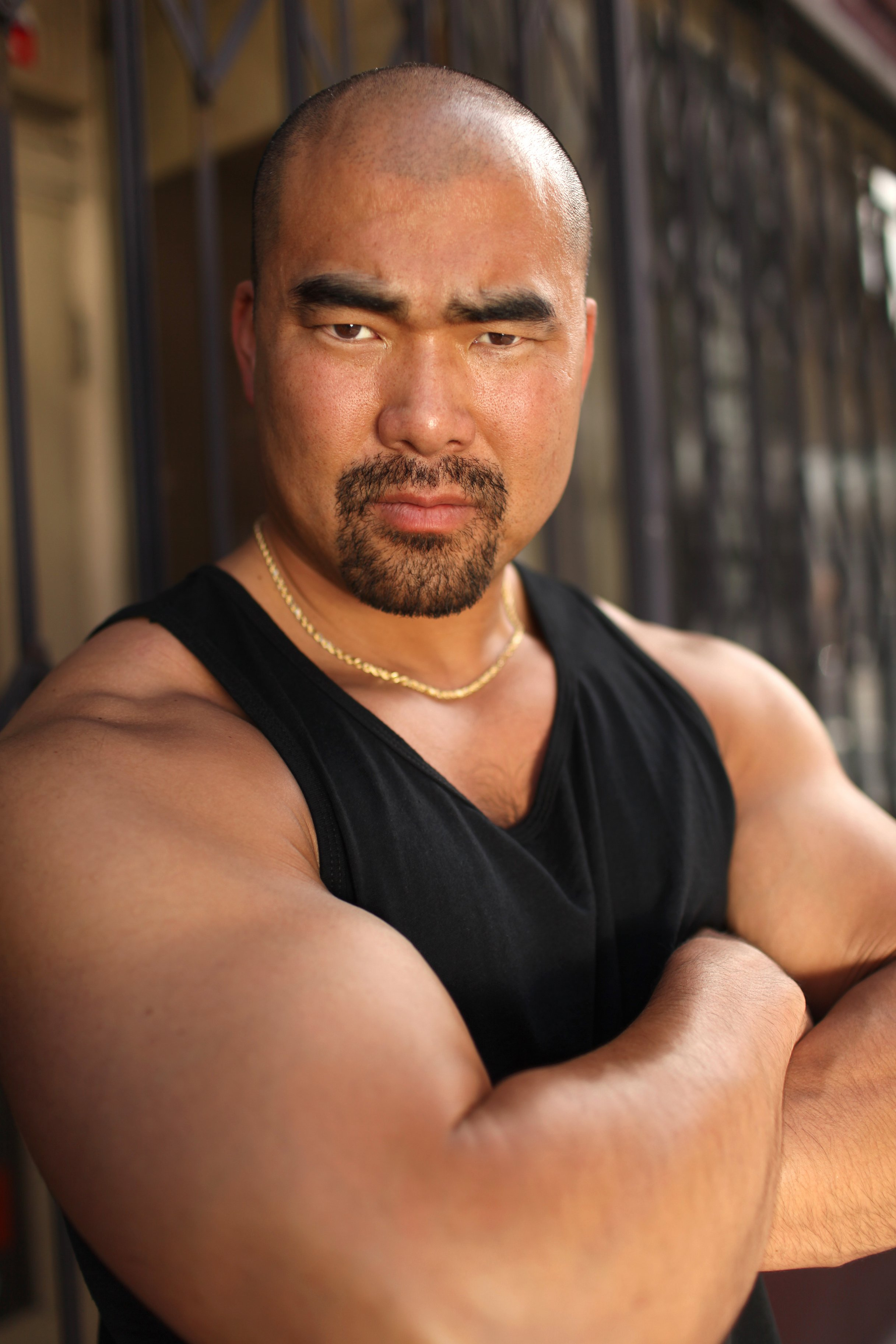
- Sakoda in 2010

Personal information
- Born: December 31, 1972 Tokyo, Japan
- Died: September 2, 2021 (aged 48) Hacienda Heights, California, U.S.

Professional wrestling career
- Ring name(s): Charlie Chan; Keiji Sakoda; Keiji Sakota; Quick Cook Lee; Ryan Sakoda; Ryu Sakoda; Sakoda; Vapor
- Billed height: 1.83 m (6 ft 0 in)
- Billed weight: 110 kg (243 lb)
- Billed from: Tokyo, Japan
- Trained by: Bill Anderson; Jesse Hernandez
- Debut: 1998
- Retired: 2007

Ryan Keiji Sakoda (December 31, 1972 – September 2, 2021) was a Japanese American professional wrestler. He was best known for his appearances in WWE and later Ultimate Pro Wrestling as a part-time trainer for the wrestlers, as well as working in the independents under his real name.

== Professional wrestling career ==
=== Early career (1998–2003) ===
Before coming to WWE, Sakoda had a successful stint in the NWA Zero-One promotion in Japan, stemming from his appearances for Ultimate Pro Wrestling. During this time Sakoda often filled in as an instructor at UPW's Ultimate University, while wrestling as part of the faction Team Emblem with Japanese superstars Masato Tanaka and Shinjiro Otani.

=== World Wrestling Entertainment (2003–2004) ===
On January 6, 2003, Sakoda made his first onscreen appearance for WWE on Raw as a judge for World Heavyweight Champion Triple H and Scott Steiner's pose down under the name Charlie Chan.

In September 2003, Sakoda was signed to a developmental contract, and it wouldn't be long before Sakoda was brought up to SmackDown!'s main roster. He, along with Akio, made their WWE debuts on October 19, 2003, at No Mercy. Sakoda aligned himself with Akio, forming the heel tag team Kyo Dai, the yakuza-style henchmen of Tajiri.

In August 2004, Sakoda was released from his WWE contract.

=== Return to independent circuit (2005–2007) ===
After WWE, Sakoda returned to UPW in March 2005 as a part-time trainer and part-time auto sales executive at Worthington Ford. He made his return to full-time in-ring competition in 2007 with MTV's Wrestling Society X. Wrestling as an independent in the local mall circuit until his death, Sakoda had been working as a server for Disney at one of their Grand California Hotel restaurants.

== Personal life ==
Sakoda filed a class action lawsuit against WWE, alleging that wrestlers sustained traumatic brain injuries while wrestling for them and that the company tried to conceal that information. The suit was litigated by attorney Konstantine Kyros, who has been involved in a number of other lawsuits against WWE. In March 2016, the suit was dismissed as frivolous by Judge Vanessa Lynne Bryant.

== Death ==
Sakoda died on September 2, 2021, at the age of 48. His death was not announced until September 27.

== Championships and accomplishments ==
- Empire Wrestling Federation
  - EWF Heavyweight Championship (1 time)
- Pro Wrestling Zero-One
  - NWA Intercontinental Tag Team Championship (1 time) (Note: After the title was vacated, Samoa Joe and partner Keiji Sakoda's reign was stricken from the promotion's records.) – with Samoa Joe

== See also ==
- List of premature professional wrestling deaths
