= Babi Slymm =

American professional wrestler

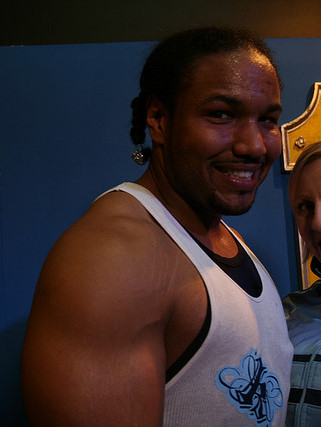

Personal information
- Born: Tony Drake; June 16, 1978 (age 48) Southeast San Diego, California, U.S.

Professional wrestling career
- Ring name(s): Babi Slymm; Tony Drake; Muscle Gang; Killa Kain; Bigg Tony; Saleem Jihad; Cyber Gang
- Billed height: 6 ft 2 in (1.88 m)
- Billed weight: 286 lb (130 kg) – 297 lb (135 kg)
- Billed from: "Southeast San Diego"
- Trained by: Adam Pearce; Luther Reigns; B-Boy; Joe Romano
- Debut: July 2001

Tony Drake is an American professional wrestler, best known for his appearances in the short-lived Wrestling Society X. He currently competes on the independent circuit using the ring name Babi Slymm.

== Professional wrestling career ==
A defensive tackle and competitor in discus and track at high school, Drake began to train as a wrestler at the invitation of a friend operating a small Californian wrestling promotion in Oakland. Drake has competed for numerous organisations in the California area, including Xtreme Pro Wrestling under the ring name Saleem Jihad, Ultimate Pro Wrestling, NWA Pro Wrestling and Pro Wrestling Guerrilla. Drake received his greatest exposure competing for MTV's Wrestling Society X, in which he formed a team with Ruckus named Keepin' It Gangsta.

On March 29, 2004, Drake won the inaugural AWS Championship when he defeated Adam Pearce at the Alternative Wrestling Show in City of Industry, California. Drake later feuded at AWS with both Al Katrazz and the Plague.

On January 26, 2007, Drake joined Naruki Doi's Muscle Outlaw'z faction in the Japanese Dragon Gate promotion. Using the name Cyber Gang, he became part of a tag team with fellow faction member Cyber Kong. The team was short-lived, however, as Kong soon left the Outlaw'z to join rival stable New Hazard. Drake remained in the Muscle Outlaw'z and subsequently changed his name to Muscle Gang for the remainder of his time in Dragon Gate.

== Championships and accomplishments ==
- Alternative Wrestling Show
  - AWS Heavyweight Championship (1 time)
- Revolution Pro Wrestling
  - RPW Mexican Lucha Libre Heavyweight Championship (1 time)
- World Class Wrestling Alliance
  - WCWA California Championship (1 time)
- Urban Wrestling Federation
  - UWF Championship (1 time)

== Filmography ==
- 101 Reasons Not To Be A Pro Wrestler (2005)
