= Minichiello (surname) =

Minichiello is an Italian surname of patronymic origin, being one of those surnames based on the first name of the father of the original bearer. In this case, the surname originates from the personal name Domenico, which in turn derives from the Latin "Dominicus". The latter is an adjective related to the term "dominus", which means "master of the house", and later was used to indicate God. Sunday in fact, the day dedicated to the sun-god, in Latin was called "Domenica die" and today in Italian just "Domenica". The name Domenico was popularized by San Domenico of Guzman, who is mainly known as the founder of the Dominican Order of Preachers, who are amongst the leading teacher in Europe.

The surname Minichiello is a pet form of the name Domenico, which, by the process of apheresis, became Menico (a personal name in itself). Then the suffix "-iello", used as diminutive, was added to it to form the personal name Minichiello, which later became a surname. The suffix "-iello" of the surname Minichiello, is one of those suffixes such as "-ino", "-one", and "-etto", which give a particular flavor and meaning to nouns and adjectives to which they are attached. Since the Middle Ages, they were and are used with first names to indicate size, age, affection, physical and moral qualities, and have for the most part developed inside the family circle as pet names.

As the closest variants to the surname Minichiello, the "Dizionario Storico Blasonico", a compilation of the Italian nobility, mentions two families by the name of Menicozzi and Meniconi. The first one was registered amongst the nobility of Viterbo (Lazio), and one member of the other was created Palatine Count in 1519 by Pope Pius V.

== Blazon of arms ==
Azure, a fesse between two mullets or, one in chief and one in base.

== Crest ==
An eagle displayed sable, crowned.

== Origin ==
Italy, there is a particularly high concentration of Minichiellos in the town of Grottaminarda, Avellino.

== Notable people ==
- Anthony Minichiello, Australian rugby player
- Dino Minichiello, Canadian investor and entrepreneur
- Mark Minichiello, Australian rugby player
- Nicola Minichiello, British bobsledder
- Paul Minichiello, master tailor who specialized in bespoke couture
- Toni Minichiello, UK Athletics national coach
