= Samoa Joe =

American wrestler (born 1979)

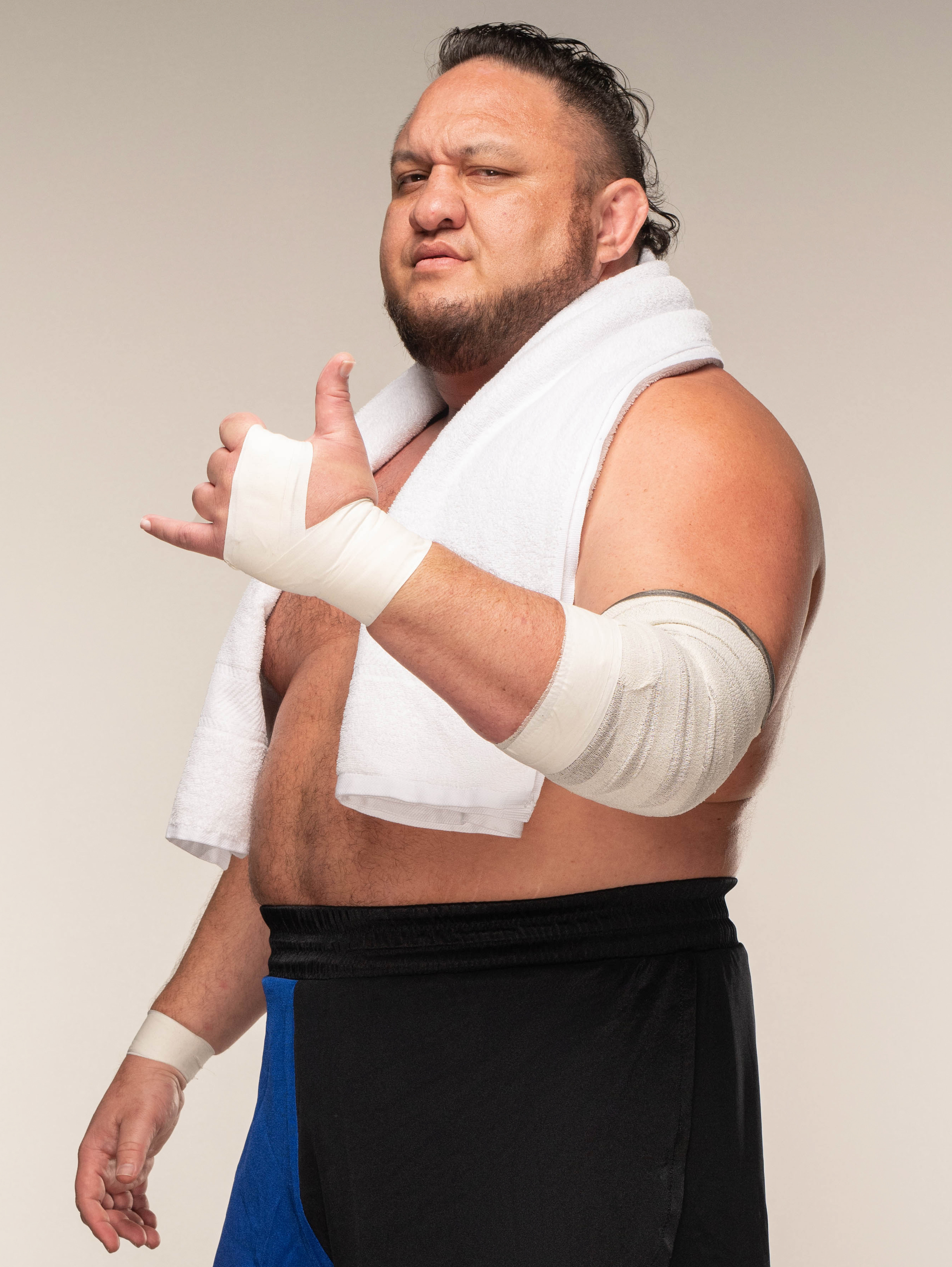
- Samoa Joe in 2022

Personal information
- Born: Nuufolau Joel Seanoa; March 17, 1979 (age 47) Orange County, California, U.S.
- Spouse: Jessica Seanoa (m. 2007)
- Children: 2

Professional wrestling career
- Ring names: Joe Seanoa; Joe Seannoa; King Joe; Samoa Joe
- Billed height: 6 ft 2 in (188 cm)
- Billed weight: 282 lb (128 kg)
- Billed from: Huntington Beach, California; "Isle of Samoa"
- Trained by: John Delayo; Cincinnati Red; Johnny Hemp; Inoki Dojo
- Debut: December 1999

Nuufolau Joel Seanoa (born March 17, 1979), better known by the ring name Samoa Joe, is an American professional wrestler. He is signed to All Elite Wrestling (AEW), where he is the leader of the Opps. He is also known for his work with Ring of Honor (ROH), Total Nonstop Action Wrestling (TNA), and WWE.

Debuting in 1999, Joe joined ROH soon after its formation in 2002, going on to hold the ROH World Championship for a record 21 months from March 2003 to December 2004 as well as holding the ROH Pure Championship. At Slammiversary in June 2005, he joined TNA, where he embarked on a 19-month-long undefeated streak that ended in a feud with Kurt Angle. During his 10-year stint in TNA, he held the TNA World Heavyweight Championship once, the TNA X Division Championship five times, the TNA World Tag Team Championship twice, and the TNA Television Championship once, and headlined the 2008 edition of TNA's flagship annual event, Bound for Glory.

After departing TNA in 2015, Joe began wrestling for WWE on its NXT brand. After winning the NXT Championship twice, he joined the main roster in January 2017, going on to win the WWE United States Championship on two occasions and headline several WWE pay-per-views and livestreaming supercards. In 2019, he began working as a color commentator due to accumulated injuries. He was released from his contract in April 2021, but was rehired that June, winning the NXT Championship a third time before being released once again in January 2022.

Joe was named part of the inaugural class of the ROH Hall of Fame in January 2022. Three months later he made his debut in AEW, and concurrently returned to ROH, which had by then become AEW's sister promotion following its purchase by AEW founder and co-owner Tony Khan. In AEW/ROH, Joe held the AEW TNT Championship twice and the ROH World Television Championship once (holding both titles simultaneously) and set a new record for the longest reign as ROH World Television Champion. He then defeated MJF for the AEW World Championship in December 2023, making him the only wrestler to have held the AEW, ROH, and TNA World Championships.

Outside of wrestling, Seanoa is an actor and voice actor; he is known for playing Sweet Tooth in the 2023 television series Twisted Metal, voicing King Shark in the 2024 video game Suicide Squad: Kill the Justice League, and lending both appearance and voice to antagonist Raymond Law in Like a Dragon: Pirate Yakuza in Hawaii.

== Early life ==
Seanoa was born on March 17, 1979 to Pete and Portia Seanoa. He was raised in Orange County, California. As a child, Seanoa performed for "Tiare Productions", a Polynesian dance troupe founded by his parents in 1965. At the age of five, Seanoa performed in the opening ceremony of the 1984 Summer Olympics at the Los Angeles Memorial Coliseum. He became a California State Junior Judo Champion and was an all league football player while attending Ocean View High School. Seanoa attended college, where he played football. Before becoming a wrestler, he worked as a mortgage broker.

== Professional wrestling career ==
=== Early career (1999–2001) ===
Seanoa became involved in professional wrestling after attending a Jiu-Jitsu class and being encouraged by instructors to attend a professional wrestling school taking place afterwards, whereupon he "fell in love with it" and began training regularly. Seanoa attended the United Independent Wrestling Alliance (UIWA) West Coast Dojo, where he trained under Cincinnati Red, Johnny Hemp and, occasionally, John Delayo. He debuted in December 1999 in a match against "Uncle" Jess Hansen three months after beginning his training, adopting the ring name "Samoa Joe". In 2000, Joe began appearing with the California-based Ultimate Pro Wrestling (UPW) promotion, then a developmental affiliate of the World Wrestling Federation (WWF), after being scouted by Brett Wagner. While in UPW, Joe feuded with John Cena and held the UPW No Holds Barred Championship from March to April 2001. He was named Southern California's Rookie of the Year for 2000. In February 2001, he appeared on an episode of WWF Jakked, losing to Essa Rios; he was subsequently told by WWF personnel that he "didn't have a future in [the WWF]". In March 2001, Joe defeated Christopher Daniels to win the UPW Heavyweight Championship; he held the title for a record 258 days before losing to Mikey Henderson in November 2001. In October 2001, Joe competed in All Pro Wrestling's "King of Indies" tournament that was won by American Dragon.

=== Pro Wrestling Zero-One (2001–2003) ===
As part of a working arrangement between Ultimate Pro Wrestling and Shinya Hashimoto's Pro Wrestling Zero-One promotion, Joe made his first appearance in Japan in June 2001 during Pro Wrestling Zero-One's "Shingeki" pay-per-view. In his debut match he teamed with Keiji Sakoda to defeat Katsumi Usuda and Yuki Ishikawa to become the inaugural Intercontinental Tag Team Champions; the titles were awarded to Mike Rapada and Steve Corino the following month. Joe went on to take part in the 2001 Fire Festival, finishing second in his block with four points after defeating George Takano and Masato Tanaka but losing to Kohei Sato.

Joe returned to Pro Wrestling Zero-One in January 2002, where Masato Tanaka and Shinjiro Otani defeated him and Tom Howard to win the vacant Intercontinental Tag Team Championship. He continued to work for the promotion throughout 2002, participating in a number of its biggest shows and tournaments as "Samoa Joe" and later "King Joe". He tagged with several other American wrestlers, including Samoan Savage. Joe took part in the 2002 Fire Festival, finishing last in his block with two points after defeating Kintaro Kanemura but losing to TAKA Michinoku, Masato Tanaka, and eventual overall winner Shinjiro Otani.

Joe made his final appearances with Pro Wrestling Zero-One in August 2003 as part of its "Summer Festival 2003" tour. Wrestling as "King Joe", he competed in a series of tag team matches and six-man tag team matches, including teaming with King Adamo to unsuccessfully challenge Kohei Sato and Hirotaka Yokoi for the All Asia Tag Team Championship.

=== Independent circuit (2001–2015) ===
Joe wrestled for many independent promotions from 2001 to 2015, including IWA Mid-South, Pro Wrestling Guerrilla, Jersey All Pro Wrestling, the United Wrestling Federation, Full Impact Pro, and Major League Wrestling. In 2004, Joe won IWA Mid-South's Revolution Strong Style Tournament. On June 11, 2005, Joe faced Necro Butcher at IWA Mid-South's "Something to Prove" event in an "infamous" and "brutal" match that was later featured on a 2026 episode of Dark Side of the Ring.

=== Ring of Honor (2002–2008) ===
In 2002, Samoa Joe joined the ranks of the nascent Philadelphia, Pennsylvania-based promotion Ring of Honor (ROH), which had been impressed by his work in Japan and on the United States independent circuit. He debuted in October 2002 at "Glory By Honor" as Christopher Daniels's "hired assassin", brought in to defeat Daniels's chief enemy, Low Ki. Originally booked for a single match against Low Ki, Joe impressed fans with his extremely stiff and hard-hitting style that resembled a mixed martial arts fighter more than a wrestler, resulting in ROH booking him full-time.

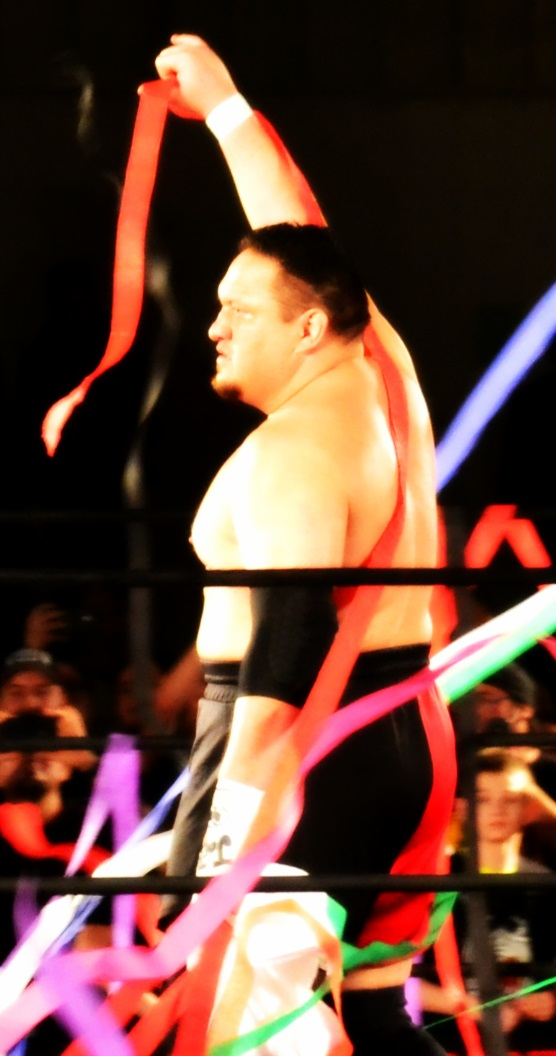
Joe in March 2015 upon his return to Ring of Honor.

Joe quickly rose through the ranks and became ROH Champion by defeating Xavier at Night of Champions in March 2003. After he defeated The Zebra Kid at "Frontiers of Honor" in London, England in May 2003, the title was renamed the ROH World Championship. Joe held the title for a record 645 days, defending the title 29 times in the United States and in Europe. During this time, he had a trilogy of title defenses against CM Punk. In June 2004, Joe successfully defended the ROH World Championship against Shinya Makabe in a bout promoted by New Japan Pro-Wrestling at the Inoki Dojo in Santa Monica, California. Joe's reign ended after 645 days when he lost to Austin Aries at Final Battle 2004 in December 2004. His title reign was praised for the quality of the matches and the exposition given to ROH. Writing for PWInsider.com, Mike Johnson called Joe the best ROH World Champion, comparing him to Harley Race or Ric Flair as traveling champion.

Soon after losing the ROH World Championship to Aries, Joe became the ROH Pure Champion by defeating his on-screen protégé Jay Lethal in May 2005. He lost the title to Nigel McGuinness at "Dragon Gate Invasion" in August 2005. In October 2005, when Japanese wrestler Kenta Kobashi made a trip to the United States, he was signed to two Ring of Honor shows. ROH officials selected Joe to face him in a singles match on the first night and a tag match on the second. They had a highly acclaimed match, which won the Wrestling Observer Newsletter award for "Match of the Year", with the Wrestling Observer Newsletter also naming Joe "Most Outstanding Wrestler" for 2005. In 2015, the Wrestling Observer Newsletter described the match as being "widely considered one of the company's defining moments".

In 2006, Joe was one of the principal wrestlers representing Ring of Honor during an interpromotional feud with the Philadelphia promotion Combat Zone Wrestling (CZW). The feud culminated in a five-on-five "Cage of Death" match at "Death before Dishonor IV" in July 2006. At the September 16, 2006 ROH show, Joe got into an argument and pull-apart brawl with Pro Wrestling Noah star Takeshi Morishima. Subsequently, a match was signed for February 2007 pitting Joe against Morishima which Joe won. Joe later teamed with Homicide to fight against the Briscoes, and, like Homicide, found himself back in the ROH World Championship hunt. Joe, however, came up short against champion Bryan Danielson in several matches, including a match that ended in a time limit drawn after 60 minutes and a cage match in December 2006.

Joe ceased to be a full-time performer in ROH on March 4, 2007. His appearances leading up to that date were billed as the "Samoa Joe Farewell Tour". On March 4, he defeated long-time rival Homicide in the Liverpool Olympia in Liverpool, England in his final ROH match. On November 22, 2008, Joe made a one night return to ROH at Rising Above (its second every pay-per-view), defeating Tyler Black in a dark match.

=== Inoki Dojo (2004) ===
In 2004, Joe appeared with Inoki Dojo, an American offshoot of New Japan Pro-Wrestling based in Santa Monica, California. He made his first appearance in April 2004, teaming with Bobby Quance in a loss to Aaron Aguilera and American Dragon, then later that month wrestled Aguilera to a time limit draw. Joe made a handful of appearances with Inoki Dojo in June and July 2004, including successfully defending the ROH World Championship against Shinya Makabe. Joe made his final appearance with Inoki Dojo in December 2004, teaming with Chad Malenko in a loss to Katsushi Takemura and Osamu Nishimura.

=== Total Nonstop Action Wrestling (2005–2015) ===
==== Undefeated streak; feud with Kurt Angle (2005–2007) ====
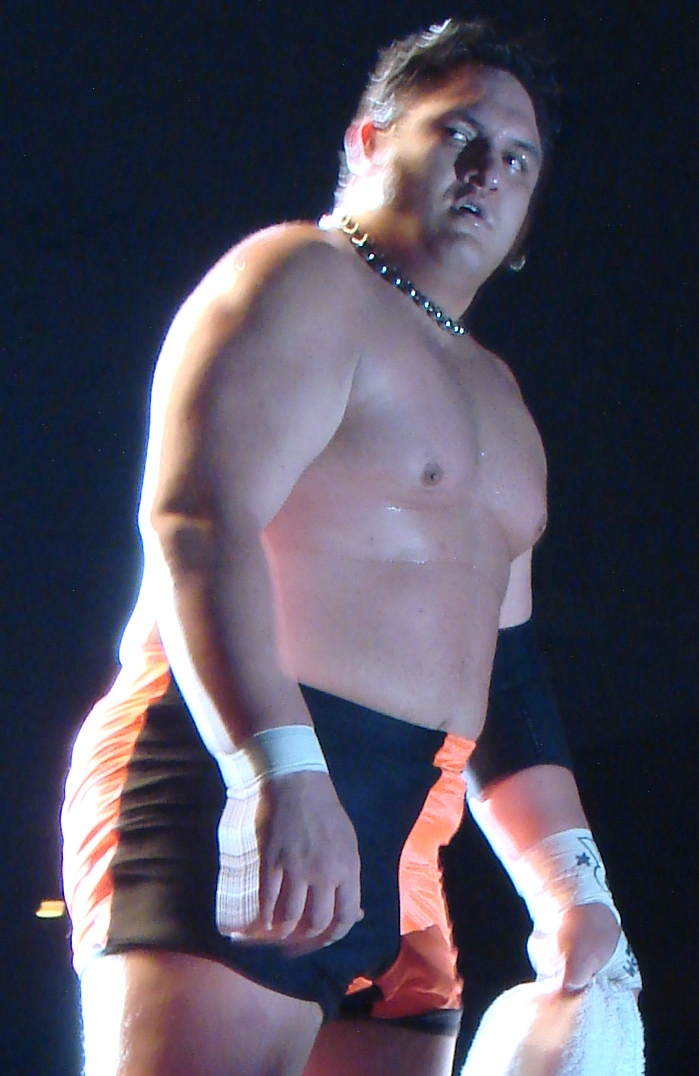
Joe in April 2007.

After being courted by both Total Nonstop Action Wrestling (TNA) and World Wrestling Entertainment (WWE), Joe signed a contract with TNA in June 2005. He debuted later that month at Slammiversary, defeating Sonjay Dutt. Joe subsequently entered the 2005 TNA Super X Cup Tournament, defeating Sonjay Dutt and Alex Shelley before defeating AJ Styles in the tournament finals at Sacrifice in August 2005 following interference from Christopher Daniels. As a result of Daniels' interference, TNA Director of Authority Larry Zbyszko booked a three-way match for Daniels' X Division Championship at Unbreakable in September 2005. The match was won by Styles, though Joe's undefeated streak remained intact as it was Daniels who was pinned. The match received "five star" rating from journalist Dave Meltzer, the first in TNA's history. At Bound for Glory in October 2005, Joe defeated New Japan Pro-Wrestling's Jushin Liger.

Joe defeated Styles to win the X Division Championship at Turning Point in December 2005. At Final Resolution in January 2006, Joe defended the championship against Daniels, winning by technical knockout. At Against All Odds in February 2006, Joe defeated Daniels and Styles in a rematch from Unbreakable to retain the title. At Destination X in March 2006, Joe lost the title to Daniels in an Ultimate X match (a match in which there is no pinfall or submission, thus preserving Joe's undefeated streak).

On the April 13, 2006 episode of Impact, Joe defeated Christopher Daniels to win the X Division Championship for a second time. In late-May 2006, Joe was absent for two weeks while rehabilitating a major tear to his posterior cruciate ligament. At Slammiversary in June 2006, Joe defeated Scott Steiner. On June 19, Joe defended the X Division Championship against Senshi and Sonjay Dutt in a triple threat match; after Steiner interfered in the match and gave Joe a chair shot, Senshi pinned Dutt to win the Championship, ending Joe's second reign.

At Victory Road in July 2006, Joe, Steiner, Sting, and Christian Cage took part in a four-way match to determine the number one contender to the NWA World Heavyweight Championship; the match ended when Sting pinned Steiner. At No Surrender in September 2006, Joe defeated Jeff Jarrett in a non-title "fan's revenge lumberjack match". After the match, he took Jarrett's title belt. On the October 12 episode of Impact, Joe agreed to return the belt to the winner of the forthcoming bout between Jarrett and Sting at Bound for Glory on the condition that the winner give him a title shot. This offer was turned down by TNA Management Director Jim Cornette, who gave Joe the choice of returning the title or be fired. After Joe again refused to return the belt, he got into a brawl with the debuting Kurt Angle, allowing Jarrett to retrieve the belt. At Bound for Glory later that month, Joe defeated Abyss, Brother Runt, and Raven in a Monster's Ball match after guest referee Jake Roberts performed a DDT on Raven, allowing Joe to defeat Raven. Later that night, Joe was involved in a pull-apart brawl with Angle after Cornette announced that he would be fired if he interfered in the match between Jarrett and Sting that involved Angle as special enforcer. At Genesis in November 2006, Joe lost to Angle after submitting to Angle's ankle lock. This ended his 18-month undefeated streak. At Turning Point in December 2006, Joe defeated Kurt Angle by submission. At Final Resolution in January 2007, Joe lost to Angle in a 30-minute Iron Man match. The feud between Joe and Angle was named PWI Feud of the Year for 2007 by Pro Wrestling Illustrated, while Joe was named PWI Most Popular Wrestler of the Year for 2006 by Pro Wrestling Illustrated.

==== Dual champion; alliance with Kevin Nash (2007–2008) ====
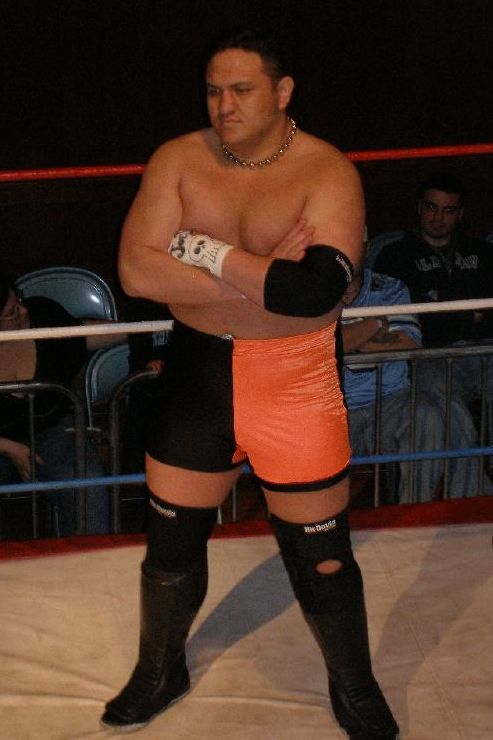
Joe in May 2007.

In February 2007, Joe won a Gauntlet for the Gold match to become the number one contender for the NWA World Heavyweight Championship; the following month at Destination X he unsuccessfully challenged champion Christian Cage. On the July 12 episode of Impact, Joe defeated Jay Lethal and Chris Sabin to win the X Division Championship. His victory entitled him to take part in the "Match of Champions" at Victory Road later that month; during the Match of Champions, Joe pinned Brother Ray to win the TNA World Tag Team Championship, making him the first wrestler in TNA to simultaneously hold multiple TNA championships. He opted to hold the Championship by himself rather than choosing a tag team partner. At Hard Justice in August 2007, Joe put up the X Division Championship the TNA World Tag Team Championship against Kurt Angle's TNA World Heavyweight Championship and IWGP Heavyweight Championship, losing the match (and both his titles) thanks to interference by Karen Angle.

At No Surrender in September 2007, Joe lost to Christian Cage. The following month at Bound For Glory, Joe defeated Cage in a rematch. At Genesis in November 2007, Joe defeated Robert Roode. That same month, Joe won the inaugural TNA Turkey Bowl.

At Turning Point in December 2007, Joe was scheduled to team with Kevin Nash and Scott Hall to face the Angle Alliance. However, Hall, no-showed the event. Before the match, Joe was asked to cut a promo introducing Eric Young as Hall's replacement. Joe went five minutes overtime and criticized Hall, Nash and several other wrestlers, legitimately angering Nash and TNA president Dixie Carter, The match saw Joe, Nash, and Young defeat the Angle Alliance when Joe pinned Tomko. After the match, Joe and Nash briefly argued and shoved one another backstage, with Joe apologizing at a talent meeting the following day. The incident was parlayed into a storyline where Joe directed his frustrations towards TNA management, After complaining to TNA Management Director Jim Cornette that he did not have a match at Final Resolution in January 2008, Cornette scheduled a match pitting Joe and Nash against TNA World Tag Team Champions AJ Styles and Tomko. The match saw Nash refuse to tag himself in, leading to Styles and Tomko defeating Joe.

==== World Heavyweight Champion (2008) ====
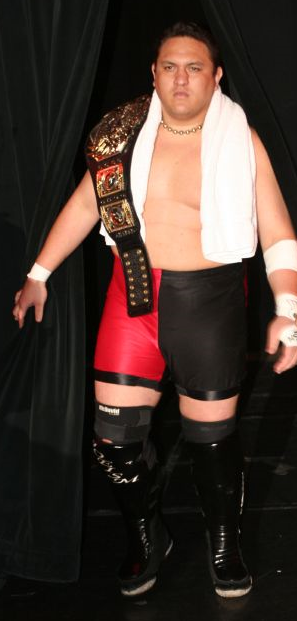
Joe as TNA World Heavyweight Champion in September 2008.

At Against All Odds in February 2008, Joe served as the special enforcer for the TNA World Heavyweight Championship match between champion Kurt Angle and challenger Christian Cage. During the match, AJ Styles interfered and fought Joe away from the ring, enabling Tomko to interfere to help Angle win the match. On the February 14 episode of Impact, Joe formed a stable with Cage and Kevin Nash to compete with Angle's Angle Alliance.

At Lockdown in April 2008, Joe defeated Angle in a title versus career match to win his first and only TNA World Championship. Writing in 2015, the Wrestling Observer Newsletter described the bout between Angle and Joe as "arguably the company's peak in terms of creative, match quality, business, and production coming together". The win also made Joe the third TNA Triple Crown Champion.

At Sacrifice in May 2008, Joe successfully defended the TNA World Championship against Kaz and Scott Steiner in a three way match. At Slammiversary the following month, Joe successfully defended the title against Booker T, Christian Cage, Rhino, and Robert Roode in a King of the Mountain match. At Victory Road in July 2008, Joe defended his title against Booker T in a singles match, with the match ending in a no contest after Sting hit Joe with a baseball bat and Booker T pinned him while Booker T's valet Sharmell made the three count. At Hard Justice in August 2008, Joe defeated Booker T in a steel cage weapons match to retain his title. At No Surrender in September 2008, Joe defeated Christian Cage and Kurt Angle in a three way match to retain his title.

At Bound for Glory IV in October 2008, Joe lost to Sting, ending his reign as TNA World Heavyweight Champion at 182 days. During the match, Joe suffered an injury after landing back-first on a flight of cement stairs while executing a dropkick; the Wrestling Observer Newsletter stated that subsequently Joe "was never the same [...] His work noticeably slowed down, he gained weight". Writing for the Wrestling Observer Newsletter, Kyle Johnson stated "Joe’s standing as a main event star in the company entered a downward spiral from 2009 on and never recovered. His TNA World Heavyweight Championship run was almost completely unmemorable, ending at Bound for Glory 2008 in a match where he attempted a dropkick from a press box onto concrete stairs to horrifying effect. Joe was truly never the same after that bump."

==== Front Line; Main Event Mafia (2008–2009) ====
On the October 30, 2008 episode of Impact, Joe and AJ Styles formed a faction of younger wrestlers called the "Front Line", to oppose the Main Event Mafia of Kurt Angle, Sting, Kevin Nash, Booker T, and Scott Steiner. At Turning Point in November 2008, Nash defeated Joe by cheating. At Final Resolution in December 2008, the Front Line lost to the Main Event Mafia in an eight man tag team match. On the December 18 episode of Impact, Joe and Styles defeated Sting and Nash in a Six Sides of Steel match. Following the match, Joe was attacked by the Main Event Mafia; the attack was billed as having left him with injuries that would sideline him for the rest of the year.

On the January 29, 2009 episode of Impact, a video aired in which Joe – sporting a buzz cut, face paint, and a much heavier frame – stated he wanted to introduce the Main Event Mafia to his "Nation of Violence". Joe subsequently began feuding with Main Event Mafia member Scott Steiner, including a controversial angle where he menaced Steiner with a large knife. At Destination X in March 2009, Joe quickly lost to Steiner by disqualification after throwing the referee out of the ring. At Lockdown in April 2009, Joe teamed with Styles, Christopher Daniels, and Jeff Jarrett to defeat the Main Event Mafia in a Lethal Lockdown match. Joe went to feud with Main Event Mafia member Kevin Nash, defeating him at Sacrifice in May 2009.

At Slammiversary Seven in June 2009, Joe competed in a King of the Mountain match for the TNA World Heavyweight Championship; at the climax of the match, instead of winning himself, Joe handed the title belt to Kurt Angle, enabling him to win. On the June 25 episode of Impact, Joe officially joined the Main Event Mafia. At Victory Road in July 2009, Joe defeated Sting by submission in a grudge match with the assistance of the debuting Taz, who was announced as Joe's new adviser. The relationship between Joe and Taz ended the following month when Taz became a color commentator. At Hard Justice in August 2009, Joe defeated Homicide to win the X Division Championship for the fourth time. At No Surrender the following month, Joe successfully defended the X Division Championship against Christopher Daniels. On the October 8 episode of Impact, Joe lost the X Division Championship to Amazing Red after Bobby Lashley interfered in the match. At Bound for Glory later that month, Lashley defeated Joe in a submission match via referee stoppage. On the following episode of Impact, the Main Event Mafia was disbanded by Kurt Angle.

==== World Heavyweight Championship pursuits (2009–2010) ====
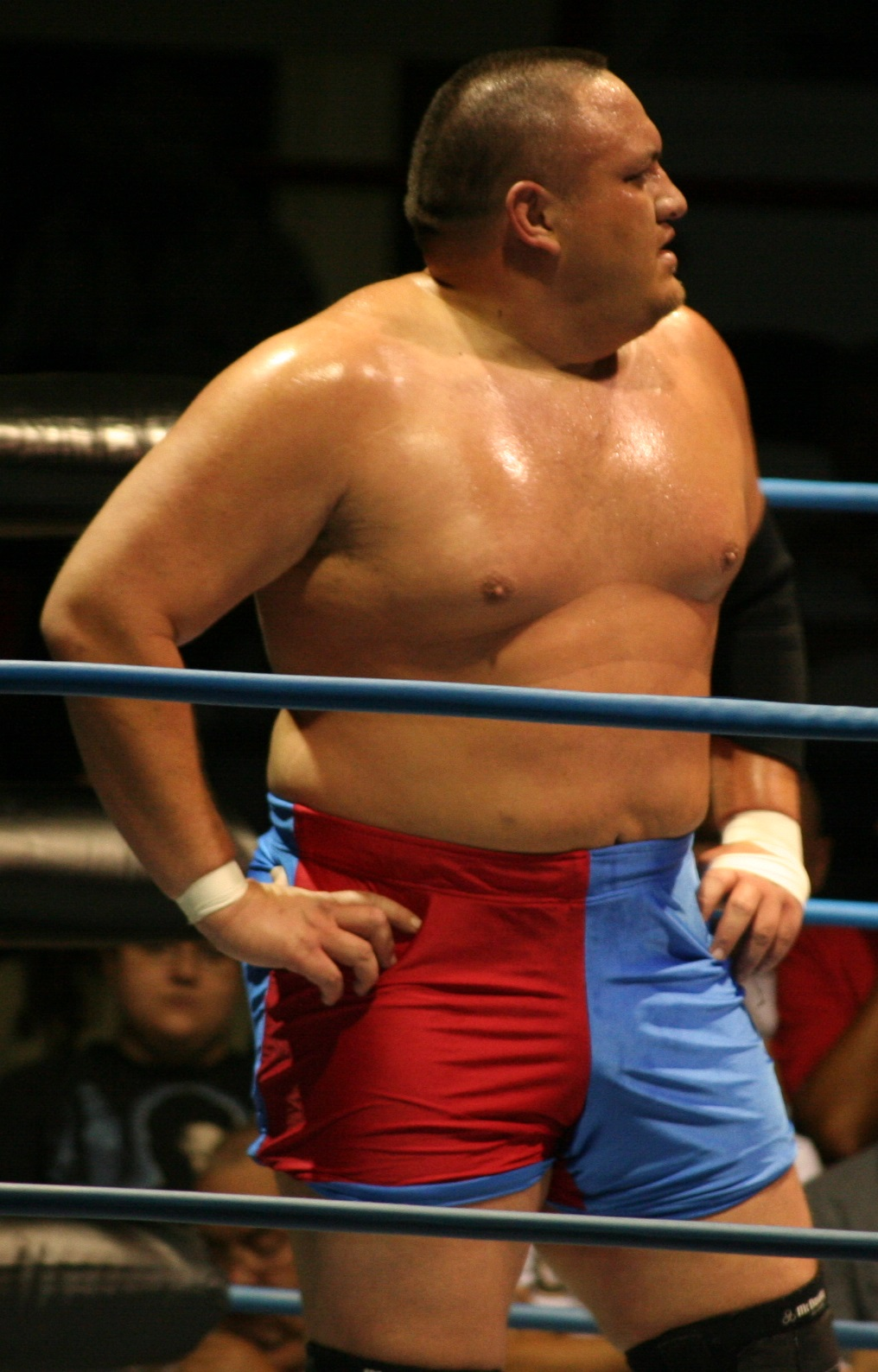
Joe in July 2010.

In November 2009 at Turning Point, Joe unsuccessfully challenged TNA World Heavyweight Champion AJ Styles in a three-way match that also involved Christopher Daniels. At Final Resolution in December 2009, Joe took part in the "Feast or Fired" match, winning the briefcase containing a title shot at the TNA World Heavyweight Championship. In January 2010, Joe took part in TNA's "Maximum Impact" tour of the UK. After being off TV for several weeks, Joe returned on the February 4 episode of Impact, attacking Styles. At Against All Odds later that month, Joe unsuccessfully challenged Styles in a no disqualification match refereed by Eric Bischoff. On the following episode of Impact, Joe was attacked and abducted by "ninjas".

Joe returned on the April 19, 2010 episode of Impact as the surprise partner of "Team Hogan" (Abyss, Jeff Jarrett, and Rob Terry) in an eight-man tag team match against "Team Flair" (Desmond Wolfe, James Storm, Robert Roode, and Sting); his abduction never was explained. In the following weeks, Joe randomly attacked wrestlers including Brian Kendrick, Douglas Williams, and Matt Morgan. In May 2010, Joe was ranked number 10 in the inaugural TNA Championship Committee rankings to determine the number one contender for the TNA World Heavyweight Championship. Joe subsequently climbed the rankings, ultimately wrestling number two ranked Jeff Hardy to a 10-minute time limit draw on the July 22 episode of Impact. After the match with Hardy, Joe was upset with TNA's production crew for displaying a countdown to the time limit draw which Joe had specifically requested not be done to avoid spoiling the ending of the match; the "blow-up" resulted in Joe being suspended from TNA.

==== Various feuds; losing streak (2010–2011) ====
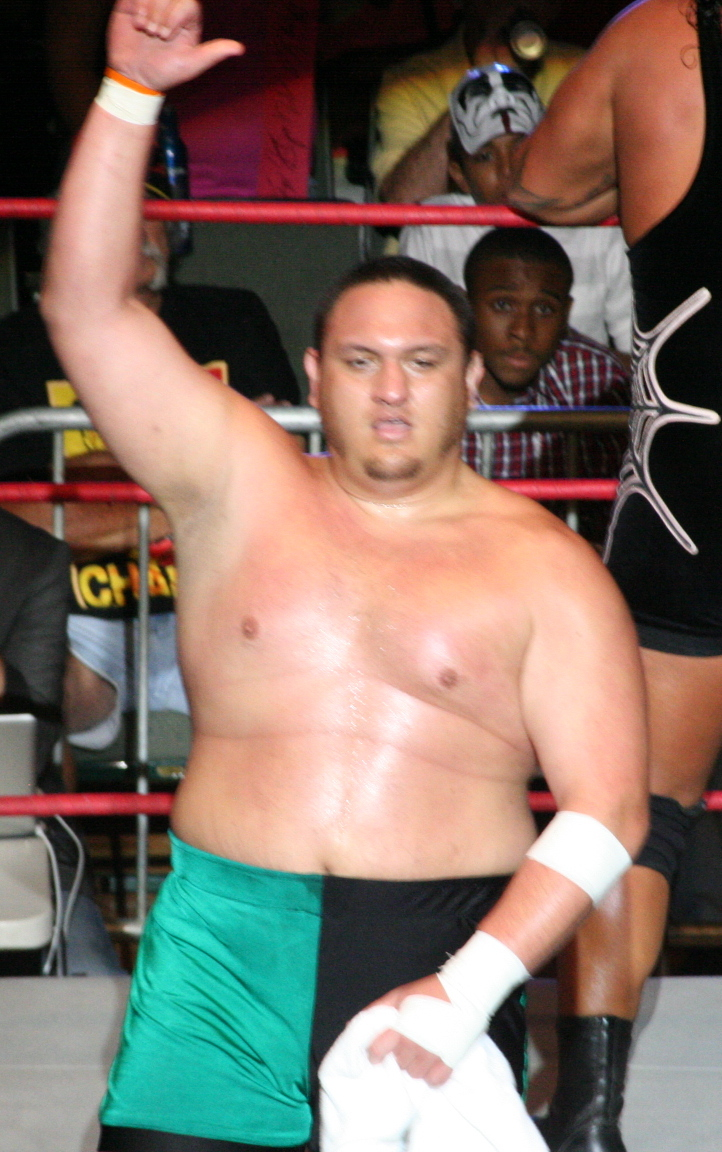
Joe in October 2010.

Joe returned from his suspension in August 2010, aligning himself with Hulk Hogan and Jeff Jarrett in their feud with Kevin Nash and Sting. At No Surrender in September 2010, Joe and Jarrett defeated Nash and Sting in a tag team match. At Bound for Glory in October 2010, Joe and Jarrett faced Nash, Sting, and D'Angelo Dinero in a handicap match after Hogan, who was scheduled to team with Joe and Jarrett, pulled out of the match due to injury. Joe lost the match after being abandoned by Jarrett; subsequently, it was revealed that Hogan's injury had been a ruse as he helped Jeff Hardy win the vacant TNA World Heavyweight Championship and formed a new villainous stable, Immortal. At Turning Point in November 2010, Jarrett defeated Joe after choking him out with a baton following interference from Immortal. The following month at Final Resolution, Joe lost to Jarrett in a submission match, again following interference from Immortal.

In December 2010, it was reported that Joe's contract with TNA had expired. However, later that month TNA president Dixie Carter announced that Joe had signed a new contract. Joe returned on the January 6, 2011 episode of Impact, confronting D'Angelo Dinero in a storyline where Okato (in a gimmick inspired by Kato of The Green Hornet) was hired by Joe to follow Dinero and film his activities in an attempt to prove he was a "scumbag". At Against All Odds in February 2011, Joe defeated Dinero with the help of Okato. At Lockdown in March 2011, Joe defeated Dinero by submission in a steel cage match.

In April 2011, Joe began feuding with the undefeated Crimson. In June 2011 at Slammiversary IX, Joe lost to Crimson, and afterwards shook Crimson's hand. Subsequently, Joe went on a losing streak with losses to Rob Van Dam, Devon, Kazarian and Bobby Roode. After losing all nine of his matches in the 2011 Bound for Glory Series to determine the number one contender to the TNA World Heavyweight Championship, Joe initially ended his losing streak on the August 4 episode of Impact Wrestling by defeating D'Angelo Dinero via submission; however, the decision was reversed after Joe refused to release the Coquina Clutch after the bell rang. Joe then gave a promo in which he accused TNA management of being against him and stated "the blood would be on [their] hands". Joe went on to attempt to disrupt the Bound for Glory Series by attacking various participants, including Crimson, who was forced to withdraw from the Series after suffering a storyline ankle injury at the hands of Joe. In the final week of the Bound for Glory Series, Joe attempted to interfere in a match between Gunner and Rob Van Dam, but was stopped by guest color commentator Matt Morgan. This led to a grudge match at No Surrender in September 2011 where Joe lost to Morgan. On the following episode of Impact Wrestling, Joe definitively ended his losing streak by defeating Morgan in a submission match. Joe then resumed his feud with the returning Crimson, who defeated Joe in a singles match on the October 6 episode of Impact Wrestling, and then again in a three-way match, also involving Matt Morgan, at Bound for Glory later that month.

==== World Tag Team Champion; Television Champion (2011–2012) ====
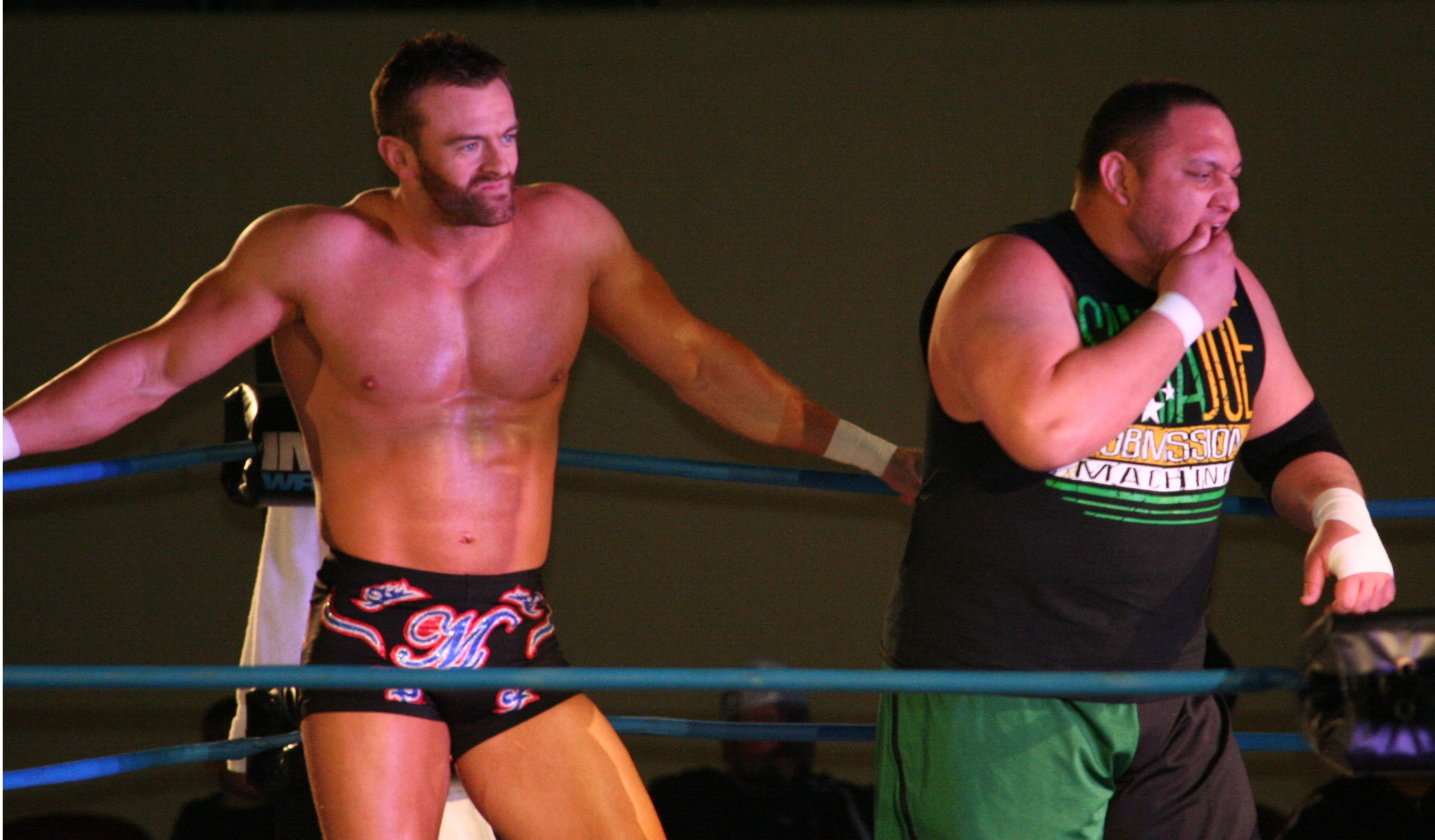
Joe (right) and Magnus in March 2012 during their reign as TNA World Tag Team Champions.

In November 2011, Joe won the Maximum Impact Tournament; he subsequently received a title shot against TNA World Heavyweight Champion Bobby Roode in the MEN Arena in Manchester, England, but was unsuccessful. In December 2011, Joe began teaming with Magnus, with Magnus stating in 2013 that booker Vince Russo put them together because "we were both always pissed off, so we could be pissed off together". The duo won the four week-long Wild Card Tournament to become the number one contenders to the TNA World Tag Team Championship. At Genesis in January 2012, Joe and Magnus unsuccessfully challenged Crimson and Matt Morgan for the TNA World Tag Team Championship. In a rematch the following month at Against All Odds, Joe and Magnus defeated Crimson and Morgan to win the TNA World Tag Team Championship. Joe and Magnus then defeated Crimson and Morgan in rematches on Impact Wrestling and at Victory Road to retain the Championship. After successfully defending the Championship against teams including Mexican America, the Motor City Machine Guns, and Jeff Hardy and Mr. Anderson, Joe and Magnus lost the TNA World Tag Team Championship to Christopher Daniels and Kazarian at Sacrifice in May 2012.

On the May 31, 2012 episode of Impact Wrestling, Joe had a confrontation with X Division Champion Austin Aries, leading to a match at Slammiversary 10 the following month where Joe unsuccessfully challenged Aries. Joe subsequently entered the 2012 Bound for Glory Series, ultimately being eliminated after losing to Jeff Hardy at No Surrender in September 2012.

On the September 27, 2012 episode of Impact Wrestling, Joe defeated Mr. Anderson to win the vacant TNA Television Championship, making him the third TNA Grand Slam Champion. At Bound for Glory the following month, Joe successfully defended the title against Magnus. At Turning Point in November 2012, Joe again successfully defended the title against Magnus, this time in a no disqualification match. On the December 6, 2012 episode of Impact Wrestling, Joe lost the TNA Television Championship to Devon after DOC of Aces & Eights hit him with a ball-peen hammer.

==== Feuds with Aces & Eights and Team Dixie (2012–2014) ====
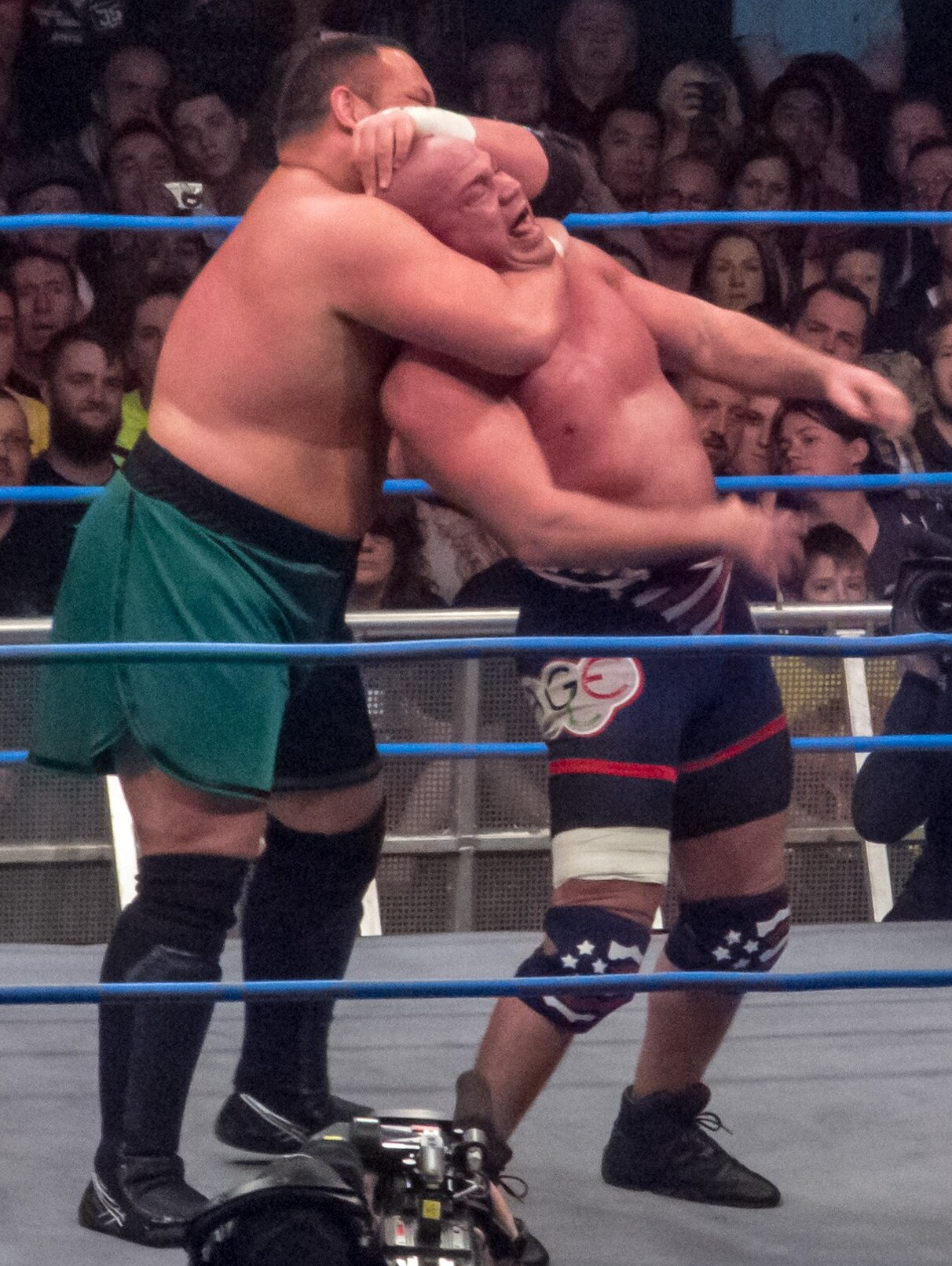
Joe (left) applying the Coquina Clutch on Kurt Angle in January 2013.

At Final Resolution in December 2012, Joe teamed with Garett Bischoff, Kurt Angle, and Wes Brisco to defeat Devon, DOC, and two masked members of Aces & Eights in an eight-man tag team match. At Genesis in January 2013, Joe lost to Aces & Eights member Mr. Anderson in a singles match following interference from Mike Knox. At Lockdown in March 2013, "Team TNA" (Joe, Eric Young, James Storm, Magnus, and Sting) defeated Aces & Eights (Devon, DOC, Garett Bischoff, Mike Knox, and Mr. Anderson) in a Lethal Lockdown match. On the April 18 episode of Impact Wrestling, Joe challenged Devon for the Television Championship, but lost after interference from Aces & Eights. At Slammiversary XI in June 2013, Joe teamed with Jeff Hardy and Magnus to defeat Garett Bischoff, Mr. Anderson, and Wes Brisco of Aces & Eights in a six-man tag team match. Later that month, Joe was announced as a member of the reformed Main Event Mafia alongside Sting and Kurt Angle. In October 2013 at Bound For Glory, Joe competed in an Ultimate X match that was won by Chris Sabin. On November 7, 2013, the Main Event Mafia was disbanded by Sting due to Aces & Eights having been defeated.

In November 2013, Joe was announced as an entrant in an eight-man tournament for the vacant TNA World Heavyweight Championship by TNA president Dixie Carter, who had stripped AJ Styles of the title. Joe subsequently angered Carter by announcing that, if he won the tournament, he would defend the title it against Styles, "whether it's here or anywhere else in the world". At Turning Point later that month, Magnus defeated Joe in a falls count anywhere match, eliminating him from the tournament. Magnus went on to win the tournament, and the title, at Final Resolution the following month with the assistance from Rockstar Spud and Carter's storyline nephew, Ethan Carter III. Joe went on to feud with "Team Dixie". At Genesis in January 2014, Joe defeated Rockstar Spud by submission, then unsuccessfully attempted to help Sting defeat Magnus for the TNA World Heavyweight Championship. At One Night Only:#OldSchool (which was recorded in December 2013, but aired in February 2014) Joe unsuccessfully challenged Magnus for the TNA World Heavyweight Championship following interference from Ethan Carter III. At Lockdown in March 2014, Joe unsuccessfully challenged Magnus in a cage match following interference from Abyss.

==== Final appearances (2014–2015) ====
In June 2014, Joe defeated Low Ki and Sanada in the finals of a tournament to win the TNA X Division Championship for a fifth and final time. At Hardcore Justice in August 2014, Joe successfully defended the X Division Championship against Low Ki. However, he vacated the title the following month due to an injury. At Bound for Glory in the Korakuen Hall in Tokyo, Japan in October 2014, Joe defended the title against Kaz Hayashi and Low Ki by in a three way dance despite not being the champion at the time, as the angle in which he vacated the title did not air until November 2014 due to a broadcast delay.

On the January 7, 2015 episode of Impact Wrestling, Joe, MVP, Kenny King, Low Ki, and Eric Young helped Bobby Lashley win the TNA World Heavyweight Championship from Bobby Roode. MVP subsequently named the group the Beat Down Clan and declared Lashley to be a founding member. However, Lashley refused to join the Beat Down Clan, prompting the Beat Down Clan to attack him. At Lockdown later that month, the Beat Down Clan lost to Lashley, Austin Aries, Gunner, and Kurt Angle in a Lethal Lockdown match. Writing for the Wrestling Observer Newsletter, Kyle Johnson described Joe as having been "relegated to little more than a henchman in a cumbersome heel stable".

Joe wrestled his final match for TNA on January 31, 2015, losing to Austin Aries in Wembley Arena in London, England (due to broadcast delay the match did not air until March 2015). In February 2015, Joe announced his departure from TNA, ending his run of nearly a decade with the company. According to Joe, he left TNA because of an incident during the European tour when the X Division Champion, Low Ki, suffered an injury and Joe was forced to book a match where he would lose the title; perceiving that TNA management did not care about the title change, he told TNA President Dixie Carter he would leave TNA.

=== Lucha Libre AAA Worldwide (2006, 2011) ===
In March 2006, Joe debuted in the Mexican Lucha Libre AAA Worldwide promotion as a member of the villainous La Legión Extranjera stable. At Rey de Reyes in Ciudad Madero, Joe teamed with Konnan and Ron Killings to take part in a four-way twelve-man tag team match pitting various factions against one another; the match was won by Lucha Libre AAA World Wide representatives Octagón, La Parka, and Vampiro. Joe returned to the promotion in September 2006 at Verano de Escándalo in Naucalpan, where he teamed with AJ Styles, Homicide, and Low Ki to defeat Abismo Negro, Charly Manson, Electroshock, and Histeria in an eight-man tag team match, then teamed with Styles and Low Ki to defeat the Mexican Powers (Crazy Boy, Joe Líder and Juventud Guerrera) in a six-man tag team match.

Joe returned to Lucha Libre AAA Worldwide in July 2011 as a member of the villainous faction La Sociedad. On 16 July in Orizaba, he teamed with L.A. Park and Scott Steiner to defeat Dr. Wagner Jr., Electroshock, and El Zorro. On July 31 in Guadalajara, he teamed with Silver King and Último Gladiador in a loss to Drago, Electroshock and Heavy Metal. The matches were broadcast on AAA Sin Limite on Televisa Deportes the following month.

=== Pro Wrestling Noah (2007, 2012) ===
On October 25, 2007, Joe made his debut for the Japanese promotion Pro Wrestling Noah as part of its "Autumn Navigation" tour. Wrestling in Yokohama, he teamed with Yoshihiro Takayama to defeat Mitsuharu Misawa and Takeshi Morishima. Two days later, Joe challenged Misawa for the GHC Heavyweight Championship in a one-on-one match at the Nippon Budokan in Tokyo, losing by pinfall after Misawa struck the back of Joe's head with his elbow.

On July 22, 2012, Joe returned to Pro Wrestling Noah as part of its "Great Voyage" tour. Teaming with Magnus, he defeated Special Assault Team (Akitoshi Saito and Jun Akiyama) to win the GHC Tag Team Championship in the Ryōgoku Kokugikan in Tokyo. Joe made his final appearance with Pro Wrestling Noah several months later on October 8, when he and Magnus lost the GHC Tag Team Championship to No Mercy (Kenta and Maybach Taniguchi) in Yokohama.

=== Return to Ring of Honor (2015) ===
After departing Total Nonstop Action Wrestling in February 2015, Samoa Joe briefly returned to ROH the following month. After defeating Kyle O'Reilly, ACH, and Michael Elgin in successive matches, Joe unsuccessfully challenged ROH World Champion Jay Briscoe in the main event of Supercard of Honor IX on March 27. On June 20, Joe teamed with AJ Styles to defeat ROH World Tag Team Champions Christopher Daniels and Frankie Kazarian in a non-title match. Joe subsequently left Ring of Honor once again.

=== WWE (2015–2022) ===
==== NXT Champion (2015–2017) ====
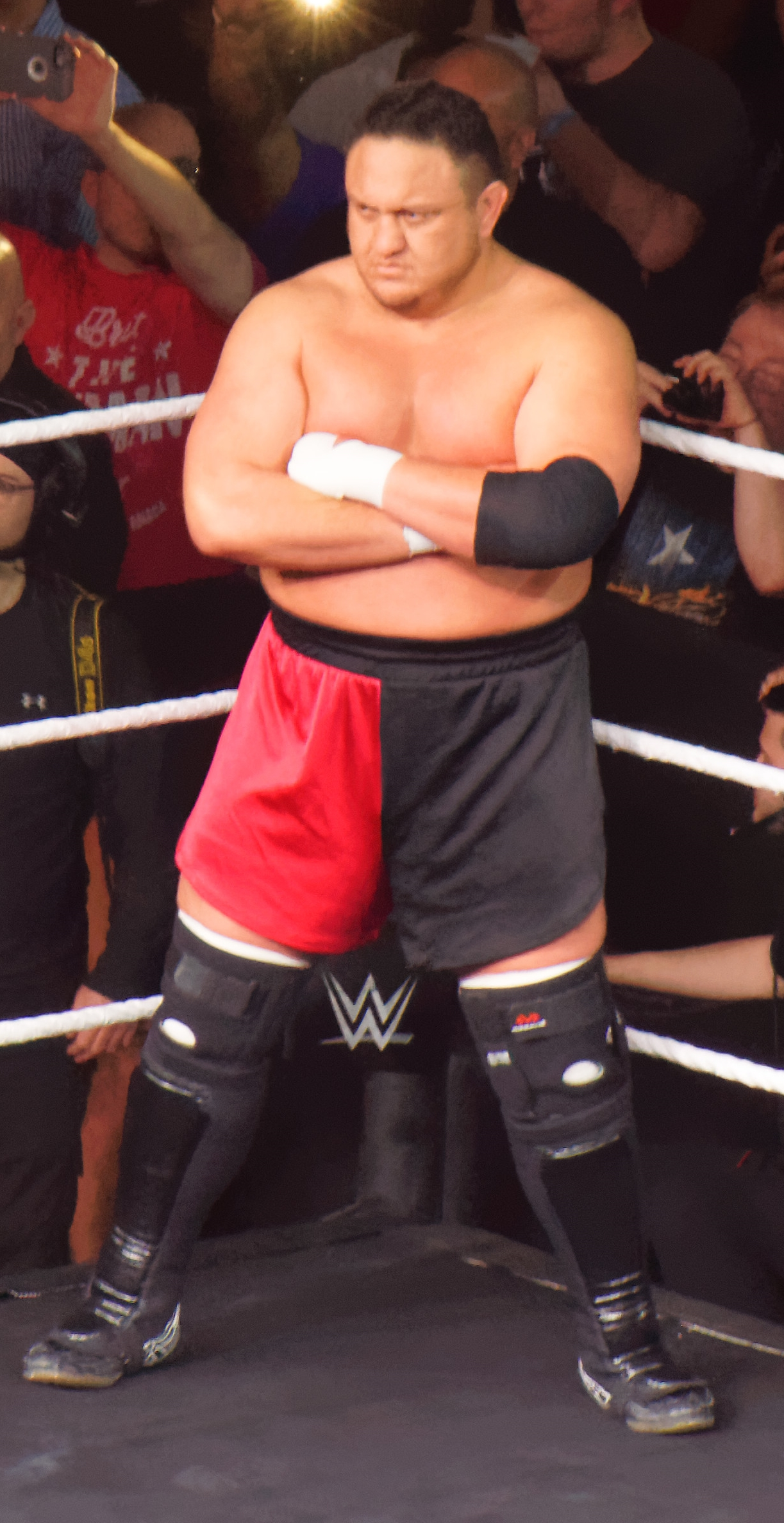
Joe at NXT TakeOver: Dallas in April 2016, before his title match against NXT Champion Finn Bálor.

In 2015, Samoa Joe was signed to a non-exclusive developmental contract by WWE. On May 20, 2015, during the main event of NXT TakeOver: Unstoppable, he stopped Kevin Owens from attacking Sami Zayn with a chair. Joe made his in-ring debut at the May 21 NXT tapings, defeating Scott Dawson in a match that aired on June 10. While initially Joe's contact enabled him to continue working outside WWE, on June 1, WWE signed him to a full-time contract due to his impressive merchandise sales. On the same day, Joe wrestled Tyson Kidd in a WWE Superstars dark match; the match ended when Kidd suffered a legitimate career-ending spinal cord injury when Joe gave him a muscle buster; in 2025, Joe called the injury the biggest regret of his career. Joe won the inaugural Dusty Rhodes Tag Team Classic tournament with NXT Champion Finn Bálor as his partner, defeating Baron Corbin and Rhyno in the finals at NXT TakeOver: Respect in October 2015.

On the November 4, 2015 episode of NXT, Joe turned on Finn Bálor by attacking him after a match against Apollo Crews. In December 2015 at NXT TakeOver: London, Joe unsuccessfully challenged Bálor for the NXT Championship. Writing for the Wrestling Observer Newsletter, Kyle Johnson described Joe as "leaner, focused, motivated, and completely revitalized [...] as hungry as he had been in 2003-05 when he was still making his name in Ring of Honor and TNA." After defeating Sami Zayn in a two out of three falls match to become the number one contender on the March 9 episode of NXT, Joe challenged Bálor once again at NXT TakeOver: Dallas in April 2016, losing after suffering a large laceration to his right cheek minutes into the match. Later that month at a NXT live event in Lowell, Massachusetts, Joe finally defeated Bálor to win the NXT Championship. In his first title defense, Joe defeated Bálor in a steel cage match in June 2016 at NXT TakeOver: The End, marking the end of their feud.

Joe then engaged in a feud with Shinsuke Nakamura, who defeated him in a title match on August 20 at NXT TakeOver: Brooklyn II, ending his reign at 121 days. During the match, Joe suffered a legitimate dislocated jaw. On November 19 at NXT TakeOver: Toronto, Joe defeated Nakamura in a rematch to win back the title. However, he lost the title back to Nakamura on December 3, 2016, in Osaka, Japan, ending his second reign at 14 days. Joe's feud with Nakamura ended on December 8, 2016, in Melbourne, Australia when Nakamura successfully defended the NXT Championship against him in a steel cage match.

==== World championship pursuits (2017–2019) ====
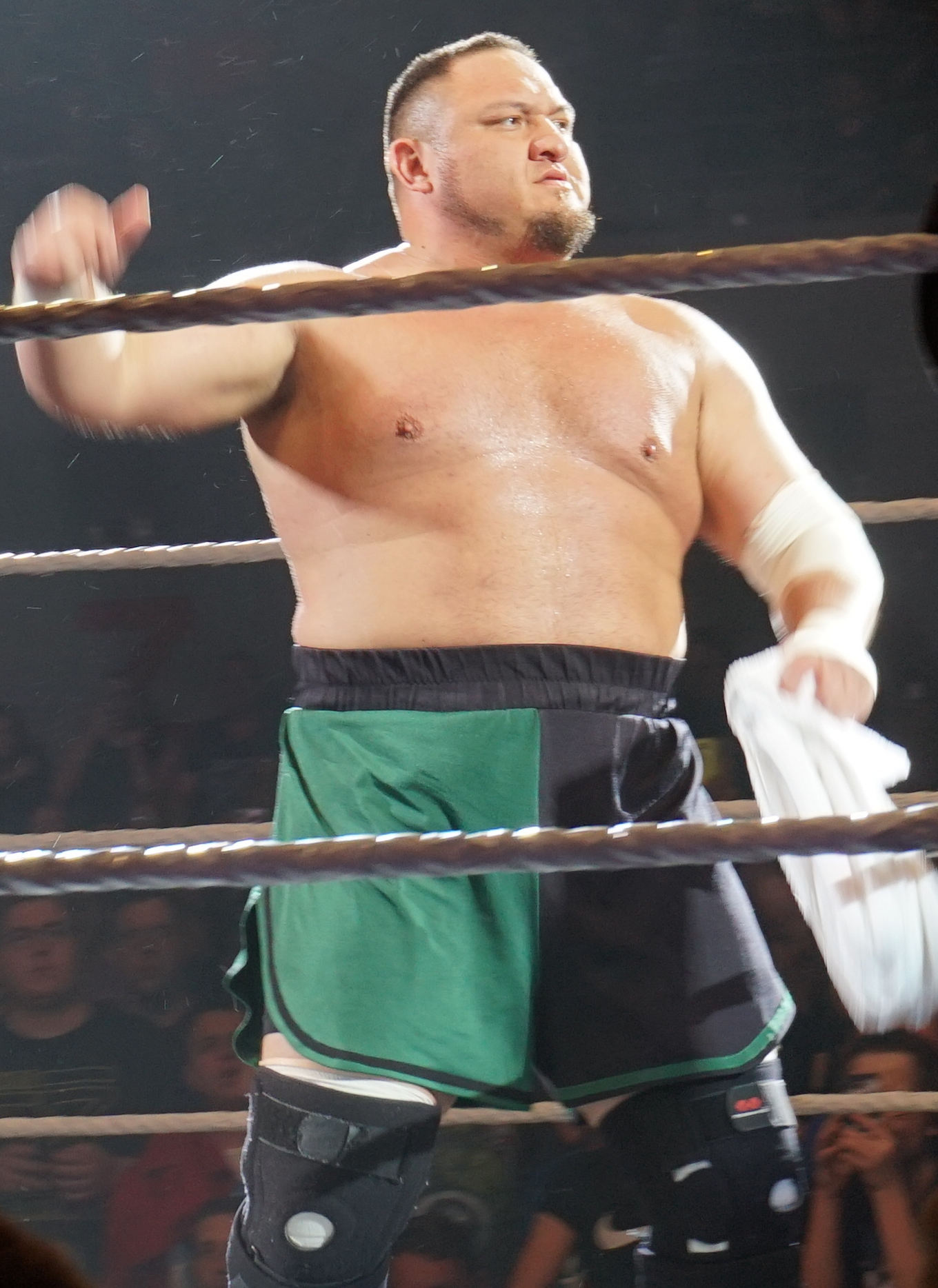
Joe in May 2017.

Joe debuted on WWE's main roster on the January 30, 2017 episode of Raw, attacking Seth Rollins and aligning himself with Triple H. Joe participated in the following PPVs Fastlane, and Payback. After he won an Extreme Rules match at Extreme Rules, he became the number one contender to the WWE Universal Championship, but lost against the champion Brock Lesnar at WWE Great Balls of Fire and SummerSlam. During a house show later that month, Joe suffered a knee injury.

Joe returned from injury on the October 30, 2017 episode of Raw. At Survivor Series in November 2017, Joe teamed with Finn Bálor, Braun Strowman, Triple H and Kurt Angle (as "Team Raw") to defeat Bobby Roode, John Cena, Randy Orton, Shane McMahon, and Shinsuke Nakamura (as "Team SmackDown") in a Survivor Series match. He went on to feud with The Shield, costing Dean Ambrose and Seth Rollins a Raw Tag Team Championship match against Cesaro and Sheamus and unsuccessfully challenging Roman Reigns for the WWE Intercontinental Championship. In January 2018, Joe suffered a tear to the plantar fascia in his right foot during a match with Titus O'Neil.

Joe returned from injury in April 2018 following WrestleMania 34. At the Greatest Royal Rumble that month, he unsuccessfully challenged Seth Rollins for the Intercontinental Championship in a ladder match also involving Finn Bálor and The Miz. At Backlash in May 2018, Joe lost to Roman Reigns. At Money in the Bank in June 2018, Joe competed in the titular Money in the Bank ladder match, which was won by Braun Strowman. Joe unsuccessfully challenged WWE Champion AJ Styles at SummerSlam in August 2018, at Hell in a Cell in September 2018, a third time at Super Show-Down in October 2018, and a fourth time at Crown Jewel in November 2018. At Survivor Series later that month, Joe teamed with Jeff Hardy, The Miz, Rey Mysterio, and Shane McMahon (as "Team SmackDown") in a loss to Bobby Lashley, Braun Strowman, Dolph Ziggler, Drew McIntyre, and Finn Bálor (as "Team Raw"). In January 2019, Joe competed in the Royal Rumble but was eliminated by Mustafa Ali. At Elimination Chamber in February 2019, Joe unsuccessfully challenged Daniel Bryan for the WWE Championship in an Elimination Chamber match that also included AJ Styles, Jeff Hardy, Kofi Kingston, and Randy Orton.

==== United States Champion; color commentator (2019–2021) ====
On the March 5, 2019 episode of SmackDown Live, Joe defeated R-Truth, Rey Mysterio, and Andrade in a fatal four way match to win the WWE United States Championship. At Fastlane later that month, Joe successfully defended the title in a rematch. At WrestleMania 35 in April 2019, Joe successfully defended the title against Mysterio in a singles match lasting under one minute. At Money in the Bank in May 2019, Joe lost the title to Mysterio. On the June 3 episode of Raw, Mysterio was forced to relinquish the WWE United States Championship due to a separated shoulder, and surrendered the title to Joe. At Stomping Grounds later that month, Joe lost the WWE United States Championship to Ricochet.

The night after losing the United States Championship, Joe attacked WWE Champion Kofi Kingston, leading to a title match at Extreme Rules in July 2019 that was won by Kingston. At the Smackville event later that month, Joe unsuccessfully challenged Kingston for the title in a triple threat match also involving Dolph Ziggler. In August to September 2019, Joe competed in the 2019 King of the Ring tournament, defeating Cesaro in the first round, wrestling Ricochet to a draw in the quarter-finals, and losing to Baron Corbin in the semi-finals in a triple threat match also involving Ricochet. Following the match, Joe became inactive while rehabilitating a broken thumb. While injured, Joe began appearing as a color commentator on the November 18, 2019 episode of Raw (replacing Dio Maddin) as well as appearing on WWE Backstage.

On the December 23, 2019 episode of Raw, Joe was attacked by the Authors of Pain. The following week on Raw, Joe saved Kevin Owens from an attack by the Authors of Pain and Seth Rollins, turning face in the process. Joe returned to the ring in January 2020. Later that month he competed in the Royal Rumble, being eliminated by Rollins. On the February 10 episode of Raw, Joe teamed with Owens and the Viking Raiders in a loss to Rollins, the Authors of Pain, and Murphy; this was his penultimate match with WWE and his last match for 18 months. Later that month, it was reported that Joe had injured his head during a commercial shoot and was not medically cleared to compete. Four days later, Joe was suspended for 30 days for violating the WWE wellness policy.

Joe returned to television on the April 27, 2020 episode of Raw, replacing Jerry Lawler as the Raw color commentator. He was named "Commentator of the Year" for 2020 by CBS Sports. He remained on the Raw commentary team until April 12, 2021, when he was replaced by Corey Graves. He was released by WWE on April 15, 2021.

==== Return to NXT (2021–2022) ====
In June 2021, Joe was rehired by WWE, reportedly at the behest of NXT's head producer Triple H. Joe made his return on the June 15 episode of NXT, being presented as the "enforcer" of NXT's general manager William Regal. Over the next few weeks, Joe feuded with NXT Champion Karrion Kross, leading to a title match at NXT TakeOver 36 in Orlando, Florida on August 22 where Joe defeated Kross to win the NXT Championship for an unprecedented third time. This was Joe's sole match during his 2021 to 2022 run with WWE. On September 12, 2021, Joe relinquished the NXT Championship before making any title defenses; he stated in 2022 that he vacated the title due to a combination of him testing positive for COVID-19 and WWE chairman Vince McMahon wanting to change the overall creative direction of NXT. After recovering from COVID-19, Joe was assigned to work as a trainer backstage. He was released by WWE once again on January 6, 2022, having not reappeared on television since his third reign as NXT Champion.

=== All Elite Wrestling / Ring of Honor (2022–present) ===
==== Championship reigns (2022–2024) ====
Samoa Joe returned to Ring of Honor, now owned by All Elite Wrestling (AEW) co-founder and president Tony Khan, on April 1, 2022, at Supercard of Honor XV, coming to the aid of Jonathan Gresham and Lee Moriarty after they were attacked by Jay Lethal and Sonjay Dutt. Following this, Tony Khan announced that Joe had signed with AEW. On the April 6 episode of AEW Dynamite, Joe made his in-ring AEW debut, defeating Max Caster to qualify for the 2022 Owen Hart Foundation Tournament. On the following episode of AEW Dynamite, Joe defeated Minoru Suzuki to win the ROH World Television Championship, becoming an ROH Triple Crown winner in the process. Joe defeated Johnny Elite in the quarter-finals and Kyle O'Reilly in the semi-finals of the Owen Hart Foundation Tournament before losing to Adam Cole in the final at Double or Nothing due to interference by Bobby Fish.

At Death Before Dishonor in July 2022, Joe successfully defended the ROH World Television Championship against Jay Lethal. Due to their common problems with Lethal, Sonjay Dutt, and Satnam Singh, Joe began teaming with AEW TNT Champion Wardlow as "WarJoe". The duo defeated Josh Woods and Tony Nese at Grand Slam in September 2023. The team broke up due to Joe attacking Wardlow after Powerhouse Hobbs began eyeing Wardlow's TNT Championship, causing Wardlow to unintentionally undermine Joe and his ROH World Television Championship turning heel. This set up a three-way match for the TNT Championship between Joe, Wardlow, and Hobbs at Full Gear in November 2022, where Joe defeated Wardlow and Hobbs to win the TNT Championship, making him a double champion. After winning both television championships, Joe began referring to himself as the "King of Television". On the November 30, 2022 episode of Dynamite, Joe made his first successful TNT Championship defense against AR Fox. The following week on Dynamite, Joe defeated former TNT Champion Darby Allin in another defense. After Joe attacked Allin post-match, Wardlow ran to the ring, causing Joe to flee. At the ROH pay-per-view Final Battle in December 2022, Joe successfully defended the ROH World Television Championship against Juice Robinson. Later that month at Dynamite: New Year's Smash, Joe successfully defended the TNT Championship against Wardlow, then cut off a portion of Wardlow's hair after the match.

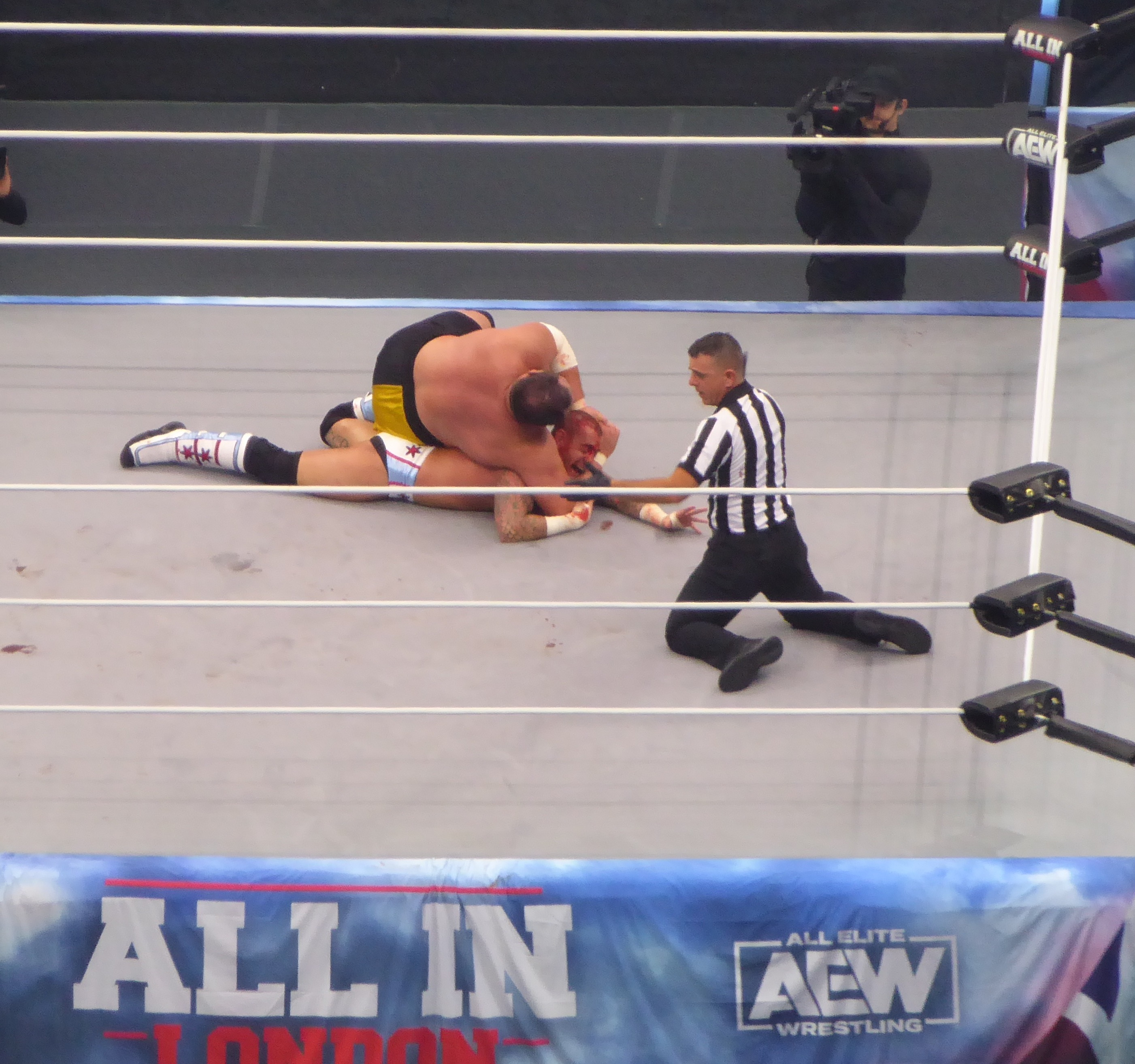
Joe (top) performing an STF on CM Punk at All In in August 2023.

On the January 4, 2023 episode of Dynamite, Joe lost the TNT Championship to Allin, ending his reign at 46 days. On the February 1 episode of Dynamite, Joe regained the title after defeating Allin in a no holds barred match. After the match, he was attacked by a returning Wardlow. Wardlow subsequently defeated Joe to win the TNT Championship at Revolution in March 2023.

Throughout mid-2023, Joe successfully defended the ROH World Television Championship against challengers such as Mark Briscoe, Colt Cabana, Blake Christian, Matt Sydal, and Dalton Castle. In June 2023, he entered the 2023 Owen Hart Foundation Tournament, but was eliminated by CM Punk in the semi-finals the following month.

At All In in August 2023, Joe unsuccessfully challenged CM Punk for the "Real World Championship". The following month at All Out, Joe successfully defended the ROH World Television Championship against Shane Taylor; on his way to the ring, Joe jostled AEW World Champion MJF, leading to a brawl. Subsequently, Joe entered the Grand Slam World Championship Eliminator Tournament, defeating Jeff Hardy in the quarter-finals; Penta El Zero Miedo in the semi-finals; and Roderick Strong in the final; at Grand Slam on September 20, he unsuccessfully challenged MJF for the AEW World Championship. On November 2, Joe became the longest-reigning ROH World Television Champion in history at 574 days. On November 10, 2023, Joe vacated the ROH World Television Championship in order to focus on challenging for the AEW World Championship.

At Full Gear in November 2023, Joe (substituting for the injured Adam Cole) teamed with MJF to successfully defend the ROH World Tag Team Championship against the Gunns. In return for teaming with MJF, Joe was granted a second shot at the AEW World Championship at Worlds End in the Nassau Coliseum in Uniondale, New York in December 2023. The match saw Joe cleanly defeat MJF by technical submission using the Coquina Clutch to win the AEW World Championship. He defeated Hook in his first title defense in January 2024. At Revolution in March 2024, Joe successfully defended his title against "Hangman" Adam Page and Swerve Strickland in a three-way match, submitting Page using the Coquina Clutch. Joe went on to successfully defend his title against Wardlow at AEW Big Business. At AEW Dynasty in April 2024, Joe lost the title to Strickland, ending his reign at 113 days.

==== The Opps (2024–present) ====
In June 2024, Joe formed a tag team with Hook. After a short feud with the Premier Athletes, Joe, Hook, and Katsuyori Shibata defeated Chris Jericho's Learning Tree stable and Jeff Cobb in a trios match at Forbidden Door in June 2024. In July 2024, Joe was removed from the Scotiabank Saddledome in an ambulance after losing a "Stampede Street Fight" to Jericho when Jericho drove him through a wall using a forklift; the angle was used to explain Joe going on hiatus to film season two of Twisted Metal.

Joe returned in January 2025 at AEW Maximum Carnage, saving Hook from an attack by The Patriarchy. In February 2025, the trio of Joe, Hook, and Shibata were dubbed "The Opps". In April 2025, at Dynamite: Spring BreakThru, Joe, Shibata, and Powerhouse Hobbs (substituting for an injured Hook) defeated the Death Riders for the AEW World Trios Championship. The next night at Collision: Spring BreakThru, Joe inducted Hobbs as a member of The Opps. On May 14 at Dynamite: Beach Break, Joe unsuccessfully challenged Death Riders leader Jon Moxley for the AEW World Championship in a steel cage match. On May 25 at Double or Nothing, The Opps teamed with Kenny Omega, Swerve Strickland, and Willow Nightingale to defeat the Death Riders and The Young Bucks in an Anarchy in the Arena match. On July 12 at All In, The Opps successfully defended the AEW World Trios Championship against the Death Riders and Gabe Kidd. After the match, Joe was attacked by the Death Riders and stretchered off; the angle was used to allow Joe to go on hiatus to promote season two of Twisted Metal. Joe returned the following month, with the Opps successfully defending the AEW World Trios Championship against Bullet Club War Dogs at Forbidden Door: London. At All Out in September 2025, Joe and Hobbs defeated the WorkHorsemen (Anthony Henry and JD Drake). In the same month, Hook returned from injury but departed The Opps.

On the October 1, 2025 episode of Dynamite, Joe and Hobbs teamed with AEW World Champion "Hangman" Adam Page to defeat the Death Riders. Following the match, an argument broke out between Joe and Page, leading Page to challenge Joe to a match for Page's World Championship at WrestleDream later that month. After Page defeated Joe at WrestleDream, Joe and the rest of the Opps turned heel and attacked Page, leading to a rematch at Full Gear on November 22, 2025, where Joe defeated Page in a steel cage match with the assistance of Hook, winning the AEW World Championship for a second time. On December 10 at Dynamite: Winter is Coming, Joe successfully defended his title against Eddie Kingston. On December 27 at Worlds End, Joe defended the AEW World Championship against Page, MJF, and Swerve Strickland in a four-way match; MJF pinned him to win the title, ending his second reign after 35 days.

On the January 14, 2026 taping of Collision: Maximum Carnage, the Opps lost the AEW World Trios Championship to Adam Page and JetSpeed; the bout aired on tape delay on January 17. Later that month, Joe sustained an injury in training. He returned from injury on the April 22 episode of Dynamite. Joe then entered the Owen Hart Cup, but lost to Will Ospreay in the quarterfinals at Double or Nothing on May 24. After Double or Nothing, Joe took another hiatus, this time to film an undisclosed project. He returned on September 26 at the Saturday Tailgate Brawl edition of All Out, confronting Jack Perry who had been calling out Joe in the previous weeks. On October 6 at Grand Slam France, Joe defeated Perry to qualify for the Clockwork Carnage match at WrestleDream for the AEW World Championship. At the event on October 17, Joe failed to capture his third AEW World Championship.

== Professional wrestling style and persona ==
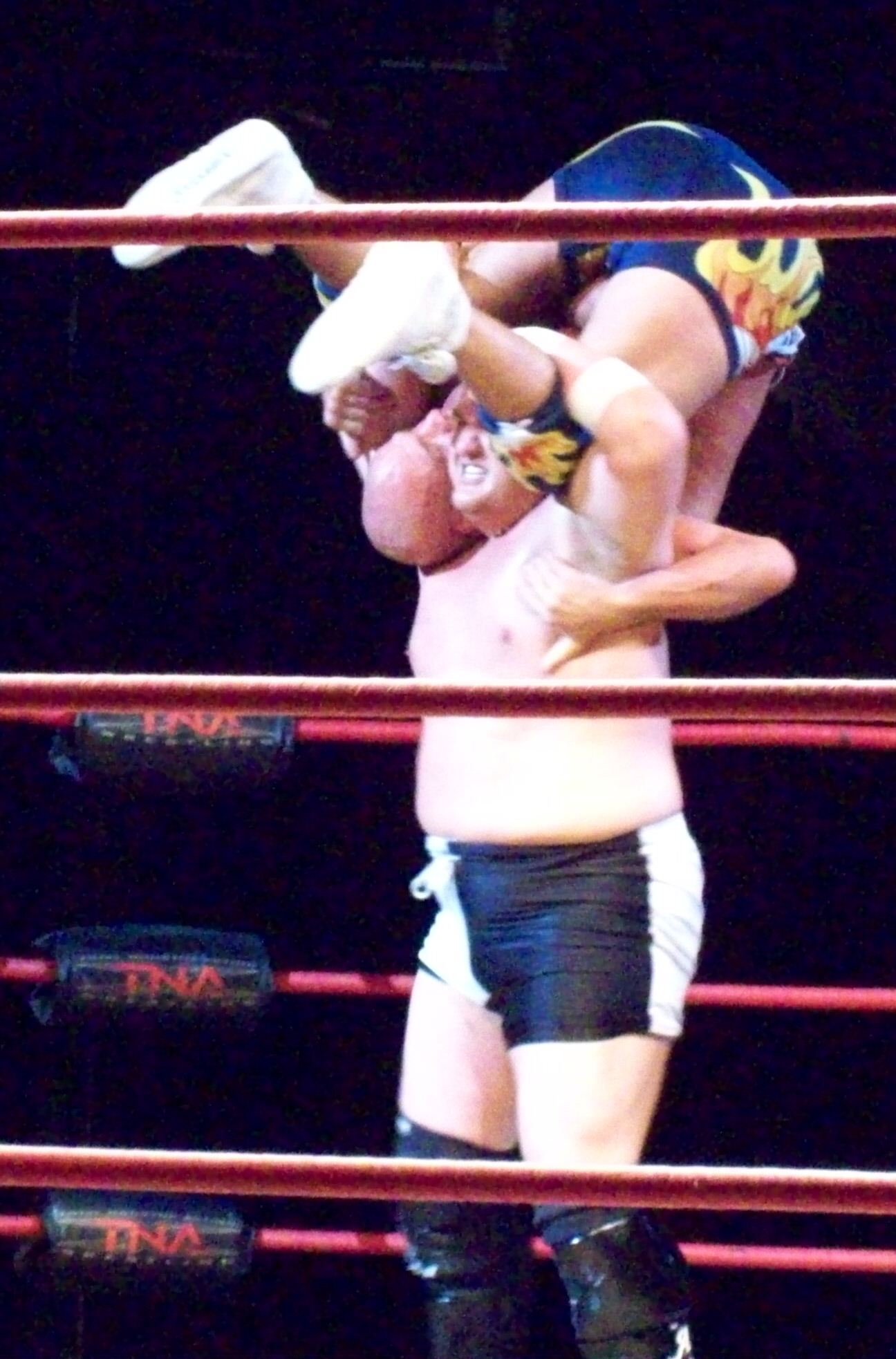
Joe (bottom) performing a muscle buster on Kurt Angle in September 2008.

Samoa Joe wrestles in a "technician" and "powerhouse" style, with "blistering, MMA-inspired offense". Ring of Honor described him as "one of the hardest-hitting and most intense competitors in the sport". His signature moves include the "Coquina Clutch" (a rear naked choke), the "Coquina Plex" (a sleeper suplex), the facewash, the "Island Driver" (a sitout side powerslam), the muscle buster, the "Olé Kick" (a Yakuza kick), the STF, the "STJoe" (an STO), and the uranage. Joe is also known for a maneuver colloquially dubbed the "nope spot", which sees him casually walk out of the way of an opponent executing an aerial maneuver.

Joe's ring attire typically comprises shorts colored black and gold, green, or red, along with black knee pads, athletic tape on his left fist, and a towel draped around his neck.

Joe's use of submission holds saw him nicknamed the "Samoan Submission Machine". In 2022, after winning the AEW TNT Championship and ROH World Television Championship, Joe began referring to himself as the "King of Television".

For much of his career, Joe used the opening riff of Godzilla vs. Mothra by Akira Ifukube as part of his entrance.

== Other media ==
In 2006, Joe made brief appearances on the American version of the television show Distraction, participating in a round where wrestlers performed moves on contestants while they answered questions. In June 2022, Joe was announced as doing the physical performance of the character Sweet Tooth for Peacock's adaptation of Twisted Metal (the character was voiced by Will Arnett). Joe has voiced characters in the animated web series Transformers: Power of the Primes and video games including Dota 2, Dota Underlords, Game of Thrones, Suicide Squad: Kill the Justice League and Like a Dragon: Pirate Yakuza in Hawaii.

In April 2014, Joe launched a video game streaming channel on Twitch. He has appeared on Rob Van Dam's web-based reality show RVD TV numerous times. In 2023, Joe appeared on the Doughboys podcast, reviewing Taco Bell.

In 2026, a 2005 bout between Joe and Necro Butcher was the subject of an episode of season seven of the documentary series Dark Side of the Ring.

=== Filmography ===
==== Television ====
Year	Title	Role	Notes
2018	Transformers: Power of the Primes	Predaking	Voice; 4 episodes
2023–present	Twisted Metal	Marcus "Needles" Kane / Sweet Tooth	Physical performance only, dubbed by Will Arnett

==== Video games ====
Year	Title	Role	Notes
2013	Dota 2	Juggernaut	
2014	Game of Thrones	Beast	
2020	Dota Underlords	Juggernaut	
2024	Suicide Squad: Kill the Justice League	Nanaue / King Shark	
2025	Like a Dragon: Pirate Yakuza in Hawaii	Raymond Law	
TBA	Deadlock	Abrams	

== Personal life ==
Seanoa married his wife, Jessica, in 2007, with whom he has two children. He is a devout Christian. He is close friends with fellow wrestlers CM Punk, Homicide, Christopher Daniels, AJ Styles, and Rob Van Dam.

Seanoa is of Samoan descent; unlike many Samoan wrestlers, he is not part of the Anoaʻi family.

Seanoa avidly trains in Brazilian jiu-jitsu, judo, and Muay Thai. He was often noted as a sparring partner for Team Punishment member Justin McCully, and was often in attendance in the locker room for Team Punishment fighters such as Tito Ortiz and Kendall Grove.

== Championships and accomplishments ==
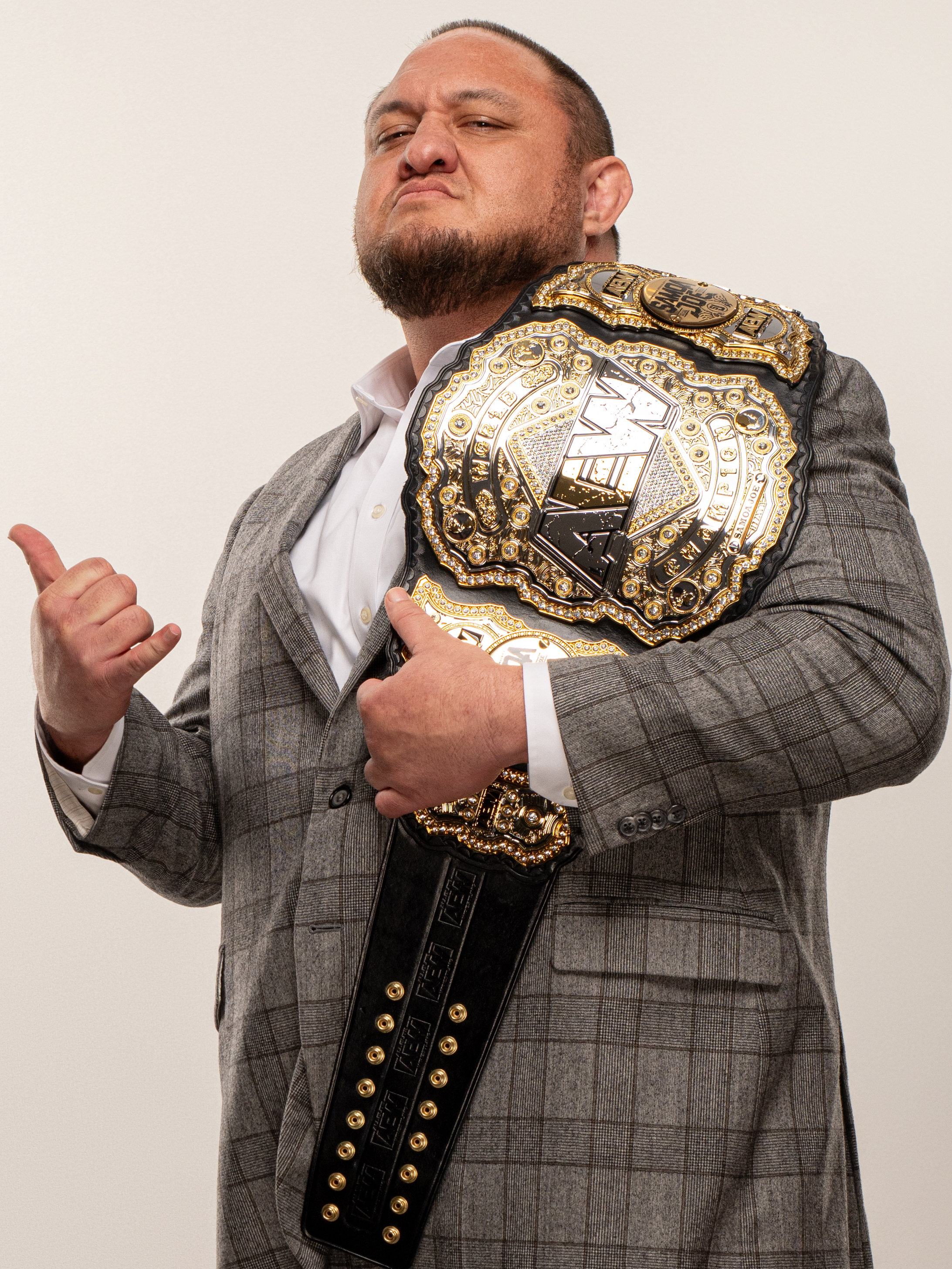
Samoa Joe has held the AEW World Championship twice...

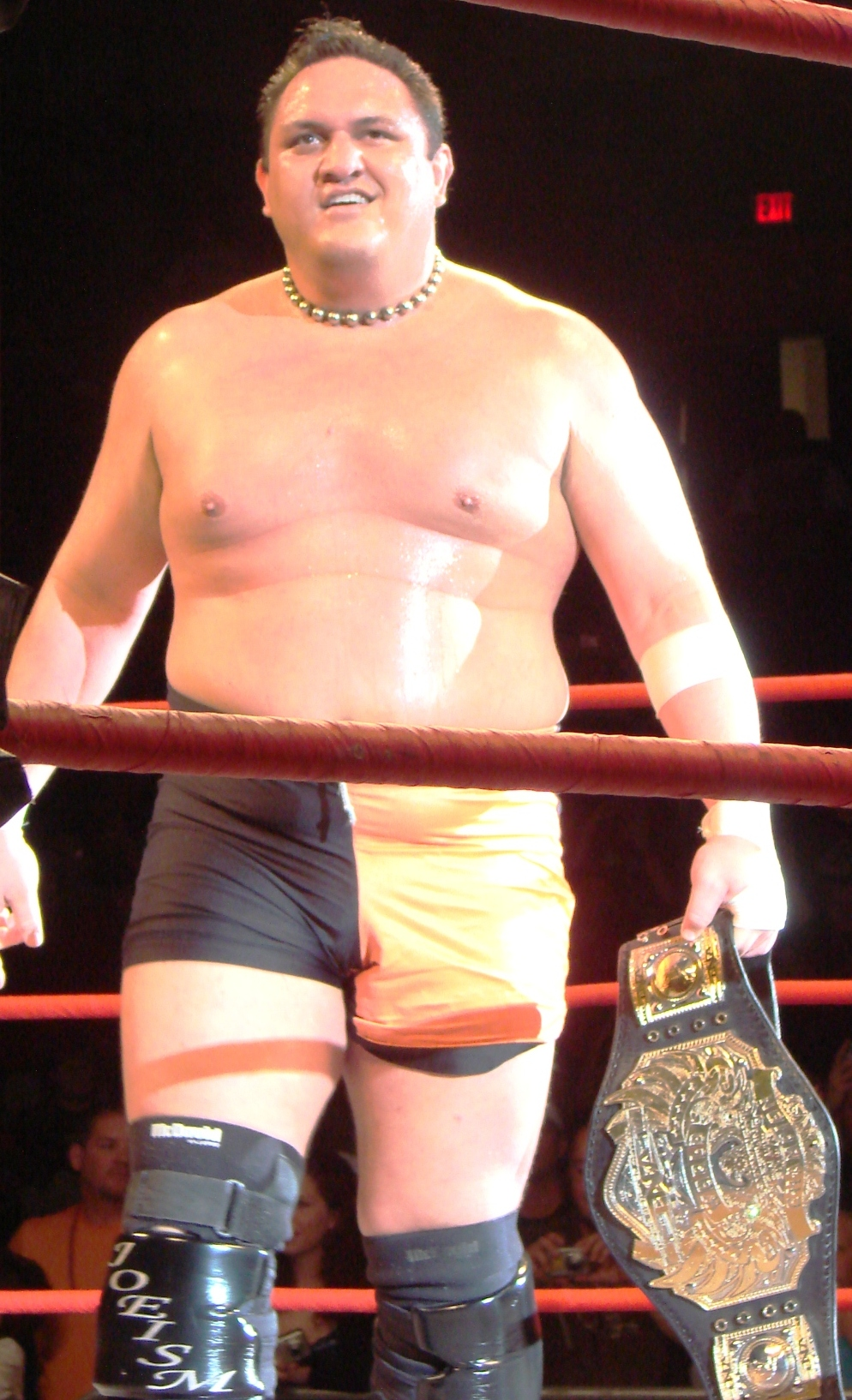
...as well as the TNA World Heavyweight Championship...

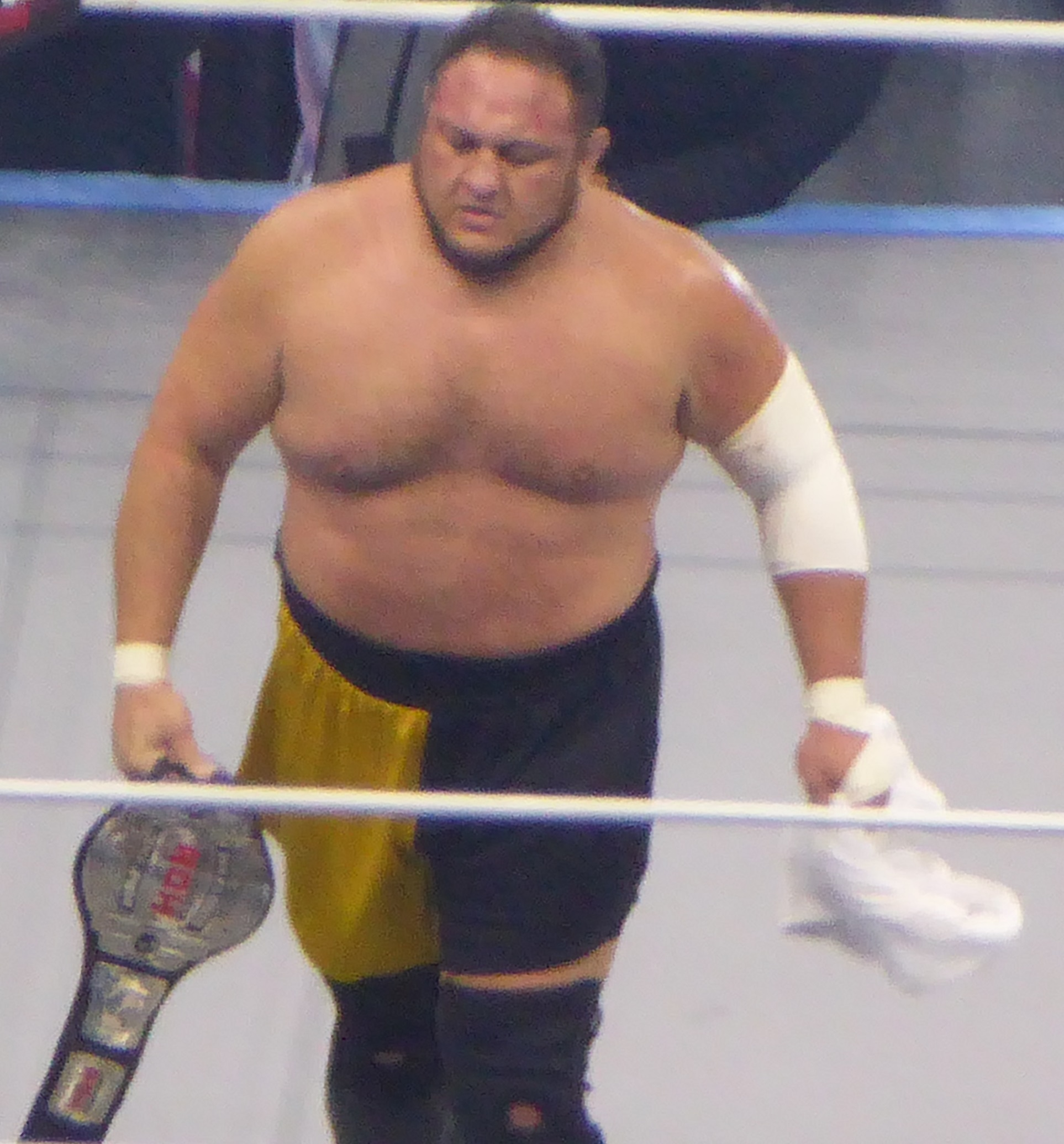
...he is also a former ROH World Television Champion, being the longest reigning champion at 574 days...

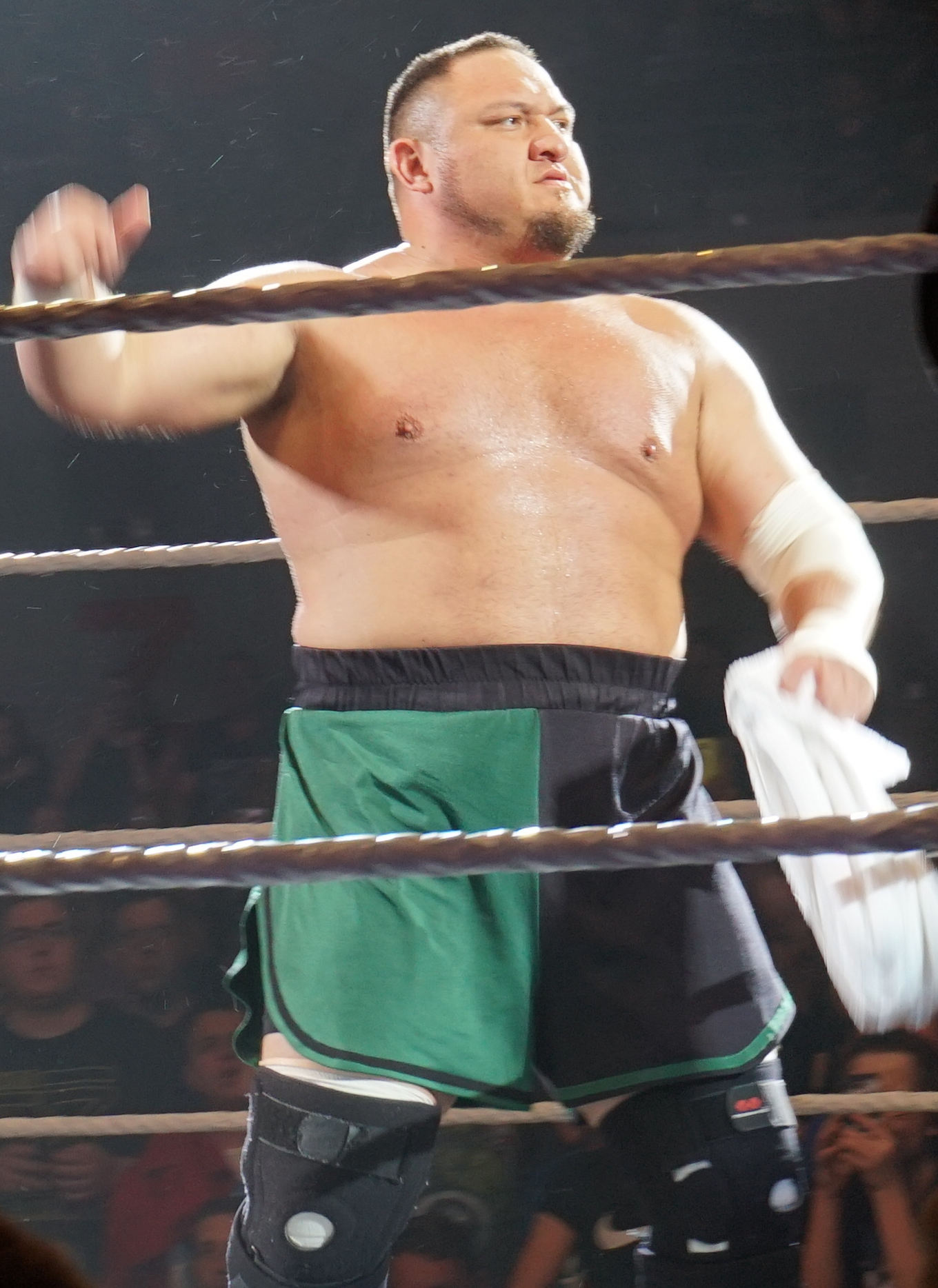
...and is also a one-time AEW World Trios Champion.

- All Elite Wrestling
  - AEW World Championship (2 times)
  - AEW TNT Championship (2 times)
  - AEW World Trios Championship (1 time) - with Katsuyori Shibata and Powerhouse Hobbs
  - Grand Slam World Championship Eliminator Tournament (2023)
- Ballpark Brawl
  - Natural Heavyweight Championship (1 time)
- CBS Sports
  - Commentator of the Year (2020)
  - Smack Talker of the Year (2018)
- Extreme Wrestling Federation
  - Xtreme 8 Tournament (2006)
- IWA Mid-South
  - Revolution Strong Style Tournament (2004)
- German Wrestling Association
  - GWA Heavyweight Championship (1 time)
- Pro Wrestling Illustrated
  - PWI Feud of the Year (2007) versus Kurt Angle
  - PWI Most Popular Wrestler of the Year (2006)
  - Ranked number 4 of the top 500 singles wrestlers in the PWI 500 in 2006 and 2008
- Pro Wrestling Noah
  - GHC Tag Team Championship (1 time) – with Magnus
- Pro Wrestling Zero-One
  - NWA Intercontinental Tag Team Championship (1 time) (Note: After the title was vacated, Joe and Sakoda's reign was stricken from the promotion's records.) – with Keiji Sakoda
- Ring of Honor
  - ROH Hall of Fame (class of 2022)
  - ROH Pure Championship (1 time)
  - ROH Triple Crown Champion (seventh)
  - ROH World Championship (1 time)
  - ROH World Television Championship (1 time)
- SoCal Uncensored
  - Rookie of the Year (2000)
- Total Nonstop Action Wrestling
  - Feast or Fired (2009 – World Heavyweight Championship contract)
  - Gauntlet for the Gold (2007 – TNA World Heavyweight Championship)
  - King of the Mountain (2008)
  - Maximum Impact Tournament (2011)
  - Super X Cup (2005)
  - TNA Grand Slam Champion (third)
  - TNA Television Championship (1 time)
  - TNA Triple Crown Champion (third)
  - TNA Turkey Bowl (2007)
  - TNA World Heavyweight Championship (1 time)
  - TNA World Tag Team Championship (2 times) – by himself (1 time) (Note: Joe held the title by himself during his first reign.) and with Magnus (1 time)
  - TNA X Division Championship (5 times)
  - TNA X Division Championship Tournament (2014)
  - TNA Year End Awards (6 times)
    - Mr. TNA (2006, 2007)
    - X-Division Star of the Year (2006)
    - Feud of the Year (2006, 2007) versus Kurt Angle
    - Finisher of the Year 2007 muscle buster
  - Wild Card Tournament (2011) – with Magnus
- Twin Wrestling Entertainment
  - TWE Heavyweight Championship (1 time)
- Ultimate Pro Wrestling
  - UPW Heavyweight Championship (1 time)
  - UPW No Holds Barred Championship (1 time)
- Wrestling Observer Newsletter
  - Best Brawler (2005, 2006)
  - Most Outstanding Wrestler (2005)
  - Pro Wrestling Match of the Year (2005) versus Kenta Kobashi
- WWE
  - Dusty Rhodes Tag Team Classic (2015) – with Finn Bálor
  - NXT Championship (3 times)
  - WWE United States Championship (2 times)
