= Ken Pavia =

American former sports agent

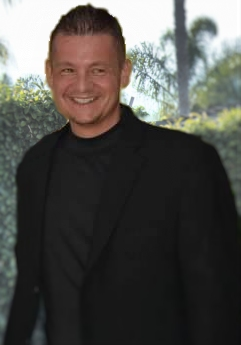
- Pavia in June 2013
- Born: Kenneth W. Pavia Jr. August 8, 1966 (age 59); Rochester, New York, U.S.

Ken Pavia is a former sports agent, founder of the Huntington Beach, California based sports agency MMAagents and the former CEO of India’s first MMA Promotion Super Fight League. From 2005 to September 2011 Pavia represented a client roster of 75 professional mixed martial artists at MMAagents, most of whom competed in top tier mixed martial arts promotions such as the Ultimate Fighting Championship (UFC), World Extreme Cagefighting (WEC), Pride Fighting Championships, Strikeforce, DREAM, and Bellator Fighting Championship.

In September 2011, Pavia announced that he had sold the majority of the assets in his company, MMAagents, to Paradigm Sports Management but he would be staying on as a consultant during the transition. In an interview with MMAJunkie regarding the sale of MMAagents Pavia was quoted as saying: 'It was a move that was good for everybody involved, so we took the jump.'

== Early years ==
Pavia is an American of Italian descent who was born in Rochester, New York in 1966. In 1978 he relocated to Hilton Head Island, South Carolina where he attended prep school at Sea Pines Academy. He obtained his collegiate undergraduate degree from the University of California Los Angeles in 1989 where he was the goalie on the Pac-10 champion ice hockey team. Pavia then attended the University of Miami School of Law, graduating in 1991. Soon thereafter, Pavia opened Fiduciary Management Group and began his career in athlete representation.

Prior to venturing into the mixed martial arts industry, Pavia enjoyed a twelve-year career representing athletes in both the National Hockey League and Major League Baseball.

== Mixed Martial Arts Agency ==
Pavia’s career representing professional mixed martial artists began on May 9, 2005 when he was approached by former UFC heavyweight champion Ricco Rodriguez with the request that Pavia assume his representation. Pavia, who had been a fan of mixed martial arts from the time he purchased UFC 1, agreed and thus began the career that would lead to the creation of MMAagents. Soon afterwards, former WEC Champion Razor Rob McCullough became a client and moved into Pavia's home in Huntington Beach, California where he resided for four years. Pavia formerly wrote a bi-monthly article for Versus.com, is frequently published on MMAjunkie.com, is a regular lectured at the USC Marshall School of Business for the past 4 years and has been selected as the 'agent expert' lecturer for the annual MMA Fight Summit.

MMAagents represented over 55 fighters, the majority of whom fought in the UFC, Strikeforce, and Bellator. In 2010 MMAagents' clients competed in over 192 fights in 60 different organizations in 18 countries, and Pavia or MMAagents' employees attended virtually every event. Due to the nature of representing international clients, Pavia is sometimes required to take calls at all hours of the day. He also claimed to fly over 150,000 miles in 2010 and 2011 and 200,000 in 2012 for mixed martial arts.

== Takedown Fight Media ==
Following the sale of MMAagents to Paradigm Sports, Pavia joined forces with Takedown Fight Media—an ambitious live-event and post-production project spearheaded by Steve Everitt and Dino Minichiello. Takedown's aim was to shine a light on MMA events and fighters that seldom received attention, weaving high-end filming and production value into a package that would be sold and distributed to networks across the globe. Pavia came on board as Director of Business Development and Takedown quickly landed the participation of more than 30 international MMA organizations.

== Super Fight League ==
On January 1, 2012, Pavia was named as CEO of the Super Fight League (SFL), India's first major mixed martial arts promotion founded by celebrity entrepreneur IPL cricket team owner Raj Kundra and Bollywood mega star Sanjay Dutt.

Featuring a mix of big name International fighters such as Bob Sapp, Bobby Lashley, Alexander Shlemenko, Trevor Prangley and James Thompson alongside domestic Indian talent, each SFL event also features one female fight per card. Pavia can often be seen on broadcast congratulating the fighters in the cage or joining the commentary team to offer his opinion. Speaking about SFL 3 which took place on Sunday 6 May and was headlined by James Thompson v Bobby Lashley, Pavia has been quoted as saying that SFL’s ‘international card [was] the best that has been offered outside of North America this year.’

On March 9 it was announced that SFL had signed a deal with COLORS TV in India to broadcast its events. In an interview given to Bleacher Report on April 3, 2012, Pavia stated that the TV deal with COLORS means that SFL will reach 500 million homes.

Pavia was successful in landing coverage for the SFL on the front page of the largest english language newspaper in the world, the Mumbai Times where he was frequently quoted.

In September 2012 Pavia resigned his position as the CEO of the SFL citing "family reasons." Fighters Only magazine reported that his mom had cancer and he was expecting his first child at the age of 46.

== MMA Promotion Consulting ==
Since the sale of his agency, Pavia has been consulting with international MMA promotions in countries including India, Bulgaria, Serbia, Finland, Costa Rica, Abu Dhabi, Dubai, and Russia. He has been hired to assist with promotions that are in the concept phase as well as existing promotions, and brings in systems and processes that improve and grow the events. On two occasions Pavia was invited to events by Russian president Vladimir Putin and met with him to strategize how to grow the sport of MMA in Russia. In a recent interview Carson's Corner Radio Show he claimed to have traveled to 42 countries and attended MMA events in 32 of them.

== Television appearances ==
Pavia has appeared four times as a panel member on the weekly HDNet program "Inside MMA". The program is hosted by Bas Rutten, Kenny Rice, and Ron Kruck. During his appearances on "Inside MMA" Pavia provides his expert insight on the current events surrounding the world of mixed martial arts. He has also been seen on The Dating Game (twice), Studs, an ESPN Game Show, The Geraldo Rivera Show, Celebrity Rehab, Fight Zone Presents, and numerous commercials.

== Notable clients ==
Ken Pavia represents, or has represented "Razor" Rob McCullough, Ricco Rodriguez, Cris "Cyborg" Santos, Brett "The Grim" Rodgers, Anthony "Rumble" Johnson, Alexander "Storm" Shlmenko, Benji "The Razor" Radach, Chris "Lights Out" Lytle, Joe "Diesel" Riggs, David "The Crow" Loiseau, Karo "The Heat" Parisyan, Jay "Thoroughbred" Heiron, Martin "Hitman" Kampmann, Phil "NYBA" Baroni, Mike "Megatron" Pierce, Tiki Ghosn, and War Machine Outside of MMA, Pavia's clients included NHL Mighty Duck leading scorer Terry Yake, Major League baseball players Jerry Spradlin, Keith Ginter, and Professional Bodybuilder Jay Cutler
