= Team Punishment =

Mixed martial arts training organization in California

Punishment Training Center
- Est.: 1999
- Founded by: Tito Ortiz
- Primary trainers: Tito Ortiz; Freddie Roach
- Past titleholders: Tito Ortiz Light-Heavyweight Champion (UFC 2000–2003) 205 lb (93 kg; 14.6 st) Quinton Jackson Light-Heavyweight Champion Champion (UFC 2007–2008) 205 lb (93 kg; 14.6 st) Ricco Rodriguez Heavyweight Champion 265 lb (120 kg; 18.9 st) (UFC 2002–2003) Rob McCullough lightweight Champion (WEC 2007–2008)
- Training facilities: (United States) Huntington Beach, California
- Website: Punishment Athletics Official Website; Santa Ana, California

Punishment Training Center is a mixed martial arts training camp founded in 1999 by Tito Ortiz. Also known as Punishment Athletics, the training center is headquartered in Huntington Beach, California, with a training camp located in Big Bear, California.

From the team’s founding until now, the team has maintained a rivalry with the Lion's Den Academy, mostly played out through the three matches between Tito Ortiz and Lion’s Den founder and UFC Hall of Famer Ken Shamrock.

== MMA fighters ==
- Tito Ortiz (Former UFC Light Heavyweight Champion)
- Tiki Ghosn (UFC veteran)
- Justin McCully (UFC veteran)
- Rob McCullough (Former WEC Lightweight Champion)
- Rob Emerson (VFC Bantamweight and Featherweight Champion)
- Carlo Prater (Former PFC Lightweight Champion)
- Jake O'Brien (UFC veteran)
- Saul Soliz (MMA Trainer)
- Ken Pavia (MMA Agent)
- Cris "Cyborg" Justino (Former UFC Women's Featherweight Champion)

Chad Beverly New Era Fighting 2007 World's Toughest

- Ricco Rodriguez (Former UFC Heavyweight Champion)
- Quinton "Rampage" Jackson (Former UFC Light Heavyweight Champion)
- Phil Baroni
- Melvin Guillard
- Josh Burkman
- Kendall Grove
- Matt Hamill
- Jason "Mayhem" Miller
- Kay Hansen
