= Justin McCully =

American mixed martial artist and professional wrestler

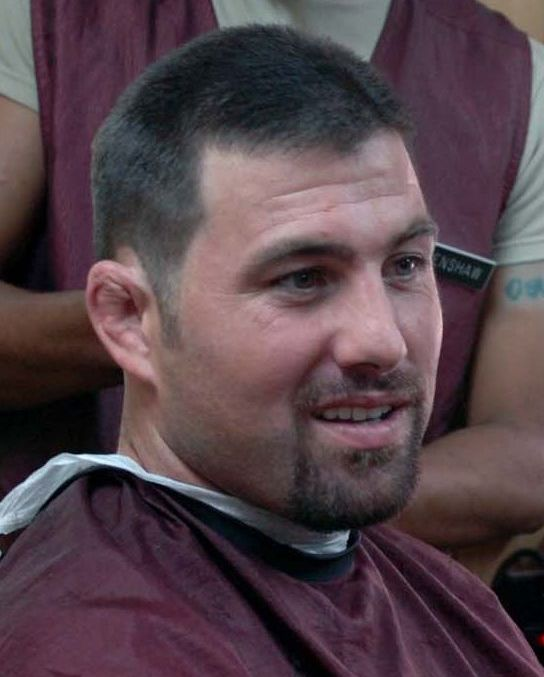
- Born: February 18, 1976 (age 50); Washington DC, United States
- Other names: Justin Sane (In professional wrestling); The Nsane1 (in mixed martial arts)
- Height: 6 ft 2 in (1.88 m)
- Weight: 238 lb (108 kg; 17.0 st)
- Division: Heavyweight
- Reach: 74 in (190 cm)
- Fighting out of: Maui, Hawaii, United States
- Team: Team Punishment
- Years active: 1997–2011

Mixed martial arts record
- Total: 18
- Wins: 11
- By knockout: 1
- By submission: 6
- By decision: 4
- Losses: 5
- By submission: 4
- By decision: 1
- Draws: 2

Other information
- Mixed martial arts record from Sherdog

Justin McCully (born February 18, 1976) is a retired American professional mixed martial artist and professional wrestler who most recently competed in the Heavyweight division of the RFA. A professional competitor since 1997, McCully has also formerly competed for the UFC, RINGS, Pancrase, It's Showtime and Jungle Fight.

== Mixed martial arts career ==
McCully trains with Team Punishment, including Tito Ortiz, Kendall Grove, and professional wrestler Samoa Joe. McCully also trained with B.J. Penn in Hilo for Penn's bout with Georges St-Pierre at UFC 94. He has three previous fights inside the UFC, a unanimous decision victory over Antoni Hardonk at UFC Fight Night 9, a submission loss to Gabriel Gonzaga at UFC 86, and a unanimous decision win over Eddie Sanchez at UFC: Fight For The Troops. McCully was also scheduled to fight Christian Wellisch at UFC 76, but McCully was ultimately replaced by Scott Junk. He has also fought a former UFC champion, losing to Evan Tanner by technical submission at a 1998 Pancrase event.

McCully competed against Gabriel Gonzaga at UFC 86. He lost by submission to Gonzaga applying an Americana keylock from the mounted position in the first round.

He then fought Eddie Sanchez at UFC: Fight for the Troops and won the fight by unanimous decision. Most recently, McCully lost to Mike Russow at UFC 102 via unanimous decision.

After his defeat at the hands of Mike Russow at UFC 102, McCully was released by the organization.

== Personal life ==
Justin has two children, and is also good friends with professional wrestler Rob Van Dam. In 2014 he had a falling out with Tito Ortiz over what McCully claimed was Ortiz owing him money and refusing to pay him back. This fallout culminated with McCully openly supporting and training with Stephan Bonnar who was Ortiz' opponent at Bellator 131. McCully's brother, Sean, is a former professional kickboxer and MMA fighter.

== Mixed martial arts record ==
Professional record breakdown
18 matches	11 wins	5 losses
By knockout	1	0
By submission	6	4
By decision	4	1
Draws	2	

Res.	Record	Opponent	Method	Event	Date	Round	Time	Location	Notes
Win	11–5–2	Justin Grizzard	TKO (punches)	RFA 1: Elliot vs. Pulver	December 16, 2011	1	2:45	Kearney, Nebraska, United States	
Loss	10–5–2	Mike Russow	Decision (unanimous)	UFC 102	August 29, 2009	3	5:00	Portland, Oregon, United States	
Win	10–4–2	Eddie Sanchez	Decision (unanimous)	UFC: Fight For The Troops	December 10, 2008	3	5:00	Fayetteville, North Carolina, United States	
Loss	9–4–2	Gabriel Gonzaga	Submission (americana)	UFC 86	July 5, 2008	1	1:57	Las Vegas, Nevada, United States	
Win	9–3–2	Antoni Hardonk	Decision (unanimous)	UFC Fight Night: Stevenson vs. Guillard	April 5, 2007	3	5:00	Las Vegas, Nevada, United States	
Win	8–3–2	Ruben Villareal	Submission (front choke)	Valor Fighting: San Manuel	October 26, 2006	1	3:48	San Bernardino, California, United States	
Win	7–3–2	Derek Thornton	Submission (rear-naked choke)	Extreme Wars 5: Battlegrounds	October 6, 2006	1	2:20	Honolulu, Hawaii, United States	
Win	6–3–2	Ed de Kruijf	Submission (armbar)	Venom: First Strike	September 18, 2004	1	0:48	Huntington Beach, California, United States	
Win	5–3–2	Dario Amorim	Decision (unanimous)	Jungle Fight 1	September 13, 2003	3	5:00	Manaus, Brazil	
Loss	4–3–2	Ed de Kruijf	Submission (reverse full-nelson)	It's Showtime: Exclusive	October 22, 2000	1	2:36	Haarlem, Netherlands	
Win	4–2–2	Errol Maduro	Submission	UFO Europe: Free Fight Gala	November 28, 1999	N/A	N/A	Kijkduin, Netherlands	
Loss	3–2–2	Mikhail Ilyukhin	Technical Submission (achilles lock)	RINGS: King of Kings 1999 Block A	October 28, 1999	1	4:48	Tokyo, Japan	
Win	3–1–2	Mario Neto	Submission (kneebar)	WVC 9: World Vale Tudo Championship 9	September 27, 1999	1	1:53	Aruba	
Loss	2–1–2	Evan Tanner	Technical Submission (kimura)	Pancrase: 1998 Neo-Blood Tournament, Round 2	July 26, 1998	1	5:07	Aomori, Japan	
Win	2–0–2	Martin Emmen	Submission (armbar)	Pancrase: 1998 Neo-Blood Tournament, Round 1	July 7, 1998	1	1:34	Tokyo, Japan	
Win	1–0–2	Daisuke Ishii	Decision (unanimous)	Pancrase: 1998 Neo-Blood Tournament, Round 1	July 7, 1998	2	3:00	Tokyo, Japan	
Draw	0–0–2	Daisuke Ishii	Draw (unanimous)	Pancrase: Alive 4	March 18, 1998	2	3:00	Tokyo, Japan	
Draw	0–0–1	Kenji Akiyama	Draw	Daidojuku: Wars 4	March 11, 1997	5	3:00	Tokyo, Japan	

== Championships and accomplishments in professional wrestling ==
- World Wrestling Council
  - WWC World Junior Heavyweight Championship (1 time)
- International Wrestling Association
  - IWA Intercontinental Heavyweight Championship (1 time)
- Ultimate Pro Wrestling
  - UPW Tag Team Championship (2 times) - with Hardkore Kidd
