= Jerry Korab =

Canadian ice hockey player (born 1948)

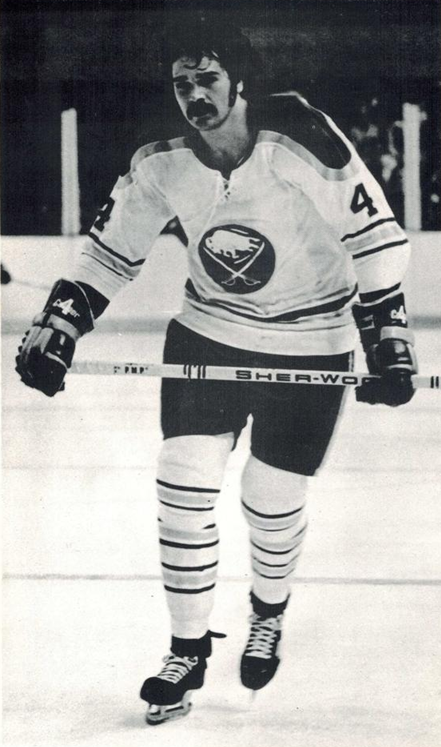
- Born: September 15, 1948 (age 77) Sault Ste. Marie, Ontario, Canada
- Height: 6 ft 3 in (191 cm)
- Weight: 220 lb (100 kg; 15 st 10 lb)
- Position: Defence
- Shot: Left
- Played for: Chicago Black Hawks; Vancouver Canucks; Buffalo Sabres; Los Angeles Kings
- NHL draft: Undrafted
- Playing career: 1971–1985

Gerald Joseph Korab (born September 15, 1948) is a Canadian former professional ice hockey player, who was a defenceman in the National Hockey League (NHL) from 1971 to 1985. Korab was born in Sault Ste. Marie, Ontario.

Nicknamed "King Kong", Korab made a solid reputation for himself in the 1970s era NHL as a physical defenceman. His size gave him a distinct advantage in his zone, and he possessed a hard shot and some offensive skills.

Making his NHL debut with the Chicago Black Hawks in 1970–71, Korab was asked to keep the front of his net clear. He continued to play the same role for the next two seasons while scoring 12 goals in 1972–73 and helping Chicago reach the Stanley Cup Final in 1971 and 1973.

Korab's best years were spent on the blueline of the Buffalo Sabres from 1973 to 1980, where he blossomed into an effective defenceman on one of the best young teams in the league. He was a physical presence while hitting double-digits in goals four times, helping the Sabres reach their first Stanley Cup Final in 1975. He was selected to play in the NHL All-Star Games in 1975 and 1976. During this period, he also established himself as the NHL's "best dressed player" for three years running, beginning with his time with the Vancouver Canucks during the 1973–74 season, when he became a fan of designer and master tailor Paul Minichiello.

Korab was traded to the Los Angeles Kings on March 10, 1980, for a first-round draft choice that Buffalo used to select offensive defenceman Phil Housley. In 1983, he retired but two months into the season he was offered a chance to make a comeback with the Sabres. He would retire for good after playing 25 games with the Sabres in 1984–85.

Korab owns and operates Korab Inc., a packaging service located in Bellwood, Illinois.

== Career statistics ==
			Regular season					Playoffs
Season	Team	League	GP	G	A	Pts	PIM	GP	G	A	Pts	PIM
1966–67	St. Catharines Black Hawks	OHA-Jr.	43	3	10	13	57	4	0	1	1	12
1967–68	St. Catharines Black Hawks	OHA-Jr.	54	10	34	44	244	5	0	3	3	26
1968–69	Port Huron Flags	IHL	71	18	46	64	284	—	—	—	—	—
1969–70	Portland Buckaroos	WHL	65	9	12	21	169	—	—	—	—	—
1970–71	Chicago Black Hawks	NHL	46	4	14	18	152	7	1	0	1	20
1970–71	Portland Buckaroos	WHL	20	3	5	8	78	—	—	—	—	—
1971–72	Chicago Black Hawks	NHL	73	9	5	14	95	8	0	1	1	20
1972–73	Chicago Black Hawks	NHL	77	12	15	27	94	15	0	0	0	22
1973–74	Vancouver Canucks	NHL	31	4	7	11	64	—	—	—	—	—
1973–74	Buffalo Sabres	NHL	45	6	12	18	73	—	—	—	—	—
1974–75	Buffalo Sabres	NHL	79	12	44	56	184	16	3	2	5	32
1975–76	Buffalo Sabres	NHL	65	13	28	41	85	9	1	3	4	12
1976–77	Buffalo Sabres	NHL	77	14	33	47	120	6	2	4	6	8
1977–78	Buffalo Sabres	NHL	77	7	34	41	119	8	0	5	5	6
1978–79	Buffalo Sabres	NHL	78	11	40	51	104	3	1	0	1	4
1979–80	Buffalo Sabres	NHL	43	1	10	11	74	—	—	—	—	—
1979–80	Los Angeles Kings	NHL	11	1	2	3	34	3	0	1	1	11
1980–81	Los Angeles Kings	NHL	78	9	43	52	139	4	0	0	0	33
1981–82	Los Angeles Kings	NHL	50	5	13	18	91	10	0	2	2	26
1982–83	Los Angeles Kings	NHL	72	3	26	29	90	—	—	—	—	—
1983–84	Buffalo Sabres	NHL	48	2	9	11	82	3	0	0	0	5
1983–84	Rochester Americans	AHL	4	0	4	4	2	—	—	—	—	—
1984–85	Buffalo Sabres	NHL	25	1	6	7	29	1	0	0	0	2
1984–85	Rochester Americans	AHL	3	1	2	3	6	—	—	—	—	—
NHL totals			975	114	341	455	1,629	93	8	18	26	201
