= Paul Minichiello =

Italian master tailor (1940-2014)

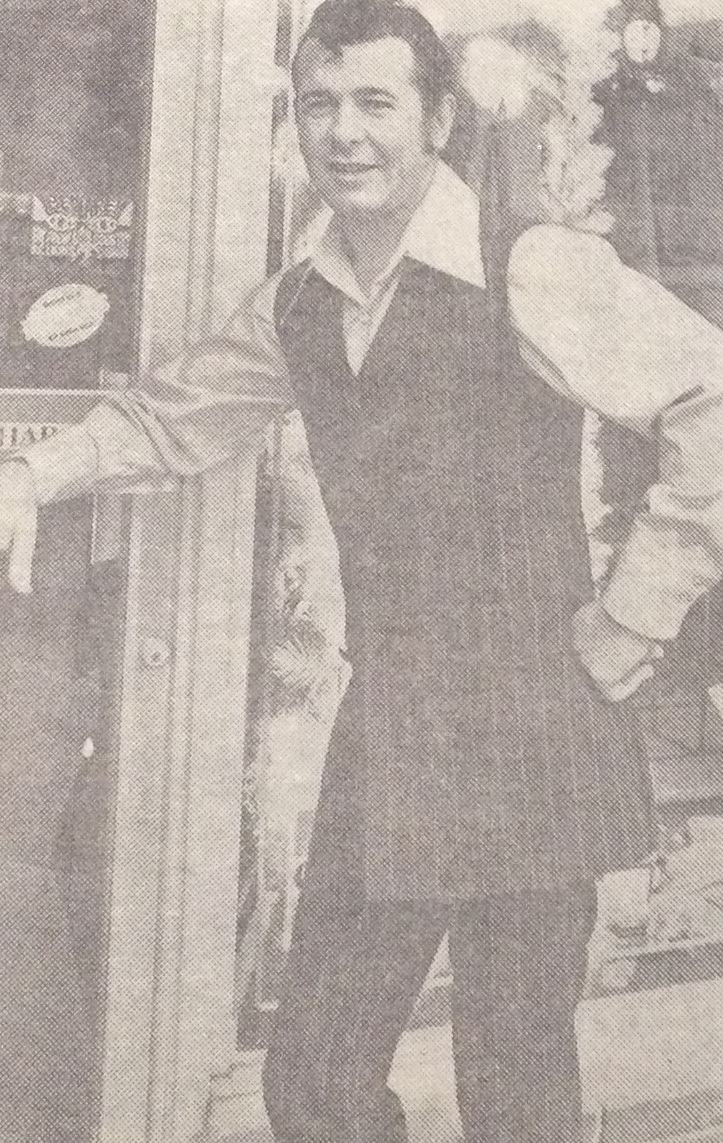
- Born: Paul Minichiello; December 9, 1940; Civitanova del Sannio, Italy
- Died: August 1, 2014 (aged 73)
- Occupation: Master Tailor
- Relatives: Dino Minichiello (son)

Paul Minichiello (December 9, 1940 – August 1, 2014) was a master tailor who was a fixture in the Vancouver fashion scene for nearly five decades. He rose to prominence in the 1960s and 1970s by attracting a reputation for offering bold, bespoke tailored clothing that challenged more traditional and conservative approaches to men's fashion.

His work captured the attention of both local and international celebrities, including musicians Sonny Bono, Carl Weathers, Eric Clapton and Randy Bachman; professional athletes Bobby Hull, Gordie Howe and Wayne Gretzky; and high-profile businessmen Kyle Washington, Jim Pattison and Jack Poole.

In 2011 Paul retired and left control of the family business to his daughter, Julie Minichiello.

== Early life ==
Paul Minichiello was born in 1940 in Civitanova del Sannio, a small town in the Italian Province of Isernia.

At the age of five he began sweeping floors in the workshop of a local tailor, but soon moved into the role of apprentice. Eight years later, at the age of 13, he finished his first suit, which he'd designed for his father, who was emigrating to Vancouver, Canada.

One year later Paul left Italy and followed his father, making a solo trek to Vancouver. Upon arrival he immediately began working at a variety of local tailors in order to help pay the way for his mother, brothers and sisters to join them.

== Career ==
In 1964 Paul opened his own shop, Paul's of North Shore, on Lonsdale Avenue in North Vancouver. Prior to this he'd worked for nine years at Tip Top Tailors, a variety of local tailor shops, and for a brief stint at Louis Roth's fashion manufacturing company in Los Angeles.

By the time he started his own shop Paul had developed his own unique style, and was making a name for himself as a trendsetter with a style that "appealed greatly to the young and hip 20-35 demographic."

When asked about his imaginative designs he once said: "You can’t expect a grown man to make the switch from a [more traditional] suit to one of my more creative models in one big step. The transition would be too dramatic."

During the late 1960s he was often referred to as "the Pierre Cardin of Lonsdale Avenue," a reference to the famous Italian fashion designer. But he disliked this comparison, preferring instead to be known simply as Paul Minichiello—"a guy who doesn’t copy anybody," and "who doesn’t really need to lean on Mr. Cardin or Britain's Hardy Ames for ideas."

== Cultural impact ==
It didn't take long for Paul's unique style to catch the eye of local and international celebrities. Soon after it opened, his modest North Shore shop became a regular stop on the travels of many touring musicians, actors, athletes and high-profile businessmen.

One famous incident in 1971 saw him outfit Sonny and Cher from head to toe for their first ever TV show, The Nitty Gritty Hour. The couple visited his shop while they were on tour and placed an order so large that he couldn't complete it before they had to leave town again, so he flew to Los Angeles the following week and delivered the order personally.

Another incident, in 1978, saw Eric Clapton in town, though Paul was less inclined to bend over backwards. Clapton said he wanted Paul to come to where he was staying and measure him for a white fur parka, to which Paul replied: "If he can’t come down to my store, like everyone else, to hell with him, whoever he is."

Later that same year, Penthouse magazine did a feature on the best dressed men in Vancouver, selecting local radio host and devoted Minichiello client Mike Winlaw, who was photographed modelling one of Paul's custom suits.

His work was particularly popular among players in the National Hockey League. The trend began with players on the local team, the Vancouver Canucks, who in turn served as de facto travelling salesmen whose flashy bespoke suits started catching the eye of other players around the league.

Bobby Hull, Wayne Gretzky, Gordie Howe, Gerry Cheevers, Pat Quinn, Dennis Ververgaert and Jerry Korab are counted among some of his most devoted fans, with Korab and Quinn in particular ordering all of their suits exclusively from Paul throughout the remainder of their careers. For three years in a row during this time period, Korab was picked as the NHLs Best Dressed Player.
