= A Loving Spoonful =

Canadian charitable organization

A Loving Spoonful (previously known as the Vancouver Meals Society) is a Vancouver, British Columbia-based charitable organization that provides free meals to people living with HIV/AIDS (PWHAs) in the Metro Vancouver area.

Volunteers deliver approximately 1200 frozen meals and 1200 snack packs each week at an average meal cost of $3.50. In 1998 A Loving Spoonful was named as "the most efficient meal program service" in the region.

The charity's motto is "No One Living With AIDS Should Live With Hunger."

== Mandate ==
Services are offered to PWHAs who have been referred by their doctor because of severe weight loss or recent hospitalization, or because they are primarily homebound.

The meals, which are prepared under the guidance of a nutritionist who specializes in HIV/AIDS, are frozen in individual portions and delivered to clients weekly.

== History ==
In November 1989 a group of volunteers, recognizing the nutritional needs of people living with AIDS, began providing monthly meals at McLaren House, a group home for PWHAs. The event was named "Easter's Sundays" after Easter Armas-Mikulik, the woman who started the program.

Due to high demand, and to the need to support PWHAs who were homebound, Armas-Mikulik created the Vancouver Meals Society (VMS), which ultimately became A Loving Spoonful.

Following a needs assessment and the creation of a long-term budget in 1990, as well as study of established meal delivery programs in other major cities like Seattle, Los Angeles and San Francisco, A Loving Spoonful began providing weekly delivery of meals in 1991.

== Budget and fundraising ==
The charity's current operating budget is $630,000, which is raised via donations, bequests, fund-raisers, and government grants. A minimum of eighty percent of the money received is used to cover program expenses.

Each year A Loving Spoonful and the Vancouver Friends for Life Society are the focus of an event called Dining Out For Life. Participating restaurants donate a portion of their proceeds on the day of the event, and diners are encouraged to make cash donations to volunteers, and are eligible for donated prizes.
