= Dino Minichiello =

- Born: December 28, 1968 (age 57)
- Occupations: Fashion Designer, Entrepreneur
- Relatives: Paul Minichiello (father)
- Website: https://cattivoragazzo.ca/,

Dino Minichiello born on December 28, 1968, in North Vancouver, British Columbia, is a Canadian fashion designer, entrepreneur and the founder of bespoke luxury fashion labels: ONS (1997) Dino Minichiello Designs Ltd, Minichiello Retail (1999), and Cativvo Ragazzo (2016). Minichiello is also the founder of Triumph Capital (2009) a private equity and investment-banking firm; and the Founder and CEO of Snap Brands (2021) a direct-to-consumer (D2C) Telehealth company. In 2026, Minichiello became Interim CEO of Metavista3D Inc., a Canadian public technology company focused on glasses-free 3D and human performance technology applications.

== Early life ==
Dino Minichiello is the son of fashion designer, Paul Minichiello. In 1954, at the age of 14, Paul Minichiello immigrated to North Vancouver, Canada, from Civitanova del Sannio, a small town in the Italian Province of Isernia, where he worked as an apprentice for an Italian master tailor. After working for a series of clothing shops upon arriving in Canada, Paul eventually opened his own bespoke clothier ‘Paul’s of North Shore’. His unique style caught the eye of local and international celebrities. Soon after it opened, his modest North Shore shop became a regular stop on the travels of many touring musicians, actors, athletes and high-profile businessmen.

As a child, the young Dino was swept up by his father’s outgoing personality, bold ideas and colourful network of clients. Dino grew up at the knees of his father’s all-star clientele, such as Jim Pattison, Jack Poole, Murray Pezim, Wayne Gretzky, Sonny and Cher, Al Wilson, Carl Weathers, Jack Wasserman, Leslie Nielsen, Pat Quinn, Harold Snepts, Dennis Ververgaert and Jerry Korab.

One of his father’s friends was boxing coach and Golden Gloves Alumni, Elio Ius, of the "North West Eagles" boxing club. Taking Dino under his wing, Ius began training Dino from his personal home gym, where Dino studied the art of the fight from the ages of 13 to 17. His training soon matured into an appreciation and passion for Mixed Martial Arts serving as a catalyst to his later interest in venture capital activity on behalf of under-publicized Mixed Martial Arts events.

Experiencing dyslexia from an early age, Dino became adept at working around the conventional education system and, in the process, discovered that he had all of the makings of a successful entrepreneur. While taking business classes at Capilano University, Dino reports having hired and directed a small team of business students to articulate a business concept that he had envisioned for his final project. Dino was awarded an A+ by his business professor. Instead of being censored for cheating, he was awarded extra marks for creative and innovative team building that had increased the odds of his business concept being accepted in the market place.

Recognizing that dyslexia was responsible for his heightened sense of visual and sensory learning, Minichiello began to embrace his previously thought ‘disadvantage’ as a gift. In 2002, he began painting; teaching himself the techniques of the old masters as well as contemporary art forms. His effort resulted in an invitation to exhibit his first painting at the North Vancouver Community Arts Gallery which was featured in the North Shore News.

The family business, and his father’s success, made a large impression on Dino, and soon after he graduated high school he designed and created his own zip-up dress shirt. It was a hit, and all his friends wanted one for themselves, but it wasn't until his mid-twenties that he felt ready to step into his father’s footsteps.

From 1995 – 2005, Minichiello widened the application of his artistic experiment with the launch of "Naturally Creative" landscape design. Using hand drawn designs to improve the backyard aesthetics of his upscale north shore clients, Dino’s popularity soon attracted the attention of local media. The North Shore news published a contest called the “Ugliest Backyard Contest”. The grand prize was a Naturally Creative solution, awarded to the Ugliest Yard winner. A two-page spread, featuring before and after photos of the Ugliest Yard transformation, marked the event finale.

== Professional life ==
=== ONS ===
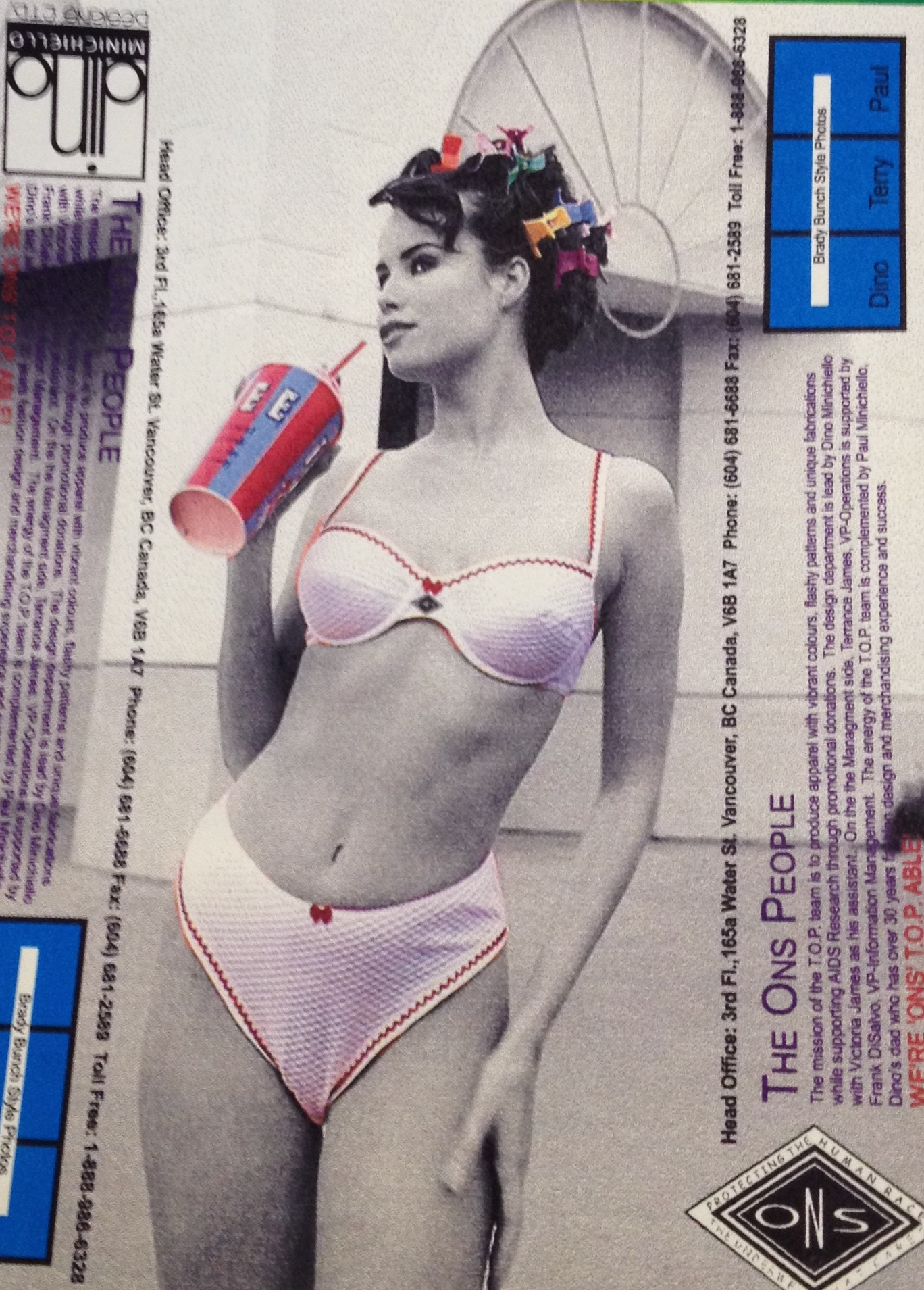
Print advertisement for ONS undergarments, 1997

In 1996 Minichiello launched ONS, a chic but sassy line of bespoke undergarments, boldly branded to “look best on the bedroom floor”. Sometimes playfully referred to by insiders as ‘One Night Stand’, ONS undergarments were brightly colored boxers, briefs and G-strings in fabrics like burnout velvet, stretch velour and imported silk. ONS was one of the first brands of underwear marketed as a lifestyle choice. Each ONS purchase included a complimentary (and flavoured) ONS-labeled condom, with portions of sales going to HIV and AIDS research. The boundary-pushing marketing and designs created a buzz, shooting Minichiello into the Vancouver fashion scene as one of the first designers to anticipate the unlimited possibilities of underwear conceived as play, entertainment, identity, and social activism.

Appearing in Vancouver magazine, Vancouver ECHO, Vancouver Taxi, and the North Shore News, each cover story profiled him as one of the city's most promising young designers responsible for putting Vancouver back on the international fashion map.

=== Minichiello retail ===
Leaving ONS at the height of its popularity, Dino moved into the Yaletown fashion scene in 1999, with first-rate designer, Julie Berg, and a classically trained master Italian tailor under the label, Minichiello. The Minichiello label produced luxury collections of men and women’s apparel, which Dino marketed as “Old World Italian Design with a New World Attitude”.

Dino's new store and fashion line quickly gained him celebrity clients such as Rodney Dangerfield, Nick Gilder, Pat Quinn and Olympian Charmaine Crooks.

During this time he was also nominated for "best emerging designer" by the B.C. apparel industry.

The Minichiello family label is now owned and operated by Dino’s sister, Julie Minichiello.

=== Triumph Capital ===
In 2009, Dino decided to capitalize on the abundance of ideas and opportunities he was encountering within his social and business network. He began raising venture capital for underfunded start-ups to such an extent that he closed Minichiello; taking a detour from fashion to found Triumph Capital, a private equity and investment banking firm, with the idea of bringing under-funded, ahead-of-the-curve projects into new levels of profitability. In 2014, Dino and his team established an ambitious, live-event media and post-production company to feature under-publicized Mixed Martial Arts events. It was christened Takedown Fight Media. Takedown produced a publicity package that was sold and distributed to networks across the globe. Ken Pavia was made director of business development and Takedown quickly acquired the participation of more than 30 international MMA organizations. After suffering a personal financial loss trying to stop shares plummeting on a stock market short, Dino closed Triumph Capital.

=== Cattivo Ragazzo ===
In 2016 Dino launched a menswear label, Cattivo Ragazzo, (meaning “bad boys” with chivalry).

Cattivo Ragazzo, continues to cater to its bespoke clientele, while moving online with a new masculine ready-to-wear collection.

== Personal life ==
Dino married Stacey Henderson in 2000. In 2005 they had a daughter, Capri Minichiello. Dino and Stacey were divorced in 2010.

Dino reports that his daughter, Capri, is his greatest inspiration.

Dino speaks highly of his mother, Joan, as someone who shared many common interests and activities with him during his childhood, especially cooking, hiking and attending garage sales. It is to his mother, that Dino attributes his values of chivalry and respect for women, and is the guiding mantra implied by the Italian translation 'Cattivo Ragazzo'.

== Charity work ==
Throughout the years Dino has played an active role as a fundraiser for a variety of local, national and international charities, including: the Heart and Stroke Foundation, World Vision, the Children's Wish Foundation, the ALS Society of Canada, A Loving Spoonful, and the Richard Brodeur Charity Golf Classic.
