= The Short Game =

- Directed by: Josh Greenbaum
- Produced by: Josh Greenbaum; Christopher Leggett; Rafael Marmor
- Narrated by: Edd Hall
- Production companies: Delirio Films; Tenman Films; Iron Ocean Films
- Distributed by: Samuel Goldwyn Films; Phase 4 Films; Netflix
- Release date: September 20, 2013
- Running time: 99 minutes
- Country: United States
- Language: English
- Box office: $39,819

The Short Game is a 2013 documentary film about 7- and 8-year-old golfers. Produced by Justin Timberlake and Jessica Biel and directed by Josh Greenbaum, it presents eight entrants in the 2012 U.S. Kids Golf World Championship. The film premiered in 10 cities on September 20, 2013.

== Plot ==
Beginning 6 months before the 2012 World Championships, the movie visits each of the eight subjects at their homes, some of which are as far away as Paris, Manila, Johannesburg, and Shenzhen, China to meet the kids and their parents. Once the subjects are introduced we observe the various trials and tribulations of the competition. The subjects of the movie are evenly split between children from the United States and other countries with five boys and three girls, including Allan Kournikova (half-brother of Anna), Sky Sudberry, and Augustin Valery (great-grandson of French poet Paul Valéry). Kournikova went on to win the boy's division of this event for his age group.

The film also includes interviews with golfing legends Jack Nicklaus, Gary Player, Chi-Chi Rodríguez, and Annika Sörenstam.

== Cast ==
Name	Age	Gender	Hometown	Nationality	Result
Amari Avery	8	Female	Riverside, California	United States	1st
Jed Dy	8	Male	Manila, Philippines	Philippines	9th
Allan Kournikova	7	Male	West Palm Beach, Florida	United States	1st
Zamokuhle "Zama" Nxasana	8	Male	Johannesburg, South Africa	South Africa	18th
Alexa Pano	7	Female	Lake Worth Beach, Florida	United States	1st
Sky Sudberry	8	Female	Tiki Island, Texas	United States	8th
Augustin Valery	8	Male	Paris, France	France	40th
Yang Kuang	7	Male	Shenzhen, China	China	14th

- Amari Avery, 8, of Riverside, California, wants to be like Tiger Woods. She was also featured in the 2013 documentary Trophy Kids. She is a strong golfer, but her father is overbearing and she struggles with allowing her emotions to get the best of her when she does poorly. She comes in first in her category.
- Jed Dy, 8, of Manila, Philippines, is autistic and does not enjoy the attention he receives for his golfing. After a mix-up in which he loses points because his family did not understand how long the tournament would be delayed for weather, he comes in ninth in his category. If not for the penalty, he would have come in first, as he had the best score in the entire tournament.
- Allan Kournikova, 7, of West Palm Beach, Florida, is the younger brother of Anna Kournikova and is considered the best male golfer in his age group. He lives in Florida with his mother and is good friends with Alexa. He is very opinionated and occasionally comes off as arrogant, such as when a trainer must reprimand him for showing excitement at his opponent doing poorly. He comes in first in his category.
- Zamokuhle "Zama" Nxasana, 8, of Johannesburg, South Africa, is at Pinehurst for the second time. In 2011 he came in 43rd. He is the most exuberant of the cast—while the other children seem most focused on winning first place, he is pleased to come in 18th in his category and win the most improved award. His father is concerned with teaching him the history of South Africa.
- Alexa Pano, 7, of Lake Worth Beach, Florida, is considered the best female golfer in her age group. She is good friends with Allan. She comes in first in her category.
- Sky Sudberry, 8, of The Woodlands, Texas, explains golf terms to the audience. Like Augustin, she is small and needs to build more muscle. She comes in 8th in her category.
- Augustin Valery, 8, of Paris, France, is the great-grandson of the poet Paul Valéry. He is very intellectual but is concerned with building up his physique. He is slight enough that Zama, who befriends him, thinks that he is a girl. He comes in 40th in his category.
- Yang Kuang, 7, of Shenzhen, China, his family first know about golf through golf instructional DVDS in the store, and he started to learn the game with his father. He comes in 14th in his category.

== Production ==
The majority of the film was shot during the tournament, with 18 different camera crews using Canon EOS C300 cameras with Canon 70–200mm f/2.8 and Canon 25-75 f/2.8 lenses. Each child was followed by two crews, one ahead and one behind.

== Critical commentary ==
Based on 18 reviews on Rotten Tomatoes, it had an average 6.2 rating out of 10 and an 83% approval rating. At Metacritic, it has a score of 51 out of 100 based on 10 reviews. The film won the Audience Award at the SXSW Film Festival in March 2013.

Los Angeles Times critic Annlee Ellingson describes the movie as a "warts-and-all" depiction of youth golfers that is similar to the 2002 documentary film Spellbound about the 1999 Scripps National Spelling Bee. Nicolas Rapold of The New York Times also notes that the movie was probably modeled after Spellbound and raved about the movie's uninhibited cuteness. Rapold compared the introductions to reality shows but notes that some of the subjects such as Kournikova and his mother are more fleshed out than others. Golf Digest critic John Strege said that "The toxic mix of youth sports and overzealous parents threatened to hijack" the film but the subjects themselves were so entertaining that the movie was not a loss. Boston Globe critic Michael Whitmer says the results of Greenbaum's feature film debut were compelling although tinged with discomfort. USA Today critic Scott Bowles described the film as upbeat and noted that "...for astute viewers and golf fans, Short hits the green consistently and is, at times, a hole-in-one."
