= Alexa Pano =

American professional golfer (born 2004)

Personal information
- Nationality: United States
- Born: August 20, 2004 (age 22) Westborough, Massachusetts, U.S.
- Height: 5 ft 11 in (180 cm)

Career
- Sport: Golf
- Turned professional: 2022
- Current tour: LPGA Tour (since 2023)
- Former tour: Epson Tour
- Professional wins: 1

Number of wins by tour
- LPGA Tour: 1
- Ladies European Tour: 1

Best results in LPGA major championships
- Chevron Championship: T60: 2024
- Women's PGA C'ship: 18th: 2026
- U.S. Women's Open: T58: 2024
- Women's British Open: T10: 2024
- Evian Championship: CUT: 2024, 2025, 2026

Alexa Pano (born August 20, 2004) is an American professional golfer. She was featured in the 2013 documentary film The Short Game.

== Early life ==
Pano was born in Westborough, Massachusetts, and her parents divorced when she was a baby. She has since lived with her father, Rick, in Lake Worth Beach, Florida. She began playing golf at the age of 5.

At the 2012 U.S. Kids Golf World Championship, then-7-year-old Pano and a group of her fellow competitors, including Allan Kournikova and Sky Sudberry, were filmed for The Short Game. At that point, she was only spending mornings at Citrus Cove Elementary School and taking the remainder of her classes through Florida Virtual School so that she could focus on golf. In the film, she said that she wanted to be the first woman to play in a tournament at Augusta, a feat that she accomplished seven years later when she competed in the inaugural Augusta National Women's Amateur.

== Amateur career ==
Pano was the first three-time national finalist in the Drive, Chip and Putt competition. She is tied for most U.S. Kids Golf World Championships with five in 2011, 2012, 2013, 2015, and 2016.

Pano was the youngest golfer to play a LPGA of Japan Tour event when she played the 2016 Yonex Ladies Open at the age of 11. At 13, Pano played in her first LPGA Tour event, the 2018 Thornberry Creek LPGA Classic. The same year, she represented the United States for a win in the Junior Ryder Cup.

In 2019, she became the youngest player in the inaugural Augusta National Women's Amateur. She also qualified for the U.S. Women's Open, the youngest golfer that year. She played for the winning team in the 2019 Junior Solheim Cup.

== Professional career ==
Pano turned professional in April 2022. She earned status on the Epson Tour by finishing T-10th at Stage II of the 2021 LPGA Qualifying Tournament. She earned her LPGA Tour card for 2023 via Q-School.

On August 20, 2023, she won her first professional title, on her 19th birthday, at the ISPS Handa World Invitational at Galgorm Castle Golf Club (76-70-69-66=281, 8-under-par), in a three-hole playoff over Gabriella Cowley and Esther Henseleit.

== Amateur wins ==
- 2016 PDQ - Philadelphia Runner Junior
- 2017 Ione D Jones-Doherty Amateur
- 2018 Dustin Johnson World Junior Championship, Dixie Amateur
- 2019 Dustin Johnson World Junior Championship, Scott Robertson Memorial, Rolex Girls Junior Championship, Ione D Jones-Doherty Amateur
- 2020 Ione D Jones-Doherty Amateur

== Professional wins (1) ==
=== LPGA Tour wins (1) ===
Legend
Major championships (0)
Other LPGA Tour (1)

| No. | Date | Tournament | Winning score | To par | Margin of victory | Runner-up | Winner's share ($) |
|---|---|---|---|---|---|---|---|
| 1 | Aug 20, 2023 | ISPS Handa World Invitational^{[1]} | 76-70-69-66=281 | −8 | Playoff | (England) Gabriella Cowley (Germany) Esther Henseleit | 225,000 |

^{1} Co-sanctioned by the Ladies European Tour.

LPGA Tour playoff record (1–0)

| No. | Year | Tournament | Opponents | Result |
|---|---|---|---|---|
| 1 | 2023 | ISPS Handa World Invitational | (England) Gabriella Cowley (Germany) Esther Henseleit | Won with birdie on third extra hole Henseleit eliminated by birdie on first hole |

== Results in LPGA majors ==
Results not in chronological order.

| Tournament | 2019 | 2020 | 2021 | 2022 | 2023 | 2024 | 2025 | 2026 |
|---|---|---|---|---|---|---|---|---|
| Chevron Championship | | | | | | T60 | T67 | CUT |
| U.S. Women's Open | CUT | | | CUT | | T58 | | |
| Women's PGA Championship | | | | | T61 | CUT | CUT | 18 |
| The Evian Championship | | NT | | | | CUT | CUT | CUT |
| Women's British Open | | | | | | T10 | T33 | |

Top 10
Did not play

CUT = missed the half-way cut
NT = no tournament
T = tied

== LPGA Tour career summary ==
| Year | Tournaments played | Cuts made* | Wins | 2nd | 3rd | Top 10s | Best finish | Earnings ($) | Money list rank | Scoring average | Scoring rank |
|---|---|---|---|---|---|---|---|---|---|---|---|
| 2018 | 1 | 0 | 0 | 0 | 0 | 0 | MC | 0 | n/a | 73.50 | n/a |
| 2019 | 2 | 0 | 0 | 0 | 0 | 0 | MC | 0 | n/a | 72.75 | n/a |
| 2020 | 2 | 1 | 0 | 0 | 0 | 0 | T41 | 0 | n/a | 73.20 | n/a |
| 2021 | 2 | 0 | 0 | 0 | 0 | 0 | MC | 0 | n/a | 77.25 | n/a |
| 2022 | 1 | 0 | 0 | 0 | 0 | 0 | MC | 0 | n/a | 75.00 | n/a |
| 2023 | 21 | 12 | 1 | 0 | 0 | 1 | 1 | 442,855 | 66 | 71.23 | 57 |
| 2024 | 28 | 18 | 0 | 1 | 0 | 2 | 2 | 557,421 | 68 | 71.89 | 86 |
| 2025 | 24 | 14 | 0 | 0 | 0 | 0 | T15 | 267,244 | 92 | 72.79 | 132 |
| Totals^ | 73 (2023) | 64 (2023) | 1 | 1 | 0 | 3 | 1 | 1,267,520 | 293 | | |

^ Official as of 2025 season
*Includes matchplay and other tournaments without a cut.

== World ranking ==
Position in Women's World Golf Rankings at the end of each calendar year.

| Year | World ranking | Source |
|---|---|---|
| 2019 | 1,016 | |
| 2020 | 768 | |
| 2021 | 934 | |
| 2022 | 455 | |
| 2023 | 125 | |
| 2024 | 110 | |
| 2025 | 204 | |

== U.S. national team appearances ==
- Junior Ryder Cup: 2018 (winners), 2021 (qualified, Cup not played due to COVID-19)
- Junior Solheim Cup: 2019 (winners), 2021
