= Allan Kournikova =

Russian-American golfer (born 2004)

Allan Kournikova (Note: Russian surnames are inflected based on the gender of the bearer. Kournikova uses the female form of his surname; the linguistically correct form would be Kournikov.)
Personal information
- Born: September 22, 2004 (age 22) Russia

Career
- Sport: Golf
- Status: Amateur

Allan Kournikova (Russian: А́ллан Ку́рников, romanized: Allan Kournikov; born September 22, 2004) is a youth golfer. He won the U.S. Kids Golf European Championships in 2011–2015, and the U.S. Kids Golf World Championships from 2011 to 2013 and in 2015. He was also featured in the 2013 documentary film The Short Game. He is the half-brother of former professional tennis player Anna Kournikova.

== Background ==
Allan Kournikova was born in Russia on September 22, 2004, to Alla Kournikova and composer/instrumentalist Baron Michael Moog de Medici.

At age two, he took lessons in horseback riding and competed in international show jumping events.

Golf professionals began to take notice of Kournikova at age 4, marveling at his skill.

When he was eight, Kournikova took classes at Palm Beach Virtual School to allow time for golf training.

Kournikova won the U.S. Kids Golf European Championships in 2011–2015 and the U.S. Kids Golf World Championships from 2011 to 2013 and in 2015.

By 2012, his repeat world championships in golf were mentioned in The Wall Street Journal.

His defense of his title at the 2012 U.S. Kids Golf World Championship was chronicled in the 2013 documentary film The Short Game.

In June and August 2013, Kournikova won three consecutive titles in the European and world championships in the division for 8-year-olds. In May 2014, Kournikova won the European championship by 22 strokes. He won the 10-year-old divisions of the 2015 European World Championship and 2015 U.S. Kids World Championship by four strokes and nine strokes, respectively.

== Controversy ==
In January 2010, Kournikova's mother, Alla Kournikova, was convicted of third-degree felony child neglect for leaving him at home without supervision while she ran errands. The 5-year-old jumped from a second-floor window and was found wet, crying, bruised and bleeding by a neighbor, who called police. Kournikova was treated at a local hospital.

== Amateur wins ==
- 2019 AJGA Pinehurst Junior
