= Trophy Kids =

Trophy Kids may refer to:

- Trophy Kids (2011 film), a film about children with unrealistic expectations
- Trophy Kids (2013 film), a documentary about overbearing parents in sports
- A term sometimes used for Millennials
