= Amari Avery =

American professional golfer (born 2004)

Personal information
- Nationality: United States
- Born: December 30, 2004 (age 21) Orange County, California

Career
- Sport: Golf
- College: University of Southern California
- Turned professional: 2024
- Current tour: Epson Tour
- Professional wins: 1

Number of wins by tour
- Epson Tour: 1

Best results in LPGA major championships
- Chevron Championship: T45: 2023
- Women's PGA C'ship: CUT: 2026
- U.S. Women's Open: T45: 2025
- Women's British Open: DNP
- Evian Championship: DNP

Amari Nicole Avery (born December 30, 2004) is an American professional golfer who played for the USC Trojans women's golf team. She was featured in the 2013 films The Short Game and Trophy Kids.

== Early life and education ==
Her father is African-American and her mother Filipino. She began taking golf lessons in Anaheim, California before she entered kindergarten. Avery was one of eight entrants into the 2012 U. S. Kids Golf tournament featured in the film The Short Game. She was eight years old at the time. She was also featured in the 2013 film Trophy Kids.

In August 2020, Avery committed to play golf at the University of Southern California.

== Amateur career ==
By the age of six, Avery had won dozens of youth golf tournaments which included the Junior World Golf Championships.

In 2021, she played in the Augusta National Women's Amateur, finishing 29th in the field.

In 2023, she played in the Chevron Championship, her third start as an amateur on the LPGA Tour and the first time making the cut at a tour event. The same year, she played in the U.S. Women's Open, after winning the 36-hole qualifier in Rancho Santa Fe, California, among 64 competitors. She made the cut at the U.S. Women's Open and finished tied for 48th place.

== Professional career ==
Avery turned professional in 2024 following the NCAA Championship. She made her professional debut at the FireKeepers Casino Hotel Championship on the Epson Tour. She earned her first professional win at the 2026 IOA Championship on the Epson Tour. She was the third African-American to win on the tour after LaRee Sugg in 1998 and Sadena Parks in 2014.

== Amateur wins ==
- 2017 Corey Pavin Invitational, ClubCorp Mission Hills Desert Junior, Callaway Golf Junior Championship
- 2019 California Women's Amateur Championship
- 2022 ICON Invitational, The Gold Rush, NCAA Stanford Regional, Windy City Collegiate Classic
- 2023 Leadership And Golf Invitational

== Professional wins (1) ==
=== Epson Tour wins (1) ===
- 2026 IOA Championship

== Results in LPGA majors ==
Tournament	2023	2024	2025	2026
Chevron Championship	T45			
U.S. Women's Open	T48		T45	
Women's PGA Championship				CUT
The Evian Championship				
Women's British Open				

Did not play

CUT = missed the half-way cut
"T" = tied

== U.S. national team appearances ==
- Junior Solheim Cup: 2021
- Curtis Cup: 2022 (winners)
- Arnold Palmer Cup: 2022, 2023
