= Helen Lengfeld =

American golfer

Helen Lengfeld was an American golfer and founder of the California Women's Amateur Championship.

Lengfeld learned to play golf starting at the age of eight, playing at the Raymond Hotel while vacationing with her parents. In 1926, Lengfeld help found the Women’s Golf Association of Northern California, winning its first tournament the following year.

During World War II, Lengfeld organized 400 voluntary services groups for women across the United States. She organized several amateur golf tournaments in her life, including the California Women's Amateur Championship, presenting the idea to S.F.B. Morse. She also founded the junior version of the tournament. She was also named one of the five most influential women in golf by Golf Digest.

Lengfeld died in 1986 at the age of 88.
