= Anna Kournikova =

Russian tennis player and model (born 1981)

- Анна Курникова
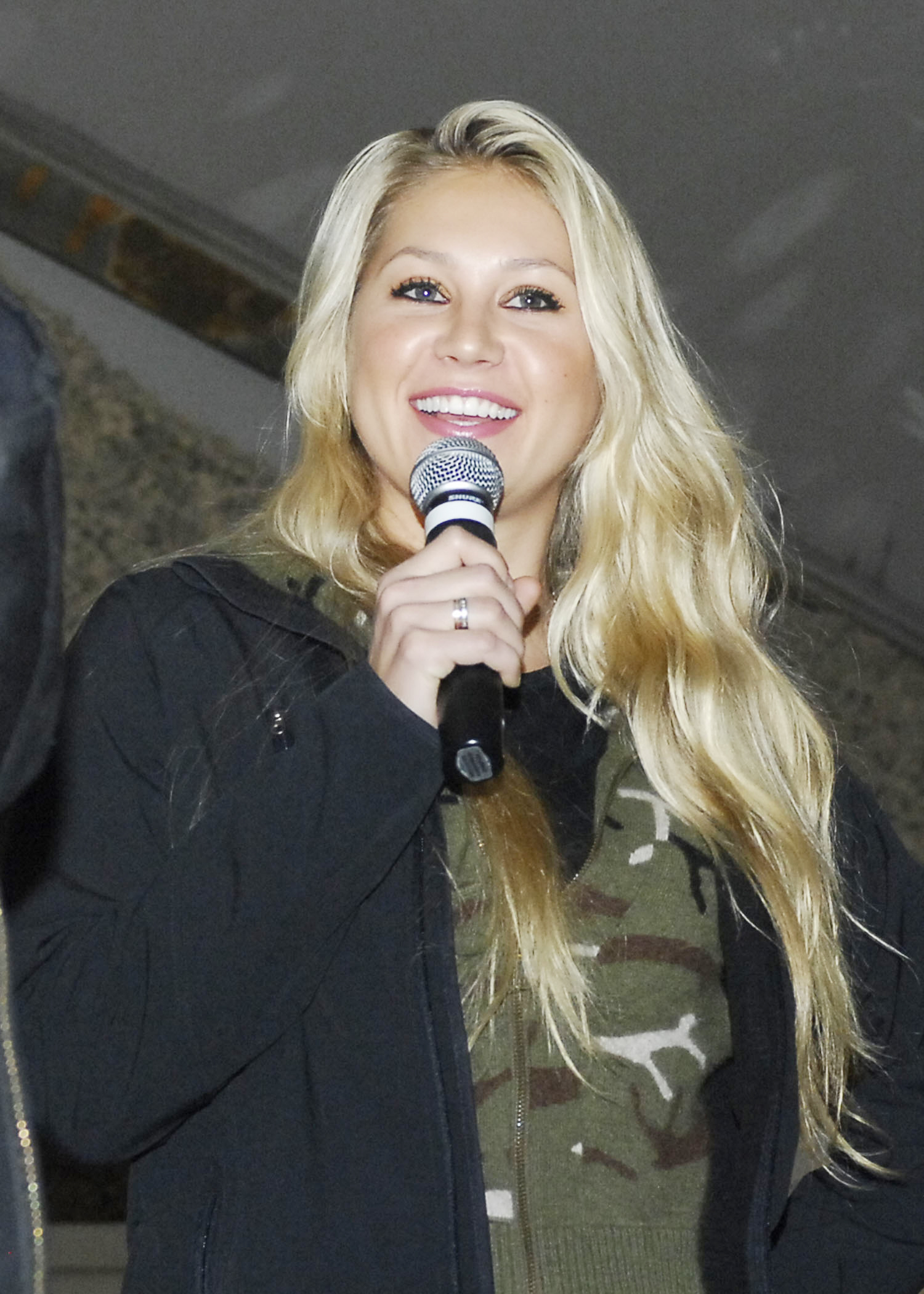
- Kournikova at Bagram Air Base during a 2009 USO tour
- Born: 7 June 1981 (age 45); Moscow, Russian SFSR, Soviet Union
- Height: 1.73 m (5 ft 8 in)
- Partner: Enrique Iglesias (2001–present)
- Tennis career
- Country (sports): Russia
- Turned pro: October 1995
- Retired: May 2003
- Plays: Right-handed (two-handed backhand)
- Prize money: US$3,584,662

Singles
- Career record: 209–129
- Career titles: 0
- Highest ranking: No. 8 (20 November 2000)

Grand Slam singles results
- Australian Open: QF (2001)
- French Open: 4R (1998, 1999)
- Wimbledon: SF (1997)
- US Open: 4R (1996, 1998)

Other tournaments
- Tour Finals: SF (2000)
- Olympic Games: 1R (1996)

Doubles
- Career record: 200–71
- Career titles: 16
- Highest ranking: No. 1 (22 November 1999)

Grand Slam doubles results
- Australian Open: W (1999, 2002)
- French Open: F (1999)
- Wimbledon: SF (2000, 2002)
- US Open: QF (1996, 2002)

Other doubles tournaments
- Tour Finals: W (1999, 2000)

Mixed doubles
- Career record: 24–14

Grand Slam mixed doubles results
- Australian Open: SF (1997, 2000)
- French Open: QF (1997)
- Wimbledon: F (1999)
- US Open: F (2000)

Anna Sergeyevna Kournikova Iglesias (née Kournikova; Russian: Анна Сергеевна Курникова; Russian: [ˈanːə sʲɪrˈɡʲejɪvnə ˈkurnʲɪkəvə]; born 7 June 1981) is a Russian model and television personality, and former professional tennis player. Her appearance and celebrity status made her one of the best known tennis stars worldwide. At the peak of her fame, fans looking for images of Kournikova made her name one of the most common search strings on Google Search.

Despite never winning a singles title, she reached No. 8 in the world in 2000. She achieved greater success playing doubles, where she was at times the world No. 1 player. With Martina Hingis as her partner, she won Grand Slam titles in Australia in 1999 and 2002, and the WTA Championships in 1999 and 2000. They referred to themselves as the "Spice Girls of Tennis".

Kournikova retired from professional tennis in 2003 due to serious back and spinal problems, including a herniated disk. She lives in Miami Beach, Florida, and played in occasional exhibitions and in doubles for the St. Louis Aces of World TeamTennis before the team folded in 2011. She was a new trainer for season 12 of the television show The Biggest Loser, replacing Jillian Michaels, but did not return for season 13. In addition to her tennis and television work, Kournikova serves as a Global Ambassador for Population Services International's "Five & Alive" program, which addresses health crises facing children under the age of five and their families.

== Early life ==
Kournikova was born in Moscow, Russia, on 7 June 1981. Her father, Sergei Kournikov (born 1961), a former Greco-Roman wrestling champion, eventually earned a PhD and was a professor at the University of Physical Culture and Sport in Moscow. As of 2001, he was still a part-time martial arts instructor there. Her mother Alla (born 1963) had been a 400-metre runner. Her younger half-brother, Allan, is a youth golf world champion who was featured in the 2013 documentary film The Short Game.

Sergei Kournikov has said, "We were young and we liked the clean, physical life, so Anna was in a good environment for sport from the beginning".

Kournikova received her first tennis racquet as a New Year gift in 1986 at the age of five. Describing her early regimen, she said, "I played two times a week from age six. It was a children's program. And it was just for fun; my parents didn't know I was going to play professionally, they just wanted me to do something because I had lots of energy. It was only when I started playing well at seven that I went to a professional academy. I would go to school, and then my parents would take me to the club, and I'd spend the rest of the day there just having fun with the kids." In 1986, Kournikova became a member of the Spartak Tennis Club, coached by Larissa Preobrazhenskaya. In 1989, at the age of eight, Kournikova began appearing in junior tournaments, and by the following year, was attracting attention from tennis scouts across the world. She signed a management deal at age ten and went to Bradenton, Florida, to train at Nick Bollettieri's celebrated tennis academy.

== Tennis career ==
=== 1989–1997: Early years and breakthrough ===
Following her arrival in the United States, she became prominent on the tennis scene. At the age of 14, she won the European Championships and the Italian Open Junior tournament. In December 1995, she became the youngest player to win the 18-and-under division of the Junior Orange Bowl tennis tournament. By the end of the year, Kournikova was crowned the ITF Junior World Champion U-18 and Junior European Champion U-18.

Earlier, in September 1995, Kournikova, still only 14 years of age, debuted in the WTA Tour, when she received a wildcard into the qualifications at the WTA tournament in Moscow, the Moscow Ladies Open, and qualified before losing in the second round of the main draw to third-seeded Sabine Appelmans. She also reached her first WTA Tour doubles final in that debut appearance – partnering with 1995 Wimbledon girls' champion in both singles and doubles Aleksandra Olsza, she lost the title match to Meredith McGrath and Larisa Savchenko-Neiland.

In February–March 1996, Kournikova won two ITF titles, in Midland, Michigan and Rockford, Illinois. Still only 14 years of age, in April 1996 she debuted at the Fed Cup for Russia, the youngest player ever to participate and win a match.

In 1996, she started playing under a new coach, Ed Nagel. Her six-year association with Nagel was successful. At 15, she made her Grand Slam debut, reaching the fourth round of the 1996 US Open, losing to Steffi Graf, the eventual champion. After this tournament, Kournikova's ranking jumped from No. 144 to debut in the Top 100 at No. 69. Kournikova was a member of the Russian delegation to the 1996 Olympic Games in Atlanta, Georgia. In 1996, she was named WTA Newcomer of the Year, and she was ranked No. 57 in the end of the season.

Kournikova entered the 1997 Australian Open as world No. 67, where she lost in the first round to world No. 12, Amanda Coetzer. At the Italian Open, Kournikova lost to Amanda Coetzer in the second round. She reached the semi-finals in the doubles partnering with Elena Likhovtseva, before losing to the sixth seeds Mary Joe Fernández and Patricia Tarabini.

At the French Open, Kournikova made it to the third round before losing to world No. 1, Martina Hingis. She also reached the third round in doubles with Likhovtseva. At the Wimbledon Championships, Kournikova became only the second woman in the open era to reach the semi-finals in her Wimbledon debut, the first being Chris Evert in 1972. There she lost to eventual champion Martina Hingis.

At the US Open, she lost in the second round to the eleventh seed Irina Spîrlea. Partnering with Likhovtseva, she reached the third round of the women's doubles event. Kournikova played her last WTA Tour event of 1997 at Porsche Tennis Grand Prix in Filderstadt, losing to Amanda Coetzer in the second round of singles, and in the first round of doubles to Lindsay Davenport and Jana Novotná partnering with Likhovtseva. She broke into the top 50 on 19 May, and was ranked No. 32 in singles and No. 41 in doubles at the end of the season.

=== 1998–2000: Success and stardom ===
In 1998, Kournikova broke into the WTA's top 20 rankings for the first time, when she was ranked No. 16. At the Australian Open, Kournikova lost in the third round to world No. 1 player, Martina Hingis. She also partnered with Larisa Savchenko-Neiland in women's doubles, and they lost to eventual champions Hingis and Mirjana Lučić in the second round. Although she lost in the second round of the Paris Open to Anke Huber in singles, Kournikova reached her second doubles WTA Tour final, partnering with Larisa Savchenko-Neiland. They lost to Sabine Appelmans and Miriam Oremans. Kournikova and Savchenko-Neiland reached their second consecutive final at the Linz Open, losing to Alexandra Fusai and Nathalie Tauziat. At the Miami Open, Kournikova reached her first WTA Tour singles final, before losing to Venus Williams in the final.

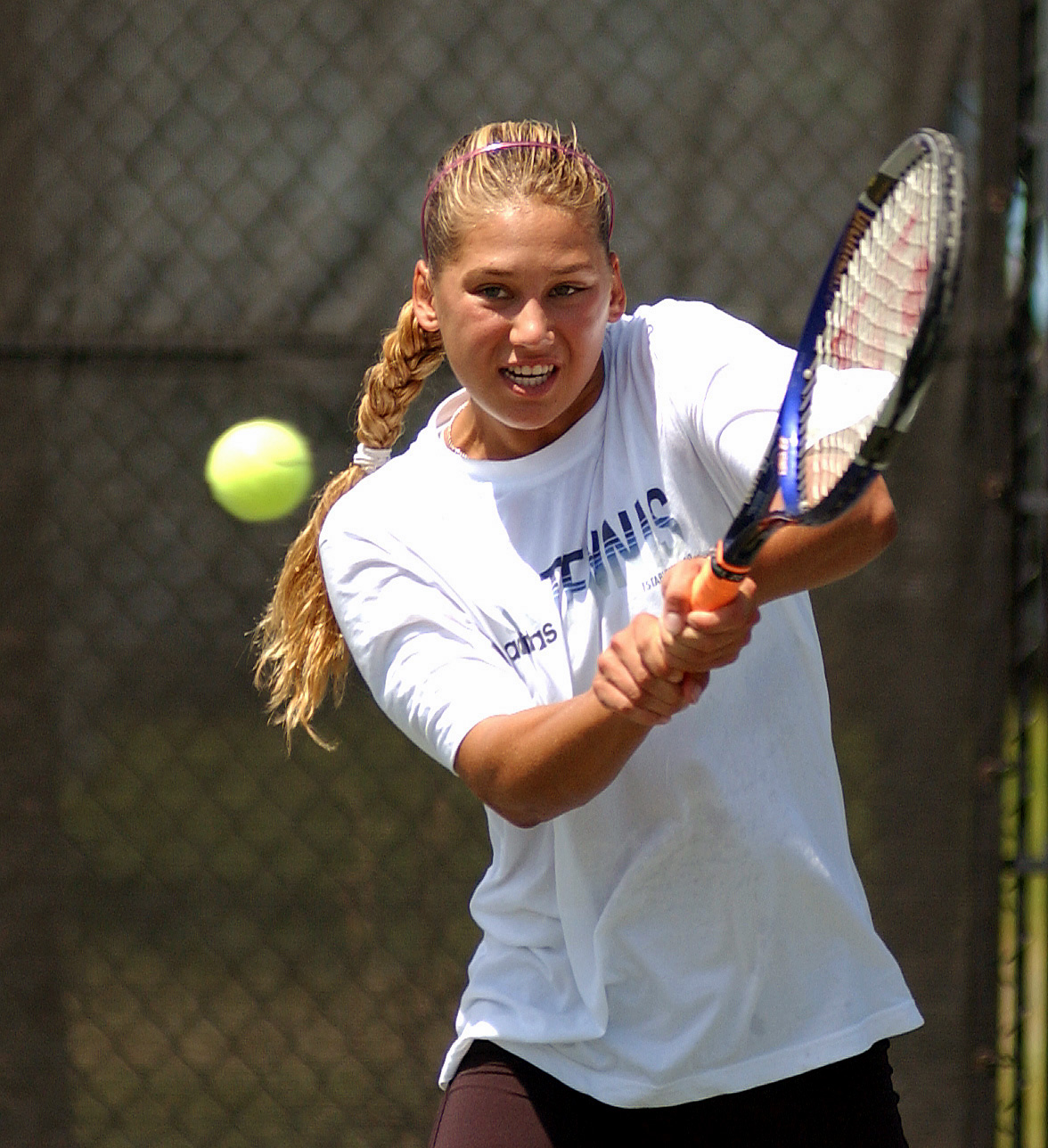
Kournikova practices her backhand for a match at the Family Circle Cup in Charleston, South Carolina, in 2002

Kournikova then reached two consecutive quarterfinals, at Amelia Island and the Italian Open, losing respectively to Lindsay Davenport and Martina Hingis. At the German Open, she reached the semi-finals in both singles and doubles, partnering with Larisa Savchenko-Neiland. At the French Open Kournikova had her best result at this tournament, making it to the fourth round before losing to Jana Novotná. She also reached her first Grand Slam doubles semi-finals, losing with Savchenko-Neiland to Lindsay Davenport and Natasha Zvereva. During her quarterfinals match at the grass-court Eastbourne Open versus Steffi Graf, Kournikova injured her thumb, which would eventually force her to withdraw from the 1998 Wimbledon Championships. However, she won that match, but then withdrew from her semi-finals match against Arantxa Sánchez Vicario. Kournikova returned for the Du Maurier Open and made it to the third round, before losing to Conchita Martínez. At the US Open Kournikova reached the fourth round before losing to Arantxa Sánchez Vicario. Her strong year qualified her for the year-end 1998 WTA Tour Championships, but she lost to Monica Seles in the first round. However, with Seles, she won her first WTA doubles title, in Tokyo, beating Mary Joe Fernández and Arantxa Sánchez Vicario in the final. At the end of the season, she was ranked No. 10 in doubles.

At the start of the 1999 season, Kournikova advanced to the fourth round in singles at the Australian Open before losing to Mary Pierce. In the doubles Kournikova won her first Grand Slam title, partnering with Martina Hingis to defeat Lindsay Davenport and Natasha Zvereva in the final. At the Tier I Family Circle Cup, Kournikova reached her second WTA Tour final, but lost to Martina Hingis. She then defeated Jennifer Capriati, Lindsay Davenport and Patty Schnyder on her route to the Bausch & Lomb Championships semi-finals, losing to Ruxandra Dragomir. At The French Open, Kournikova reached the fourth round before losing to eventual champion Steffi Graf. Once the grass-court season commenced in England, Kournikova lost to Nathalie Tauziat in the semi-finals in Eastbourne. At Wimbledon, Kournikova lost to Venus Williams in the fourth round. She also reached the final in mixed doubles, partnering with Jonas Björkman, but they lost to Leander Paes and Lisa Raymond. Kournikova again qualified for year-end WTA Tour Championships, but lost to Mary Pierce in the first round, and ended the season as World No. 12.

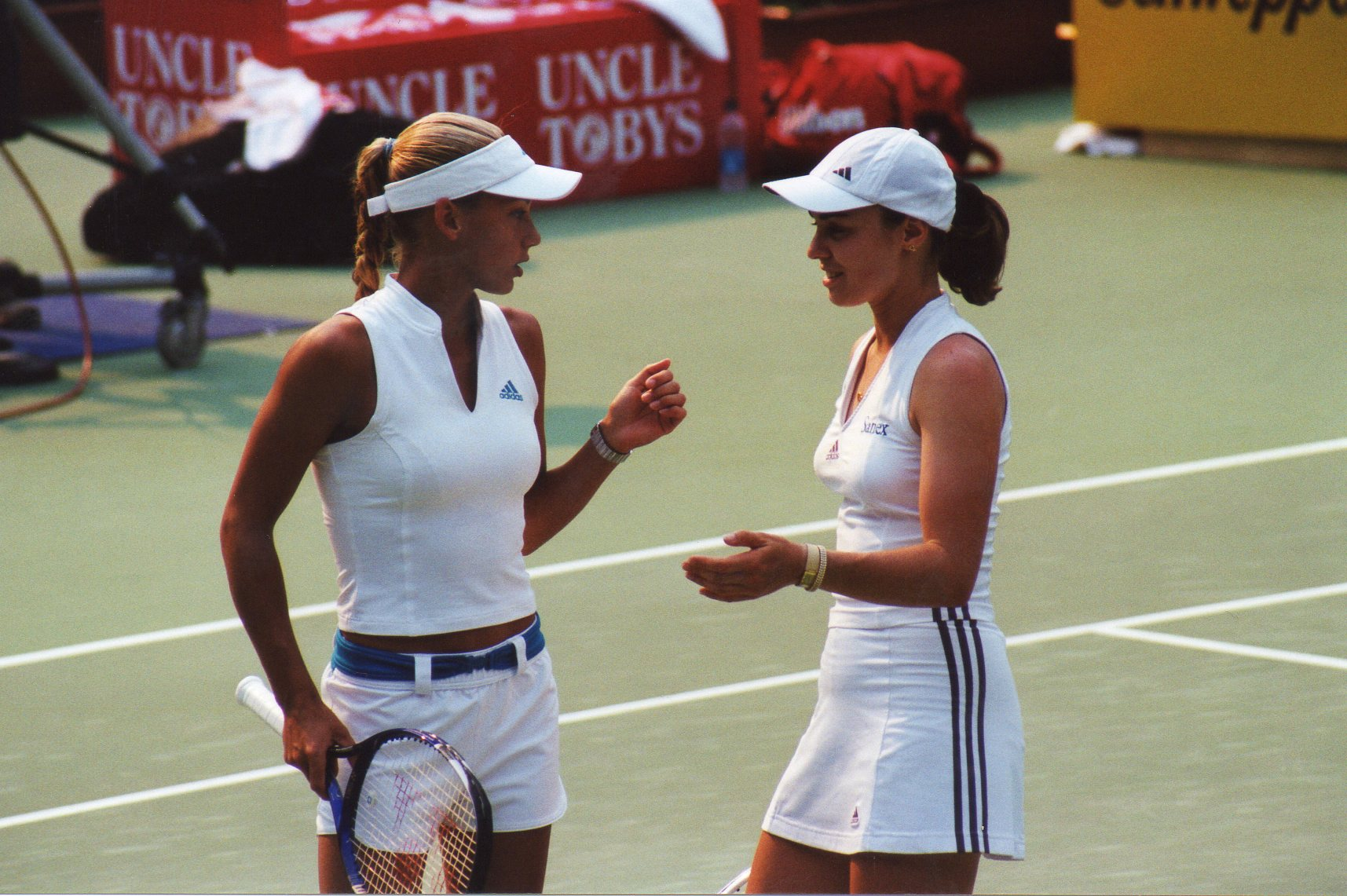
Kournikova (left) with doubles partner Martina Hingis

While Kournikova had a successful singles season, she was even more successful in doubles. After their victory at the Australian Open, she and Martina Hingis won tournaments in Indian Wells, Rome, Eastbourne and the WTA Tour Championships, and reached the final of The French Open where they lost to Serena and Venus Williams. Partnering with Elena Likhovtseva, Kournikova also reached the final in Stanford. On 22 November 1999 she reached the world No. 1 ranking in doubles, and ended the season at this ranking. Kournikova and Hingis were presented with the WTA Award for Doubles Team of the Year.

Kournikova opened her 2000 season winning the Gold Coast Open doubles tournament partnering with Julie Halard. She then reached the singles semi-finals at the Medibank International Sydney, losing to Lindsay Davenport. At the Australian Open, she reached the fourth round in singles and the semi-finals in doubles. That season, Kournikova reached eight semi-finals (Sydney, Scottsdale, Stanford, San Diego, Luxembourg, Leipzig and Tour Championships), seven quarterfinals (Gold Coast, Tokyo, Amelia Island, Hamburg, Eastbourne, Zürich and Philadelphia) and one final. On 20 November 2000 she broke into top 10 for the first time, reaching No. 8. She was also ranked No. 4 in doubles at the end of the season. Kournikova was once again, more successful in doubles. She reached the final of the US Open in mixed doubles, partnering with Max Mirnyi, but they lost to Jared Palmer and Arantxa Sánchez Vicario. She also won six doubles titles – Gold Coast (with Julie Halard), Hamburg (with Natasha Zvereva), Filderstadt, Zürich, Philadelphia and the Tour Championships (with Martina Hingis).

=== 2001–2003: Injuries and final years ===
Her 2001 season was plagued by injuries, including a left foot stress fracture which made her withdraw from 12 tournaments, including the French Open and Wimbledon. She underwent surgery in April. She reached her second career grand slam quarterfinals, at the Australian Open. Kournikova then withdrew from several events due to continuing problems with her left foot and did not return until Leipzig. With Barbara Schett, she won the doubles title in Sydney. She then lost in the finals in Tokyo, partnering with Iroda Tulyaganova, and at San Diego, partnering with Martina Hingis. Hingis and Kournikova also won the Kremlin Cup. At the end of the 2001 season, she was ranked No. 74 in singles and No. 26 in doubles.

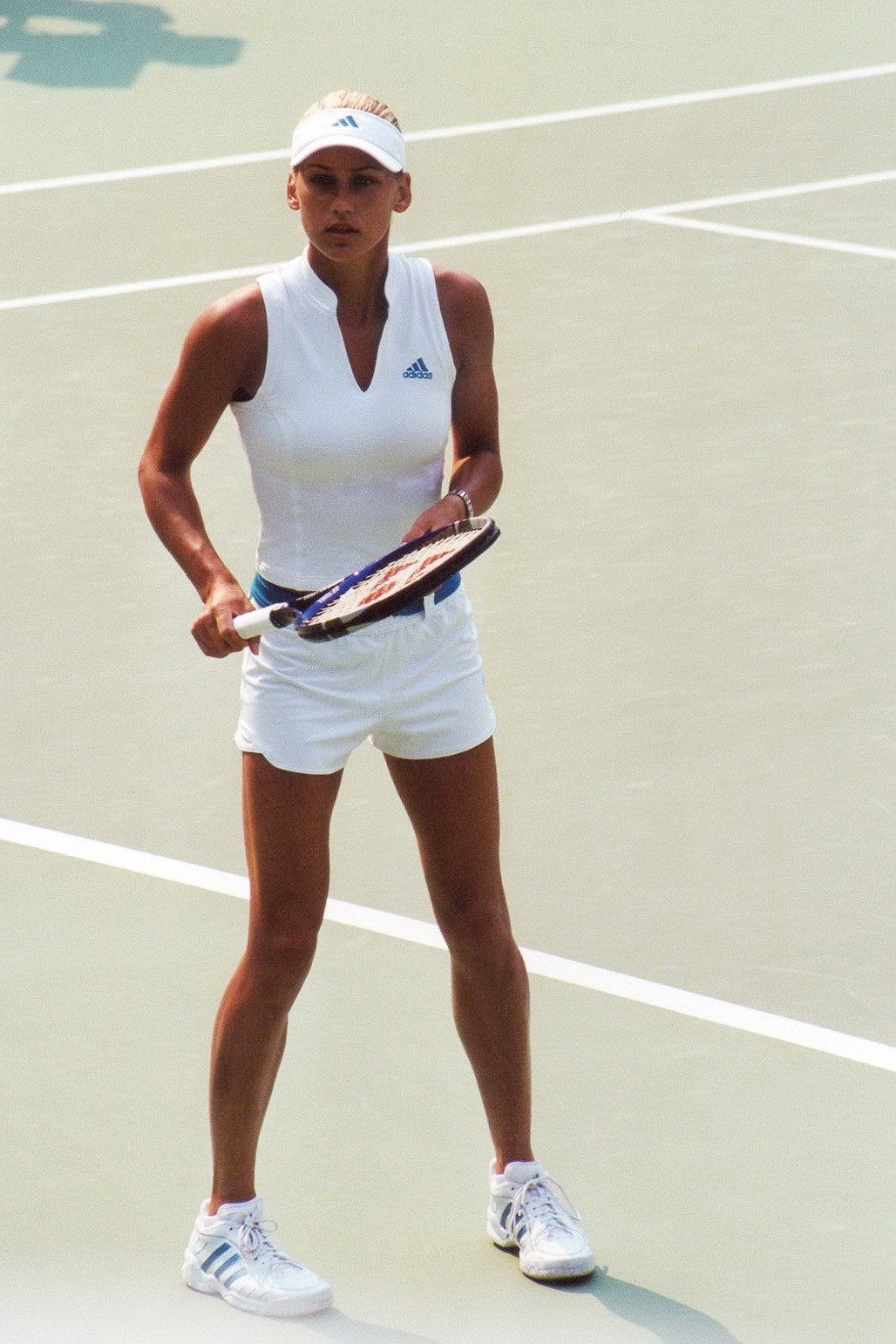
At the 2002 Medibank International Sydney

Kournikova regained some success in 2002. She reached the semi-finals of Auckland, Tokyo, Acapulco and San Diego, and the final of the China Open, losing to Anna Smashnova. This was Kournikova's last singles final. With Martina Hingis, she lost in the final at Sydney, but they won their second Grand Slam title together, the Australian Open. They also lost in the quarterfinals of the US Open. With Chanda Rubin, Kournikova played the semi-finals of Wimbledon, but they lost to Serena and Venus Williams. Partnering with Janet Lee, she won the Shanghai title. At the end of 2002 season, she was ranked No. 35 in singles and No. 11 in doubles.

In 2003, Anna Kournikova achieved her first Grand Slam match victory in two years at the Australian Open. She defeated Henrieta Nagyová in the first round, and then lost to Justine Henin-Hardenne in the 2nd round. She withdrew from Tokyo due to a sprained back suffered at the Australian Open and did not return to Tour until Miami. On 9 April, in what would be the final WTA match of her career, Kournikova dropped out in the first round of the Family Circle Cup in Charleston, due to a left adductor strain. Her singles world ranking was 67. She reached the semi-finals at the ITF tournament in Sea Island, before withdrawing from a match versus Maria Sharapova due to the adductor injury. She lost in the first round of the ITF tournament in Charlottesville. She did not compete for the rest of the season due to a continuing back injury. At the end of the 2003 season and her professional career, she was ranked No. 305 in singles and No. 176 in doubles.

Kournikova's two Grand Slam doubles titles came in 1999 and 2002, both at the Australian Open in the Women's Doubles event with partner Martina Hingis. Kournikova proved a successful doubles player on the professional circuit, winning 16 tournament doubles titles, including two Australian Opens and being a finalist in mixed doubles at the US Open and at Wimbledon, and reaching the No. 1 ranking in doubles in the WTA Tour rankings. Her pro career doubles record was 200–71. However, her singles career plateaued after 1999. For the most part, she managed to retain her ranking between 10 and 15 (her career high singles ranking was No.8), but her expected finals breakthrough failed to occur; she only reached four finals out of 130 singles tournaments, never in a Grand Slam event, and never won one.

Her singles record is 209–129. Her final playing years were marred by a string of injuries, especially back injuries, which caused her ranking to erode gradually. As a personality Kournikova was among the most common search strings for both articles and images in her prime.

=== 2004–present: Exhibitions and World Team Tennis ===
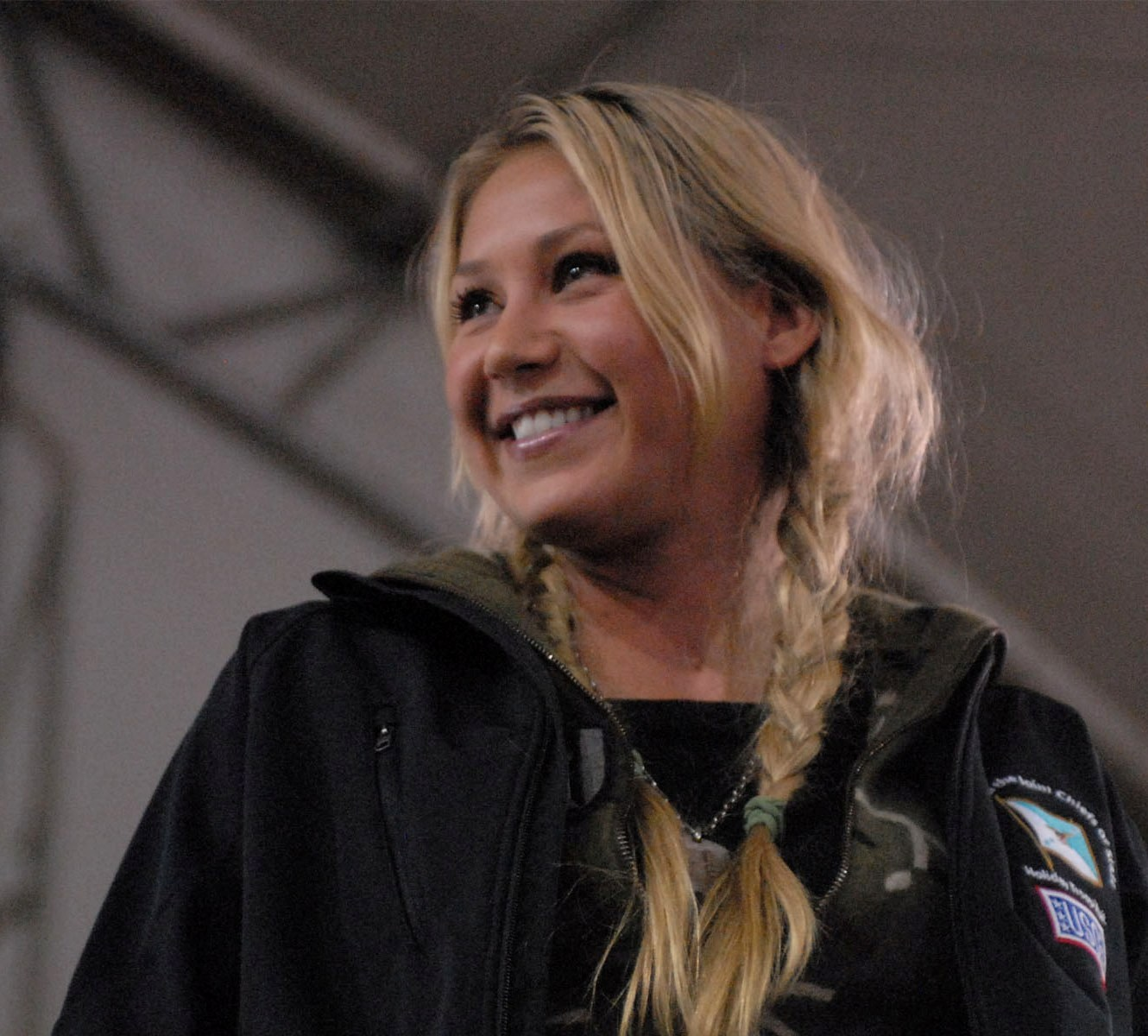
Kournikova at a USO-sponsored tour at Forward Operating Base Sharana on 15 December 2009

Kournikova played exhibition matches for charitable causes after retiring from professional tennis. In late 2004, she participated in three events organized by Elton John and by fellow tennis players Serena Williams and Andy Roddick. In January 2005, she played in a doubles charity event for the Indian Ocean tsunami with John McEnroe, Andy Roddick, and Chris Evert. In November 2005, she teamed up with Martina Hingis, playing against Lisa Raymond and Samantha Stosur in the WTT finals for charity. Kournikova is also a member of the St. Louis Aces in the World Team Tennis (WTT), playing doubles only.

In September 2008, Kournikova showed up for the 2008 Nautica Malibu Triathlon held at Zuma Beach in Malibu, California. The Race raised funds for children's Hospital Los Angeles. She won that race for women's K-Swiss team. On 27 September 2008, Kournikova played exhibition mixed doubles matches in Charlotte, North Carolina, partnering with Tim Wilkison and Karel Nováček. Kournikova and Wilkison defeated Jimmy Arias and Chanda Rubin, and then Kournikova and Novacek defeated Rubin and Wilkison.

On 12 October 2008, Anna Kournikova played one exhibition match for the annual charity event, hosted by Billie Jean King and Elton John, and raised more than $400,000 for the Elton John AIDS Foundation and Atlanta AIDS Partnership Fund. She played doubles with Andy Roddick (they were coached by David Chang) versus Martina Navratilova and Jesse Levine (coached by Billie Jean King); Kournikova and Roddick won.

Kournikova was one of "four former world No. 1 players" who participated in "Legendary Night", held on 2 May 2009, at the Turning Stone Event Center in Verona, New York, the others being John McEnroe (who had been No. 1 in both singles and doubles), Tracy Austin and Jim Courier (both of whom who had been No. 1 in singles but not doubles). The exhibition included a mixed doubles match in which McEnroe and Kournikova defeated Courier and Austin.

In 2008, she was named a spokesperson for K-Swiss. In 2005, Kournikova stated that if she were 100% fit, she would like to come back and compete again.

In June 2010, Kournikova reunited with her doubles partner Martina Hingis to participate in competitive tennis for the first time in seven years in the Invitational Ladies Doubles event at Wimbledon. On 29 June 2010 they defeated the British pair Samantha Smith and Anne Hobbs.

== Playing style ==
Kournikova plays right-handed with a two-handed backhand. She is a great player at the net. She can hit forceful groundstrokes and also drop shots.

Her playing style fits the profile for a doubles player, and is complemented by her height. She has been compared to such doubles specialists as Pam Shriver and Peter Fleming.

== Personal life ==
Kournikova was in a relationship with fellow Russian Pavel Bure, an NHL ice hockey player. The two met in 1999, when Kournikova was still linked to Bure's former Russian teammate Sergei Fedorov. Bure and Kournikova were reported to have been engaged in 2000 after a reporter took a photo of them together in a Florida restaurant where Bure supposedly asked Kournikova to marry him. As the story made headlines in Russia, where they were both heavily followed in the media as celebrities, Bure and Kournikova both denied any engagement. Kournikova, 10 years younger than Bure, was 18 years old at the time.

Fedorov claimed that he and Kournikova were married in 2001, and divorced in 2003. Kournikova's representatives deny any marriage to Fedorov; however, Fedorov's agent Pat Brisson claims that although he does not know when they got married, he knew "Fedorov was married".

Kournikova started dating Spanish singer Enrique Iglesias in late 2001 after she had appeared in his music video for "Escape". The couple have four children together: fraternal twins, a son and daughter, born on 16 December 2017; a daughter born on 30 January 2020, and a fourth child born on 17 December 2025.

It was reported in 2010 that Kournikova had become an American citizen.

== Media publicity ==
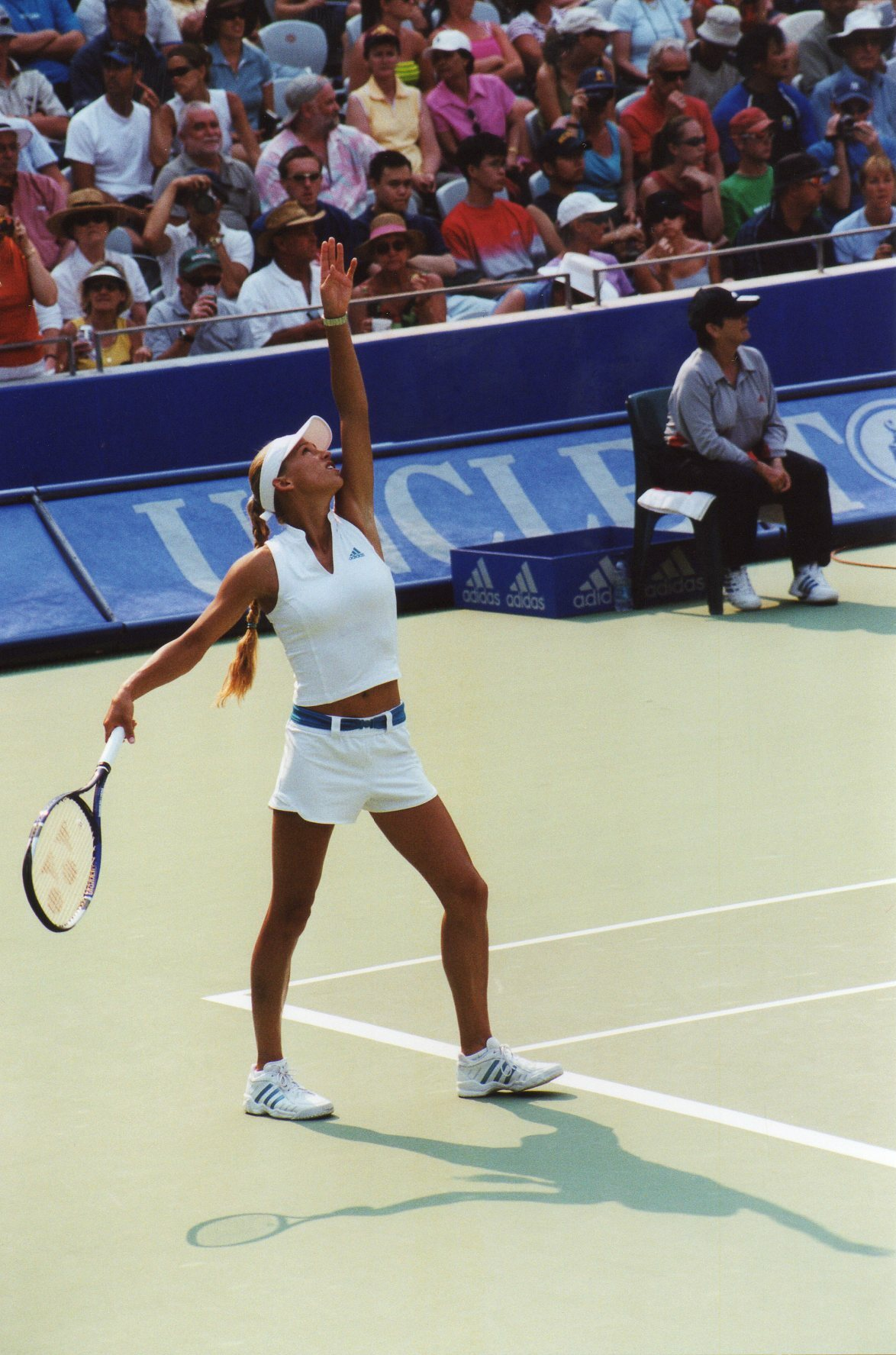
Kournikova preparing to serve in 2002

In 2000, Kournikova became the new face for Berlei's shock absorber sports bras, and appeared in the "only the ball should bounce" billboard campaign. Following that, she was cast by the Farrelly brothers for a minor role in the 2000 film Me, Myself & Irene starring Jim Carrey and Renée Zellweger. Photographs of her have appeared on covers of various publications, including men's magazines, such as one in the much-publicized 2004 Sports Illustrated Swimsuit Issue, where she posed in bikinis and swimsuits, as well as in FHM and Maxim.

Kournikova was named one of People's 50 Most Beautiful People in 1998 and was voted "hottest female athlete" on ESPN.com. In 2002, she also placed first in FHM's 100 Sexiest Women in the World in US and UK editions. By contrast, ESPN – citing the degree of hype as compared to actual accomplishments as a singles player – ranked Kournikova 18th in its "25 Biggest Sports Flops of the Past 25 Years". Kournikova was also ranked No. 1 in the ESPN Classic series "Who's number 1?" when the series featured sport's most overrated athletes.

In 2002, Penthouse magazine published paparazzi photographs that purported to show Kournikova sunbathing topless on a Florida beach. Stating that the images were not of her, Kournikova sued the magazine's parent company, seeking damages of $10 million. The woman featured in the images, Judith E. Soltesz-Benetton, daughter-in-law of fashion designer Luciano Benetton, also sued for $10 million, saying the photos had been taken without her knowledge seven years earlier. Penthouse issued apologies to both women, withdrew the issue from further distribution, and settled the cases out of court.

She continued to be the most searched athlete on the Internet through 2008 even though she had retired from the professional tennis circuit years earlier. After slipping from first to sixth among athletes in 2009, she moved back up to third place among athletes in terms of search popularity in 2010.

In October 2010, Kournikova headed to NBC's The Biggest Loser where she led the contestants in a tennis-workout challenge. In May 2011, it was announced that Kournikova would join The Biggest Loser as a regular celebrity trainer in season 12. She did not return for season 13.

== Legacy and influence on popular culture ==
- A variation of a White Russian made with skim milk is known as an Anna Kournikova.
- A video game featuring Kournikova's licensed appearance, titled Anna Kournikova's Smash Court Tennis, was developed by Namco and released for the PlayStation in Japan and Europe in November 1998.
- A computer virus named after her spread worldwide beginning on 12 February 2001 infecting computers through email in a matter of hours.

== Career statistics and awards ==
=== Doubles performance timeline ===
Key
| W | F | SF | QF | #R | RR | Q# | DNQ | A | NH |

(W) winner; (F) finalist; (SF) semifinalist; (QF) quarterfinalist; (#R) rounds 4, 3, 2, 1; (RR) round-robin stage; (Q#) qualification round; (DNQ) did not qualify; (A) absent; (NH) not held; (SR) strike rate (events won / competed); (W–L) win–loss record.

| Tournament | 1995 | 1996 | 1997 | 1998 | 1999 | 2000 | 2001 | 2002 | 2003 | SR | W–L |
|---|---|---|---|---|---|---|---|---|---|---|---|
Grand Slam tournaments
| Australian Open | A | A | 1R | 2R | W | SF | QF | W | 3R | 2 / 7 | 22–5 |
| French Open | A | A | 3R | SF | F | 3R | A | A | A | 0 / 4 | 13–4 |
| Wimbledon | A | A | 2R | A | A | SF | A | SF | A | 0 / 3 | 9–3 |
| US Open | A | QF | 3R | 2R | A | 2R | A | QF | A | 0 / 5 | 10–5 |
| Win–loss | 0–0 | 3–1 | 5–4 | 6–3 | 11–1 | 11–4 | 3–1 | 13–2 | 2–1 | 2 / 19 | 54–17 |
Year-end championship
| Tour Championships | A | A | A | QF | W | W | A | A | A | 2 / 3 | 6–1 |
Career statistics
| Year-end ranking | —N/a | 70 | 40 | 10 | 1 | 4 | 26 | 11 | 176 | | |

=== Grand Slam tournament finals ===
==== Doubles: 3 (2–1) ====
| Result | Year | Championship | Surface | Partner | Opponents | Score |
|---|---|---|---|---|---|---|
| Win | 1999 | Australian Open | Hard | (Switzerland) Martina Hingis | (United States) Lindsay Davenport; Natasha Zvereva | 7–5, 6–3 |
| Loss | 1999 | French Open | Clay | (Switzerland) Martina Hingis | (United States) Serena Williams (United States) Venus Williams | 3–6, 7–6^{(7–2)}, 6–8 |
| Win | 2002 | Australian Open (2) | Hard | (Switzerland) Martina Hingis | (Slovakia) Daniela Hantuchová (Spain) Arantxa Sánchez Vicario | 6–2, 6–7^{(4–7)}, 6–1 |

==== Mixed doubles: 2 (0–2) ====
| Result | Year | Championship | Surface | Partner | Opponents | Score |
|---|---|---|---|---|---|---|
| Loss | 1999 | Wimbledon | Grass | (Sweden) Jonas Björkman | (India) Leander Paes (United States) Lisa Raymond | 4–6, 6–3, 3–6 |
| Loss | 2000 | US Open | Hard | (Belarus) Max Mirnyi | (United States) Jared Palmer (Spain) Arantxa Sánchez Vicario | 4–6, 3–6 |

=== Awards ===
- 1996: WTA Newcomer of the Year
- 1999: WTA Doubles Team of the Year (with Martina Hingis)

== Books ==
- Anna Kournikova by Susan Holden (2001) (ISBN 978-1-84222-416-8 / ISBN 978-1-84222-416-8)
- Anna Kournikova by Connie Berman (2001) (Women Who Win) (ISBN 978-0-7910-6529-7 / ISBN 978-0-7910-6529-7)

Awards and achievements
| Preceded by Martina Hingis | ITF Junior World Champion; 1995 | Succeeded by Amélie Mauresmo |
| Preceded by Martina Hingis | WTA Newcomer of the Year; 1996 | Succeeded by Venus Williams |
| Preceded by Martina Hingis & Jana Novotná | WTA Doubles Team of the Year (with Martina Hingis); 1999 | Succeeded by Serena Williams & Venus Williams |
Sporting positions
| Preceded by Mariam Ramón | Orange Bowl Girls' Singles Champion; Category: 18 and under 1995 | Succeeded by Ana Alcázar |
