= California Women's Amateur Championship =

Golf tournament in the United States

Tournament information
- Location: United States
- Established: 1967

Current champion
- (China) Maggie Ma

California Women's Amateur Championship is a golf championship held in California for the state's top women amateur golfers. It has been held since 1967 with the inaugural tournament held at Pebble Beach Golf Links.

== History ==
The California Women's Amateur Championship has its origins as one of three women's state amateur tournaments in California. The first was run by the California Women's Golf Association from 1906 to 1920 when it was re-organized. The current California Women's Amateur Championship was officially formed in 1967 with its first tournament at Pebble Beach Golf Links. The idea for the tournament came from Helen Lengfeld who presented the idea to S.F.B. Morse. Entrants for the first tournament were limited to 100 applicants with the lowest handicaps. Lengfeld also served as the chairman for the first event which was won by Shelley Hamlin.

The tournament ran yearly at Pebble Beach from 1967 to 1986, then moved to Quail Lodge & Golf Club in Carmel Valley. The youngest winner of the tournament was Mina Harigae who beat Sydney Burlison in 2001. Both were 12 years old at the time.

== Winners ==
| Year | Winner | Location | Notes |
|---|---|---|---|
| 2026 | Maggie Ma | El Macero Country Club | |
| 2025 | Katelyn Kong | Santa Ana Country Club | |
| 2024 | Natalie Vo | Peninsula Golf & Country Club | |
| 2023 | Kate Villegas | La Cumbre Country Club | |
| 2022 | Annika Borrelli (2) | San Luis Obispo Country Club | |
| 2021 | Annika Borrelli | Hacienda Golf Club | |
| 2020 | Sara Camarena | Pasatiempo Golf Club | |
| 2019 | Amari Avery | Quail Lodge & Golf Course | |
| 2018 | Ty Akabane | Quail Lodge & Golf Course | |
| 2017 | Brooke Riley | Quail Lodge & Golf Course | |
| 2016 | Sabrina Iqbal | Quail Lodge & Golf Course | |
| 2015 | Jessica Luo | Quail Lodge & Golf Course (Finals played at Pebble Beach Golf Links) | |
| 2014 | Carmen Gutierrez Ballon | Quail Lodge & Golf Course | |
| 2013 | Lauren Kim | Quail Lodge & Golf Course | |
| 2012 | Angel Yin (2) | Quail Lodge & Golf Course | |
| 2011 | Jenni Jenq | Quail Lodge & Golf Course | |
| 2010 | Angel Yin | Quail Lodge & Golf Course | |
| 2009 | Casie Cathrea | Quail Lodge & Golf Course | |
| 2008 | Jennifer Johnson | Quail Lodge & Golf Course | |
| 2007 | Lynne Cowan (4) | Quail Lodge & Golf Course | |
| 2006 | Marianne Towersey | Quail Lodge & Golf Course | |
| 2005 | Lynne Cowan (3) | Quail Lodge & Golf Course | |
| 2004 | Mina Harigae (4) | Quail Lodge & Golf Course | |
| 2003 | Mina Harigae (3) | Quail Lodge & Golf Course | |
| 2002 | Mina Harigae (2) | Quail Lodge & Golf Course | |
| 2001 | Mina Harigae | Quail Lodge & Golf Course | |
| 2000 | Lynne Cowan (2) | Quail Lodge & Golf Course | |
| 1999 | Lynne Cowan | Quail Lodge & Golf Course | |
| 1998 | Corey Weworski | Quail Lodge & Golf Course | |
| 1997 | Natalie Gulbis | Quail Lodge & Golf Course | |
| 1996 | Dorothy Delasin | Quail Lodge & Golf Course | |
| 1995 | Leigh Casey | Quail Lodge & Golf Course | |
| 1994 | Andrea Gaston (2) | Quail Lodge & Golf Course | |
| 1993 | Andrea Gaston | Quail Lodge & Golf Course | |
| 1992 | Wendy Kaupp | Quail Lodge & Golf Course | |
| 1991 | Amy Fruhwirth | Quail Lodge & Golf Course | |
| 1990 | Claudine Rubin | Quail Lodge & Golf Course | |
| 1989 | Terri Melanson | Quail Lodge & Golf Course | |
| 1988 | Emilee Klein | Quail Lodge & Golf Course | |
| 1987 | Caroline Keggi | Quail Lodge & Golf Course | |
| 1986 | Cindy Scholefield | Pebble Beach Golf Links | |
| 1985 | Anne Quast Sander | Pebble Beach Golf Links | |
| 1984 | Susan Tonkin | Pebble Beach Golf Links | |
| 1983 | Patricia Cornett | Pebble Beach Golf Links | |
| 1982 | Debbie Weldon | Pebble Beach Golf Links | |
| 1981 | Juli Inkster | Pebble Beach Golf Links | |
| 1980 | Mary Enright | Pebble Beach Golf Links | |
| 1979 | Sally Voss-Krueger | Pebble Beach Golf Links | |
| 1978 | Patty Sheehan (2) | Pebble Beach Golf Links | |
| 1977 | Patty Sheehan | Pebble Beach Golf Links | |
| 1976 | Marianne Bretton | Pebble Beach Golf Links | |
| 1975 | Pat Cornett | Pebble Beach Golf Links | |
| 1974 | Mary Elizabeth Shea | Pebble Beach Golf Links | |
| 1973 | Amy Alcott | Pebble Beach Golf Links | |
| 1972 | Barbara Handley (2) | Pebble Beach Golf Links | |
| 1971 | Barbara Handley | Pebble Beach Golf Links | |
| 1970 | Shelley Hamlin (4) | Pebble Beach Golf Links | |
| 1969 | Shelley Hamlin (3) | Pebble Beach Golf Links | |
| 1968 | Shelley Hamlin (2) | Pebble Beach Golf Links | |
| 1967 | Shelley Hamlin | Pebble Beach Golf Links | |
