= Barbara Handley =

American amateur golfer

Personal information
- Nationality: United States
- Born: Carmel Valley, California, U.S.

Career
- Sport: Golf
- Status: Amateur

Barbara Handley was an American amateur golfer from Carmel Valley, California. In 1961, she was an alternate on the Curtis Cup team. Handley finished runner up in the 1970 California Women's Amateur Championship, winning the tournament in both 1971 and 1972.
