= List of WTA number 1 ranked doubles tennis players =

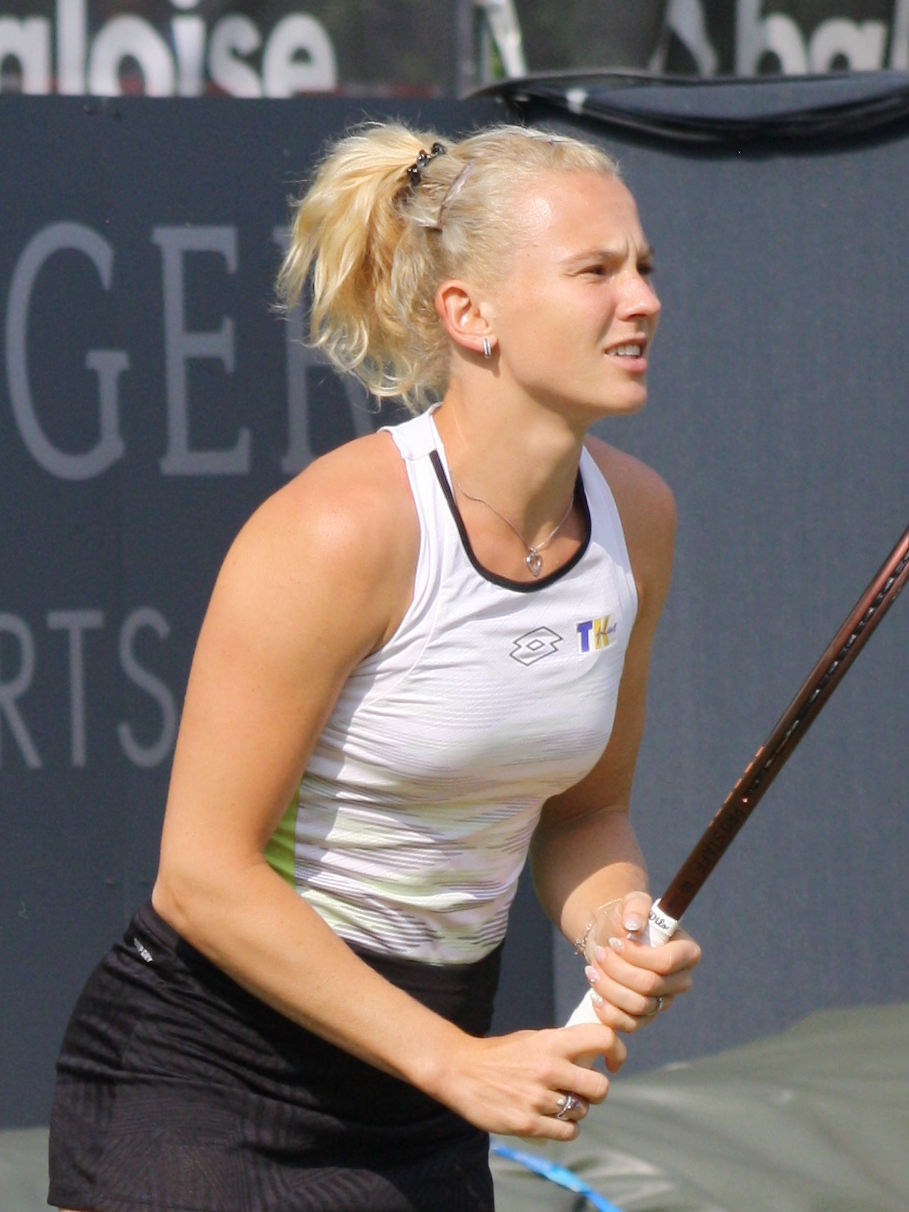
Kateřina Siniaková, currently ranked No. 1 in women's doubles.

The WTA rankings are the Women's Tennis Association's (WTA) merit-based system for determining the rankings in women's tennis. In doubles, the top-ranked team is the pair who, over the previous 52 weeks, has gathered the most WTA rankings points. Points are awarded based on how far a team advances in tournaments and the category of those tournaments. The WTA has used a computerized system for determining doubles rankings since 1984.

The current number 1 doubles player is Kateřina Siniaková.

== WTA No. 1 ranked doubles players ==
The source for the following table through the week of November 6, 2023, is the 2023 WTA Tour Official Guide Record Book, page 3.

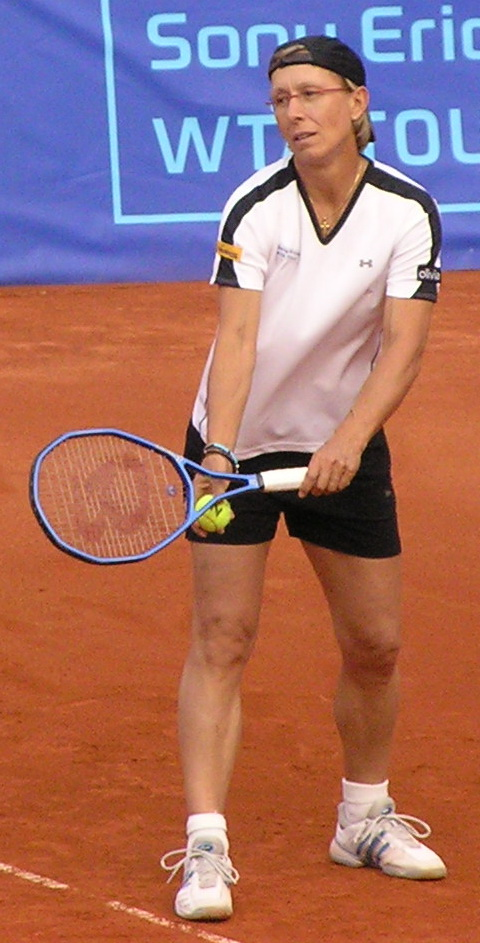
Martina Navratilova was world No. 1 in doubles for a record 237 weeks.

First-time No. 1 player.
‡ WTA rankings record.
Current World No. 1(s) (weeks are automatically updated).

No.	Player	Start date	End date	Weeks	Total
1	Martina Navratilova (USA)	Sep 4, 1984	Mar 17, 1985	27	27
2	Pam Shriver (USA)	Mar 18, 1985	Jan 19, 1986	44	44
	(United States) Martina Navratilova (2)	Jan 20, 1986	Jul 20, 1986	26	53
	(United States) Pam Shriver (2)	Jul 21, 1986	Aug 17, 1986	4	48
	(United States) Martina Navratilova (3)	Aug 18, 1986	Feb 4, 1990	181^{‡}	234
3	Helena Suková (TCH)	Feb 5, 1990	Feb 18, 1990	2	2
	(United States) Martina Navratilova (4)	Feb 19, 1990	Mar 4, 1990	2	236
	(Czechoslovakia) Helena Suková (2)	Mar 5, 1990	May 6, 1990	9	11
	(United States) Martina Navratilova (5)	May 7, 1990	May 13, 1990	1	237^{‡}
	(Czechoslovakia) Helena Suková (3)	May 14, 1990	Aug 26, 1990	15	26
4	Jana Novotná (TCH)	Aug 27, 1990	Oct 14, 1990	7	7
	(Czechoslovakia) Helena Suková (4)	Oct 15, 1990	Feb 17, 1991	18	44
	(Czechoslovakia) Jana Novotná (2)	Feb 18, 1991	Mar 3, 1991	2	9
5	Gigi Fernández (USA)	Mar 4, 1991	Mar 10, 1991	1	1
	(Czechoslovakia) Jana Novotná (3)	Mar 11, 1991	Mar 31, 1991	3	12
	(United States) Gigi Fernández (2)	Apr 1, 1991	Apr 7, 1991	1	2
	(Czechoslovakia) Helena Suková (5)	Apr 8, 1991	Jun 9, 1991	9	53
	(United States) Gigi Fernández (3)	Jun 10, 1991	Sep 8, 1991	13	15
	(Czechoslovakia) Jana Novotná (4)	Sep 9, 1991	Oct 6, 1991	4	16
6	Natasha Zvereva (URS)	Oct 7, 1991	Oct 13, 1991	1	1
	(Czechoslovakia) Jana Novotná (5)	Oct 14, 1991	Jan 26, 1992	15	31
7	Larisa Neiland (LAT)	Jan 27, 1992	Feb 2, 1992	1	1
	(Czechoslovakia) Jana Novotná (6)	Feb 3, 1992	Feb 16, 1992	2	33
	(Latvia) Larisa Neiland (2)	Feb 17, 1992	Feb 23, 1992	1	2
	(Czechoslovakia) Jana Novotná (7)	Feb 24, 1992	Mar 22, 1992	4	37
	(Latvia) Larisa Neiland (3)	Mar 23, 1992	Apr 5, 1992	2	4
	(Czechoslovakia) Jana Novotná (8)	Apr 6, 1992	Jun 14, 1992	11	48
	(Belarus) Natasha Zvereva (2)	Jun 15, 1992	Jun 21, 1992	1	2
	(Czechoslovakia) Jana Novotná (9)	Jun 22, 1992	Oct 11, 1992	15	63
	(Belarus) Natasha Zvereva (3)	Oct 12, 1992	Oct 18, 1992	1	3
8	Arantxa Sánchez Vicario (ESP)	Oct 19, 1992	Nov 15, 1992	4	4
	(Belarus) Natasha Zvereva (4)	Nov 16, 1992	Nov 22, 1992	1	4
	(Czech Republic) Helena Suková (6)	Nov 23, 1992	Jan 10, 1993	7	60
	(Belarus) Natasha Zvereva (5)	Jan 11, 1993	Apr 4, 1993	12	16
	(United States) Gigi Fernández (4)	Apr 5, 1993	Sep 12, 1993	23	38
	(Czech Republic) Helena Suková (7)	Sep 13, 1993	Oct 31, 1993	7	67
	(United States) Gigi Fernández (5)	Nov 1, 1993	Nov 14, 1993	2	40
	(Czech Republic) Helena Suková (8)	Nov 15, 1993	Nov 21, 1993	1	68
	(United States) Gigi Fernández (6)	Nov 22, 1993	Aug 14, 1994	38	78
	(Belarus) Natasha Zvereva (6)	Aug 15, 1994	Feb 12, 1995	26	42
	(Spain) Arantxa Sánchez Vicario (2)	Feb 13, 1995	Feb 26, 1995	2	6
	(Belarus) Natasha Zvereva (7)	Feb 27, 1995	Mar 5, 1995	1	43
	(United States) Gigi Fernández (7)	Mar 6, 1995	Mar 12, 1995	1	79
	(Belarus) Natasha Zvereva (8)	Mar 13, 1995	Mar 26, 1995	2	45
	(Spain) Arantxa Sánchez Vicario (3)	Mar 27, 1995	Nov 5, 1995	32	38
	(United States) Gigi Fernández (8)	Nov 6, 1995	Nov 12, 1995	1	80
	(Spain) Arantxa Sánchez Vicario (4)	Nov 13, 1995	Apr 6, 1997	73	111
	(Belarus) Natasha Zvereva (9)	Apr 7, 1997	Oct 19, 1997	29	74
9	Lindsay Davenport (USA)	Oct 20, 1997	Nov 2, 1997	2	2
	(Belarus) Natasha Zvereva (10)	Nov 3, 1997	Jan 25, 1998	12	86
	(United States) Lindsay Davenport (2)	Jan 26, 1998	Apr 12, 1998	11	13
	(Belarus) Natasha Zvereva (11)	Apr 13, 1998	Jun 7, 1998	8	94
10	Martina Hingis (SUI)	Jun 8, 1998	Aug 2, 1998	8	8
	(Czech Republic) Jana Novotná (10)	Aug 3, 1998	Aug 9, 1998	1	64
	(United States) Lindsay Davenport (3)	Aug 10, 1998	Aug 16, 1998	1	14
	(Switzerland) Martina Hingis (2)	Aug 17, 1998	Oct 25, 1998	10	18
	(Belarus) Natasha Zvereva (12)	Oct 26, 1998	Nov 1, 1998	1	95
	(Switzerland) Martina Hingis (3)	Nov 2, 1998	Nov 22, 1998	3	21
	(Belarus) Natasha Zvereva (13)	Nov 23, 1998	May 16, 1999	25	120
	(Czech Republic) Jana Novotná (11)	May 17, 1999	Jun 6, 1999	3	67
	(Switzerland) Martina Hingis (4)	Jun 7, 1999	Jul 4, 1999	4	25
	(Belarus) Natasha Zvereva (14)	Jul 5, 1999	Aug 1, 1999	4	124
	(Switzerland) Martina Hingis (5)	Aug 2, 1999	Aug 22, 1999	3	28
	(United States) Lindsay Davenport (4)	Aug 23, 1999	Nov 21, 1999	13	27
11	Anna Kournikova (RUS)	Nov 22, 1999	Jan 30, 2000	10	10
	(Switzerland) Martina Hingis (6)	Jan 31, 2000	Mar 19, 2000	7	35
	(United States) Lindsay Davenport (5)	Mar 20, 2000	Apr 2, 2000	2	29
12	Corina Morariu (USA)	Apr 3, 2000	Apr 16, 2000	2	2
	(United States) Lindsay Davenport (6)	Apr 17, 2000	May 7, 2000	3	32
	(United States) Corina Morariu (2)	May 8, 2000	Jun 11, 2000	5	7
13	Lisa Raymond (USA)	Jun 12, 2000	Aug 20, 2000	10	10
	(United States) Lisa Raymond (1)	Aug 21, 2000	Sep 10, 2000	3	13
14	Rennae Stubbs (AUS)	Aug 21, 2000	Sep 10, 2000	3	3
15	Julie Halard-Decugis (FRA)	Sep 11, 2000	Oct 22, 2000	6	6
16	Ai Sugiyama (JPN)	Oct 23, 2000	Oct 29, 2000	1	1
	(France) Julie Halard-Decugis (2)	Oct 30, 2000	Dec 24, 2000	8	14
	(Japan) Ai Sugiyama (2)	Dec 25, 2000	Aug 26, 2001	35	36
	(United States) Lisa Raymond (2)	Aug 27, 2001	Sep 8, 2002	54	67
17	Paola Suárez (ARG)	Sep 9, 2002	Aug 3, 2003	47	47
18	Kim Clijsters (BEL)	Aug 4, 2003	Aug 10, 2003	1	1
	(Japan) Ai Sugiyama (3)	Aug 11, 2003	Aug 17, 2003	1	37
	(Belgium) Kim Clijsters (2)	Aug 18, 2003	Sep 7, 2003	3	4
19	Virginia Ruano Pascual (ESP)	Sep 8, 2003	Sep 14, 2003	1	1
	(Japan) Ai Sugiyama (4)	Sep 15, 2003	Nov 9, 2003	8	45
	(Argentina) Paola Suárez (2)	Nov 10, 2003	Jul 25, 2004	37	84
	(Spain) Virginia Ruano Pascual (2)	Jul 26, 2004	Aug 1, 2004	1	2
	(Spain) Virginia Ruano Pascual (2)	Aug 2, 2004	Aug 22, 2004	3	5
	(Argentina) Paola Suárez (3)	Aug 2, 2004	Aug 22, 2004	3	87
	(Spain) Virginia Ruano Pascual (2)	Aug 23, 2004	Oct 16, 2005	60	65
20	Cara Black (ZIM)	Oct 17, 2005	Feb 5, 2006	16	16
21	Samantha Stosur (AUS)	Feb 6, 2006	Jul 6, 2006	22	22
	(United States) Lisa Raymond (3)	Jul 7, 2006	Apr 8, 2007	39	106
	(Australia) Samantha Stosur (1)	Jul 7, 2006	Apr 8, 2007	39	61
	(United States) Lisa Raymond (3)	Apr 9, 2007	Jun 10, 2007	9	115
	(Zimbabwe) Cara Black (2)	Jun 11, 2007	Jun 24, 2007	2	18
	(United States) Lisa Raymond (4)	Jun 25, 2007	Jul 8, 2007	2	117
	(Zimbabwe) Cara Black (3)	Jul 9, 2007	Nov 11, 2007	18	36
	(Zimbabwe) Cara Black (3)	Nov 12, 2007	Apr 18, 2010	127	163
22	Liezel Huber (USA)	Nov 12, 2007	Apr 18, 2010	127	127
	(United States) Liezel Huber (1)	Apr 19, 2010	Jun 6, 2010	7	134
23	Serena Williams (USA)	Jun 7, 2010	Aug 1, 2010	8	8
24	Venus Williams (USA)	Jun 7, 2010	Aug 1, 2010	8	8
	(United States) Liezel Huber (2)	Aug 2, 2010	Oct 31, 2010	13	147
25	Gisela Dulko (ARG)	Nov 1, 2010	Feb 27, 2011	17	17
	(Argentina) Gisela Dulko (1)	Feb 28, 2011	Apr 17, 2011	7	24
26	Flavia Pennetta (ITA)	Feb 28, 2011	Apr 17, 2011	7	7
	(Italy) Flavia Pennetta (1)	Apr 18, 2011	Jul 4, 2011	11	18
27	Květa Peschke (CZE)	Jul 4, 2011	Sep 11, 2011	10	10
28	Katarina Srebotnik (SLO)	Jul 4, 2011	Sep 11, 2011	10	10
	(United States) Liezel Huber (3)	Sep 12, 2011	Apr 22, 2012	32	179
	(United States) Liezel Huber (3)	Apr 23, 2012	Sep 9, 2012	20	199
	(United States) Lisa Raymond (5)	Apr 23, 2012	Sep 9, 2012	20	137
29	Sara Errani (ITA)	Sep 10, 2012	Oct 14, 2012	5	5
30	Roberta Vinci (ITA)	Oct 15, 2012	Apr 28, 2013	28	28
	(Italy) Roberta Vinci (1)	Apr 29, 2013	Feb 16, 2014	42	70
	(Italy) Sara Errani (2)	Apr 29, 2013	Feb 16, 2014	42	47
31	Peng Shuai (CHN)	Feb 17, 2014	May 11, 2014	12	12
	(China) Peng Shuai (1)	May 12, 2014	May 18, 2014	1	13
32	Hsieh Su-wei (TPE)	May 12, 2014	May 18, 2014	1	1
	(China) Peng Shuai (1)	May 19, 2014	Jun 8, 2014	3	16
	(China) Peng Shuai (1)	Jun 9, 2014	Jul 6, 2014	4	20
	(Chinese Taipei) Hsieh Su-wei (2)	Jun 9, 2014	Jul 6, 2014	4	5
	(Italy) Roberta Vinci (2)	Jul 7, 2014	Apr 12, 2015	40	110
	(Italy) Sara Errani (3)	Jul 7, 2014	Apr 12, 2015	40	87
33	Sania Mirza (IND)	Apr 13, 2015	Jan 17, 2016	40	40
	(India) Sania Mirza (1)	Jan 18, 2016	Aug 21, 2016	31	71
	(Switzerland) Martina Hingis (7)	Jan 18, 2016	Aug 21, 2016	31	66
	(India) Sania Mirza (1)	Aug 22, 2016	Jan 8, 2017	20	91
34	Bethanie Mattek-Sands (USA)	Jan 9, 2017	Aug 20, 2017	32	32
35	Lucie Šafářová (CZE)	Aug 21, 2017	Oct 1, 2017	6	6
	(Switzerland) Martina Hingis (8)	Oct 2, 2017	Oct 22, 2017	3	69
	(Switzerland) Martina Hingis (8)	Oct 23, 2017	Mar 18, 2018	21	90
36	Latisha Chan (TPE)	Oct 23, 2017	Mar 18, 2018	21	21
	(Chinese Taipei) Latisha Chan (1)	Mar 19, 2018	Jun 10, 2018	12	33
37	Ekaterina Makarova (RUS)	Jun 11, 2018	Jul 15, 2018	5	5
38	Elena Vesnina (RUS)	Jun 11, 2018	Jul 15, 2018	5	5
39	Tímea Babos (HUN)	Jul 16, 2018	Aug 12, 2018	4	4
	(Chinese Taipei) Latisha Chan (2)	Aug 13, 2018	Aug 19, 2018	1	34
	(Hungary) Tímea Babos (2)	Aug 20, 2018	Oct 21, 2018	9	13
40	Barbora Krejčíková (CZE)	Oct 22, 2018	Jan 13, 2019	12	12
41	Kateřina Siniaková (CZE)	Oct 22, 2018	Jan 13, 2019	12	12
	(Czech Republic) Kateřina Siniaková (2)	Jan 14, 2019	Jun 9, 2019	21	33
42	Kristina Mladenovic (FRA)	Jun 10, 2019	Jul 14, 2019	5	5
43	Barbora Strýcová (CZE)	Jul 15, 2019	Oct 6, 2019	12	12
	(France) Kristina Mladenovic (2)	Oct 7, 2019	Oct 20, 2019	2	7
	(Czech Republic) Barbora Strýcová (2)	Oct 21, 2019	Feb 2, 2020	15	27
	(Chinese Taipei) Hsieh Su-wei (3)	Feb 3, 2020	Feb 23, 2020	3	8
	(France) Kristina Mladenovic (3)	Feb 24, 2020	Mar 1, 2020	1	8
	(Chinese Taipei) Hsieh Su-wei (4)	Mar 2, 2020	Mar 22, 2020	3	11
	Rankings frozen (COVID-19)	Mar 23, 2020	Aug 9, 2020	20	
	(Chinese Taipei) Hsieh Su-wei (4)	Aug 10, 2020	Feb 21, 2021	28	39
44	Aryna Sabalenka (BLR)	Feb 22, 2021	Apr 4, 2021	6	6
	(Chinese Taipei) Hsieh Su-wei (5)	Apr 5, 2021	May 9, 2021	5	44
45	Elise Mertens (BEL)	May 10, 2021	May 16, 2021	1	1
	(France) Kristina Mladenovic (4)	May 17, 2021	Jun 13, 2021	4	12
	(Czech Republic) Barbora Krejčíková (2)	Jun 14, 2021	Jul 11, 2021	4	16
	(Belgium) Elise Mertens (2)	Jul 12, 2021	Sep 12, 2021	9	10
	(Chinese Taipei) Hsieh Su-wei (6)	Sep 13, 2021	Sep 19, 2021	1	45
	(Belgium) Elise Mertens (3)	Sep 20, 2021	Sep 26, 2021	1	11
	(Czech Republic) Barbora Krejčíková (3)	Sep 27, 2021	Oct 17, 2021	3	19
	(Belgium) Elise Mertens (4)	Oct 18, 2021	Oct 24, 2021	1	12
	(Chinese Taipei) Hsieh Su-wei (7)	Oct 25, 2021	Oct 31, 2021	1	46
	(Belgium) Elise Mertens (5)	Nov 1, 2021	Nov 7, 2021	1	13
	(Chinese Taipei) Hsieh Su-wei (8)	Nov 8, 2021	Nov 14, 2021	1	47
	(Czech Republic) Kateřina Siniaková (3)	Nov 15, 2021	Jun 5, 2022	29	62
	(Belgium) Elise Mertens (6)	Jun 6, 2022	Aug 14, 2022	10	23
46	Coco Gauff (USA)	Aug 15, 2022	Sep 11, 2022	4	4
	(Czech Republic) Kateřina Siniaková (4)	Sep 12, 2022	Sep 10, 2023	52	114
	(United States) Coco Gauff (2)	Sep 11, 2023	Sep 17, 2023	1	5
47	Jessica Pegula (USA)	Sep 11, 2023	Sep 17, 2023	1	1
	(Czech Republic) Kateřina Siniaková (5)	Sep 18, 2023	Sep 24, 2023	1	115
	(Belgium) Elise Mertens (7)	Sep 25, 2023	Oct 22, 2023	4	27
	(United States) Coco Gauff (3)	Oct 23, 2023	Nov 5, 2023	2	7
	(United States) Jessica Pegula (2)	Oct 23, 2023	Nov 5, 2023	2	3
48	Storm Hunter (AUS)	Nov 6, 2023	Jan 28, 2024	12	12
	(Belgium) Elise Mertens (8)	Jan 29, 2024	Mar 17, 2024	7	34
	(Chinese Taipei) Hsieh Su-wei (9)	Mar 18, 2024	Jun 9, 2024	12	59
	(Belgium) Elise Mertens (9)	Jun 10, 2024	Jul 14, 2024	5	39
49	Erin Routliffe (NZL)	Jul 15, 2024	Sep 8, 2024	8	8
	(Czech Republic) Kateřina Siniaková (6)	Sep 9, 2024	Jul 27, 2025	46	161
50	Taylor Townsend (USA)	Jul 28, 2025	Sep 21, 2025	8	8
	(Czech Republic) Kateřina Siniaková (7)	Sep 22, 2025	Feb 1, 2026	19	180
	(Belgium) Elise Mertens (10)	Feb 2, 2026	May 3, 2026	13	52
	(Czech Republic) Kateřina Siniaková (8)	May 4, 2026	Present	29	209

== Weeks at No. 1 ==
Current No. 1 player (weeks are automatically updated).

Active players in bold.

=== Total ===
No.	Player	Weeks
1	(United States) Martina Navratilova	237
2	(Czech Republic) **Kateřina Siniaková**	**209**
3	(United States) Liezel Huber	199
4	(Zimbabwe) Cara Black	163
5	(United States) Lisa Raymond	137
6	(Belarus) Natasha Zvereva	124
7	(Spain) Arantxa Sánchez Vicario	111
8	(Italy) Roberta Vinci	110
9	(India) Sania Mirza	91
10	(Switzerland) Martina Hingis	90
11	(Italy) **Sara Errani**	87
11	(Argentina) Paola Suárez	87
13	(United States) Gigi Fernández	80
14	(Czech Republic) Helena Suková	68
15	(Czech Republic) Jana Novotná	67
16	(Spain) Virginia Ruano Pascual	65
17	(Australia) Samantha Stosur	61
18	(Chinese Taipei) **Hsieh Su-wei**	59
19	(Belgium) **Elise Mertens**	52
20	(United States) Pam Shriver	48
21	(Japan) Ai Sugiyama	45
22	(Chinese Taipei) Latisha Chan	34
23	(United States) Lindsay Davenport	32
23	(United States) Bethanie Mattek-Sands	32
25	(Czech Republic) Barbora Strýcová	27
26	(Argentina) Gisela Dulko	24
27	(China) Peng Shuai	20
28	(Czech Republic) **Barbora Krejčíková**	19
29	(Italy) Flavia Pennetta	18
30	(France) Julie Halard-Decugis	14
31	(Hungary) Tímea Babos	13
32	(France) **Kristina Mladenovic**	12
32	(Australia) **Storm Hunter**	12
34	(Russia) Anna Kournikova	10
34	(Czech Republic) Květa Peschke	10
34	(Slovenia) Katarina Srebotnik	10
37	(United States) **Serena Williams**	8
37	(United States) **Venus Williams**	8
37	(New Zealand) **Erin Routliffe**	8
37	(United States) **Taylor Townsend**	8
41	(United States) Corina Morariu	7
41	(United States) **Coco Gauff**	7
43	(Czech Republic) Lucie Šafářová	6
43	(Belarus) **Aryna Sabalenka**	6
45	(Russia) Ekaterina Makarova	5
45	(Russia) Elena Vesnina	5
47	(Belgium) Kim Clijsters	4
47	(Latvia) Larisa Neiland	4
49	(Australia) Rennae Stubbs	3
49	(United States) **Jessica Pegula**	3

=== Consecutive ===
No.	Player	Weeks
1	(United States) Martina Navratilova	181
2	(Zimbabwe) Cara Black	145
3	(United States) Liezel Huber	134
4	(India) Sania Mirza	91
5	(Spain) Arantxa Sánchez Vicario	73
6	(Italy) Roberta Vinci	70
7	(Spain) Virginia Ruano Pascual	64
8	(Australia) Samantha Stosur	61
9	(United States) Lisa Raymond	54
10	(United States) Liezel Huber (2)	52
10	(Czech Republic) Kateřina Siniaková	52
12	(United States) Lisa Raymond (2)	48
13	(Argentina) Paola Suárez	47
14	(Czech Republic) Kateřina Siniaková (2)	46
15	(United States) Pam Shriver	44
16	(Italy) Sara Errani	42
17	(Italy) Sara Errani (2)	40
17	(Italy) Roberta Vinci (2)	40
19	(United States) Gigi Fernández	38
20	(Argentina) Paola Suárez (2)	37
	current streak in **bold**.	

Weeks are updated automatically.

== Year-end No. 1 players ==
=== By year ===
Year	Player	Team
1984	Martina Navratilova (USA)	Martina Navratilova (USA); Pam Shriver (USA)
1985	Pam Shriver (USA)	(United States) Martina Navratilova (2) (United States) Pam Shriver (2)
1986	(United States) Martina Navratilova (2)	(United States) Martina Navratilova (3) (United States) Pam Shriver (3)
1987^{*}	(United States) Martina Navratilova (3)	(United States) Martina Navratilova (4) (United States) Pam Shriver (4)
1988^{*}	(United States) Martina Navratilova (4)	(United States) Martina Navratilova (5) (United States) Pam Shriver (5)
1989^{*}	(United States) Martina Navratilova (5)	Helena Suková (TCH); Jana Novotná (TCH)
1990	Helena Suková (TCH)	(Czechoslovakia) Helena Suková (2) (Czechoslovakia) Jana Novotná (2)
1991	Jana Novotná (TCH)	Gigi Fernández (USA) (Czechoslovakia) Jana Novotná (3)
1992	(Czechoslovakia) Helena Suková (2)	Larisa Neiland (LAT); Natasha Zvereva (BLR)
1993	Gigi Fernández (USA)	(United States) Gigi Fernández (2) (Belarus) Natasha Zvereva (2)
1994	Natasha Zvereva (BLR)	(United States) Gigi Fernández (3) (Belarus) Natasha Zvereva (3)
1995	Arantxa Sánchez Vicario (ESP)	(United States) Gigi Fernández (4) (Belarus) Natasha Zvereva (4)
1996^{*}	(Spain) Arantxa Sánchez Vicario (2)	(Czech Republic) Jana Novotná (4); Arantxa Sánchez Vicario (ESP)
1997	(Belarus) Natasha Zvereva (2)	(United States) Gigi Fernández (5) (Belarus) Natasha Zvereva (5)
1998	(Belarus) Natasha Zvereva (3)	Martina Hingis (SUI) (Czech Republic) Jana Novotná (5)
1999	Anna Kournikova (RUS)	(Switzerland) Martina Hingis (2); Anna Kournikova (RUS)
2000	Ai Sugiyama (JPN)	Serena Williams (USA); Venus Williams (USA)
2001	Lisa Raymond (USA)	Lisa Raymond (USA); Rennae Stubbs (AUS)
2002	Paola Suárez (ARG)	Virginia Ruano Pascual (ESP); Paola Suárez (ARG)
2003	(Argentina) Paola Suárez (2)	(Spain) Virginia Ruano Pascual (2) (Argentina) Paola Suárez (2)
2004	Virginia Ruano Pascual (ESP)	(Spain) Virginia Ruano Pascual (3) (Argentina) Paola Suárez (3)
2005	Cara Black (ZIM)	(United States) Lisa Raymond (2); Samantha Stosur (AUS)
2006	(United States) Lisa Raymond (2); Samantha Stosur (AUS)	(United States) Lisa Raymond (3) (Australia) Samantha Stosur (2)
2007	(Zimbabwe) Cara Black (2); Liezel Huber (USA)	Cara Black (ZIM); Liezel Huber (USA)

=== By year (continued) ===
Year	Player	Team
2008^{*}	(Zimbabwe) Cara Black (3) (United States) Liezel Huber (2)	(Zimbabwe) Cara Black (2) (United States) Liezel Huber (2)
2009^{*}	(Zimbabwe) Cara Black (4) (United States) Liezel Huber (3)	(Zimbabwe) Cara Black (3) (United States) Liezel Huber (3)
2010	Gisela Dulko (ARG)	Gisela Dulko (ARG); Flavia Pennetta (ITA)
2011	(United States) Liezel Huber (4)	Květa Peschke (CZE); Katarina Srebotnik (SLO)
2012	Roberta Vinci (ITA)	Sara Errani (ITA); Roberta Vinci (ITA)
2013^{*}	(Italy) Sara Errani (Italy) Roberta Vinci (2)	(Italy) Sara Errani (2) (Italy) Roberta Vinci (2)
2014	(Italy) Sara Errani (2) (Italy) Roberta Vinci (3)	(Italy) Sara Errani (3) (Italy) Roberta Vinci (3)
2015	Sania Mirza (IND)	(Switzerland) Martina Hingis (3); Sania Mirza (IND)
2016^{*}	(India) Sania Mirza (2)	Caroline Garcia (FRA); Kristina Mladenovic (FRA)
2017	Latisha Chan (TPE); Martina Hingis (SUI)	Latisha Chan (TPE) (Switzerland) Martina Hingis (4)
2018	Barbora Krejčíková (CZE); Kateřina Siniaková (CZE)	Barbora Krejčíková (CZE); Kateřina Siniaková (CZE)
2019	Barbora Strýcová (CZE)	Tímea Babos (HUN) (France) Kristina Mladenovic (2)
2020	Hsieh Su-wei (TPE)	(Hungary) Tímea Babos (2) (France) Kristina Mladenovic (3)
2021	(Czech Republic) Kateřina Siniaková (2)	(Czech Republic) Barbora Krejčíková (2) (Czech Republic) Kateřina Siniaková (2)
2022	(Czech Republic) Kateřina Siniaková (3)	(Czech Republic) Barbora Krejčíková (3) (Czech Republic) Kateřina Siniaková (3)
2023	Storm Hunter (AUS)	Storm Hunter (AUS); Elise Mertens (BEL)
2024	(Czech Republic) Kateřina Siniaková (4)	(Italy) Sara Errani (4); Jasmine Paolini (ITA)
2025	(Czech Republic) Kateřina Siniaková (5)	(Czech Republic) Kateřina Siniaková (4); Taylor Townsend (USA)
2026	(Czech Republic) Kateřina Siniaková (6)	(Czech Republic) Kateřina Siniaková (5) (United States) Taylor Townsend (2)

*	Player was ranked No. 1 throughout the calendar year.

=== Per player ===
No.	Total
6	(Czech Republic) Kateřina Siniaková
5	(United States) Martina Navratilova
4	(Zimbabwe) Cara Black
4	(United States) Liezel Huber
3	(Belarus) / (Belarus) Natasha Zvereva
3	(Italy) Roberta Vinci
2	(Czech Republic) Helena Suková
2	(Spain) Arantxa Sánchez Vicario
2	(Argentina) Paola Suárez
2	(United States) Lisa Raymond
2	(Italy) Sara Errani
2	(India) Sania Mirza

=== Per team ===
No.	Total
5	(United States) Martina Navratilova (United States) Pam Shriver
4	(United States) Gigi Fernández (Belarus) / (Belarus) Natasha Zvereva
3	(Spain) Virginia Ruano Pascual (Argentina) Paola Suárez
3	(Zimbabwe) Cara Black (United States) Liezel Huber
3	(Italy) Sara Errani (Italy) Roberta Vinci
3	(Czech Republic) Barbora Krejčíková (Czech Republic) Kateřina Siniaková
2	(Czech Republic) Helena Suková (Czech Republic) Jana Novotná
2	(United States) Lisa Raymond (Australia) Samantha Stosur
2	(Hungary) Tímea Babos (France) Kristina Mladenovic
2	(Czech Republic) Kateřina Siniaková (United States) Taylor Townsend

== Players who became No. 1 without having won a Grand Slam ==
Player	First ranked No. 1	First Grand Slam final	First Grand Slam title
(Argentina) Gisela Dulko	November 1, 2010	2011 Australian Open (January 2011) (only final)	2011 Australian Open (only title)
(India) Sania Mirza	April 13, 2015	2011 French Open (June 2011) (1st of 4)	2015 Wimbledon (1st of 3)
(United States) Coco Gauff	August 15, 2022	2021 US Open (September 2021) (1st of 3)	2024 French Open (only title)
(United States) Jessica Pegula	September 11, 2023	2022 French Open (June 2022) (only final)	None (still active)
(Australia) Storm Hunter	November 6, 2023	2023 Wimbledon (July 2023) (only final)	None (still active)

== Weeks at No. 1 by decade ==
- Note: Current active No. 1 indicated in italic.

=== 1980s* ===
* — Starting in 1984

229	Navratilova

48	Shriver

=== 1990s ===
124	Zvereva

111	Sánchez Vicario

80	Fernández

68	Suková

67	Novotná

28	Hingis

27	Davenport

8	Navratilova

6	Kournikova

4	Neiland

=== 2000s ===
148	Black

117	Raymond

112	Huber

87	Suárez

65	Ruano Pascual

61	Stosur

45	Sugiyama

14	Halard-Decugis

7	Morariu

5	Davenport

4	Kournikova

4	Clijsters

3	Stubbs

=== 2010s ===
110	Vinci

91	Mirza

87	Errani

87	Huber

34	Chan

33	Siniaková

32	Mattek-Sands

24	Dulko

23	Strýcová

20	Peng

20	Raymond

18	Pennetta

15	Black

13	Babos

12	Krejčíková

10	Peschke

10	Srebotnik

8	S. Williams

8	V. Williams

7	Mladenovic

6	Šafářová

5	Hsieh

5	Makarova

5	Vesnina

=== 2020s ===
176	Siniaková

54	Hsieh

52	Mertens

12	Hunter

8	Routliffe

8	Townsend

7	Gauff

7	Krejčíková

6	Sabalenka

5	Mladenovic

4	Strýcová

3	Pegula

- Stats are updated automatically on Mondays (UTC).

== Weeks at No. 1 by country ==
- Current No. 1 player(s) indicated in **bold**.

Weeks	Country	Players
806	United States	Martina Navratilova, Pam Shriver, Gigi Fernández, Lindsay Davenport, Corina Morariu, Lisa Raymond, Liezel Huber, Venus Williams, Serena Williams, Bethanie Mattek-Sands, Coco Gauff, Jessica Pegula, Taylor Townsend
**406**	Czechoslovakia; **Czech Republic**	Helena Suková, Jana Novotná, Květa Peschke, Lucie Šafářová, Barbora Krejčíková, **Kateřina Siniaková**, Barbora Strýcová
215	Italy	Flavia Pennetta, Sara Errani, Roberta Vinci
176	Spain	Arantxa Sánchez Vicario, Virginia Ruano Pascual
163	Zimbabwe	Cara Black
129	Belarus	Natasha Zvereva*, Aryna Sabalenka
111	Argentina	Paola Suárez, Gisela Dulko
93	Chinese Taipei	Hsieh Su-wei, Latisha Chan
91	India	Sania Mirza
90	Switzerland	Martina Hingis
76	Australia	Rennae Stubbs, Samantha Stosur, Storm Hunter
56	Belgium	Kim Clijsters, Elise Mertens
45	Japan	Ai Sugiyama
26	France	Julie Halard-Decugis, Kristina Mladenovic
20	China	Peng Shuai
20	Russia	Anna Kournikova, Ekaterina Makarova, Elena Vesnina
13	Hungary	Tímea Babos
10	Slovenia	Katarina Srebotnik
8	New Zealand	Erin Routliffe
4	Latvia	Larisa Neiland
1	Soviet Union	Natasha Zvereva*

Weeks are updated automatically.
* Belarusian Natasha Zvereva spent one week at number one while playing for the Soviet Union.

== See also ==
- World number 1 ranked female tennis players (includes rankings before 1975)
- ITF World Champions
- List of WTA number 1 ranked singles tennis players
- List of ATP number 1 ranked singles tennis players
- List of ATP number 1 ranked doubles tennis players
- Current WTA rankings
- Top ten ranked female tennis players
- Top ten ranked female tennis players (1921–1974)
- List of highest ranked tennis players per country
