= Surname inflection =

Altering a surname to reflect a condition such as gender or relationship.

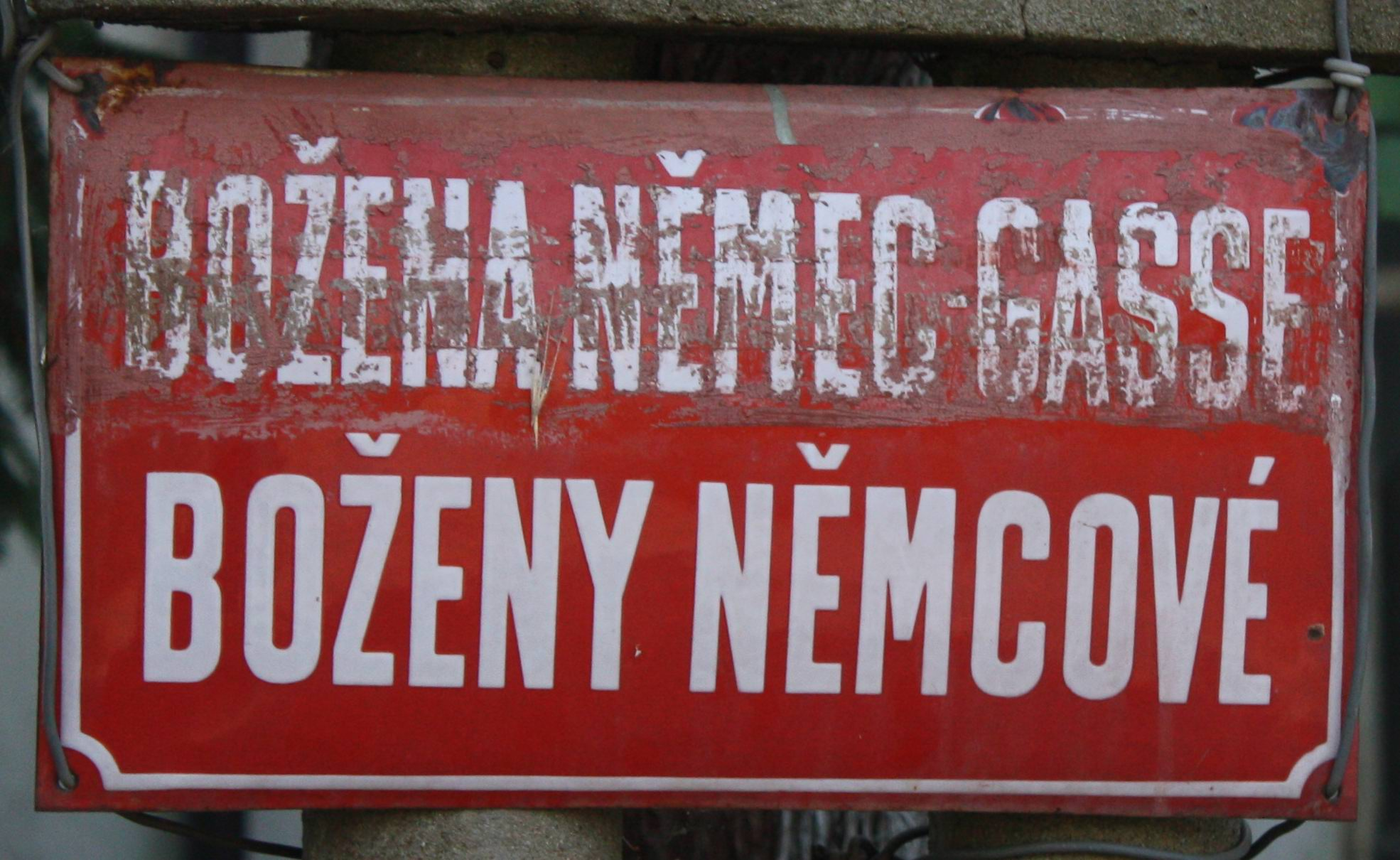
Protectorate bilingual name of Božena Němcová Street (the Czech-language name is in genitive) in Řevnice, now in Czech Republic

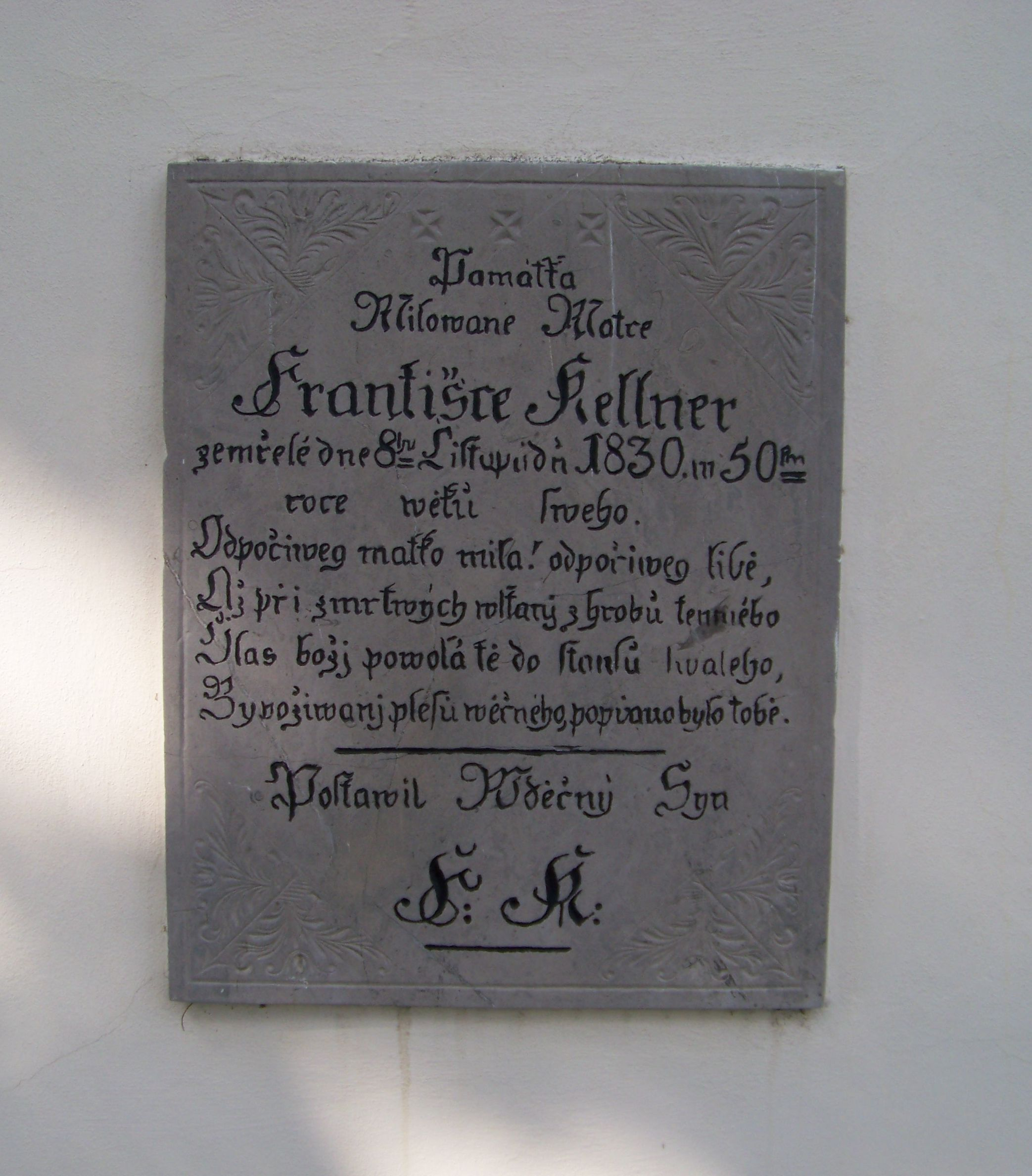
The Czech-written tombstone of Františka Kellner from 1830 in the cemetery near St. Havel in Zbraslav, Havlín, Czech Republic

In some languages and countries, surname inflection (Czech: přechylování příjmení, Polish: odmiana nazwiska, Slovak: prechyľovanie priezviska) refers to the transformation of a gendered surname. Most often, the surname is transformed from masculine to feminine by modifying the initial form of the surname. Inflection of surnames is especially typical for fusional languages, in which it is usually done with specific suffixes.

The purpose of surname inflection is usually to express the surname bearer's family status using grammatical gender.

== Slavic languages ==
=== Bulgarian ===
Most Bulgarian surnames are inflected by gender.

=== Czech ===
Surnames are inflected in accordance with the rule of agreement of subject and predicate, thereby expressing relationships in the sentence (for example, what is the podmet and what is the subject). For historical and linguistic reasons, the forms of female surnames are mainly the result of inflecting male surnames.

The female variant of the surname is usually formed from the basic male variant, making the male and female variants grammatically symmetrical. Moreover, in some other languages and cultures, maiden surnames (belonging to the father, e.g. Polish -ówna) were or are being distinguished from married surnames (belonging to the husband, e.g. Polish -owa).

Inflection rarely involves inflecting the feminine form of the surname to the masculine. When a person changes gender to masculine, is a groom who takes the bride's surname, or is the son of an unmarried mother, the masculine form is used, commonly understood as basic, uninflected.

==== Development and methods of inflection ====
As historical records testify, women's names used to be as free as men's names. A woman was therefore a separately named person, often independent of a man's name, e.g. by origin. Examples: Eliška z Křivé, žena Jana Pšeničky z Račína ("Eliška from Křivá, wife of Jan Pšenička from Račín") (1483); M. Š. Plachý koupil dvůr od Mariany Bosákovic, manželky Jakuba Koklštejna ("M.Š. Plachý bought a garden from Mariana Bosákovic, wife of Jakub Koklštejn") (1610). Gradually, several ways of writing female names became established:

- First name of the woman and her occupation (e.g., Káča děvečka, Anna kuchařka, Barbora markytánka — Káča the housemaid, Anna the cook, Barbora the sutler).
- The woman's first name and her relationship (Anna matka Probošta, Manda žena Pátka, Ludmila za Bobka, Dorota vdova po Novotným, Anna dcera Hejla). This method of writing was also used in registers kept in Latin (Ludmilla filia Jakobi Holan, Anna vidua post Vitum Slaby).
- The woman's first name combined with an adjective or noun, formed from the man's name or the name of the man's or father's occupation (e.g., Mariána ševcova, Dorota Karáskova, Kateřina mlynářka, or Anna Beranka).
- For surnames formed by an adjective, the surname is naturally distinguished (e.g., Pěkná, Malopolská, Witovská)

The inflection of (male) surnames by means of various suffixes was promoted gradually and locally differently:

- The most frequent was the suffix -ová or -ova. Notations were usually made without diacritical marks and the two suffixes are therefore indistinguishable (e.g., Svoboda to Svobodová or Svobodova). Evidence of using the suffix -ová to create feminine designations from a man's name can be found in obituaries, urbars or town books from the 14th century. The designation of women with the suffix -ová has been documented since the 15th century and primarily expressed the man's occupation, which the woman usually shared with him in some way, e.g., císařová (caesar's), hospodářová (householder's), kantorová (cantor's), or mistrová (master's). The same forms (e.g., ciesařová, králová, kupcová, mistrová) were used for women who performed the function or profession themselves. In Eastern dialects, inflected relative names were also formed in a similar way, such as dětková bába, svatová, teščová, or bratová.
- All Czech dialects have preserved inflecting names using the suffix -ka. Cejnar to Cejnarka was common but also Čech to Češka. The suffix -ka is currently used for hypokoristikon of famous women such as actresses (e.g., Bohdalka for "Jiřina Bohdalová" and Pilarka for "Eva Pilarová"), teachers, and neighbors (baba Jeremiáška), among others.
- Some combined -ová and -ka to create the ending -ovka or -ouka (e.g., židovka, krejčouka, dědouka, starostovka).
- Another, less common inflection was the suffix -na (e.g., Hřivčena), often combined with -ová to create -ovna (e.g., Přemyslovna, Stuartovna, Slavatovna, Štěchovna). Words ciesařovna (empress) and královna or králevna (queen) originally meant the daughter of the emperor, the king. The feminine patronymic in other East Slavic languages has the same form.
- The suffix -ice (Ocelice) was also used, especially in Moravia, similar to how long ago people were referred to, e.g., by their leader, ruler (e.g., Markvartici) and from that the names of the settlements (e.g., Markvartice, Vršovice).
- Naming related to the father's family persisted (e.g., Suchých).

The way of recording and the use of suffixes varied by the place and time of the recordings and the habit of the recorder. Different forms of notation could be used to name the same person (e.g., Káča, Káča Ocelice, Káča, nebožtíka Oceli dcera, Kateřina Ocelových).

In register entries written in Latin, the unbiased indication of the kinship relationship was usually used. Some register records written at the end of the 18th century in German added the suffix -in to a man's name, (e.g., Svoboda to Anna Svobodin). Other registries in Latin inflected surnames with the suffix -iana. In the register of births of the Slap parish from the years 1752–1790, the recorders had difficulties transitioning from inflecting with the suffix -iana to the forms of female surnames that were commonly used in the locality at that time. On two consecutive pages in this matrix, variants occurred in inflection, including older shapes with the suffix -iana (Svobodiana, Zbraslavskiana, Nevarziliana, Malliana), an attempt at innovation with -owin (e.g., Prawdowin), the German suffix -in (e.g., Czamskin) and Czech suffixes -a (e.g., Zbraslavska, Malla), -ova or -owa (e.g., Pankova, Kralowa).

Around the turn of the 19th and 20th centuries, many publications proposed -ová should be used for married and widowed women and -ova for unmarried women to distinguish them in literary language. The basis for this proposal was that unmarried women often used the possessive adjective form -ova in colloquial Czech. The proposal appeared in the Pokrok magazine discussion in 1876, appeared in the register Brusu jazyka českého from 1877 and the next two editions, and was submitted by Alois Hlavinka, Povaha česká v řeči, 1916, str. 127. The distinction was rejected by Oldřich Hujer in a paper in Listy filologické 44, 1917, str. 366.

==== Grammatical rules of inflection ====
Typically, the masculine variant of the surname takes the grammatical form of a noun, while the feminine variant acquires the form of a substantive adjective by adding the suffix -ová to the stem of the male surname. This includes surnames that are grammatically a feminine word, e.g., Vrána (crow) or Smetana (cream); as a surname they acquire the masculine gender, and the feminine variant is formed by inflection with the suffix -ová. Inflection is usually only a matter of adding the ending -ová (e.g., Jakubův becomes Jakubůvová, not Jakubová). However, some types of male surnames require dropping the ending (usually the final vowel) when creating the female variant, e.g. Vrána to Vránová. Czech grammatical principles sometimes dictate a phonetic change in the stem of the surname, typically the dropping of a vowel (e.g., Čeněk to Čeňková). Latin endings that normally fall out during declension are also not observed; for example, the inflected form of the surname Paulus is Paulusova, not Paulova.

Surnames that are hard adjectives (ending with -ý, -á, or -é) usually have a symmetrical masculine and feminine form (e.g., Nový to Nová, Dobrovský to Dobrovská). Surnames ending in -ý can also have inflected forms ending in -ýová, especially if the adjective is outdated or unfamiliar, e.g., Šurý has the inflected forms Šurá and Šurýová. For some surnames ending in -ě, the letter "t" is also added; for example, the surname Kníže can become Knížová, Knížetová and Knížeová.

For surnames that are soft adjectives (ending with -í), the masculine and feminine forms are identical and do not vary in any singular cases (e.g., Krejčí), which may make the feminine variant appear indeclinable. Therefore, these names are sometimes also inflected with the suffix -ová (paní Krejčová). If a surname ends with -í but is likely not an adjective, it is sometimes inflected, e.g. Brixí to Brixíová.

Surnames ending in "-ů" are usually uninflected and gender neutral (e.g., Janů, Martinů, Krejčů), though exceptions do occur (e.g., Jankůová, Petrůová, Pavlůová, Bratrůová). Surnames ending with -ých (e.g., Šerých) or -ovic (e.g., Novákovic) are also indeclinable. In Southern Bohemian dialects, some colloquial forms of surnames are gender neutral, especially when naming a family collective, e.g., Novákojc. Whether or not the name is inflected in these cases is governed by tradition; Mrs. Krejčů and Krejčová can be derived from the same masculine base.

Surnames formed by imperative sentences (e.g., Osolsobě, Skočdopole, Hrejsemnou, Přinesdom) may differ in practice of inflection. For example, the Osolsobová variant is not used, while the variants Skočdopolová and Přinesdomová occur.

==== Inflection of foreign surnames ====
Female surnames from foreign languages are usually adapted to the feminine form in Czech. When translating female surnames into Czech from languages that have their own inflectional means, the default feminine form is usually used, especially if the language in question uses similar methods of inflection that are comprehensible to a Czech speaker. With names from Slavic languages, the original form and declension are sometimes respected, e.g., Věrka Serďučka (second fall Serďučky), Anna Karenina but also Anna Kareninová.

If the source language uses uninflected surnames or a method of inflection incompatible with Czech grammar, the suffix -ová is usually added after the surname or its stem. This applies both to cases of Czech citizens adopting surnames of foreign origin and to communications concerning foreign citizens. In the case of translations of texts into Czech, it is recommended, from a stylistic point of view, to use foreign surnames in an italicized form (except in special cases), as this is characteristic of the Czech language system.

Sorbian female surnames of the Nowakowa type are recommended to be inflected in the Czech text as a similar Czech language. Surnames like Budarka or Nowcyna are recommended to be inflected according to the female pattern. Slanted surnames of unmarried women (e.g., Jordanojc, Nowcyc) it is recommended not to inflect, as is also the case in Czech dialects (Viděl jsem Mařku Novákojc). It is not recommended to mechanically inflect the surnames of unmarried women (e.g., Kubašec – Kubašecová – Kubašecové), as forms that do not occur in Sorbian would be formed.

Icelandic patronymic or matronymic surnames are commonly inflected in Czech language. Inflection is done with the standard extension -ová, which joins either the entire feminine form of the patronymic surname (Garðarsdóttirová) or the male form if only that is known (Garðarssonová, possibly Garðarová). It is also possible to indicate the feminine gender of the bearer of the surname with auxiliary words (e.g., paní Garðarsdóttir — "ms. Garðarsdóttir" ), especially if the text is intended for readers who are expected to know Germanic languages. They sometimes reject the inflection of Icelandic names.

The uninflected form of the surname is often respected for very well-known personalities whose names are established and familiar and thus have no risk of misunderstanding, e.g., Marilyn Monroe (indeclinable). Sometimes names that would be difficult to pronounce in an inflected form are not inflected, e.g., Lucy Liu. At the same time, inflected and uninflected variants can be used side by side.

==== Uninflection trend ====
The use of female surnames in the uninflected form was common in Czech mainly due to contact with the German-speaking environment, including the administrative and social influence of the Habsburg monarchy, the centuries-old presence of the German minority in the Czech lands, and the bilingualism of a significant part of the population and official processes. At the same time, each of the languages treated surnames according to its own rules, and in many cases these rules overlapped. The trend of consistent deviation occurred especially within the framework of de-Germanization after the expulsion of the majority of Germans. As stated by Jana Valdrová, a linguist, Germanist and gender researcher from the University of South Bohemia: "Before the war, German, Jewish and Czech populations lived side by side. One woman was called Marie Jelinek and another Marie Jelínková. There were no rules about inflection." In the registers of Czech municipalities there are entries of female names such as Theresia Wolker, Anna Procházka, Eva Vykopal. According to Valdrová, widespread deviations only started after the Second World War, initiated by linguist František Oberpfalcer, who was renamed Jílek after the war.

The trend of not inflecting the surname intensified after 2000, especially among Czechs who married foreigners or had more contact with foreign countries and foreign nationals. Many women state that some foreigners "do not understand that Svoboda and Svobodová are married; they consider it to be two different names". Additionally, some women think the inflected suffix sounds Russian and makes them appear too Russian. Sometimes, women simply think the original form sounds better, is more practical because of its brevity, or is an important expression of personal free choice. According to psychologist Lenka Čadová, women usually resort to these trends with the intention of increasing visibility or a more attractive image.

Discussions about inflection have developed due to the activities of prominent women, such as TV presenters Emma Smetana, Petra Svoboda and Tereza Robinson; politician Karolína Peake; sportswoman Kateřina Emmons (née Kůrková); philanthropist Michaela Bakala; and businesswoman Ivana Tykač. Petra Svoboda has stated that she uses an uninflected surname because she and her husband spent several years in Arab countries and often traveled to countries where the population was unable to understand the connection between the inflected and uninflected forms. Emma Smetana uses the surname Smetana in her French documents and Smetanová in her Czech documents, but since she spent most of her life abroad, she only uses the uninflected version, with the exception of the Czech authorities: "I'm sorry to those who are irritated by this, you can't blame the last name. I am half Czech, half French." In the media, the names of Deputy Minister of Health Lenka Teska Arnoštová and Deputy Minister of Labor Zuzana Jentschke Stöcklová attracted attention.

==== Controversy surrounding uninflected surnames ====
A number of people may have problems with how uninflected feminine surnames inflect. Some individuals are unable or unwilling to use the uninflected version of the last name. Some newly married women with an uninflected last name, who are at a loss because they do not know how to deal with it in communication, turn to the Ústav pro jazyk český (Institute of the Czech Language). The sentence "mám jednání s Dvořák" (I have meeting with Dvořák) is not as functional in Czech language as "s Dvořákovou", and the uninflected surname often needs to be supplemented in such a case ("s paní Dvořák"), unless the gender follows from the verb form ("Dvořák přišla"). Thus, people can inflect an uninflected female surname or use the masculine declension. Uninflected foreign-sounding surnames of women, such as Kateřina Emmons, Karolína Peake, Jana Kirschner or Dara Rolins, cause fewer problems than the use of masculine forms of Czech surnames for women (Mrs. Dvořák, Novák, Svoboda, Smetana, Bakala, Kaplický).

The argument for inflection is usually that in Czech it is not easy to apply uninflected surnames to feminine patterns and it is not possible to use masculine patterns. Without inflection, the language would encounter unnatural sentences like Williams porazila Schneider, in which the subject cannot be distinguished from the object. In Czech, for most types of surnames, the gender of its bearer can be immediately recognized from the name, which often cannot be ensured without inflection. The meaning of the sentence can be completed by description, but the torso remains, e.g. "Tenistka Williams porazila soupeřku Schneider" (Female tennis player Williams defeated her opponent Schneider). When a woman has two surnames, linguists consider it appropriate to inflect both. If only the second surname is inflected (e.g., when the model Kateřina Průšová was named Kateřina Konvalinka Průšová), the uninflected surname can be mistaken for a middle name.

When sports psychologist Katarína Bradáč commented on a hockey player's case in 2015, her name caused more discussion than the case itself. Karel Oliva, the director of Ústav pro jazyk český at the time, said, "In this form, Beard is a masculine name. If it is carried by a woman, then it probably cannot be inflected, because if we were to add a masculine inflection to it, we would inflect it incorrectly. Declension just doesn't make sense here. Assuming that it is a Czech name, then some gross mistake has been made here and it cannot be discussed when it is already wrong from the beginning." According to him, the feminine ending is the most natural sign of the feminine gender, and if someone insists that they don't want it there, they must replace it with something else, such as a first name or a title.

In 2015, Oliva spoke about "cases for which there are no rules yet". He stated that the female surname Teska is not inflected, but if it were, it would have to be inflected according to the pattern "žena" (woman). According to him, the way a name is used can also depend on family tradition and that it is also important to respect the wishes of the bearer of the name. However, according to him, inflection of this type of name according to the female form would be very on the edge, and inflection according to the male pattern would be downright incorrect. He would not inflect the surname Smetana, e.g., "dal jsem tu knížku Smetaně" (I gave that book to Smetana), stating that he finds it "a little strange". The name Eliška Kaplický has also caused controversy about whether such a surname should be inflected in Czech language (e.g., Kaplickyová). According to Oliva, Eliška Kaplický's surname should also be understood as a foreign surname and not inflected: "It sounds terrible, but the newspaper is not to blame. That is the fault of the lady who had this brilliant idea.“

Jana Valdrová is a very active promoter of uninflected surnames for women. She is of the opinion that "uninflected surnames do not cause major misunderstandings, and if they do, we can ask questions about the ambiguities". Valdrová also drew attention to the asymmetry in the use of surnames, expressing the subordination and secondary status of women: "Imagine that the world is ruled by women. Kovářka's son will be Pavel Kovářčin and after his marriage to Maria Borůvka he will take the surname Borůvčin. The suffix -in will express to which woman the given man belongs."

Valdrová pointed out that in Czech there are a number of uninflected first names (Dagmar, Miriam) and uninflected surnames (e.g., Martinů, Janů, Krejčů, Hrejsemnou, Osolsobě, Šerých). In the case of some names and surnames, the feminine variant is indeclinable (Krejčí), while the masculine has different forms in different cases. Some dialects avoid -ová by replacing it with a genderless and indeclinable ending, such as -ů, -ojc, -ovic, or -ých. Valdrová concluded from this that female surnames without -ová are grammatically correct in Czech, have been used for hundreds of years, and do not have their use hindered by any language specifics, so there is no reason to prevent their registration by legal provisions.

In 2015, Oliva opposed the view that surnames ending with -ová look like a possessive adjective: "Whoever is at least a little educated in the language knows that possessive endings look different. When someone's name is Novák, so it is Novákova kniha, never Nováková kniha. It is enough to have an elementary knowledge of the Czech language to see that this is not the case." Oliva opposes the idea that an inflected name is an insult to femininity and their emancipatory efforts.

A MF Dnes survey in 2011 investigated how people react to female surnames such as Michaela Bakal. Of those polled, 41% said that "they found such a form ridiculous and against the rules of the Czech language", and another 41% "disagreed with the non-inflection, but at the same time believed that it was everyone's business what their name was." The MF Dnes survey also showed that there are more supporters of diversion among women than among men.

==== Legal regulation of surnames in the Czech Republic ====
The use of names and surnames in common language or in the media is not regulated by law. The law does not regulate the practical application of unbiased registry (recorded) surnames of women in Czech texts, whether in written or spoken form. Some women who have an uninflected surname assume or directly demand the uninflected use, while others do not mind the common use of inflected forms of the surname. The inflection of surnames in common language use is usually preferred by linguists from Ústav pro jazyk český Akademie věd České republiky.

===== Legislation regulating the registration of surnames =====
Registration of surnames upon marriage in the Czech matrik is subject to regulation according to § 69 and § 69a of Act No. 301/2000 Coll. (version 28)., about registers, name and surname. According to it, the surnames of married people who change their surnames after marriage are formed on the basis of the Czech dictionary. On the basis of the application, the uninflected surname is entered without any other conditions. The names of offspring born out of marriage are formed on the basis of an agreement on the surnames of spouses and children without further specification. After foreign women who complained to the Czech Helsinki Committee for Human Rights in 2000, the requirement to change surnames was eased.

===== Practice of surname legal regulation =====
The registered surname entered in the register is taken over in an unchanged form in other official documents (including citizen's card) and registers. In all cases, however, it is written only in the basic form. No other principles for the declension or use of names are recorded in registers and documents and are not regulated by law. The Czech legal system does not regulate the form or use of the names of women who are not Czech citizens. If a woman with a foreign nationality is issued a document by the Czech authorities, e.g. a permanent residence permit, the name and surname are given in their original form without inflection and, if necessary, transliterated into Latin.

A specific problem is the names and surnames used by transsexual and intersexual people. Pursuant to § 72 paragraph 5 of the Registry Act No. 301/2000 Coll. the registry office will allow, based on the request of the natural person and the confirmation of the health service provider, the change of the name, or names, and surname to a neutral name and surname, if treatment for gender reassignment has been started. However, the criterion for recognition of gender-neutral surnames is usually their gender non-specificity. According to Jana Valdrová, the task of linguists is to reevaluate the criteria for determining the gender neutrality of surnames in favor of expanding the choices of surname bearers. The only handbook used by the authorities comes from Miloslava Knappová, whom Jana Valdrová evaluates by saying that she "has been performing forensic expert work since the days of deep socialism". This guide recognizes the following as gender-neutral surnames:

- originally soft adjectives or similar (e.g., Hoření or Krejčí).
- names ending with -ů, -ůj or -ův, formed from possessive adjectives (e.g., Petrů or Pavlů).
- names ending with -ých, -ech or another version of this ending.

Despite the growing number of foreign women and men in the Czech Republic, Knappová does not mention gendered foreign surnames.

===== Liberalization of uninflected surnames registration =====
In 2013, the Senate rejected a bill that would allow women to register their surnames in the masculine form based on their own decision in all cases. The proposal was submitted by the chairman of the Civic Democratic Party senate club Richard Svoboda. In 2019, the Czech Pirate Party proposed the same change. Vice Prime Minister Jan Hamáček argued against this second proposal, as "inflection of surnames is a characteristic feature of the Czech linguistic system". Linguist Karel Oliva expressed his agreement with this opinion, stating that the Czech language requires inflection throughout its grammatical structure and that clearly defined gender prevents awkward misunderstanding. The proposal of the Czech Pirate Party was also rejected.

In 2020, the Czech Republic government's representative for human rights, Kateřina Valachová, prepared a proposal for liberalization, as she stated in an interview with Czech Television. In 2021, the House passed the proposal of deputy and government commissioner for human rights Helena Válková (ANO) and deputy Ondřej Profant (Pirates). According to the proposal, Czech women will now be able to choose whether to have their surname inflected when it is entered in the Register, without having to fulfill any conditions. 91 members of parliament voted in favor, 33 voted against, and 48 abstained from voting.

As of 1 January 2022, there is no condition for the right to have a surname in the uninflected form.

=== Slovak ===
Surname inflection in Slovak developed simultaneously with the emergence of the two-name nomenclature system. The first written mention of women surname inflection in Slovakia comes from the Žilina City Book from 1454: "tehda pani Blasskowa rekla". The practice of female surname inflection declined in use in Slovakia in the second half of the 18th century, and due to the Kingdom of Hungary influence, inflection did not occur in the 19th century.

Slovak language inflects in a very similar way to Czech but has fewer exceptions. The bearer's express wish not to change her name is more often respected in Czech language than in Slovak. For example, Kateřina Emmons is often called Kateřina Emmonsová in Slovak, which almost never occurs in Czech.

=== Sorbian ===
In Lower Sorbian language, surnames are inflected differently for married and unmarried women. Names of married women most often have a suffix -owa, (e.g., Nowak to Nowakowa), similar to Czech language. There are also female surnames with the suffix -ka, which mainly come from male surnames of foreign origin (e.g., Budarka or Urbanka). Lower Sorbian language also has the suffix -ina/-yna, (e.g., Markula to Markulina, Nowka to Nowcyna).

Inflected surnames of unmarried women for male surnames ending with a consonant or -o are formed with the suffix -ojc/-jejc (e.g., Nowak to Nowakojc, Wuglaŕ to Wuglarjejc). For male surnames ending with -a, inflected forms use the suffix -ic/-yc (Markula to Markulic, Nowka to Nowcyc). Similar forms can be found in Czech dialects (e.g. Mařka Novákojc or Mařka Novákovic).

In Upper Sorbian language, surnames are also inflected differently for married and unmarried women. For married women, the suffix -owa is used to inflect male surnames ending with a consonant (e.g., Rawp to Rawpowa). Male surnames ending with -a, -o, -ski a -cki are inflected with the suffixes -ina/-yna, (e.g., Andricki to Andryccyna). Addressing with the suffix -ka (e.g., Urbanka) is considered unwritten.

Inflected surnames of unmarried women for male surnames ending with a consonant or with -ka or -ca are formed with the suffix -ec (e.g., Kral to Kralec, Čornak to Čornakec). For male surnames ending with -a or -o, inflected forms use the suffix -ic (e.g., Róla to Rólic, Nedo to Nedźic).

=== Polish ===
Female surnames created from masculine surnames capable of inflection are inflected as common feminine adjectives. However, the inflection pattern previously used for unmarried women (daughters) is being abandoned. Married women may also use unchanged (masculine form) surnames or add the uninflected surname of their husband's to their original surname.

Uninflected surnames remain so when used for women: Rozmawiałem z panią Beatą Tyszkiewicz – “I spoke with Mrs. Beata Tyszkiewicz". Many Polish women also have compound surnames. If at least one of the two names in such a combination is not inflected when used on its own, as in Janina Pawluk-Nowakowa or Mirosława Nowak-Dziemianowicz, then the compound surname as a whole remains uninflected: z Janiną Pawluk-Nowakową, z panią Mirosławą Nowak-Dziemianowicz.

Some masculine nouns of foreign origin designating professions, e.g. dyrektor, reżyser, profesor, doktor, minister, premier, prezes or prokurator, are not inflected by gender in Polish. When speaking of a woman, the title of profession is usually preceded by the word pani (polite "you") as an indication of the gender of the person ("indirect inflection"). For example, Interview with Professor Nowakova-Dziemianowicz becomes Wywiad z panią profesor Nowak-Dziemianowicz, rather than Wywiad z profesor Nowak-Dziemianowicz or Wywiad z profesorką Nowak-Dziemianowicz (although there is a colloquial inflected feminine form "profesorka").

==== Inflection rules ====
- Male surnames that are adjectives (e.g., Czarny, Farny) are inflected like adjectives by changing the grammatical gender, e.g., Czarna, Farna.
  - This also applies to the most common surnames ending in the suffix -ski or -cki, which also inflect by changing the gender to -ska or -cka, e.g., Bujnicki to Bujnicka, Ciszewski to Ciszewska.

===== Archaic and colloquial forms =====
- If the husband's surname ends with a consonant, the usual suffix is -owa, e.g., Kupisz to Kupiszowa, Michalak to Michalakowa.
  - Common masculine nouns are inflected in the same way when used to designate a female craftsman or official, e.g., kowal to kowalowa – žena kováře, kovářka.
  - With the exception of the letter -b (explained later), an unmarried woman receives the suffix -ówna [read: -uvna], e.g., Pawlak to Pawlakówna, Kupisz to Kupiszówna.
- If the husband's last name ends in the vowel -a the suffix used is -ina, e.g., Zaręba to Zarębina, Kulesza to Kuleszyna.
  - An unmarried woman's surname is formed from the father's surname with the suffix -anka or -ianka, e.g., Zaręba to Zarębianka, Kulesza to Kuleszanka).
    - The same suffix is used for unmarried women when the man's surname ends with the consonant -b, e.g., Gołąb to Gołębianka.
- In certain Polish dialects, similar to some dialects of the Czech language, the inflectional suffix -ka is used, e.g., Pawlak to Pawlaczka, Kupisz to Kupiszka (compare Czech Kubeš to Kubeška).

=== East Slavic ===
Most East Slavic surnames are inflected by gender. The surnames with suffixes -uk/yuk/-ik, -nko/-nok, and -ikh/-ykh, as well as most borrowed foreign non-Slavic surnames, are unisex (uninflected by gender).

In emigration women may use the masculine form of the surname. The same happens in some English-language renderings, e.g., Raisa Gorbachev instead of Raisa Gorbacheva.

== Baltic languages ==
=== Lithuanian ===
In Lithuanian, female surnames are inflected differently according to whether the woman is married or not, as well as the spelling of the name:

Man's surname	Woman's unmarried surname	Woman's married surname
-a or -as	-aitė	-ienė
-is or -ys	-ytė	-ienė
-us (-ius)	-ūtė (-iūtė)	-ienė or -uvienė

Married women usually use the suffix -ienė, but the suffix -uvienė may be used if the male surname is disyllabic and ends with -us or -ius. In the second half of the 20th century, married women, especially artists, began to use their maiden names.

Since 2003, Lithuanian law has allowed married women to use -ė to make their marital status ambiguous (e.g., Kazlauskas to Kazlauskė instead of Kazlauskienė).

Before the inflection of Lithuanian surnames became standardized, regional variations occurred, such as -kė for unmarried women due to Polish influence.

=== Latvian ===
Latvian surnames are consistently inflected by gender in accordance with Latvian grammar (see Language policy in Latvia § Official use of languages). The nature of the suffixes used (mainly -a, often -e for names of foreign origin) is purely grammatical, i.e., it is enough to assume the typical feminine declension pattern (e.g., Ozoliņš to Ozoliņa). Surnames that already end in -a or -e in the masculine form do not change.

In addition to the typical inflection rules, foreign proper names (not only personal ones) are transcribed to better fit the phonetic reality of Latvian, including names from other languages that use the Latin alphabet (e.g., Bills Klintons and Hilarija Klintone). For the above reasons, Czech surnames ending in -ová and Russian surnames ending in -ina or -ova do not need to change.

== Other languages ==
=== Finnish ===
Between the 17th and 19th centuries, female surnames in East Finland contained a suffix that either attached to the end of a name or replaced another suffix, such as -nen, -inen or -lainen. For example, the feminine inflection of the name Karhunen is Karhutar.

The possibility of inflecting Finnish surnames in Finland ceased in 1929, when the law on marriage was passed. The wife's obligation to take her husband's name was abolished in 1985, when a new Act on surnames was adopted.

Today, Finnish surnames are common to both men and women, usually both using the masculine variant. Names with a female suffix can also be encountered (e.g. Kerätär) on both women and men. Since Finnish grammar does not distinguish between genders, the use of both variants is linguistically unproblematic.

=== Greek ===
In Greece, women's surnames are inflected to the genitive form of the male surname, as if the daughter/wife is "of" the man. For most male surnames, the female inflected suffix is -ou (e.g., Papadopoulos to Papadopoulou). If the male surname ends with -as, the female inflected surname will end with -a (e.g., Pappas to Pappa).

The practice of inflection decreased in 1983, when Greece passed legislation that required women to keep their maiden name. According to feminist Maria Karamessini, "it was an emancipation to keep our own names after marriage".

=== Icelandic ===
In Iceland, surnames in the narrower sense of a family name are relatively rare and used by only about 4% of the population. Instead, most people use a patronymic or matronymic (see Icelandic name). Sometimes, both a matronymic and a patronymic is used. A patronymic or matronymic surname is normally retained through adulthood, although there are legal options to change it. The declension of Icelandic matronymics and patronymics follows the normal rules for nouns. For example, Garðarsson becomes Garðarssyni in the dative and Garðarssonar in the genitive. By contrast, Icelandic family names, such as Scheving or Thoroddsen, usually do not inflect.

A child receives a last name created from the first name of one of the parents—traditionally the father, but in recent decades increasingly the mother—to which is appended one of three suffixes: -dóttir (feminine), -son (masculine), or -bur (neutral, an option available since 2019). Thus, the child of a man called Garðar can have one of the surnames Garðarsson (literally “Garðar's son”), Garðarsdóttir (“Garðar's daughter”) or Garðarsbur (“Garðar’s child”). However, the neutral option -bur is normally only used by persons who choose to change the official registration of their gender (which can be done without any restrictions or medical requirements from the age of 18, or even sooner with parental assent).

== Literature ==
- Miloslava Knappová: Přechylování příjmení v češtině, Naše řeč, Volume 62 (1979), Issue 5
- Miloslava Knappová: Začleňování cizích ženských příjmení do češtiny, Naše řeč, Volume 64 (1981), Issue 2
- Miloslava Knappová: Přechylování příjmení jako problém kodifikační a legislativní (návrh doplňkové kodifikační úpravy), Naše řeč, Volume 75 (1992), Issue 1
- Jan Petr: O začleňování litevských a lotyšských příjmení do češtiny (s návrhem na přepis litevských a lotyšských písmen), Naše řeč, Volume 65 (1982), Issue 2
