= Trophy Kids (2013 film) =

2013 American documentary

- Directed by: Christopher Bell
- Country of origin: United States
- Original language: English

Production
- Running time: 107 minutes

Original release
- Network: HBO
- Release: December 4, 2013

Trophy Kids is a 2013 film directed by Christopher Bell. It depicts a number of families where parents push their children excessively in sport. The film premiered on HBO on December 4, 2013.

== Synopsis ==
From the director of the film Bigger, Stronger, Faster* comes an intense look at the overbearing parents in sports. The film asks the question "Do we want what's best for our children? Or do we just want them to be the best?" Parts of this film were used in the premier of Peter Berg's HBO series State of Play.

== Cast ==
Name	Age	Hometown	Sport
Amari Avery	9	Riverside, California	Golf
Derek Biale	17	Redondo Beach, California	Basketball
Ian Fox	16	Redondo Beach, California	Basketball
Justus Moore	15	Duvall, Washington	American Football
Blake Suard	13	Hermosa Beach, California	Tennis
Tanner Suard	13	Hermosa Beach, California	Tennis

== Reception ==
The documentary received positive reviews as it shined a light on the struggles and stresses that these children face.
