= U. S. Kids Golf =

American youth golf organization

U.S. Kids Golf is a United States–based youth golf organization. Founded in 1996, U.S. Kids Golf has both an LLC component and a Foundation side. The for-profit business side is headquartered in Peachtree Corners, Georgia while the Foundation headquarters is located in Pinehurst, North Carolina.

== History ==
U.S. Kids Golf was founded in 1997 by Dan Van Horn. Van Horn, a former golf professional and engineering major, was inspired to create a line of lighter golf clubs after taking his son to a local golf course and realizing he was having trouble getting the ball up in the air while using a cut down adult golf club.

In 2000, U.S. Kids Golf held its first World Championship for Kids in Jekyll Island, Georgia.

In 2001, U.S. Kids Golf established the U.S. Kids Golf Foundation, a non-profit division.

In 2002, Local Tours for kids were started, with the first being staged in Atlanta, Georgia. Also that year, the World Championship was moved to Williamsburg, Virginia.

In 2004, U.S. Kids Golf established its first Top 50 Kids Coaches award.

In 2005, the first U.S. Kids Golf Teen World Championship was held in Naples, Florida, and the World Championship was moved to Pinehurst, North Carolina. In 2008, both events were staged in Pinehurst where they remain.

In 2012, the U.S. Kids Golf Coaches Institute was founded to train coaches.

In 2015, the U.S. Kids Golf Foundation purchased Longleaf Golf & Country Club in Southern Pines, North Carolina. The name was changed to Longleaf Golf & Family Club with the intent of being a “Living Lab” for "best practices" in how to serve members. As part of this goal, U.S. Kids Golf established the first U.S. Kids Golf Academy on the site. The academy had over 400 kids after three years.

In 2018, the National Golf Foundation cited U.S. Kids Golf as one of the Top 100 Businesses in Golf. The biannual award was also given to U.S. Kids Golf in 2020.
